= Trefusis family =

Cornish family

Canting arms of Trefusis: Argent, a chevron between three fusils (i.e. spindles) sable

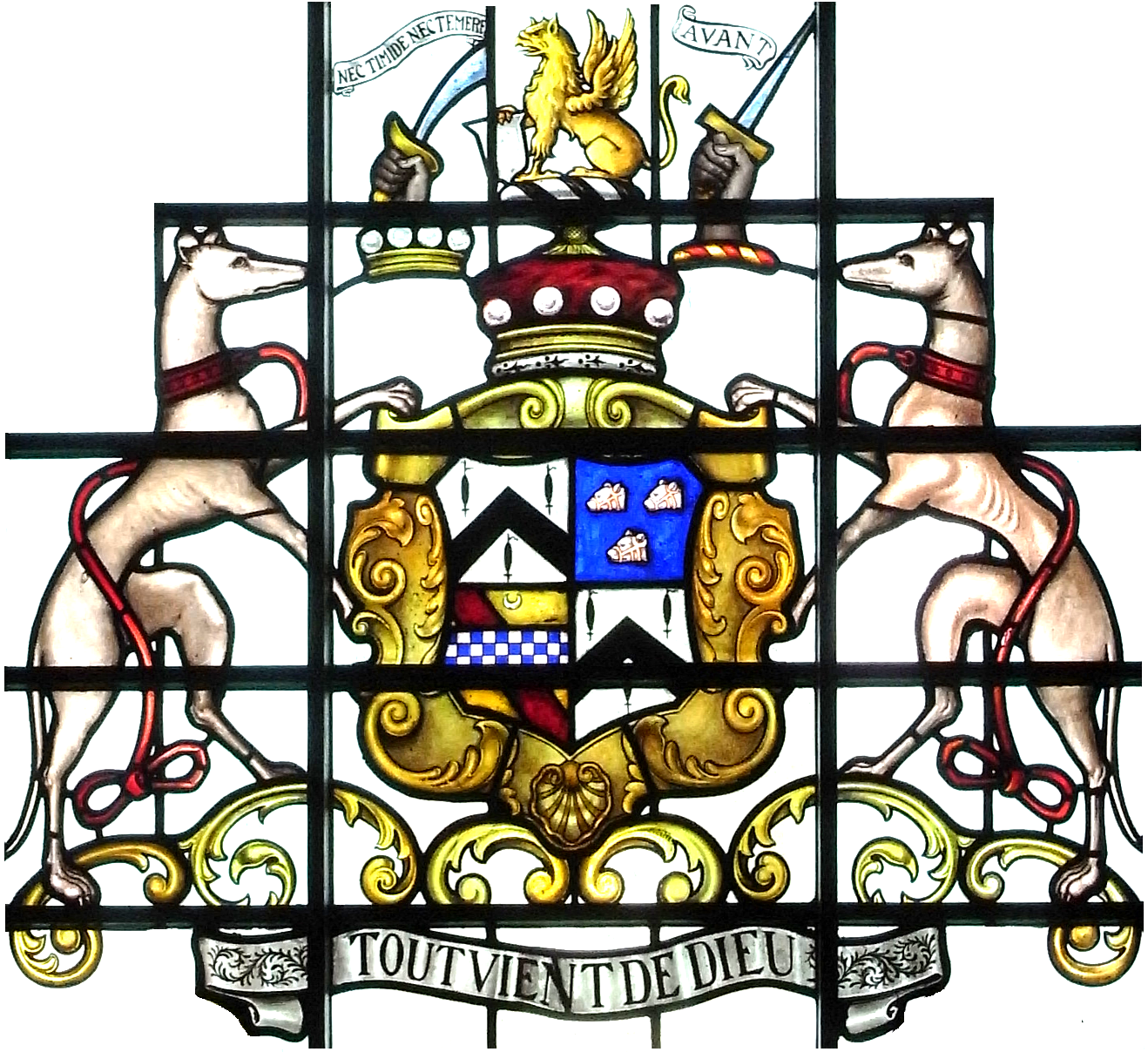
Trefusis heraldic achievement, detail from stained glass windows in Bicton House, Devon, seat of John Rolle, 1st Baron Rolle (died 1842), husband of Louisa Trefusis, youngest daughter of Robert Trefusis, 17th Baron Clinton. Blazon: Quarterly of 4: 1&4: Argent, a chevron between three spindles sable (Trefusis); 2: Azure, three bear's heads couped argent muzzled gules a cross crosslet argent for difference (Forbes of Pitsligo); 3: Or, a bend gules surmounted by a fess chequy azure and argent in chief a crescent azure a canton ermine for difference (Stuart)

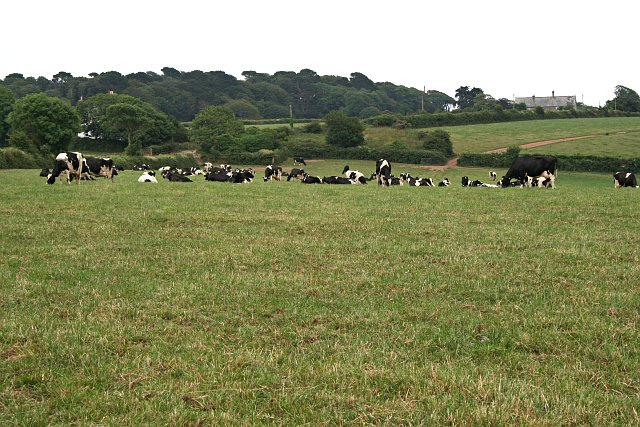
The manor house of Trefusis, now a farmhouse, with grazing Friesian cows

The Trefusis (/trəˈfjuːsɪs/) trə-FEW-sis family of Cornwall (anciently de Trefusis) continue in 2018 as lords of the manor of Trefusis, near Flushing in the parish of Mylor, Cornwall, from which they took their surname at some time before the 13th century.

In 1794 Robert George William Trefusis (1764–1797) of Trefusis, the senior representative of the family, successfully claimed the peerage title Baron Clinton following the death in 1791 without progeny of his grandfather's 3rd cousin George Walpole, 3rd Earl of Orford, 16th Baron Clinton (1730–1791), and thus became the 17th Baron Clinton. Both Walpole and Trefusis were descended from the marriage of Robert Rolle (c. 1622 – 1660) of Heanton Satchville, Petrockstowe, Devon, and Lady Arabella Clinton, the younger daughter of Theophilus Clinton, 4th Earl of Lincoln, 12th Baron Clinton (died 1667).

The senior line of the Trefusis family died out in the male line in 1957 on the death of Charles John Robert Hepburn-Stuart-Forbes-Trefusis, 21st Baron Clinton (1863–1957), who left two daughters and co-heiresses to the barony, which went into abeyance, but being an ancient one created by writ, is able to descend via female lines.

The abeyancy was terminated in 1965 when the title Baron Clinton was claimed by Gerard Nevile Mark Fane-Trefusis (1934–2024), a descendant in a junior line of Thomas Fane, 8th Earl of Westmorland (1701–1771), and the grandson of the 21st Baron's eldest daughter, who in 1958 had assumed by deed poll the additional surname of Trefusis, and thus became the 22nd Baron Clinton.

As he inherited the vast Devonshire estates (mostly formerly belonging to the Rolle family) of the 21st Baron, who "held sway over the largest estate Devon had ever seen", (now managed by his Clinton Devon Estates company), the Cornwall estates including Trefusis descended to Major Hon. Henry Walter Hepburn-Stuart-Forbes-Trefusis of the Scots Guards, the second son of Charles Henry Rolle Hepburn-Stuart-Forbes-Trefusis, 20th Baron Clinton (1834–1904), and in 2015 the occupant of the manor house of Trefusis is the Major's grandson Nicholas John Trefusis (born 1943), Lieutenant-Commander Royal Navy, a Justice of the Peace for Cornwall and a Deputy Lieutenant for that county.

== Armorials ==
The arms of the Trefusis family are: Argent, a chevron between three spindles sable; the crest is: A griffin segreant or resting his dexter foot on a shield argent.

== Notable family members ==
- Arthur Trefusis Heneage Williams, Canadian businessman and politician
- Charles Trefusis, 19th Baron Clinton (1791–1866), a British peer and Tory politician.
- Elizabeth Trefusis (1762–1808), a poet of the Romantic period
- Francis Trefusis, one of the MPs for Penryn in 1679 and has a monument in Mylor church, dated 1680.
  - Samuel Trefusis, son of Francis, and MP for Penryn from 1698–1713 and 15 March 1714–1722.
- Jane Trefusis Forbes, Scottish businesswoman and the first director of the Women's Auxiliary Air Force (1939–43)
- John Trefusis of Trefusis was High Sheriff of Cornwall in 1626.
- Brigadier-General John Frederick Hepburn-Stuart-Forbes-Trefusis (1878–1915), DSO, British Army officer in World War I
- Mark George Kerr Trefusis (1835–1907), later Mark George Kerr Trefusis Rolle – the largest Devonshire landholder in the Return of Owners of Land, 1873, High Sheriff of Devonshire
- Lady Mary Trefusis, née Lygon (1869–1927), hymn writer, the Court link in the establishment of the English Folk Dance Society, of which she was first Secretary; Lady in Waiting to Queen Mary
- Nicholas Trefusis (died c. 1648), English politician who sat in the House of Commons of England
- Robert Trefusis (1843–1930), inaugural Suffragan Bishop of Crediton from 1897 to 1930
- Violet Trefusis, née Keppel (1894–1972), English writer and socialite

Fictional

- Miss Emily Trefusis, amateur detective in The Sittaford Mystery by Agatha Christie
- Professor Donald Trefusis (1921–2008), professor at the University of Cambridge, created by Stephen Fry
- Dr. Trefusis, tutor in volumes 1 and 2 of the "Octavian Nothing" novel series by M. T. Anderson
- Mrs Trefusis, an alias of Cessair of Diplos, from the Doctor Who story The Stones of Blood
