= Heanton Satchville, Huish =

Historic estate in Devon, England

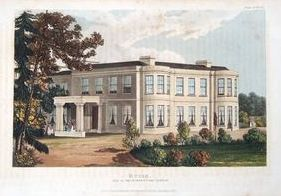
Heanton Satchville, Huish in 1828

Heanton Satchville is an estate in the parish of Huish in Devon. It took its name from the nearby former ancient estate of Heanton Satchville, Petrockstowe. It is the seat of Baron Clinton who owns the largest private estate in Devon, known as Clinton Devon Estates.

== History ==
In 1797, shortly before the early death of Robert Trefusis, 17th Baron Clinton (1764–1797) at the age of 33, his ancient and grand mansion house at Heanton Satchville in the parish of Petrockstowe in Devon, burned down. His wife died a year after him, leaving a 10-year-old son and heir Robert Trefusis, 18th Baron Clinton (1787–1832), without a habitable residence. In 1812, on reaching his majority of 21, he purchased the manor of Huish, including the recently built mansion house known as Innes House, situated to the east across the valley from the destroyed Heanton Satchville. He abandoned the burnt-down house, which was razed to the ground without trace, renamed Innes House as "Heanton Satchville", and made it his new residence. On 18 December 1932 the mansion at Huish also burned down, but was rebuilt in 1937-8 by Charles John Robert Hepburn-Stuart-Forbes-Trefusis, 21st Baron Clinton (1863–1957) to the design of Sir Walter Tapper and Michael Tapper, in the late 17th-century style, in an H-shape, with modillion cornice and sash-windows. Bicton House, inherited from his paternal uncle Mark Rolle (d.1907) had nevertheless remained the 21st Baron's principal seat until his death in 1957. The 21st Baron Clinton died without male issue, and the title, having briefly fallen into abeyance, was eventually inherited in 1965 by Gerard Fane, the grandson of his eldest daughter Harriet Trefusis, who also inherited the vast Clinton estates and changed his surname to "Fane-Trefusis". Today Heanton Satchville remains the principal residence of the Fane-Trefusis family, Barons Clinton.
