= Manor of Bicton =

Historic manor in east Devon, England

The Manor of Bicton is an historic manor in the parish of Bicton in east Devon, England.

== Descent of the manor ==
=== Porter ===
In the Exchequer version of the Domesday Book of 1086, the manor of Bechetone was listed as the 1st of the 16 holdings under the heading Terrae Servientium Regis ("Lands of the King's servants"). It was held in-chief from the king (by service unknown) by Wills Porto, that is "William the Porter", meaning "gatekeeper" (from the Latin porta a gate). In the Exon version of Domesday Book however this manor is listed with the same tenant, but under the heading Terra Nicolai Balistarii ("Land of Nicholas the Bowman"), thus William held not as a tenant-in-chief but as a mesne tenant from Nicholas. Nicholas also held the manors of Webbery, Greenslinch, Stoketeignhead, Rocombe, Ogwell, Holbeam, Bagtor, Ideford, Staplehill, Buckland-in-the-Moor, Aller and possibly Northleigh. It appears that the Exchequer version of Domesday Book corrected the Exon positioning to show William the Porter as a servant and tenant-in-chief of the king.

=== Janitor ===
In the reign of King Henry I (1100–1135) the manor of Bicton was granted by the king to John Janitor, who held the manor by the feudal tenure of grand serjeanty requiring him to provide a county jail, which was an honourable position of trust. The Latin noun Janitor means "door-keeper", generally understood in the sense janitor carceris, "door-keeper of a jail". Thus the tenant took his surname from his form of tenure. The prison was later transferred to a building beneath Exeter Castle in the county capital Exeter, (see Exeter Prison), but the feudal tenant of Bicton was nevertheless for many centuries required to meet part of the repair and maintenance costs of the newly sited jail (see Rolle, below). John Janitor was followed by his son Roger and then Roger's sons William and John.

=== Alabaster ===
Arms of Alabaster of Bicton: Azure, three cross-bows bent or

During the reign of King Edward I (1272–1307) the manor of Bicton passed to Galfride la Balister, (alias Alabaster, Arblaster and the Latinised form Balistarius, meaning "the Bowman", as in the case of the Domesday Book tenant Nicholas the Bowman) the husband of the daughter of the last in the male line of the Janitor family of Bicton. The canting arms of the family of Alabaster of Bicton were: Azure, three cross-bows bent or. He held by the same tenure and held elsewhere by the grand-sergeanty, as suggested by his name, to "attend the king with his cross-bow and arrows in hunting". Raph la Balister was the tenant in 1229 and was followed by Galfride, Reginald, Galfride, Richard (died 1318) whose son was Walter. Walter la Balister left three children:

- Raph Alabaster (died 1351), died without children
- Alis Alabaster, died without children
- Agnes Alabaster, who married husband unknown and left a daughter and heiress named Joan, who married Raph Sachevill (died 1395)

=== Sachvill ===
Raph Sachevill (died 1395) married Joan, the heiress of Bicton. His son and heir was John Sachvill, whose grandson was the last in the male line and left daughters as his co-heiresses. One of the daughters, Johanna Sachville, married John Copleston (died 1497).

=== Coppleston ===
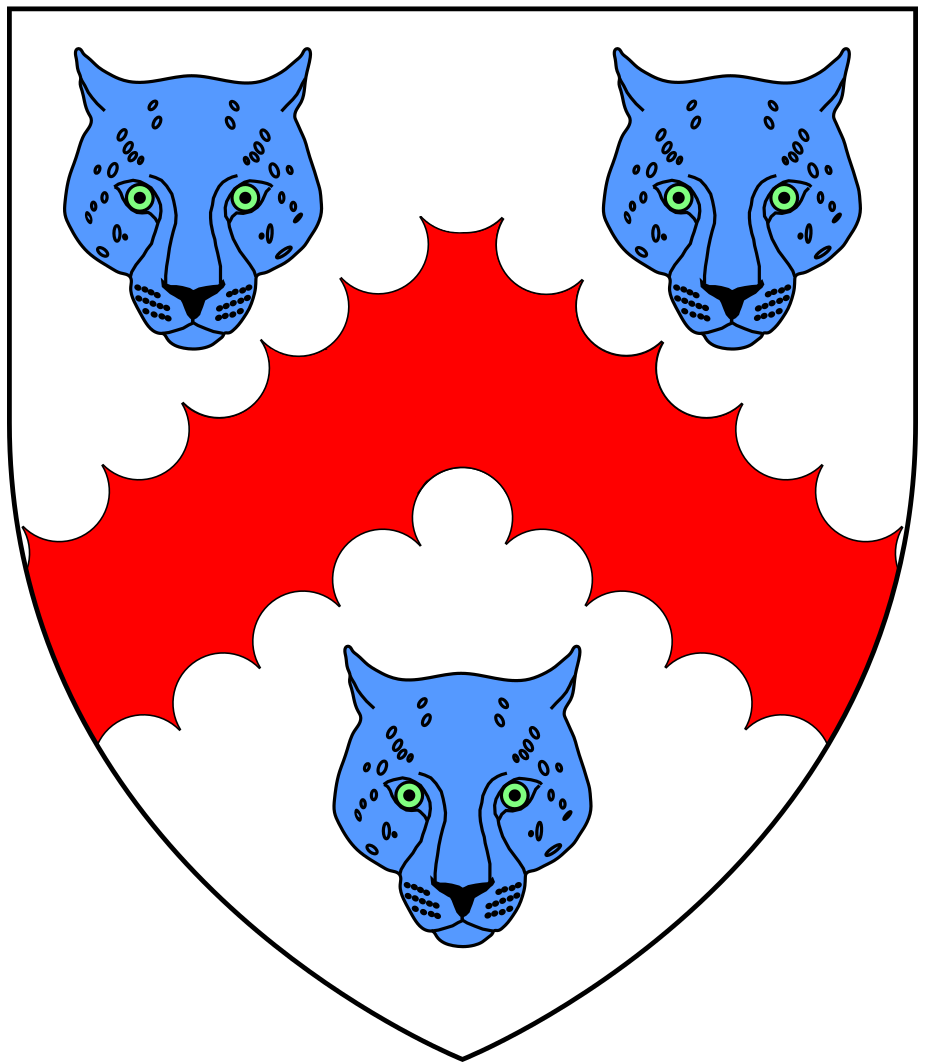
Arms of Copleston: Argent, a chevron engrailed gules between three leopard's faces azure

The Coplestone family took its name from the Devon Manor of Copleston. Henry Copleston (born 1473), son and heir of John Copleston (died 1497) inherited Bicton from his mother Johanna Sachville.

Henry's son was Charles Copleston, who married Anne Reigny, the daughter and sole-heiress of Richard Reigny of Eggesford. The family later made their seat at Eggesford and the manor of Bicton was sold to the Denys family.

=== Denys ===
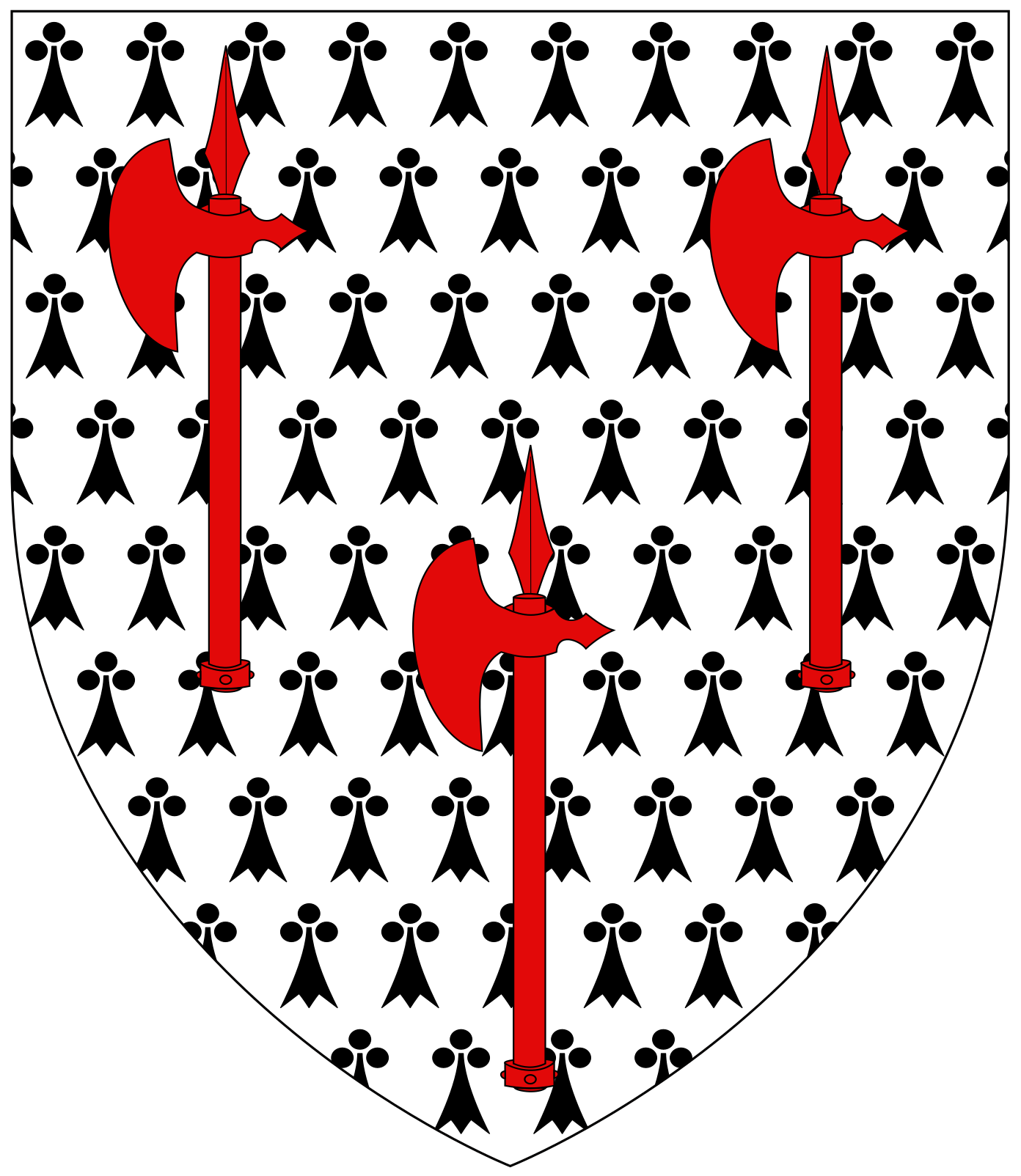
Arms of Denys

Sir Robert Denys (1525–1592), MP, built a mansion house near the site of the present Orangery, now within the Bicton Botanical Gardens. He was the son of Sir Thomas Denys (died 1561), Sheriff Of Devon, Privy Councillor and Chancellor to Anne of Cleves. He received a royal licence to empark, and stocked his new park with deer. He added formal gardens with slopes, terraces and parallelogram ponds. His son Sir Thomas Denys (1559–1613) married Anne Paulet, daughter of William Paulet, 3rd Marquis of Winchester and had two daughters, co-heiresses. The eldest was Anne Denys, who by her marriage to Sir Henry Rolle (died 1616) of Stevenstone, brought Bicton to the Rolle family. The younger daughter Margaret Denys (died 1649) married Sir Arthur Mainwaring of Ightfield, Shropshire, carver to Prince Henry, eldest son of King James I.

=== Rolle ===
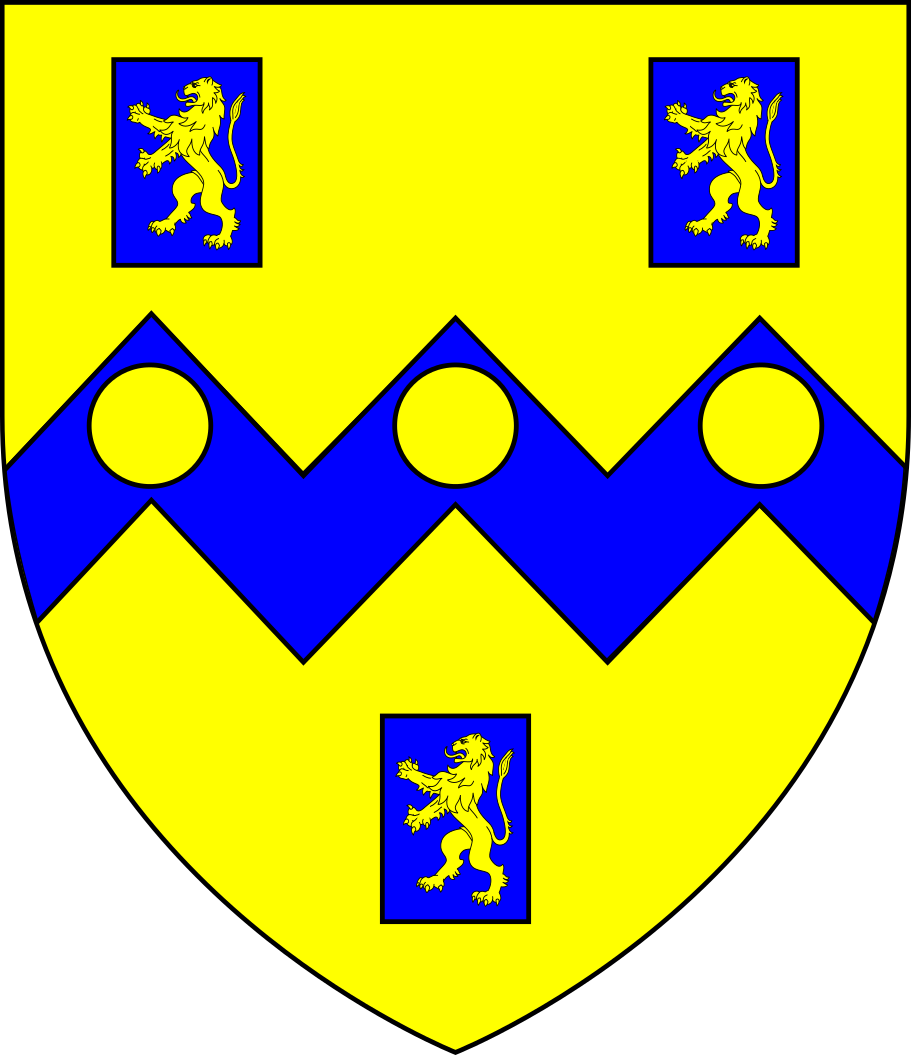
Arms of Rolle

Dennis Rolle (1614–1638) was the son and heir of Sir Henry Rolle and Anne Denys. He died aged only 24, and was buried in Bicton Old Church (now the Rolle Mausoleum) where survives his elaborate monument and effigy. His infant son died soon after him, thus he left only daughters who were excluded from the inheritance by entail. The manor of Bicton then passed to his nearest heir male Henry Rolle (1605–47) of Beam, Great Torrington, who died without issue in 1647 when the Rolle estates passed to his closest male cousin, 21-year-old Sir John Rolle (1626–1706) of Marhayes in the parish of Week St. Mary in Cornwall, who had married his cousin Florence Rolle (1630-1705), eldest daughter of Denys Rolle (1614–1638) of Bicton. The mural monument of the latter survives in Tawstock Church, North Devon, showing a double impalement of Rolle, for husband and wife.

The Devon topographer John Swete (died 1821) stated that Dennis Rolle (died 1797) (great-grandson of Sir John Rolle of Marhayes), the proprietor of Bicton at the time of his visit, had paid the sum of £1,000 to the Treasury to be released in perpetuity from his vestigial feudal liabilities for maintaining a county gaol (see Janitor, above). The release was effected by an Act of Parliament in 1787.

The estates stayed in the Rolle family until the death of the latter's son John Rolle, 1st Baron Rolle (1750–1842) who died at Bicton House aged 86. His elaborate monument, designed by Pugin, is also in the Rolle Mausoleum.

=== Trefusis, Barons Clinton ===
Arms of Trefusis

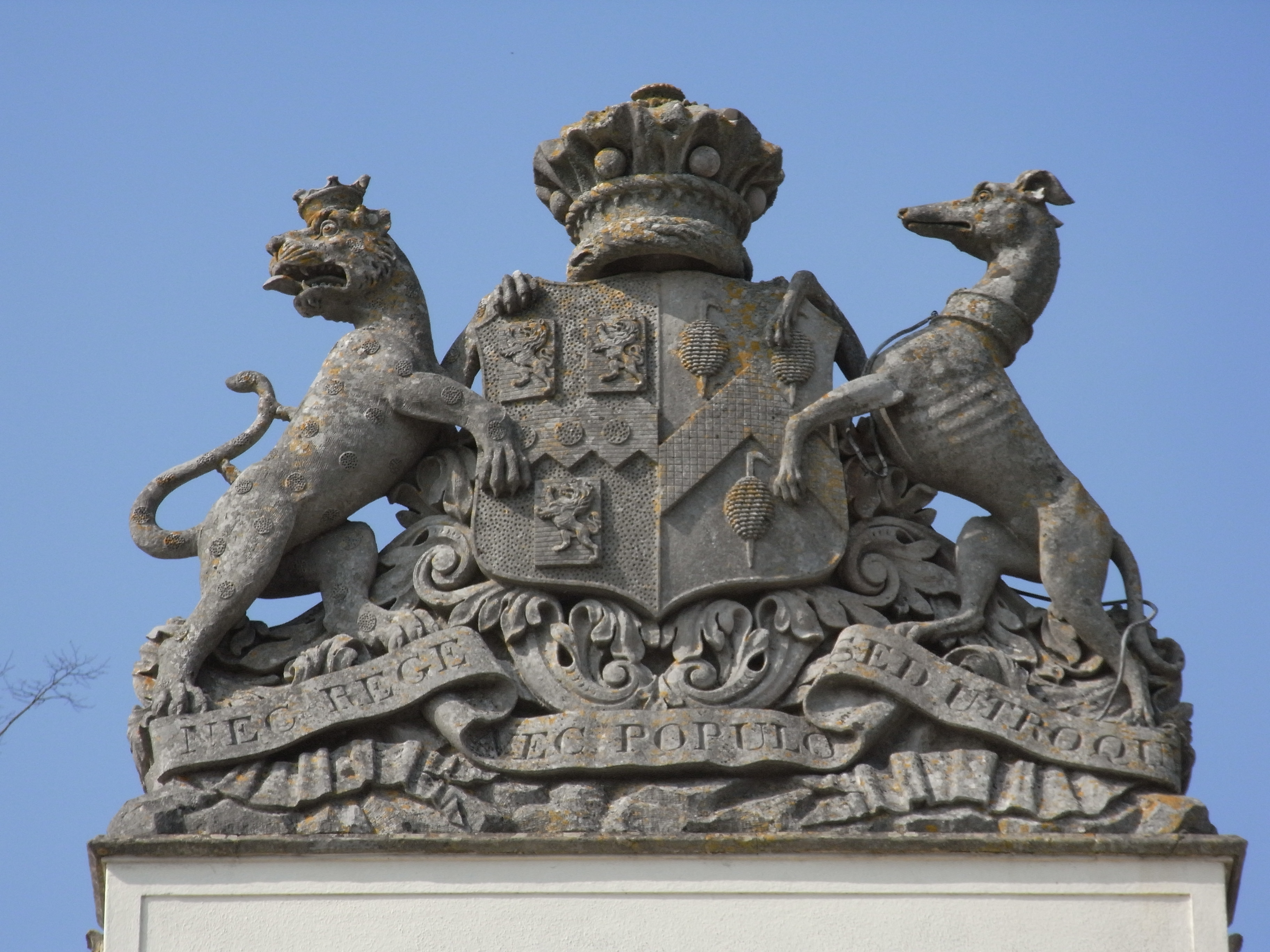
Heraldic achievement of Baron Rolle (died 1842) on top of main gates to Bicton House.

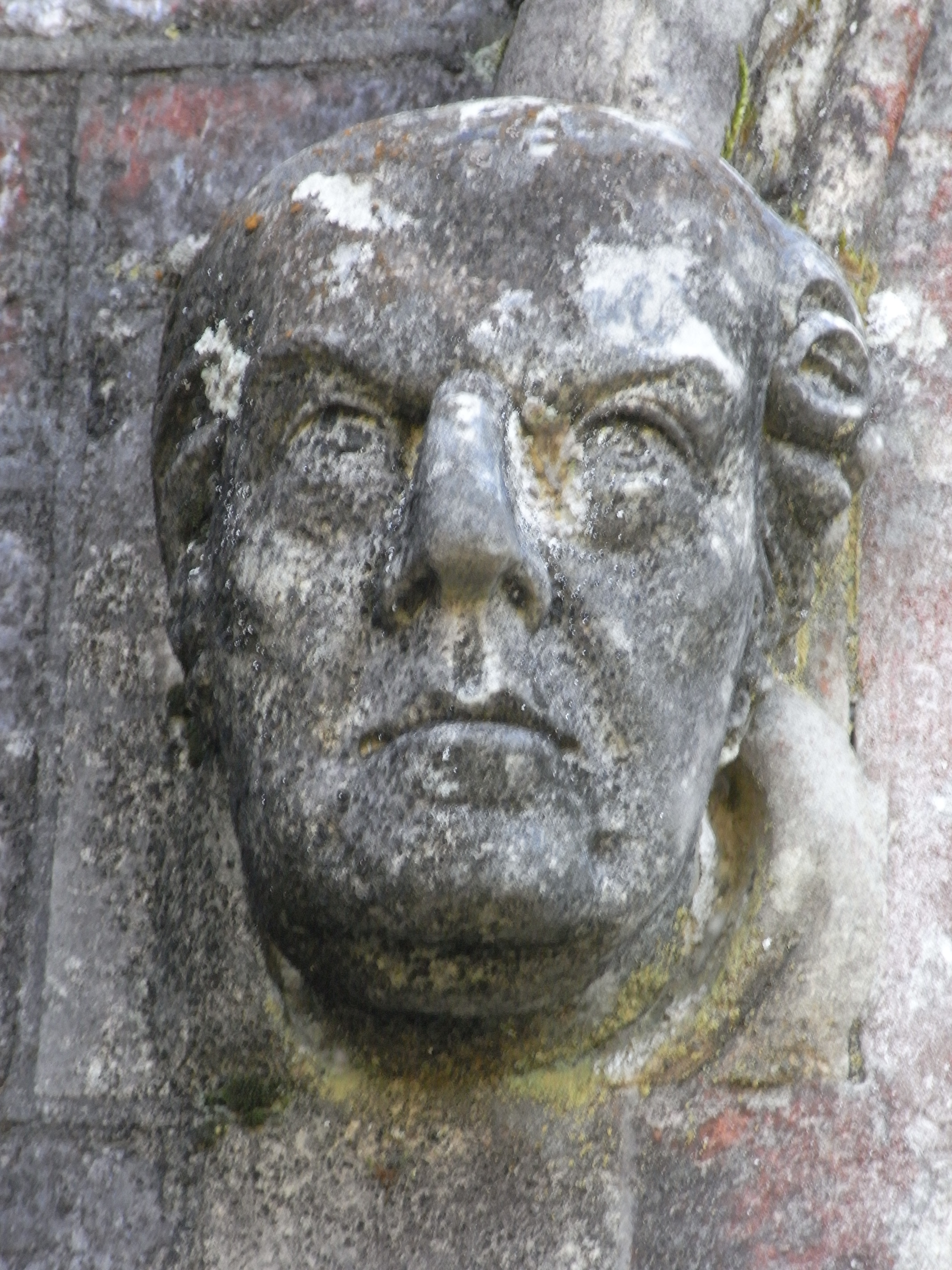
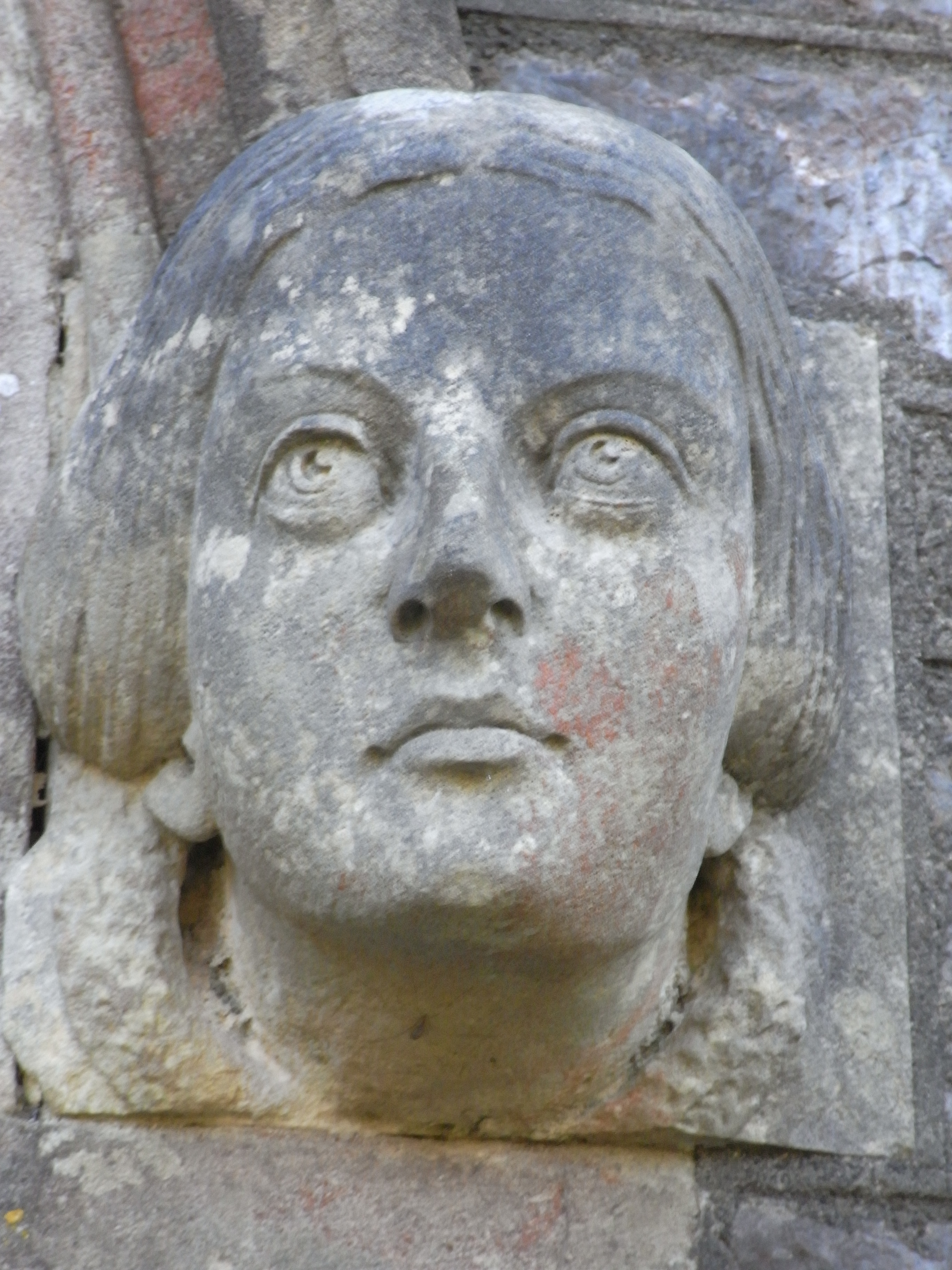
Dripstone sculpted heads depicting Baron Rolle (left) and his second wife Louisa Trefusis (right) either side of external porch of (north) private entrance to Rolle pews, in the church at Bicton erected by Louisa in 1850.

In 1822 at the age of 66 the childless Baron Rolle married, as his second wife, his very distant cousin the 28-year-old Louisa Trefusis (died 1885). Whilst Lord Rolle was descended from George II Rolle (died 1573), the second son of George I Rolle (c.1486-1552) of Stevenstone, the founder of the family, Louisa was descended from George I's fourth son Henry Rolle, who had married Margaret Yeo, the heiress of Heanton Satchville, Petrockstowe. Henry Rolle's great-grandson Robert Rolle (died 1660), MP, of Heanton Satchville, had married Lady Arabella Clinton, one of the two co-heiresses of her nephew Edward Clinton, 13th Baron Clinton and 5th Earl of Lincoln. Their eldest son and heir was Samuel Rolle (1646-1717) of Heanton Satchville, whose daughter and heiress Margaret Rolle, Baroness Clinton, married Robert Walpole, 2nd Earl of Orford. On the extinction of the senior line of the Rolle-Clinton union on the death of George Walpole, 3rd Earl of Orford, 16th Baron Clinton (died 1791) (son of Margaret Rolle, Baroness Clinton), the heir to Heanton Satchville became the descendants of Bridget Rolle (1648–1721) (sister of Samuel Rolle of Heanton Satchville) who had married in 1672 Francis Trefusis of the manor of Trefusis in Cornwall. Louisa Trefusis, the second wife of Baron Rolle, was fifth in descent from Francis Trefusis and Bridget Rolle, being the daughter of Robert George William Trefusis (1764–1797), 17th Baron Clinton, of Trefusis, Cornwall. A marble bust of Louisa survives in the Orangery at Bicton.

Louisa and Lord Rolle shared a love of gardening and created the grand landscaped garden at Bicton, now open to the public as Bicton Park Botanical Gardens. An American traveller Elihu Burritt visited Bicton in 1864 and described her hostess with great praise:

"This lady is a remarkable woman, without equal or like in England...she is a female rival of Alexander the Great. The world that the Grecian conqueror subjugated was a small affair in space compared with the two hemispheres which this English lady has taken by the hair of the head and bound to her chair of state. It seems to have been her ambition for nearly half a century to do what was never done before by man or woman in filling her great park and gardens with a collection of trees and shrubs that should be to them what the British Museum is to the relics of antiquity and the literature of all ages".

==== Adopted heir ====
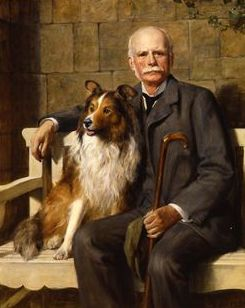
Hon. Mark Rolle (1836–1907), by Sir John Collier (died 1934). Collection of Lord Clinton

Rolle's second marriage also produced no children, and at his death in 1842 Rolle decided to appoint as his heir Louisa's younger nephew, the six-year-old Hon. Mark George Kerr Trefusis (1836–1907), the younger brother of Charles Trefusis (1834–1904) 20th Baron Clinton. Whether his marriage to Louise had been by chance or design, in fact the Trefusis Barons Clinton would have had an excellent claim to be his closest kin and legal heirs. Thus Rolle had followed his family's ancient practice of keeping the estates "in the family". His will required his young heir to change his name to Rolle, which he duly performed, and to adopt the Rolle arms in lieu of those of Trefusis. However, his design to revive the Rolle family was ultimately unsuccessful as Mark Rolle produced only two daughters and no son, and the Rolle inheritance passed to his male heir, his nephew, Charles John Robert Trefusis (1863–1957), 21st Baron Clinton.

== Current ownership ==
The mansion house was sold by Lord Clinton to Devon County Council and is now Bicton College of Agriculture. The Botanical Gardens were restored by Lord Clinton to their pre-war splendour and opened to the public in 1963. In 1986 he gave them to a charitable trust which sold the gardens to Simon and Valerie Lister, a Devon couple from a farming background who have turned it into a commercial visitor attraction named Bicton Park Botanical Gardens, claimed to be "Devon's most magnificent historic gardens". However, as for the rest of the land comprising the former manor of Bicton, this remains in the ownership of Clinton Devon Estates, owned by Baron Clinton. Part is operated as an equestrian venue known as Bicton Arena (50.6664°N 3.3171°W).

== Sources ==
- Swete, Rev. John, Illustrated Journals of, published as Travels in Georgian Devon, The Illustrated Journals of the Reverend John Swete, 1789–1800, Gray, Todd & Rowe, Margery (Eds.), Vol.2, pp. 140–145, Tiverton, Devon, 1998
