= Elizabeth Trefusis =

Cornish poet (1762–1808)

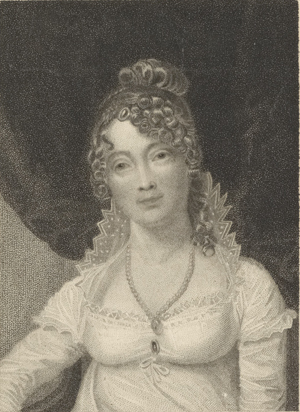
- Born: 16 January 1762
- Died: 8 August 1808 (aged 46)
- Parent(s): Robert Cotton Trefusis; Anne St. John
- Family: Robert Trefusis, 17th Baron Clinton

Elizabeth "Ella" Trefusis (16 January 1762 – 8 August 1808) was a Cornish poet of the Romantic period.

Elizabeth Trefusis was born on 16 January 1762, the second daughter of Robert Cotton Trefusis, from the Cornwall Trefusis family, and Anne St. John, daughter of John St John, 12th Baron St John of Bletso. Her brother was Robert Trefusis, 17th Baron Clinton.

Early in life, she wrote two novels, Claribell and Eudora, as well as a pastoral romance, The Cousins. None of these works were published and the manuscripts are lost, but they included various pieces published posthumously in Poems and tales, by Miss Trefusis in 1808. The poems are largely romantic and many the champion women wronged by men. The collection was well-reviewed.

Elizabeth Trefusis died on 8 August 1808.

William Beloe wrote extensively about Trefusis in his controversial memoir The Sexagenarian (1817), but his accuracy has been questioned.

Her work was anthologized in Specimens of British Poetesses (1825).

== Bibliography ==
- Poems and tales, by Miss Trefusis. (2 vol.) London, printed for Samuel Tipper, Leadenhall street, by T. Bensley, Bolt Court, 1808.
