= Alexander Dyce =

Scottish writer and scholar (1798–1869)

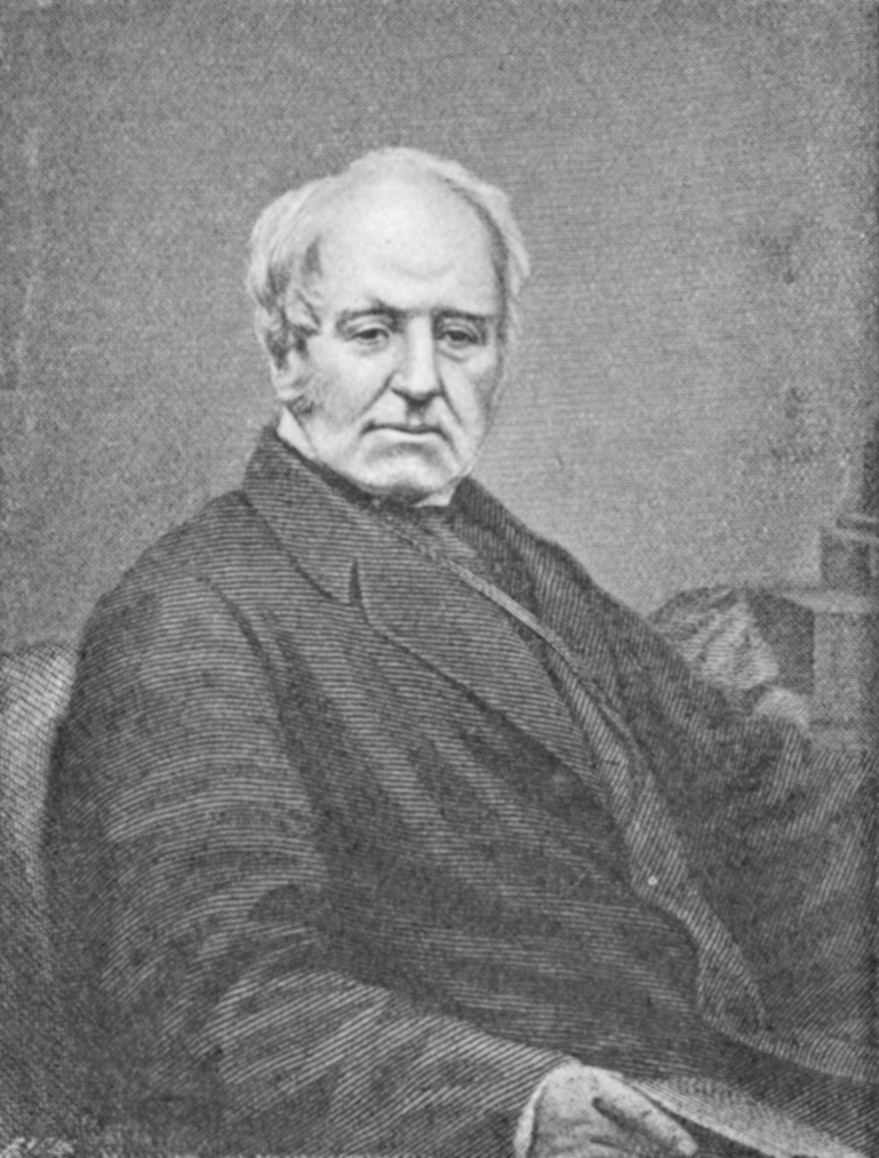
- Portrait of Alexander Dyce, 1895
- Born: 30 June 1798; Edinburgh, Scotland
- Died: 15 May 1869 (aged 70); London, England
- Occupations: Writer; scholar

Alexander Dyce (30 June 1798 – 15 May 1869) was a Scottish writer and scholar. He was very well known for his books on Shakespeare.

== Life ==
He was born in Edinburgh and received his early education at the high school there, before becoming a student at Exeter College, Oxford, where he graduated B.A. in 1819. He took holy orders, and became a curate at Lantegloss, in Cornwall, and subsequently at Nayland, in Suffolk; in 1827 he settled in London.

His first books were Select Translations from Quintus Smyrnaeus (1821), an edition of Collins (1827), and Specimens of British Poetesses (1825). He issued annotated editions of George Peele, Robert Greene, John Webster, Thomas Middleton, Marlowe, and Beaumont and Fletcher, with lives of the authors and much illustrative matter. He completed, in 1833, an edition of James Shirley left unfinished by William Gifford, and contributed biographies of Shakespeare, Pope, Akenside and Beattie to Pickering's Aldine Poets. He also edited (1836–1838) Richard Bentley's works, and Specimens of British Sonnets (1833). His carefully prepared and exhaustive edition of John Skelton, which appeared in 1843, for the first time presented the full oeuvre (so far as it survives) of this unjustly overlooked and often maligned poet of the early Tudor period. It is still indispensable for a serious study of the poet. In 1857 his edition of Shakespeare was published by Moxon; and the second edition was issued by Chapman & Hall in 1866. He also published Remarks on Collier's and Knight's Editions of Shakespeare (1844); A Few Notes on Shakespeare (1853); and Strictures on Collier's new Edition of Shakespeare (1859), which ended the long friendship between Dyce and the literary scholar (and forger) John Payne Collier.

Dyce was closely connected with several literary societies, and undertook the publication of Kempe's Nine Days' Wonder for the Camden Society; and the old plays of Timon of Athens and Sir Thomas More were published by him for the Shakespeare Society. He was associated with Halliwell-Phillips, John Payne Collier and Thomas Wright as one of the founders of the Percy Society, for publishing old English poetry. Dyce also issued Recollections of the Table Talk of Samuel Rogers (1856).

By the time of his death, Dyce had collected a valuable library, containing many rare Elizabethan books, and this collection was left to the South Kensington Museum (Victoria and Albert Museum). Dyce's bequest comprised 80 pictures, 63 miniatures, 802 drawings, 1,511 prints, 74 rings, 27 art objects, and 13,596 books. His wide reading in Elizabethan literature enabled him to explain much that was formerly obscure in Shakespeare. While preserving all that was valuable in former editions, Dyce added much fresh matter. His Glossary, a large volume of 500 pages, was the most exhaustive that had appeared.

This entry is updated from the 1911 Encyclopædia Britannica.

== Bibliography ==
- Dyce, Alexander (1856). Recollections of the table-talk of Samuel Rogers: To which is added Porsoniana. London: E. Moxon. OCLC 37328415. (1856 edition published in New York)
