= Williams-Drummond baronets =

Extinct baronetcy in the Baronetage of the United Kingdom

The Drummond, later Williams-Drummond Baronetcy, of Hawthornden in the County of Mid Lothian, was a title in the Baronetage of the United Kingdom. It was created on 27 February 1828 for John Forbes Drummond. In accordance with the special reminder, the baronetcy passed to his son-in-law Francis Walker, who had assumed the additional name of Drummond upon his marriage in 1810. The third Baronet assumed the surname of Williams in lieu of that of Walker in 1858 under the terms of the will of his father-in-law, Sir James Hamlyn-Williams, 3rd Baronet 'of Clovelly'. The fourth Baronet served as Lord Lieutenant of Carmarthenshire. The title became extinct on the death of the sixth Baronet in 1976.

== Drummond, later Williams-Drummond baronets, of Hawthornden (1828) ==
- Sir John Forbes Drummond, 1st Baronet (died 1829)
- Sir Francis Walker Drummond, 2nd Baronet WS FRSE (1781–1844)
- Sir James Williams-Drummond, 3rd Baronet (1814–1866)
- Sir James Hamlyn Williams Williams-Drummond, 4th Baronet (1857–1913)
- Sir James Hamlyn Williams Williams-Drummond, 5th Baronet (1891–1970)
- Sir William Hugh Dudley Williams-Drummond, 6th Baronet (1901–1976)

== Arms ==
Coat of arms of Drummond of Hawthornden
Crest A demi-pegasus Argent maned and winged Or. Escutcheon Quarterly, 1st and 4th: Or, three bars wavy within a bordure Gules (Drummond); 2nd and 3rd: Azure, three bears’ heads couped close argent muzzled Gules (Forbes). Supporters Two naked savages, each wreathed about the head and loins with laurels and over the exterior shoulder of each a club, all Proper. Motto Hos gloria reddit honores (These honours are acquired by glory)

Coat of arms of Williams-Drummond of Hawthornden
Crest A demi-pegasus Argent maned and winged Or. Escutcheon Grand-quarterly, 1st and 4th: quarterly, i and iv: Or, three bars wavy within a bordure Gules (Drummond); ii and iii: Azure, three bears’ heads couped close argent muzzled Gules (Forbes); 2nd and 3rd: Argent, a lion rampant Sable, head, paws, and tuft of tail of the Field (Williams). Supporters Two naked savages, each wreathed about the head and loins with laurels and over the exterior shoulder of each a club, all Proper. Motto Hos gloria reddit honores (These honours are acquired by glory)

== See also ==
- Drummond baronets
- Hamlyn-Williams baronets
- Williams baronets

Baronetage of the United Kingdom
Preceded by Chamberlain baronets	Drummond baronets of Hawthornden; 27 February 1828	Succeeded by Freeling baronets
