= John Cunningham Saunders =

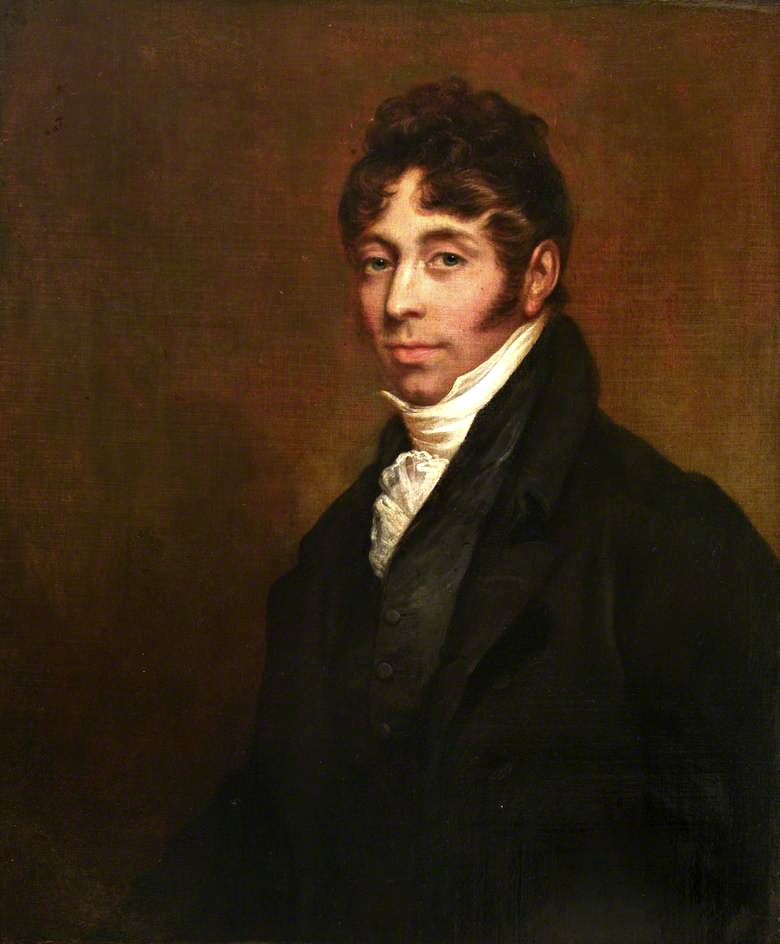
- Portrait of John Cunningham Saunders by Arthur William Devis
- Born: 1773
- Died: 1810 (aged 36–37)
- Occupation: eye surgeon
- Father: John Cunningham Saunders (1737–1783)

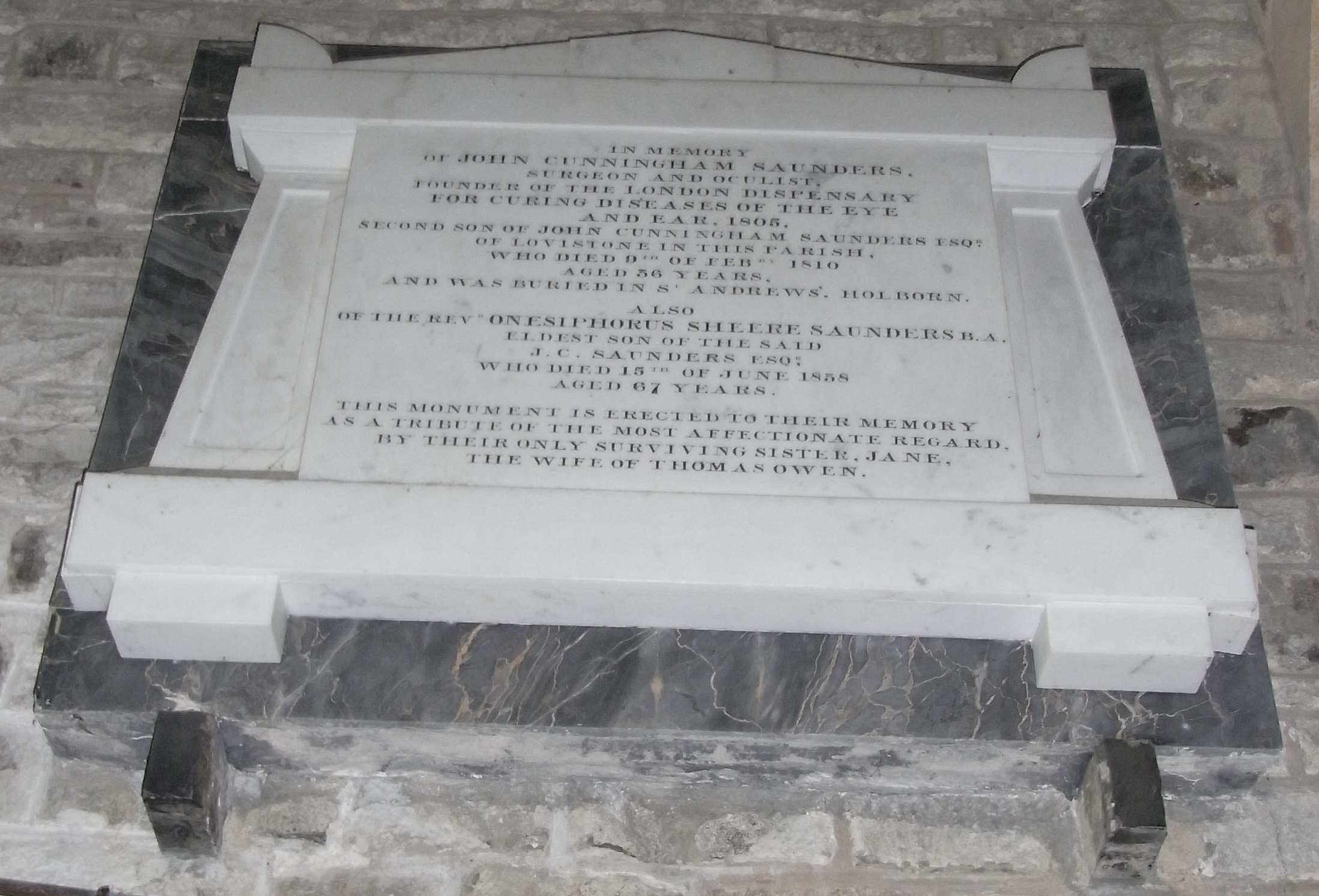
Mural monument to John Cunningham Saunders, Church of St James the Less, Huish, Devon

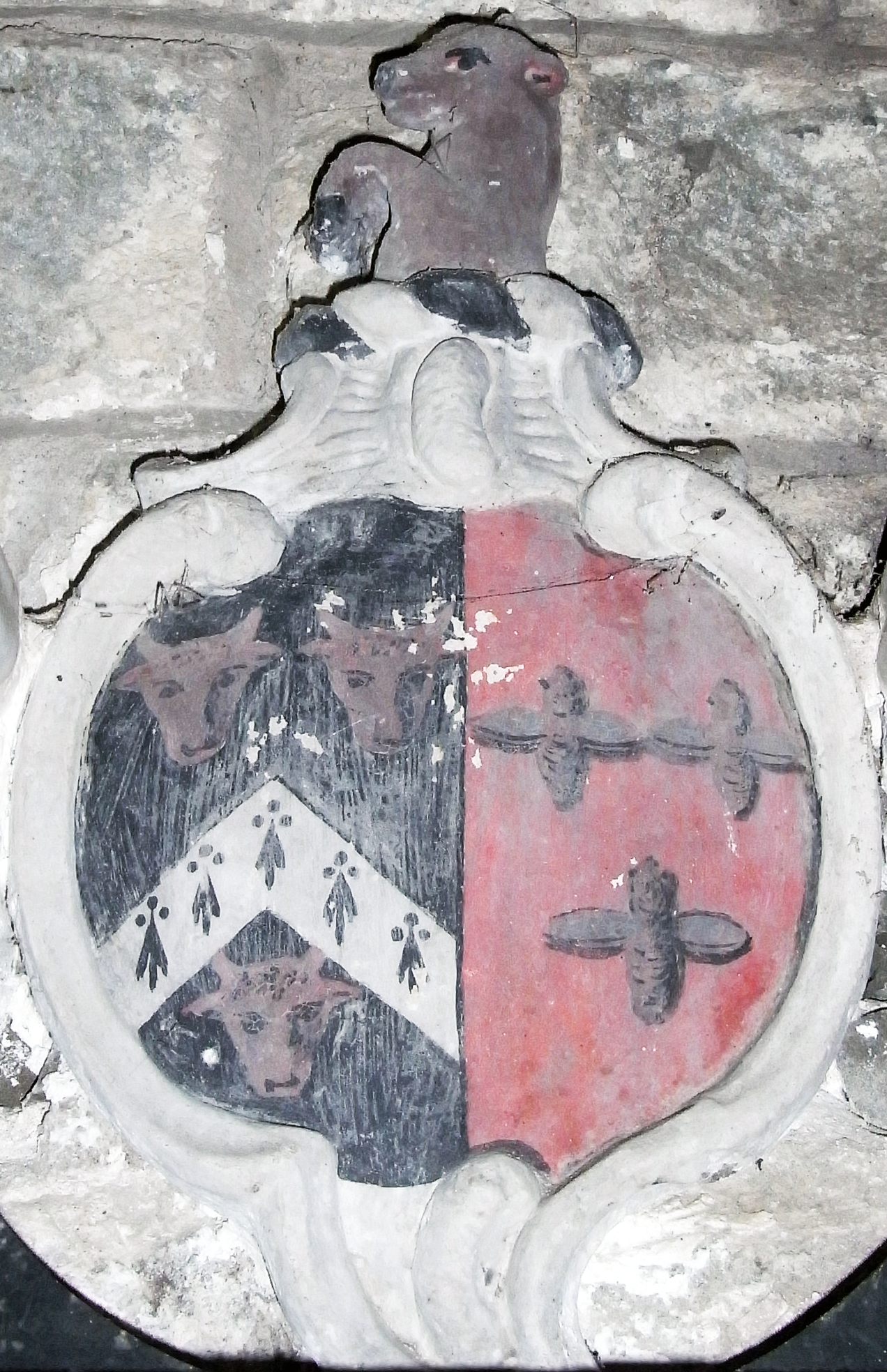
Arms of John Cunningham Saunders, Senior (d.1783): Sable, a chevron ermine between three bull's faces cabossed or, Crest: A demi-bull, Church of St James the Less, Huish

John Cunningham Saunders, M.D. (10 October 1773 – 10 February 1810) was an English surgeon and oculist, best known for his pioneering work on the surgery of cataracts. He founded the Royal London Ophthalmic Hospital, now known as Moorfields Eye Hospital.

== Origins ==
He was born on 10 October 1773 at Huish, Devon, England, the second son of John Cunningham Saunders (1737-Sept.1783), Esquire, of Lovistone in the parish of Huish, by his wife Jane (1742-1808). The mural monument of John Cunningham Saunders, Senior, survives in the Church of St James the Less, Huish, displaying the arms of Saunders (Sable, a chevron ermine between three bull's faces cabossed or) impaling those of his wife (Gules, three quatrefoils or). The will of an earlier John Cunningham Saunders "Gentleman of Great Torrington, Devon", near Huish, was proved on 14 April 1744. These are a differenced version of the arms of William Saunders (d.1481) of Charlwood in Surrey, (Sable, a chevron ermine between three bull's faces cabossed argent) who married Joan Carew, one of the daughters and co-heiresses of the prominent Thomas Carew of Beddington in Surrey. His great-grandson was Sir Thomas Sanders (sic) (fl.1653).

== Career ==
In 1805, "Out of compassion for the pitiful state of many soldiers returning from the Egyptian campaign afflicted with military ophthalmoplegia and trachoma infections", he founded the "London Dispensary for Curing Diseases of the Eye and Ear", a famous teaching institution, later known variously as the "Royal London Ophthalmic Hospital", the "London Eye Infirmary", today known as Moorfields Eye Hospital, of which Saunders remained the director from its founding in 1805 until he died in 1810.

In 1809, he became one of the first people in England to use belladonna for its mydriatic properties to facilitate cataract extraction.

== Death and burial ==
He died on 10 February 1810 and was buried in St Andrew's Church, Holborn, City of London, near the hospital he founded. The church at Huish in Devon contains an inscribed mural monument to him.

== Works ==
His book; A Treatise on some Practical Points Relating to the Diseases of the Eye. was published posthumously in 1811, edited by his colleague John Richard Farre. It was printed at the expense of the Governors of the Hospital, by subscription, to aid the author's widow.
