= Drummond baronets =

Extinct baronetcy in the Baronetage of the United Kingdom

There have been two baronetcies created for persons with the surname Drummond, both in the Baronetage of the United Kingdom. Both creations are extinct.

The Drummond, later Williams-Drummond Baronetcy, of Hawthornden in the City of Edinburgh, was created in the Baronetage of the United Kingdom on 27 February 1828. For more information on this creation, see Williams-Drummond baronets.

The Drummond Baronetcy, of Lasswade in the County of Midlothian, was created in the Baronetage of the United Kingdom on 27 June 1922 for Hugh Drummond. He was the third son of the fourth Baronet of the 1828 creation. The title became extinct on his death in 1924.

== Drummond, later Williams-Drummond baronets, of Hawthornden (1828) ==
- see Williams-Drummond baronets

== Drummond baronets, of Lasswade (1922) ==
- Sir Hugh Henry John Drummond, 1st Baronet (1859–1924) married Gertrude Emily (Lady Drummond), daughter of the late Hon. Mark George Kerr Rolle, and had issue:
  - Marion Edwina (born 1902), married on 1928 Julius Norton Goodwyn.
