= Clinton Devon Estates =

English land management and property company

The logo of Clinton Devon Estates is the arms of the ancient de Clinton family, Barons Clinton and Earls of Lincoln, used today by the Trefusis Barons Clinton: Argent, six crosses crosslet fitchée sable three two and one on a chief azure two mullets or pierced gules

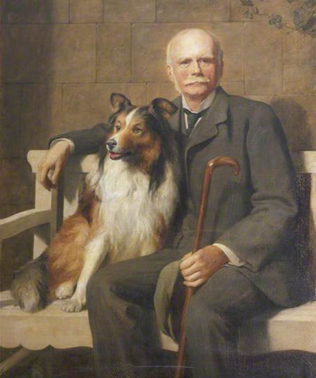
Hon. Mark Rolle (d.1907) (born Trefusis), the largest private landowner in Devon, with 55,000 acres. Portrait by Sir John Collier. A copy hangs in the boardroom of Lord Clinton's Clinton Devon Estates at East Budleigh

Clinton Devon Estates is a land management and property development company which manages the Devonshire estates belonging to Baron Clinton, the largest private landowner in Devon, England. Lord Clinton is of the Fane-Trefusis family, and is seated at Heanton Satchville in the parish of Huish, in Devon. The organisation's headquarters are situated on part of the estate at the "Rolle Estate Office" in the Bicton Arena at East Budleigh, near Budleigh Salterton, East Devon.

== History ==
The estates of Lord Clinton today derive almost entirely from two inheritances, in 1791 and 1842, by the Trefusis family, originally lords of the manor of Trefusis in Cornwall, both from different branches of the Rolle family of Devon: the Rolles of Stevenstone and Bicton (the senior line) and the Rolles of Heanton Satchville, Petrockstowe, a junior branch, also very wealthy. The Devon estates of the Rolle family were founded by the Tudor lawyer George Rolle (d.1552), whose family was of obscure origins in Dorset. He purchased the manor of Stevenstone near Great Torrington as his seat, and during the reign of King Henry VIII and of his son King Edward VI, acquired numerous other properties, many former monastic properties released following the Dissolution of the Monasteries onto the property market by the king at often very favourable terms.

=== Rolle of Heanton inheritance ===
The patriarch George Rolle purchased for his third son, Henry Rolle (d.1620), the marriage of a great heiress Margaret Yeo, daughter and heiress of Robert Yeo of Heanton Satchville, Petrockstowe. At that seat a junior line of the Rolle family lived for many generations, exploiting as their political power-base the pocket borough of Callington in Cornwall, purchased in 1601 by Robert Rolle (died 1633), grandson of George Rolle the Patriarch. This brought a seat and career in Parliament to many members of the Rolle family. The Rolle family of Heanton and its descendants continued until 1791, when the estates were inherited by the Trefusis family, and now form the northern centre of Devon Clinton Estates. This was due to the eventual heir of Margaret Rolle, suo jure 15th Baroness Clinton (1709-1781) having been her cousin Robert George William Trefusis (1764–1797), lord of the manor of Trefusis in Cornwall, who in 1794 successfully claimed the title 17th Baron Clinton. Trefusis and Margaret Rolle were both descended from the marriage of Robert Rolle (c.1622-1660) of Heanton Satchville, Petrockstowe and Lady Arabella Clinton, the younger daughter of Theophilus Clinton, 4th Earl of Lincoln, 12th Baron Clinton (d.1667). A later Trefusis Lord Clinton, having been forced by fire damage to abandon the ancient mansion house of Heanton Satchville in the parish of Petrockstowe, purchased a mansion in the adjoining parish of Huish and renamed the house Heanton Satchville, Huish, still the seat of Lord Clinton today.

=== Rolle of Stevenstone & Bicton inheritance ===
The landholdings of the senior line of the Rolle family, seated at Stevenstone, were greatly expanded in the 17th century following the marriage of Sir Henry Rolle (d.1617) to Anne Denys, a daughter and co-heiress of Sir Thomas Denys (1559–1613) of Bicton in East Devon and of Holcombe Burnell on the opposite (western) side of Exeter, which went to the other sister and co-heiress. The Rolle family, even without inheritances by marriage, was extremely acquisitive of land and estates in Devon. Denys Rolle (1725–1797) of Stevenstone and Bicton not only inherited from a second junior branch of the Rolle family the large manor of Chittlehampton in north Devon, together with the manor house of Hudscott, but also himself in 1786 purchased for the huge sum of £72,000 the manors of Otterton and East Budleigh, situated adjacent to Bicton, from the heirs of the Duke family, descendants of Richard Duke (died 1572) who in 1540 had purchased the former lands of Otterton Priory following the Dissolution of the Monasteries. He also acquired an estate in eastern Florida of 20,000 acres of virgin jungle, named Rollestown (on the site of today's San Mateo), in St Mark's in the Bay of Apalatchi, which was not a commercial success, and when following the Treaty of Versailles in 1783, Florida was ceded to the Spanish, it was exchanged by the government for an estate in the Bahama Islands, but at great loss to Rolle. The last in the male line of the senior Rolles was Denys Rolle's son John Rolle, 1st Baron Rolle (d.1842), who inherited the manor of Beer from his first wife Judith Maria Walrond (d.1819), the daughter and heiress of William Walrond of Bovey House, Beer, between Beer (near Seaton) and Branscombe on the south Devon coast, thus near Bicton. Lord Rolle failed to produce progeny by either his first or second wife, and being childless bequeathed his vast estates to Hon. Mark Trefusis (d.1907), second son of the 19th Baron Clinton, the nephew of Louisa Trefusis his second wife and widow, who was required by the will to adopt the surname and arms of Rolle, which he did by royal licence in 1852. Due entirely to the Rolle inheritance he was the largest private landowner in Devon, and according to the Return of Owners of Land, 1873 his landholdings, of which he was life-tenant under his uncle's will, extended to 55,000 acres. In 1907 he too died without male progeny when, in accordance with the entail created by the will of Lord Rolle, the Rolle estates descended to his nephew Charles Trefusis, 21st Baron Clinton (1863–1957) of Heanton Satchville, Huish, who thus united the estates of the three branches of the Rolle family: Rolle of Stevenstone and Bicton, Rolle of Heanton Satchville and Rolle of Hudscott. The 21st Baron Clinton sold Stevenstone in 1922, and the Chittlehampton (Hudscott) estate, including most of the village houses and farms within that large parish, was sold in the 1950s. The Barons Clinton then concentrated the remaining still huge Devon estates in two areas, one in mid-Devon comprising the estates of Rolle of Heanton Satchville, Petrockstowe, the other in east Devon comprising the Bicton, East Budleigh and Beer estates of Rolle of Stevenstone.

=== Fane-Trefusis ===
In 1957 the Trefusis family died out in the male line on the death of Charles Trefusis, 21st Baron Clinton (1863–1957), whereupon the estates descended to his eldest daughter Hon. Harriet Trefusis (d.1958), the widow of Major Henry Nevile Fane (1883–1947), Coldstream Guards, a descendant in a junior line of the ancient Fane Earls of Westmorland, whose heraldic canting motto Ne Vile Fano ("do not defile the altar") recalls their descent from the even more ancient Neville family, Earls of Warwick.

Major Fane, of Avon Tyrrell in Hampshire, was a son of Sir Edmund Douglas Veitch Fane (1837–1900), third son of Rev. Arthur Fane (1809–1872), of Boyton Manor, near Codford, in Wiltshire, domestic chaplain to his cousin the Earl of Westmorland and Rector of Fulbeck in Norfolk, the 2nd illegitimate son of General Sir Henry Fane (1778–1840), Commander-in-Chief of India, the eldest son of Hon. Henry Fane (d.1802), of Fulbeck Hall, Lincolnshire, a younger son of Thomas Fane, 8th Earl of Westmorland.

Harriet's eldest son Charles Fane had been killed in action in World War II but had left a six-year-old son, Gerard Fane (born 1934, died 2024), who thus became the eventual heir to the Trefusis estates and to the title Baron Clinton, which had fallen into abeyance between the daughters of the 21st Baron. In 1965 the abeyance was terminated in favour of Gerard Fane, who adopted the additional surname Trefusis and became the 22nd Baron Clinton.

=== Partial sale in 1958 ===
On 4 September 1958, shortly after the death of Charles Trefusis, 21st Baron Clinton (1863–1957), almost the whole of the North Devon estate was offered for sale by his heir to meet death duties. The property comprised 15,624 acres, including Hudscott House (the former Rolle seat) as lot 1, and the historic Brightley Barton, both in the parish of Chittlehampton, with 110 farms, 16 smallholdings, 125 cottages, numerous village shops, two licensed inns, with sporting rights including 5 miles of salmon fishing on the River Taw. The lands concerned were producing about £28,855 per annum in rents. The auction of 365 lots took place over four days at Great Torrington Town Hall (dominated then as today by old portraits on every wall of the Rolle family, former lords of the manor, including the massive portrait of Lord Rolle by Lawrence) from 13 to 17 October 1958. Many of the farms were purchased by their tenants.

== Landholdings ==
=== Residential property ===
The estate owns 350 houses mostly in villages, let mainly to established local families, unfurnished on assured shorthold tenancies, "maintained to a high standard through a programme of regular repair and painting".

=== Commercial properties ===
==== CCH Property Company Ltd ====
The estate's property investment and development business is operated by CCH Property Company Ltd. The estate owns properties elsewhere in England, but those in Devon include mixed office and retail in Tiverton, Exeter and Plymouth, with further south-west properties in Taunton in Somerset. The company is acquisitive and continues to buy commercial property in England. It claims to deliver "a professional service based on 500 years of property management experience", that is to say going back to the era of George Rolle (d.1552) who built up the first Devonshire estate of the Rolle family.

==== Industrial estates ====
The estate owns and lets commercial property to 120 small and medium-sized businesses which employ in total about 1,500 people, mainly in rural East Devon. The properties in East Devon include: Liverton Business Park, on the outskirts of Exmouth; South Farm Court, converted agricultural buildings one mile from Budleigh Salterton; Dotton Business Units, six converted agricultural buildings forming a light industrial estate near Bicton, between the villages of Newton Poppleford and Colaton Raleigh; the Old Sawmills Industrial Estate, a light industrial estate on the edge of Colaton Raleigh.

=== Farms ===
The estate owns and manages over 17,000 acres of farmland in Devon which comprise 34 farms of which 30 are tenanted (ranging in size from 150 to 750 acres), two are managed in-hand and two further farms are managed in-hand on a share-farming basis, a form of legal partnership.

==== In-hand farms ====
The two in-hand farms include a 2,800 acre organic farm with land situated mainly in the Lower Otter Valley. It is a mixed farm, with arable, dairy and sheep-breeding operations.

=== Community land ===
Part of the estate's lands are used as allotments for the use of small-scale vegetable and flower growing by schools, families and individuals in several towns and villages.

=== Sports fields ===
200 acres of land is used as community sports fields.

=== Bicton arena ===
The estate built and manages Bicton Arena and cross-country course as a facility for equestrian sports, "widely regarded as the finest equestrian facility in the South West".

=== Heathland ===
2,800 acres comprise the East Devon Pebblebed Heaths, one of the greatest areas of lowland heath in surviving in England, a valuable habitat for wildlife, principally rare birds and insects. Part is within land designated by the government as the East Devon Area of Outstanding Natural Beauty. It is not managed as a commercial enterprise, but is managed with joint financial input from the Estate, government grants and the East Devon Pebblebed Heaths Conservation Trust, which employs full-time wardens and volunteers to look after the terrain. The estate opened the heathland to public access "for air and exercise" following a legal deed it signed in 1930.

=== Woodlands ===
The estate includes 1,900 hectares of woodland, managed on a commercial basis. Charles Trefusis, 21st Baron Clinton (1863–1957) was especially interested in forestry and served as Chairman of the Forestry Commission from 1927 to 1929. That body had been established to re-stock the nation's timber following the depletion wrought by World War I, and after the Commission's first major planning meeting in London, two of the founding commissioners, Lord Clinton and Lord Fraser, both owners of large estates, held a competition to see who could plant the first new Commission Forest. Clinton reached home in Devon before Fraser reached his Scottish estate, and having arrived at Eggesford Station he immediately set his estate staff to work nearby in planting a forest of Douglas Firs, completed on 8 December 1919, now known as Flashdown Wood, part of Eggesford Forest. Without delay he sent Lovat a telegram announcing his feat, which was received as Lovat stepped off the train from London, having just completed the long journey to Scotland.

== Governance ==
Lord Clinton does not have an executive role in directing the operations, but is nevertheless "inextricably linked to all on the estate". Clinton Devon Estates is not an incorporated entity but is governed by trustees, "in partnership with the family". There are 30 different trusts involved in the governance structure. The present Director (which post was formerly known as "Agent" or "Steward") is John Varley, appointed in 2000, a former executive at British Telecom and an officer in the Territorial Army and a board member of the Government quango Environment Agency. His employment brief was "to put the estate on a more sound commercial footing and identify areas for growth, while also looking to the future". He stated in 2013: "A long-term mindset influences all I do... We have to make money while also thinking about what we are leaving. The family ethos underpins all. There is the whole principle of stewardship". Since 2000 he has refocused the business away from unprofitable and risky businesses such as selling tractors, garden machinery and furniture and onto core property and land operations and has doubled net income. He attended a course at the International Institute for Management Development business school in Lausanne, Switzerland, with Lord Clinton’s son and heir apparent Charles Fane Trefusis, the non-executive chairman of CCH, the property investment and development arm. The estate's 10-year plan in 2013 aimed to double income once more and to complete a £14m investment in phase two of the development of Liverton business park, including the building of 500 houses, and to invest in renewable energy projects.

Regarding his family's role in the business Charles Fane-Trefusis stated:

"The current generation take a strategic leadership role and employ professional managers to deliver the strategy. The family is actively involved in steering the business and influencing decisions relating to our impact on society and the environment particularly. Over recent decades the family has agreed and ensured a common purpose. More recently after successful engagement with IMD in Lausanne, a "Family Constitution" has been developed which is regularly reviewed and provides a focus for discussion and reflection".

=== Trustees ===
Trustees of Devon Clinton Estates include:

- Andrew Christie-Miller (born 1951), a chartered surveyor, former owner of the Clarendon Park Estate, Alderbury, in Wiltshire, a past Chairman of the Game and Wildlife Conservation Trust and Timber Growers UK, Chairman of Salisbury Cathedral Trust, Chairman of Ernest Cook Trust and a trustee of the Duke of Roxburghe's Roxburghe Estates, High Sheriff of Wiltshire in 1996.
- Lord Curry of Kirkharle, a farmer in Northumberland, cross-bench peer in the House of Lords, chairman of the Leckford Estate owned by the supermarket Waitrose, chairman of the Better Regulation Executive and previously chairman of the Delivery Group overseeing the Government’s Sustainable Farming & Food Strategy; a member of the Council of the Royal Agricultural Society of England and a trustee of the Lawes Trust, Rothamsted Research and a trustee of the National Farmers Union Mutual Charitable Trust.
