= Mark Rolle =

English High Sheriff and peer

The Honourable Mark Rolle
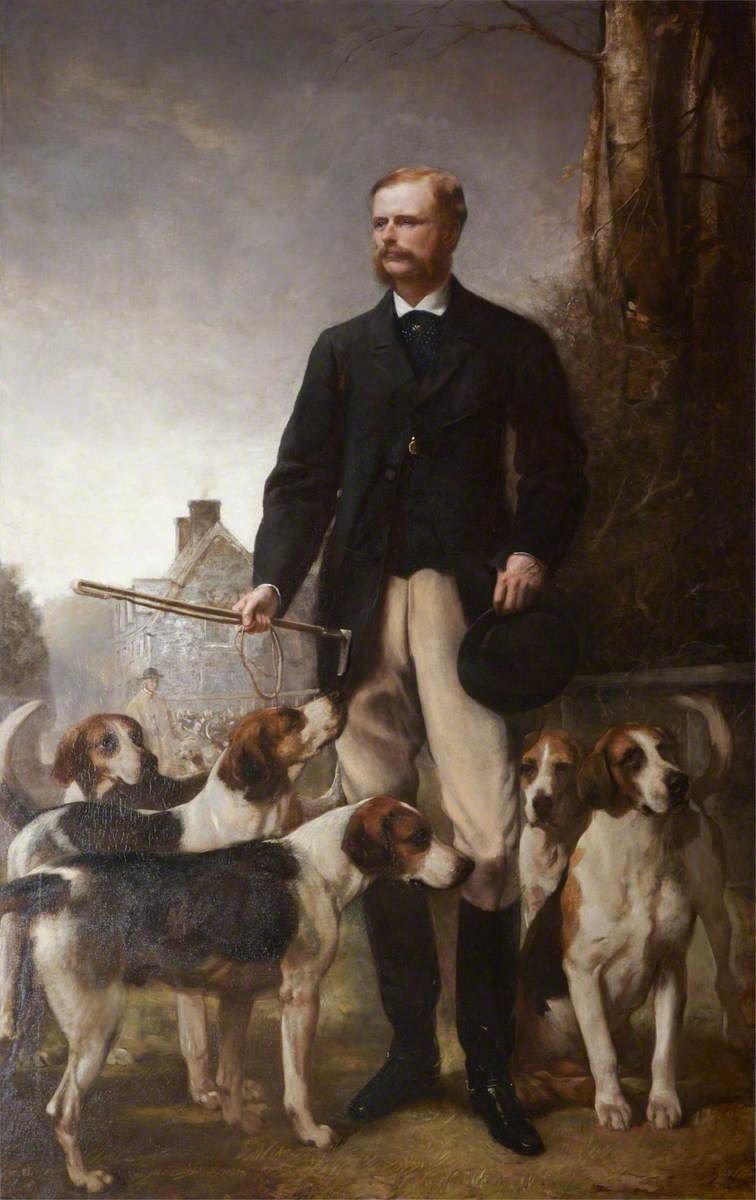
- 1871 portrait of Hon. Mark Rolle by Hon. Henry Richard Graves. Collection of Barnstaple Town Council, displayed in Council Chamber, Guildhall, Barnstaple
- Born: 13 November 1835; Huish, Devon, England
- Died: 27 April 1907 (aged 71); Argelès-sur-Mer, France
- Spouse: Gertrude Douglas (m. 1860)
- Children: 2
- Father: Charles Trefusis
- Relatives: Charles Hepburn-Stuart-Forbes-Trefusis (brother); Robert Trefusis (grandfather); William Kerr (grandfather)

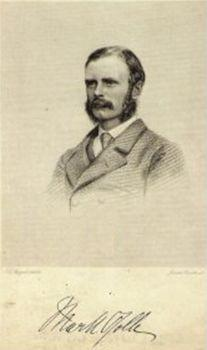
1870 portrait of Hon. Mark Rolle by Joseph Brown. National Portrait Gallery, London, NPG D10788

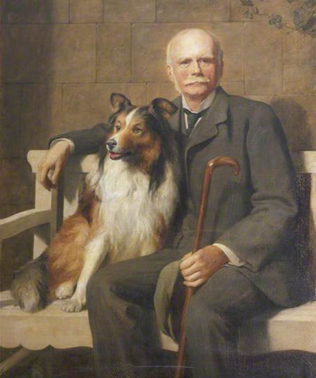
Portrait of Hon. Mark Rolle by Sir John Collier. Collection of Great Torrington Town and Alms Lands Charities, displayed in Great Torrington Townhall. A copy hangs in the boardroom of Lord Clinton's Clinton Devon Estates at East Budleigh

Hon. Mark George Kerr Rolle (13 November 1835 – 27 April 1907; né Mark George Kerr Trefusis), of Stevenstone, St Giles in the Wood, Devon, was High Sheriff of Devon in 1864, a DL of Devon and High Steward of Barnstaple.

Due to an inheritance from his uncle by marriage, John Rolle, 1st Baron Rolle (1750–1842), he became the largest private landowner in Devon, and according to the Return of Owners of Land, 1873 his landholdings, of which he was life-tenant under his uncle's will, extended to 55,000 acres. He was a prolific philanthropist and builder and restorer of churches, farmhouses and cottages, the latter for his estate workers.

== Origins ==
Arms of Trefusis: Argent, a chevron between three spindles sable

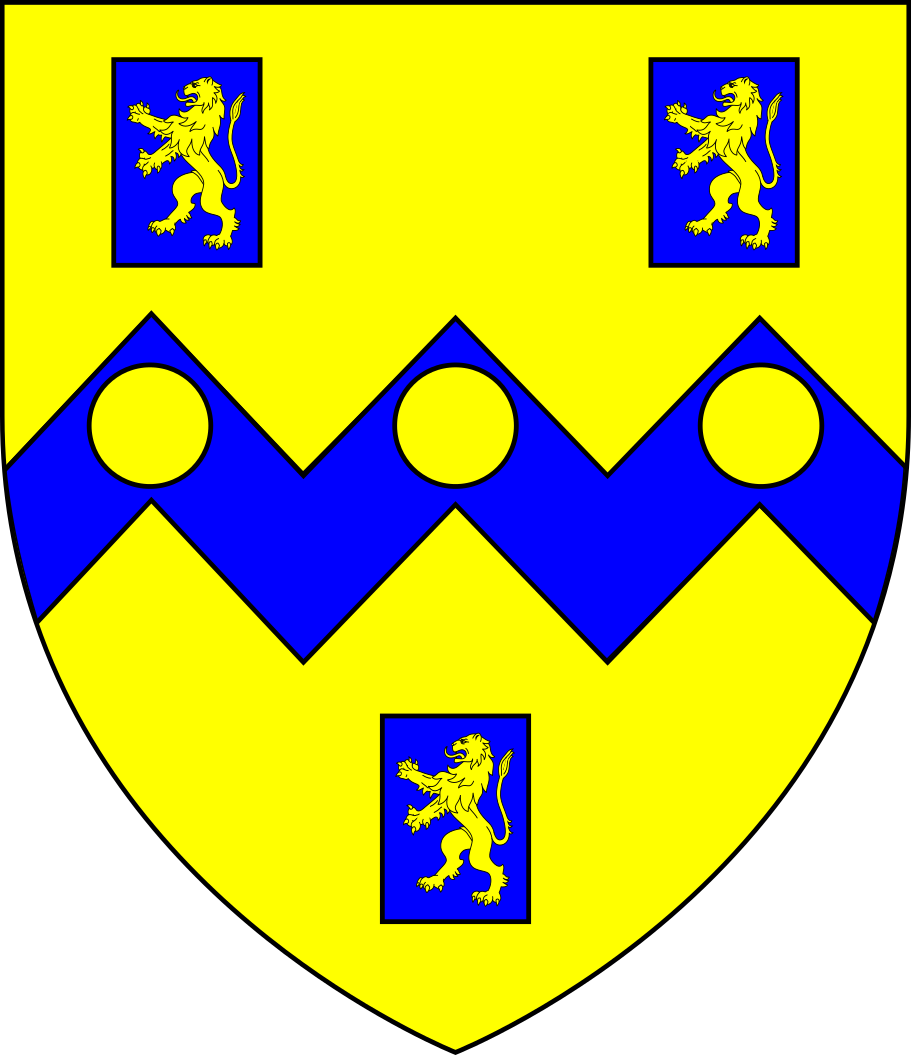
Arms of Rolle: Or, on a fesse dancetté between three billets azure each charged with a lion rampant of the first three bezants

The Honorable Mark George Kerr Trefusis was born on 13 November 1835 at Heanton Satchville in the parish of Huish, Devon, the 2nd son of Charles Rodolph Trefusis, 19th Baron Clinton (1791–1866) by his wife Lady Elizabeth Georgiana Kerr (died 1871), a daughter of William Kerr, 6th Marquess of Lothian. (Note: His parents had been married on 25 October 1831.) His eldest brother, Charles Henry Rolle Hepburn-Stuart-Forbes-Trefusis later the 20th Baron Clinton, received a large paternal inheritance in land of his own (albeit impoverished by mortgages and annuities to dependent relatives).

== Inheritance ==
At the age of 6 (in 1842), Mark Trefusis inherited the vast estates of his 92-year-old (Note: Age at death per monument in St Giles in the Wood Parish Church. The exact date and year of his birth is variously given in several published sources.) uncle by marriage, John Rolle, 1st Baron Rolle (1756–1842) of Stevenstone and Bicton. Rolle had married as his second wife Louisa Trefusis (1794–1885), Mark Trefusis's aunt. Rolle died childless and by his will made his wife's nephew, Mark Trefusis, his heir, as a life tenant in tail-male. Rolle's estates amounted to about 55,000 acres (220 km^{2}). As required by Lord Rolle's will on 30 January 1852 Mark Trefusis assumed the arms and name of Rolle by royal licence. He had attended Eton College two years earlier.

== Career ==
He was made Captain of the North Devon Yeomanry. In 1861, he was Barnstaple's High Steward. In 1864, he was made Sheriff of Devon.

== Marriage and issue ==
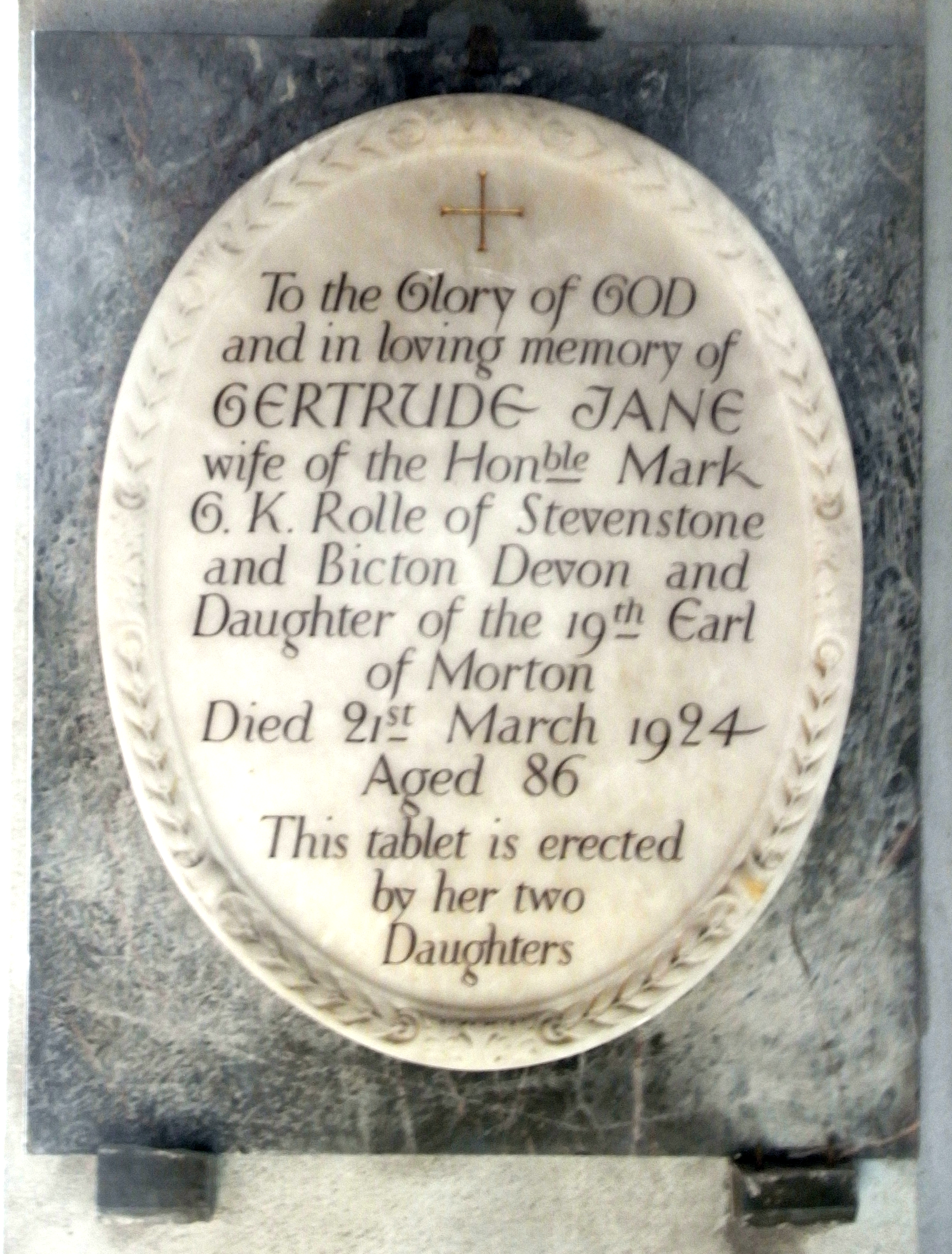
Mural monument to Gertrude Jane Rolle, erected by her daughters in St Giles in the Wood parish church. (Note: "To the Glory of God and in loving memory of Gertrude Jane wife of the Hon. Mark G. K. Rolle of Stevenstone and Bicton Devon and daughter of the 19th (sic) - Apparent error on tablet, Sholto George Douglas, 19th Earl of Morton (1844–1935) substituted erroneously for 17th Earl)

On 6 October 1860 in St Johns, Edinburgh, Rolle married Lady Gertrude Jane Douglas (1838–1924) a daughter of George Sholto Douglas, 17th Earl of Morton (died 1858). (Note: Boase that her father was George Sholto Douglas, 17th Earl of Morton.) Rolle produced no sons, thus the entail male under Lord Rolle's will precluded his daughters from the Rolle inheritance. His two daughters were:

- Gertrude Emily Rolle, who married Brig.-Gen. Sir Hugh Henry John Drummond, 1st Baronet (1859–1924) of Lasswade, a younger son of Sir James Williams-Drummond, 3rd Baronet, of Hawthornden. She had one daughter.
- Mary Frances Rolle (died 1945), who married on 7 June 1894 Major Arthur Scott Brown (born 1866) of Buckland Filleigh, North Devon. She had two daughters.

== Succession ==
His heir under the tail-male of Lord Rolle's will was his nephew Charles John Robert Hepburn-Stuart-Forbes-Trefusis, 21st Baron Clinton (1863–1957), who sold many of the estates to meet inheritance taxes.

== Manors held ==
Mark Rolle inherited the following manors and properties, amongst many others:

- East Budleigh, near Bicton, inherited by Denys Rolle (1614–1638) from his mother Anne Denys, it having been granted by King Henry VIII to her great-grandfather Sir Thomas Denys (c. 1477 – 1561), of Holcombe Burnell
- Exmouth, near Bicton, where Mark Rolle was the principal landowner. Inherited by Denys Rolle (1614–1638) from his mother Anne Denys, it having been granted by King Henry VIII to her great-grandfather Sir Thomas Denys (c. 1477 – 1561), of Holcombe Burnell
- Otterton purchased in 1786 by Denys Rolle (1725–1797) from the heirs of the Duke family.
- Buckland Brewer purchased in 1544 by the patriarch George Rolle (c. 1486 – 1552) following the dissolution of Dunkeswell Abbey.
- Great Torrington (lordship of manor of) purchased by Denys Rolle (1614–1638) from Sir William Fortescue.
- Woodbury, former estate of the Prideaux family, acquired in 1650 by Sir John Rolle (died 1706) from Sir Thomas Clifford.
- Colaton Raleigh acquired in 1650 by Sir John Rolle (died 1706) from Sir Thomas Clifford.

== Building development ==
=== Churches and almshouses ===
The following churches were either built, rebuilt or restored at the expense of Mark Rolle:

- Church of St Giles, St Giles in the Wood, rebuilt 1862–3,
- Church of St John the Evangelist, Warkleigh
- Church of St Michael, Beer. 1876–7 to designs of Hayward & Son.
- Church of St Peter, Budleigh Salterton, 1891–3, to the design of G. Fellowes-Prynne. This was the successor to the Chapel of the Holy Trinity, at the crossroads of Chapel Hill and East Terrace, built by Lord Rolle in 1812 as a chapel of ease to the parish church of his manor of East Budleigh. He referred to it in his will as "my chapel at Budleigh Salterton" and bequeathed the advowson to his wife, assuming she should continue to reside at Bicton. Following the expansion of the town as a sea-side resort, the chapel was too small for its purpose and Mark Rolle donated land at "The Lawn" for the site of a new church dedicated to St Peter, which he built at a cost of £10,000.
- Holy Trinity Church, Exmouth. The chancel was added by Lady Rolle in 1856 and Mark Rolle commissioned a total re-modelling (1905-7) by G. H. Fellowes-Prynne

=== Estate cottages ===
The Rolle estate terraced cottages in East Devon may be compared as a phenomenon of Victorian philanthropy to the cottages built in the west of the county by the Dukes of Bedford around their Tavistock estate.

- Beer, Common Lane, 1873. Flint-faced and brick-trimmed each with a spiked gable and porch. Deemed "especially appealing" by Pevsner.
- St Giles in the Wood,
- Woodbury, near East Budleigh, Rolle Estate housing of 1877.
- East Budleigh, Rolle Estate buildings, for example Sawmill Cottage (1876)
- Otterton, Rolle Estate cottages 1870s, and farm-houses, such as Lower Pinn (1851).

=== Stevenstone House ===
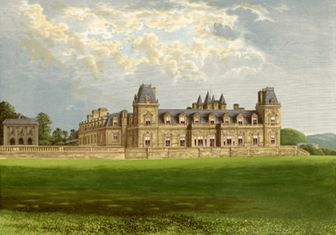
Stevenstone House, built by Hon. Mark Rolle between 1869 and 1873, and designed by Charles Barry Jr. Demolished. (Note: Surviving today is the Palladian library outbuilding, visible to the left, built by Lord Rolle's grandfather John Rolle (died 1730) which displays the arms of Rolle impaling the arms of his wife's family, the Walter baronets of Sarsden. The contemporaneous orangery behind it also survives, both now the property of the Landmark Trust. Published in Morris, Rev. F.O. Picturesque Views of Seats of Noblemen & Gentlemen of Great Britain & Ireland, London, 1880)

Mark Rolle's most ambitious building project was his complete rebuild of Stevenstone House, in the parish of St Giles in the Wood, the most ancient seat of the Rolle family in Devon, where they became established in the 16th century. He demolished the former house on the site in 1868 and built in its place between 1869 and 1873, to the plans of Charles Barry Jr., a huge mansion in the "Franco-Italian style".

=== Other ===
At Exmouth, where Mark Rolle was the chief landowner, he effected radical changes, in the opinion of Pevsner "of little architectural consequence". This appeared to be more of a commercial venture. This is situated around Rolle Street running into Rolle Road, named after him. He sold the Rolle Canal at Great Torrington, built by Baron Rolle 1822-4, to the railway company in 1871.

== Donations ==
At Woodbury, near East Budleigh, in 1870 he gave the site for the new school. In 1860 he built the "National School" in St Giles in the Wood, with space for 220 children, and erected a reading room in the village. He instituted a new curacy in Chittlehampton and paid the stipend, in which parish he also donated in 1902 a garden for the extension of the churchyard.

== Death and burial ==
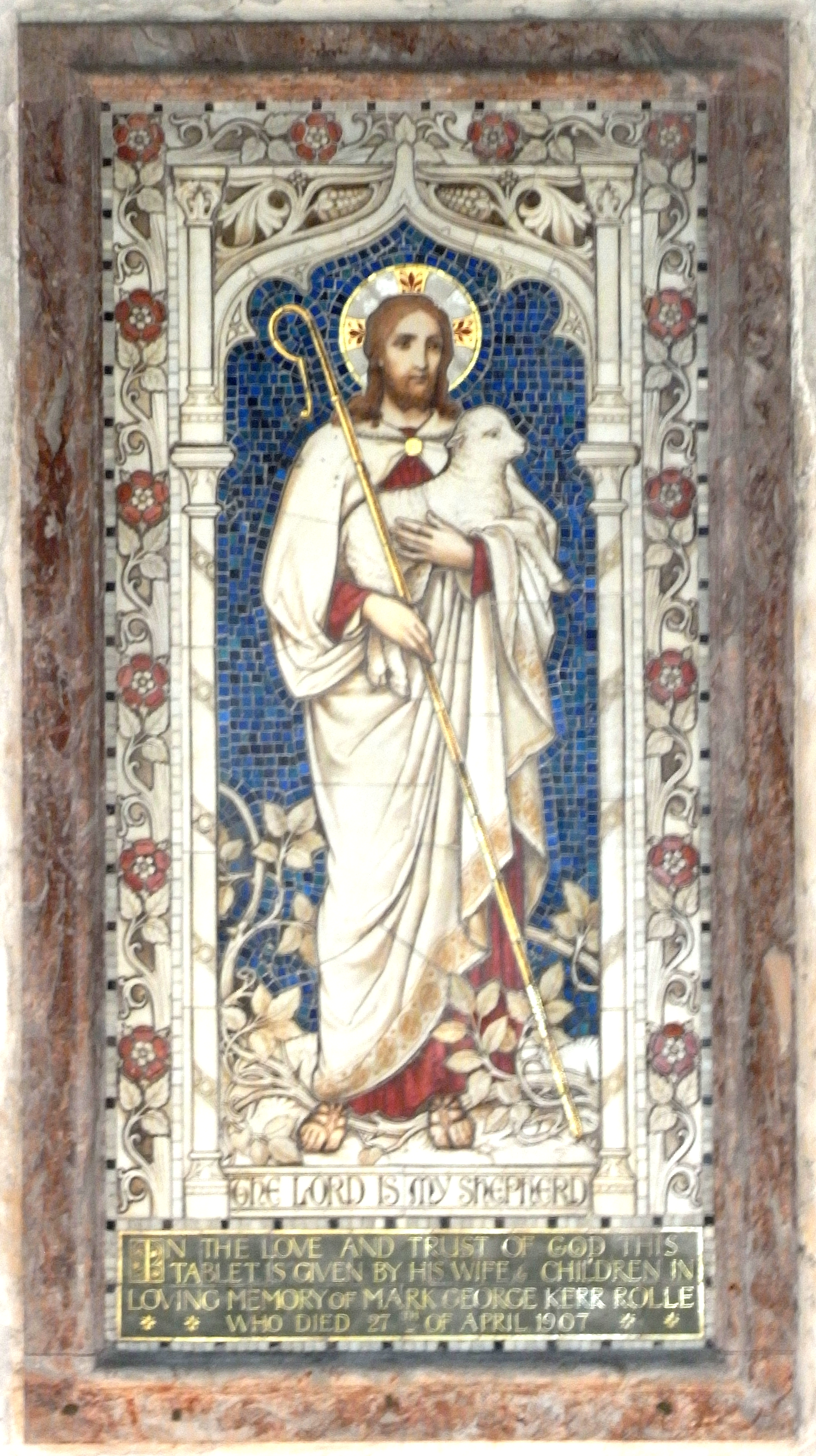
Marble mosaic mural monument to Hon. Mark Rolle (1835–1907) in St Giles in the Wood Parish Church. Inscribed: "The Lord is my Shepherd. (Psalms, 23:1) In the love and trust of God this tablet is given by his wife & children in loving memory of Mark George Kerr Rolle who died 27th of April 1907"

Mark Rolle died on 27 April 1907 at Argelès-sur-Mer in the South of France, and was buried not in a churchyard within a former Rolle manor, but in the Church of St James the Less in Huish, the manor and chief seat of the Trefusis family, Barons Clinton, of Heanton Satchville, Huish. He died without male issue, his heir to the Rolle estates, which were in tail-male, being his nephew Charles John Robert Hepburn-Stuart-Forbes-Trefusis, 21st Baron Clinton (1863–1957). Heavy death duties were payable by his heir, which resulted in the sale of Stevenstone, which was shortly thereafter demolished. Other parts of the North Devon Rolle estates were also sold, the family having decided to concentrate its holdings in East Devon around the historic core of Bicton. Monuments in his memory exist in Holy Trinity Church, Rolle Road, Exmouth and in the Church of St Giles, St Giles in the Wood. He is also commemorated by a large stone cross in the churchyard of St Michael and All Angels, Great Torrington.

=== Monuments ===
==== Beer Church ====
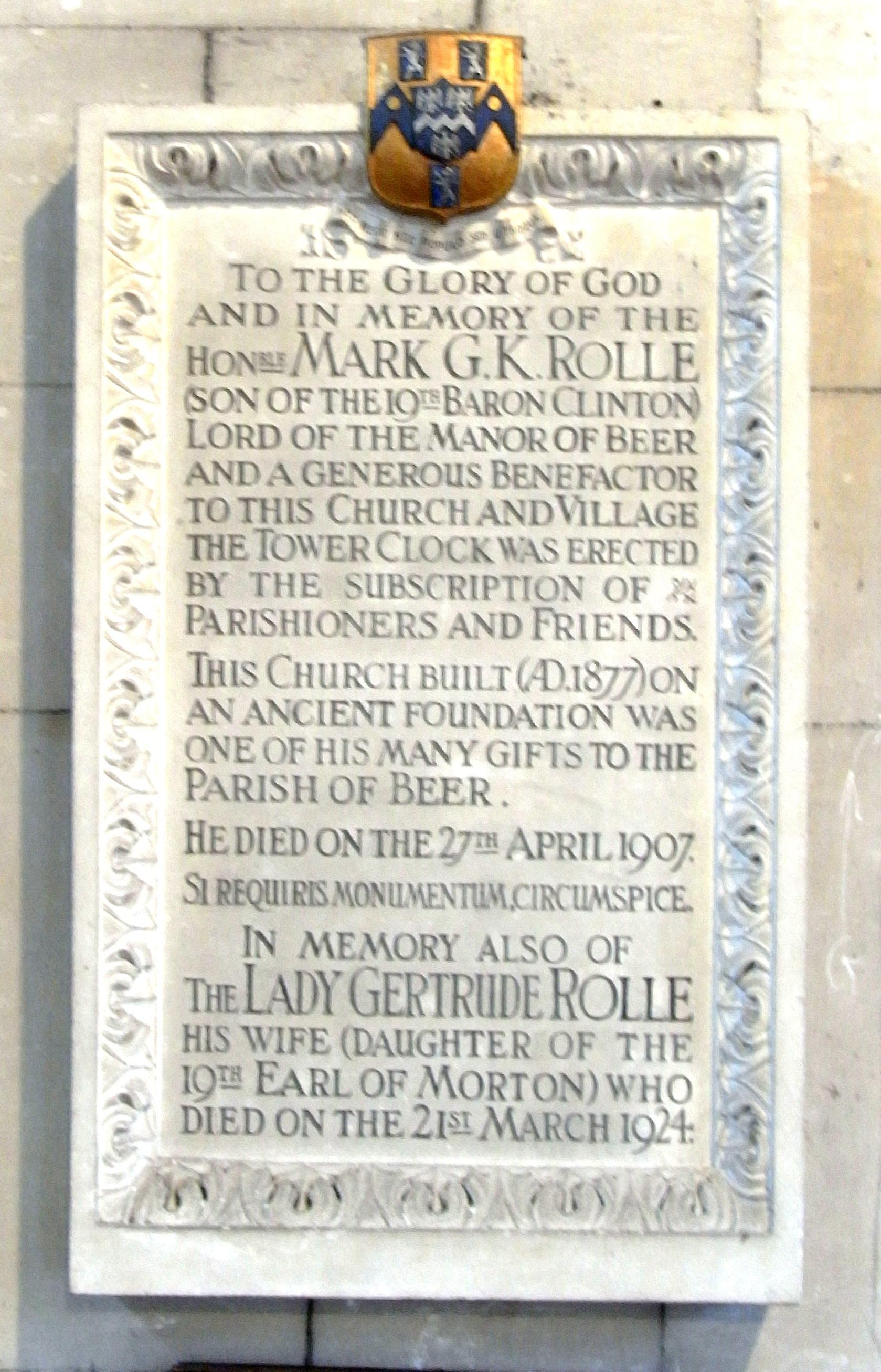
Monument to Mark Rolle in Beer Church

A memorial tablet exists in Beer Church, which he himself rebuilt, affixed to a north-west pier, with an inscription echoing that of Sir Christopher Wren in St Paul's Cathedral, built by him:

"To the glory of God and in memory of the Hon.ble Mark G.K. Rolle (son of the 19th Baron Clinton) lord of the manor of Beer and a generous benefactor to this church and village. The tower clock was erected by subscription of parishioners and friends. This church (built A.D. 1877) on an ancient foundation was one of his many gifts to the parish of Beer. He died on the 27th April 1907. Si requiris monumentum circumspice. In memory also of the Lady Gertrude Rolle his wife (daughter of the 19th Earl of Morton) who died on the 21st March 1924".

The armorials show Rolle with an inescutcheon of pretence of Walter of Sarsden, indicating the marriage of John Rolle (1679–1730), MP, of Stevenstone, grandfather of Lord Rolle, to the heiress of that family, Isabella Walter. These arms are also visible impaled by Rolle on the Georgian "Library Room" still surviving at Stevenstone.

==== Great Torrington ====
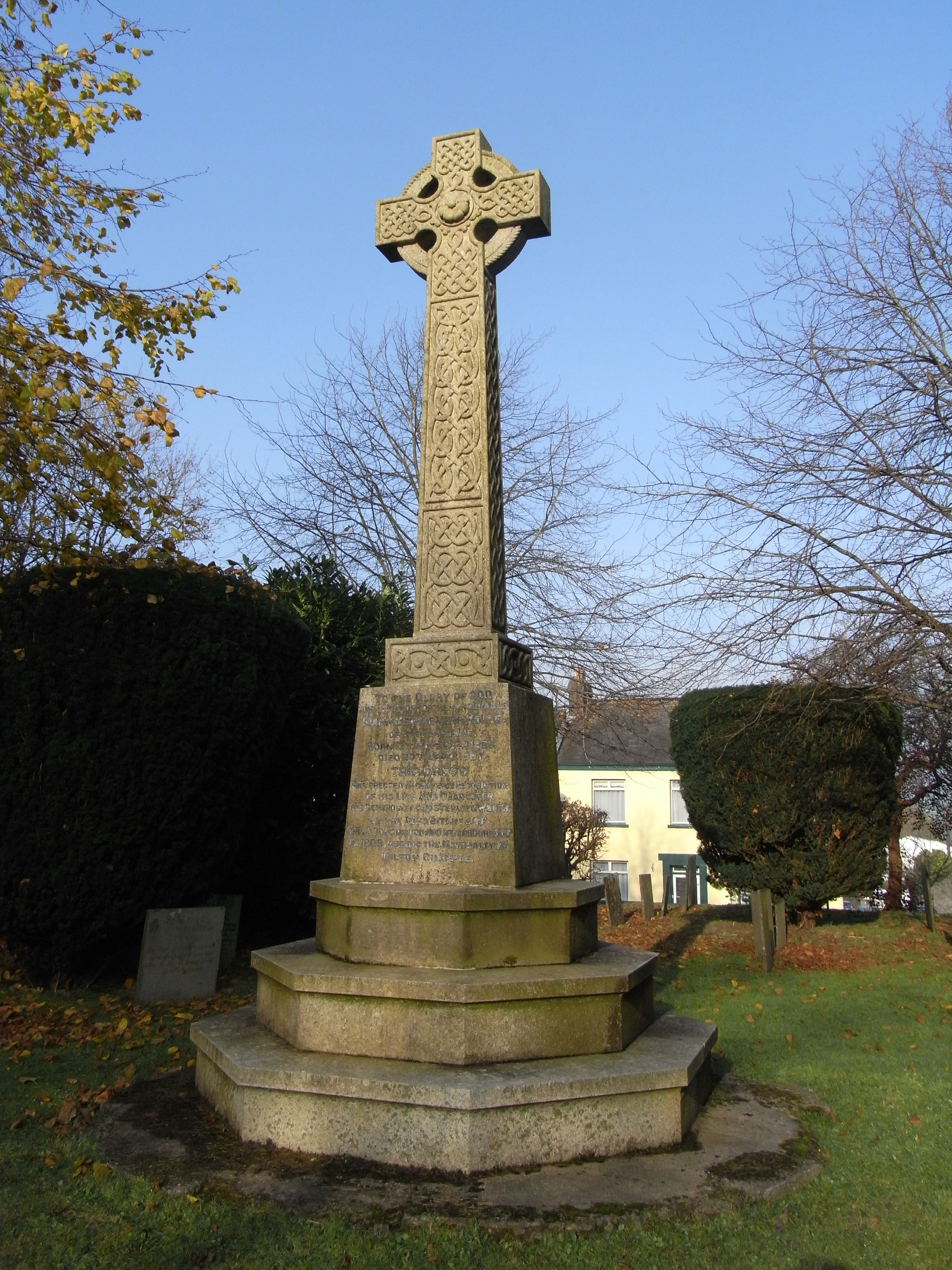
Memorial Cross to Mark Rolle in Great Torrington churchyard

A Memorial Cross to Mark Rolle exists in the churchyard by the west door of St Michael's Church, Great Torrington, with the following inscription: "To the glory of God and in memory of the Honourable Mark George Kerr Rolle of Stevenstone, born 13th November 1835 died 27th April 1907 this cross was erected in grateful recognition of his life and character, his generosity and sterling worth, by the inhabitants of Great Torrington and neighbourhood in 1909 during the mayoralty of Milton Chapple" In 1870 he also gave to the town of Great Torrington the fountain and clock in the square.

==== St Giles-in-the-Wood ====
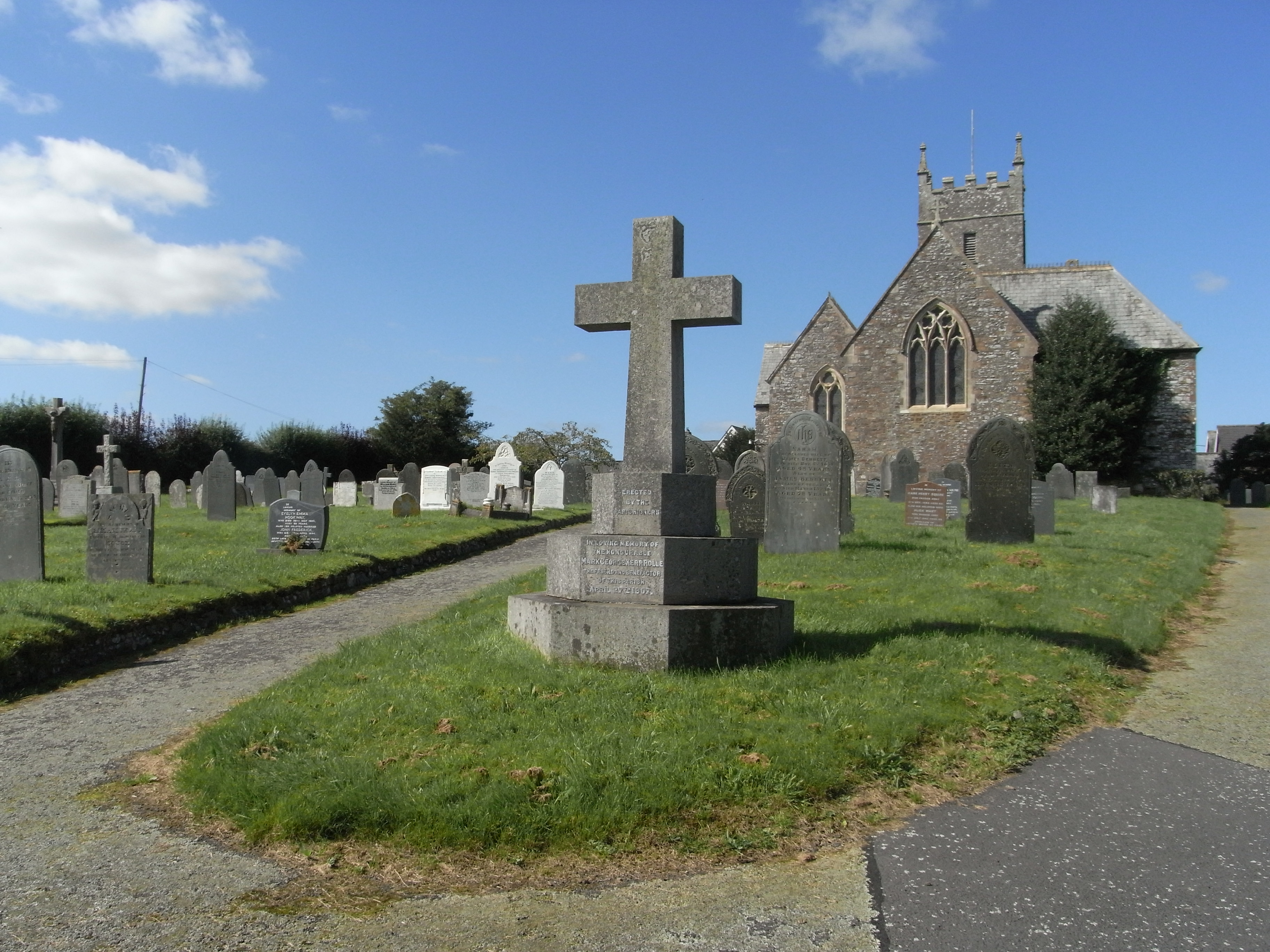
Memorial Cross to Mark Rolle, churchyard of St Giles-in-the-Wood

In addition to the mural monument within the church erected by his family, a memorial cross was erected at the east side of the churchyard of St Giles's Church, St Giles-in-the-Wood, directly in front of the lych-gate, with the following inscription: "Erected by the parishioners in loving memory of the Honourable Mark George Kerr Rolle the friend and benefactor of this parish. April 27th 1907"

== Sources ==
- J. J. Alexander; W. R. Hooper (1948). The history of Great Torrington in the County of Devon. Advance Studio.
- John Andow; Stella Levy (1 November 2000). Book of Chittlehampton: Celebrating a North Devon Parish. Halsgrove Press. ISBN 978-1-84114-057-5.
- Boase, George Clement; Courtney, William Prideaux (1878). Bibliotheca Cornubiensis: P-Z. Longmans, Green, Reader and Dyer.
- Bridget Cherry; Nikolaus Pevsner (1991). The Buildings of England: Devon. YALE University Press ACADEMIC. ISBN 978-0-300-09596-8.
- "Mark Rolle". Cricket Archive.
- "Devon Record Office 48/22/2/1 25 February 1731, East Budleigh; Littleham; London (St. Peter-the-Less)". National Archives. 25 February 1731.
- "Devon Record Office 48/22/2/2 25 March 1786 conveyance". National Archives. 25 February 1731.
- Joseph Foster (1891). The Royal Lineage of Our Noble and Gentle Families (principally Devonians) ... subscribers.
- The Genealogical Magazine. E. Stock. 1901. p. 296.
- Francis Orpen Morris (1880). A Series of Picturesque Views of Seats of the Noblemen and Gentlemen of Great Britain and Ireland: With Descriptive and Historical Letterpress. William Mackenzie.
- Lauder, Rosemary (2005). Vanished Houses of North Devon (Revised ed.). North Devon Books. ISBN 0-9528645-2-5.
- Margaret A. Reed (April 1985) [1977]. Pilton: its past and its people. Vineyard. ISBN 978-0-9510192-0-7.
- "History of St Peters Church". St Peters Church. Archived from the original on 21 August 2014.
- W.H. Rogers (2000) [1938]. M.F. Snetzler (ed.). Barcott, Buckland Brewer.
- John Lambrick Vivian; College of Arms (Great Britain) (1887). The visitations of Cornwall: comprising the Heralds' visitations of 1530, 1573 & 1620. W. Pollard.
- "Will of Lord Rolle (d.1842)". Prerogative Court of Canterbury Prob 11/1967 (accessed via genuki). Archived from the original on 1 February 2012.
- William White (1890). History, Gazetteer and Directory of the County of Devon 1890. William White.
