= Robert Trefusis, 18th Baron Clinton =

British Army officer and courtier

Colonel The Right Honourable The Lord Clinton
- Born: 28 April 1787; Trefusis, United Kingdom
- Died: 8 October 1832 (aged 45); Florence, Italy
- Burial place: St Mylor Church, Cornwall
- Education: Harrow School
- Spouse: Frances Poyntz (m. 1814)
- Relatives: Robert Trefusis, 17th Baron Clinton (father); Charles Trefusis, 19th Baron Clinton (brother)
- Military career
- Allegiance: United Kingdom
- Branch: British Army
- Service years: 1805–1832
- Rank: Colonel
- Units: 16th Light Dragoons; 41st Regiment of Foot
- Conflicts: Napoleonic Wars; Peninsular War; Battle of Bussaco; Siege of Ciudad Rodrigo; Siege of Badajoz; Battle of Salamanca
- Other work: Lord of the Bedchamber

Colonel Robert Cotton St John Trefusis, 18th Baron Clinton (28 April 1787 – 7 October 1832) was a British Army officer and courtier. He served as an aide de camp to Lord Wellington during the Peninsular War, and in August 1812 conveyed Wellington's dispatches on the battle of Salamanca to Britain, receiving two promotions in the space of a week. On half-pay from 1814, Trefusis became an aide de camp to George IV in 1825 and a Lord of the Bedchamber two years later. He died near Florence, Italy, in 1832 while attempting to recuperate from an illness. With no children having eventuated from his marriage, his brother Charles inherited the barony.

== Early life ==
Robert Cotton St John Trefusis was born at Trefusis in Cornwall on 28 April 1787, the eldest son of Robert Trefusis, 17th Baron Clinton, and Albertina Marianna née Gaulis. He had two younger brothers, Charles, a politician, and George, a Royal Navy officer. For his education, Trefusis attended Harrow School. His father died on 25 August 1797, leaving Trefusis to inherit as Baron Clinton. His mother died in the following year. While Trefusis remained a minor, the Clinton estate was managed by a trust and the politician John Clevland, alongside William Trefusis Reichenberg, was guardian to him and his brothers.

== Military career ==
With the Napoleonic Wars underway, Trefusis joined the British Army on 21 February 1805 as a cornet in the 16th Light Dragoons. He was promoted quickly, becoming a lieutenant on 18 December the same year and then a captain on 18 June 1807. Initially serving as an aide de camp to George III, in March 1810 Trefusis was sent to the Spanish Peninsula to partake in the Peninsular War. He was assigned as an extra aide de camp to Lieutenant-General Lord Wellington.

Trefusis saw action for the first time at the battle of Bussaco on 27 September 1810. He then returned to Britain in March 1811, before taking up his role with Wellington again in October. As such he was then present at the siege of Ciudad Rodrigo in January 1812, and the siege of Badajoz between March and April. Wellington then won the battle of Salamanca on 22 July which allowed him to occupy Madrid. He chose Trefusis to take his reports of the victory back to Britain.

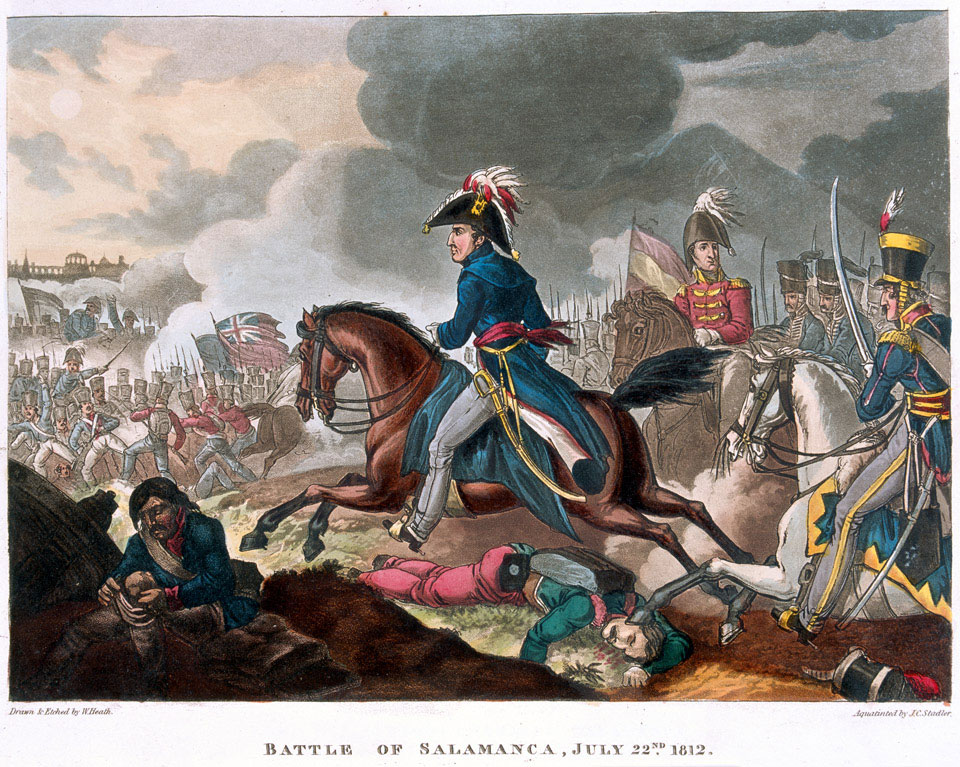
Wellington at the battle of Salamanca

Wellington had previously promised Trefusis that he would promote him to major; it so happened that the opportunity for this came about just as Trefusis was leaving for Britain with the Salamanca dispatches. Transferred to the 41st Regiment of Foot, he received the promotion on 13 August. He landed at Falmouth on 15 August; travelling up to London on the following day, he used a post chaise decorated with laurel wreaths with the captured French ensigns and imperial eagles sticking out of the windows. His arrival at Lord Bathurst, the Secretary of State for War's house, caused celebratory crowds to form. Trefusis and Bathurst read Wellington's dispatches at Downing Street and then walked to Carlton House to inform George, Prince Regent, of the battle, followed by a large crowd.

As a reward for his delivery of the Salamanca dispatches, Trefusis received a brevet promotion to lieutenant-colonel on 20 August, resulting in an effective double step in rank for him in the space of one week. While he did not return to Spain, Trefusis continued to serve actively in the British Army until 27 January 1814 when he transferred on half-pay to the 8th Garrison Battalion. He was further advanced to brevet colonel on 27 May 1825, the same day being appointed to serve as an aide de camp to the now-George IV.

== Politics ==
As Baron Clinton, Trefusis controlled the parliamentary constituency of Callington in Cornwall. A rotten borough, there were only about sixty voters for the two members of parliament. Between 1802 and 1818 Clinton's control of the borough was so secure that no elections were contested. He also controlled one seat in the Ashburton constituency in Devon, for which there were about 100 voters.

Trefusis supported the Ministry of All the Talents in 1806, allowing William Grenville, 1st Baron Grenville's government to pay for loyal candidates to fill his three seats. He moved his seats to supporters of the new Second Portland ministry in the following year, and subsequently managed them to ensure that his brother Charles could take one upon attaining his majority in 1813. In 1818 Trefusis, supporting the Liverpool ministry, annoyed the Callington electorate by putting forward two candidates unknown to them. They independently put up two opposition candidates, and while Trefusis still won, this difficulty combined with the need to pay each of his voters £20 (equivalent to £1,481 in 2025), made him desire to sell Callington. This was exacerbated in 1820 when his candidates for the borough lost to local independents, and in 1824 Trefusis sold Callington, totalling one street and sixty-five properties, for £30,000 (equivalent to £2,847,621 in 2025) to the politician Alexander Baring.

Trefusis kept control of Ashburton, for which he was the majority owner alongside Sir Lawrence Palk and then his son Sir Lawrence Vaughan Palk, throughout this period. A less controversial seat than Callington, Ashburton had no contested elections between 1761 and 1831; the younger Palk held his seat personally, while Trefusis used his control of the other to again support the Liverpool ministry and from 1828 the Wellington–Peel ministry.

== Courtier ==
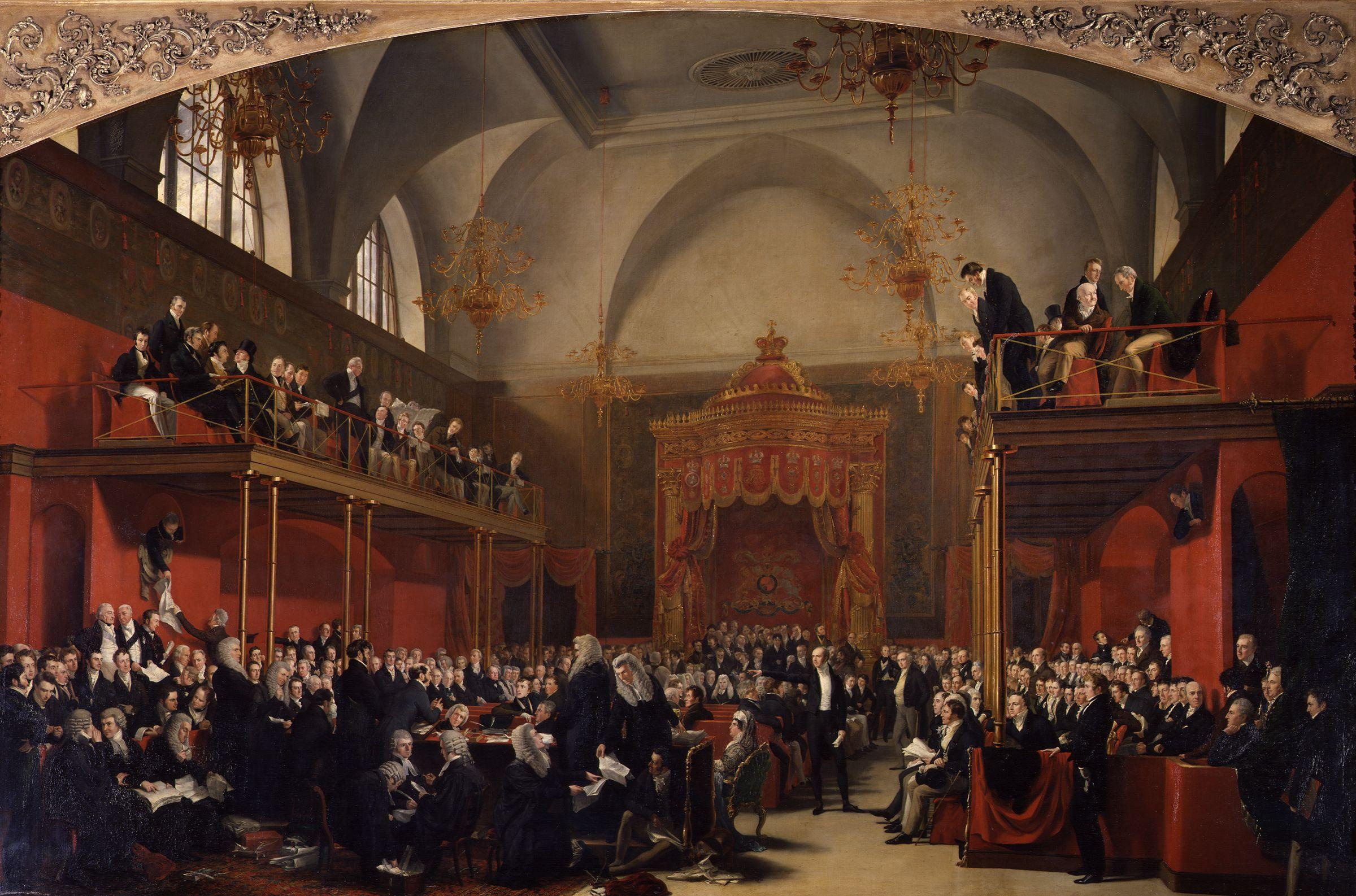
Trefusis is one of the lords depicted in The Trial of Queen Caroline.

Trefusis was the bearer of the great banner at the funeral of George III on 15 February 1820. As a member of the House of Lords he participated in the same year in the debates surrounding George IV's attempt to divorce Caroline of Brunswick, and was one of the lords depicted in George Hayter's painting The Trial of Queen Caroline. He was a signatory to two protests during the debates; one on 20 October relating to the acceptance of new evidence, and one on 6 November doubting the need to continue debates past the point of initial acceptance of Caroline's guilt due to the inconsistency of the allegations.

Trefusis was appointed a Lord of the Bedchamber to George on 22 August 1827. At George's funeral on 15 July 1830 Trefusis reprised his role as a bearer, this time of St George's banner. While en route to Naples in a bid to reverse his failing health, on 8 October 1832 Trefusis died near Florence, Italy. Subsequently returned to Britain, he was buried in St Mylor Church, Cornwall.

== Personal life ==
Trefusis married Frances Selina Isabella Poyntz, a daughter of the politician William Stephen Poyntz, in London on 4 August 1814. She served as a Lady of the Bedchamber to Adelaide of Saxe-Meiningen. With no children to inherit, upon Trefusis' death his barony went to his brother Charles as 19th Baron Clinton. Frances subsequently married Colonel Sir Horace Beauchamp Seymour in 1835 and died on 29 August 1875.

== Citations ==
Peerage of England
Preceded by Robert George William Trefusis	Baron Clinton; 1797–1832	Succeeded by Charles Rodolph Trefusis
