= Charles Trefusis, 19th Baron Clinton =

British peer and Tory politician

The Right Honourable The Lord Clinton

Member of Parliament for Callington
- In office 1813-1818

Personal details
- Born: 9 November 1791
- Died: 10 April 1866 (aged 74)
- Party: Tory
- Spouse: Elizabeth Kerr (m. 1831)
- Children: 11, including Charles and Mark
- Parent: Robert Trefusis (father)
- Education: Oriel College, Oxford

Charles Rodolph Trefusis, 19th Baron Clinton (9 November 1791 – 10 April 1866), styled The Honourable Charles Trefusis between 1794 and 1832, was a British peer and Tory politician. He succeeded to the barony following the death of his elder brother.

== Background and education ==
Clinton was the second son of Robert Trefusis, 17th Baron Clinton, and his wife Albertina Marianna Gaulis. She was the daughter of Jean Abraham Rodolph Gaulis (died 1788) of Lausanne, Switzerland, an important magistrate of that city. Her mother was Jeanne-Louise-Dorothée Porta, from another prominent Lausanne family. Her eldest brother, Clinton's uncle, was Abram Frederic Louis Juste Gaulis, a member of the Grand Council of Vaud and the heir and custodian of the Château de Colombier-sur-Morges, near Lausanne. Another of his Swiss uncles was Charles Gaulis (died in Germany 23 August 1796), who fathered a child by Mary Jane de Vial (later Clairmont). Clinton's cousin, Charles Gaulis Clairmont, who grew up as stepbrother to Mary Shelley, ended up as Chair of English literature at Vienna University.

Clinton was early orphaned: his father died in 1797 and his mother in 1798.

Clinton was educated at Eton and Oriel College, Oxford.

== Political career ==
Clinton was elected Member of Parliament for Callington in 1813, a seat he held until 1818. Between 1819 and 1833 he was a Commissioner of Excise. In 1832 he succeeded his elder brother, Robert Cotton St John Trefusis, 18th Baron Clinton as baron. This meant that he left the Commons and entered the House of Lords.

== Marriage and children ==
Lord Clinton married in 1831 Lady Elizabeth Georgiana Kerr (25 September 1807 – 19 March 1871), daughter of William Kerr, 6th Marquess of Lothian. They had four sons and seven daughters:

- Hon Emily Harriet Tefusis (6 Sept 1832 – 13 October 1904)
- Charles Hepburn-Stuart-Forbes-Trefusis, 20th Baron Clinton (2 March 1834 – 29 March 1904), his eldest son and heir.
- Mark George Kerr Trefusis (13 November 1835 – 27 April 1907), his second son, who in 1852 adopted by royal licence the surname and arms of Rolle following his inheritance of a life-interest in the estate of his maternal uncle John Rolle, 1st Baron Rolle (1756–1842), which made him the largest land-owner in Devon. The Rolle estate descended from him to his nephew Charles John Robert Hepburn-Stuart-Forbes-Trefusis, 21st Baron Clinton (1863–1957).
- Hon Mary Louisa Tefusis (29 November 1836 – 5 April 1903), married John Carpenter-Garnier and had six children, including Mark Carpenter-Garnier.
- Colonel Hon. Walter Rodolph Trefusis (5 January 1838 – 3 December 1885), Colonel of the 2nd Battalion, Scots Guards and Companion, Order of the Bath (C.B.); one of his five daughters (no sons), Marion, married Thomas Coke, 4th Earl of Leicester.
- Hon Adelaide Elizabeth Trefusis (1840 – 23 May 1866)
- Hon Evelyn Anne Tefusis (4 November 1841 – 28 February 1911), married the Hon Edward William Douglas and had one daughter.
- Hon Helen Evelyn Trefusis (9 May 1843 – 7 March 1923)
- Hon Gertrude Albertina Trefusis (21 July 1845 – 11 April 1878), married George Windsor-Clive in 1876. She died five days after giving birth to their only child, a son.
- Hon Alice Morwenna Tefusis (13 February 1849 – 16 November 1930)
- Colonel Hon. John Schomberg Trefusis (24 June 1852 – 29 December 1932), commanding officer of the 4th Battalion (1st Devon Militia), Devonshire Regiment, his last son and child; his son Denys married Violet Keppel.

== Death ==
He died in April 1866, aged 74, and was succeeded in the barony by his eldest son Charles Hepburn-Stuart-Forbes-Trefusis, 20th Baron Clinton. His widow died in March 1871, aged 63.

== Sources ==
Thorne, R. G. (1986). "TREFUSIS, Hon. Charles Rodolph (1791-1866), of Trefusis, Cornw". The History of Parliament Online. The History of Parliament Trust.

Parliament of the United Kingdom
Preceded by William Stephen Poyntz; Sir John Rogers	Member of Parliament for Callington; 1813–1818; With: William Stephen Poyntz	Succeeded by Edward Pyndar Lygon; Sir Christopher Robinson
Peerage of England
Preceded by Robert Cotton St John Trefusis	Baron Clinton; 1832–1866	Succeeded by Charles Hepburn-Stuart-Forbes-Trefusis
