= Robert Trefusis, 17th Baron Clinton =

English peer

The Right Honourable The Lord Clinton
- Born: 1764
- Died: 1797 (aged 32–33)
- Spouse: Albertina Gaulis (m. 1786)
- Children: 3+, including Charles
- Relatives: John St John (grandfather)

Robert George William Trefusis, 17th Baron Clinton (1764 – 1797) of Trefusis in Cornwall and Heanton Satchville, Petrockstowe in Devon, was an English peer.

He was the son of Robert Cotton Trefusis and his wife, Hon. Anne St John, and great-great-grandson of Francis Trefusis, whose wife Bridget was in remainder to the barony of Clinton through her mother Lady Arabella Rolle, daughter of Theophilus Clinton, 4th Earl of Lincoln. Trefusis succeeded to the barony in 1791 on the death of his third cousin George Walpole, 3rd Earl of Orford.

== Marriage ==
In 1786 he married Albertina Marianna Gaulis (d. 1798), daughter of Jean Abraham Rodolph Gaulis (d. 1788) of Lausanne, Switzerland, an important magistrate of that city. He is described as "notaire juré, conseiller, secrétaire baillival, banneret de la Cité". In 1779 he resigned as "secrétaire baillival" after 40 years' service and requested that his son J. Juste Gaulis should succeed him, who had seconded for him during the last three years of his term. The request was successful as the son was appointed to the position in 1780. Her mother was Jeanne-Louise-Dorothée Porta, from another prominent Lausanne family. Her eldest brother was Abram Frederic Louis Juste Gaulis, a member of the Grand Council of Vaud and the heir and custodian of the Château de Colombier-sur-Morges, near Lausanne. Another brother was Charles Gaulis (died in Germany 23 August 1796), who fathered a child by Mary Jane de Vial (later Clairmont). Charles Gaulis Clairmont, who grew up as stepbrother to Mary Shelley, ended up as Chair of English literature at Vienna University

Among the children of Albertina and Robert Trefusis were:

- Robert Cotton St John Trefusis, 18th Baron Clinton (28 April 1787 – 1 October 1832), married Marie Charlotte Mederacke.
- Hon Marianne Conventry Trefusis (31 May 1789 – 3 March 1806)
- Hon Anne Matilda Tefusis (28 June 1790 – 24 February 1876), married Edward George Moore, and was the mother of the 6th Earl Mount Cashell (1829–1915)
- Charles Rodolph Trefusis, 19th Baron Clinton (9 November 1791 – 10 April 1866)
- Captain George Rolle Walpole Trefusis RN (8 April 1793 – 1 March 1849)
- Hon Louisa Barbara Trefusis (29 December 1795 – 20 November 1885), Lady Rolle after her marriage to Sir John Rolle.

== Sources ==
- Thorne, R.G., biography of Trefusis, Hon. Charles Rodolph (1791-1866), of Trefusis, Cornw. (his son), published in History of Parliament: House of Commons 1790-1820, ed. R. Thorne, 1986
- Lauder, Rosemary, Devon Families, Tiverton, 2002, pp. 65–74, Fane-Trefusis.
- Vivian, J.L., The Visitations of Cornwall: comprising the Heralds' Visitations of 1530, 1573 & 1620; with additions by J.L. Vivian, Exeter, 1887, pp. 463–8, pedigree of "Trefusis of Trefusis".

Peerage of England
Preceded by George Walpole	Baron Clinton; 1791–1797	Succeeded by Robert Trefusis
