= Earl of Clare =

Title of British nobility

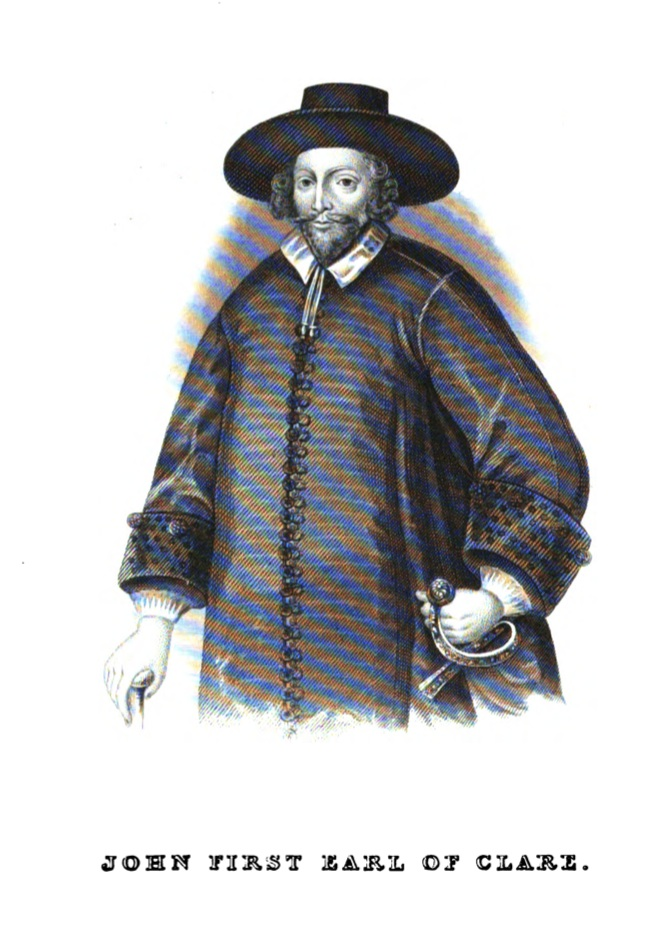

Earl of Clare was a title of British nobility created three times: once each in the peerages of England, Great Britain and Ireland.

The title derives from Clare, Suffolk, where a prominent Anglo-Norman family was seated since the Norman Conquest, and from which their English surname sprang from possession of the Honour of Clare. The Norman family who took the name 'de Clare' became associated with the peerage as they held, at differing times, three earldoms (Gloucester, Pembroke and Hertford).

== Honour of Clare ==
The death of the young Gilbert de Clare, Earl of Gloucester, at the Battle of Bannockburn (1314) entailed the break-up of the Honour of Clare, as he and his young wife were childless and the lands were distributed among three co-heiresses. His death marked the end of the great de Clare family. The family lands were worth as much as £6,000, second only to those of the Earl of Lancaster among the nobility of the realm.

The lands went into royal wardship while the matter of inheritance was settled. By the entail of 1290, the lands could only be inherited by direct descendants of the late earl's father. The late earl's sisters, Eleanor, Margaret (now widowed after the death of Piers Gaveston) and Elizabeth were by 1317 all married to favourites of Edward II: Hugh Despenser the Younger, Hugh de Audley and Roger d'Amory, respectively. The three were granted equal parts of the English possessions, but Despenser received the entire lordship of Glamorgan in Wales, politically the most important of the de Clare lands.

== Possible medieval earls ==
The "Earl of Clare" was probably not a medieval title. Some contemporary sources called them "Earls of Clare", but many modern historians treat this as if it were a "styled" (self-assumed) title. There was no standardised method of reference to earls in the late eleventh and twelfth centuries, and the Clares were one of a handful referred to as earls in this period without a county mentioned. For example, Gerald of Wales recounts an incident relating to the Earl of Clare, possibly referring to William Fitz Robert, 2nd Earl of Gloucester. Such references led some older historians to assume the Earls of Gloucester and Hertford also carried the title Earls of Clare. The title, for instance, is given in the original Dictionary of National Biography. The confusion probably stems from misinterpretation of references, such as that of "Earl Gilbert de Clare", in which Clare was taken as a title rather than a surname. One view is there was no such title in existence, and that the first creation of the title Earl of Clare dates to 1624. However, John Burke in 1831 states that prior to the 1624 creation, Robert Rich, Earl of Warwick, was to be created Earl of Clare, but that it was refused by the crown lawyers, "on a solemn declaration, that it was a title peculiar to the royal blood and not to be conferred upon a subject."

== Earl of Clare, first creation (1624) ==
Arms of Holles, first Earls of Clare: Ermine, two piles in point sable

The title of Earl of Clare was formally created by letters patent in the peerage of England on 2 November 1624 for John Holles. He was first elevated to the peerage as Baron Houghton of Houghton by King James I on 9 July 1616. According to Burke, he was ennobled thanks to the influence of the George Villiers, Viscount Villiers, future Duke of Buckingham, to whom Holles paid £10,000 (equivalent to £2,198,000 in 2025). He was created Earl of Clare following an additional payment of £5,000.

The fourth earl married Lady Margaret Cavendish, third daughter and co-heir of Henry Cavendish, 2nd Duke of Newcastle, and he inherited the majority of the Duke's estates upon his death in 1691. On 14 May 1694, he was created Marquess of Clare and Duke of Newcastle-upon-Tyne.

The fourth earl's only child, Lady Henrietta Cavendish Holles, married Edward Harley, 2nd Earl of Oxford and Earl Mortimer. Their daughter, Lady Margaret Cavendish Harley, who married William Bentinck, 2nd Duke of Portland.

The title became extinct upon the death of the fourth earl in 1711.

- John Holles, 1st Earl of Clare (1564–1637)
- John Holles, 2nd Earl of Clare (1595–1666)
- Gilbert Holles, 3rd Earl of Clare (1633–1689)
- John Holles, 4th Earl of Clare (1662–1711), created Marquess of Clare and Duke of Newcastle-upon-Tyne in 1694

== Earl of Clare, second creation (1714) ==
Arms of Thomas Pelham-Holles, 1st Duke of Newcastle, of the second creation, featuring the Holles arms quartered with the Pelham canting arms

The next creation of the Earl of Clare was in the Peerage of Great Britain for Thomas Pelham, nephew and heir of the last earl of the first creation. He had been adopted by his uncle and assumed the arms and surname of Holles. He was a significant statesman during the early Georgian era, and he served as the First Lord of the Treasury, among other roles.

He was created Viscount Pelham of Houghton and Earl of Clare on 26 October 1714.

=== Marquess of Clare (1715) ===
The following year, on 2 August 1715, he was further created Marquess of Clare and Duke of Newcastle, with remainder to his brother the Rt. Hon. Henry Pelham. In 1756, he was created Duke of Newcastle Under Lyne with remainder to his nephew, Henry Fiennes-Clinton, 9th Earl of Lincoln. His brother predeceased him, leaving no male heirs, and at his death in 1768, the titles of Earl of Clare and Marquess of Clare again became extinct, but he was succeeded by his nephew as Duke of Newcastle Under Lyne.

- Thomas Pelham-Holles, Earl of Clare (1693–1768), created Marquess of Clare and Duke of Newcastle in 1715

== Earls of Clare, third creation (1795) ==
Arms of FitzGibbon: Ermine a saltire gules on a chief or, three annulets of the second.

The title was again created, in the peerage of Ireland, in 1795 for John FitzGibbon, 1st Viscount FitzGibbon, the Lord Chancellor of Ireland. He had already been created Baron FitzGibbon, of Lower Connello in the County of Limerick, in 1789, and Viscount FitzGibbon, of Limerick in the County of Limerick, in 1793. These titles were also in the peerage of Ireland. In 1799 he was made Baron FitzGibbon, of Sidbury in the County of Devon, in the peerage of Great Britain. He was succeeded by his eldest son, the second Earl. He served as Governor of Bombay from 1830 to 1834. He died childless and was succeeded by his younger brother, the third earl. He represented County Limerick in the House of Commons and served as Lord Lieutenant of County Limerick. Lord Clare's only son, John Charles Henry FitzGibbon, styled Viscount FitzGibbon, was killed in action during the Battle of Balaclava where he charged with the 8th King's Royal Irish Hussars. On Lord Clare's death in 1864 the peerages became extinct.

- John FitzGibbon, 1st Earl of Clare (1748–1802)
- John FitzGibbon, 2nd Earl of Clare (1792–1851)
- Richard Hobart FitzGibbon, 3rd Earl of Clare (1793–1864)

Family Tree of the Dukes of Newcastle, Earls of Lincoln (8th creation) and Earls of Clare

Baron Clinton (8th creation), 1298
John Clinton d. 1315; 1st Baron Clinton
Baron de Clynton, cr. 1330
John Clinton d. c. 1335; 2nd Baron Clinton	William de Clinton c. 1304 – 1354; Earl of Huntingdon, Baron de Clynton
Barony de Clynton extinct, 1354
John Clinton d. 1398; 3rd Baron Clinton
William Clinton dvp. 1383
William Clinton; 1378–1431; 4th Baron Clinton
Baron Ogle, 1461
John Clinton; 1410–1464; 5th Baron Clinton; Attainted, 1459; restored, 1461	Robert Ogle; 1406–1469; 1st Baron Ogle
John Clinton c. 1429 – 1488; 6th Baron Clinton	Owen (Ewyn) Ogle; 1440–1486; 2nd Baron Ogle
John Clinton c. 1470 – 1514; 7th Baron Clinton	Ralph Ogle; 1468–1513; 3rd Baron Ogle
Thomas Clinton; 1490–1517; 8th Baron Clinton	Robert Ogle; 1490–1530; 4th Baron Ogle
Earl of Lincoln (8th creation), 1572
Edward Clinton; 1512–1585; 1st Earl of Lincoln, 9th Baron Clinton	Robert Ogle; 1513/1527 – 1545; 5th Baron Ogle
Henry Clinton; 1539–1616; 2nd Earl of Lincoln, 10th Baron Clinton	Robert Ogle; 1529–1562; 6th Baron Ogle	Cuthbert Ogle c. 1540 – 1597; 7th Baron Ogle	William Cavendish c. 1505 – 1557	Bess of Hardwick c. 1527 – 1608
Earldom of Ogle abeyant, 1597
Earl of Ogle abeyance ended, 1628
Thomas Clinton; 1568–1619; 3rd Earl of Lincoln, 11th Baron Clinton	Edward Clinton; 1572–1623	Catherine Ogle; 1568/69/1570–1629; 8th Baroness Ogle	Charles Cavendish; 1553–1617	Frances Cavendish; 1548–1632	Henry Pierrepont; 1546–1615	see Earls & Dukes of Devonshire
Viscount Mansfield, 1620; Earl of Newcastle upon Tyne, 1628; Marquess of Newcastle-upon-Tyne, 1643; Duke of Newcastle-Upon-Tyne (1st creation) and Earl of Ogle, 1665	Earl of Clare (1st creation, 1624)
Henry Clinton later Fynes; 1587–1641	William Cavendish; 1592–1676; 1st Duke (and Marquess and Earl) of Newcastle-upon-Tyne and Viscount Mansfield, 9th Baron Ogle	Robert Pierrepont; 1584–1643; 1st Earl of Kingston-upon-Hull	John Holles; 1564–1637; 1st Earl of Clare
Baron Holles of Ifield in the County of Sussex
Theophilus Clinton; 1600–1667; 4th Earl of Lincoln, 12th Baron Clinton	Francis Clinton; 1610–1681	William Pierrepont c. 1607 – 1678	John Holles; 1595–1666; 2nd Earl of Clare	Denzil Holles; 1599–1680; 1st Baron Holles
Baronet of Winterbourne in the County of Dorset, 1660
Edward Clinton; 1624–1657	Francis Clinton; 1635–1693; 6th Earl of Lincoln	Norreys Fynes; 1617–1693	Henry Cavendish; 1630–1691; 2nd Duke (and Marquess and Earl) of Newcastle-upon-Tyne and Viscount Mansfield, 9th Baron Ogle	Frances Pierrepont; 1630–1695	Grace Pierrepont; 1633–1702	Gilbert Holles; 1633–1689; 3rd Earl of Clare	Francis Holles; 1627–1690; 2nd Baron Holles, 1st Baronet
Barony Ogle abeyant and all other titles extinct, 1691
Duke of Newcastle-Upon-Tyne (2nd creation) and Marquess of Clare (1st creation), 1694	Baron Pelham of Laughton, 1706; Baron Pelham of Stanmer, 1762
Edward Clinton; 1645–1692; 5th Earl of Lincoln, 13th Baron Clinton	Norreys Fynes; 1651–1736	Margaret Cavendish; 1661–1716	John Holles; 1662–1711; Duke of Newcastle-upon-Tyne and Marquess of Clare, 4th Earl of Clare	Grace Holles c. 1668 – 1700	Thomas Pelham; 1653–1712; Baron Pelham of Laughton and of Stanmer, 4th Pelham baronet, of Laughton	Denzil Holles; 1675–c. 1692; 3rd Baron Holles, 1st Baronet
All titles extinct, 1711	Both titles extinct, c. 1692
Earl of Clare (2nd creation, 1714; Duke of Newcastle-Upon-Tyne (3rd creation) and Marquess of Clare (2nd creation), 1715; Duke of Newcastle-Under-Lyne, 1756
Kendal Fynes; 1692–1740	Henry Clinton; 1684–1728; 7th Earl of Lincoln	Lucy Pelham; 1695–1736	Henry Pelham; 1694–1754	Thomas Pelham-Holles; 1693–1768; Duke of Newcastle-upon-Tyne, 1st Duke of Newcastle-under-Lyne, Marquess of Clare, Earl of Clare
All titles except Dukedom of Newcastle-under-Lyne extinct, 1768
Duke of Newcastle-Under-Lyne, 1756 (succeeded by special remainder, 1768)
Norreys Fynes; 1720–1764	George Clinton; 1718–1730; 8th Earl of Lincoln	Henry Pelham-Clinton; 1720–1794; 2nd Duke of Newcastle-under-Lyne, 9th Earl of Lincoln	Catherine Pelham; 1727–1760
Baron FitzGibbon, of Lower Connello in the County of Limerick (Ire), 1789; Viscount of Clare (Ire), 1793; Earl of Clare (Ire 3rd creation), 1795; Baron FitzGibbon, of Sidbury in the County of Devon (GB), 1799
John FitzGibbon; 1748–1802; 1st Earl of Clare	The FitzGibbon Earls of Clare are seemingly unrelated to the Holles family, the previous Earls of Clare.	Charles Fynes later Fynes Clinton; 1748–1827	Henry Pelham-Clinton; 1750–1778; Earl of Lincoln	Thomas Pelham-Clinton; 1752–1795; 3rd Duke of Newcastle-under-Lyne, 10th Earl of Lincoln
John FitzGibbon; 1792–1851; 2nd Earl of Clare	Richard Hobart FitzGibbon; 1793–1864; 3rd Earl of Clare	Clinton James Fynes Clinton later Fiennes-Clinton; 1792–1833	Henry Pelham-Clinton; 1785–1851; 4th Duke of Newcastle-under-Lyne, 11th Earl of Lincoln
Earldom of Clare extinct, 1864
Henry Fiennes-Clinton; 1826–1911	Henry Pelham-Clinton; 1811–1864; 5th Duke of Newcastle-under-Lyne, 12th Earl of Lincoln	Charles Pelham-Clinton; 1813–1894
Charles Edward Fiennes-Clinton; 1855–1888	Henry Pelham-Clinton; 1834–1879; 6th Duke of Newcastle-under-Lyne, 13th Earl of Lincoln	Charles Pelham-Clinton; 1857–1911
Edward Henry Fiennes-Clinton; 1886–1916	Henry Pelham-Clinton; 1864–1928; 7th Duke of Newcastle-under-Lyne, 14th Earl of Lincoln	Francis Pelham-Clinton-Hope; 1866–1941; 8th Duke of Newcastle-under-Lyne, 15th Earl of Lincoln	Guy Pelham-Clinton; 1894–1934
Edward Horace Fiennes-Clinton; 1913–2001; 18th Earl of Lincoln	Henry Pelham-Clinton-Hope; 1907–1988; 9th Duke of Newcastle-under-Lyne, 16th Earl of Lincoln	Edward Pelham-Clinton; 1920–1988; 10th Duke of Newcastle-under-Lyne, 17th Earl of Lincoln
Dukedom of Newcastle-upon-Tyne extinct, 1988
Edward Gordon Fiennes-Clinton; 1943–1999
Robert Edward Fiennes-Clinton b. 1972; 19th Earl of Lincoln	William James (Fiennes-Clinton) Howson b. 1980
Heir presumptive to his elder brother in the earldom of Lincoln

== See also ==
- Viscount Clare
- Earl of Clarence
- de Clare
