= Edward Fiennes-Clinton, 18th Earl of Lincoln =

Australian engineer and aristocrat (1913–2001)

The Right Honourable The Earl of Lincoln
- Lord Lincoln's coat of arms

Personal details
- Born: 23 February 1913 Melbourne, Australia
- Died: 7 July 2001 (aged 88)
- Spouse(s): Lelia Ruth Millen (m. 1940; died 1947) Linda Alice Creed (m. 1953)
- Children: Lady Patricia Elrick; Edward Fiennes-Clinton, Lord Fynes
- Parent(s): Edward Henry Fiennes-Clinton; Edith Annie Guest
- Education: Hale School

Edward Horace Fiennes-Clinton, 18th Earl of Lincoln (23 February 1913 – 7 July 2001) was an aristocratic Australian engineer, who succeeded to his family's earldom of Lincoln (cr. 1572) by primogeniture upon the death in 1988 of his 10th cousin, the last Duke of Newcastle.

== Life ==
Born in Melbourne, Australia, in 1913, he was the elder son of Edward Henry Fiennes-Clinton, a mate in the British Merchant Navy who emigrated to Australia in 1912 before serving with the 51st Battalion, Australian Imperial Force and being killed in action on 17 August 1916 during the First World War.

His mother, Edith Annie, daughter of Captain Horace Guest, brought him up before remarrying, in 1923, Robert Johnston Lynn, a cousin of Deputy Speaker of the Northern Ireland House of Commons, Sir Robert Lynn.

Educated at Hale School, an independent Anglican boarding school in Perth, Western Australia, Fiennes-Clinton then worked as a boilermaker, a welder's and machine-minder's assistant as well as a butcher at the Kalgoorlie Gold Mine.

== Story ==
Fiennes-Clinton learned of his succession to the earldom of Lincoln during a telephone call from a journalist with The Daily Telegraph newspaper in London, who began "Lord Lincoln, if I may be the first to address you so..." He said he had known he might one day inherit the title, but had forgotten about it. Upon the journalist commenting that he seemed unexcited, Lincoln replied: "young man, I have lived for seventy-five years and I have learned to take things as they come". He did however seem disappointed to hear there was little else to inherit apart from the peerage itself.

The Australian press was much more excited by the news, and three camera crews appeared outside the new peer's flat at Elanora Villas, Bunbury, Western Australia, before more reporters arrived by helicopter. Soon after inheriting the Earldom, the new Lord Lincoln travelled to England, where he was warmly received by (among others) leading citizens of the City of Lincoln. The story was soon fictionalized as a storyline in the Australian soap opera Neighbours.

He later wrote an autobiography called Memoirs of an Embryo Earl, published in 1992, and set about putting on record his formal right to the peerage with a view to taking his seat in the House of Lords. After being briefed on the workings of the Upper House by Lord Deedes, and having been received at the College of Arms, Lincoln stated his intention of joining the Conservative benches in the House of Lords. However, there were delays in the process of claiming his seat, which was defeated by the reforms of the upper house in the House of Lords Act 1999. Lincoln thereafter had no automatic right to sit in the Lords, as all but 92 hereditary peers had been removed. His grandson, the 19th Earl, was later courted by New Labour.

Lord Lincoln died in Western Australia on 7 July 2001.

== Family ==
In 1940, Fiennes-Clinton married Leila Ruth Fitzpatrick, née Millen, and they had two children, Patricia Ruth Fiennes-Clinton (born 1 February 1941, now Lady Patricia Elrick), and Edward Gordon Fiennes-Clinton (1943–99; styled Lord Fynes, by courtesy).

After his first wife died on 19 July 1947, Fiennes-Clinton on 3 December 1953 married Linda Alice, daughter of Rev Charles Creed and widow of James Anthony O'Brien; they had no children.

When his 10th cousin, the 10th and last Duke of Newcastle, died on Christmas Day 1988, Fiennes-Clinton succeeded to His Grace's subsidiary title of Earl of Lincoln. His ancestor, Sir Henry Clinton, of Kirkstead, Lincolnshire, was the 2nd Earl of Lincoln's elder son by his second marriage; the 2nd Earl's eldest son's descendants went on to become Dukes of Newcastle.

The family has served in public life since the 1st Baron Clinton was summoned to Parliament in 1299, and in the 18th century Thomas Pelham-Holles, 1st Duke of Newcastle twice-served as Prime Minister. The peerage of Baron Clinton, created by writ of summons, to which all descendants are in remainder, is now held by the Trefusis family.

Lincoln's grandson Robert Edward Fiennes-Clinton (born 19 June 1972) is the 19th and present earl. A fellow of the Zoological Society of London, he lives in Perth.

Family Tree of the Dukes of Newcastle, Earls of Lincoln (8th creation) and Earls of Clare

Baron Clinton (8th creation), 1298
John Clinton d. 1315; 1st Baron Clinton
Baron de Clynton, cr. 1330
John Clinton d. c. 1335; 2nd Baron Clinton	William de Clinton c. 1304 – 1354; Earl of Huntingdon, Baron de Clynton
Barony de Clynton extinct, 1354
John Clinton d. 1398; 3rd Baron Clinton
William Clinton dvp. 1383
William Clinton; 1378–1431; 4th Baron Clinton
Baron Ogle, 1461
John Clinton; 1410–1464; 5th Baron Clinton; Attainted, 1459; restored, 1461	Robert Ogle; 1406–1469; 1st Baron Ogle
John Clinton c. 1429 – 1488; 6th Baron Clinton	Owen (Ewyn) Ogle; 1440–1486; 2nd Baron Ogle
John Clinton c. 1470 – 1514; 7th Baron Clinton	Ralph Ogle; 1468–1513; 3rd Baron Ogle
Thomas Clinton; 1490–1517; 8th Baron Clinton	Robert Ogle; 1490–1530; 4th Baron Ogle
Earl of Lincoln (8th creation), 1572
Edward Clinton; 1512–1585; 1st Earl of Lincoln, 9th Baron Clinton	Robert Ogle; 1513/1527 – 1545; 5th Baron Ogle
Henry Clinton; 1539–1616; 2nd Earl of Lincoln, 10th Baron Clinton	Robert Ogle; 1529–1562; 6th Baron Ogle	Cuthbert Ogle c. 1540 – 1597; 7th Baron Ogle	William Cavendish c. 1505 – 1557	Bess of Hardwick c. 1527 – 1608
Earldom of Ogle abeyant, 1597
Earl of Ogle abeyance ended, 1628
Thomas Clinton; 1568–1619; 3rd Earl of Lincoln, 11th Baron Clinton	Edward Clinton; 1572–1623	Catherine Ogle; 1568/69/1570–1629; 8th Baroness Ogle	Charles Cavendish; 1553–1617	Frances Cavendish; 1548–1632	Henry Pierrepont; 1546–1615	see Earls & Dukes of Devonshire
Viscount Mansfield, 1620; Earl of Newcastle upon Tyne, 1628; Marquess of Newcastle-upon-Tyne, 1643; Duke of Newcastle-Upon-Tyne (1st creation) and Earl of Ogle, 1665	Earl of Clare (1st creation, 1624)
Henry Clinton later Fynes; 1587–1641	William Cavendish; 1592–1676; 1st Duke (and Marquess and Earl) of Newcastle-upon-Tyne and Viscount Mansfield, 9th Baron Ogle	Robert Pierrepont; 1584–1643; 1st Earl of Kingston-upon-Hull	John Holles; 1564–1637; 1st Earl of Clare
Baron Holles of Ifield in the County of Sussex
Theophilus Clinton; 1600–1667; 4th Earl of Lincoln, 12th Baron Clinton	Francis Clinton; 1610–1681	William Pierrepont c. 1607 – 1678	John Holles; 1595–1666; 2nd Earl of Clare	Denzil Holles; 1599–1680; 1st Baron Holles
Baronet of Winterbourne in the County of Dorset, 1660
Edward Clinton; 1624–1657	Francis Clinton; 1635–1693; 6th Earl of Lincoln	Norreys Fynes; 1617–1693	Henry Cavendish; 1630–1691; 2nd Duke (and Marquess and Earl) of Newcastle-upon-Tyne and Viscount Mansfield, 9th Baron Ogle	Frances Pierrepont; 1630–1695	Grace Pierrepont; 1633–1702	Gilbert Holles; 1633–1689; 3rd Earl of Clare	Francis Holles; 1627–1690; 2nd Baron Holles, 1st Baronet
Barony Ogle abeyant and all other titles extinct, 1691
Duke of Newcastle-Upon-Tyne (2nd creation) and Marquess of Clare (1st creation), 1694	Baron Pelham of Laughton, 1706; Baron Pelham of Stanmer, 1762
Edward Clinton; 1645–1692; 5th Earl of Lincoln, 13th Baron Clinton	Norreys Fynes; 1651–1736	Margaret Cavendish; 1661–1716	John Holles; 1662–1711; Duke of Newcastle-upon-Tyne and Marquess of Clare, 4th Earl of Clare	Grace Holles c. 1668 – 1700	Thomas Pelham; 1653–1712; Baron Pelham of Laughton and of Stanmer, 4th Pelham baronet, of Laughton	Denzil Holles; 1675–c. 1692; 3rd Baron Holles, 1st Baronet
All titles extinct, 1711	Both titles extinct, c. 1692
Earl of Clare (2nd creation, 1714; Duke of Newcastle-Upon-Tyne (3rd creation) and Marquess of Clare (2nd creation), 1715; Duke of Newcastle-Under-Lyne, 1756
Kendal Fynes; 1692–1740	Henry Clinton; 1684–1728; 7th Earl of Lincoln	Lucy Pelham; 1695–1736	Henry Pelham; 1694–1754	Thomas Pelham-Holles; 1693–1768; Duke of Newcastle-upon-Tyne, 1st Duke of Newcastle-under-Lyne, Marquess of Clare, Earl of Clare
All titles except Dukedom of Newcastle-under-Lyne extinct, 1768
Duke of Newcastle-Under-Lyne, 1756 (succeeded by special remainder, 1768)
Norreys Fynes; 1720–1764	George Clinton; 1718–1730; 8th Earl of Lincoln	Henry Pelham-Clinton; 1720–1794; 2nd Duke of Newcastle-under-Lyne, 9th Earl of Lincoln	Catherine Pelham; 1727–1760
Baron FitzGibbon, of Lower Connello in the County of Limerick (Ire), 1789; Viscount of Clare (Ire), 1793; Earl of Clare (Ire 3rd creation), 1795; Baron FitzGibbon, of Sidbury in the County of Devon (GB), 1799
John FitzGibbon; 1748–1802; 1st Earl of Clare	The FitzGibbon Earls of Clare are seemingly unrelated to the Holles family, the previous Earls of Clare.	Charles Fynes later Fynes Clinton; 1748–1827	Henry Pelham-Clinton; 1750–1778; Earl of Lincoln	Thomas Pelham-Clinton; 1752–1795; 3rd Duke of Newcastle-under-Lyne, 10th Earl of Lincoln
John FitzGibbon; 1792–1851; 2nd Earl of Clare	Richard Hobart FitzGibbon; 1793–1864; 3rd Earl of Clare	Clinton James Fynes Clinton later Fiennes-Clinton; 1792–1833	Henry Pelham-Clinton; 1785–1851; 4th Duke of Newcastle-under-Lyne, 11th Earl of Lincoln
Earldom of Clare extinct, 1864
Henry Fiennes-Clinton; 1826–1911	Henry Pelham-Clinton; 1811–1864; 5th Duke of Newcastle-under-Lyne, 12th Earl of Lincoln	Charles Pelham-Clinton; 1813–1894
Charles Edward Fiennes-Clinton; 1855–1888	Henry Pelham-Clinton; 1834–1879; 6th Duke of Newcastle-under-Lyne, 13th Earl of Lincoln	Charles Pelham-Clinton; 1857–1911
Edward Henry Fiennes-Clinton; 1886–1916	Henry Pelham-Clinton; 1864–1928; 7th Duke of Newcastle-under-Lyne, 14th Earl of Lincoln	Francis Pelham-Clinton-Hope; 1866–1941; 8th Duke of Newcastle-under-Lyne, 15th Earl of Lincoln	Guy Pelham-Clinton; 1894–1934
Edward Horace Fiennes-Clinton; 1913–2001; 18th Earl of Lincoln	Henry Pelham-Clinton-Hope; 1907–1988; 9th Duke of Newcastle-under-Lyne, 16th Earl of Lincoln	Edward Pelham-Clinton; 1920–1988; 10th Duke of Newcastle-under-Lyne, 17th Earl of Lincoln
Dukedom of Newcastle-upon-Tyne extinct, 1988
Edward Gordon Fiennes-Clinton; 1943–1999
Robert Edward Fiennes-Clinton b. 1972; 19th Earl of Lincoln	William James (Fiennes-Clinton) Howson b. 1980
Heir presumptive to his elder brother in the earldom of Lincoln

Peerage of England
Preceded by Edward Pelham-Clinton	Earl of Lincoln; 1989–2001	Succeeded by Robert Fiennes-Clinton
