= Edward Fiennes =

Edward Fiennes may refer to:

- Edward Clinton, 1st Earl of Lincoln, Edward Fiennes, Lord Clinton, husband of Bessie Blount, Henry VIII's long-term mistress
- Edward Fiennes-Clinton, 18th Earl of Lincoln (1913–2001), Australian engineer and landowner
