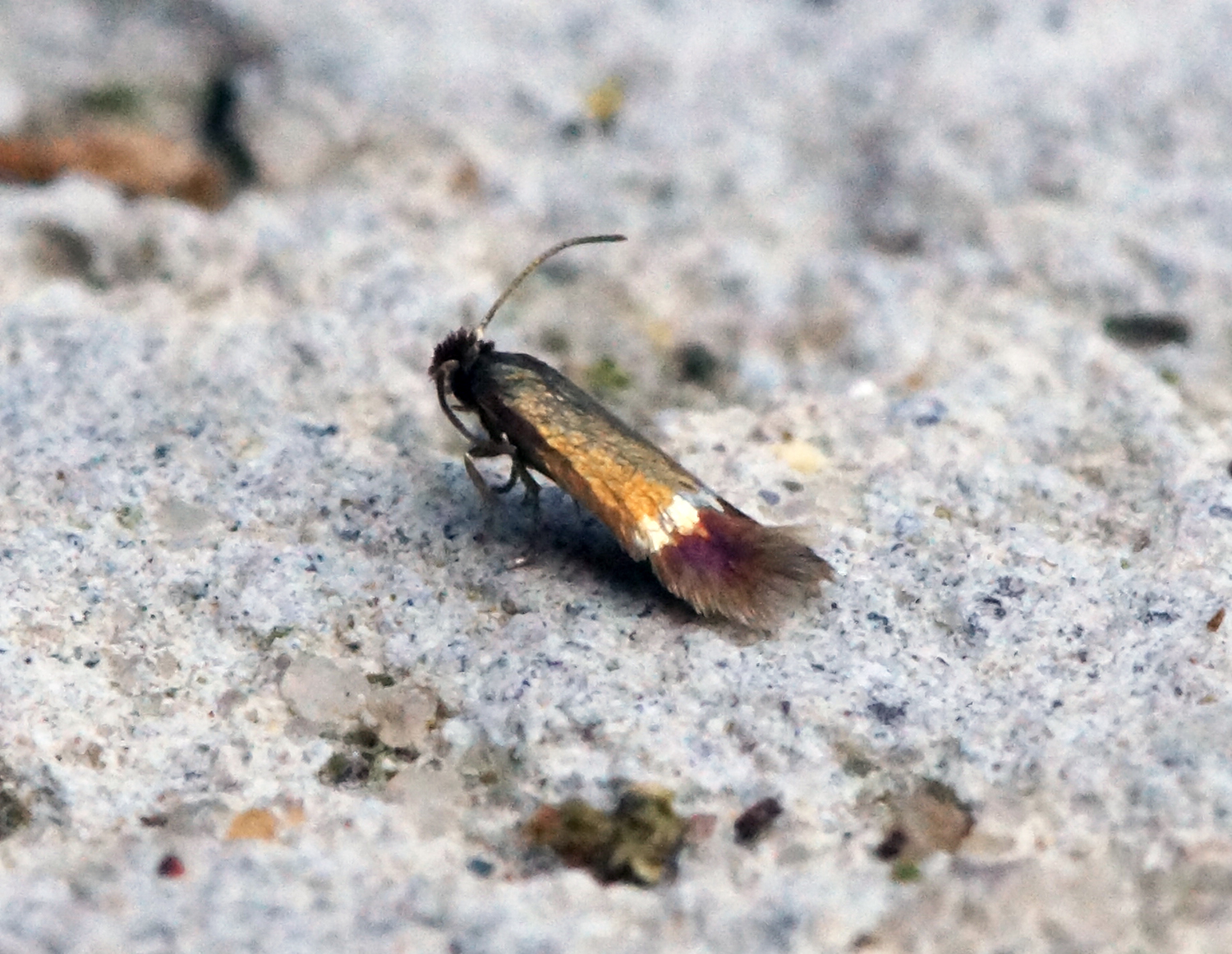

Scientific classification
- Kingdom: Animalia
- Phylum: Arthropoda
- Clade: Pancrustacea
- Class: Insecta
- Order: Lepidoptera
- Family: Nepticulidae
- Genus: Stigmella
- Species: S. hybnerella

Binomial name
- Stigmella hybnerella (Hübner, 1796)

Synonyms
- List: Tinea hybnerella Hübner, 1796; Caloptilia ampelipennella Hübner, 1825; Oecophora gratiosella Duponchel, 1843; Nepticula ignobilella Stainton, 1849; Nepticula latifasciella Herrich-Schaffer, 1855; Tinea posticella Hübner, 1828

= Stigmella hybnerella =

Species of moth

Stigmella hybnerella also known as the greenish thorn pigmy is a moth of the family Nepticulidae. It is found in all of Europe, in North Africa, the Near East, and the eastern part of the Palearctic realm. The larvae mine the leaves of trees and shrubs such as hawthorns and rowans.

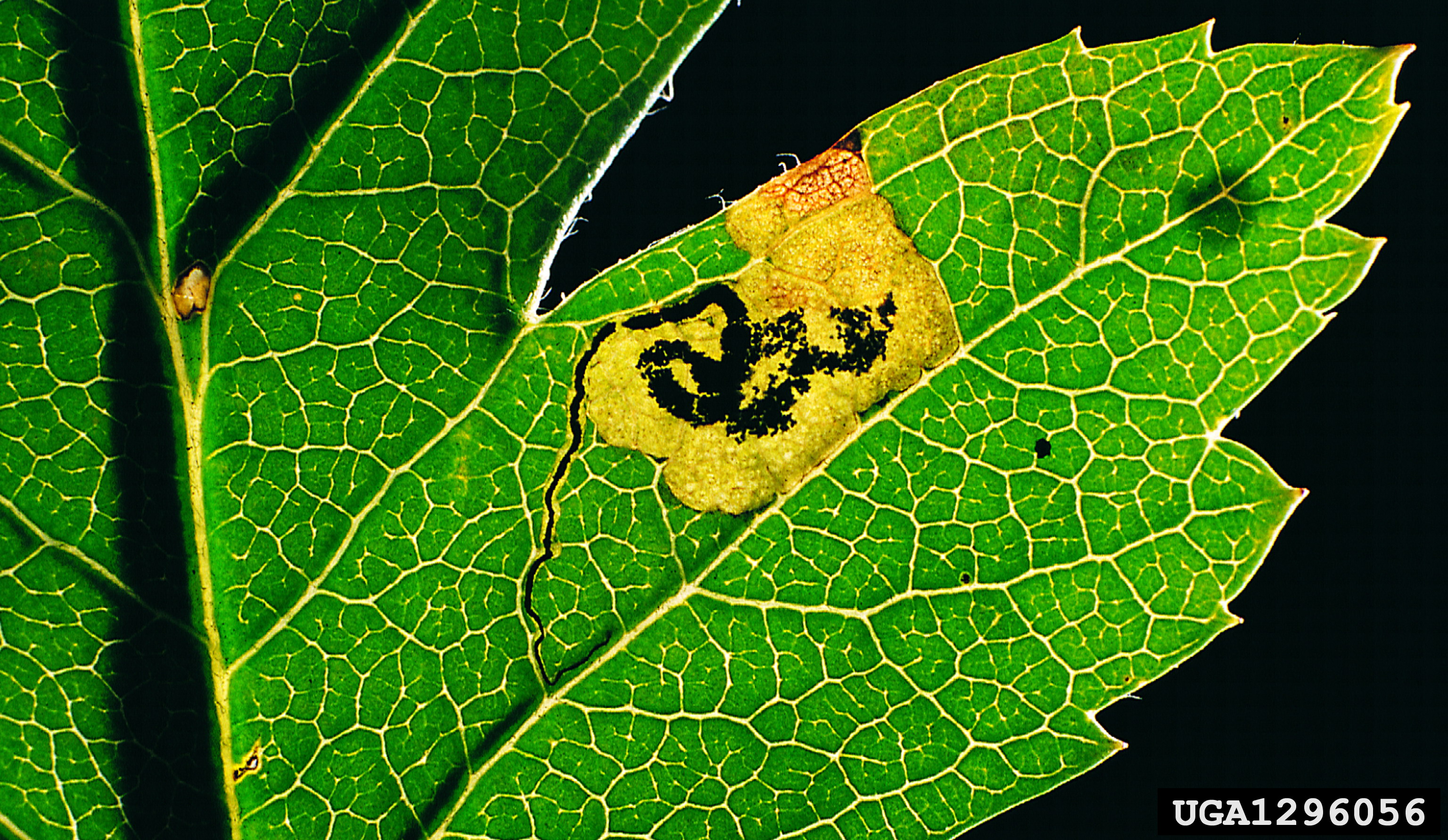
Stigmella hybnerella mine

== Description ==
Males of the species have a black head and golden-green coloured forewing with a white fascia distad to which the wing has purple hues . Females have black heads too, but sometimes orange. The wingspan is 4–5 millimetres (0.16–0.20 in).

Adults are on wing from April to May and again from July to August. There are two generations per year.

== Ecology ==
The larvae feed on snowy mespilus (Amelanchier ovalis), Cotoneasters, Midland hawthorn (Crataegus laevigata), common hawthorn (Crataegus monogyna), small-flowered black hawthorn (Crataegus pentagyna), common whitebeam (Sorbus aria) and wild service tree (Sorbus torminalis). They mine the leaves of their host plant.

== Etymology ==
Stigmella hybnerella was described by the German entomologist Jacob Hübner in 1796 from a type specimen found in Europe. The genus Stigmella – ″stigma″, refers to the conspicuous (or occasionally metallic) small dot or a brand fascia on the forewing of many of the Stigmella species, or possibly the small size of the moths. The species name hybnerella refers to Jacob Hübner, who seems to have named the moth after himself; although Maitland Emmet suggests it was probably proposed by another entomologist.
