= Duke of Newcastle =

Dukedom in the Peerage of Great Britain

Dukedom of Newcastle upon Tyne
- Arms of Pelham-Holles (third creation): Quarterly: 1st and 4th azure, three pelicans vulning themselves argent; 2nd and 3rd ermine, two piles in point sable
- Creation date: 1665 (first creation); 1694 (second creation); 1715 (third creation)
- Created by: Charles II (first creation); William III and Mary II (second creation); George I (third creation)
- Peerage: Peerage of England (first creation); Peerage of Great Britain (second and third creation)
- Remainder to: the 1st Duke's heirs male of the body lawfully begotten Special remainder for the third creation
- Extinction date: 1691 (first creation); 1711 (second creation); 1768 (third creation)

Dukedom of Newcastle-under-Lyne
- Arms of Pelham-Clinton: Quarterly: 1st and 4th argent, six cross crosslets, three, two and one, sable, on a chief azure two mullets pierced gules, Clinton; 2nd and 3rd, quarterly, 1st and 4th azure, three pelicans vulning themselves argent; and 2nd and 3rd gules, two pieces of belts with buckles erect in pale, the buckles upwards argent.
- Creation date: 1756
- Created by: George II
- Peerage: Peerage of Great Britain
- First holder: Thomas Pelham-Holles, 1st Duke of Newcastle upon Tyne
- Last holder: Edward Pelham-Clinton, 10th Duke of Newcastle-under-Lyne
- Remainder to: Special remainder
- Extinction date: 1988
- Seats: Clumber Park; Nottingham Castle

Duke of Newcastle upon Tyne was a title that was created three times, once in the Peerage of England and twice in the Peerage of Great Britain. The first grant of the title was made in 1665 to William Cavendish, 1st Marquess of Newcastle upon Tyne. He was a prominent Royalist commander during the Civil War.

The related title of Duke of Newcastle-under-Lyne [sic] was created once in the Peerage of Great Britain. It was conferred in 1756 on Thomas Pelham-Holles, 1st Duke of Newcastle upon Tyne (of the third creation), to provide a slightly more remote special remainder. The title became extinct in 1988, a year that saw the deaths of the distantly related ninth and tenth Dukes of Newcastle-under-Lyne.

== Creations ==
=== First creation (1665) ===
Arms of Cavendish, Sable three bucks' heads cabossed argent, a crescent for difference.

William Cavendish, 1st Duke of Newcastle, was a son of Charles Cavendish, himself the third son of Sir William Cavendish and his wife Bess of Hardwick. One of Charles Cavendish's elder brothers became the 1st Earl of Devonshire (see Duke of Devonshire for further history about this branch of the family).

The first duke, William Cavendish, was the son of Charles Cavendish and his second wife Catherine Ogle, 8th Baroness Ogle, daughter of Cuthbert Ogle, 7th Baron Ogle. William Cavendish became Viscount Mansfield in 1620, and in 1621, he was created Earl of Newcastle upon Tyne and Baron Cavendish of Bolsover. He succeeded his mother as ninth Baron Ogle in 1629, and he became Marquess of Newcastle upon Tyne in 1643. He was elevated to the dukedom of Newcastle upon Tyne in 1665. He also was granted the title of Earl of Ogle as a subsidiary title for the dukedom, to be used as a courtesy title by his heir apparent.

Upon his death in 1676, he was succeeded by his son, the second Duke, who was a politician. However, the second Duke's only son and heir apparent (Henry Cavendish, Earl of Ogle) predeceased him. Therefore, upon the second Duke's death in 1691, all of these many titles became extinct, except the barony of Ogle, which fell into abeyance between the second duke's four daughters (one of whom was Lady Elizabeth Cavendish).

=== Second creation (1694) ===
Arms of Holles, Ermine, two piles in point sable.

The second Duke's third daughter, Lady Margaret Cavendish (1661–1717), married John Holles, 4th Earl of Clare, who was incidentally her first cousin, her mother's sister's son. In 1694, the dukedom was revived when he was created Marquess of Clare and Duke of Newcastle upon Tyne. The Holles family descended from John Holles, who was created Baron Haughton, of Haughton in Nottinghamshire, in 1616 and Earl of Clare in 1624. His second son was a politician, Denzil Holles, 1st Baron Holles. Lord Clare was succeeded by his eldest son, the second Earl. He represented East Retford, Nottinghamshire, in the House of Commons and served as Lord Lieutenant of Nottinghamshire.

His son, the third Earl, was briefly MP for Nottinghamshire in 1660. He was succeeded by his son, the aforementioned fourth Earl of Clare, who married a daughter of the second Duke of Newcastle. In 1694, three years after the title became extinct, the Dukedom of Newcastle was revived and granted to the late Duke's son-in-law. The new duke of Newcastle and his wife, Lady Margaret, had only one daughter and no sons. Therefore, on his death in 1711, all his titles became extinct.

=== Third creation (1715) and Newcastle-under-Lyne (1756) ===
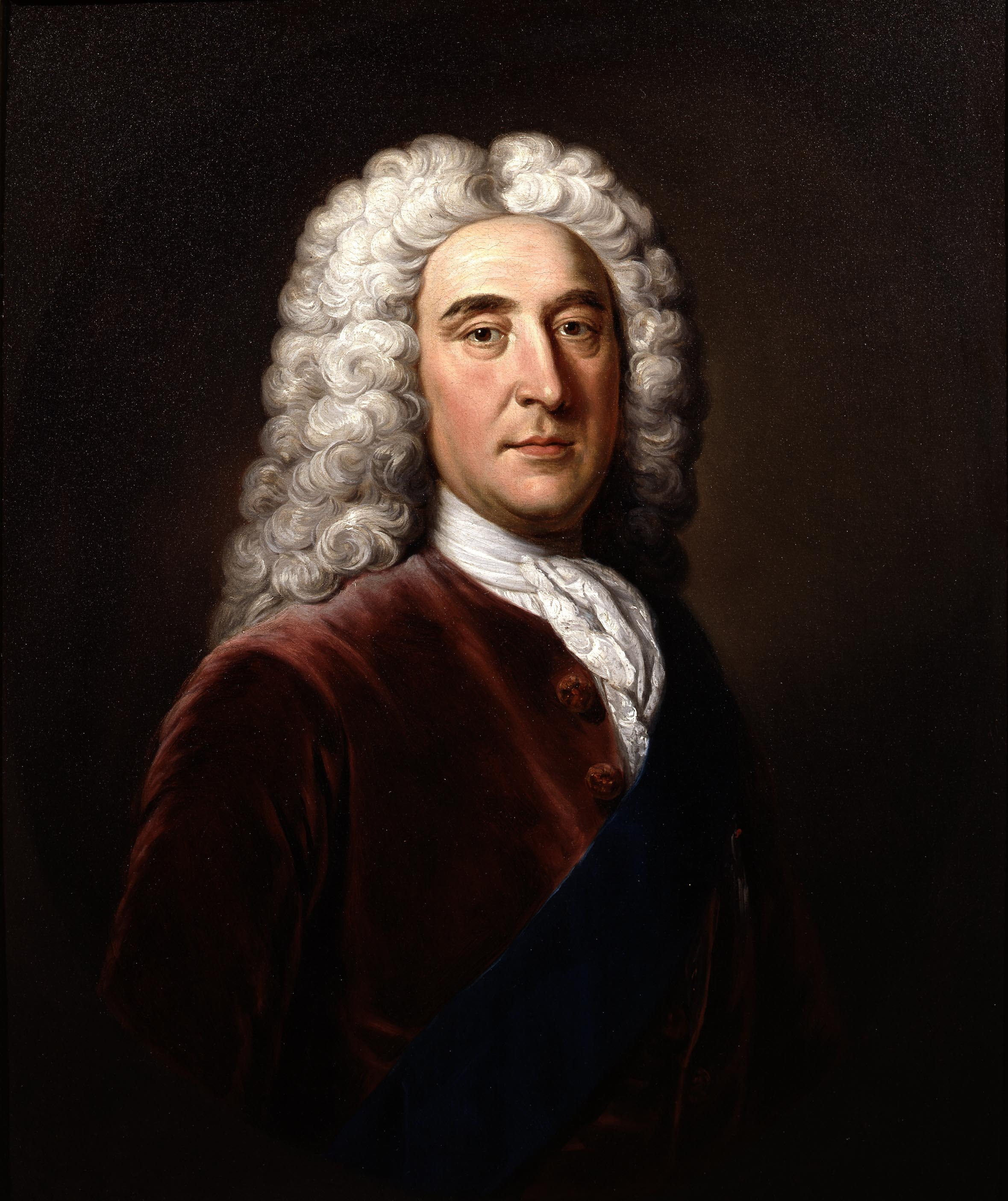
Thomas Pelham-Holles, 1st Duke of Newcastle and Prime Minister of Great Britain

The Duke's sister, Lady Grace Holles (died 1700), married Thomas Pelham, 1st Baron Pelham (see Earl of Chichester for earlier history of the Pelham family). Their elder son Thomas, upon his uncle's death in 1711, succeeded to the substantial Holles estates and assumed by Royal Licence the additional surname and arms of Holles. In 1714, the earldom of Clare was revived when he was created Viscount Haughton and Earl of Clare, with remainder to his younger brother Henry Pelham. The following year, the dukedom was revived when he was made Marquess of Clare and Duke of Newcastle upon Tyne, with like special remainder. These titles were in the Peerage of Great Britain.

In 1756, when his brother died without male issue and it was evident that the Duke would have no children, the Duke of Newcastle upon Tyne was additionally created Duke of Newcastle-under-Lyne [sic] with a different special remainder: to his nephew-by-marriage Henry Clinton, 9th Earl of Lincoln, who rapidly took on the additional surname Pelham. (For the history of this title from the 1768 inheritance upon the 1st Duke's death, see Earl of Lincoln.) The 1st Duke's other titles became extinct, except for the Pelham baronetcy (of Laughton) and the barony of Pelham (of Stanmer), which devolved to his first cousin once-removed, Thomas Pelham. (For the history of these titles, see Earl of Chichester.)

Extensive personal, transaction and estate papers of the dukes are held in the Portland (Welbeck) and Newcastle (Clumber) collections at the University of Nottingham's Department of Manuscripts and Special Collections.

== Dukes of Newcastle upon Tyne, first creation (1665) ==
also Marquess of Newcastle upon Tyne (1643), Earl of Newcastle upon Tyne (1628), Viscount Mansfield (1620) and Baron Ogle (1461)

- William Cavendish, 1st Duke of Newcastle (1592–1676), was a Cavalier commander in the English Civil War
- Henry Cavendish, 2nd Duke of Newcastle (1630–1691), only surviving son of the 1st Duke, died without surviving male issue
  - daughter married 4th Earl of Clare (see below)

== Earls of Clare (1624) ==
also Baron Haughton (1616)

- John Holles, 1st Earl of Clare (1564–1637), was Comptroller of the Household to Henry Frederick, Prince of Wales
- John Holles, 2nd Earl of Clare (1595–1666), eldest son of the 1st Earl
- Gilbert Holles, 3rd Earl of Clare (1633–1689), second (eldest adult) son of the 2nd Earl
- John Holles, 4th Earl of Clare (1662–1711), eldest son of the 3rd Earl; created Duke in 1694 (see section below)
  - married Lady Margaret Cavendish, daughter of Henry Cavendish, 2nd Duke of the first creation

== Dukes of Newcastle upon Tyne, second creation (1694) ==
also Earl of Clare (1624) and Baron Haughton (1616)

- John Holles, 1st Duke of Newcastle (1662–1711), died without male issue and his titles became extinct

== Dukes of Newcastle upon Tyne, third creation (1715) ==
also Earl of Clare (1714), Baron Pelham of Laughton (1706), Baron Pelham of Stanmer (1762) and Pelham Baronet, of Laughton (1611)

- Thomas Pelham-Holles, 1st Duke of Newcastle upon Tyne (1693–1768), Prime Minister twice, a nephew of John Holles (above). He died without male issue. At this point, his father's baronetcy and barony of 1706, his own earldom and the dukedom of 1715 became extinct.

== Dukes of Newcastle-under-Lyne (1756) ==
1st Duke: also Duke of Newcastle upon Tyne (1715), Earl of Clare (1714), Baron Pelham of Laughton (1706), Baron Pelham of Stanmer (1762) and Pelham Baronet, of Laughton (1611)

- Thomas Pelham-Holles, 1st Duke of Newcastle-under-Lyne (1693–1768), same as above, was granted this second Newcastle dukedom, with remainder to his nephew
- Henry Fiennes Pelham-Clinton, 9th Earl of Lincoln, 2nd Duke of Newcastle-under-Lyne (1720–1794), nephew of the 1st Duke
  - George Pelham-Clinton, Lord Clinton (1745–1752), eldest son of the 2nd Duke, died young
  - Henry Fiennes Pelham-Clinton, Earl of Lincoln (1750–1778), second son of the 2nd Duke
    - Henry Pelham-Clinton, Earl of Lincoln (1777–1779; styled Lord Clinton until 1778), only son of Lord Lincoln, died young
- Thomas Pelham-Clinton, 3rd Duke of Newcastle-under-Lyne (1752–1795), third son of the 2nd Duke
- Henry Pelham Fiennes Pelham-Clinton, 4th Duke of Newcastle-under-Lyne (1785–1851), eldest son of the 3rd Duke
- Henry Pelham Pelham-Clinton, 5th Duke of Newcastle-under-Lyne (1811–1864), eldest son of the 4th Duke
- Henry Pelham Alexander Pelham-Clinton, 6th Duke of Newcastle-under-Lyne (1834–1879), eldest son of the 5th Duke
- Henry Pelham Archibald Douglas Pelham-Clinton, 7th Duke of Newcastle-under-Lyne (1864–1928), eldest son of the 6th Duke, died without issue
- Henry Francis Hope Pelham-Clinton-Hope, 8th Duke of Newcastle-under-Lyne (1866–1941), second and youngest son of the 6th Duke
- Henry Edward Hugh Pelham-Clinton-Hope, 9th Duke of Newcastle-under-Lyne (1907–1988), only son of the 8th Duke, died without male issue
- Edward Charles Pelham-Clinton, 10th Duke of Newcastle-under-Lyne (1920–1988), great-grandson of Lord Charles Pelham Pelham-Clinton, second son of the 4th Duke. On his death in 1988, the dukedom ceased to have patrilineal heirs and thus became extinct.

see also Earl of Lincoln

== Estates and residences ==
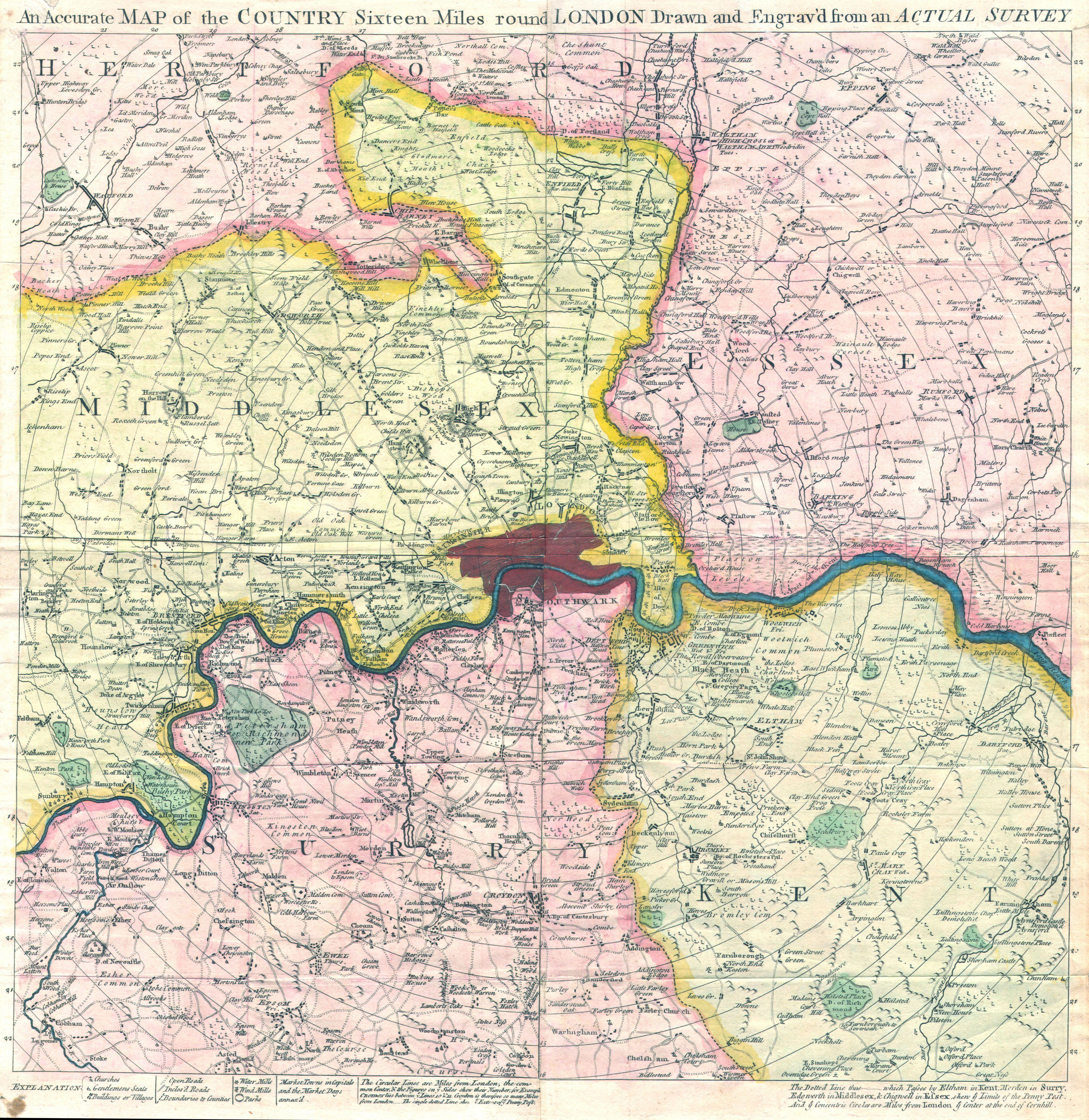

Gentleman's Magazine:
Map of London & Environs, 1764

=== Country seats ===
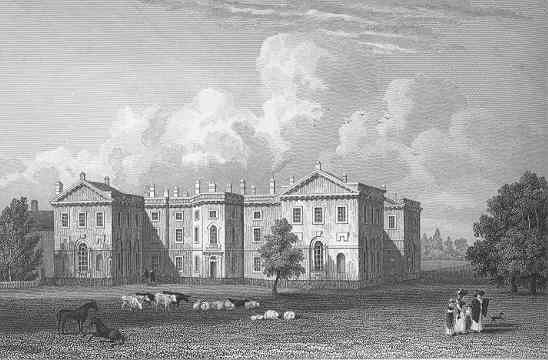
Clumber Park

- Clumber Park, also known as Clumber Park Lodge, spanning Clumber and Worksop, Nottinghamshire, from 1709 until 1938, when the house was demolished.
- Boyton Manor, Wiltshire, bought in the 1950s and sold about 1980.
- Newcastle House, Lincoln's Inn Fields, London, briefly in the 18th century.
- Claremont, Esher, north Surrey, from 1714 to 1768.
- A house on part of the site of the dismantled Nottingham Castle, which was on the rejection of "the Reform Bill" by the Lords set on fire by a mob, at which time it had for many years been divided into separate dwellings.
- The 6th Duke inherited the Hope mansion of Deepdene House, Dorking, Surrey, which was sold by the 8th Duke.

=== Estates ===
In the 1883 edition of John Bateman's The Great Landowners of Great Britain and Ireland, Henry Pelham-Clinton, 7th Duke of Newcastle's estates were recorded as spanning 35,547 acres across England, including 34,467 acres in Nottinghamshire, 827 acres in Derbyshire, 237 acres in the West Riding of Yorkshire, and 16 acres in Lincolnshire, which produced a combined annual income of £74,547.

==== London residences ====
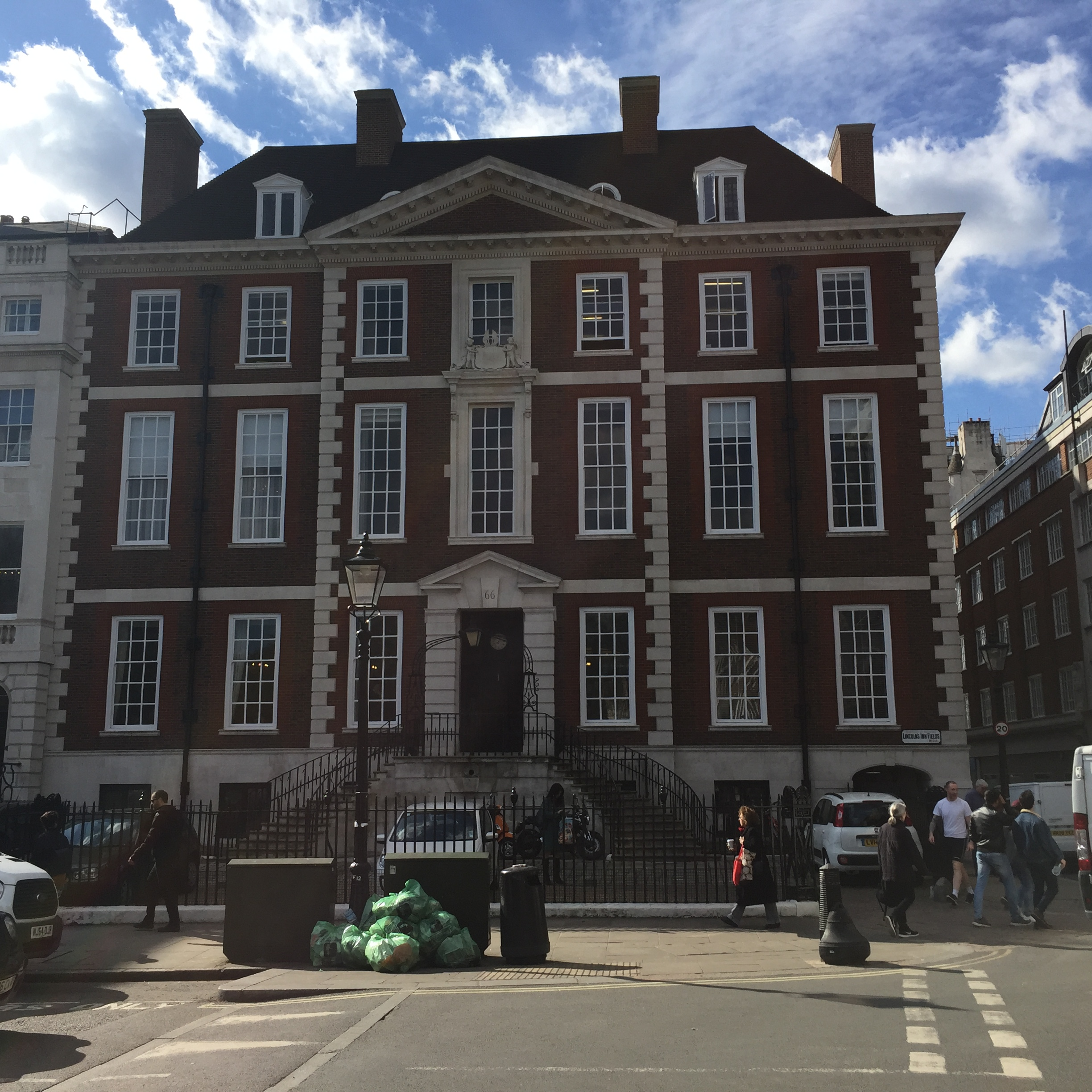
Newcastle House, March 2017

In 1705 John Holles, 1st Duke of Newcastle purchased Powis House in Lincoln's Inn Fields for £7,500; the house was subsequently renamed Newcastle House, and the building has since retained this name. Following the Duke's death in 1711 the house was inherited by his nephew, Thomas Pelham-Holles, who was also made Duke of Newcastle in 1715. Following the Duke's death in 1768 his widow Harriet Pelham-Holles, Duchess of Newcastle continued to live at Newcastle House until 1771.

In 1801 Anna Maria, Dowager Duchess of Newcastle (widow of Thomas Pelham-Clinton, 3rd Duke of Newcastle) leased No. 39 Charles Street, Mayfair; her son Henry Pelham-Clinton, 4th Duke of Newcastle came of age in 1806 and continued to occupy the house, where his son Henry Pelham-Clinton, 5th Duke of Newcastle was born in 1811.

The London residence of Henry Pelham-Clinton, 4th Duke of Newcastle and his successor Henry Pelham-Clinton, 5th Duke of Newcastle was No. 20 Portman Square from c. 1820 until c. 1863. In late 1863 the 5th Duke commissioned Sir Samuel Morton Peto to construct a large new house on the eastern end of Carlton House Terrace, which was later given the Number 18. Following the death of the 5th Duke in 1864, his son Henry Pelham-Clinton, 6th Duke of Newcastle inherited a life interest in the lease of No. 18 Carlton House Terrace; this was later claimed by his father's trustees when the 6th Duke was declared to be a bankrupt in 1871. At the time of the 6th Duke's death in 1879 his London residence was at the Park Hotel, No. 10 Park Place, St James's Street.

He was succeeded by his fourteen-year-old son Henry Pelham-Clinton, 7th Duke of Newcastle; his wife remarried just over a year after his death to Thomas Hohler, and the widowed Duchess, her new husband, and her young children lived at No. 30 Wilton Crescent, which continued to be the Dowager Duchess' London residence until c. 1885.

In November 1883 the young 7th Duke took a 12-month lease of No. 14 Westbourne Street, Paddington. By July 1888 he had rented an apartment in Cliveden Chambers, No. 104 Mount Street, Mayfair; following his marriage to Kathleen Candy in 1889, the Duke and Duchess initially used the Mount Street apartment as their London home until c. 1890. In early 1891 the 7th Duke purchased the lease of No. 11 Hill Street, Mayfair. This continued to be their London residence until Duke sold the leasehold of 11 Hill Street to Charles Ansell for £45,000 in early 1902. In January 1909 he rented an apartment in Berkeley House, Hay Hill in Mayfair, which remained as his town residence until his death in May 1928.

=== Wales ===
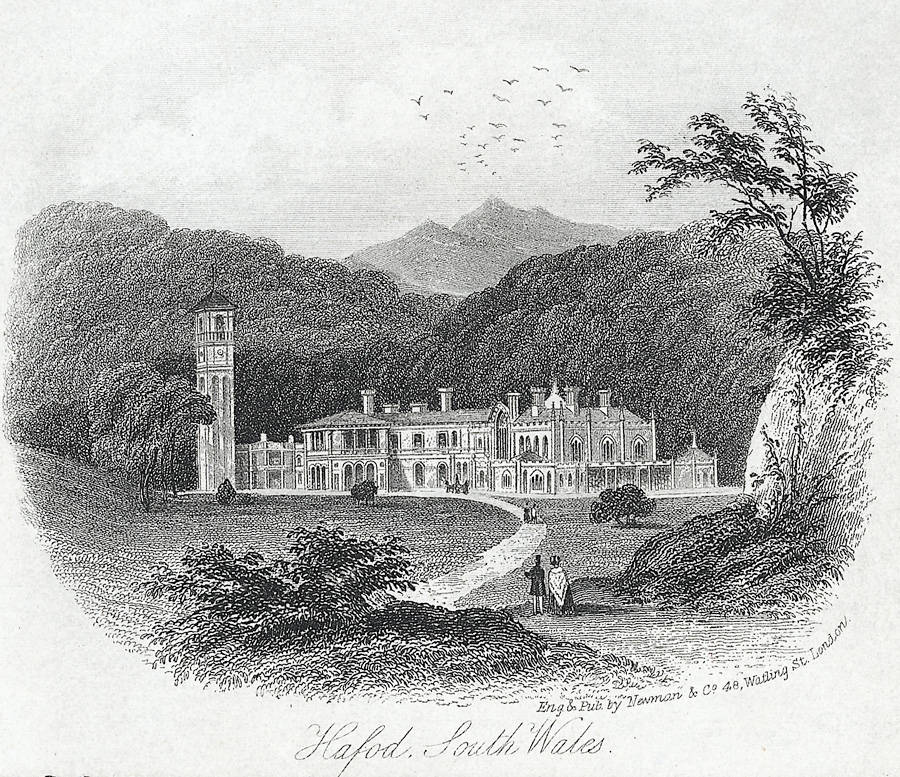
Hafod Uchtryd

- One duke bought the retreat of Cwm Elain, Dyfryn-Elain, Cwm-Toyddwr, Radnorshire, from Sir Robert Peel. It had been sold off by 1849.
- The heirs of Thomas Johnes (died 1816) sold Hafod Uchtryd, in Cardiganshire, together with its estate on the Ystwith, to the 4th Duke. The process of sale took from 1831 until 1833, and the price was £70,000. The Duke spent £20,000 on the property, including adding the Havod Arms Inn, four miles from the house in Llanfihangel y Creuddyn. In 1846, he sold the estate for £95,000 to Henry Hoghton.

=== Ireland ===
- The 6th Duke inherited the Hope mansion of Castleblayney, County Monaghan, Ireland; this was sold by the 8th Duke.

== Family tree ==
Family Tree of the Dukes of Newcastle, Earls of Lincoln (8th creation) and Earls of Clare

Baron Clinton (8th creation), 1298
John Clinton d. 1315; 1st Baron Clinton
Baron de Clynton, cr. 1330
John Clinton d. c. 1335; 2nd Baron Clinton	William de Clinton c. 1304 – 1354; Earl of Huntingdon, Baron de Clynton
Barony de Clynton extinct, 1354
John Clinton d. 1398; 3rd Baron Clinton
William Clinton dvp. 1383
William Clinton; 1378–1431; 4th Baron Clinton
Baron Ogle, 1461
John Clinton; 1410–1464; 5th Baron Clinton; Attainted, 1459; restored, 1461	Robert Ogle; 1406–1469; 1st Baron Ogle
John Clinton c. 1429 – 1488; 6th Baron Clinton	Owen (Ewyn) Ogle; 1440–1486; 2nd Baron Ogle
John Clinton c. 1470 – 1514; 7th Baron Clinton	Ralph Ogle; 1468–1513; 3rd Baron Ogle
Thomas Clinton; 1490–1517; 8th Baron Clinton	Robert Ogle; 1490–1530; 4th Baron Ogle
Earl of Lincoln (8th creation), 1572
Edward Clinton; 1512–1585; 1st Earl of Lincoln, 9th Baron Clinton	Robert Ogle; 1513/1527 – 1545; 5th Baron Ogle
Henry Clinton; 1539–1616; 2nd Earl of Lincoln, 10th Baron Clinton	Robert Ogle; 1529–1562; 6th Baron Ogle	Cuthbert Ogle c. 1540 – 1597; 7th Baron Ogle	William Cavendish c. 1505 – 1557	Bess of Hardwick c. 1527 – 1608
Earldom of Ogle abeyant, 1597
Earl of Ogle abeyance ended, 1628
Thomas Clinton; 1568–1619; 3rd Earl of Lincoln, 11th Baron Clinton	Edward Clinton; 1572–1623	Catherine Ogle; 1568/69/1570–1629; 8th Baroness Ogle	Charles Cavendish; 1553–1617	Frances Cavendish; 1548–1632	Henry Pierrepont; 1546–1615	see Earls & Dukes of Devonshire
Viscount Mansfield, 1620; Earl of Newcastle upon Tyne, 1628; Marquess of Newcastle-upon-Tyne, 1643; Duke of Newcastle-Upon-Tyne (1st creation) and Earl of Ogle, 1665	Earl of Clare (1st creation, 1624)
Henry Clinton later Fynes; 1587–1641	William Cavendish; 1592–1676; 1st Duke (and Marquess and Earl) of Newcastle-upon-Tyne and Viscount Mansfield, 9th Baron Ogle	Robert Pierrepont; 1584–1643; 1st Earl of Kingston-upon-Hull	John Holles; 1564–1637; 1st Earl of Clare
Baron Holles of Ifield in the County of Sussex
Theophilus Clinton; 1600–1667; 4th Earl of Lincoln, 12th Baron Clinton	Francis Clinton; 1610–1681	William Pierrepont c. 1607 – 1678	John Holles; 1595–1666; 2nd Earl of Clare	Denzil Holles; 1599–1680; 1st Baron Holles
Baronet of Winterbourne in the County of Dorset, 1660
Edward Clinton; 1624–1657	Francis Clinton; 1635–1693; 6th Earl of Lincoln	Norreys Fynes; 1617–1693	Henry Cavendish; 1630–1691; 2nd Duke (and Marquess and Earl) of Newcastle-upon-Tyne and Viscount Mansfield, 9th Baron Ogle	Frances Pierrepont; 1630–1695	Grace Pierrepont; 1633–1702	Gilbert Holles; 1633–1689; 3rd Earl of Clare	Francis Holles; 1627–1690; 2nd Baron Holles, 1st Baronet
Barony Ogle abeyant and all other titles extinct, 1691
Duke of Newcastle-Upon-Tyne (2nd creation) and Marquess of Clare (1st creation), 1694	Baron Pelham of Laughton, 1706; Baron Pelham of Stanmer, 1762
Edward Clinton; 1645–1692; 5th Earl of Lincoln, 13th Baron Clinton	Norreys Fynes; 1651–1736	Margaret Cavendish; 1661–1716	John Holles; 1662–1711; Duke of Newcastle-upon-Tyne and Marquess of Clare, 4th Earl of Clare	Grace Holles c. 1668 – 1700	Thomas Pelham; 1653–1712; Baron Pelham of Laughton and of Stanmer, 4th Pelham baronet, of Laughton	Denzil Holles; 1675–c. 1692; 3rd Baron Holles, 1st Baronet
All titles extinct, 1711	Both titles extinct, c. 1692
Earl of Clare (2nd creation, 1714; Duke of Newcastle-Upon-Tyne (3rd creation) and Marquess of Clare (2nd creation), 1715; Duke of Newcastle-Under-Lyne, 1756
Kendal Fynes; 1692–1740	Henry Clinton; 1684–1728; 7th Earl of Lincoln	Lucy Pelham; 1695–1736	Henry Pelham; 1694–1754	Thomas Pelham-Holles; 1693–1768; Duke of Newcastle-upon-Tyne, 1st Duke of Newcastle-under-Lyne, Marquess of Clare, Earl of Clare
All titles except Dukedom of Newcastle-under-Lyne extinct, 1768
Duke of Newcastle-Under-Lyne, 1756 (succeeded by special remainder, 1768)
Norreys Fynes; 1720–1764	George Clinton; 1718–1730; 8th Earl of Lincoln	Henry Pelham-Clinton; 1720–1794; 2nd Duke of Newcastle-under-Lyne, 9th Earl of Lincoln	Catherine Pelham; 1727–1760
Baron FitzGibbon, of Lower Connello in the County of Limerick (Ire), 1789; Viscount of Clare (Ire), 1793; Earl of Clare (Ire 3rd creation), 1795; Baron FitzGibbon, of Sidbury in the County of Devon (GB), 1799
John FitzGibbon; 1748–1802; 1st Earl of Clare	The FitzGibbon Earls of Clare are seemingly unrelated to the Holles family, the previous Earls of Clare.	Charles Fynes later Fynes Clinton; 1748–1827	Henry Pelham-Clinton; 1750–1778; Earl of Lincoln	Thomas Pelham-Clinton; 1752–1795; 3rd Duke of Newcastle-under-Lyne, 10th Earl of Lincoln
John FitzGibbon; 1792–1851; 2nd Earl of Clare	Richard Hobart FitzGibbon; 1793–1864; 3rd Earl of Clare	Clinton James Fynes Clinton later Fiennes-Clinton; 1792–1833	Henry Pelham-Clinton; 1785–1851; 4th Duke of Newcastle-under-Lyne, 11th Earl of Lincoln
Earldom of Clare extinct, 1864
Henry Fiennes-Clinton; 1826–1911	Henry Pelham-Clinton; 1811–1864; 5th Duke of Newcastle-under-Lyne, 12th Earl of Lincoln	Charles Pelham-Clinton; 1813–1894
Charles Edward Fiennes-Clinton; 1855–1888	Henry Pelham-Clinton; 1834–1879; 6th Duke of Newcastle-under-Lyne, 13th Earl of Lincoln	Charles Pelham-Clinton; 1857–1911
Edward Henry Fiennes-Clinton; 1886–1916	Henry Pelham-Clinton; 1864–1928; 7th Duke of Newcastle-under-Lyne, 14th Earl of Lincoln	Francis Pelham-Clinton-Hope; 1866–1941; 8th Duke of Newcastle-under-Lyne, 15th Earl of Lincoln	Guy Pelham-Clinton; 1894–1934
Edward Horace Fiennes-Clinton; 1913–2001; 18th Earl of Lincoln	Henry Pelham-Clinton-Hope; 1907–1988; 9th Duke of Newcastle-under-Lyne, 16th Earl of Lincoln	Edward Pelham-Clinton; 1920–1988; 10th Duke of Newcastle-under-Lyne, 17th Earl of Lincoln
Dukedom of Newcastle-upon-Tyne extinct, 1988
Edward Gordon Fiennes-Clinton; 1943–1999
Robert Edward Fiennes-Clinton b. 1972; 19th Earl of Lincoln	William James (Fiennes-Clinton) Howson b. 1980
Heir presumptive to his elder brother in the earldom of Lincoln

=== Other notable descendants (last creation) ===
- Camilla Long is a grand-daughter of Marjorie Pelham-Clinton (1910–2005), a first cousin of the 10th Duke and a great-granddaughter of the 4th Duke.

== See also ==
- Duke of Devonshire
- Earl of Portland, which inherited most of the dukedom's estates from 2nd Duke of Portland
- Cavendish-Bentinck
- Duchess of Newcastle (disambiguation)
- Earl of Chichester
- Earl of Lincoln
- Earl of Newcastle
- Baron Clinton
- Baron Holles
- Baron Ogle
