= The Moths and Butterflies of Great Britain and Ireland =

British nature reference texts

The Moths and Butterflies of Great Britain and Ireland volume 1

The Moths and Butterflies of Great Britain and Ireland (abbreviated to MBGBI or MOGBI) is a multi-volume reference work on the Lepidoptera of the British Isles.

The original publisher of this series was Curwen Books who published volumes 1 and 9. In 1983 Harley Books took over publishing the series. The earlier volumes were reprinted. From 1 April 2008 following the retirement of Annette and Basil Harley, Apollo Books acquired Harley Books. It was decided, that Apollo Books would continue and conclude the series with volume 5 on Tortricidae, volume 6 on Pyralidae and Pterophoridae, and volume 8 on Geometridae. At the same time they took over the remaining stock of the previous seven volumes of the series. From 1 January 2013, Apollo Books announced that all Harley Books titles and the majority of the Apollo Books titles, have been taken over by the Dutch publisher Brill Publishers. The change was necessary to ensure that the book series can continue to be published in the years ahead

Eleven volumes were originally planned in total. So far, volumes 1, 2, 3, 4, 5, 7, 9 and 10 have been published. Volumes 4, 5 and 7 were each split into two parts due to their size. Volume 5, the most recent, was published in September 2014.

Each volume has text, distribution maps, and illustrations of the moths it covers. When the series is complete, this will be the first time that all species of Lepidoptera recorded in Britain have been illustrated in a single reference work.

Volume 7 part 2 contains a 241-page Life History chart covering all British species.

== The series volume by volume ==
=== Volume 1 (Micropterigidae to Heliozelidae) ===
- Editor: John Heath
- Associate Editors: A. Maitland Emmet, D. S. Fletcher, E. C. Pelham-Clinton and W. G. Tremewan
- Artists: Brian Hargreaves and Maureen Lane
- Hardback: ISBN 0-632-00331-6 (Blackwell Scientific Publications and Curwen Books) ISBN 0-946589-03-8 (Harley Books)
- Paperback: ISBN 0-946589-15-1
- Published in: 1976 by Blackwell Scientific Publications and Curwen Books, and reprinted in 1983 by Harley Books
- Introductory chapters: 1) Morphology, 2) Parasites 3) Diseases 4) Pest Species 5) Habitats 6) Conservation 7) Techniques
- Covers Micropterigidae, Eriocraniidae, Hepialidae, Nepticulidae, Opostegidae, Tischeriidae, Incurvariidae and Heliozelidae

=== Volume 2 (Cossidae to Heliodinidae) ===
- Editor: John Heath and A. Maitland Emmet
- Associate Editors: D. S. Fletcher, E. C. Pelham-Clinton, B. Skinner and W. G. Tremewan
- Artists: Brian Hargreaves, Timothy Freed and Brenda Jarman
- Hardback: ISBN 0-946589-02-X
- Paperback: ISBN 0-946589-19-4
- Published in: 1985 by Harley Books
- Introductory chapter: British Aposematic Lepidoptera by Miriam Rothschild
- Covers the fifteen families within the super-families Cossoidea, Zygaenoidea, Tineoidea and the first part of the Yponomeutoidea.

=== Volume 3 (Yponomeutidae to Elachistidae) ===
- Editor: A. Maitland Emmet
- Associate Editors: D. S. Fletcher, B. H. Harley, J. R. Langmaid, G. S. Robinson, B. Skinner, P. A. Sokoloff and W. G. Tremewan
- Artists: Richard Lewington and Timothy Freed
- Hardback: ISBN 0-946589-43-7
- Paperback: ISBN 0-946589-56-9
- Published in: 1996 by Harley Books
- Introductory chapter: Invasions of Lepidoptera into the British Isles by D. J. L. Agassiz
- Covers Yponomeutidae, Epermeniidae, Schreckensteiniidae, Coleophoridae and Elachistidae.

=== Volume 4 Part 1 (Oecophoridae to Scythrididae, excluding Gelechiidae) ===
- Editor: A. Maitland Emmet and John R. Langmaid
- Associate Editors: K. P. Bland, D. S. Fletcher, B. H. Harley, G. S. Robinson, B. Skinner and W. G. Tremewan
- Artists: Richard Lewington and Michael J. Roberts
- Hardback: ISBN 0-946589-66-6
- Paperback: ISBN 0-946589-72-0
- Published in: 2002 by Harley Books
- Publisher's Foreword: A Tribute to Maitland Emmet
- Introductory chapter: The Ecology and Evolution of Lepidopteran Defences against Bats by J. Rydell and M. R. Young
- Covers Batrachedridae, Oecophoridae, Ethmiidae, Autostichidae, Blastobasidae, Agonoxenidae, Momphidae, Cosmopterigidae and Scythrididae

=== Volume 4 Part 2 (Gelechiidae) ===
- Editor: A. Maitland Emmet and John R. Langmaid
- Associate Editors: K. P. Bland, D. S. Fletcher, B. H. Harley, G. S. Robinson, B. Skinner and W. G. Tremewan
- Artists: Richard Lewington and Michael J. Roberts
- Hardback: ISBN 0-946589-67-4
- Paperback: ISBN 0-946589-73-9
- Published in: 2002 by Harley Books
- No introductory chapter
- Covers Gelechiidae

=== Volume 5 Part 1 (Tortricidae Tortricinae & Chlidanotinae) ===
- Editor: Keith P. Bland
- Authors: E.F. Hancock(†) and K.P. Bland
- Genitalia drawings: J. Razowski
- Hardback: ISBN 978-90-04-25211-0
- e-book: ISBN 978-90-04-26106-8
- Published: in 2014 by Brill
- No introductory chapter
- Covers Tortricidae: subfamilies Tortricinae & Chlidanotinae

=== Volume 5 Part 2 (Tortricidae Olethreutinae) ===
- Editor: Keith P. Bland
- Authors: E.F. Hancock(†) and K.P. Bland
- Genitalia drawings: J. Razowski
- Hardback: ISBN 978-90-04-25212-7
- e-book: ISBN 978-90-04-26436-6
- Published in 2014 by Brill
- No introductory chapter
- Covers Tortricidae: subfamily Olethreutinae

=== Volume 6 (Pyralidae and Pterophoridae) ===
Volume 6 has not yet been published

=== Volume 7 Part 1 (Hesperiidae to Nymphalidae) ===
This volume was also titled The Butterflies of Britain and Ireland

- Editor: A. Maitland Emmet and John Heath
- Associate Editors: D. S. Fletcher, E. C. Pelham-Clinton, G. S. Robinson, B. Skinner and W. G. Tremewan
- Artists: Richard Lewington and Timothy Freed
- Hardback: ISBN 978-0-946589-25-8
- Paperback: ISBN 0-946589-37-2
- Published in: 1990 by Harley Books
- Introductory chapters: 1) The vernacular names and early history of British butterflies by A. M. Emmet; 2) Re-establishment of insect populations, with special reference to butterflies by M. G. Morris and J. A. Thomas
- Covers Hesperiidae, Papilionidae, Pieridae, Lycaenidae, Nymphalidae

=== Volume 7 Part 2 (Lasiocampidae to Thyatiridae) ===
- Editor: A. Maitland Emmet and John Heath
- Associate Editors: D. S. Fletcher, B. H. Harley, E. C. Pelham-Clinton, G. S. Robinson, B. Skinner and W. G. Tremewan
- Artists: Richard Lewington and Timothy Freed
- Hardback: ISBN 978-0-946589-26-5
- Paperback: ISBN 0-946589-42-9
- Published in: 1992 by Harley Books
- Introductory chapters: 1) Classification of the Lepidoptera by M. J. Scoble; 2) Resting posture in the Lepidoptera by M. W. F. Tweedie and A. M. Emmet; 3) Chart showing the Life History and Habits of the British Lepidoptera by A. M. Emmet

=== Volume 8 (Geometridae) ===
Volume 8 has not yet been published

=== Volume 9 (Sphingidae to Noctuidae - Noctuinae and Hadeninae) ===
- Editor: John Heath and A. Maitland Emmet
- Associate Editors: D. S. Fletcher, E. C. Pelham-Clinton and W. G. Tremewan
- Artists: Brian Hargreaves and Maureen Lane
- Hardback: ISBN 0-902068-07-5 (Curwen Books) ISBN 0-946589-04-6 (Harley Books)
- Paperback: ISBN 0-946589-16-X
- Published in: 1979 by Curwen Books and reprinted in 1983 by Harley Books
- Introductory chapter: Eversible Structures by M. C. Birch
- Covers Sphingidae, Notodontidae, Thaumetopoeidae, Lymantriidae, Arctiidae, Ctenuchidae, Nolidae and Noctuidae (subfamilies Noctuinae and Hadeninae).

=== Volume 10 (Noctuidae - Cuculliinae to Hypeninae, and Agaristidae) ===
- Editor: John Heath and A. Maitland Emmet
- Associate Editors: D. S. Fletcher, E. C. Pelham-Clinton and W. G. Tremewan
- Artists: Brian Hargreaves, Brenda Jarman and Maureen Lane
- Hardback: ISBN 0-946589-01-1
- Paperback: ISBN 0-946589-17-8
- Published in: 1983 by Harley Books
- Introductory chapter: The Incidence of Migrant Lepidoptera in the British Isles by R. F. Bretherton
- Covers Cuculliinae, Acronictinae, Amphipyrinae, Heliothinae, Acontiinae, Chloephorinae, Sarrothripinae, Pantheinae, Plusiinae, Catocalinae, Ophiderinae, Hypeninae and Agaristidae

=== Volume 11 (Larvae) ===
Volume 11 has not yet been published

== See also ==
- Differences between butterflies and moths
- Lepidoptera
- Taxonomy of the Lepidoptera
