= Henry Fynes Clinton =

British politician (1781–1852)

Henry Fynes Clinton FSA (14 January 1781 – 24 October 1852) was a 19th-century English classical scholar and chronologist, who sat as a Tory Member of Parliament.

== Family background ==
He was born at Gamston, Nottinghamshire, the eldest son of the Revd Dr Charles Fynes (later Fynes Clinton), Prebendary of Westminster and Perpetual Curate of St. Margaret's, Westminster.

Of aristocratic descent, his family bore the surname of Fynes for five generations until his father, the Revd Preb. Charles Fynes, resumed the ancient noble name of Clinton in 1821. His younger brother Clinton Fynes Clinton MP is ancestor of the present Earl of Lincoln.

== Life ==
Educated at Southwell Grammar School and Westminster School, Fynes Clinton went up to Christ Church, Oxford, where he read classical literature and history (MA 1805). He then entered Lincoln's Inn in 1808 to study law.

From 1806 to 1826 Fynes Clinton served as Member of Parliament (MP) for Aldborough.

Fynes Clinton married twice, firstly in 1809 to Harriet (died 1810), daughter and coheiress of the Revd Prebendary Dr Charles Wylde, Rector of St Nicholas' Nottingham; and secondly in 1812 to Katherine (died 1871), daughter of the Rt Revd Dr Henry Majendie, Bishop of Bangor. Having 2 sons who predeceased him and 9 daughters, of whom Isabella Fynes-Clinton (died 1848) married Thomas Gambier-Parry JP DL and was mother of Sir Hubert Parry.

Fynes Clinton bought Guessens, near Welwyn, Hertfordshire, from the poet Edward Young, where he was seated until his death in 1852.

== Works ==
His reading was methodical (see Literary Remains of H. Fynes Clinton), whilst his Fasti, on classical chronology, has required correction on the basis of later research.

Fynes Clinton's major works are:

- Fasti Hellenici, the Civil and Literary Chronology of Greece from the 55th to the 124th Olympiad (1824–1851), including dissertations on points of Greek history and Scriptural chronology; and
- Fasti Romani, the Civil and Literary Chronology of Rome and Constantinople from the Death of Augustus to the Death of Heraclius (1845–1850).

In 1851 and 1853 respectively he published epitomes of the above. The Literary Remains of H. Fynes Clinton (the first part of which contains an autobiography written in 1818) were edited by Clinton Fynes Clinton in 1854.

== See also ==
- Earl of Lincoln

Parliament of the United Kingdom
Preceded by John Sullivan; Charles Duncombe	Member of Parliament for Aldborough; 1806–1826; With: Gilbert Jones 1806–12; Henry Dawkins 1812–14; Henry Gally Knight 1814–15; Granville Venables Vernon 1815–20; Gibbs Antrobus 1820–26	Succeeded by Clinton Fynes Clinton; Sir Alexander Grant
