= Henry Pelham-Clinton-Hope, 9th Duke of Newcastle =

British peer and aviator

His Grace The Duke of Newcastle OBE DL JP
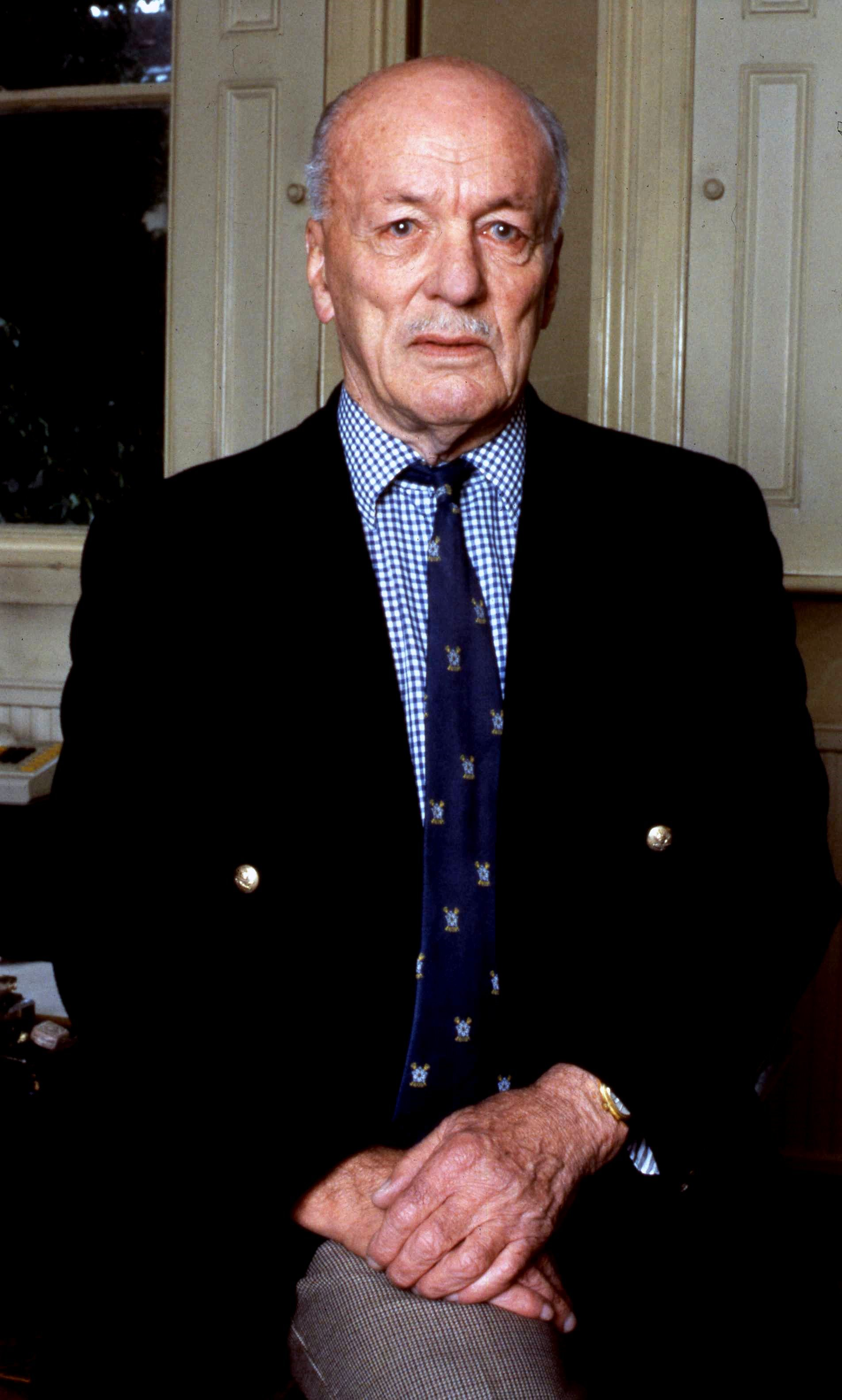
- Portrait by Allan Warren

Duke of Newcastle-under-Lyme
- In office 20 April 1941 – 4 November 1988
- Preceded by: Francis
- Succeeded by: Edward

Personal details
- Born: 8 April 1907
- Died: 4 November 1988 (aged 81)
- Spouses: Jean Gimbernat (m. 1931; div. 1940) Lady Diana Montagu-Stuart-Wortley-Mackenzie (m. 1946; div. 1959) Sally Ann Wemyss Anstice (m. 1959)
- Children: 2
- Parent: Francis Pelham-Clinton-Hope, 8th Duke of Newcastle

Military service
- Allegiance: United Kingdom
- Branch/service: Royal Auxiliary Air Force
- Rank: Wing commander
- Commands: No. 616 (South Yorkshire) (Fighter) Squadron
- Battles/wars: Second World War
- Awards: Officer of the Order of the British Empire

Henry Edward Hugh Pelham-Clinton-Hope, 9th Duke of Newcastle-under-Lyne, OBE, DL, JP (8 April 1907 – 4 November 1988), styled Earl of Lincoln from 1928 to 1941, was a British peer and aviator.

== Background ==
Born at Whitehall Court, Henry Edward Hugh Pelham-Clinton-Hope was the oldest son of Francis Pelham-Clinton-Hope, 8th Duke of Newcastle-under-Lyne, and his wife, Olive Muriel Thompson, daughter of the Australian banker George Horatio Thompson. Pelham-Clinton-Hope was educated at Sandroyd School in Surrey, followed by Eton College and then Magdalen College, Oxford. In 1928, he (and not his father) inherited the family seat of Clumber House from his uncle Henry Pelham-Clinton, 7th Duke of Newcastle-under-Lyne; and he succeeded his father as duke in 1941. The house was demolished in the late 1930s and plans to rebuild it on a smaller scale were never undertaken; the estate was sold to the National Trust in 1946. Having succeeded as Duke of Newcastle in 1941, during the 1950s he moved the family seat to Boyton Manor in Wiltshire.

== Career ==
In 1936, while known by the courtesy title of Earl of Lincoln, the future Duke joined the Royal Auxiliary Air Force and served in the No. 609 (West Riding) (Fighter) Squadron. In 1938 he was transferred to become squadron leader of No. 616 (South Yorkshire) (Fighter) Squadron. He fought in the Second World War, and after its end in 1945 was appointed an Officer of the Order of the British Empire. From 1947, he commanded an air defence unit in Hampshire as a wing commander. He was a deputy lieutenant of Nottinghamshire (1937–1948) and served the county as a justice of the peace (1933–1948).

In 1948 the Duke migrated to Southern Rhodesia, where his daughter Patricia was born. At the point of his death in 1988 his usual address was 5 Quay Hill, Lymington and he held net (probated) assets of £3,163,807 (equivalent to £8,800,000 in 2025).

== Family ==
On 23 March 1931, the then Lord Lincoln married Jean Gimbernat (died 1968), the former wife of Jules Raymond Gimbernat Jr. and daughter of Mabel Grant Hatch and Eugene Kelly Austin, adopted by her mother's second husband, David Banks of Park Avenue, New York City. They were divorced in 1940.

On 30 November 1946, the Duke of Newcastle (as he by then was) married again Lady Mary Diana Montagu-Stuart-Wortley (known as Diana; 2 June 1920 – 19 September 1997), second daughter of Archibald Montagu-Stuart-Wortley-Mackenzie, 3rd Earl of Wharncliffe, by his marriage to Lady Maud Lillian Elfreda Mary Wentworth-Fitzwilliam. By his second wife, he had two daughters:

- Lady Patricia Pelham-Clinton-Hope (born 20 July 1949); in 1971 she married firstly Alan Pariser, and was divorced in 1974; then secondly in 1981 the Canadian actor Nick Mancuso, divorced 1983. She has a son, Dorian Henry Navarr Pelham-Clinton-Hope, born in 1990, and in 2008 was living in Palm Beach, Florida.
- Lady Kathleen Marie Gabrielle Pelham-Clinton-Hope (1 January 1951 – 1 May 2016), married in 1970 Edward Vernon Reynolds (divorced), and had a daughter, Roxanna, with Alan Dawson. In 2008, she was living at Ballinakil, Kilfinny, near Croom, County Limerick, Ireland.

After another divorce in 1959, on 23 October of the same year, Newcastle married Sally Ann Wemyss (d. 2015), former wife of Fikret Jemal and eldest daughter of Brigadier John Henry Anstice, of Kyrenia, Cyprus.

Upon his death on 4 November 1988, he was briefly succeeded in the dukedom by Edward Pelham-Clinton, a descendant of a younger son of the 4th Duke, but with his successor's death on Christmas Day 1988 the dukedom became extinct. A distant Australian cousin, Edward Fiennes-Clinton, then succeeded as Earl of Lincoln.

== Coat of arms ==
Coat of arms of Henry Pelham-Clinton-Hope, 9th Duke of Newcastle
Coronet A coronet of an Duke Crest 1st (central), a broken terrestrial globe charged with a laurel leaf slipped and surmounted by a rainbow in arch all proper, the whole debruised by a bendlet sinister wavy ermine (Hope); 2nd (dexter), out of a ducal coronet gules, a plume of five ostrich feathers argent, banded with a line laid chevronways azure (Clinton); 3rd (sinister), a peacock in pride proper (Pelham). Escutcheon Quarterly: 1st and 4th azure, on a chevron or between three bezants as many laurel leaves slipped vert, all within a bordure wavy argent (Hope); 2nd argent, six cross- crosslets fitchee sable, three, two, and one, on a chief azure, two mullets or, pierced gules (Clinton); 3rd quarterly, 1st and 4th azure three pelicans argent, vulning them- selves proper; 2nd and 3rd gules, two demi- belts with buckles argent erect, the buckles in chief as an honorary augmentation (in memory of Sir John Pelham taking John, King of France, prisoner), (Pelham). Supporters Two greyhounds argent collared and lined gules. Motto Loyaulté n'a honte Loyalty knows not shame

Peerage of Great Britain
Preceded by Francis Pelham-Clinton-Hope	Duke of Newcastle-under-Lyne; 1941–1988	Succeeded by Edward Pelham-Clinton
