= Deepdene House and Gardens =

Former country house in England

Coordinates: 51°13′49″N 00°19′19″W

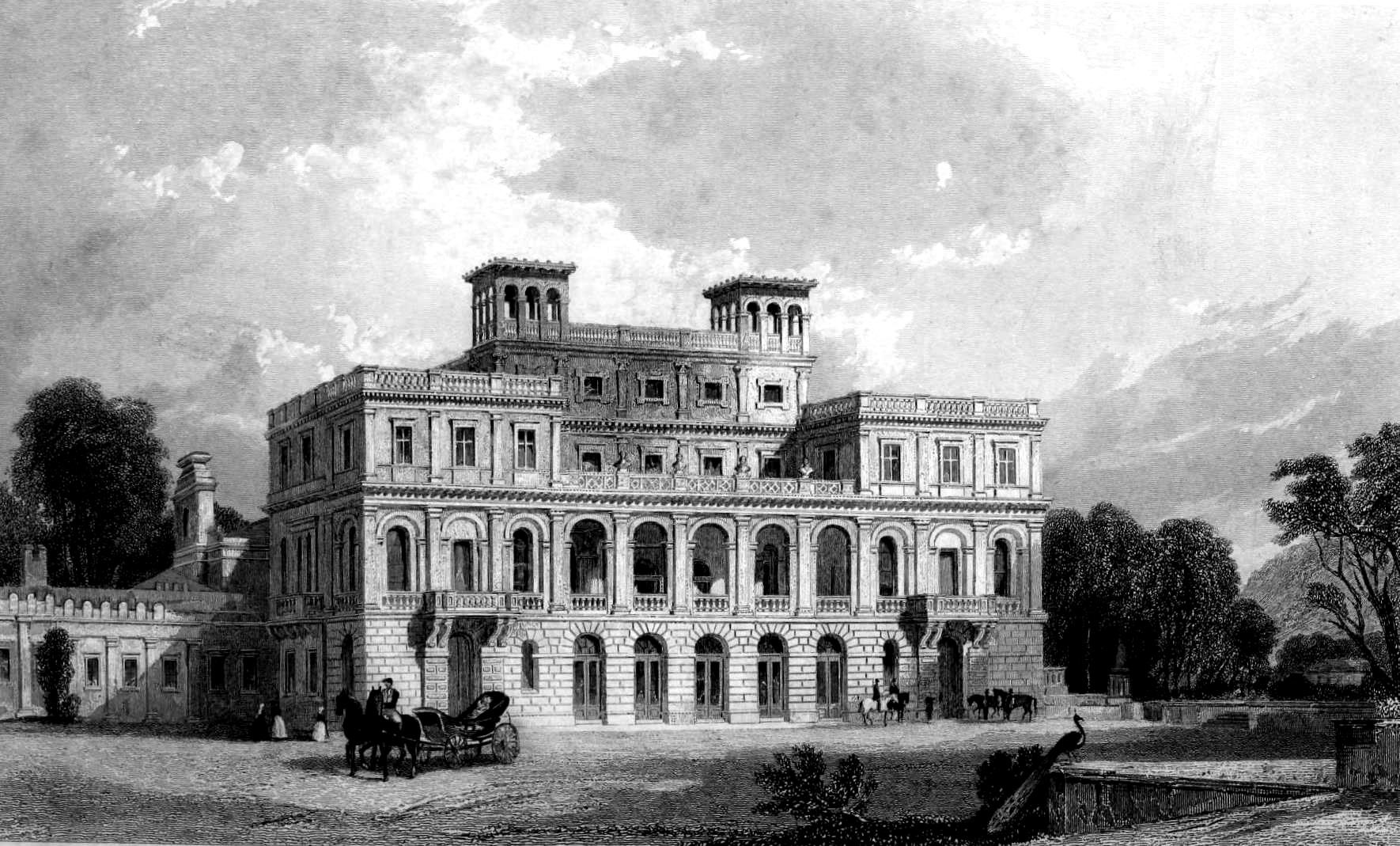
Deepdene House in 1842

Deepdene was an estate and country house occupying land to the southeast of Dorking, Surrey, England. The remains of the gardens are Grade II* listed with the adjoining Chart Park on the Register of Historic Parks and Gardens.

== History ==
=== Toponymy ===
The first record of the Deepdene is from 1401, in which it appears as le Depedene. Other early forms include Dipden, Dibden and Dubden. In 1719, the writer, John Aubrey, refers to the property as "Dibden quasi Deep Dene". The name is generally agreed to mean "deep valley", referring to the narrow, natural hollow in the hillside in the grounds.

=== Middle Ages to the 19th century ===
The first surviving mention of the Deepdene is from a court roll dating from 1401, in which the property appears to be an area of woodland. At a hearing on 11 April 1401, John Gylys, the first known tenant of the land, accused John and Alice Bouet of stealing four cartloads of timber. The next known tenant is Richard Palmer, who held the land in 1427. At the end of the 16th century, George Fuller paid an annual rent of 12 d for his holding of around 12 acres (4.9 ha).

Following the death of Henry Howard, 15th Earl of Arundel in 1652, the manor of Dorking (including the Deepdene) passed to his fourth son, Charles. Charles Howard planted a formal garden on the land, which was later visited by John Evelyn and John Aubrey. The first known habitable building, a farmhouse, is thought to have been constructed around this time.

Charles Howard's grandson, also called Charles and later the 10th Duke of Norfolk inherited the Deepdene in 1720. He demolished the mid-17th century farmhouse and built a private residence in its place. His son, the 11th Duke, established Arundel Castle as his seat and let the Deepdene to the playwright, Richard Brinsley Sheridan. In 1790, the estate was sold to William Burrell.

Deepdene House in 1826 by John Preston Neale

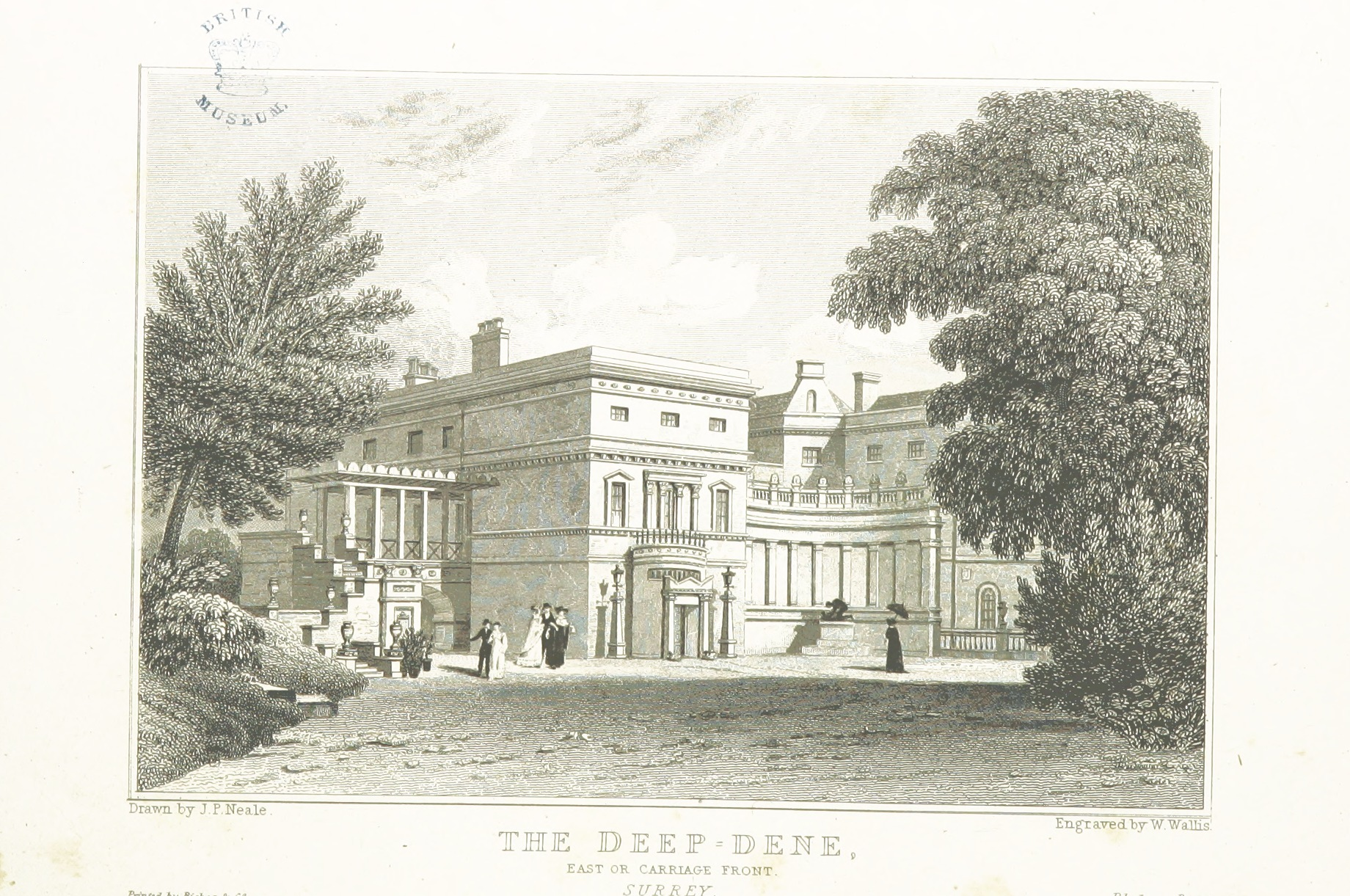
East Front

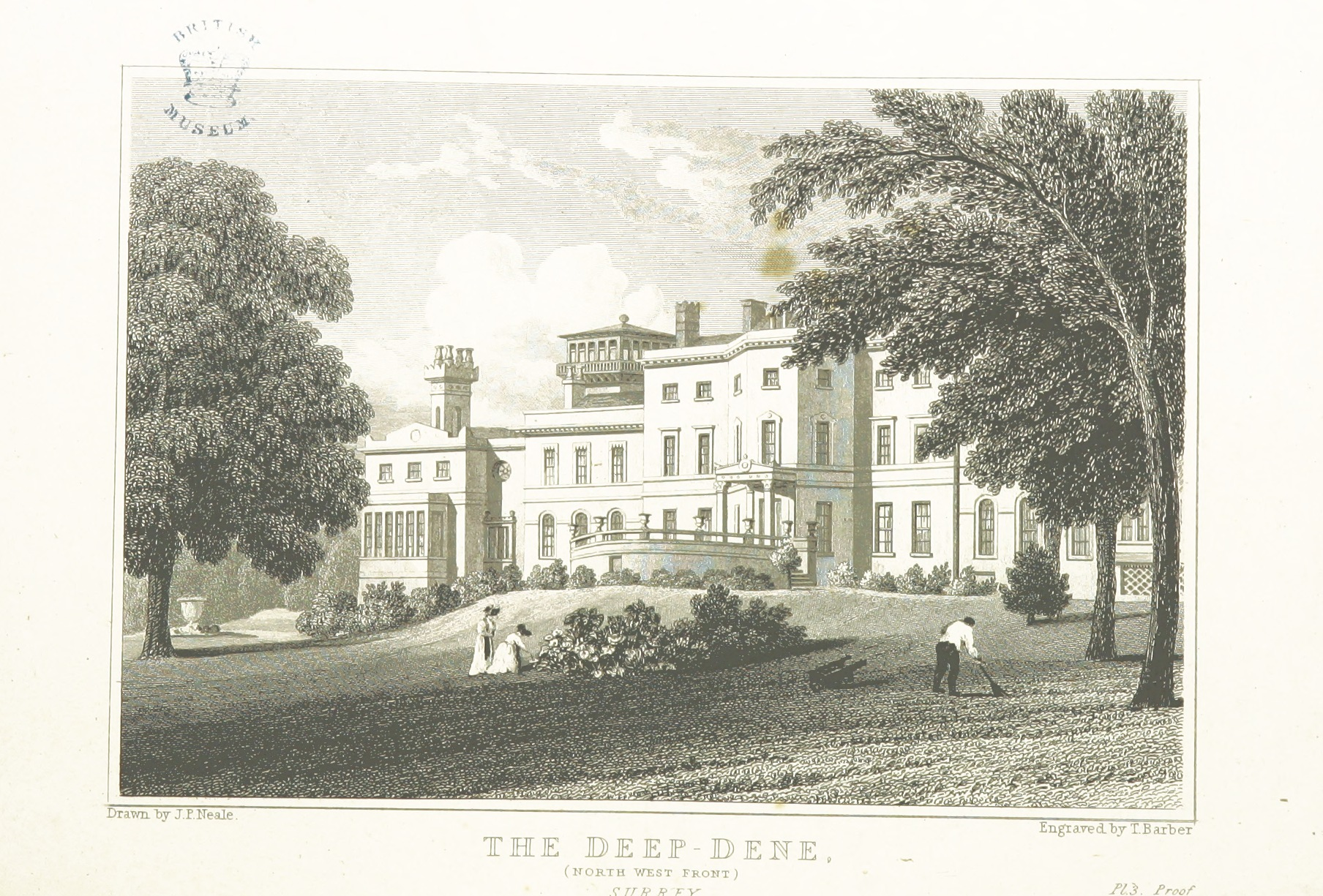
North-west Front

In 1806, Burrell's son sold the Deepdene to the banker Thomas Hope. In 1818, Hope commissioned the architect, William Atkinson to remodel the existing house, adding a tower and two new wings. The work was completed in 1823 and Hope also developed the grounds in a particular picturesque style. Hope built a mausoleum in the grounds in which he and his son were buried.

From c. 1840, the Deepdene was occupied by Hope's son, the MP Henry Hope. Between 1836 and 1841, the house was again remodelled, by the architect Alexander Roos, in the form of a great Roman villa. Hope died in 1862, but his widow continued to live at the Deepdene until her own death in 1884, when the estate passed to her grandson, Francis Hope.

Francis Hope, who later became the 8th Duke of Newcastle, never lived at the Deepdene, but used the mansion to host shooting parties. He lived a lavish lifestyle and by the early 1890s, had become heavily indebted. In 1893, the Deepdene was let to Lord William Beresford and his wife Lilian, the Dowager Duchess of Marlborough. Winston Churchill, the duchess' nephew, was a regular visitor in the 1890s. Hope was declared bankrupt in 1894 and the Deepdene was mortgaged to pay off his debts. Following Beresford's death in 1900, Lilian continued to live in the mansion until her own death in 1911.

=== 20th and 21st centuries ===
Between 1911 and 1914, Deepdene was leased to Almeric Paget, the MP for Cambridge (later he became 1st Baron Queenborough). Between December 1914 and the following June, it was used by the military, but was then left vacant. In 1917, the contents of the house, including the art and furniture collections, were sold at auction. On 20 July 1920, the mansion and the surrounding 50 acres (20 ha) were sold and, later that year, it became a hotel. In 1934, the A24 bypass road opened, cutting through the Deepdene estate close to the house.

The Southern Railway acquired the Deepdene in June 1939, to use as its headquarters in the event of war. The purchase was partly funded by the government under the air raid precautions programme. At the outbreak of the Second World War, several railway departments moved to the house including personnel reporting to the general and traffic managers, the chief engineer and the chief accountant. Tube-train sized tunnels were dug into the hillside to create offices for operational control staff and the railway telephone exchange. Radio masts were erected in front of the main house and the stable block housed the Southern Railway Savings Bank and Superannuation Fund. The rail operations associated with the Dunkirk evacuation and the Normandy landings were coordinated from Deepdene. Following the end of the war, most railway personnel returned to London, but the telephone exchange remained operational until the final British Rail staff were withdrawn in March 1966.

Deepdene House was sold by British Rail to Federated Homes Ltd in 1967. It was demolished two years later and was replaced by office buildings by the architects Scherrer & Hicks. The three-storey building received a commendation for its design from The Concrete Society in 1972. The former stable block was also demolished and replaced by an office block, known as Guthrie House. The architectural critic, Pevsner, summed up the demise of Hope's masterpiece as a "disgraceful and depressing story".

In 2018, the office buildings were acquired by the developer, Stonegate Homes, and were converted to residential apartments.

== Gardens and Terrace ==
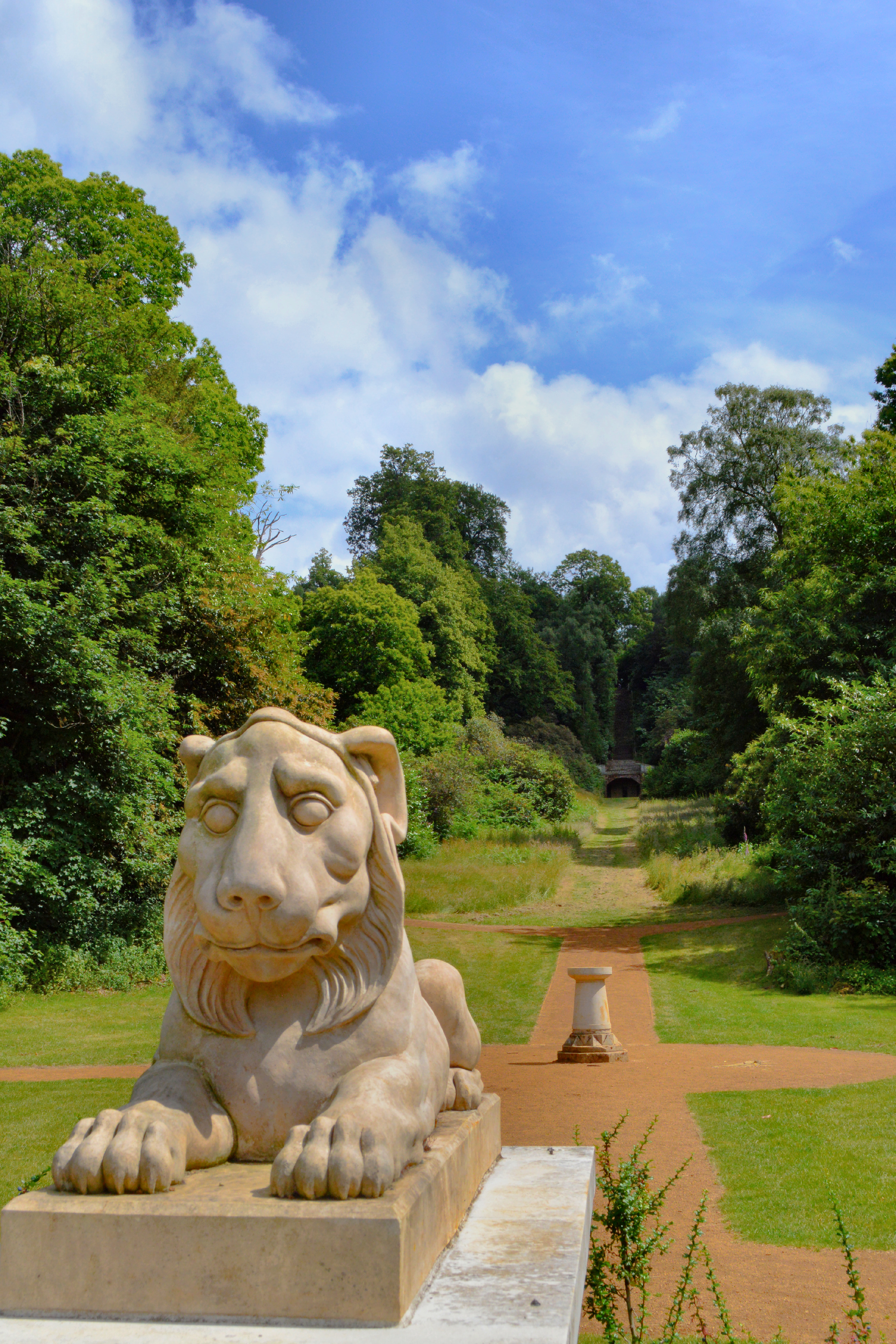
Deepdene Gardens

The gardens were laid out by Charles Howard in the 1650s. The diarist, John Evelyn recorded a visit to Deepdene on 1 August 1655:

"I went to Dorking to see Mr Cha. Howard's amphitheater, garden, or Solitaire recesse, being 15 acres, inviron'd by a hill. He shew'd us divers rare plants, caves, and an elaboratory."

John Aubrey recorded a visit in July 1673 and described the garden extensively:

"…the Honourable Charles Howard of Norfolk hath very ingeniously contriv'd a long Hope… in the most pleasant and delightful solitude for House, Gardens, Orchards, Boscages, &c. that I have seen in England… The true Name of this Hope is Dibden (quasi Deep Dene.) Mr Howard hath cast this Hope into the Form of a Theatre, on the Sides whereof he hath made several narrow Walks, like the Seats of a Theatre, one above another, above 6 in Number, done with a Plough, which are bordured with Thyme, and some Cherry-Trees, Myrtles &c. Here was a great many Orange-Trees and Syringa's, which were then in Flower. In this Garden are 21 Sorts of Thyme. The Pit (as I may call it) is stored full of rare Flowers and choice Plants…
"In the Hill on the Left Hand, (being sandy Ground) is a Cave digged 36 Paces long, 4 broad, and 5 Yards high; and at about two Thirds of the Hill (where the Crook or Bowing is) he hath dug another subterranean Walk or Passage, to be pierc'd tho' the Hill; thro' which (as thro' a Tube) you have the Visto over all the South Part of Surrey and Sussex to the Sea…"

In 1822, the horticulturalist and planner John Claudius Loudon wrote:

"The grounds are not extensive, but are highly romantic, and intersected with walks in various directions, which, with admirable liberality, are at all times open to the public."

During the Second World War, when the house was used by the Southern Railway, there were local concerns that the grounds would be sold for housing development. In July 1943, the Dorking and Leith Hill Preservation Society (chaired by the composer, Ralph Vaughan Williams) decided to purchase the terrace and garden, which were immediately transferred to Dorking Urban District Council. Covenants were placed on the land to ensure that it was kept "as a natural and peaceful woodland pleasure resort for the free use and enjoyment of the public".

Despite the custody of the council, the garden began to suffer neglect and, in 1957, the mausoleum was sealed to prevent vandalism. In 1970, the J. Gordon Elsworth Memorial Fund awarded money to improve and extend paths and to provide seating. In the mid-2010s, the garden was restored and was reopened to the public as the "Deepdene Trail".

== The Deepdene Painter ==
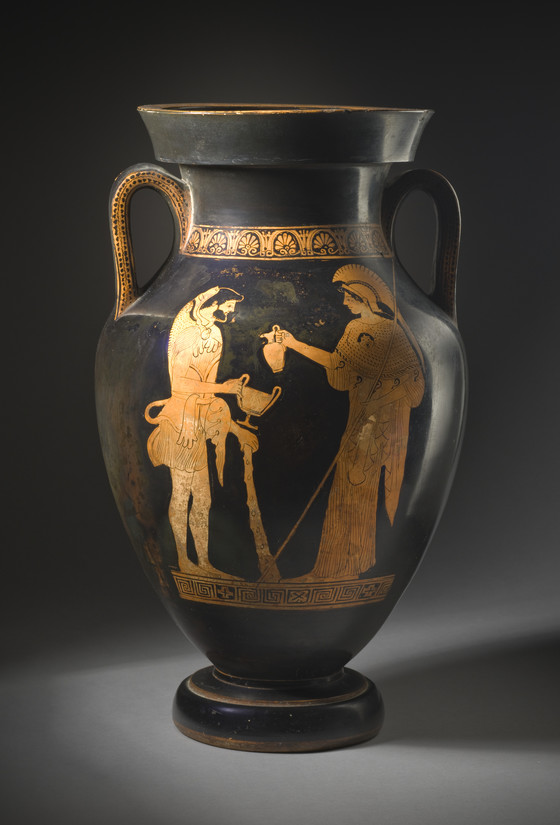
Obverse of the red-figure amphora attributed to the Deepdene Painter

Thomas Hope, who lived in the house in the 1820s, was a major collector of, among other things, Ancient Greek pottery. Sir John Beazley, who classified Attic black-figure pottery and red-figure pottery, named an otherwise anonymous painter the "Deepdene Painter" after an amphora that was in the collection of Deepdene House. This name-vase passed from the Hope Collection at Deepdene to Marshall Brooks at Tarporley and thence to William Randolph Hearst, who donated the amphora to the Los Angeles County Museum of Art, where it has the accession number 50.8.21.

== Notable residents ==
Residents of the Deepdene included:

- Charles Howard, 10th Duke of Norfolk (1720–1786)
- Charles Howard, 11th Duke of Norfolk (1746–1815)
- Sir William Burrell, 2nd Baronet (1732–1796), antiquarian
- Thomas Hope (1769–1831), merchant banker
- Henry Thomas Hope (1808–1862), MP for East Looe and Gloucester
- Lord William Beresford (1847–1900), Victoria Cross recipient
- Lily Spencer-Churchill, Dowager Duchess of Marlborough (1854–1909), wife of Lord William Beresford
- Almeric Paget, 1st Baron Queenborough (1861–1949), industrialist and politician.

== Bibliography ==
- Aubrey, John (1718). The natural history and antiquities of the county of Surrey: Begun in the year 1673, and continued to the present time. Vol. 4. London: E. Curll.
- Evelyn, John (1879). Bray, William (ed.). Diary of John Evelyn. London: Frederick Warne & Co.
- Gover, J.E.B.; Mawer, A.; Stenton, F.M. (1969). The place-names of Surrey. Cambridge: Cambridge University Press.
- Jackson, Alan A. (1999). The railway in Surrey. Penryn: Atlantic Transport Publishers. ISBN 978-0-90-689990-8.
- Loudon, John Claudius (1822). An encyclopaedia of gardening : comprising the theory and practice of horticulture, floriculture, arboriculture and landscape-gardening including all the latest improvements. England: Longman, Hurst, Rees, Orme and Brown.
- Nairn, Ian; Pevsner, Nikolaus (1971) [1962]. The Buildings of England: Surrey (2nd ed.). Harmondsworth: Penguin Books. ISBN 0-300-09675-5.
- Robinson, John Martin (2011). Felling the ancient oaks : How England lost its great country estates. London: Aurum Press. ISBN 978-1-84-513670-3.
