= Edward Pelham-Clinton, 10th Duke of Newcastle =

English lepidopterist and military officer

His Grace The Duke of Newcastle

Duke of Newcastle-under-Lyne
- In office 4 November 1988 – 25 December 1988
- Preceded by: Henry Pelham-Clinton-Hope, 9th Duke of Newcastle-under-Lyne
- Succeeded by: Peerage extinct

Personal details
- Born: Edward Pelham-Clinton; 18 August 1920
- Died: 25 December 1988 (aged 68)

Military service
- Rank: Captain
- Unit: British Army: Royal Artillery
- Awards: Mentioned in dispatches

Edward Charles Pelham-Clinton, 10th Duke of Newcastle-under-Lyne (18 August 1920 – 25 December 1988), was an English lepidopterist and military officer as well as Duke of Newcastle for less than two months at the end of his life, inheriting the titles from a third cousin. He was thus briefly a member of the House of Lords.

== Education and career ==
Pelham-Clinton was the son of Guy Edward Pelham-Clinton, an army officer and a grandson of Lord Charles Clinton, who was a younger son of Henry Pelham-Clinton, 4th Duke of Newcastle. He was educated at Eton, and Trinity College, Oxford, and during the Second World War served as an officer in the Royal Artillery, rising to the rank of captain and being mentioned in dispatches. His younger brother, Alastair Pelham-Clinton, was a Royal Air Force Flying Officer and died in 1943 aged twenty.

Pelham-Clinton was interested in lepidopterology from a young age and specialized in entomology at Cambridge. An expert in the subject, from 1960 to 1980 he was Deputy Keeper of the Royal Scottish Museum, in Edinburgh. He acted as an associate editor of six volumes of the series The Moths and Butterflies of Great Britain and Ireland, in which he wrote articles about Tineidae, Choreutidae, and Glyphipterigidae, and was working on Elachistidae at the time of his death. A building in Dinton Pastures Country Park was named after him by the British Entomological and Natural History Society, of which he had been a member.

== Succession to peerages ==
Pelham-Clinton succeeded a third cousin in the earldom and dukedom in November 1988. He died one month and 21 days later, aged 68, unmarried. As all other heirs male from the second duke's line had died, the dukedom became extinct, but the peerage of Earl of Lincoln was inherited by Edward Fiennes-Clinton, a distant kinsman in Australia. He left an estate valued for probate at £2,222,203, equivalent to £7,500,000 in 2023, and his stated usual abode was Furzeleigh House, Axminster.

== Coat of arms ==
Coat of arms of Edward Pelham-Clinton, 10th Duke of Newcastle
| Coronet A coronet of an Duke Crest 1st, out of a ducal coronet gules, a plume of five ostrich feathers argent, banded azure ; 2nd, a peacock in pride proper. Escutcheon Quarterly: 1st and 4th argent, six cross crosslets, three, two and one, sable, on a chief azure two mullets pierced gules (Clinton); 2nd and 3rd, quarterly, 1st and 4th azure, three pelicans vulning themselves argent; and 2nd and 3rd gules, two pieces of belts with buckles erect in pale, the buckles upwards argent (Pelham). Supporters Two greyhounds argent collared and lined gules. Motto Loyaulté n'a honte Loyalty knows not shame |

Peerage of Great Britain
| Preceded by Henry Pelham-Clinton-Hope | Duke of Newcastle-under-Lyne; November–December 1988 | Extinct |
Peerage of England
| Preceded by Henry Pelham-Clinton-Hope | Earl of Lincoln; November–December 1988 | Succeeded by Edward Fiennes-Clinton |
