= A. Maitland Emmet =

British scientist & teacher (1908-2001)

Arthur Maitland Emmet
- Born: 15 July 1908; West Hendred, Oxfordshire
- Died: 3 March 2001 (aged 92)
- Citizenship: British
- Education: Sherborne School; University College, Oxford
- Known for: Micro-moths
- Awards: Stamford Raffles Award
- Scientific career
- Fields: Lepidopterist
- Workplaces: St Edward's School, Oxford
- Military career
- Allegiance: United Kingdom
- Branch: British Army
- Service years: 1939-1945
- Rank: Lieutenant-Colonel
- Units: 6th Oxford and Buckinghamshire Light Infantry; 25th Indian Division
- Conflicts: World War II; Arakan campaign

Lieutenant Colonel Arthur Maitland Emmet MBE (15 July 1908 – 3 March 2001) was an amateur entomologist and a former schoolmaster who taught Latin, English and Ancient Greek. He was a former president of the British Entomological and Natural History Society, a former president of the Amateur Entomologists' Society, and a vice-president of the Royal Entomological Society, having been elected a fellow of that society in 1984. Among other positions held in relation to his entomological work are:

- Fellow of the Linnean Society of London
- Member of Societas Europaea Lepidopterologica

During his life, Maitland Emmet became one of Britain's leading specialists in the microlepidoptera, as well as a classical scholar.

== Early life ==
Born in the vicarage at West Hendred, Oxfordshire, the youngest son of a clergyman, who later became Chaplain of University College, Oxford, he went to Sherborne School and also to University College, Oxford. He was given a butterfly net for his thirteenth birthday and searching his school grounds for butterflies caught a comma (1921), the first Dorset record since the 19th century. While studying greats at Oxford he was interested in rowing, learnt to fly and bought a government surplus biplane. As a master at St Edwards School, Oxford he revived the field club which reignited his interests in British Lepidoptera. He served during the war in India and Burma with the 6th Oxford and Buckinghamshire Light Infantry, rising to the rank of lieutenant-colonel. He served with the 25th Indian Division and was made MBE for his official history of the Arakan campaign in Burma. In the same period, he collected and published a checklist of Bird species he encountered during the campaign. While in India, there was time to watch and collect butterflies.

== Retirement ==
Emmet retired in 1957 and spent some years living in Bristol with his sister Margery and working as a part-time selector for the RAF and as an examiner for the London University Examinations Board. In 1964 he moved to Saffron Walden, Essex, to care for his elderly mother and aunt until their deaths in 1972.

In the 1960s he studied the Nepticulidae, breeding many species from their leaf mines and the larvae within. In August 1966 he published notes on "the smaller moths" in the AES Bulletin. The first of many he was to contribute. He was a leading member of many natural history societies, serving as president of the British Entomological and Natural History Society in 1971, the Amateur Entomologists' Society in 1975 and the Essex Field Club (1985–86). He was elected as a fellow of the Linnean Society in 1973 and honorary fellow of the Royal Entomological Society in 1984. From the beginning he was an editor and author of The Moths and Butterflies of Great Britain and Ireland becoming senior editor in 1987.

Emmet was a bachelor until his 60s marrying Katie Tinne, the widow of a close friend in 1972. She developed the garden and Emmet identified 990 species of butterfly and moth, which he believed to be the highest total for a garden in Britain. The couple visited all fifty-three of the 10 km squares in Essex searching for leaf mines and catching moths in a light trap.

== Bibliography ==
Maitland Emmet was author, co-author or editor of a number of works devoted to entomological topics, but his best-known publication is The Scientific Names of the British Lepidoptera: Their History and Meaning, which is considered the definitive work of its kind. As well as an in-depth analysis of scientific names, this work covers in considerable detail the detective work required to shed light upon the work of past taxonomists, several of whom (most notably Johan Christian Fabricius) took delight in setting convoluted puzzles for their peers. A quote from Maitland Emmet's book in this respect is apposite and illuminating:

"Scientific names have much in common with crossword puzzles. The nomenclator is the setter; he searches for a name that is neat and appropriate and if he can mystify his fellow entomologists, he will derive sadistic pleasure in so doing" (p. 13)

- The Arakan Campaign Of The Twenty-fifth Indian Division. March 1944 – March 1945, (1946)
- Field Guide To The Smaller British Lepidoptera, (1979) ISBN 0-9502891-6-7, became the bible of British microlepidopterists
- A Field Guide to the Small Moths of Essex, (1981)
- The Larger Moths and Butterflies of Essex, (1985) ISBN 0-9056371-3-5
- The Scientific Names of the British Lepidoptera: Their History and Meaning, (1991) ISBN 0-9465893-5-6
