= Clinton James Fynes Clinton =

British barrister & politician (1792-1833)

Fiennes-Clinton arms

Clinton James Fynes Clinton later Fiennes-Clinton (13 December 1792 – 13 April 1833) was an English barrister and Tory politician who served as Member of Parliament for Aldborough from 1826 to 1832.

== Family ==
Descended from Henry Clinton, 2nd Earl of Lincoln KB, via Sir Henry Clinton (1587–1641), who assumed the surname Fynes upon inheriting his mother’s Lincolnshire estates including Kirkstead Abbey. as minor gentry, the patronage of a mediety of the advowson of Kirkby Laythorpe devolved with the Fynes cadet branch seated at White Hall, Martin-by-Timberland, Lincolnshire. The family's wealth dissipated, becoming déclassée until Sir Henry's great-great-great-grandson, Norreys Fynes (1717–1764) married into the family of Sir William Thompson, Lord Mayor of London. His son the Revd Preb Charles Fynes DCL (1748–1827) resumed the additional surname and arms of Clinton by Royal Licence in 1821.

His elder brother was the classical scholar, Henry Fynes Clinton MP and his younger brother was the Revd Charles John Fynes Clinton.

Clinton Fynes Clinton married in 1825 Penelope Welby (died 1834), second daughter of Sir William Earle Welby, 2nd Bt, MP, and died 11 April 1833, leaving 4 sons and 5 daughters; his eldest son, the Revd Henry Fiennes-Clinton (1826–1911), Rector of Cromwell, Nottinghamshire, was great-grandfather of Edward Fiennes-Clinton, 18th Earl of Lincoln.

== See also ==
- Duke of Newcastle
