= Francis Pelham-Clinton-Hope, 8th Duke of Newcastle =

English nobleman

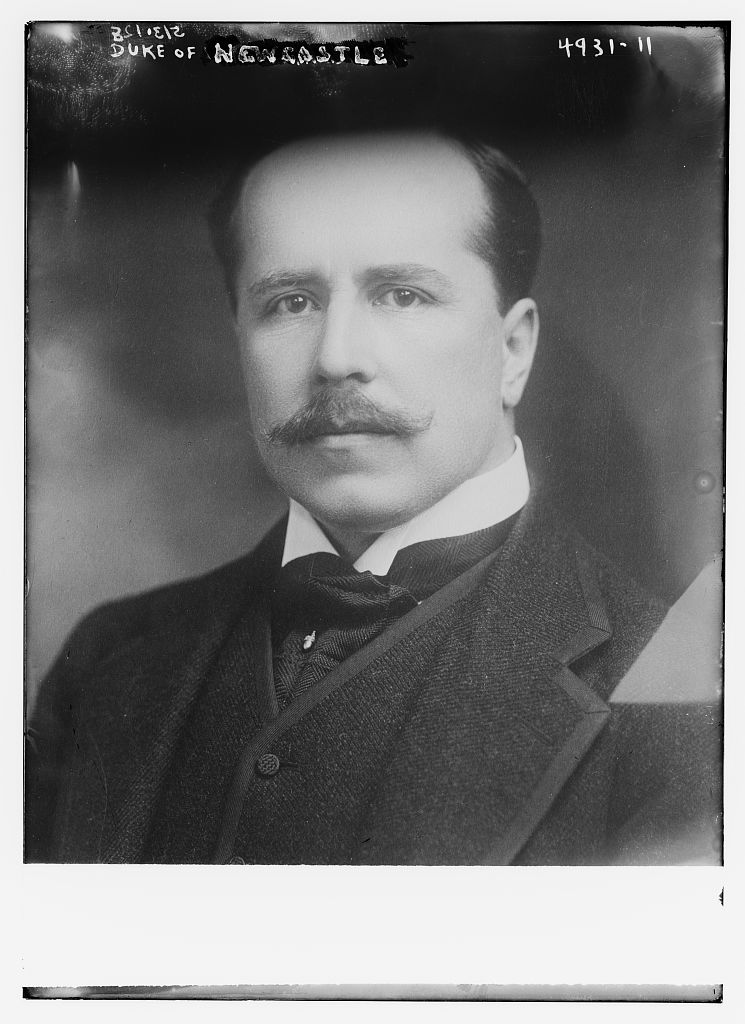
Lord Francis Hope (not yet Duke of Newcastle) in 1919

Henry Francis Hope Pelham-Clinton-Hope, 8th Duke of Newcastle-under-Lyne (3 February 1866 – 20 April 1941) was an English nobleman.

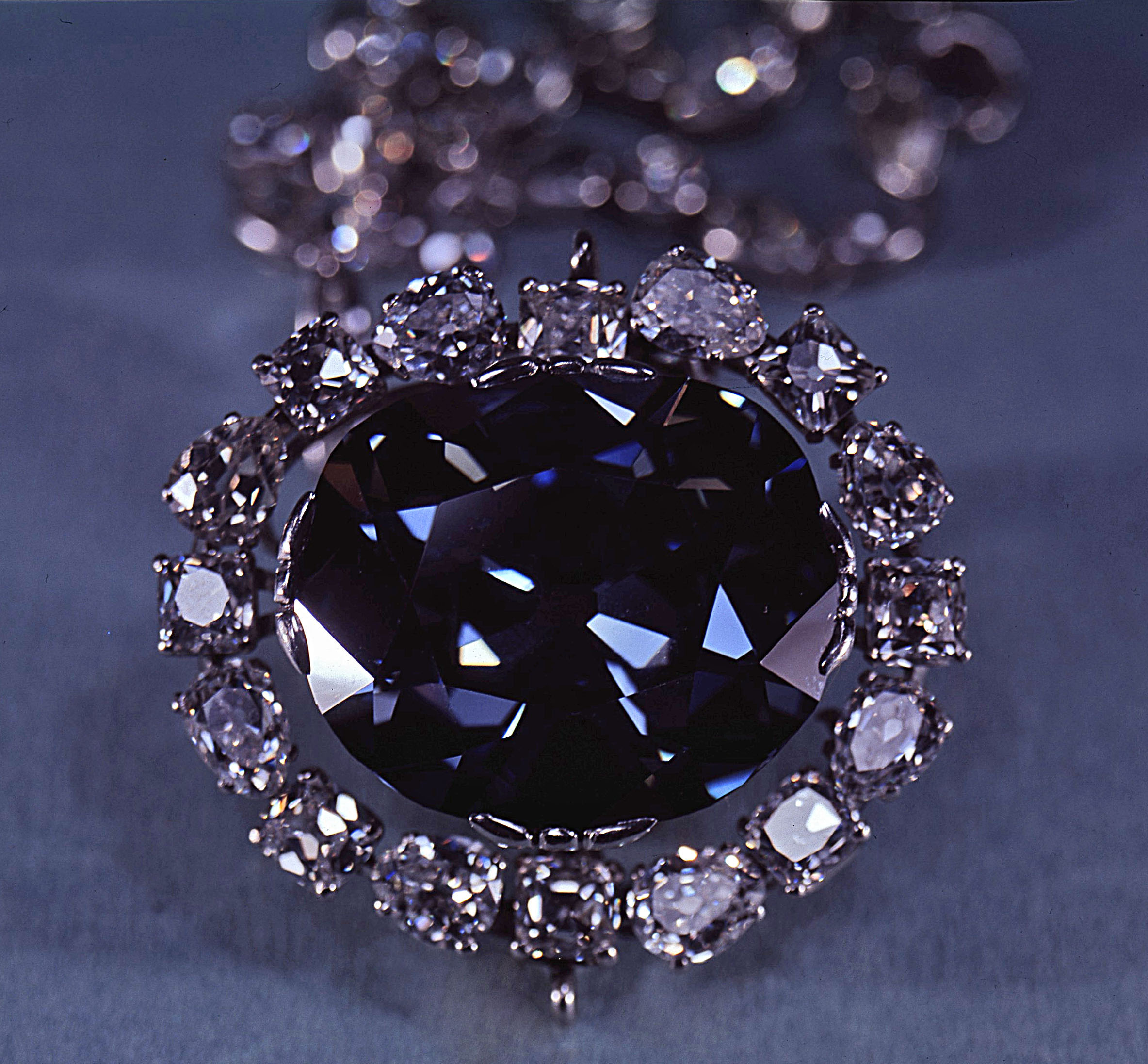
The Hope Diamond

== Biography ==
Born in 1866, Hope was son of Henry Pelham-Clinton, 6th Duke of Newcastle. He was educated at Eton College and Trinity Hall, Cambridge.

He inherited the estate of his grandmother, Anne Adele Hope (widow of Henry Thomas Hope) in 1884, upon condition that he assume the name and arms of Hope upon reaching his majority; he did so in 1887 and became known as Lord Francis Hope. This bequest included the well-known Hope Diamond. Lord Francis held a commission as Lieutenant of the Nottinghamshire (Sherwood Rangers) Yeomanry until he resigned in April 1894. He was Sheriff of Monaghan for 1897 and 1917.

He married American actress May Yohé in November 1894. She had gained fame on the London stage in 1893 and 1894, especially in the burlesque Little Christopher Columbus. He led an extravagant lifestyle, which the two continued together, and was discharged in bankruptcy in 1896. One journal wrote: "Pecuniary troubles, however, embarrassed the two but slightly. A future Duke and Duchess can always beg or borrow, and they did, as well as sell off most of the Hope Collection of Pictures. In 1900 they made a tour of the world, and on their way home fell in with Captain [Putnam] Bradlee Strong, at that time one of the handsomest and most popular men in the United States Army, and a special favourite with President McKinley. The actress fell head over ears in love with him. She refused to return to England with Lord Francis". During the marriage, Yohé continued to perform on stage in London.

Hope divorced Yohé in 1902; at this time, he obtained court permission to sell off the Hope Diamond to pay some of his debts. After lengthy litigation in the Court of Chancery, he was able to break the entail on most of his grandmother's trusts, and sold Deepdene House, Dorking, Surrey and Hope Castle in County Monaghan, Ireland.

Lord Francis married Olive Muriel Owen, née Thompson, in 1904. They had 3 children:

- Henry Edward Hugh Pelham-Clinton-Hope, 9th Duke of Newcastle-under-Lyne (1907–1988)
- Lady Doria Lois Pelham-Clinton-Hope (1908–1942)
- Lady Mary Pelham-Clinton-Hope (1910–1982)

He inherited the dukedom from his brother, Henry Pelham-Clinton, in 1928 and died in 1941 aged 75 at Clumber Park.

Papers relating to the 8th Duke's affairs are now held at Manuscripts and Special Collections, The University of Nottingham.

== Coat of arms ==
Coat of arms of Francis Pelham-Clinton-Hope, 8th Duke of Newcastle
| Coronet A coronet of a Duke Crest 1st (central), a broken terrestrial globe charged with a laurel leaf slipped and surmounted by a rainbow in arch all proper, the whole debruised by a bendlet sinister wavy ermine (Hope); 2nd (dexter), out of a ducal coronet gules, a plume of five ostrich feathers argent, banded with a line laid chevronways azure (Clinton); 3rd (sinister), a peacock in pride proper (Pelham). Escutcheon Quarterly: 1st and 4th azure, on a chevron or between three bezants as many laurel leaves slipped vert, all within a bordure wavy argent (Hope); 2nd argent, six cross- crosslets fitchee sable, three, two, and one, on a chief azure, two mullets or, pierced gules (Clinton); 3rd quarterly, 1st and 4th azure three pelicans argent, vulning them- selves proper; 2nd and 3rd gules, two demi- belts with buckles argent erect, the buckles in chief as an honorary augmentation (in memory of Sir John Pelham taking John, King of France, prisoner), (Pelham). Supporters Two greyhounds argent collared and lined gules. Motto Loyaulté n'a honte Loyalty knows not shame |

Peerage of Great Britain
| Preceded by Henry Pelham-Clinton | Duke of Newcastle-under-Lyne; 1928–1941 | Succeeded by Henry Pelham-Clinton-Hope |
