= Gilbert Holles, 3rd Earl of Clare =

English politician (1633–1689)

Gilbert Holles, 3rd Earl of Clare (24 April 1633 – 16 January 1689) was an English politician who sat in the House of Commons in 1660. He was styled Lord Haughton from 1637 until he succeeded to the title Earl of Clare in 1666.

== Life ==
Holles was the son of John Holles, 2nd Earl of Clare and Elizabeth Vere, daughter of Horace Vere, 1st Baron Vere of Tilbury. He was baptised at the Church of St John-at-Hackney on 18 May 1633. His godfathers were his grandfathers, John Holles, 1st Earl of Clare and Horatio, Baron Vere: his godmother was Mary Courteen, Countess of Kent.

He travelled abroad in 1645. In April 1660, he was elected Member of Parliament for Nottinghamshire in the Convention Parliament.

Holles died in 1689 and was buried at Haughton.

== Family ==
Holles married Grace Pierrepont, daughter of Hon. William Pierrepont and Elizabeth Harris, on 9 July 1655 in St Giles in the Fields Church, London, England. They had seven children:

- Lady Grace Holles (1656 – 1700), married on 21 May 1686 Thomas Pelham, 1st Baron Pelham of Laughton
- Lady Elizabeth Holles (1658 – 9 November 1725), married in 1676 Christopher Vane, 1st Baron Barnard
- John Holles, 1st Duke of Newcastle-upon-Tyne (1662 – 1711)
- Lady Mary Holles (1664 – 1715), married Hugh Boscawen
- Hon. William Holles (1666-1680), died young.
- Hon. Denzell Holles (1668 – 1680), died young.
- Lady Ann Holles (born 1674)

== Coat of arms ==
Coat of arms of Gilbert Holles, 3rd Earl of Clare
Coronet A coronet of an Earl Crest A boar passant azure tusked and bristled or. Escutcheon Ermine, two piles in point sable. Supporters Dexter: a lion or; sinister, a tiger or. Motto Spes audaces adjuvat.

Parliament of England
Preceded by Colonel John Hutchinson	Member of Parliament for Nottinghamshire; 1660–1661; With: William Pierrepont	Succeeded by Anthony Eyre; Sir Gervase Clifton, Bt
Peerage of England
Preceded by John Holles	Earl of Clare; 1666–1689	Succeeded by John Holles
