= Henry Pelham-Clinton, 7th Duke of Newcastle =

English nobleman (1864–1928)

His Grace The Duke of Newcastle-under-Lyne
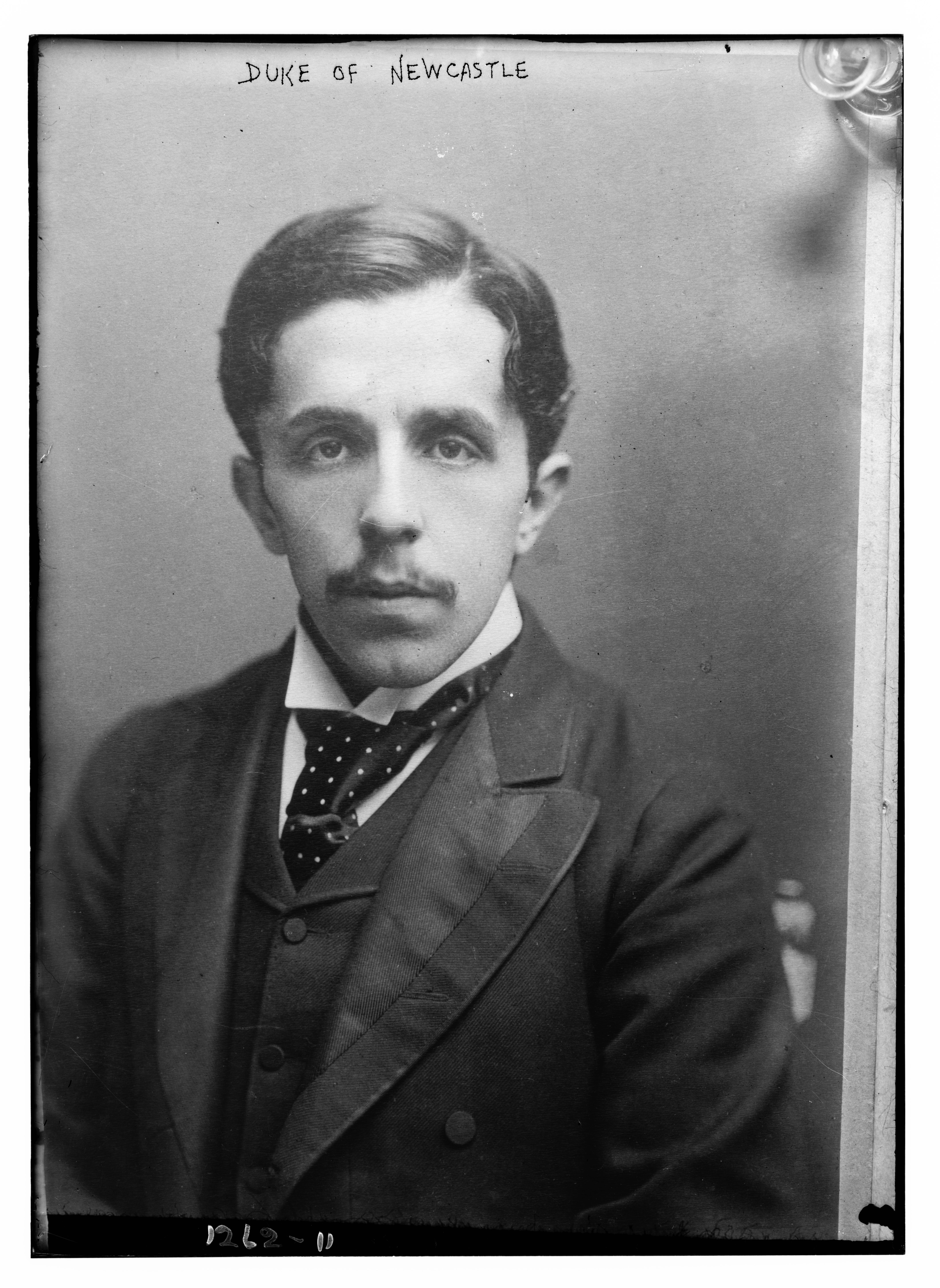
- Newcastle c. 1890
- Born: 28 September 1864
- Died: 30 May 1928 (aged 63)
- Education: Eton College; Magdalen College, Oxford
- Spouse: Kathleen Florence May Candy (m. 1889)
- Parents: Henry Pelham-Clinton (father); Henrietta Adela Hope (mother)
- Relatives: Francis Pelham-Clinton-Hope (brother); Lady Susan Hamilton (paternal grandmother); Henry Pelham-Clinton (paternal grandfather)

Henry Pelham Archibald Douglas Pelham-Clinton, 7th Duke of Newcastle-under-Lyne (28 September 1864 – 30 May 1928), was an English nobleman, styled Earl of Lincoln until 1879.

== Biography ==
Henry was educated at Eton College and then Magdalen College, Oxford.

He held a number of local offices appropriate to his rank and station, such as High Steward of Retford, Master Forester of Dartmoor and Keeper of St Briavel's Castle.

He had poor health and played only a small part in public life. As a staunch Anglo-Catholic he spoke on ecclesiastical issues in the House of Lords.

One of his achievements was the restoration of the fortunes of his family estate. In 1879 a serious fire destroyed much of Clumber House; he had it magnificently rebuilt to designs by the younger Charles Barry. The Duke was actively involved in the rebuilding process, and in particular in the design and building of the magnificent St Mary the Virgin Chapel in the grounds. He was also responsible for the establishment of the Clumber Choir School. His Thames Valley estate was at Forest Farm in Winkfield. He was also a president of the Church of England Society for the Maintenance of the Faith.

Some of the 7th Duke's personal papers are now held at Manuscripts and Special Collections, The University of Nottingham.

== Family ==
He was married to Kathleen Florence May Candy in 1889.

== Coat of arms ==
Coat of arms of Henry Pelham-Clinton, 7th Duke of Newcastle
Coronet A coronet of an Duke Crest 1st, out of a ducal coronet gules, a plume of five ostrich feathers argent, banded azure; 2nd, a peacock in pride proper. Escutcheon Quarterly: 1st and 4th argent, six cross crosslets, three, two and one, sable, on a chief azure two mullets pierced gules (Clinton); 2nd and 3rd, quarterly, 1st and 4th azure, three pelicans vulning themselves argent; and 2nd and 3rd gules, two pieces of belts with buckles erect in pale, the buckles upwards argent (Pelham). Supporters Two greyhounds argent collared and lined gules. Motto Loyaulté n'a honte Loyalty knows not shame

Peerage of Great Britain
Preceded by Henry Pelham-Clinton	Duke of Newcastle-under-Lyne; 1879–1928	Succeeded by Francis Pelham-Clinton-Hope
