= Duchess of Bedford =

Title given to the wife of the Duke of Bedford

Duchess of Bedford is a title given to the wife of the Duke of Bedford, an extant title in the peerage of England which was first created in 1414.

== Duchesses of Bedford ==
1st creation (1414)

- Anne of Burgundy (1404–1432), 1st wife of John of Lancaster, Duke of Bedford
- Jacquetta of Luxembourg (1415/16–1472), 2nd wife of John of Lancaster, Duke of Bedford

5th creation (1485)

- Catherine Woodville, Duchess of Buckingham (c.1458–1497), wife of Jasper Tudor, 1st Duke of Bedford

6th creation (1694)

- Elizabeth Howland (1682–1724), wife of Wriothesley Russell, 2nd Duke of Bedford
- Anne Russell, Duchess of Bedford (Lady Anne Egerton) (c.1705–1762), wife of Wriothesley Russell, 3rd Duke of Bedford
- Diana Russell, Duchess of Bedford (Lady Diana Spencer) (1710–1735), 1st wife of John Russell, 4th Duke of Bedford
- Hon. Gertrude Russell, Duchess of Bedford (1715-1794), 2nd wife of John Russell, 4th Duke of Bedford
- Georgiana Russell, Duchess of Bedford (Lady Georgiana Gordon) (1781–1853), 2nd wife of John Russell, 6th Duke of Bedford
- Anna Russell, Duchess of Bedford (Anna Maria Stanhope) (1783–1857), wife of Francis Russell, 7th Duke of Bedford
- Elizabeth Russell, Duchess of Bedford (Lady Elizabeth Sackville-West) (1818–1897), wife of Francis Russell, 9th Duke of Bedford
- Adeline Marie Russell, Duchess of Bedford (Lady Adeline Marie Somers) (1852–1920), wife of George Russell, 10th Duke of Bedford
- Mary Russell, Duchess of Bedford (Mary du Caurroy Tribe) (1865–1937), wife of Herbrand Russell, 11th Duke of Bedford
- Louisa Russell, Duchess of Bedford (Louisa Whitwell) (1893–1960), wife of Hastings Russell, 12th Duke of Bedford
- Lydia Lyle (1917–2006), 2nd wife of Ian Russell, 13th Duke of Bedford
- Nicole Russell, Duchess of Bedford (Nicole Milinaire) (1920–2012), 3rd wife of Ian Russell, 13th Duke of Bedford
- Henrietta Russell, Duchess of Bedford (b.1940) (née Henrietta Joan Tiarks), wife of Robin Russell, 14th Duke of Bedford
- Louise Rona Crammond (b.1962), wife of Andrew Russell, 15th Duke of Bedford
