= Eugene Deckers =

Belgian actor (1917–1977)

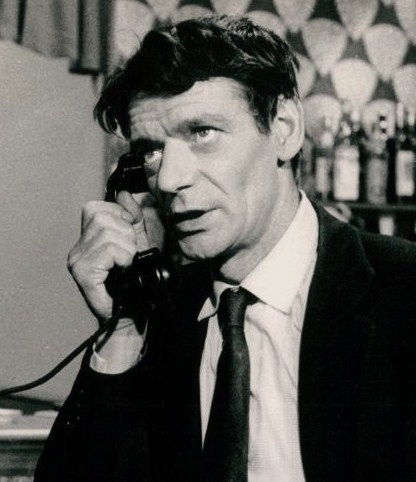
- Deckers in Crack in the Mirror (1960)
- Born: Eugene Francis Deckers; 22 October 1917; Antwerp, Belgium
- Died: 1977 (aged 59–60); Paris, France
- Occupation: Actor
- Years active: 1947–1960

Eugene Francis Deckers (22 October 1917 in Antwerp – 1977 in Paris, France) was a Belgian actor.

== Career ==
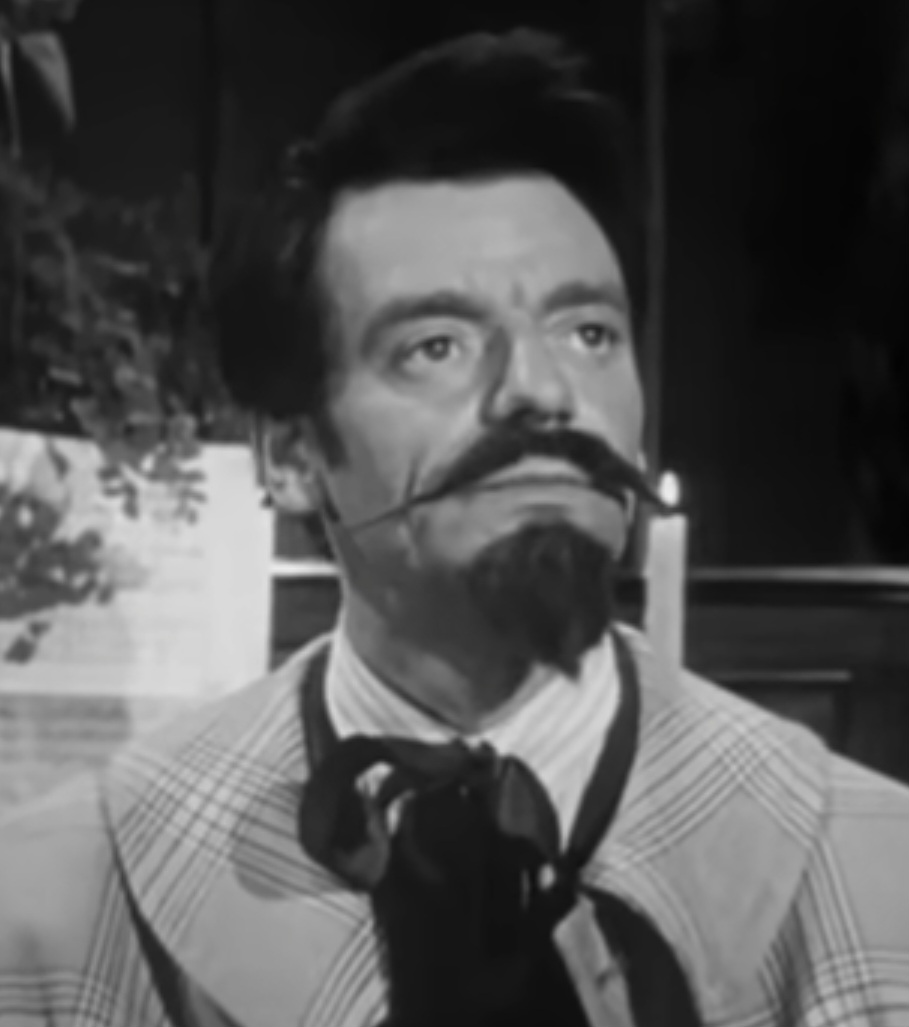
Deckers in an episode of Sherlock Holmes (1954)

After establishing himself on the British stage, Deckers made his first English language film appearance in 1946. Formerly a romantic lead, he specialised in "continental" character roles, playing many an obsequious concierge and imperious diplomat. As he grew older, Deckers expanded his characterisation range to include Germans and Italians as well as Frenchmen. One of his biggest and best roles was as the arms dealer Peters in North West Frontier (1959). Deckers appeared in Sheldon Reynolds television series Foreign Intrigue in the early 1950s. In 1954–55, Deckers played at least seven different characters in the French-filmed Sheldon Reynolds television series Sherlock Holmes. After appearing in over fifty film and television roles, Deckers made his final screen appearance in the 1969 film The Assassination Bureau. While working as an actor, Eugene Deckers also worked as a painter. He is the great-uncle of singer Eliza Roe.

== Filmography ==
- While the Sun Shines (1947) as Lieutenant Colbert
- Woman to Woman (1947) as De Rillac
- Dual Alibi (1947) as French Ringmaster
- Mrs. Fitzherbert (1947) as Philippe
- Against the Wind (1948) as Marcel Van Hecke
- Sleeping Car to Trieste (1948) as Jules
- Prince of Foxes (1949) as Borgia Henchman (uncredited)
- Golden Salamander (1950) as Police Chief
- Madeleine (1950) as Thuau
- So Long at the Fair (1950) as Day Porter
- Tony Draws a Horse (1950) as French Waiter (uncredited)
- The Elusive Pimpernel (1950) as Captain Merieres
- Highly Dangerous (1950) as Alf - the 'contact'
- Night Without Stars (1951) as Armand
- Captain Horatio Hornblower R.N. (1951) as French Commandant
- The Lavender Hill Mob (1951) as Customs Official
- Hotel Sahara (1951) as French Spahi Officer
- Foreign Intrigue (1953) as Various Roles
- The Love Lottery (1954) as Vernet
- Father Brown (1954) as French Cavalry Officer
- Sherlock Holmes (1954, TV) as Various Roles
- The Colditz Story (1955) as La Tour
- Doctor at Sea (1955) as Colonel Perello, chief of police
- Man of the Moment (1955) as Day Lift Man
- Colonel March of Scotland Yard (1956, TV) as Phillipe
- Women Without Men (1956) as Pierre
- Port Afrique (1956) as Colonel Moussac
- The Iron Petticoat (1956) as Bartender
- Foreign Intrigue (1956) as Sandoz
- House of Secrets (1956) as Vidal
- Let's Be Happy (1957) as Dining Car Attendant
- Seven Thunders (1957) as Emile Blanchard
- Law and Disorder (1958) as French Fisherman (uncredited)
- Le fauve est lâché (1959) as Toni Luigi
- North West Frontier (1959) as Peters
- Crack in the Mirror (1960) as Magre
- A Weekend with Lulu (1961) as Inspector Larue
- The Saint (1962, TV) as Inspector Quercy
- The Longest Day (1962) as German Major In Church (uncredited)
- Blague dans le coin (1963) as Bennet
- Coplan Takes Risks (1964)
- Lady L (1965) as Koenigstein
- The Rat Catchers (1966, TV) as Henri Dupont
- The Restaurant (1966) as Le complice de Novalès
- The Last Safari (1967) as Refugee Leader
- Hell Is Empty (1967) as Counsel
- The Limbo Line (1968) as Cadillet
- The Assassination Bureau (1969) as 'La Belle Amie' desk clerk (uncredited)
