= Sherlock Holmes (1954 TV series) =

American TV series (1954–1955)

- Based on: Characters created by Sir Arthur Conan Doyle
- Directed by: Steve Previn; Sheldon Reynolds; Jack Gage
- Starring: Ronald Howard; H. Marion Crawford; Archie Duncan
- Composer: Paul Durand
- Country of origin: United States
- Original language: English
- No. of seasons: 1
- No. of episodes: 39

Production
- Producer: Sheldon Reynolds
- Production locations: Epinay-sur-Seine; Elizabeth Tower; Victoria Embankment
- Cinematography: Raymond Clunie
- Editors: George Gale; Françoise Javet
- Production company: Guild Films

Original release
- Network: First-run syndication
- Release: October 18, 1954 – October 17, 1955

Sherlock Holmes is an American detective television series syndicated in the autumn of 1954, based on the Sherlock Holmes stories of Arthur Conan Doyle. The 39 half-hour mostly original stories were produced by Sheldon Reynolds and filmed in France by Guild Films, starring Ronald Howard (son of Leslie Howard) as Holmes and H. Marion Crawford as Watson. Archie Duncan appeared in many episodes as Inspector Lestrade (and in a few as other characters). Richard Larke, billed as Kenneth Richards, played Sgt. Wilkins in about fifteen episodes. The series' associate producer, Nicole Milinaire, was one of the first women to attain a senior production role in a television series.

The series was the first American television adaptation of Doyle's stories, and the only such version until 2012's Elementary.

== Production ==
Sheldon Reynolds had been successful with his 1951 European-made series Foreign Intrigue (in 1956, he directed a film with the same title starring Robert Mitchum) and decided a Sherlock Holmes series made in France for the American syndication market might also be successful. Reynolds contacted the Doyle family and began his research into producing a Holmesian television series. Although only 39 episodes were made, a second season of 39 episodes was scheduled to begin production in June 1955. Many of the episodes were directed by Steve Previn, the brother of composer André Previn.

Reynolds also produced a second Sherlock Holmes TV series, entitled Sherlock Holmes and Doctor Watson (1979–1980). Many of the 1954 TV episodes were remade in the second series.

=== Casting ===
Reynolds desired to present the Holmes of A Study in Scarlet.

I was suddenly struck by the difference between the character in that book and that of the stage and screen. Here, Holmes was a young man in his thirties, human, gifted, and of a philosophic and scholastic bent, but subject to fateful mistakes which stemmed from his overeagerness and lack of experience.

In early stories like that one, Conan Doyle had not yet grown tired of his character, who later became a literary monster for him and, as literature, the earlier stories are far better. But practically every stage and screen presentation of the detective is based on the later stories.

Ronald Howard, then 36, was chosen to portray Sherlock Holmes. Howard shared Reynolds's view of Holmes and his portrayal was much more laid back than the more famous version portrayed by Basil Rathbone.

In my interpretation, Holmes is not an infallible, eagle-eyed, out-of-the-ordinary personality, but an exceptionally sincere young man trying to get ahead in his profession. Where Basil Rathbone's Holmes was nervous and highly-strung, mine has a more ascetic quality, is deliberate, very definitely unbohemian, and is underplayed for reality.

Howard Marion Crawford, credited as H. Marion Crawford, was cast as Watson and it was a role Crawford had long wanted to play. Crawford desired to play Watson as something other than the buffoon as typified by Nigel Bruce's portrayal.

I had never thought of Watson as the perennial brainless bungler who provided burlesque relief in the earlier portrayals. He is a normal man, solid on his feet, a medical student who gives valuable advice.... In other words, he is a perfect foil to Holmes' youthful buoyancy.

Scottish actor Archie Duncan was cast as Inspector Lestrade. Much akin to Dennis Hoey in the Rathbone/Bruce series of films, Duncan's Lestrade was used as comic relief.

Besides the three principals (Howard, Crawford and Duncan), a number of actors appeared regularly in the series, including Belgian-born Eugene Deckers, who played no fewer than seven different characters, including both victims and villains. Notable actors and actresses who appeared as guests included: Paulette Goddard ("The Case of Lady Beryl"), Delphine Seyrig ("The Mother Hubbard Case", "The Case of the Singing Violin"), Michael Gough ("The Case of the Perfect Husband"), Dawn Addams, Mary Sinclair, Natalie Schafer ("The Case of the Shy Ballerina"), and Charles Brodie ("The Case of the Texas Cowgirl", "The Case of the French Interpreter" and many others). John Buckmaster played character roles in two episodes ("The Case of the Haunted Gainsborough", "The Case of the Unlucky Gambler"), and Barry Mackay, whose career was nearing its end, also appeared in one episode ("The Case of the Laughing Mummy").

=== Filming ===
Several sets were built in Paris for the street outside 221B Baker Street and the flat itself, both of which were designed by Michael Weight, the same man who built the Festival of Britain 221B exhibit. There were a number of other sets built for a variety of locations and then redressed as necessary (houses, Scotland Yard, shops, parks, offices, etc.)

There was very little location work and most of the series was filmed in the studio with many stock shots of carriages on London Bridge and near Big Ben, giving the impression of London. However, on a few occasions, such as "The Case of the Eiffel Tower", the French filming locations were used. French actors were extensively used in small parts and several affected English accents with varying levels of success. Production was halted each day at exactly 4 o'clock for Duncan to spend fifteen minutes enjoying a special blend of tea he had shipped from London.

== Source material ==
Most of the show's 39 episodes are non-canonical original adventures, but a few are directly based on Arthur Conan Doyle's stories: "The Case of the French Interpreter" (based on "The Adventure of the Greek Interpreter"), "The Case of the Pennsylvania Gun" (based on The Valley of Fear), "The Case of the Shoeless Engineer" (based on "The Adventure of the Engineer's Thumb"), and "The Case of the Red-Headed League" (based on "The Red-Headed League"). The first episode, "The Case of the Cunningham Heritage", adapts the first section of A Study in Scarlet, in which Holmes and Watson's relationship is established, and develops an original story from there.

Several other episodes are identified by Alan Barnes in his book Sherlock Holmes On Screen: The Complete Film and TV History as being loosely inspired by other Doyle tales: "The Case of Lady Beryl" by "The Adventure of the Second Stain", "The Case of the Exhumed Client" by "The Adventure of the Devil's Foot", "The Case of the Diamond Tooth" by "The Adventure of the Speckled Band", "The Case of the Winthrop Legend" by "The Five Orange Pips", "The Case of the Violent Suitor" by "The Adventure of the Illustrious Client," and "The Case of the Christmas Pudding" by "The Adventure of the Empty House" and "The Adventure of the Mazarin Stone".

== Episodes ==
No.	Title	Directed by	Written by	Original release date
1	"The Case of the Cunningham Heritage"	Jack Gage	Sheldon Reynolds	18 October 1954
After his return from Afghanistan, Dr. Watson meets Sherlock Holmes and is recruited as his assistant. Together they investigate a murder, with a young lady as the prime suspect. Holmes finds the real murderer and learns his motive.
2	"The Case of Lady Beryl"	Jack Gage	Sheldon Reynolds	25 October 1954
Inspector Lestrade and Dr. Watson investigate a murder at the Beryl residence, but to their surprise get a confession from Lady Beryl, which Holmes does not credit. Holmes recreates the crime scene to expose the actual murderer.
3	"The Case of the Pennsylvania Gun"	Sheldon Reynolds	Sheldon Reynolds	1 November 1954
Watson and Holmes go to Sussex to investigate the gruesome death of Squire John Douglas; the weapon was a Pennsylvania sawn-off shotgun. Mr. Morell and Mrs. Douglas are suspected, but Holmes finds out John Douglas was not murdered. Based on The Valley of Fear.
4	"The Case of the Texas Cowgirl"	Steve Previn	Charles Early, Joseph Early	8 November 1954
Minnie O'Malley, a cowgirl in Bison Jack's visiting rodeo show, seeks help from Holmes to remove a dead body from her hotel room. Inspector Lestrade identifies it as a known thief, and Holmes unmasks the suspect.
5	"The Case of the Belligerent Ghost"	Sheldon Reynolds	Charles Early	15 November 1954
Dr. Watson claims to have been attacked by the ghost of Albert Higgins. Holmes finds a link to the theft of the Blue Madonna in the Pembroke museum, which has been exchanged for a forgery.
6	"The Case of the Shy Ballerina"	Sheldon Reynolds	Charles Early, Sheldon Reynolds	22 November 1954
Dr Watson's hat is found at the scene of a murder, leading Lestrade to suspect him of having killed a diplomat lately returned from Saint Petersburg. A Russian ballet dancer and a composer are also suspects, but Holmes unmasks the real murderer. Note: Natalie Schafer, known for her later TV role as Mrs. Howell in Gilligan's Island, plays the late diplomat's wife.
7	"The Case of the Winthrop Legend"	Jack Gage	Harold Jack Bloom, Sheldon Reynolds	29 November 1954
Harvey Winthrop asks Holmes to help him prevent his brother's potential death, but Holmes is unsuccessful in it and comes to suspect Harvey's fiancée.
8	"The Case of the Blind Man's Bluff"	Sheldon Reynolds	Lou Morheim, Sheldon Reynolds	6 December 1954
Holmes investigates murders, marked by the prior warning of a chicken claw, of those who had boarded the ship Gloria North.
9	"The Case of Harry Crocker"	Sheldon Reynolds	Harold Jack Bloom	13 December 1954
Escape artist Harry Crocker begs Holmes to help clear his name of a murder he didn't do, although clues seem to point to him. The murderer is revealed to have been jealous of the victim's relationship with Harry.
10	"The Mother Hubbard Case"	Jack Gage	Lou Morheim	20 December 1954
Holmes tries to seek Margaret Martini's fiancé in a story connected with seven other disappearances. Every man has been killed inside an empty house. Holmes uncovers the murderer's identity and motive.
11	"The Red-Headed League"	Sheldon Reynolds	Lou Morheim	27 December 1954
The story is a simplified version of "The Red-Headed League", but Wilson is a shop-owner instead of a pawnbroker.
12	"The Case of the Shoeless Engineer"	Steve Previn	Harold Jack Bloom	3 January 1955
The story follows that of "The Adventure of the Engineer's Thumb", but Hatherley loses a shoe rather than his thumb and escapes with the aid of the woman, Ruth Connors. Two co-conspirators are captured by Lestrade, with the assistance of Holmes.
13	"The Case of the Split Ticket"	Steve Previn	Lou Morheim	10 January 1955
A man asks Holmes to help him find his friend, Mr. Snow, to get the last piece of a sweepstake ticket. Mr. Snow is apparently killed, but Holmes uncovers a fraud.
14	"The Case of the French Interpreter"	Steve Previn	Lou Morheim	17 January 1955
A simplified version of "The Adventure of the Greek Interpreter", but the captive survives and Mycroft is not present.
15	"The Case of the Singing Violin"	Steve Previn	Kay Krausse	24 January 1955
Guy Durham, a rich tea and spice merchant, frightens his step-daughter Betty with ghostly violin music so that she can be declared insane and he can acquire her fortune. Holmes intervenes to prevent her murder and Lestrade arrests the perpetrator, who also murdered the girl's fiancé, James Winant.
16	"The Case of the Greystone Inscription"	Steve Previn	George Fass, Gertrude Fass	31 January 1955
Ms. Millicent requests Holmes to find her fiancé, missing from Greystone Castle. Holmes assists in finding the location of King Richard II's possessions and gets a family to surrender.
17	"The Case of the Laughing Mummy"	Sheldon Reynolds	Charles Early	7 February 1955
Holmes and Watson visit a country manor to see an ancient Egyptian mummy that allegedly makes strange laughing sounds, but Holmes deduces that the sound comes from elsewhere. Holmes further identifies the supposed mummy as the body of a latter-day archaeologist.
18	"The Case of the Thistle Killer"	Steve Previn	Charles Early, Joseph Early	14 February 1955
Lestrade is instructed to recruit Holmes to help find the Thistle Killer after the sixth murder. The police make preparations to catch the killer at Xerxes Park, where Holmes finds him in a surprising disguise.
19	"The Case of the Vanished Detective"	Steve Previn	Charles Early, Joseph Early	21 February 1955
Dr. Watson is worried at the long, unexplained absence of Holmes, and he persuades Lestrade to help locate him. Holmes was in fact working undercover as a shopkeeper in order to catch Carson, an escaped convict. The trail leads to retired judge Jeremiah Westlake, who had originally sentenced Carson.
20	"The Case of the Careless Suffragette"	Steve Previn	Charles Early, Joseph Early	28 February 1955
Holmes gets involved with a persistent suffragette, and an anarchist makes a bomb, which kills Pimpleton, a parliament official. Scotland Yard, guided by Holmes, finds the murderer.
21	"The Case of the Reluctant Carpenter"	Steve Previn	Sidney Morse, Sheldon Reynolds	7 March 1955
An arsonist/blackmailer, mistaking Lestrade for Holmes, threatens to continue a series of bombings unless he is paid thousands in extortion money. Using crude forensics, Holmes learns the site of the next bombing and removes the bomb from the Knightsbridge armoury with seconds to spare.
22	"The Case of the Deadly Prophecy"	Sheldon Reynolds	George Fass, Gertrude Fass	14 March 1955
Holmes investigates a school for boys to find a connection to the deaths of people that had been predicted by Anton, in a plot that involves hypnosis and blackmail.
23	"The Case of the Christmas Pudding"	Steve Previn	George Fass, Gertrude Fass	4 April 1955
John Norton, convicted of murder, swears vengeance on Holmes before his execution. Norton receives a Christmas pudding and escapes. After evading his revenge attempt, Holmes tries to find his accomplice.
24	"The Case of the Night Train Riddle"	Steve Previn	Lou Morheim	11 April 1955
Holmes and Dr. Watson search for a missing boy called Paul on the train they are travelling in. Paul had quarrelled with his father and decided to run away. Holmes is able to prevent Paul, being held for his father's fortune, from being killed.
25	"The Case of the Violent Suitor"	Steve Previn	Lou Morheim	18 April 1955
Alex Dougall comes to Holmes to help prevent a marriage between violent-tempered Jack Murdock and Susan Dearing, daughter of a murder victim. Holmes secures a confession and learns the identity of the murderer.
26	"The Case of the Baker Street Nursemaids"	Sheldon Reynolds	Sheldon Reynolds, Joseph Victor	25 April 1955
Holmes receives a baby from Mrs. Durant after her husband is kidnapped. Later, the baby is also kidnapped. Holmes and Dr. Watson manage to infiltrate the home of the culprit, who wants Mr. Durant's U-boat plans, and they rescue the Durant family.
27	"The Case of the Perfect Husband"	Steve Previn	Hamilton Keener	2 May 1955
Russell Partridge, a rich and respectable art collector, threatens to kill his wife at nine o'clock on their first wedding anniversary. She doesn't know if she believes him, and Lestrade doesn't either. Holmes takes the threat seriously and is able to thwart an attempt on her life. He also makes a gruesome discovery in a secret hiding place.
28	"The Case of the Jolly Hangman"	Steve Previn	Charles Early, Joseph Early	9 May 1955
Holmes investigates a suicide, which is shown to be a covered-up murder in Glasgow leading to a suspect who poses under another name. Before he can murder the victim's wife as well, Holmes shows up.
29	"The Case of the Imposter Mystery"	Steve Previn	Lou Morheim	19 May 1955
Holmes is blamed for faulty services which he didn't actually offer. To catch the imposter, Holmes and Dr. Watson go undercover as maharajas seeking security. Lestrade and his men chase, expose and arrest the imposter.
30	"The Case of the Eiffel Tower"	Steve Previn	Roger E. Garris	23 May 1955
Holmes, Lestrade and Dr. Watson follow a trail to the Eiffel Tower, crossing an espionage team who seek the coin they'd had but lost to a lady. Once they track the coin down, they provoke a riot to summon the police.
31	"The Case of the Exhumed Client"	Steve Previn	Charles Early, Joseph Early	30 May 1955
Holmes goes to a manor to investigate the murder of Sir Charles, presumably at the hands of an heir. In a story also involving a legend of the tower room, Holmes avoids death and keeps the occupants in suspense, then divulges the actual killer.
32	"The Case of the Impromptu Performance"	Steve Previn	Lou Morheim	6 June 1955
Holmes investigates the murder of Mrs. Brighton to prove her husband's innocence. With little time to lose, he and Dr. Watson quickly follow the trail to uncover the murderer.
33	"The Case of the Baker Street Bachelors"	Steve Previn	Roger E. Garris, Joseph Victor	20 June 1955
A politician named Jeffrey asks Holmes to clear his name from a fight he didn't take part in. Holmes and Dr. Watson go to the marriage bureau to bait a trap for their suspects, and reveals their blackmailing activities.
34	"The Case of the Royal Murder"	Steve Previn	Charles Early, Joseph Early	27 June 1955
Holmes and Watson, guests at the hunting lodge of an unnamed Central European king, witness a murder. They are able to expose the culprit and avoid a war.
35	"The Case of the Haunted Gainsborough"	Steve Previn	Charles Early, Joseph Early	4 July 1955
Mr. McGregor seeks Holmes's help in solving a mystery of an apparent ghost.
36	"The Case of the Neurotic Detective"	Steve Previn	Lou Morheim	11 July 1955
Multiple thefts have occurred without a trace of the perpetrator, and Holmes is becoming eccentric, while Dr. Watson becomes suspicious of his activities.
37	"The Case of the Unlucky Gambler"	Steve Previn	Lou Morheim	18 July 1955
A boy, Robert, asks Holmes to find his missing father, who had turned to gambling. Holmes gets the attention of a man named Jack Driscoll and tracks down the father, Mr. Fenech.
38	"The Case of the Diamond Tooth"	Sheldon Reynolds	George Fass, Gertrude Fass	19 September 1955
Lestrade investigates a murder — which, Holmes finds, has a link to a diamond tooth. Dr. Watson and Holmes search a shipping dock in disguise to meet the murderer, who had used a boa constrictor to kill Vagos.
39	"The Case of the Tyrant's Daughter"	Steve Previn	Roger E. Garris	17 October 1955
Holmes thoroughly investigates the apparent murder of Hammingway in order to save the life of the accused, Mr. Vernon, the fiancé of his step-daughter.

== Home media ==
In 2005, Mill Creek Entertainment released Sherlock Holmes: The Complete Series, a three-disc DVD set featuring all 39 episodes of the series. The set was described as "digitally remastered" but it is not digitally restored. The Mill Creek DVD releases feature short introductions and final commentaries for each disc by Christopher Lee, taken from the 1985 documentary The Many Faces of Sherlock Holmes. Also in 2005, Elstree Hill Entertainment released all 39 episodes as The Adventures of Sherlock Holmes on ten discs. In 2010, Mill Creek released Sherlock Holmes: Greatest Mysteries, a five-disc DVD set featuring all 39 episodes plus eight unrelated Holmes films: The Sign of Four (1932), A Study in Scarlet (1933), The Triumph of Sherlock Holmes (1935), Silver Blaze, also known as Murder at the Baskervilles (1937), Sherlock Holmes and the Secret Weapon (1943), The Woman in Green (1945), Terror by Night (1946), and Dressed to Kill (1946). On March 9, 2010, Allegro/Pop Flix released "Classic TV Sherlock Holmes Collection", a four-disc DVD set featuring all 39 episodes of the series. As of 2012, the series has been released on DVD by Mill Creek yet again, this time under the title of The Adventures of Sherlock Holmes.

In 2014 Tropics Entertainment released all 39 episodes on ten disc DVD set.

Also in 2014 RLJ Entertainment released the entire series on 2 DVDs titled "Best of Sherlock Holmes".

In 2017 it was released as a single disc Blu-ray release in Germany with original English language.

== Reception ==
When the series debuted, it was a hit. This Week declared "You won't want to miss this 4-star video event." Variety reviewed the series on October 20, 1954, and called the show "a winner that avoids the customary cliches that seem inevitable in any treatment of the Conan Doyle stories."

The series was voted Best New Mystery in the non-network film series division in Billboard's 3rd Annual TV Film Program and Talent Awards, based on an "all-industry vote".
