= Foreign Intrigue (film) =

1956 film

- Original film poster
- Directed by: Sheldon Reynolds
- Written by: Sheldon Reynolds
- Produced by: Sheldon Reynolds
- Starring: Robert Mitchum; Geneviève Page; Ingrid Thulin; Inga Tidblad
- Cinematography: Bertil Palmgren
- Edited by: Lennart Wallen
- Music by: Paul Durand
- Production companies: Sheldon Reynold Productions; Mandeville Productions
- Distributed by: United Artists
- Release date: May 28, 1956 (United States)
- Running time: 100 minutes
- Country: United States
- Languages: English; German; Swedish; French
- Box office: $1 million (US)

Foreign Intrigue is a 1956 American Eastmancolor film noir crime film starring Robert Mitchum. The film is written, produced and directed by Sheldon Reynolds, who had produced a television series called Foreign Intrigue in 1951.

Foreign Intrigue was one of the first major Hollywood films to be based on a popular TV series.

== Plot ==
One of the world’s richest men, Victor Danemore, dies suddenly of a heart attack at his palatial estate on the French Riviera. His secretary, Dave Bishop (Robert Mitchum), is repeatedly asked by a diverse cast of characters whether or not the man spoke any last words before dying. Though he did not, nobody seems satisfied with that answer.

Surprisingly, not even his young wife of seven years knows anything about her husband's background or how he earned his fortune. A mysterious letter that Danemore composed eight years earlier, just before exploding onto the international scene as a man of intrigue and immense wealth, piques Bishop to learn more about his employer's secret past.

Left behind in the custody of a Viennese attorney, it leads Bishop into a dangerous world of espionage and blackmail. The attorney is murdered before their appointed rendezvous, and the letter disappears.

Bishop soon discovers he’s gained a shadow, Spring, hired by a veiled figure to first follow then kill him. Consciousness - and cunning - at the first task, he postpones the second and instead proposes an alliance to double-cross his boss and share in riches to come.

Clues lead Bishop to Stockholm, then back to Vienna, where he learns that Danemore was one of numerous Quislings recruited by Adolf Hitler prior to World War II to serve as Gauleiters when Germany successfully invaded and conquered their countries.

In five cases - England, Sweden, Switzerland, Russia, and the United States - Germany failed to take power. Danemore had been the envoy arranged to aid in the conquest of Russia. He was blackmailing the other four collaborators by threatening to reveal their identities. The one in Sweden couldn’t stand it anymore and committed suicide, but his wife ardently continued the payments to protect her reputation.

Abducted by an envoy of Swiss counterintelligence, Bishop is enlisted by a quorum of representatives of the remaining three countries’ intelligence services to work on their behalf in revealing the names of their collaborators.

With a threatening widow - who’d stop at nothing to take her late husband’s place - detained by the intelligence faction, and the adoring, independent-willed daughter of the late Swedish kingpin waiting for him, Bishop departs with Spring for England to turn the tables on his employer.

== Cast ==
- Robert Mitchum as Dave Bishop
- Geneviève Page as Dominique Danemore
- Ingrid Thulin as Brita Lindquist (credited as Ingrid Tulean)
- Frédéric O'Brady as Jonathan Spring
- Eugene Deckers as Pierre Sandoz
- Inga Tidblad as Mrs. Lindquist
- Lauritz Falk as Jones
- Frederick Schrecker as Karl Mannheim
- John Padovano as Tony Forrest
- Georges Hubert as Dr. Thibault
- Peter Copley as Brown
- Lily Kann as blind housekeeper
- Ralph Brown as Smith
- Milo Sperber as Sergeant Baum
- Jim Gérald as cafe owner
- Jean Galland as Victor Danemore

== See also ==
- List of American films of 1956
