= Rout =

Panicked, disorderly retreat of troops from a battlefield

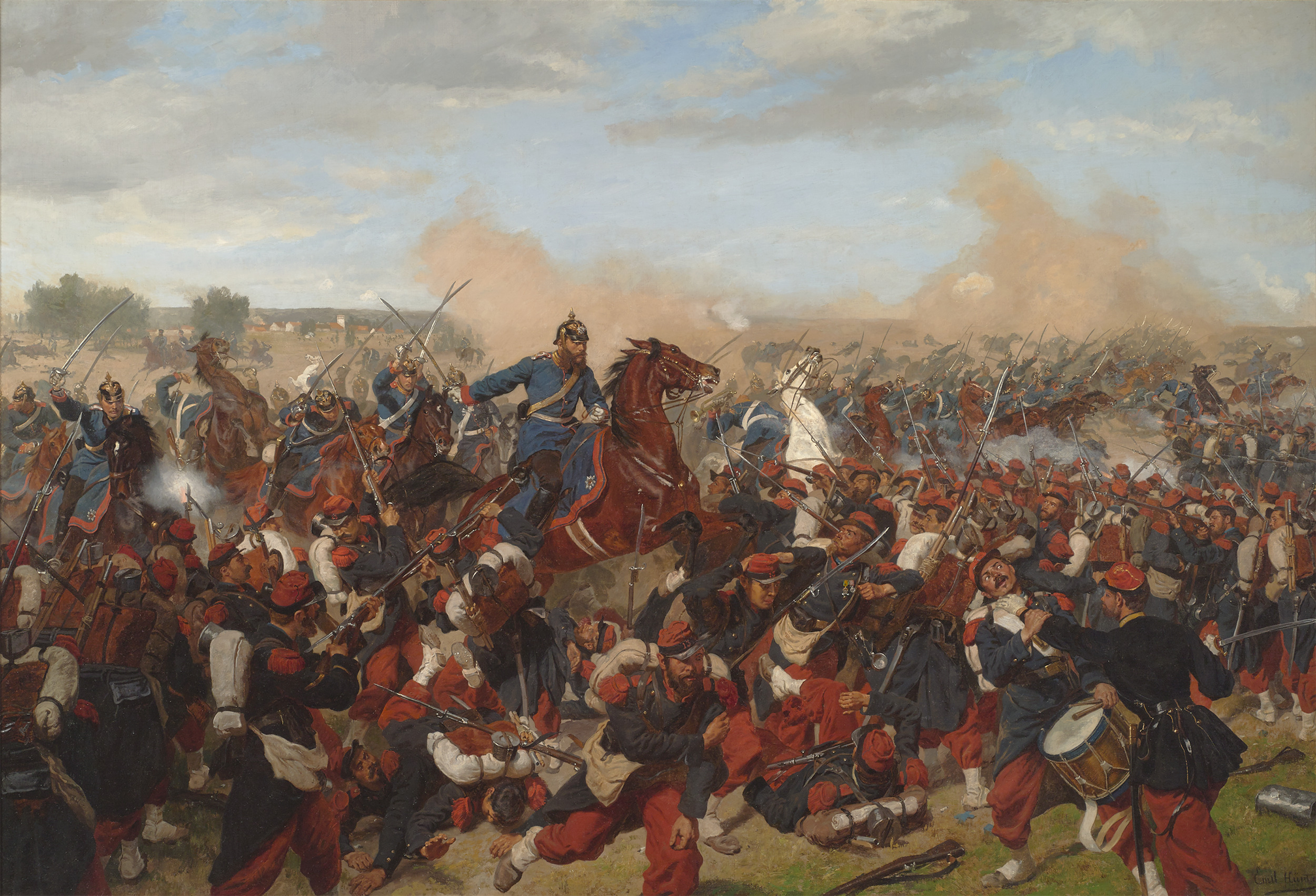
French troops routing during the Battle of Mars-la-Tour

A rout /raʊt/ is a panicked, disorderly and undisciplined retreat of troops from a battlefield, following a collapse in a given unit's command authority, unit cohesion and combat morale (esprit de corps).

== History ==
Off they went, one and all; off down the highway, over across fields towards the woods, anywhere, everywhere, to escape. The further they ran, the more frightened they grew. To enable them better to run, they threw away their blankets, knapsacks, canteens and finally muskets, cartridge-boxes and everything else. [...] We called to them, tried to tell them there was no danger, called them to stop, implored them to stand. We called them cowards, denounced them in the most offensive terms, put out our heavy revolvers and threatened to shoot them, but all in vain; a cruel, crazy, mad, hopeless panic possessed them, and communicated to everybody about in the front and rear. — US Rep. Albert G. Riddle (R-Ohio), observing the rout of the Army of Northeastern Virginia after the First Battle of Bull Run (July 21, 1861)

Historically, lightly equipped soldiers such as light cavalry, auxiliaries, partisans or militia were important when pursuing a fast-moving, defeated enemy force and could often keep up the pursuit into the following day, causing the routed army heavy casualties or total dissolution. The slower-moving heavy forces could then either seize objectives or pursue at leisure. However, with the advent of armoured warfare and blitzkrieg style operations, an enemy army could be kept more or less in a routed or disorganized state for days or weeks on end. In modern times, a routed formation will often cause a complete breakdown in the entire front, enabling the organized foe to attain a quick and decisive victory in the campaign. In the blitzkrieg warfare that characterized World War II, the French Army was decisively defeated in the Battle of Sedan (1940) opening a 20-kilometre (12 mi) gap in Allied lines into which Heinz Guderian poured his mechanized forces. German tanks kept the rout going, and the Allies were unable to stabilize the situation before the Wehrmacht occupied Paris and forced the capitulation of the French government.

== Tactics ==
Feigned routs are a type of military tactic which employ deception. It consists of retreating in order to entice enemy forces into pursuing the supposedly routed force with the intent of causing the enemy to abandon a strong defensive position or leading them into an ambush. The tactic carries with it the risk of a feigned rout turning into a real one.

The tactic of feigned routs have a long history of being used by military forces. Sun Tzu wrote in The Art of War: "Do not pursue an enemy who simulates flight." Feigned routs were used during several prominent battles fought during the period of classical antiquity, such as the Battle of Thermopylae and Battle of Agrigentum. During the Middle Ages, the Great Heathen Army used feigned routs, as did the Normans. The tactic continued to be used during the early modern period.

== Other uses of the term ==
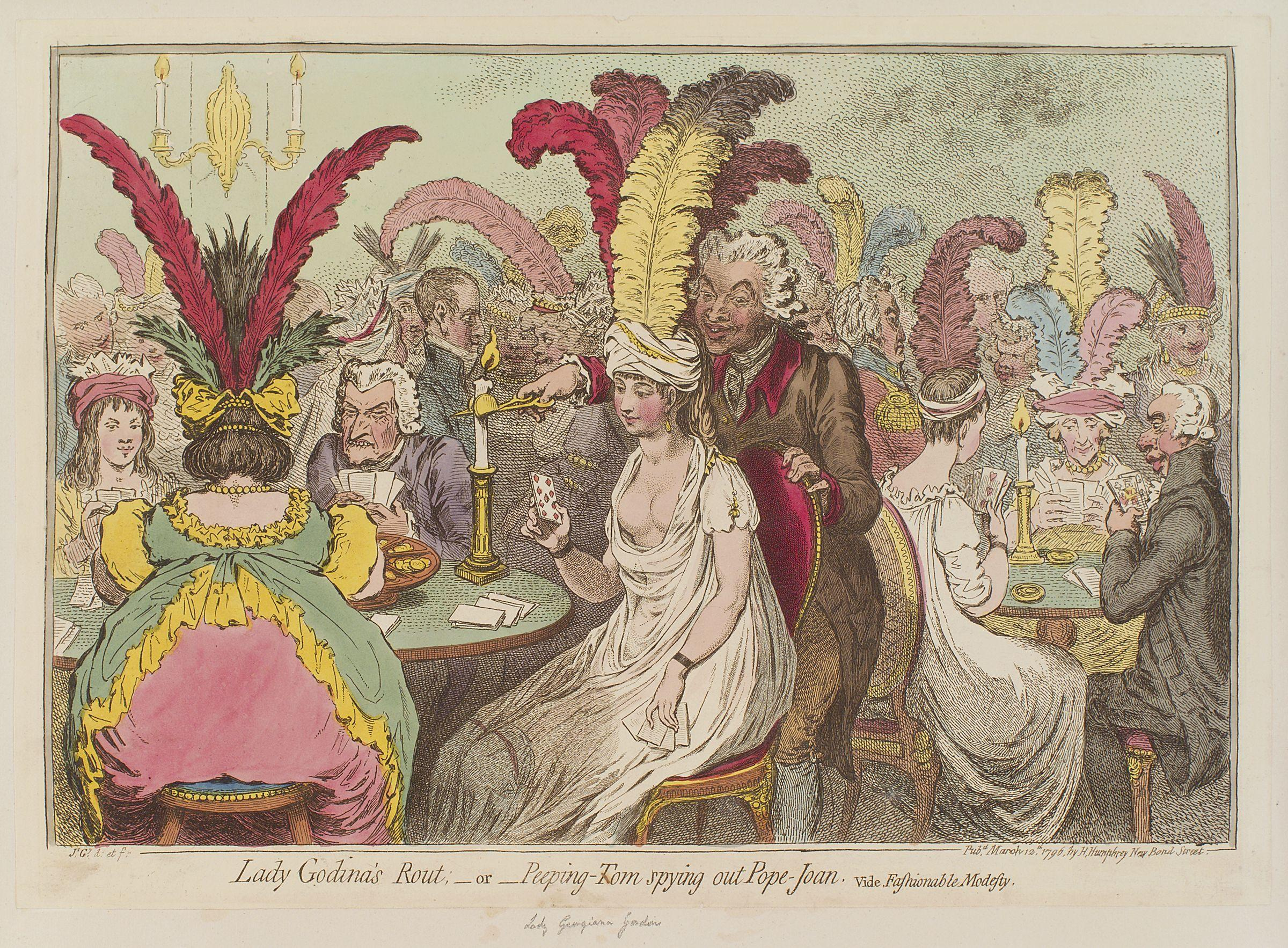
Lady Godina's rout; – or – Peeping-Tom spying out Pope-Joan, by James Gillray, 1796.

A "rout", or rout-party, was in Georgian England a relatively informal party given by the well off to which large numbers of people were invited. The term covered a variety of styles of event, but they tended to be basic, and a guest could not count on any music, food, drink, cards, or dancing being available, though any of them might be. "Rout-cake" was a particular type, mentioned by Jane Austen in Emma. Often, all there was to do was talk. James Gillray's caricature of 1796 shows Lady Georgiana Gordon (1781–1853, presumably "Lady Godina"), not yet Duchess of Bedford and indeed only about 16 at most, gambling at a game called Pope Joan, with the winning "Curse of Scotland" in her hand. At left is Albinia Hobart, Countess of Buckinghamshire, perhaps the hostess. She was famous for hosting gambling parties. Behind the card-tables is a tight crush of people.

The events sometimes became rather disorderly, and the name presumably originates as a metaphorical extension of the military term.

"Rout" is often used to mean "an overwhelming defeat" as well as "to put to disorderly retreat" or "to defeat utterly". It is often used in sports to describe a blowout.

In English common law, a rout is a disturbance of the public peace by three or more persons acting together in a manner that suggests an intention to riot although they do not carry out the inferred act. As a common law offence, it was abolished in England and Wales by the Public Order Act 1986.

Rout is personified as the eponymous deity in Homer's Iliad as the cowardly son of Ares.

"Rout" is also one of several collective nouns for a group of snails.

== See also ==
- Crowd psychology
