= R. J. Whitwell =

British medievalist (1859-1928)

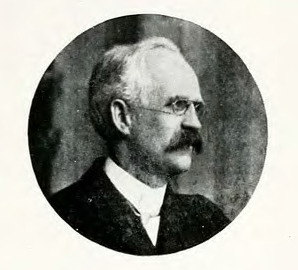
- Born: 31 August 1859; Kendal
- Died: 15 May 1928 (aged 68)
- Children: Louisa Russell, Duchess of Bedford
- Parent(s): Edward Whitwell

Robert Jowitt Whitwell B.Litt. (Kendal, Westmorland, 31 August 1859 – London, Middlesex, 15 May 1928) was a British medievalist and medieval who made significant contributions to lexicography.

== Personal ==
Robert Jowitt Whitwell was son of Edward Whitwell (2 May 1817 - 12 January 1893) and wife Mary Ann Jowitt (12 May 1819 - 17 October 1878), paternal grandson of Isaac Whitwell and wife Hannah Maria Fisher and maternal grandson of Robert Jowitt and wife Rachel Crewdson. The Whitwell family were based in Kendal, where Edward's brother John was the local MP from 1868 to 1880. In Glasgow, Lanarkshire, on 17 April 1884, Robert married Louisa Crommelin Brown (27 August 1860 - 29 January 1945), daughter of Colin Brown and wife Margaret Graham, with whom he had two daughters and one son. By 1898, they had moved to Oxford, Oxfordshire, where they lived at 70 Banbury Road, a few doors away from the editor of the OED. In 1914 their younger daughter, Louisa Crommelin Roberta Jowitt Whitwell, married Hastings Russell, the then Marquess of Tavistock, who had studied history at Oxford. Robert died in May 1928, and his wife Louisa died in January 1945.

== Academic ==
In his twenties, while he was still living in Kendal, Whitwell became a prolific voluntary contributor to the OED, submitting some 17,000 quotation slips between 1879 and 1884; by the time the first volume was published in 1888, his slip total was the 7th highest at 33,000. His academic life was, however, based at Oxford University, where he received a B.Litt. from Corpus Christi before becoming associated with New College. In 1901, he was Honorary Secretary of the Oxford Architectural and Historical Society, and in 1907 he was listed as a tutor in Modern History with colleagues including H. W. C. Davis, G. Baskerville, F. Madan, R. L. Poole, R. Rait, and A. L. Smith.

Whitwell made his greatest contribution to scholarship in 1913. Frustrated with the standard dictionary of medieval Latin, Du Cange's Glossarium (1678), he petitioned the British Academy to use the third 5-yearly International Congress of Historical Studies to propose "an adequate and complete dictionary of the language, based on the best authorities and compiled on modern scientific principles" with the collaboration of "historical scholars of all countries". The petition was signed by 82 British scholars, including the editors of the OED, and Whitwell was duly allowed to put the proposal to the first plenary session of the Congress, held in the Great Hall of Lincoln's Inn.

The American historian J. F. Jameson, reporting on the Congress, warned that the task that Whitwell envisaged "could not be hopefully undertaken with resources less formidable than those of the International Union of Academies". The First World War made cooperation on such a scale impossible, but it was indeed the IUA who revived Whitwell's suggestion in 1920, and by the time he died in May 1928 a coordinated effort from over ten countries was well under way. His death was noted with regret at the sixth 5-yearly International Congress of Historical Studies by Charles Johnson, who said that Whitwell "not only actively promoted the whole [international] scheme but was a zealous member of the committee [on British medieval Latin after 1066] and a generous contributor of excerpts."
