= Assignment to Kill =

1968 film by Sheldon Reynolds

- Theatrical release poster
- Directed by: Sheldon Reynolds
- Screenplay by: Sheldon Reynolds
- Produced by: William Conrad
- Starring: Patrick O'Neal; Joan Hackett; John Gielgud; Herbert Lom
- Cinematography: Enzo Barboni; Harold Lipstein
- Edited by: George R. Rohrs
- Music by: William Lava
- Production company: William Conrad Productions
- Distributed by: Warner Bros.-Seven Arts
- Release date: December 22, 1968
- Running time: 102 minutes
- Country: United States
- Language: English

Assignment to Kill is a 1968 American drama film in Technicolor and Panavision, directed by Sheldon Reynolds and starring Patrick O'Neal, Joan Hackett, John Gielgud, Herbert Lom, and Oskar Homolka.

== Plot ==
A private detective is hired by an insurance company to investigate a shipping tycoon who is suspected of deliberately sinking his own ships in order to claim the insurance money.

== Cast ==
- Patrick O'Neal as Richard Cutting
- Joan Hackett as Dominique Laurant
- John Gielgud as Curt Valayan
- Herbert Lom as Matt Wilson
- Eric Portman as Notary
- Peter van Eyck as Walter Green
- Oskar Homolka as Inspector Ruff
- Leon Greene as The Big Man
- Kent Smith as Mr. Eversley
- Philip Ober as Bohlen
- Ann Prentiss as Hotel Party Girl in Red Dress
