= Sherlock Holmes and Doctor Watson =

1979 TV series

- Title Card of the opening of the series
- Created by: Sheldon Reynolds
- Based on: The Sherlock Holmes stories by Sir Arthur Conan Doyle
- Starring: Geoffrey Whitehead; Donald Pickering; Patrick Newell
- Composers: Ervin Drake; Stanisław Syrewicz
- Original language: English
- No. of seasons: 1
- No. of episodes: 24

Production
- Producers: Sheldon Reynolds; Danilo Sabatini; Laura Fattori; Jacek Kraiński; Grzegorz Woźniak; Edward Szymański
- Production location: Poland
- Cinematography: Gábor Pogány
- Editor: Gabrio Astori
- Running time: 25 minutes
- Production companies: TVP Poltel; Sheldon Reynolds organization

Original release
- Release: 1979 – 1980

Related
- Sherlock Holmes

Sherlock Holmes and Doctor Watson is a television series created by Sheldon Reynolds and based on characters and storylines from Sir Arthur Conan Doyle's Sherlock Holmes stories. It starred Geoffrey Whitehead, Donald Pickering and Patrick Newell in the title roles of Sherlock Holmes, Doctor Watson and Inspector Lestrade respectively. The series is considered rather obscure, and was filmed on a relatively low budget in Poland. The series combined adaptations of Arthur Conan Doyle's source stories with original screenplays that saw Holmes face brand new cases.

Before the series finished production, British publisher Grandreams Ltd. prepared a printed, hard-cover volume titled Sherlock Holmes & Doctor Watson Annual, which adapted the show's storylines in comic book form, with Holmes, Watson and Lestrade drawn to the likenesses of Geoffrey Whitehead, Donald Pickering, and Patrick Newell. The volume was released in 1979, even though the series itself was not broadcast in the UK (where it was originally supposed to be distributed by ITV plc).

== Production ==
Sheldon Reynolds structured a deal with the state Polish Television to take over Poltel Studios to produce television shows. Anthony Burgess was brought on as a consultant. Reynolds recycled some aspects from his earlier 1954 television series starring Ronald Howard such as scripts and even the conceit of having Inspector Lestrade an equal co-star with Holmes and Watson.

Filming was done for low cost and co-star Pickering remarked: "The schedule for filming was very hectic and there were the odd dangerous moments. I remember once that the shafts of a hansom cab snapped when we were in hot pursuit of a suspect. That was very hairy!"

Most scenes of the episodes were filmed in Warsaw, as well as in the manors and palace buildings of Nieborów.

Many of the episodes were directly adapted from the original works of Arthur Conan Doyle or from Sheldon Reynolds's 1954 television series, with Reynolds credited with writing or co-writing several of them. Most of the episodes were directed by Reynolds and by various British television and film directors, including Roy Ward Baker and Val Guest.

The secondary cast included a number of British actors and actresses, who would occasionally play different characters in different episodes - for instance, Glynis Barber portrayed both the villainous Meredith Stanhope in the episode "The Case of the Three Uncles", and "Sophie" in "The Case of the Sitting Target". Numerous Polish actors were also cast in secondary roles throughout the series. Due to the accents, their characters were usually presented as originating from continental Europe; occasionally, English dubbing was used, notably in the case of a secondary role played in the episode "The Case of the Body in the Case" by the athlete Władysław Komar, who was often cast as an extra in Polish productions, due to his enormous size.

According to guest director Roy Ward Baker, as production wrapped up the head of Polish television, who had spearheaded the deal was arrested for corruption. The films were confiscated, leading to inconsistent distribution; the show was never released in the U.K. and aired on a single U.S. station in 1982. The then-president of Telewizja Polska, Maciej Szczepański, was charged with misuse of state funds after an audit in 1980; one of the charges concerned Sherlock Holmes and Doctor Watson, which the auditors claimed was assigned too high a budget, and resulted in financial loss. Szczepański himself stated that the charges against him were politically motivated, and had stemmed from conflicts inside the PZPR; he declared that Sherlock Holmes and Doctor Watson was one of the most profitable series to have ever been produced by Telewizja Polska, with distribution rights sold to 25 countries.

== Reception ==
The legal issues caused the series' release to be delayed, leading to the cancellation of its broadcast in several markets. Eventually, however, the series premiered on Polish TV, and was embraced by the viewers, leading to regular re-runs; it was also briefly parodied in an episode of the comedy series Alternatywy 4. After the political regime change of 1989, the series continued to be broadcast in Poland.

Sherlock Holmes and Doctor Watson was also broadcast in other countries, including Germany, where, dubbed in German, it premiered in 1982 on ZDF (with later broadcasts on other channels, including Sat.1), and was received positively as well. Geoffrey Whitehead's portrayal of Sherlock Holmes was particularly praised for its faithfulness to the character's original description by Arthur Conan Doyle, and the effortless switching between his different facets - the cold, emotionlessly objective and analytical detective, the refined Victorian gentleman, and the ruthless pursuer of criminals. The series' depiction of Doctor Watson was also noted: where many adaptations of Arthur Conan Doyle's stories tended to show Watson as little more than a sidekick, comic relief, or even a clownish buffoon, Donald Pickering's portrayal of Watson was faithful to Conan Doyle's description, and presented the character as an intelligent, composed and observant man, and Holmes's efficient and trusted partner. The fully orchestral score, composed by Ervin Drake and arranged and conducted by Stanisław Syrewicz, was praised for its rich atmosphere and Victorian ambience. Several local stations broadcast the series in 1982 in the United States as well, to positive reception; reviewer Peter Farrell of The Oregonian described the actors as "excellent", and stated: "This Holmes could easily be habit-forming".

== Episodes ==
No.	Title	Directed by	Written by
1	"A Motive for Murder"	Sheldon Reynolds	Sheldon Reynolds
Holmes is called upon to investigate the murder of wealthy businessman George Markham. Lestrade believes the perpetrator to be Markham's heir, which would lead him to arrest the deceased's niece. But did she really kill her uncle?
2	"The Case of the Speckled Band"	Sheldon Reynolds	Michael Allen
Holmes and Watson are asked by a Mrs. Langley to accompany her to Bavaria to visit her niece, who lives there with her stepfather, a count. The niece had a twin sister who mysteriously died "of fright" while in her locked room two months earlier, and she now fears the same fate. The prime suspect is the count, who stands to inherit a considerable fortune if his two stepdaughters can be eliminated. Holmes attempts to protect the niece, while at the same time trying to discover how her sister was killed. Based on The Adventure of the Speckled Band.
3	"Murder on a Midsummer's Eve"	Sheldon Reynolds	Michael Allen; Robin Bishop (as Adam Bishop)
Lord Warminster disappears following a violent argument with his lawyer, who is found murdered. With the police and the newspapers assuming Lord Warminster's guilt, Lady Warminster engages Holmes to establish the truth about the murder. Inspired in part by The Valley of Fear.
4	"Four Minus Four Is One"	Sheldon Reynolds	Robin Bishop (as Ian Bishop)
A young Egyptologist comes to see Holmes, fearing for his life. He explains that a year earlier he had unearthed a royal mummy on an expedition to Egypt. Two of the four members of the expedition have since died violent deaths, supposedly due to the mummy's curse. Holmes decides to investigate.
5	"The Case of the Perfect Crime"	Roy Stevens	Joe Morheim
An elusive master criminal is at work, stealing British state secrets and national treasures. Under pressure to solve the case, Lestrade seeks Holmes' help but Holmes states that he is too busy. Holmes' mysterious behaviour and a chance clue lead Watson to suspect that Holmes is in fact the criminal, and Watson sets out to prove it.
6	"The Case of Harry Rigby"	Val Guest	Sheldon Reynolds; Ray Allen
After Harry Rigby is released after serving three years in prison for bank robbery, his accomplices are found dead one after another. Lestrade suspects Rigby of wanting to eliminate them in order to avoid having to share the loot. The problem is that Lestrade also has his best men watching Rigby day and night in hopes of recovering the money, and this precludes Rigby having been able to kill them. Lestrade asks Holmes for help, but even Sherlock Holmes seems powerless to stop the killings.
7	"The Case of the Blind Man's Bluff"	Peter Sasdy	Lou Morheim; Robin Bishop
Two strange murders have been committed, with the perpetrator appearing to be blind and each victim being found in possession of a chicken claw with a black ribbon tied around it. Lestrade goes to Holmes for help with the case. Holmes recognises the chicken claw as a traditional voodoo death warning in Trinidad. A third murder takes place at the Kensington Marine Hospital, and Holmes determines that all of the victims had previously served together on the same cargo ship.
8	"A Case of High Security"	Roy Ward Baker	Robin Bishop
A disgruntled employee has taken control of a room in a top-secret government building and threatens to blow it up in an hour's time. Lestrade, having been brought in to deal with the situation but feeling overwhelmed, decides to call upon Holmes. With Holmes present, the case is further complicated when the employee is mysteriously murdered. Julian Fellowes plays a government bureaucrat.
9	"The Case of Harry Crocker"	Freddie Francis	Harold Jack Bloom; Robin Bishop
Lestrade arrests escape artist Harry Crocker for the murder of a young dancer he was involved with. Having escaped from the police thanks to his abilities, Crocker goes to see Holmes and asks him to investigate the affair and prove his innocence. Despite Lestrade's protests, Holmes takes the case.
10	"The Case of the Deadly Prophecy"	Freddie Francis	George Fass; Gertrude Fass
Holmes receives a letter from Marie Grande, a schoolteacher in a small town in Belgium, describing a string of strange deaths, one each month. On each occasion, a death prediction has been found written in chalk on the steps of the local church at the full moon - this is soon followed by the demise of the individual named, always of natural causes. Marie has discovered that Antoine, one of her students, writes the predictions while sleepwalking. Does Antoine have the gift of prophecy, or is a more sinister plot afoot? Holmes decides to find out.
11	"The Case of the Baker Street Nursemaids"	Val Guest	Joseph Victor
Britain and France are cooperating on the top-secret design for a submarine, and so Dr. Monteron, a French engineer, is working with the British Admiralty. After Dr. Monteron is kidnapped by a foreign power intent on getting information on the design, his wife sends their baby to Holmes for safekeeping. However, the baby ends up getting kidnapped as well, and soon Holmes and Watson must work to save the entire family, as well as state secrets.
12	"The Case of the Purloined Letter"	Val Guest	Sheldon Reynolds; George Fowler
Doctor Sergius, an unscrupulous foreign diplomat, has a compromising letter stolen from the safe of Lord Brompton in order to blackmail Brompton into recommending approval of a proposed treaty. Holmes suspects a notorious safe-cracker of having done the job, and decides to put psychological pressure on him in hopes of getting a confession naming Sergius as his employer. Inspired by Poe's The Purloined Letter.
13	"The Case of the Travelling Killer"	Val Guest	George Fowler
A London pawnbroker is shot dead in his shop at night, but nothing is stolen. Holmes believes the crime to be linked to similar crimes committed over the course of several years in different cities all over the world. Holmes manages to speak to a funambulist he noticed at the pawnshop, and she provides him with the clue which may enable him to solve the case.
14	"The Case of the Sitting Target"	Aurelio Crugnola	Sheldon Reynolds
After six years in prison for extortion and attempted murder, Peter Channing is released and shoots down one of the men who testified against him. But his primary target is Holmes, who was instrumental in bringing him to justice. Channing brazenly announces to Holmes that he plans to kill him and that he will enjoy seeing Holmes crack under the pressure. Thus begins a psychological contest between the two. Inspired in part by The Adventure of the Empty House.
15	"The Case of the Final Curtain"	Val Guest	Joe Morheim (as Joe Morhaim)
Theatre producer Edward Brighton, convicted of strangling his wife Phyllis, is only hours away from execution when he calls upon Sherlock Holmes. He tells Holmes of a new recollection about the evening of Phyllis' death: he had felt ill and, after getting some air, returned home to find an unidentified object not belonging to him before blacking out. With only this to go on, Holmes sets out to reconstruct the events of that fatal night.
16	"The Case of the Three Uncles"	Sheldon Reynolds	Michael Allen
A young woman tells Holmes and Watson that she fears for the life of her uncle, who runs the prosperous family steamship company. When her fears are justified and the uncle is found murdered, his brother takes over the running of the company. However, he soon dies from an apparent suicide. Lestrade suspects a third uncle, an avid gambler in desperate need of money, of murdering the other two. But Holmes and Watson are not convinced.
17	"The Case of the Body in the Case"	Roy Ward Baker	Tudor Gates
When a dead body is found in a case at Victoria station, Lestrade arrests John Courtney, the man who comes to collect it. Feeling certain of his innocence, the young man's fiancée comes to Holmes for help, and his subsequent investigation points not to Courtney but to his employer, the art dealer Hugo Verner (George Mikell).
18	"The Case of the Deadly Tower"	Roy Ward Baker	Joe Morheim (as Joe Morhaim)
Lord Tarlton, a wealthy believer in the occult, dies mysteriously while attempting to communicate with the spirit world. Following instructions given before the dead man's demise, his solicitor delivers a letter in which Holmes is asked to investigate. Any one of the five beneficiaries of Lord Tarlton's will may be a murderer. Catherine Schell guest stars as Lady Sylvia Tarlton.
19	"The Case of Smith & Smythe"	Roy Ward Baker	Sheldon Reynolds; Joe Morheim (as Joe Morhaim)
Herbert Smith and Hubert Smythe run competing tea shops located side-by-side, but the real source of their enmity is the romance between their children, Jane and John. Each man comes to Holmes stating that the other is trying to kill him, and is sent on to see Lestrade. Jane and John also come to Holmes seeking a way to mend things between their fathers. Holmes, Watson, and Lestrade all agree that something must be done, and each has a plan.
20	"The Case of the Luckless Gambler"	Roy Ward Baker	Joe Morheim (as Joe Morhaim)
Holmes is engaged by a young boy to find his father, a gambler who has been abducted after publicly stating that he feared for his life. Lestrade, having recovered the man's coat with a bullet hole in it, assumes he has been murdered. Holmes and Watson must delve into the underworld in order to discover the truth.
21	"The Case of the Shrunken Heads"	Val Guest	Tudor Gates
James McIntyre, a famous explorer, is kidnapped and a ransom note received from Mendoza, an old enemy of his. McIntyre's stepson Freddy delivers the ransom, Lestrade's plan being to apprehend the kidnapper immediately after the exchange. A man is shot attempting to flee with the ransom, but he is not Mendoza and the case he carries turns out to be empty. Holmes now suspects either Freddy or McIntyre himself of having staged the entire kidnapping, and sets out to discover the truth.
22	"The Case of Magruder's Millions"	Val Guest	Joe Morheim (as Joe Morhaim)
The immensely rich, wheelchair-using Malcolm Magruder invites Holmes and Watson to his country estate in order to investigate the death of an associate. However, a plot is afoot: members of Magruder's staff are replaced, Magruder himself is imprisoned in a room, and an imposter takes over. The fake Magruder plans to sell the entire estate and divide the proceeds among the conspirators. When Holmes and Watson arrive the conspirators attempt to get them to leave, but Holmes, sensing something is not right, insists on seeing "Magruder".
23	"The Case of the Other Ghost"	Val Guest	Tudor Gates
The ghost of Lord George Kindersley, murdered a century earlier, is rumoured to have taken revenge on various women of Kindersley Hall over the years. When a maid dies mysteriously, the butler asks Holmes to investigate, believing that "something evil", though not the ghost, is in the house. Since the current Lord Kindersley, Sir Charles, is unlikely to cooperate, Holmes enlists the help of Lestrade in order to make his investigation seem an official one. Events soon take an even more sinister turn.
24	"The Case of the Close-Knit Family"	Sheldon Reynolds	Andrea Reynolds
While gaslight and a new dumbwaiter are installed at their flat in Baker Street, Holmes and Watson stay at an elegant hotel. A ruby belonging to Lady Noell, one of the guests, is stolen while she sleeps by a mysterious cat burglar, but Holmes refuses to investigate. Lady Noell suggests that Watson take up the case instead which he does, while at the same time vying for the attentions of the lovely Miss Claire Ryland. Although another theft soon takes place despite his precautions, it seems that Watson, with some surreptitious help from Holmes, will solve the case.
