= Louisa Russell, Duchess of Bedford =

English noble (1893-1960)

Louisa Russell, Duchess of Bedford (Kendal, Westmorland, 27 March 1893 – 2 October 1960), formerly Louisa Crommelin Roberta Jowitt Whitwell, was an English noblewoman, the wife of Hastings Russell, 12th Duke of Bedford, and mother of the 13th Duke.

== Family, marriage and issue ==
She was the daughter of Robert Jowitt Whitwell and his wife Louisa Crommelin Brown. Jowitt was an academic based at New College, Oxford, and she met the future duke when he was an undergraduate at Balliol. They were married in London, Middlesex, on 21 November 1914, when he was still Marquess of Tavistock and heir to the dukedom. The couple had three children:

- John Ian Robert Russell, 13th Duke of Bedford (1917–2002), who married, first, Clare Gwendolen (née Bridgman) Hollway; second, Lydia Lyle, and third, Nicole Schneider. There were children from his first two marriages.
- Lady Daphne Crommelin Russell (1920-1991)
- Lord Hugh Hastings Russell (1923–2005), who married Rosemary Markby and had children.

== Biography ==
The Duke of Bedford was an Evangelical Christian who disapproved of drinking, smoking and gambling. Louisa described him as "the most cold, mean and conceited person" she had ever known. After their estrangement in the 1930s, she attempted to sue him for "restoration of conjugal rights", but the case was dismissed after causing a sensation in the press.

The duke was associated with Fascism and supported Oswald Mosley, but was also a pacifist; his younger son, Lord Hugh Russell, was a conscientious objector in the Second World War. The duke died in 1953 and was succeeded by his elder son John.
