= Jerome Thor =

American actor (1915–1993)

- Born: January 5, 1915; Brooklyn, New York, U.S.
- Died: August 12, 1993 (aged 78); Westwood, Los Angeles, California, U.S. U.S.
- Occupation: Actor
- Spouse: Synda Scott

Jerome Thor (January 5, 1915 — August 12, 1993) was an American actor of the stage and screen. He is best known for his work in Broadway plays from 1935 through 1946, and on American television during the 1950s. He starred as Robert Cannon in Foreign Intrigue; a role which popularized the trench coat-wearing detective in public consciousness. His costume is part of the collection at the Smithsonian Institution.

== Early life ==
Born in Brooklyn, New York, Thor began his career as a stage actor.

== Career ==
Thor made his Broadway debut in 1934 at the 46th Street Theatre in Emmet Lavery's The First Legion. He appeared in numerous Broadway plays through 1946, including Anton Chekhov's The Marriage Proposal, William Saroyan's Get Away Old Man, Joseph Fields and Jerome Chodorov's My Sister Eileen, Clifford Odets's Golden Boy, and Leonid Andreyev's He Who Gets Slapped.

Thor transitioned into working as a television actor in the late 1940s and early 1950s with guest roles on several American television anthology series, including Suspense and Studio One. His breakthrough role was as Robert Cannon in the 1950s TV series Foreign Intrigue in which he popularized the image of the trench coat-wearing detective. Filmed in Europe, the syndicated mystery program ran from 1951 through 1955. The trench coat he wore for the series is part of the permanent collection of the Smithsonian Institution. When James Daly replaced him on the program, the producers attributed the change to Thor's wanting more money. Thor said, "I didn't ask for all that money . . . I was tired of doing everything — helping direct, rewriting scripts, even carrying camera equipment."

He portrayed the recurring character of Art Delgado in Hill Street Blues in the early 1980s. Shore also periodically worked as a film actor, appearing in Riot in Juvenile Prison, 55 Days at Peking, Love and Bullets, St. Ives, House of the Black Death, and 10 to Midnight.

== Personal life ==
Thor was married to actress Synda Scott until his death. He died of a heart attack in Westwood, Los Angeles, on August 12, 1993, at the age of 78.

== Filmography ==
=== Film ===
Year	Title	Role	Notes
1959	Riot in Juvenile Prison	Paul A. Furman, M.D.	
1963	55 Days at Peking	Capt. Andy Marshall	
1971	House of the Black Death	Dr. Eric Campion	
1975	Mr. Sycamore	Higgins	
1976	St. Ives	Chasman	
1979	Love and Bullets	Senator	
1983	10 to Midnight	Medical Examiner	
1986	Murphy's Law	Judge Kellerman	
1988	Messenger of Death	Jimmy	
1989	Kinjite: Forbidden Subjects	Perverted Gentleman	

=== Television ===
Year	Title	Role	Notes
1948, 1949	Studio One	—	2 episodes
1950	Suspense	—	Episode: "Morning Boat to Africa"
1950	The Nash Airflyte Theater	—	Episode: "The Doll in the Pink Silk Dress"
1950–1951	Hands of Murder	—	3 episodes
1951	The Great Merlini	Great Merlini	Television film
1951	The Trap	—	Episode: "Errand for Noonan"
1951	Big Town	—	Episode: "Dangerous"
1951	The Web	—	3 episodes
1951–1953	Foreign Intrigue	Robert Cannon	63 episodes
1951–1953	Danger	—	4 episodes
1953	Medallion Theatre	—	Episode: "Contact with the West"
1955	Appointment with Adventure	—	Episode: "Forbidden Holiday"
1955	The United States Steel Hour	Walter Tillman	Episode: "Hung for a Sheep"
1955	Lux Video Theatre	Carey	Episode: "June Bride"
1956	The Philco Television Playhouse	—	Episode: "The Starlet"
1956	Goodyear Television Playhouse	—	Episode: "Starlet"
1956	The Alcoa Hour	Shaw	Episode: "Man on Fire"
1959	77 Sunset Strip	John Cosgrove	Episode: "Dark Vengeance"
1960	Hong Kong	Chet Bates	Episode: "The Jumping Dragon"
1961	Perry Mason	Walter Randell	Episode: "The Case of the Wintry Wife"
1961	The Barbara Stanwyck Show	Pete Bishop	Episode: "Along the Barbary Coast"
1961	The Deputy	Ben Meadows	Episode: "Tension Point"
1961	Checkmate	Mal Stryker	Episode: "Hot Wind on a Cold Town"
1965	The Man from U.N.C.L.E.	Norman	Episode: "The Arabian Affair"
1966	Daniel Boone	Samuel Thurston	Episode: "The Accused"
1969	Adam-12	Milton Prendle	Episode: "The Things You Do for the Job"
1969	It Takes a Thief	Saunders	Episode: "Rock-Bye, Bye, Baby"
1969	The F.B.I.	Layton Simms	Episode: "Silent Partner"
1971	O'Hara, U.S. Treasury	Marty Baron	—
1973	Incident on a Dark Street	Abe Hirsch	Television film
1974	Planet of the Apes	Proto	Episode: "Escape from Tomorrow"
1976	The Great Houdini	Conductor	Television film
1976	Stalk the Wild Child	Menzies	Television film
1977	The Amazing Howard Hughes	Counsel	Television film
1977	Murder in Peyton Place	Manager	Television film
1977	Quincy, M.E.	Lynch	Episode: "Death Casts a Vote"
1980	CHiPs	Businessman	Episode: "Nightingale"
1982	Hill Street Blues	Delgado	2 episodes
1985	Highway to Heaven	Dr. Gottlieb	2 episodes
1986	You Again?	Richard Wendell	Episode: "Marry Me a Little"
