= Dick and the Duchess =

American TV situation comedy (1957–1958)

- Genre: Sitcom
- Created by: Sheldon Reynolds
- Starring: Patrick O'Neal; Hazel Court
- No. of seasons: 1
- No. of episodes: 26

Production
- Executive producer: Nicole Russell
- Production locations: MGM-British Studios, Borehamwood
- Running time: 30 minutes

Original release
- Network: CBS
- Release: September 28, 1957 – May 16, 1958

Dick and the Duchess is an American television situation comedy that was broadcast on CBS from September 28, 1957, to May 16, 1958. It was "one of the earliest of filmed television shows in the UK". A dubbed version of the series was also shown in Germany.

== Premise ==
A multinational insurance company stationed American Dick Starrett in London as an investigator and adjuster. His wife, Jane, was the daughter of an English earl, and her family was "less than enchanted with her marriage to a commoner — and an American at that." Jane felt that she "had been 'Americanized' by movie and television crime stories" enough to be a detective, so she often tried to help with Dick's investigations, but she usually caused problems by doing so. Peter Jamison worked with Dick and was his friend. Dick's investigations often led to his working with Inspector Stark of Scotland Yard. Rodney was another employee in Dick's office. Mathilda was the Starretts' housekeeper.

== Cast ==
- Patrick O'Neal as Dick Starrett
- Hazel Court as Jane Starrett
- Richard Wattis as Peter Jamison
- Michael Shepley as Inspector Stark
- Ronnie Stevens as Rodney
- Beatrice Varley as Mathilda

=== Guest stars ===
- Margaret Rutherford as Cynthia Gordon

== Archive ==
The Paley Center for Media holds several episodes of Dick and the Duchess. They include "The Swedish Story" and "An American".

== Production ==
Created by Sheldon Reynolds, Dick and the Duchess was filmed at MGM-British Studios in Borehamwood, near London. Twenty-six episodes were made with a laugh track. Sound editor Robert Winter wrote that in early stages of production he, Reynolds, and the first two episodes' writers spent much time in discussing "what was or was not funny to a British audience, as well as the important criteria for an American audience for whom it was principally made." They felt that use of a laugh track would prompt laughter among viewers, and Winter used recordings of "some 30 odd different kinds of laughter" to create the background track.

Nicole Milinaire was the program's executive producer, and Reynolds was the producer. Reynolds also directed and wrote for the series. Other directors included Gerald Bryant, Allan Davis, Henry Kaplan, and McLean Rogers. Other writers included Ray Allen, Harvey Bullock, Dennis Freeman, and Robert Shannon.

Dick and the Duchess was initially broadcast on Saturdays from 8:30 to 9 p.m. Eastern Time. In March 1958 it was moved to Fridays from 7:30 to 8 p.m. E. T. Its initial competition included Ozark Jubilee on ABC and The Perry Como Show on NBC. After the change in schedule, it competed with The Adventures of Rin-Tin-Tin on ABC and Truth or Consequences on NBC.

The trade publication Billboard reported in December 1957, "The program has improved slightly, but indications are that it doesn't really have the all-around appeal to make it with American audiences." When Helene Curtis Industries, Inc. and Mogen David ended their sponsorships, plans called for the series to end on March 22, 1958. CBS, however, decided to move it to the Friday time slot and show reruns for at least eight weeks.

== Critical response ==
Jack Gould wrote in The New York Times, "Despite the novelty of its London setting, Dick and the Duchess ... is only another situation comedy." Gould wrote that Court "displayed an engaging vivacity as the English wife; Patrick O'Neal was a routine American husband." He also said the plot of the premiere episode was improbable and noted "the usual cheap jokes at the expense of Britons who speak differently from Americans.

A review in the trade publication Variety praised the pacing and production values of the November 3, 1957, episode. It said that Court's and O'Neal's performances were competent, but overall the episode produced fewer laughs than those heard in the laugh track. The review said that the fault lay with "lack of freshness" in the script and its cliches.

Bill Weber wrote in TV-Radio Life that Dick and the Duchess had "a spritely gaiety and saucy innuendo seldom seen in an American production." Weber attributed that accomplishment to O'Neal, Court, and "even more importantly, deft writing and direction." He complimented the casting and noted that the show's "wit is unmistakably British in the crisply turned phrase, the bon mot."

A review in the trade publication Broadcasting called Dick and the Duchess " an intriguing mixture of British and American whimsey" and said that it "combines the best of situation comedy and whodunit". It complimented the quality of the show's production except for the "out of step" laugh track.

== German broadcasts ==
The ZDF network broadcast the series in Germany. Winter and translators worked for five months to create German versions of episodes that could sustain (along with the use of a laugh track) the humor of "most of what was considered funny in the English language".
