= Nicole Russell, Duchess of Bedford =

French television producer

Her Grace The Dowager Duchess of Bedford
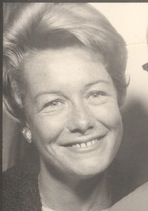
- Russell in 1976
- Born: Nicole Marie Charlotte Pierrette Jeanne Schneider; 29 June 1920; Paris, France
- Died: 6 September 2012 (aged 92); Princess Grace Hospital Centre, Monaco
- Occupation: Author
- Spouses: Henri Milinaire (m. 1938; div. 1956) Ian Russell, 13th Duke of Bedford (m. 1960; died 2002)
- Children: 4, including Caterine
- Parent(s): Paul Schneider; Marguerite Durand

Nicole Russell, Duchess of Bedford (née Schneider; 29 June 1920 – 6 September 2012) was one of the first female television producers in France. After becoming the Duchess of Bedford, she helped to open and popularize one of the first Stately homes to the public - Woburn Abbey. She was also a best-selling author.

== Biography ==
Nicole Schneider was the eldest child of Capt. Paul Schneider, a World War I flying Ace, and Marguerite Durand, of the noble Crouzet de Rayssac (or Raissac) des Roches family on her mother's side. Shortly after turning eighteen years old, her parents told her she would be married that December to Henri Milinaire, a painter 14 years older than herself whose family owned steelworks in France. With Henri she became the mother of four children: Didier Milinaire, Caterine Milinaire, Gilles Milinaire, Agnès Milinaire and three grandchildren: Serafine Klarwein, Galaad Milinaire and Thea Milinaire.

Nicole Milinaire became a French television producer in the 1950s. She was the associate producer of Sheldon Reynolds television series Sherlock Holmes and of the 1951–1954 series, Foreign Intrigue. She produced the 1957 CBS series Dick and the Duchess, starring Patrick O'Neal and Hazel Court. Nicole also hosted a program on Monte Carlo Television, topics included extrasensory perception and Sir Arthur Conan Doyle with guest Prince Frederick Joseph of Naples.

In 1960 she married John Russell, 13th Duke of Bedford. It was his third and her second marriage; it lasted until his death in 2002 and saw the couple's usual home as Château des Ligures, 2 rue Honoré Labande, Monte Carlo.

Nicole, (Dowager) Duchess of Bedford died on 6 September 2012 at the age of 92.

== Bibliography ==
- "Nicole Nobody : The Autobiography of the Duchess of Bedford" by Nicole Russell. ISBN 0-385-09773-5. Doubleday and Company, Inc., Garden City, NY (1974)
- "Le Joyeux Fantôme" by the Duchess of Bedford, illustrated by [Danièle Bour]. Grasset Jeunesse, Paris (1976)
- "Superwoman : Comment avoir le maximum d'efficacité avec le minimum d'effort" by the Duchess of Bedford and Shirley Conran. ISBN 2-246-00542-6. Bernard Grasset, Paris (1977)
