= Caterine Milinaire =

French journalist, photographer and author

- Born: 1942 (age 83–84); Paris, France
- Occupations: Journalist, photographer, author
- Parent(s): Henri Milinaire; Nicole Russell, Duchess of Bedford

Caterine Milinaire (born in 1942, Paris, France) is a journalist, photographer, and author. She was educated in Paris and in England.

Millinaire is the daughter of Henri and Nicole Milinaire (nee Schneider), later Duchess of Bedford.

Her professional life began in London as a journalist for Queen Magazine. In 1965, she moved to New York City to work for Vogue Magazine as a writer, photographer, and youth fashion editor.

Her photographs and articles have appeared in: Conde Nast Publications, New York Magazine, People, Rolling Stone and Interview, as well as in various international publications such as the Sunday Telegraph Magazine.

Since 1976, Milinaire has continued working in the United States as a freelance photographer for the Sygma News agency; now a part of Bill Gates' Corbis archives. Milinaire is the author of three books published by Harmony Books, Crown Publishers, a division of Random House: Birth (1974), Cheap Chic (1975) and Celebrations (1981).

Milinaire continues to work principally in the visual fields of photography, video and mixed media. In 2012, she published a children's book: Liana, the Wandering Vine.

She was married to Frederick Ames Cushing (1934–2013) of Newport, Rhode Island, with whom she formed TellTales - a video production company.

Caterine Milinaire has one daughter, Serafine (b.1971), with artist Mati Klarwein.

== Works ==
- Milinaire, Caterine. Birth. New York: Harmony Books. (1974)
- Milinaire, Caterine and Carol Troy. Cheap Chic. New York: Harmony Books. (1975)
- Milinaire, Caterine and Carol Troy. Cheap Chic Update. New York: Harmony Books. (1978)
- Milinaire, Caterine. Celebrations. New York: Harmony Books. (1981)
- Milinaire, Caterine. Birth : The book that changed how women and men have babies. Revised and updated. New York: Harmony Books. (1987)
- Milinaire, Caterine. Liana, the Wandering Vine. Createspace. (2013)
