= Love and Bullets (1979 film) =

1979 film by Stuart Rosenberg

- Theatrical release poster
- Directed by: Stuart Rosenberg
- Written by: Wendell Mayes; John Melson
- Produced by: Pancho Kohner
- Starring: Charles Bronson; Jill Ireland; Rod Steiger
- Cinematography: Fred J. Koenekamp; Anthony B. Richmond
- Edited by: Michael F. Anderson
- Music by: Lalo Schifrin
- Production company: ITC Entertainment
- Distributed by: Associated Film Distribution
- Release dates: 27 August 1979 (United Kingdom); 14 September 1979 (New York City); 9 December 1979 (United States)
- Running time: 104 minutes
- Countries: United Kingdom; United States
- Language: English
- Budget: $8 million

Love and Bullets is a 1979 action crime film directed by Stuart Rosenberg. and starring Charles Bronson, it is based on a screenplay by Wendell Mayes and John Melson.

The film was originally to have been directed by John Huston and advertisements were taken out in Variety to promote this fact. Huston apparently did film some scenes but walked off the set after disagreements with the producers. Veteran director Rosenberg stepped in on the troubled production. The resulting movie received almost-unanimously poor reviews.

== Plot ==
Phoenix Police Detective Charlie Congers is tasked to assist the FBI in bringing a gangster's girlfriend, Jackie Pruitt, back to the USA to testify. The FBI thinks she can give incriminating information to law enforcement that will put Joe Bomposa behind bars for life.

It turns out that Pruitt doesn't know much of anything useful to the FBI. The trouble is, Bomposa is forced by his mafia peers to have her "whacked" anyway, at the exorbitant cost of $1 million, for a vicious, amoral, disloyal, Italian hitman.

While Congers is falling in love with her, Pruitt is shot as she embraces Congers, before she leaves for the US under the protection of the FBI. Bomposa arranges to have the Italian hitman killed for overcharging him. Congers delivers a casket, flowers, a foreboding note "Love and bullets, Charlie" and a bomb to Bamposa's mansion, which kills the Don and his mafia lieutenants.

== Cast ==
- Charles Bronson as Detective Charlie Congers
- Jill Ireland as Jackie Pruitt
- Rod Steiger as Joe Bomposa
- Henry Silva as Vittorio Farroni
- Strother Martin as Louis Monk
- Bradford Dillman as Jim Brickman
- Michael V. Gazzo as Lobo
- Paul Koslo as Huntz
- Val Avery as Caruso
- Sam Chew Jr. as Sam Cook (credited as Sam Chew)
- Billy Gray as Durant (credited as William Gray)
- Jerome Thor as Senator
- Joseph Roman as Coroner
- Sidney Kean as Machonni
- Albert Salmi as Andy Minton
- John Hallam as Cerutti
- Andy Romano as Marty
- Lorraine Chase as Vittorio's Girlfriend

== Production ==
In 1977 it was announced that John Huston would direct Charles Bronson and Jill Ireland in Love and Bullets from a script by Wendell Mayes, who had written Bronson's hit film Death Wish. Finance would come from Lew Grade's ITC Entertainment. It was part of a $97 million slate of movies Grade was making which also included The Legend of the Lone Ranger, Movie Movie (then called Double Feature), The Boys from Brazil, Raise the Titanic, The Golden Gate from the Alistair MacLean novel (never made), Escape to Athena, The Muppet Movie and Road to the Fountain of Youth with Bing Crosby and Bob Hope (which was never made). Filming on Love and Bullets - then called Love and Bullets, Charlie - was to begin in Managua, Nicaragua on 3 November 1977. By this stage Huston had fallen ill and been replaced as director by Stuart Rosenberg.

Wendell Mayes later recalled:

I wrote a very tricky script in flashback: A man was hired to bring a gangster's moll from Switzerland back to the States, where she would confess to certain things, implicating certain gangsters. She was killed en route. The man hired to bring her back realizes, through some clue, that maybe the gangsters didn't kill her. Somebody else might have done it. So he sets out to retrace his steps. Now, in retracing his steps, someone is trying to kill him, while in flashback, what has already happened takes place in continuos action; so what you had was a continuous action, past and present. A very interesting concept.

Mayes said that Huston liked the script but that the director who replaced him wanted changes that Mayes was opposed to so another writer was put on it. "The idea of the flashback and the double action was gone; and what audiences saw, although my name is on it for story and as screenwriter, is half of what it was."

== Reception ==
=== Critical response ===
Roger Ebert of the Chicago Sun-Times gave the film one-and-a-half stars out of four and wrote, "Love and Bullets is a hopelessly confused hodgepodge of chases, killings, enigmatic meetings and separations, and insufferably overacted scenes by Steiger alternating with alarmingly underacted scenes by Bronson...It's all texture and no plot, which is fine for a travelog but not so hot for a thriller. There's so little dialog we begin to suspect that's deliberate: Has the wordage in this movie been kept to a minimum to make it easier to dub for the international market?" Janet Maslin of The New York Times wrote, "The British-born Miss Ireland has no luck in affecting a hillbilly accent, and as a comic pretense she's simply not there. However, she and Mr. Bronson approach each other with an appealing ease, which would be more appealing if it were not the movie's only selling point. Mr. Bronson grows ever more coolly dependable with each new film, but 'Love and Bullets' is too clumsy to show him off to much advantage". A review in Variety reported, "There are hints throughout of sharper characterizations and less superficial relationships, but these are hampered by unambitious dialog and repeatedly trite situations". Gene Siskel of the Chicago Tribune gave the film two stars out of four and called it "a dull, dull chase film" that "works only as a travelog for Swiss ski resorts, and it would have been improved vastly if it contained subtitles identifying the fancy lodges Bronson and Ireland occupy". Kevin Thomas of the Los Angeles Times called the film "an instance of the familiar made diverting through some decent writing, taut direction and solid principal performances by Charles Bronson, Jill Ireland and Rod Steiger". Richard Combs of The Monthly Film Bulletin wrote, "Love and Bullets may not be the worst, but it is a relatively dismaying example of the Lew Grade entertainment formula: as locations, production values and clichéd set-pieces proliferate, scripts increasingly look like shaggy-dog stories desperately in search of a point, and actors are left to do their own thing as their characters disintegrate".

== See also ==
- List of American films of 1979
