= Katherine Woodville, Duchess of Buckingham =

English noblewoman (c. 1458–1497)

Katherine Woodville
- Duchess of Buckingham; Duchess of Bedford; Countess of Pembroke
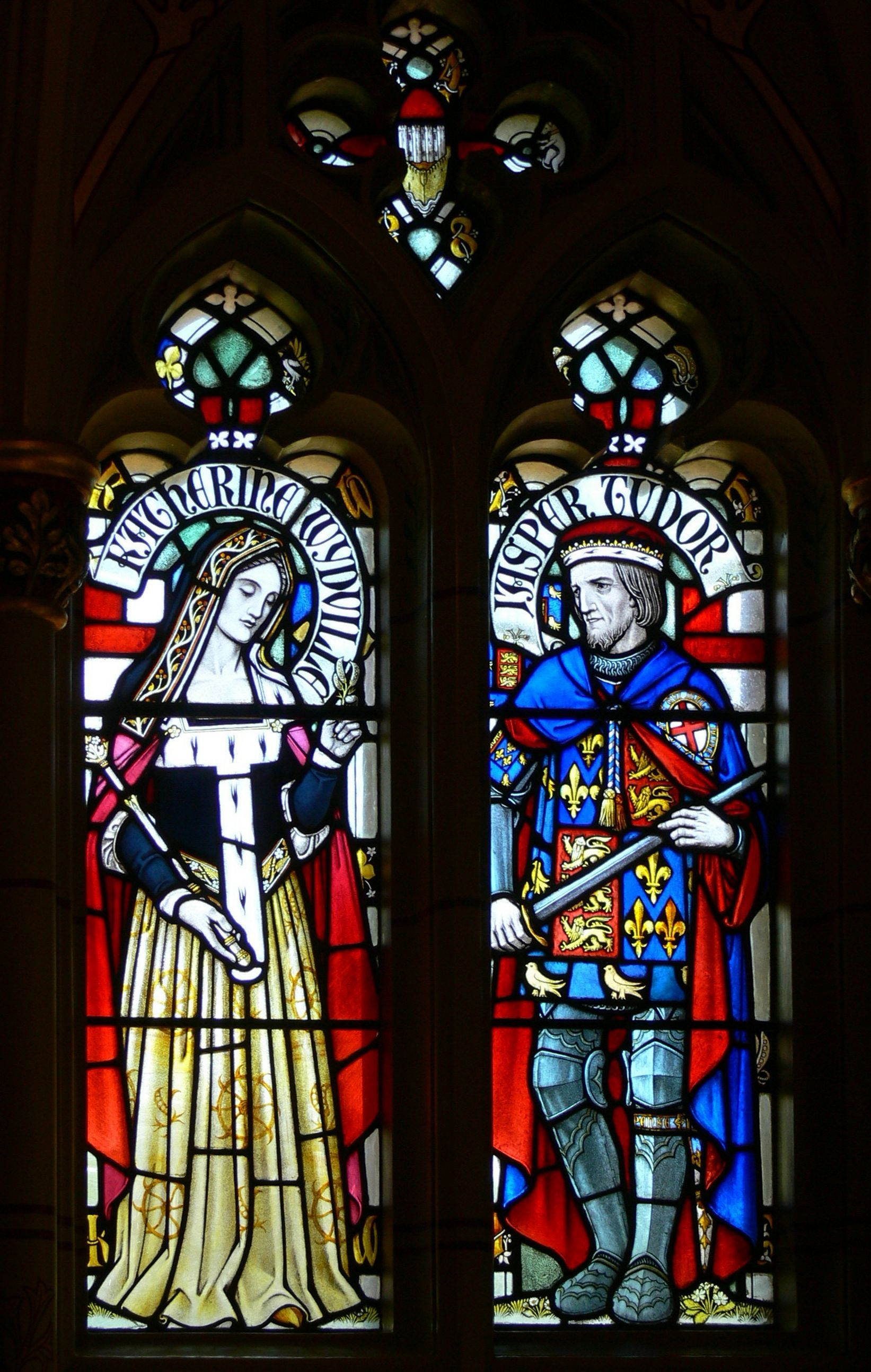
- Katherine with her second husband Jasper Tudor on stained glass windows in Cardiff Castle
- Born: c. 1458; Grafton Regis, Northamptonshire, England
- Died: 18 May 1497 (aged 38–39)
- Noble family: Woodville
- Spouse: Henry Stafford, 2nd Duke of Buckingham (m. 1465; died 1483) Jasper Tudor, 1st Duke of Bedford (m. 1485; died 1495) Sir Richard Wingfield (m. 1496)
- Issue: Edward Stafford, 3rd Duke of Buckingham; Elizabeth Stafford, Countess of Sussex; Henry Stafford, 1st Earl of Wiltshire; Anne Stafford, Countess of Huntingdon
- Father: Richard Woodville, 1st Earl Rivers
- Mother: Jacquetta of Luxembourg

Katherine Woodville (also spelt Catherine Wydville, Wydeville, or Widvile (Note: Although spelling of the family name is usually modernised to "Woodville", it was spelled "Wydeville" in contemporary publications by Caxton and her tomb at St George's Chapel, Windsor Castle is inscribed thus; "Edward IV and his Queen Elizabeth Widvile".)) (c. 1458 – 18 May 1497) was an English noblewoman. She was the youngest child of Richard Woodville, 1st Earl Rivers and Jacquetta of Luxembourg, and a sister of queen consort Elizabeth Woodville. Through her marriages to Henry Stafford, 2nd Duke of Buckingham and Jasper Tudor, Duke of Bedford, she was Duchess of Buckingham and Bedford.

== Early life ==
Katherine was the daughter of Richard Woodville, 1st Earl Rivers, and Jacquetta of Luxembourg. When her sister Elizabeth married Edward IV of England, the King elevated and promoted many members of the Woodville family. Elizabeth Woodville's household records for 1466/67 indicate that Katherine was being raised in the queen's household.

== First marriage ==
Sometime before the coronation of Elizabeth in May 1465, Katherine was married to Henry Stafford, 2nd Duke of Buckingham; both were still children. A contemporary description of Elizabeth Woodville's coronation relates that Katherine and her husband were carried on squires' shoulders due to their youth. According to Dominic Mancini, Buckingham resented his marriage to a woman of inferior birth; though Katherine's sister Elizabeth had married the King of England. However, the couple had four children:

- Edward Stafford, 3rd Duke of Buckingham (3 February 1478 – 17 May 1521)
- Elizabeth Stafford, Countess of Sussex (c. 1479 – 11 May 1532)
- Henry Stafford, 1st Earl of Wiltshire (c. 1479 – 6 April 1523)
- Anne Stafford, Countess of Huntingdon (c. 1483 – 1544)

In 1483, Buckingham first allied himself to the Duke of Gloucester, helping him succeed to the throne as King Richard III, and then to Henry Tudor, leading an unsuccessful rebellion in his name. Buckingham was executed for treason on 2 November 1483.

== Second marriage ==
After Richard III was defeated by Henry Tudor at the Battle of Bosworth in 1485, Katherine married the new king's uncle Jasper Tudor on 7 November 1485 who was about 25 years older than her.

== Third marriage ==
After Jasper's death on 21 December 1495 at Thornbury Castle where they were living, Katherine married – not later than 24 February 1496 – Sir Richard Wingfield, who was twelve years younger than Katherine and who outlived her. After Katherine's first two marriages having been arranged, it's thought her final marriage was one for love, especially as it took place about eight weeks after the death of her second husband. Her third marriage took place without licence and the couple were fined £20. It is thought her elder son, Edward Stafford, paid his mother's fine.

== Depiction in fiction ==
Katherine is the main protagonist in Susan Higginbotham's 2010 historical novel The Stolen Crown. She is briefly mentioned in Philippa Gregory's historical novels The White Queen (2009), The Red Queen (2010), and The White Princess (2013).

== Sources ==
- Gregory, Philippa; Baldwin, David; Jones, Michael (2013). The Women of the Cousins' War: The Duchess, the Queen, and the King's Mother. Atria.
- Jones, Michael K.; Underwood, Malcolm G. (1992). The King's Mother: Lady Margaret Beaufort, Countess of Richmond and Derby. Cambridge University Press.
- Marius, Richard (1984). Thomas More: A Biography. Harvard University Press.
- Thorstad, Audrey M. (2018). "There and Back Again: The Hospitality and Consumption of a Sixteenth-Century English Travelling Household". In Earenfight, Theresa (ed.). Royal and Elite Households in Medieval and Early Modern Europe. Brill. pp. 357–377.
- Call, Michel L. (2005). The royal ancestry bible : a 3,400 pedigree chart compilation (plus index and appendix) containing royal ancestors of 300 colonial American families who are themselves ancestors of 70 million Americans (1st ed.). Salt Lake City, Utah: M.L. Call. ISBN 1933194227. (chart 806)
- Nicholls, C.S.; Le May, G H L, eds. (1993). "Henry Stafford, Second Duke of Buckingham". The Dictionary of national biography (Reprinted ed.). Oxford [England]: Oxford University Press. ISBN 9780198652113.
- Myers, A R (1967). "The household of Queen Elizabeth Woodville, 1466-7". Bulletin of the John Rylands Library. 50 (1): 207–235. ISSN 0301-102X.
- Pugh, T B (1963). The Marcher Lordships of South Wales 1415-1536. Cardiff: University of Wales Press. ISBN 0708301150.
- Smith, George, ed. (1975) [1935]. The coronation of Elizabeth Wydeville, Queen Consort of Edward IV, on May 26th, 1465 : a contemporary account set forth from a XV century manuscript. Cliftonville: Gloucester Reprints. ISBN 0904586006.
