= Duchess of Buckingham =

Title given to the wife of the Duke of Buckingham

Duchess of Buckingham is a title given to the wife of the Duke of Buckingham, an extinct title created several times, formerly in the Peerage of England and latterly in the Peerage of the United Kingdom. It was first created in 1444. The last holder was Alice Anne, Duchess of Buckingham and Chandos, who died in 1931; the dukedom had become extinct when her husband, the 3rd duke, died in 1909.

== Duchesses of Buckingham ==
1st creation (1444)

- Anne Stafford, Duchess of Buckingham (Anne Neville; died 1480), wife of Humphrey Stafford, 1st Duke of Buckingham
- Catherine Woodville, Duchess of Buckingham (Catherine Woodville; c.1458–1497), wife of Henry Stafford, 2nd Duke of Buckingham
- Eleanor Percy, Duchess of Buckingham (Eleanor Percy; c. 1474–1530), wife of Edward Stafford, 3rd Duke of Buckingham

2nd creation (1623)

- Katherine Villiers, Duchess of Buckingham (Katherine Manners, Baroness de Ros; died 1649), wife of George Villiers, 1st Duke of Buckingham
- Mary Villiers, Duchess of Buckingham (Mary Fairfax), wife of George Villiers, 2nd Duke of Buckingham

3rd creation (1702)

- Catherine Sheffield, Duchess of Buckingham (Lady Catherine Darnley), wife of John Sheffield, 1st Duke of Buckingham and Normanby

4th creation (Buckingham and Chandos, UK 1822)

- Anne Temple-Nugent-Brydges-Chandos-Grenville, Duchess of Buckingham (Lady Anne Brydges), wife of Richard Temple-Nugent-Brydges-Chandos-Grenville, 1st Duke of Buckingham and Chandos
- Mary Temple-Nugent-Brydges-Chandos-Grenville, Duchess of Buckingham (Lady Mary Campbell; 1795–1862), wife of Richard Temple-Nugent-Brydges-Chandos-Grenville, 2nd Duke of Buckingham and Chandos
- Caroline, Duchess of Buckingham and Chandos (Caroline Harvey; died 1874), 1st wife of Richard Temple-Nugent-Brydges-Chandos-Grenville, 3rd Duke of Buckingham and Chandos
- Alice Temple-Nugent-Brydges-Chandos-Grenville, Duchess of Buckingham (Alice Graham-Montgomery; 1848–1931), 2nd wife of Richard Temple-Nugent-Brydges-Chandos-Grenville, 3rd Duke of Buckingham and Chandos
