= Ian Russell, 13th Duke of Bedford =

British peer and writer (1917–2002)

His Grace The Duke of Bedford
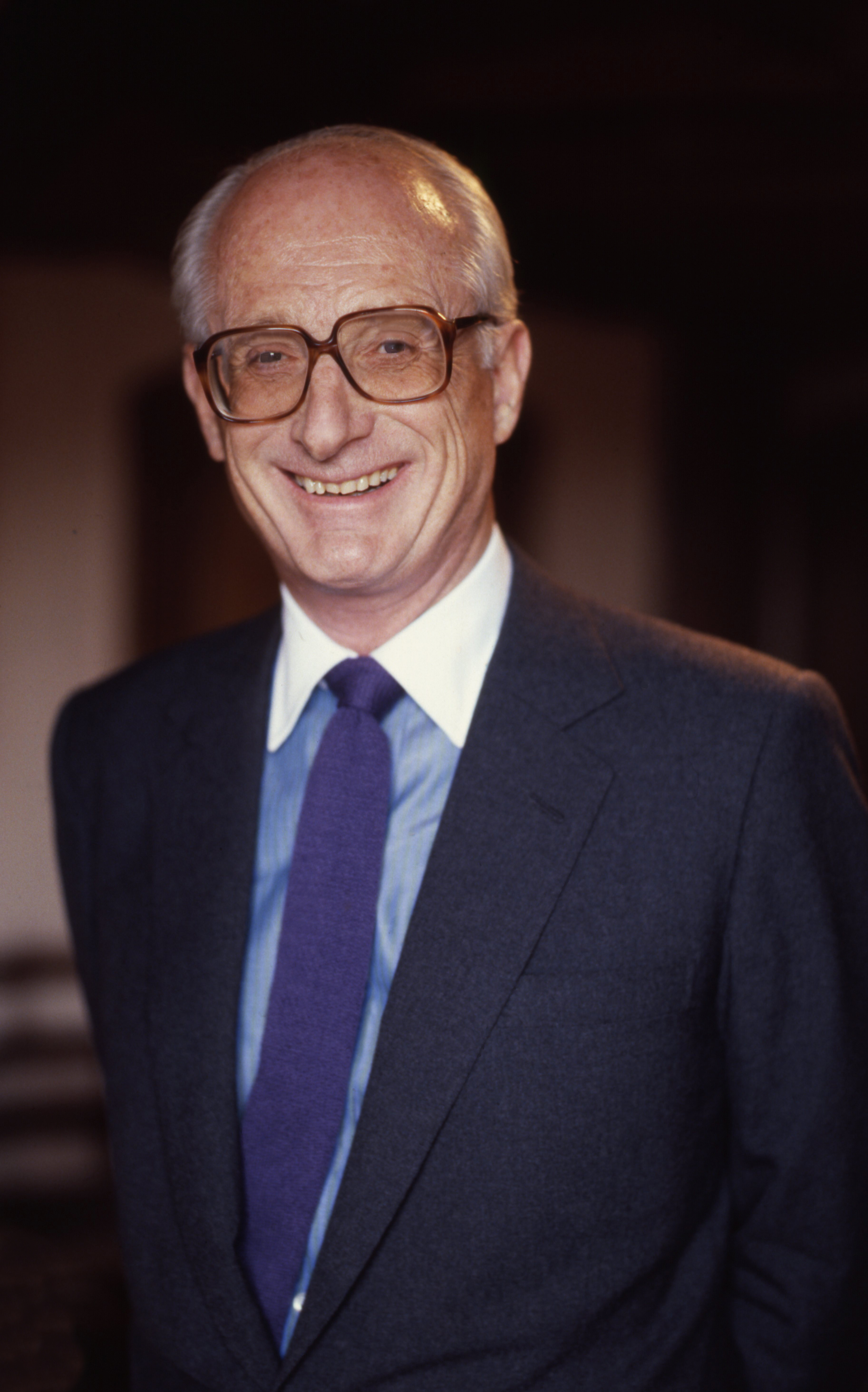
- Portrait taken by Allan Warren

Member of the House of Lords as Duke of Bedford
- In office 9 October 1953 – 25 October 2002
- In office 9 October 1953 – 11 November 1999
- Preceded by: Hastings Russell
- Succeeded by: Seat abolished

Personal details
- Born: 24 May 1917 St George Hanover Square, Middlesex, England
- Died: 25 October 2002 (aged 85) Santa Fe, Santa Fe County, New Mexico, U.S.
- Spouses: Clare Gwendolen Hollway (m. 1939; died 1945) Lydia Lyle (m. 1947; div. 1960) Nicole Marie Charlotte Pierrette Jeanne Milinaire (m. 1960)
- Children: Henry Robin Ian Russell, 14th Duke of Bedford; Rudolf Russell; Francis Hastings Russell
- Parent(s): Hastings Russell, 12th Duke of Bedford; Louisa Crommelin Roberta Jowitt Whitwell

John Ian Robert Russell, 13th Duke of Bedford (24 May 1917 – 25 October 2002), styled Lord Howland until 1940, and styled Marquess of Tavistock from 1940 until 1953, was a writer and a British peer. As a businessman, the Duke and J. Chipperfield founded Woburn Safari Park, a commercial addition and expansion of the tourist business of Woburn Abbey, the family seat.

== Background and education ==
John Ian Robert Russell was born the son of Hastings Russell, 12th Duke of Bedford and Louisa Russell, Duchess of Bedford. Russell had a strained relationship with his father and grandfather for their refusing him an allowance that he (Ian) felt would be suitable and sufficient for a future Duke of Bedford. In youth, the 13th Duke of Bedford was known as Ian, and addressed with the courtesy title Lord Howland. At his father's succession to the dukedom of Bedford in 1940, and his consequent adoption of the courtesy title "Lord Howland", Ian then acquired the courtesy title Marquess of Tavistock until he became Duke of Bedford in the 1950s.

== Career ==
Ian Russell began as a rent collector in 1938, in Stepney. In 1939, he joined the Coldstream Guards and fought in the Second World War between 1939 and 1940, but left the army after being invalided. In 1940, he became a reporter for the Daily Express. In 1948, he emigrated to the Union of South Africa where he farmed in the Paarl area, before returning to the UK upon succeeding to his father's estates.

In 1953, at the death of his father, the 12th Duke of Bedford, Russell then faced death-duty taxes of $14 million, but paid that tax debt by commercialising the house and lands of Woburn Abbey, and charging admission to the local public and foreign tourists, in 1955, instead of handing over the family estates to the National Trust, and later expanded the Woburn Abbey business with the creation and addition of the Woburn Safari Park, in 1970.

Russell's commercialisation of his Woburn Abbey property alienated some peers from being his friends and neighbours. In response to the aristocratic scorn about the commercial vulgarity of a profitable safari park, Russell said that: “I do not relish the scorn of the peerage, but it is better to be looked down on than [to be] overlooked”.

As a writer of books, Russell has published:

- A Silver-Plated Spoon (1959)
- The Duke of Bedford's Book of Snobs (1965) with George Mikes
- The Flying Duchess (1968) about Mary Russell, Duchess of Bedford
- How to Run a Stately Home (1971) with George Mikes

Russell was one of the few UK owners of a new 1958 Edsel Citation sedan motorcar, which he bought soon after the Ford car company launched the car model in September 1957; Russell's Edsel was registered “1 MMC”. In 1958, Russell hosted the radio programme The Duke Disks, transmitted on Radio Luxembourg featuring "Que Será, Será" as his signature song, which also was the motto of the Russell family.

He appeared in British, American, and West German feature films and television programmes, including The Iron Maiden (filmed partially at Woburn); V.I.P.-Schaukel, with Margret Dünser; Coronation Street; and The Golden Shot.

He was named to the International Best Dressed List Hall of Fame in 1985.

== Family ==
Russell married three times; his wives were:

- Clare Gwendolen Hollway (1903 – 1 September 1945), daughter of Ernest John Bridgeman (New Zealand, 22 September 1883 – 18 July 1955) and Jessica "Jessie", née Weir. Previously the wife of Major Kenneth Chamney Walpole Hollway, she had been the mistress of several men, including Sir Hugh Smiley, a brother-in-law of Cecil Beaton, who reportedly spent "much of his inheritance" on jewels for her. She died of an overdose of sodium amytal tablets, which she took in front of her husband. The Russells had two children:
  - Henry Robin Ian Russell, 14th Duke of Bedford (1940–2003)
  - Lord Rudolf Russell (b. 7 March 1944), married in 1989 (div 2008) Farah Diana Moghaddam (died 2010)
- Lydia Lyle (17 October 1917 – 25 July 2006), daughter of John Yarde-Buller, 3rd Baron Churston and Denise (née Orme); this duchess was the widow of Capt. Ian Archibald de Hoghton Lyle (1909–1942), heir to a baronetcy, by which marriage she brought to Woburn two step-children. Married on 13 February 1947 and divorced in 1960, they had one child:
  - Lord Francis Hastings Russell (b. 27 February 1950), married in 1971 Mrs Faith Diane Carrington (née Ibrahim), a Singapore-born model
- Nicole Milinaire (29 June 1920 – 7 September 2012, née Schneider), a French television producer, former courier for the French Resistance, and former wife of businessman Henri Milinaire on 4 September 1960; they had no issue but she brought four stepchildren to the marriage.

Bedford and his last duchess became tax exiles in 1974, eventually settling in Monaco. He died in Santa Fe, Santa Fe County, New Mexico, in 2002.

Peerage of England
Preceded by Hastings Russell	Duke of Bedford; 1953–2002	Succeeded by Robin Russell
