= Donald Pickering =

English actor (1933–2009)

- Born: Donald Ellis Pickering; 15 November 1933; Newcastle upon Tyne, Northumberland, England
- Died: 19 December 2009 (aged 76); Gloucestershire, England
- Education: Old Vic Theatre School
- Occupation: Actor
- Years active: 1952–2004

Donald Ellis Pickering (15 November 1933 – 19 December 2009) was an English actor, appearing in many stage, television, film and radio roles.

== Early life and education ==
Pickering was born in Newcastle upon Tyne, son of John Joseph Pickering (died 1978) and Edith (died 1983), née Ellis. He was educated privately and at the Old Vic Theatre School in London established by Michel Saint-Denis.

== Career ==
Pickering's television appearances include three roles in Doctor Who (The Keys of Marinus, 1964; The Faceless Ones, 1967; Time and the Rani, 1987). In the 26-part BBC series The Pallisers, he played Dolly Longstaffe. He also played roles in The House of Eliott, Dr. Watson in the series Sherlock Holmes and Doctor Watson (1979–1980), Yes, Prime Minister, The Brittas Empire, Executive Stress and The Professionals.

== Filmography ==
Year	Title	Role	Notes
1957	Doctor at Large	Cyril	Uncredited
1957	Carry On Admiral	Second Officer	Uncredited
1964	Nothing But the Best	Adrian Slater	
1965	Battle of the Bulge		
1966	Fahrenheit 451	Bernard	Uncredited
1967	A Challenge for Robin Hood	Sir Jamyl de Penitone	
1970	The Breaking of Bumbo	Jorum	
1977	A Bridge Too Far	Lieutenant Colonel Mackenzie	
1977	The Three Hostages	McGillivray	
1978	The Thirty Nine Steps	Marshall	
1979	Zulu Dawn	Major Russell	
1979	Yanks	Golfing friend	
1983	Scarab	Harrington	
1986	Half Moon Street	George Hardcastle	
1997	The Man Who Knew Too Little	Sir Duncan	
1998	Monk Dawson	Archbishop of Westminster	
2000	Undertaker's Paradise		

== Television ==
Year	Title	Role	Notes
1956	ITV Television Playhouse	Brian Preston	Episode: "Woman in a Dressing Gown"
1957	BBC Sunday Night Theatre	Major Charles Hugonin	Episode: "His Excellency"
1959-1961	ITV Play of the Week	Various	3 episodes
1960	BBC Sunday-Night Play	Geoffrey Preston	Episode: "Twentieth Century Theatre: Musical Chairs"
1963	No Hiding Place	Frank Murphy	Episode: "As Well As Murder"
1964	The Human Jungle	Jack Lamond	Episode: "Skeleton in a Cupboard"
1965	Gideon C.I.D.	"Bookie" Barton Smith	Episode: "The Thin Red Line"
1964, 1967, 1987	Doctor Who	Eyesen / Captain Blade / Beyus	Serials: "The Keys of Marinus", "The Faceless Ones", "Time and the Rani"
1964–1966	The Saint	Jeremy/Hans	2 episodes
1966-1977	BBC Play of the Month	Various	6 episodes
1967–1969	The Avengers	S5. E6 the winged avenger 1967 Peter Roberts S7.E26 Homicide and Old Lace 1969 Freddie Cartwright	
1968	The Champions	Colonel Banks	Episode: "The Fanatics"
1969	The Wednesday Play	Man at party	Episode: "All Out for Kangaroo Valley"
1970	Jackanory	Narrator	Episode: "The Ghosts"
1971	The Persuaders!	Morley Lyndon	Episode: "Someone Waiting"
1972	A Family at War	Eric Fraser	2 episodes
1973	The Rivals of Sherlock Holmes	Fielding	Episode: "Cell 13"
1973	Lord Peter Wimsey	Dr. Penberthy	Episode: "The Unpleasantness at the Bellona Club"
1973	Softly, Softly: Task Force	Turnbull	Episode: "Catch as Catch Can"
1974	The Pallisers	Dolly Longstaffe	20 episodes
1977	Play for Today	Angus Nash	Episode: "The Country Party"
1978	Return of the Saint	Sir Trevor Stevens	Episode: "The Arrangement"
1978	Gangsters	Mr. Buckram	Episode: "Enter the White Devil"
1979	Crown Court	Clive Ransome	Episode: "Crash"
1979–1980	Sherlock Holmes and Doctor Watson	Dr. Watson	
1980	Tales of the Unexpected	Gallery Owner	Episode: "Skin"
1982	The Professionals	Brigadier Tennant	Episode: "Lawson's Last Stand"
1983	The Cleopatras	Lucullus	Episode: "100 BC"
1986	Yes, Prime Minister	Sir Richard Wharton, Permanent Secretary to the Foreign and Commonwealth Office	2 episodes
1986	Return to Treasure Island	Hallows	Miniseries
1986-1987	Executive Stress	Gordon	4 episodes
1987, 1992	Rumpole of the Bailey	Attorney General/Gavin Bastion	2 episodes
1988	All Creatures Great and Small	Sir Robert	Episode: "Choose a Bright Morning"
1991	The House of Eliott	Editor	First episode
1994	Lovejoy	Sir Roger	Episode: "Holding the Baby"
1994	Scarlett	Randolph	1 episode
1997	The Brittas Empire	Colonel Featherley	Episode: "Gavin Featherly R.I.P"
2001	Heartbeat	Andrew Parkin	Episode: "Who's Who?"
2003	Doctors	Simon Hardcastle	Episode: "The Forgotten Warrior"
2004	Holby City	Sir Joshua Wren	Episode: "Under Pressure"
