= Patrick O'Neal (actor) =

American actor and restaurateur (1927–1994)

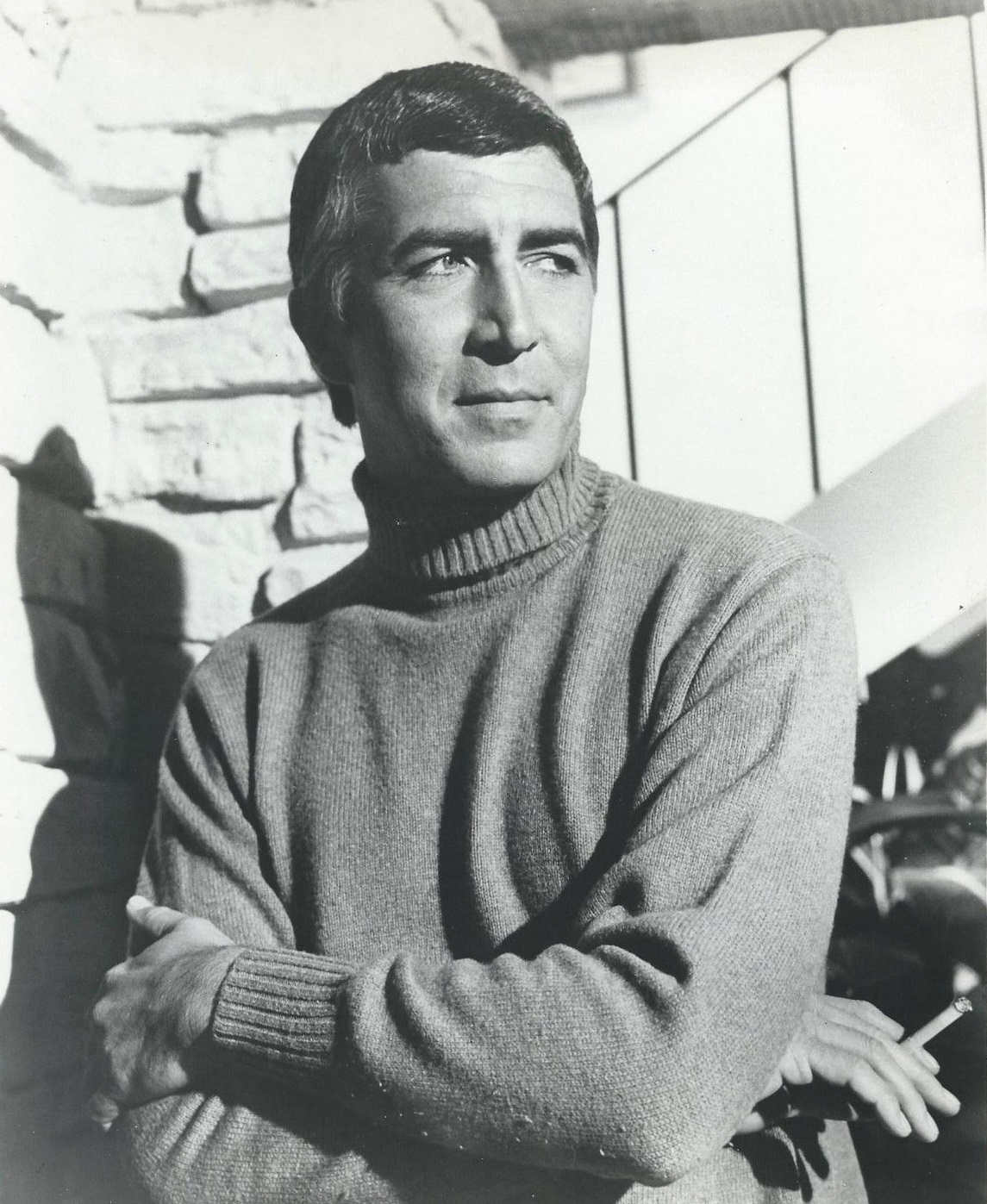
- O'Neal in 1968
- Born: Patrick Wisdom O'Neal; September 26, 1927; Ocala, Florida, U.S.
- Died: September 9, 1994 (aged 66); New York City, New York, U.S.
- Education: Riverside Military Academy; Ocala High School; University of Florida
- Occupations: Actor; restaurateur
- Years active: 1952–1994
- Spouse: Cynthia Baxter (m. 1956)
- Children: 2
- Military career
- Allegiance: United States
- Branch: United States Air Force
- Service years: 1952–53
- Conflicts: Korean War

Patrick Wisdom O'Neal (September 26, 1927 – September 9, 1994) was an American actor and restaurateur.

== Early life ==
O'Neal was born in Ocala, Florida, to Martha and Coke Wisdom O'Neal. He attended the Riverside Military Academy in Gainesville, Georgia, and Ocala High School. Upon graduation, he enrolled at the University of Florida in Gainesville where he majored in drama. During college, O'Neal joined the Florida Players, a theatre troupe. He was also a member of the Sigma Alpha Epsilon fraternity and was the editor of the university yearbook. After earning a bachelor's degree, O'Neal enlisted in the United States Air Force and served during the Korean War. During the war, he directed short training films. After 15 months' service, he moved to New York and studied at the Actors Studio and Neighborhood Playhouse.

== Career ==
O'Neal was seen mostly as a guest star on television throughout four decades, beginning in the 1950s. In the early 1960s, he received critical praise for his leading role on Broadway in Tennessee Williams' The Night of the Iguana, but the starring role for the 1964 film version went to Richard Burton. In 1969, he had a leading role in John Huston's The Kremlin Letter and a supporting role in the western El Condor. He appeared in the 1973 hit The Way We Were. In 1972, he portrayed a murderous architect in the Columbo episode "Blueprint for Murder" and in 1978, on the same show, he played a television network executive in the episode "Make Me a Perfect Murder". In 1990, he played the corrupt New York District Attorney in the Homicide Bureau, Kevin Quinn, in Sidney Lumet's Q&A.

With his wife and his brother Michael, O'Neal co-owned a number of successful restaurants beginning in 1963, including "The Ginger Man" on West 64th Street (later renamed O'Neal's); "O'Neal's" on West 57th Street, briefly the flagship of an O'Neal's chain; "The Landmark Tavern" on 11th Avenue; and “O’Neal’s Saloon” at West 63rd Street and Columbus Avenue, soon retitled "O'Neal's Baloon" (because the word “Saloon” had been outlawed during Prohibition but the neon sign for Saloon had already been created). All were located on the West Side of Manhattan.

== Personal life ==
O'Neal married actress Cynthia Baxter in 1956. They had two sons, Maximilian and Fitzjohn, and remained married until O'Neal's death.

=== Death ===
O'Neal died aged 66 on September 9, 1994, of respiratory failure at Saint Vincent's Catholic Medical Center in Manhattan. At the time of his death, he was also suffering from lung cancer and tuberculosis.

== Partial filmography ==
=== Films ===
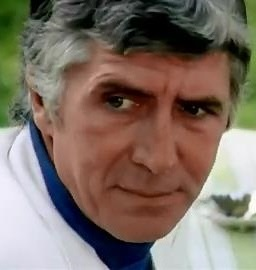
O'Neal in The Stepford Wives (1975)

- The Mad Magician (1954) as Lt. Alan Bruce
- The Black Shield of Falworth (1954) as Walter Blunt
- From the Terrace (1960) as Dr. Jim Roper
- A Matter of Morals (1961) as Alan Kennebeck
- The Cardinal (1963) as Cecil Turner
- In Harm's Way (1965) as Commander Neal Owynn
- King Rat (1965) as Max
- A Fine Madness (1966) as Dr. Oliver West
- Alvarez Kelly (1966) as Major Albert Stedman
- Chamber of Horrors (1966) as Jason Cravatte (aka Jason Caroll)
- Matchless (1967) as Perry "Matchless" Liston
- Assignment to Kill (1968) as Richard Cutting
- Where Were You When the Lights Went Out? (1968) as Peter Garrison
- The Secret Life of an American Wife (1968) as Tom Layton
- Castle Keep (1969) as Capt. Lionel Beckman
- Stiletto (1969) as George Baker
- The Kremlin Letter (1970) as Charles Rone
- El Condor (1970) as Chavez
- Corky (1972) as Randy
- Silent Night, Bloody Night (1972) as John Carter
- The Way We Were (1973) as George Bissinger
- To Kill the King (1974) as David Howard
- The Stepford Wives (1975) as Dale Coba
- The Stuff (1985) as Fletcher
- Like Father Like Son (1987) as Dr. Larry Armbruster
- New York Stories (1989) as Phillip Fowler (segment: "Life Lessons")
- Q & A (1990) as Kevin Quinn
- Alice (1990) as Alice's Father
- For the Boys (1991) as Shephard
- Under Siege (1992) as Captain Adams

=== Television ===
- The Pepsi-Cola Playhouse (1 episode, 1954)
- Appointment with Adventure (2 episodes, 1955–1956)
- Dick and the Duchess (25 episodes, 1957–1958) as Dick Starrett
- One Step Beyond (1 episode, 1959) as Mitchell Campion
- Diagnosis: Unknown (3 episodes, 1960) as Dr. Daniel Coffee
- The Millionaire (episode: “The Story of Elizabeth Tander”, 1960) as David Stevens
- Naked City (1 episode, 1962) as Roy Pressfield
- The Twilight Zone (episode: "A Short Drink from a Certain Fountain", 1963) as Harmon Gordon
- Alfred Hitchcock Hour (episode: "Bed of Roses", 1964) as George Maxwell
- Route 66 (1 episode, 1963: "Same Picture, Different Frame") as Eric
- Outer Limits (episode: "Wolf 359", 1964) as Jonathan Meridith
- Night Gallery (1 episode, 1971) as Justus Walters (segment: "A Fear of Spiders")
- McCloud (2 episodes, 1971–1972) as Alex Demarest/Arthur Yerby
- Columbo (2 episodes, 1972–1978) as Frank Flanagan/Elliot Markham
- Cannon (1 episode, 1972) as Arlo Hemming
- Marcus Welby M.D. (1 episode, 1972) as Dr. Valentine Peterson
- The Doris Day Show (3 episodes, 1972–1973) as Jonathan Rusk
- Barnaby Jones (3 episodes, 1973–1976) as Coleman Reeves/Frank Cabot/Charles Manly Wheeling
- Thriller (1 episode, 1974) as Michael Lane
- The Moneychangers (miniseries, 1976) as Harold Austin
- Kaz (23 episodes, 1978–1979) as Samuel Bennett
- Emerald Point N.A.S. (9 episodes, 1983) as Harlan Adams
- Tales of the Unexpected (1 episode, 1984) as Sutton
- Murder, She Wrote (1 episode, 1985) as Si Parrish
- Perry Mason Returns (television movie, 1985) as Arthur Gordon
- Maigret (television movie, 1988) as Kevin Portman
- Perry Mason: The Case of the Skin-Deep Scandal (television movie, 1993) as Arthur Westbrook (final film role)

== Partial stage credits ==
Year	Title	Role	Venue	Notes	Ref.
1953	My Three Angels		La Jolla Playhouse, San Diego		
1953	Stalag 17		La Jolla Playhouse, San Diego		
1955	Oh Men! Oh Women!		Edgewater Beach Playhouse, Chicago		
1956	The Little Hut		La Jolla Playhouse, San Diego		
1958	Lulu	Walter Schwarz	Fourth Street Theatre, New York		
1961	A Far Country	Frederick Wohlmuth	Music Box Theatre, New York		
1961–62	The Night of the Iguana	T. Lawrence Shannon	Royale Theatre, New York		
1963	The Ginger Man	Sebastian Balfe Dangerfield	Orpheum Theatre, New York		
