= Sheldon Reynolds (producer) =

American television producer (1923–2003)

Sheldon Reynolds (10 December 1923 – 25 January 2003) was an American television producer best known for his involvement in the Sherlock Holmes franchise.

He began his career as producer, writer and editor of the syndicated television show Foreign Intrigue. In 1954, he produced the first American television show to feature the Holmes and Watson characters, Sherlock Holmes, which (except in two instances) did not directly adapt Conan Doyle's original Holmes stories. It starred Ronald Howard as Sherlock Holmes and Howard Marion-Crawford as Doctor Watson, and Archie Duncan as Inspector Lestrade. Most of the filming took place in France with several sets having been built in Paris, including the street outside 221B Baker Street. In 1979, he was involved in the creation of another Sherlock Holmes adaptation, the television series Sherlock Holmes and Doctor Watson, starring Geoffrey Whitehead as Holmes, Donald Pickering as Watson and Patrick Newell as Lestrade. The series had a relatively low budget and was filmed in Poland and while it had followed the same format of his previous Holmes series, it was considerably less successful.

In the 1970s, Reynolds attempted to acquire a license to produce direct adaptations of the stories. At that time, the rights were in the hands of the Royal Bank of Scotland, which acquired them after the previous owner defaulted on a loan. Reynolds successfully formed a consortium which acquired the rights at auction. Much of the money for the consortium came from the family of Reynolds' then-wife, Andrea Reynolds-Plunket. After their divorce in 1990, she pursued the ownership of the American copyright in a number of court cases, but her claims were rejected.

In the 1957–1958 season, Reynolds became executive producer of an American sitcom filmed in the United Kingdom, Dick and the Duchess, starring Patrick O'Neal and Hazel Court.

Reynolds died of emphysema.
