= Hastings Russell, 12th Duke of Bedford =

British peer and politician (1888–1953)

His Grace The Duke of Bedford
- Portrait by Walter Stoneman, 1952
- Tenure: 27 August 1940 – 9 October 1953
- Successor: Ian Russell, 13th Duke of Bedford
- Other titles: 12th Marquess of Tavistock; 16th Earl of Bedford; 16th Baron Russell; 14th Baron Russell of Thornhaugh; 12th Baron Howland
- Born: 21 December 1888; Minnigaff, Kirkcudbrightshire, Scotland
- Died: 9 October 1953 (aged 64); Endsleigh Cottage, Devon, England
- Spouse: Louisa Crommelin Roberta Jowitt Whitwell (m. 1914)
- Issue: John Ian Robert Russell, 13th Duke of Bedford; Daphne Crommelin Russell; Hugh Hastings Russell
- Parents: Herbrand Russell, 11th Duke of Bedford; Mary du Caurroy Tribe

Hastings William Sackville Russell, 12th Duke of Bedford (21 December 1888 – 9 October 1953), known from 1893 to 1940 as the Marquess of Tavistock, was a British peer. He was born at Cairnsmore House, Minnigaff, Kirkcudbrightshire, the son of Herbrand Russell, 11th Duke of Bedford, and his wife Mary Du Caurroy Tribe, the aviator and ornithologist. He was known for both his career as a naturalist and for his involvement in British far-right politics including his involvement as the co-founder of the British People's Party.

Bedford died after accidentally shooting himself in 1953.

== Early life ==
Educated at Eton College, Tavistock graduated from Balliol College, Oxford with a BA degree later promoted by seniority to an Oxford MA. He was commissioned into the 10th Battalion, the Middlesex Regiment, but did not see active service in the First World War, owing to ill health.

== Naturalism ==
A keen naturalist, Tavistock arranged a 1906 expedition to Shaanxi, China to collect zoological specimens for the British Museum, during which Arthur de Carle Sowerby discovered a new species of jerboa. He was also closely involved in his father's ultimately successful efforts to preserve the Père David's deer, a Chinese species that was close to extinction in the late 19th and early 20th centuries.

He was also an ornithologist, specialising in parrots and budgerigars, to whom he would feed chocolates, although his eldest son was often reduced to eating them; his other pets included a spider to whom, according to Nancy Mitford's The English Aristocracy, he would regularly feed roast beef and Yorkshire pudding.

While known as the Marquess of Tavistock, he wrote "Parrots and Parrot-like Birds". He was a founder member and first President of the Foreign Bird League. He was successful in breeding many species, including the Tahiti Blue Lorikeet and Ultramarine Lorikeet. Both of these are recognised as the world's first breedings in captivity. The Marquess disposed of his birds upon succeeding to the Dukedom in 1939.

== Politics ==
=== Pre-war activity ===
Tavistock was active in politics for much of his life. In his youth he flirted with socialism and even communism but soon abandoned these in favour of Social Credit, establishing his own National Credit Association to promote the ideology. He addressed the membership of the New Party about Social Credit but the scheme was not taken up by Sir Oswald Mosley's group. Tavistock was also a leading figure in the Economic Reform Club. Tavistock also frequently visited the Canadian province of Alberta where the Social Credit party led by a fundamentalist Protestant William "Bible Bill" Aberhart had won the 1935 election.

However, Aberhart was unable to execute the Social Credit platform as the Dominion government used its disallowance power under the British North America Act to block Aberhart's proposed radical changes. The way that the Social Credit government of Alberta failed to carry out its program was understood by Tavistock not as due to the BNA act, but rather to a supposed conspiracy to impoverish the masses. He wrote in the New English Weekly in support of the Anschluss in 1938. In a series of letters to the editor of New English Weekly, he wrote that he was considering cancelling his subscription because of its criticism of the Nazi regime. In one letter dated 7 April 1938 he wrote: "Hitler is supported with enthusiasm by large sections of the population because he gave German youth faith and hope in the future, restored their self-respect, and did much to reduce unemployment". He wrote that there was "little evidence that he [Hitler] would engage in an aggressive war with a non-German nation", and criticised the Chamberlain government for its rearmament program.

Tavistock was a founder of the British People's Party (BPP) in 1939 and used his money to bankroll the group from then on. The driving force behind the BPP was John Beckett, a former Labour Member of Parliament who had also been a member of the British Union of Fascists and the National Socialist League. According to his son, Francis Beckett, John Beckett did not have much real devotion to the unassuming and uncharismatic Tavistock but was attracted to the BPP as much by the Marquess' money as any real conviction, Beckett himself being virtually penniless at the time. Lord Tavistock was the president of the BPP, but most of those associated with the party came from the Left. Of the members of the BPP executive council, Beckett had once been an MP for the Independent Labour Party, John Scanlon had been a left-wing journalist, and Ben Greene had once belonged to the Labour Party. The party's platform seemed mostly concerned with economic issues, but in practice the party was opposed to the prospect of a war with Germany.

The platform of the BPP called for "the right to security and social justice", the "abolition of a financial system based upon usury which perpetuates social and economic injustice", the "security of labour in its industrial organisation", the "abolition of all class differences", the "safeguarding the employment and integrity of the British people against alien influence and infiltration", and the "abolition of all military alliances and political and economic commitments which may involve this country in wars which in no way affect the security and national independence of our peoples".

The BPP's ideology seems to have based upon the Parti Populaire Français led by Jacques Doriot, a French communist turned fascist. Despite the vaguely left-wing platform of the BPP, the party primarily campaigned on a peace platform during the Danzig crisis of 1939 as it argued that another war with Germany would be a mistake. Tavistock, along with the Duke of Westminster, Lord Mount Temple, Lord Brocket, the Duke of Buccleuch, Lord Mottistone, Lord Arnold, and Lord Sempill, lobbied the Chamberlain government to settle the Danzig crisis peacefully, preferably by Britain abandoning the commitment to defend Poland. Tavistock recruited the famous explorer of Arabia, St. John Philby, to run as the BPP candidate in a by-election in Hythe solely on an anti-war platform.

Philby, in his 1948 memoir Arabian Days, wrote "...I was approached by Lord Tavistock, John Beckett and Ben Greene of a new and small organisation called the British People's Party, with those general outlook I had no sympathy, though I fully and cordially agreed with the anti-war attitude. Eventually I agreed to fight the Hythe by-election". Reflecting the way that various extreme right movements in Britain often co-operated, Lady Domville, the wife of Admiral Barry Domvile, the leader of The Link, campaigned hard for Philby in the Hythe by-election.

=== During World War II ===
Tavistock was friendly with Barry Domvile, the founder of the Link, and had been close to that semi-clandestine group since its establishment in 1937. In the early months of the Second World War, he attended several meetings of leading figures on the far-right that Domvile had organised, although he was largely unenthusiastic about this initiative.

Tavistock chaired the British Council for Christian Settlement in Europe, established immediately after the declaration of war and featuring an eclectic melange of fascists, fascist sympathisers and committed pacifists. He was a committed pacifist across the board, rejecting war entirely, in contrast to Beckett and several other leading members of the group who were explicitly opposed to war with Nazi Germany rather than to war as a concept. During the early days of the war, Tavistock was also courted by the British Union of Fascists (BUF), who had changed their name to the British Union, and held meetings with Neil Francis Hawkins, the group's Director-General. He had earlier been a sometime member of the January Club, a BUF-linked discussion group. He had grown close to BUF member Robert Gordon-Canning, and under his influence even came to write for the BUF's newspaper Action.

Nonetheless, in private, BUF leader Sir Oswald Mosley dismissed Russell as "woolly-headed." Tavistock engaged in a lengthy correspondence with the Foreign Secretary, Lord Halifax over the justice of the war, starting on 18 January 1940. He blamed the war on Poland, writing that he could not understand why during the Danzig crisis, Halifax had not pressured the Poles into accepting "Herr Hitler's extremely reasonable March proposals." Tavistock portrayed Hitler as a victim as he continued: "We should not forget that even in our our boyhood the German Jew was a by-word for all that was objectionable; that there is good evidence of unfair treatment by the Czechs of German minorities and ample evidence of unjust and even brutal treatment of the Germans by the Poles". He portrayed the war as an unjust struggle, accused France of seeking to maintain what he called the unjust Treaty of Versailles and argued that Hitler was a man of peace whose efforts to save the peace had been rejected by the British and the French. Later in the summer of 1940, Tavistock published all of his correspondence with Halifax under the title The Fate of A Peace Effort.

At the start of 1940, he corresponded with the Home Secretary Sir John Anderson after obtaining a document from the German legation in Dublin that Russell claimed contained Adolf Hitler's draft proposals for peace. Following the obtaining of this document by Tavistock, on 13 March 1940 Domvile organised a meeting for both men, Mosley and Imperial Fascist League (IFL) veteran Bertie Mills to discuss their next course of action. At this meeting, Mosley proposed the creation of a "Peace Government" to be led by David Lloyd George, although nothing more came of this initiative as the government soon launched a crackdown on far-right activity. One of the leading members of the British Union was Edward Godfrey whose political views the Special Branch of Scotland Yard described being less with the British Union and "more with the Duke of Bedford". The Special Branch described Godfrey in May 1940 as "an embittered and class-conscious proprietor of a chain of fish and chips shops...who is bitterly opposed to the war and violently anti-Jewish".

On 20 May 1940, a meeting was called at the Dover Castle pub in Bethnal Green to discuss forming the British National Party to be led by Godfrey and which was to be funded entirely by Bedford's wealth. At the meeting, Ben Stokes of the BUF who was acting as Godfrey's agent stated that a "monster meeting" would be held in London sometime later that spring under which the new British National Party would be unveiled. Stokes stated that the executive council of the new party would consist of Tavistock, the military historian General J. F. C. Fuller, Captain Bernard Acworth, Lord Sempill, the writer John Middleton Murry and Lord Lymington.

A report from MI5 noted that every name on the list belonged to the F3 category, which MI5 defined as "terrorism, excluding Irish terrorism". The plan came to naught when Mosley insisted on being the leader of the new party as a condition of having the BUF join the British National Party while Godfrey continued to insist on his claim to be the leader and that Mosley should step aside.

Leading figures were interned under Defence Regulation 18B although Tavistock was not among their number. Tavistock's nobility helped to ensure that he avoided arrest along with other far-right leaning noblemen such as the Lord Lymington, the Duke of Buccleuch, the Duke of Westminster, the Earl of Mar, Lord Brocket, Lord Queenborough and others. His personal links to Foreign Secretary Lord Halifax also helped to ensure his freedom. He wrote a series of letters to Halifax in the early days of the war expressing his admiration for Hitler and urging him to use his influence to bring the war to a swift conclusion. Tavistock was, however, placed on the "Suspect List" by MI5 as some within that group suspected that, in the event of a successful Nazi invasion of the UK, Tavistock might have ended up as Governor of the territory or even Prime Minister of a puppet government. Under the suspect list, Tavistock was to be arrested immediately without charge in the event of a German invasion as a potential traitor and collaborator.

Beckett however was among those held, and Tavistock attempted to intervene on his behalf, assisting Beckett's common-law wife Anne Cutmore in a letter-writing campaign to secure his release. When Beckett was released Cutmore again asked Tavistock, by then Duke of Bedford, for help as they were penniless and he agreed to allow them to live in a cottage in the village of Chenies, at the time entirely owned by the Duchy. He would continue to underwrite the Becketts until his death in 1953, even purchasing a large house in Rickmansworth for the family's use in 1949.

On 18 November 1941, speaking in the House of Commons, the Lord Chancellor, Sir John Simon, noted that the duke was lucky to be British as he noted "If he was a German and was in Germany, and if he gave expression to the reverse opinion and denounced Hitler and all his works, and found excuses for Hitler's enemies", he would have been sent to a concentration camp or executed. On 3 December 1941, Bedford took up his seat in the House of Lords, and immediately attracted attention for a series of speeches that condemned the Churchill government and the war. His speeches in the House of Lords were noted for their pro-Axis tone as he blamed the war on "the attempt by the moneylending financers and big business monopolists to destroy the relatively sane financial system of the Axis powers". Bedford used his great wealth during the war to fund a number of fascist groups such as the British National Party and the English Nationalists Association. The British historian Richard Griffiths noted that the groups that the Duke of Bedford funded were "remarkably unsuccessful", which led him to suggest that the way he poured millions of pounds into such groups reflected his convictions rather than any hope of power. In a letter to the pro-Nazi historian Sir Arthur Bryant dated 5 July 1944, Bedford bemoaned that the Allies were winning the war.

On 12 April 1945, he learned that American President Franklin D. Roosevelt had died. In an obituary of Roosevelt published in The Word magazine, Bedford gloated over his death and wrote that Roosevelt had been "an inveterate and unscrupulous war-monger and a tool of Big Finance". On 30 April 1945, he learned that Hitler had committed suicide. In an obituary of Hitler published in Talking Picture News, Bedford wrote that "Hitler's virtues had caused his destruction to be ordinated by the financers of the City and Wall Street using the politicians as their puppets". In contrast to the gloating, cheering tone in his obituary of Roosevelt, there was a sad, dejected tone to his obituary of Hitler. On 8 May 1945, he responded to the news that Germany had surrendered by writing that the war was "a glorious victory" for "Soviet tyranny and Big Finance".

=== Post-war ===
Bedford re-established the BPP in 1945, the group having been in abeyance during the later years of the war. Party activity was limited and often restricted to irregular party functions hosted at the Becketts' house in Rickmansworth. Increasingly associated with the anti-Semitism espoused by leading BPP figures, Bedford stated that the figure of six million Jewish deaths in the Holocaust was "grossly exaggerated" and argued that a figure of 300,000 concentration camp deaths, drawn from all those interned rather than just Jews, was more likely. He also denied that any concentration camp had a gas chamber, claiming they were just showers. He also funded the publication of Failure at Nuremberg, a pamphlet authored by the "BPP Research Department" (effectively Beckett, A. K. Chesterton and former IFL member Harold Lockwood) which denounced the Nuremberg trials of leading Nazis as a series of show trials that started from the basis of presumed guilt on the part of the defendants. Unusually, he also contributed articles on Social Credit and pacifism to anarchist Guy Aldred's journal, The Word, between 1940 and his death.

== Personal life ==
In London, Middlesex, on 21 November 1914, he married Louisa Crommelin Roberta Jowitt Whitwell; the couple had three children:

- John Ian Robert Russell, 13th Duke of Bedford (1917–2002), who supplied a detailed and hostile portrait of him in the 1959 memoir A Silver-Plated Spoon;
- Lady Daphne Crommelin Russell (2 September 1920 – 1 June 1991);
- Lord Hugh Hastings Russell (1923–2005), a conscientious objector in the Second World War, married Rosemary Markby and had issue.

The 12th Duke of Bedford was a committed Evangelical Christian and vegetarian. An austere man who detested alcohol, tobacco and gambling, he was even sued by his wife in the 1930s for "restoration of conjugal rights" after the pair became estranged. The case was dismissed after much press coverage with his wife's description of him as "the most cold, mean and conceited person" she had ever known being widely reported. Following his death, the sentiments were largely echoed by his eldest son – who shared none of his father's political views and had a difficult relationship with him – who stated "my father was the loneliest man I ever knew, incapable of giving or receiving love, utterly self-centred and opinionated. He loved birds, animals, peace, monetary reform, the park and religion. He also had a wife and three children".

Bedford put his 11-acre estate, the Chateau Malet in Cap-d'Ail near Monaco for sale through Knight, Frank & Rutley in 1921.

He published a memoir titled The Years of Transition, in 1949.

=== Death ===
Bedford died in 1953, aged 64, as a result of a gunshot wound in the grounds of his Endsleigh Estate in Devon. The coroner recorded his death as accidentally inflicted, but his elder son suggested it may have been deliberately self-inflicted. Griffiths wrote that his death was almost certainly suicide as the duke had been extremely depressed in the days prior to his death. Griffiths wrote: "When we try to assess the Duke of Bedford's motives, we are confronted with a very complex picture. He was a lonely, introverted character, unable to forge human relationships, possibly a result of his strange upbringing. This lack of human contact may have contributed to his conviction that he was right in all he thought and did, and that it was the world that was out of step, not him. And then there was the succession of obsessions that ruled his life-evangelical Christianity, pacifism, Social Credit, financial reform".

Griffiths wrote that "many of his underlaying attitudes were of themselves admirable", but that Bedford's tendency to explain everything in terms of anti-Semitic conspiracy theories as he believed that the Jews had vast secret powers that they used to dominate the world both politically and economically led him straight into the embrace of Nazism. Griffiths wrote that Bedford was tenacious and obstinate, which led him to express pro-Nazi views in the midst of the war, despite all of the opprobrium that it brought him as he concluded that Bedford "had ideas that blended ill with his real Christian beliefs".

== Bibliography ==
- Francis Beckett, The Rebel Who Lost His Cause – The Tragedy of John Beckett MP, London: Allison and Busby, 1999
- Stephen Dorril, Blackshirt: Sir Oswald Mosley & British Fascism, London: Penguin Books, 2007
- Elliot, David (2004). James Bradford (ed.). Alberta Premiers of the Twentieth Century. Regina: University of Regina Press. pp. 125–145. ISBN 9780889771512.
- Richard Griffiths, Fellow Travellers on the Right, Oxford: Oxford University Press, 1983
- Griffiths, Richard (2016). What Did You Do During the War? The Last Throes of the British Pro-Nazi Right, 1940-45. London: Taylor & Francis. ISBN 9781317495659.
- Martin Pugh, 'Hurrah for the Blackshirts!': Fascists and Fascism in Britain between the Wars, London: Pimlico, 2006
- Kershaw, Ian (2004). Making Friends with Hitler: Lord Londonderry, the Nazis, and the Road to War. London: Penguin Books. ISBN 0143036076.
- Richard Thurlow, Fascism in Britain: From Oswald Mosley's Blackshirts to the National Front, London: IB Tauris, 1998

Peerage of England
Preceded by Herbrand Russell	Duke of Bedford; 1940–1953	Succeeded by Ian Russell
