= Foreign Intrigue =

- Genre: Action/Adventure
- Created by: Sheldon Reynolds
- Starring: Jerome Thor (seasons 1–2); James Daly (season 3); Gerald Mohr (season 4)
- Country of origin: United States
- Original language: English
- No. of seasons: 4
- No. of episodes: 156

Production
- Production locations: Filmstaden, Stockholm, Paris, France, and Vienna, Austria; other European location

Original release
- Network: Syndication
- Release: October 18, 1951 – June 18, 1955

Foreign Intrigue (also known as Foreign Assignment) is a syndicated espionage drama television series produced in Europe by Sheldon Reynolds. The 30-minute series ran for four seasons from 1951 to 1955, producing 156 episodes. It was the first filmed television series from the United States to be broadcast on Canadian television.

The program originally starred Jerome Thor for the first two seasons; in later reruns these episodes were titled Dateline Europe. Thor was succeeded by James Daly for the duration of the third season; in reruns, the Daly episodes were retitled Overseas Adventure. The fourth and final season starred Gerald Mohr as Christopher Storm; when these episodes were rerun they were renamed Cross Current.

== Premise ==
Foreign Intrigue focused on activities of foreign correspondents for news services. Initially, the correspondents were Robert Cannon (Jerome Thor) and Helen Davis (Sydna Scott) for Consolidated News and Steve Godfrey (Bernard Farrel) for Amalgamated News Service. In the third season which ran from 1953 to 1954, Michael Powers (James Daly) and Patricia Bennett (Anne Preville) of Associated News were the central characters. The third season consisted of 39 thirty-minute episodes, with plots dealing with the journalists' efforts to gather information for news stories. In the fourth and final season, the focus shifted to Christopher Storm (Gerald Mohr), an American who operated a hotel in Vienna while working as an undercover agent for the United States government.

== Cast ==
=== Main ===
- Jerome Thor as Robert Cannon (seasons 1–2)
- Sydna Scott as Helen Davis (seasons 1–2)
- James Daly as Michael Powers (season 3)
- Anne Preville as Patricia Bennett (season 3)
- Gerald Mohr as Christopher Storm (season 4)

=== Recurring ===
- John Padovano as Tony Forrest
- Gilbert Robin as Dodo (season 4)
- John Stark as Starky (season 4)

Others seen in the series were Bernard Farrel as Steve Godfrey, an Amalgamated News Service reporter, Robert Arden as Steve Powers, Doreen Denning as Betty Carter, and Nikole Millinaire as a aide.

== Production and locations ==
Principal photography for the first two seasons was shot in Filmstaden, Stockholm. Production moved to Paris, France, for the third season, and then to Vienna, Austria, for the final season, with locations throughout Europe and Scandinavia, including Copenhagen and Stockholm, utilized during the show's run.

Hal Erickson noted in his book, Syndicated Television: The First Forty Years, 1947–1987, the European production provided American viewers "something they weren't getting from their average domestic television product: breathtaking glimpses of the glamour spots of Europe."

== Awards ==
The show was nominated for the Primetime Emmy Awards as follows:

- 1953 – Nominated best mystery, action or adventure program
- 1954 – Nominated best mystery, action or adventure program
- 1955 – Nominated best mystery or intrigue series.

== Follow-up film ==
Sheldon Reynolds also directed a subsequent eponymous 1956 movie, Foreign Intrigue, based on the TV series, which starred Robert Mitchum. John Padovano reprised his role of Tony Forrest for the film.

== Bibliography ==
- Tim Brooks and Earle Marsh, The Complete Directory to Prime Time Network and Cable TV Shows 1946–Present, Ninth edition (New York: Ballantine Books, 2007) ISBN 978-0-345-49773-4
