= John Clinton =

John Clinton may refer to:

- John Clinton, 1st Baron Clinton (died 1315), English peer
- John Clinton, 5th Baron Clinton (died 1464), English peer
- John Clinton, 7th Baron Clinton (died 1514), English peer
- John Clinton, 6th Baron Clinton (c. 1429–1488), English peer
