= Henry Stafford (died 1471) =

English knight (c. 1425–1471)

Sir Henry Stafford
- Born: c. 1425
- Died: 4 October 1471
- Spouse: Margaret Beaufort, Countess of Richmond
- Father: Humphrey Stafford, 1st Duke of Buckingham
- Mother: Lady Anne Neville

Sir Henry Stafford (c. 1425 – 4 October 1471) was the second son of Humphrey Stafford, 1st Duke of Buckingham and Lady Anne Neville, daughter of Ralph de Neville, 1st Earl of Westmorland, and Lady Joan Beaufort. Henry's elder brother, also named Humphrey, died before their father, and so it was Henry's nephew, also Henry, who became the 2nd Duke of Buckingham.

Stafford was the third husband of Margaret Beaufort, Countess of Richmond. The marriage was relatively long and successful and coincided roughly with the minority of Margaret's son, the future Henry VII of England. Both Sir Henry and Lady Margaret were descended from John of Gaunt and were supporters of Henry VI, the head of the House of Lancaster, in the early stages of the Wars of the Roses. However, Stafford later switched his allegiance to the House of York and towards the end of his life contributed to the restoration of Edward IV.

== Birth and early life ==
The date of Henry's birth is unknown, but since his parents were married some time before 18 October 1424 and he was their second son, it is thought that he was born round about 1425. His youngest brother, John Stafford, 1st Earl of Wiltshire, was born on 24 November 1427. The place of Henry's birth is not certain, but the family was closely associated with the town of Stafford, from which it took its name. At the time of Henry's birth his father was 6th Earl of Stafford and had been born in the town, not becoming Duke of Buckingham until 1444.

== Marriage ==
On 3 January 1458 Henry married Margaret Beaufort, who, although still young, was the widow of Edmund Tudor, 1st Earl of Richmond. This marriage had lasted only about a year and Margaret had given birth to her son, Henry Tudor, after Edmund's death.

The wedding of Sir Henry and Lady Margaret is thought to have taken place at Maxstoke Castle, which had been acquired by Henry's father in 1437. She was 14 years old and he was in his early thirties. Since Stafford and Margaret were second cousins, it was necessary to obtain a dispensation for the marriage and this was granted on 6 April 1457. In his will Henry's father settled 400 marks' worth of land on the couple, but the main part of their income came from Margaret's estates. It appears from household accounts and personal letters that the marriage was happy. The couple lived for a while at Bourne Castle in Lincolnshire.

== Wars of the Roses ==
Both Henry and Margaret were great-grandchildren of John of Gaunt and Katherine Swynford and early in the Wars of the Roses they both supported the Lancastrian cause. Henry fought on the Lancastrian side at the Battle of Towton on 29 March 1461. Although in the losing camp, he quickly made his peace with Edward IV, who granted him a pardon on 25 June 1461.

Shortly afterwards, Edward purchased Henry Tudor's wardship for £1000 and placed him in the household of William Herbert, Earl of Pembroke, a staunch Yorkist.

In 1466 the King granted Henry and Margaret the former Beaufort manor of Woking in Surrey. This is said to have been in celebration of the marriage of Henry's nephew, Henry Stafford, 2nd Duke of Buckingham, to Catherine Woodville, sister of the queen consort. The substantial manor house, known variously as Woking Old Hall and Woking Palace, became the principal residence of Henry and Margaret and its position allowed Henry to enter more into political life. He also purchased lands in Old and New Windsor. His brother John, was a regular visitor at Woking "to hunt and play cards" and the staff there included Reginald Bray, who was Henry's Receiver-General.

In May 1467 Henry was summoned to attend the Royal Council at Mortlake and in May 1468 Henry and Margaret were in London to hear the King's public announcement of his intention to invade France. On 20 December 1468 Edward IV visited Woking to attend a hunt and afterwards dined with Henry and Margaret at their hunting lodge at Brookwood.

On 5 January 1470 Henry's brother John was created Earl of Wiltshire, whereas Henry remained a mere knight. This would indicate that the King was not sure of his loyalty. However, despite his illness (see below), Henry was with Edward IV on 12 March 1470 at the Battle of Losecoat Field, where the rebel forces of Sir Robert Welles were defeated. Robert's father, Richard Welles, who was Margaret's stepbrother, had been summarily executed on the King's orders shortly before the battle and afterwards Henry visited Maxey to give Margaret's mother, Lady Welles, the news of her stepson's death.

In the autumn of 1470, Warwick and Clarence returned to England and King Edward was forced to flee into exile. Henry Stafford was arrested, but was soon released following a petition from his wife. After the Readeption of Henry VI in October, Henry and Margaret, together with Henry Tudor and his uncle, Jasper Tudor, attended an audience with the restored King and dined with the King's chamberlain, Sir Richard Tunstall.

In March 1471 Edward IV landed with a small army. The leading Lancastrian commander, the Duke of Somerset, visited Henry and Margaret, his first cousin, at Woking in an attempt to persuade Henry to join the Lancastrian army which was being mustered. Henry was reluctant to commit himself, and adopted delaying tactics. However, on 12 April he made a firm decision to support Edward and to join him, accompanied by his Steward, John Gilpyn, and other retainers. Although ill-prepared, Henry and his men travelled to Barnet, where the Yorkists won a decisive victory on 14 April 1471. The previous day Henry had made a hastily drafted will, in which he referred to Margaret as "my most entire belovyd wyff".

== Illness ==
Henry is believed to have suffered from the skin disease erysipelas, also known as "St Anthony's Fire" and thought at the time to be a form of leprosy. In the last few years of his life, he was sometimes so ill that Reginald Bray had to take over his responsibilities.

== Death ==
Although he had chosen the winning side, Henry was seriously wounded at Barnet and did not return to London with the victorious army. On 17 April, Margaret hurried from Woking to London and sent a rider to Barnet for news of her husband. Henry was taken home, but never recovered from his wounds and died in his bed on 4 October 1471. Reginald Bray organized his burial at Pleshey.

== In historical fiction and television ==
Henry appears as a character in Philippa Gregory's series of novels The Cousins' War and is played by Michael Maloney in the BBC drama The White Queen, which is based on the novels. Stafford's relationship with Margaret is portrayed in the TV series as heavily strained, with Stafford torn between his obvious concern for his wife's well-being and his exasperation with her fanatical nature, given that he supported the Yorkists despite his wife's loyalty to the Lancastrians.
