= Anne Neville, Duchess of Buckingham =

English noblewoman (c. 1408–1480)

Anne Neville
- Duchess of Buckingham; Baroness Mountjoy
- Born: c. 1408
- Died: 20 September 1480
- Family: Neville
- Spouse: Humphrey Stafford, 1st Duke of Buckingham (m. 1424, d. 1460); Walter Blount, 1st Baron Mountjoy (m. 1467, d. 1474)
- Issue: Humphrey Stafford, Earl of Stafford; Sir Henry Stafford; John Stafford, 1st Earl of Wiltshire
- Father: Ralph Neville, 1st Earl of Westmorland
- Mother: Joan Beaufort

Anne Neville (c. 1408 – 20 September 1480) was a daughter of Ralph Neville, 1st Earl of Westmorland, and his second wife Lady Joan Beaufort. Her first husband was Humphrey Stafford, 1st Duke of Buckingham, and she was an important English noblewoman, landholder and book owner during the fifteenth century.

== Life ==
Anne was born around 1408, a daughter of Ralph Neville, 1st Earl of Westmoreland, and his second wife Lady Joan Beaufort, the legitimised daughter of John of Gaunt, 1st Duke of Lancaster. Sometime before October 1424 she married Humphrey Stafford, 1st Duke of Buckingham, heir of Edmund Stafford, 5th Earl of Stafford, and one of the wealthiest men in England.

Through her first marriage, Anne became a significant landholder. She managed the estates and financial matters with some success: the revenue of her dower lands increased notably under her direction. Drawing an annual income of £884 in 1460, the year she became a widow, the revenue increased by 40% to £1,245 by 1473, when her grandson Henry Stafford, 2nd Duke of Buckingham came of age.

She was widowed in 1460 when Humphrey was killed at the Battle of Northampton and remained unmarried until 1467. In that year she took as her second husband Walter Blount, 1st Baron Mountjoy (d. 1474). His will suggests that a prenuptial agreement was put in place at that time for he left Anne "all such goods as were her proper goods the day afore our marriage or that she hath brought since or to her given by any person".

As the Dowager Duchess of Buckingham she bore the train of queen consort Elizabeth Woodville at her coronation on 26 May 1465.

== Book ownership ==
Like many noblewomen of her age, Anne was highly educated and she has become associated with book collecting. She owned the Wingfield Hours, a psalter that includes a prayer identifying Anne as the owner. Her will contains a number of books in both English and French. These were passed on to her daughter-in-law Margaret Beaufort, Countess of Stafford, and daughter of Edmund Beaufort, 2nd Duke of Somerset. The two women had exchanged books during the 1460s when Margaret and her husband Humphrey moved close to Anne in Surrey.

== Ancestry ==
Ancestors of Anne Neville, Duchess of Buckingham

8. Ralph Neville, 2nd Baron Neville de Raby
4. John Neville, 3rd Baron Neville de Raby
9. Alice Audley
2. Ralph Neville, 1st Earl of Westmorland
10. Henry de Percy, 2nd Baron Percy of Alnwick
5. Maud Percy
11. Idonea Clifford
1. Anne Neville, Duchess of Buckingham
12. Edward III of England
6. John of Gaunt, 1st Duke of Lancaster
13. Philippa of Hainault
3. Joan Beaufort
14. Sir Payne de Roet
7. Katherine Swynford
