= Humphrey Stafford, 1st Duke of Buckingham =

English military leader (1402–1460)

His Grace The Duke of Buckingham KG
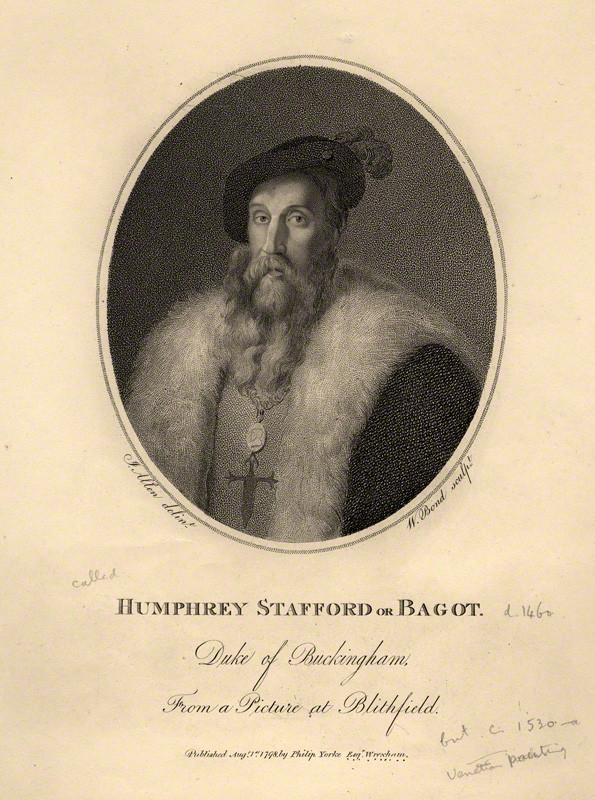

Lord High Constable of England
- In office 1456–1460
- Monarch: Henry VI
- Preceded by: Richard of York, 3rd Duke of York
- Succeeded by: John Tiptoft, 1st Earl of Worcester
- In office 1455–1455
- Preceded by: Edmund Beaufort, 2nd Duke of Somerset
- Succeeded by: Richard of York, 3rd Duke of York

Lord Warden of the Cinque Ports
- In office 1450–1459
- Preceded by: James Fiennes, 1st Baron Saye and Sele
- Succeeded by: Richard Woodville, 1st Earl Rivers

Ambassador to France
- In office 1446–1446

Captain of Calais
- In office 1441–1451
- Preceded by: Sir Thomas Kyriell
- Succeeded by: Edmund Beaufort, 2nd Duke of Somerset

Constable of France and Governor of Paris
- In office 1432–1436

Lieutenant-General of Normandy
- In office 1430–1432

Personal details
- Born: 15 August 1402 Stafford, Staffordshire
- Died: 10 July 1460 (aged 57) Northampton, Northamptonshire
- Resting place: Grey Friars, Northampton
- Spouse: Lady Anne Neville
- Relations: Stafford Family
- Children: 12, including: Humphrey Stafford, Earl of Stafford; Sir Henry Stafford; John Stafford, 1st Earl of Wiltshire
- Parents: Edmund Stafford, 5th Earl of Stafford; Anne of Gloucester

Humphrey Stafford, 1st Duke of Buckingham, 6th Earl of Stafford, 7th Baron Stafford (15 August 1402 – 10 July 1460) of Stafford Castle in Staffordshire, was an English nobleman and a military commander in the Hundred Years' War and the Wars of the Roses. Through his mother he was of royal descent from King Edward III, his great-grandfather, while from his father, he inherited, at an early age, the earldom of Stafford. By his marriage to a daughter of Ralph, Earl of Westmorland, Humphrey was related to the powerful Neville family and to many of the leading aristocratic houses of the time. He joined the English campaign in France with King Henry V in 1420. Following Henry V's death two years later he became a councillor for the new king, the nine-month-old Henry VI. Stafford acted as a peacemaker during the factional politics of the 1430s, when Humphrey, Duke of Gloucester, vied with Cardinal Beaufort for political supremacy. Stafford also took part in the eventual arrest of Gloucester in 1447.

Stafford returned to the French campaign during the 1430s, and for his loyalty he was elevated from Earl of Stafford to Duke of Buckingham. Around the same time, his mother died. As much of his estate—as her dower—had previously been in her hands, Humphrey went from having a reduced income in his early years to being one of the wealthiest and most powerful landowners in England. His lands stretched across much of the country, ranging from East Anglia to the Welsh border. Being such an important figure in the localities was not without its dangers and for some time he feuded violently with Sir Thomas Malory in the Midlands.

After returning from France, Stafford remained in England for the rest of his life, serving King Henry. He acted as the King's bodyguard and chief negotiator during Jack Cade's Rebellion of 1450, helping to suppress it. When the King's cousin, Richard, Duke of York, rebelled two years later, Stafford investigated York's followers. In 1453, the King became ill and sank into a catatonic state; law and order broke down further and when civil war began in 1455, Stafford fought for the King in the First Battle of St Albans which began the Wars of the Roses. Both were captured by the Yorkists and Stafford spent most of his final years attempting to mediate between the Yorkist and Lancastrian factions, the latter by now headed by Henry's wife, Margaret of Anjou. Partly due to a feud with a leading Yorkist—Richard Neville, Earl of Warwick—Stafford eventually declared for King Henry and the Duke of York was defeated in 1459, driving York into exile. When the rebels returned the following year they attacked the royal army at Northampton. Acting as the King's personal guard in the ensuing struggle, Stafford was killed and the King was again taken prisoner. Stafford's eldest son had died of plague two years earlier and the Buckingham dukedom descended to Stafford's five-year-old grandson, Henry, a ward of the King until he came of age in 1473.

== Background and youth ==
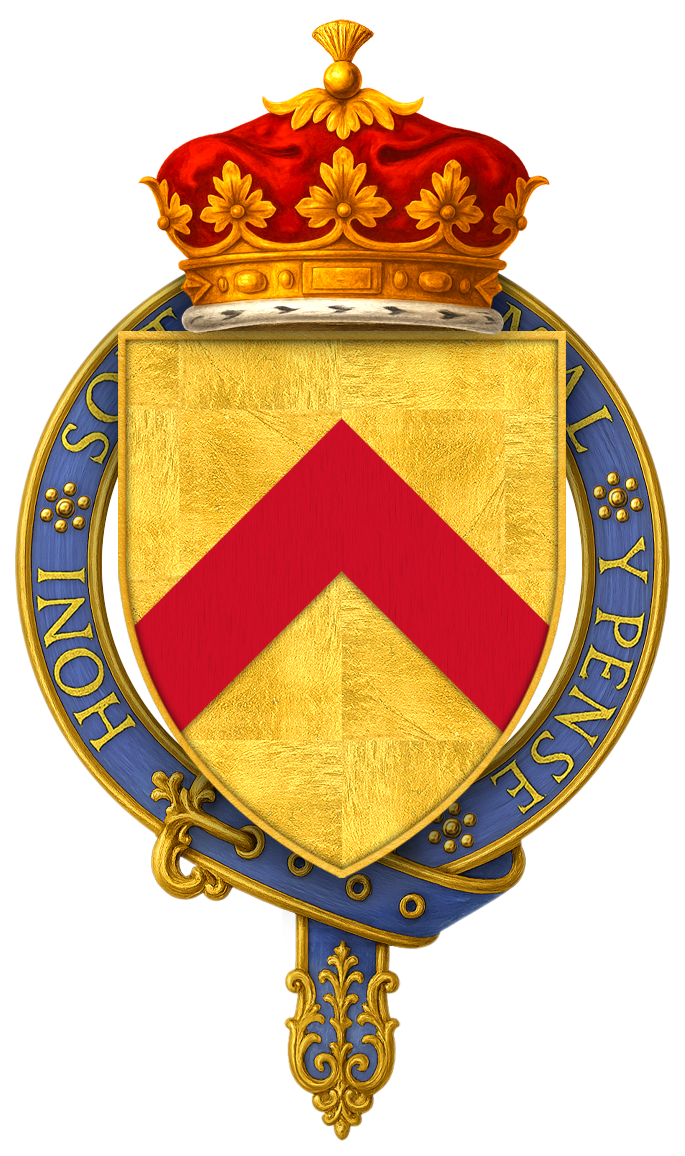
Arms of Sir Humphrey Stafford, 1st Duke of Buckingham, KG

Humphrey Stafford was born in Stafford on 15 August 1402. He was the only son of Edmund Stafford, 5th Earl of Stafford, and Anne of Gloucester, who was the daughter of Edward III's youngest son Thomas of Woodstock. This gave Humphrey royal descent, and made him a second cousin to the then king, Henry IV.

On 21 July 1403, when Humphrey was less than a year old, his father was killed fighting for Henry IV against the rebel Henry Hotspur at the Battle of Shrewsbury. Humphrey became 6th Earl of Stafford. With the earldom came a large estate with land in more than a dozen counties. Through her previous marriage to Edmund's older brother, Thomas, his mother accumulated two dowries, (Note: The legal concept of dower had existed since the late twelfth century as a means of protecting a woman from being left landless if her husband died first. He would, when they married, assign certain estates to her—a dos nominata, or dower. The amount was usually a third of everything he was seised of. By the fifteenth century, the widow was deemed entitled to her dower. Stafford's situation was not uncommon in the late middle ages. When Edmund Holland, 4th Earl of Kent, inherited the title from his childless brother Thomas in 1404, the estates had to support the dowers of their mother Alice, his brother's widow, Joan Stafford, and his aunt, Elizabeth of Lancaster, Duchess of Exeter. When Edmund died in 1408, his wife then became the fourth dowager on the inheritance. There being no male heirs though, it was broken up and divided amongst them and Edmund's five sisters.) each comprising a third of the Stafford estates. She occupied these lands for the next twenty years, and Humphrey received a reduced income of less than £1,260 a year until he came of age. As his mother could not, by law, be his guardian, Humphrey became a royal ward and was put under the guardianship of Henry IV's queen, Joan of Navarre. His minority lasted for the next twenty years.

== Early career ==
Although Stafford received a reduced inheritance, as the historian Carol Rawcliffe has put it, "fortunes were still to be made in the French wars". Stafford assumed the profession of arms. He fought with Henry V during the 1420 campaign in France and was knighted on 22 April the following year. On 31 August 1422, while campaigning, Henry V contracted dysentery and died. Stafford was present at his death and joined the entourage that returned to England with the royal corpse. When Stafford was later asked by the royal council if the King had left any final instructions regarding the governance of Normandy, he claimed that he had been too upset at the time to be able to remember. Stafford was still a minor, but parliament soon granted him livery of his father's estate, allowing him full possession. The grant was based on Stafford's claim that the King had orally promised him this before dying. The grant did not require him to pay a fee into the Exchequer, as was normal. (Note: The feudal system was based on the premise that all land belonged to the King. What was held directly by the King was the royal demesne. That which was granted away was held on his behalf by tenants-in-chief. If a tenant-in-chief died without leaving an adult heir who could immediately receive the inheritance, the estates escheated (returned to the King). The King would hold the estates until the heir (if any) reached his majority, at which point he would apply for livery of seisin: the right to enter his estates. Possession was usually obtained by paying a fine to the exchequer.)

The new king, Henry VI, was still only a baby, so the lords decided that the dead King's brothers—John, Duke of Bedford and Humphrey, Duke of Gloucester—would have to be prominent in this minority government. Bedford, it was decided, would rule as regent in France, while Gloucester would be chief councillor (although not protector) in England. Stafford became a member of the new royal council on its formation. It first met in November 1422 and Stafford was to be an assiduous attender for the next three years. Gloucester repeatedly claimed the title of Protector based on his relationship to the dead King. By 1424, the rivalry between him and his uncle Henry Beaufort, Bishop of Winchester—as de facto head of council—had become an outright conflict. Although Stafford seems to have personally favoured the interests of Gloucester in the latter's struggle for supremacy over Beaufort, Stafford attempted to be a moderating influence. For example, in October 1425, Archbishop of Canterbury Henry Chichele, Peter, Duke of Coimbra and Stafford helped to negotiate an end to a burst of violence that had erupted in London between followers of the two rivals. In 1428, when Gloucester again demanded an increase in his power, Stafford was one of the councillors who personally signed a strong statement to the effect that Gloucester's position had been formulated six years earlier, would not change now, and that in any case, the King would attain his majority within a few years. Stafford was also chosen by the council to inform Beaufort—now a Cardinal—that he was to absent himself from Windsor until it was decided if he could carry out his traditional duty of Prelate to the Order of the Garter now that Pope Martin V had promoted him.

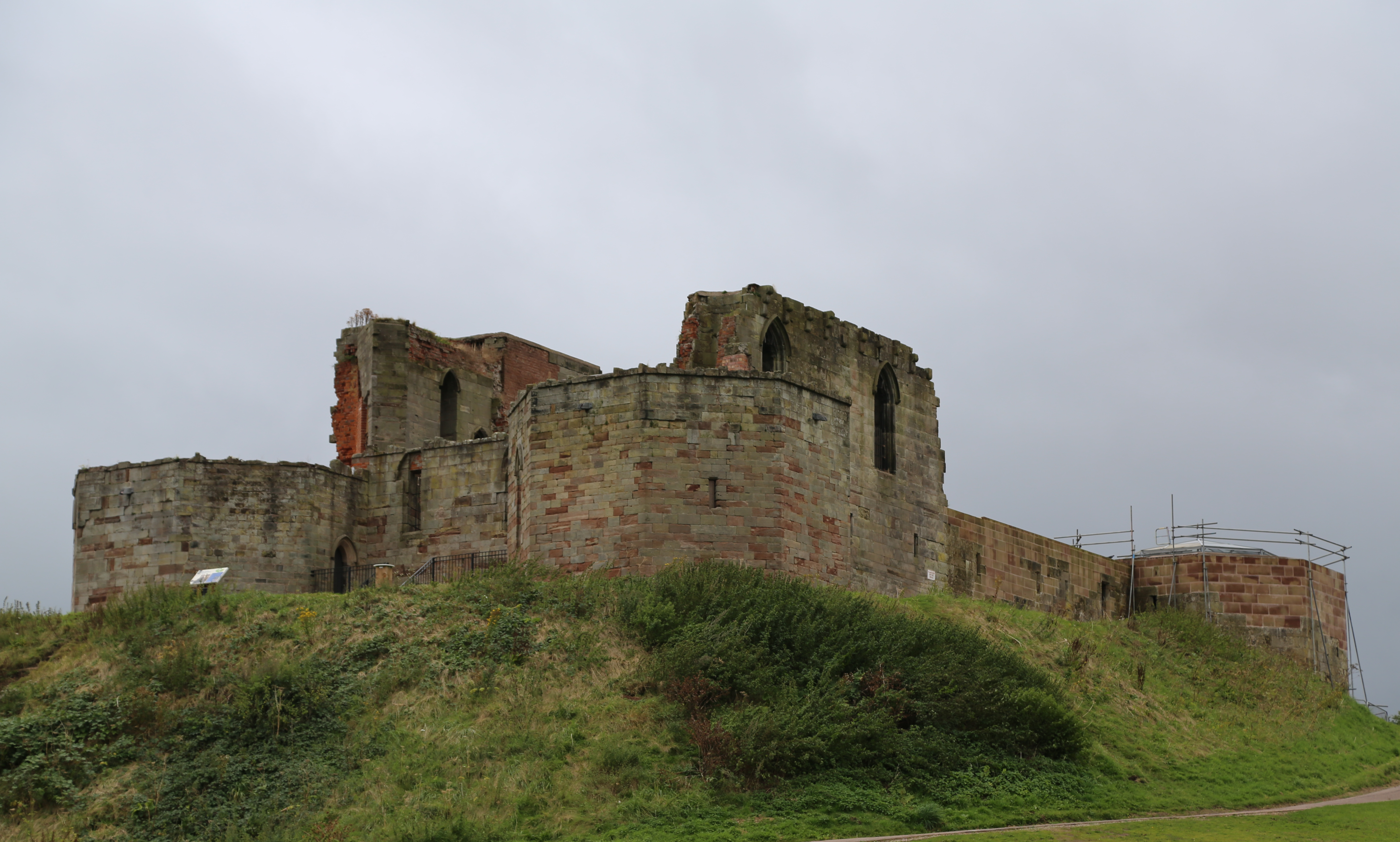
Stafford Castle, the Stafford family seat, as it remains in 2017

Stafford was made a Knight of the Order of the Garter in April 1429. The following year, he travelled to France with the King for Henry's French coronation, escorting him through the war-torn countryside. The Earl was appointed Lieutenant-General of Normandy, Governor of Paris, and Constable of France over the course of his next two years of service there. Apart from one occasion in November 1430 when he and Thomas Beaufort, Duke of Exeter took the English army to support Philip, Duke of Burgundy, Stafford's primary military role at this time was defending Paris and its environs. He also attended the interrogation of Joan of Arc in Rouen in 1431; at some point during these proceedings, a contemporary alleged, Stafford attempted to stab her and had to be physically restrained.

On 11 October 1431 the King created Stafford Count of Perche; (Note: A full list of Stafford's titles was drawn up in 1446 on a chief justices' roll.) he was to hold the title until the English finally withdrew from Normandy in 1450. The county was valued at 800 marks per annum, (Note: A medieval English mark was an accounting unit equivalent to two-thirds of a pound.) although the historian Michael Jones has suggested that due to the war, in real terms "the amount of revenue that could be extracted ... must have been considerably lower". Since Perche was a frontier region, in a state of almost constant conflict, whatever income the estate generated was immediately re-invested in its defence.

In England, the King's minority ended in 1436. In preparation for his personal rule, the council reorganised Henry's Lancastrian estates to be under the control of local magnates. This gave Stafford responsibility for much of the north Midlands, which was the largest single area of the duchy to be delegated among the nobility. This put the royal affinity—those men retained directly by the Crown to provide a direct link between the King and the localities—at his command.

=== Estates ===
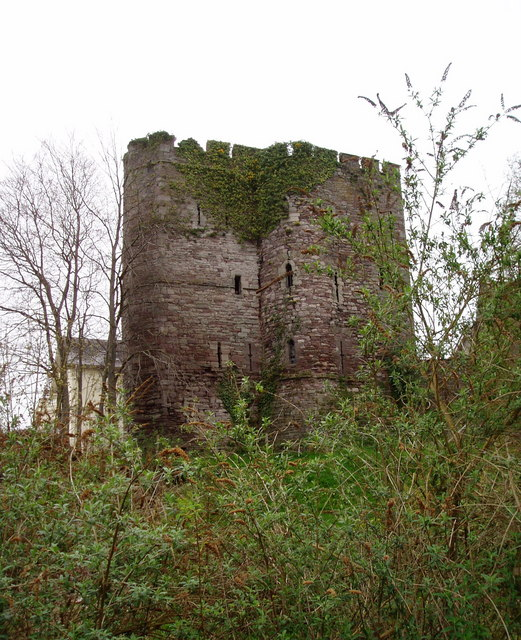
Brecon Castle in 2006; this was the Duke of Buckingham's traditional base in the Welsh Marches.

The centrepiece of Stafford's estates, and his own caput, was Stafford Castle. Here he maintained a permanent staff of at least forty people, as well as a large stable, and it was especially well-placed for recruiting retainers in the Welsh Marches, Staffordshire, and Cheshire. He also had manor houses at Writtle and Maxstoke, which he had purchased as part of most of the estates of John, Lord Clinton. Writtle was particularly favoured by the Earl, and they were both useful when the royal court was in Coventry. Likewise, he made his base at Tonbridge Castle when he was acting as Warden of the Cinque Ports or on commission in Kent. His Marcher castles—Caus, Hay, Huntington, and Bronllys—had, by the 1450s, generally fallen into disrepair, and his other border castles, such as Brecon and Newport, he rarely used. Stafford's Thornbury manor was convenient for Bristol and was a stopping point to and from London. (Note: Christian Woolgar has noted that, by this period, noble families were less peripatetic than they had been in the Early Middle Ages, and were tending to spend a greater amount of their time on fewer manors; Buckingham, he says, "spent much time at Writtle and Maxstoke".)

Stafford's mother's death in 1438 transformed his fiscal position. He now received the remainder of his father's estates—worth about £1,500—and his mother's half of the de Bohun inheritance, which was worth another £1,200. The latter also included the earldom of Buckingham, worth £1,000 on its own; Stafford had become one of the greatest landowners in England overnight. "His landed resources matched his titles", explained Albert Compton-Reves, scattered as they were throughout England, Wales and Ireland, with only the King and Richard, Duke of York wealthier. One assessment of his estates suggests that, by the late 1440s, his income was over £5,000 per annum, and K. B. McFarlane estimated Stafford's total potential income from land to have been £6,300 gross annually, at its peak between 1447 and 1448. On the other hand, the actual yield may have been lower; around £3,700: rents, for example, were often difficult to collect. Even a lord of the status of Richard Neville, Earl of Warwick, owed Stafford over £100 in unpaid rent for the manor of Drayton Bassett in 1458. In the 1440s and 1450s, Stafford's Welsh estates were particularly notable for both their rent arrears and public disorder. Further—and like most nobles of the period—he substantially overspent, possibly, says Harriss, by as much as £300 a year. His treasurer, William Wistowe, when rendering his accounts for the years 1452–1453, noted that Stafford was owed £730 by his reckoning, some debts being 20 years old. Despite this, says Woolgar, "there [is] no suggestion that [Stafford] found it difficult to obtain cash or goods". (Note: One of the most luxurious contemporary foodstuffs—sugar—says Woolgar, is a good barometer of the health of a medieval cashflow. Buckingham's household, he notes, consumed 245 pounds (111 kilograms) of the stuff in 1452–1453. In comparison, less than 50 years earlier, Richard, Bishop of Chichester, had used 50 pounds (23 kilograms) in 1406.)

=== Affinity and problems in the localities ===
In the late medieval period, all great lords created an affinity between themselves and groups of supporters, who often lived and travelled with them for purposes of mutual benefit and defence, and Humphrey Stafford was no exception. These men were generally his estate tenants, who could be called upon when necessary for soldiering, as well as other duties, and were often retained by indenture. (Note: K. B. McFarlane uses the example of John of Gaunt to illustrate the wide variety of staff that could be indentured; Gaunt contracted with, among others, his surgeons, chaplains, clerk, falconer, cook, minstrels, heralds, and legal counsels. Buckingham retained physician Thomas Edmond to be available at all times with three horses, a yeoman, and a page, for which Edmond received £10 in wages.) In the late 1440s his immediate affinity was at least ten knights and twenty-seven esquires, mainly drawn from Cheshire. By the 1450s—a period beginning with political tension and ending with civil war—Stafford retained men specifically "to sojourn and ride" with him. His affinity was probably composed along the lines laid out by royal ordinance at the time which dictated the nobility should be accompanied by no more than 240 men, including "forty gentlemen, eighty yeomen and a variety of lesser individuals", suggested T. B. Pugh, although in peacetime Stafford would have required far fewer. It was directly due to the political climate that this increased, especially after 1457. Stafford's household more generally has been estimated at 150 people by about 1450, and it has been estimated that maintaining both his affinity and household cost him over £900 a year.

Maxstoke Castle, purchased by Stafford from Lord Clinton

Along with Richard Beauchamp, Earl of Warwick, Stafford was the major magnatial influence in Warwickshire, so when Beauchamp left for a lengthy tour of duty in France, in 1437, Stafford became the centre of regional power stretching from Warwickshire to Derbyshire. He was sufficiently involved in the royal court and government that he was often unable to attend to the needs of his region. This caused him local difficulties; on 5 May 1430 a Leicestershire manor of Stafford's was attacked and he faced problems in Derbyshire in the 1440s, although there, Helen Castor has said, Stafford "made no attempt to restore peace, nor made any attempt to intervene at all". Stafford also had major estates on the Welsh Marches. This area was prone to regular lawlessness and particularly occupied his time as a royal justice.

One of the best-known disputes Stafford had with his local gentry was in his Midlands heartlands. This was with Sir Thomas Malory. On 4 January 1450, Malory, with twenty-six other armed men, waited for Stafford near Coombe Abbey woods—near the Stafford's Newbold estate—intending to ambush him. Stafford fought back, repelling Malory's small force with sixty yeomenry. In another episode, Malory stole deer from the earl's park at Caludon. Stafford personally arrested Malory on 25 July 1451. The Earl also ended up in a dispute with William Ferrers of Staffordshire, even though the region was the centre of Stafford's authority and where he may have expected to be strongest. Ferrers had recently been appointed to the county King's Bench and attempted to assert political control over the county as a result. Following Cade's rebellion in 1450, Stafford's park at Penshurst was attacked by local men whom the historian Ralph Griffiths describes as "concealing their faces with long beards and charcoal-blackened faces, calling themselves servants of the queen of the fairies". Towards the end of the decade, not only was he unable to prevent feuding amongst the local gentry, but his own affinity was in discord. This may in part be due to the fact that at this time he was not spending much of his time in the Midlands, preferring to stay close to London and the King, dwelling either at his manors of Tonbridge or Writtle.

== Later career ==
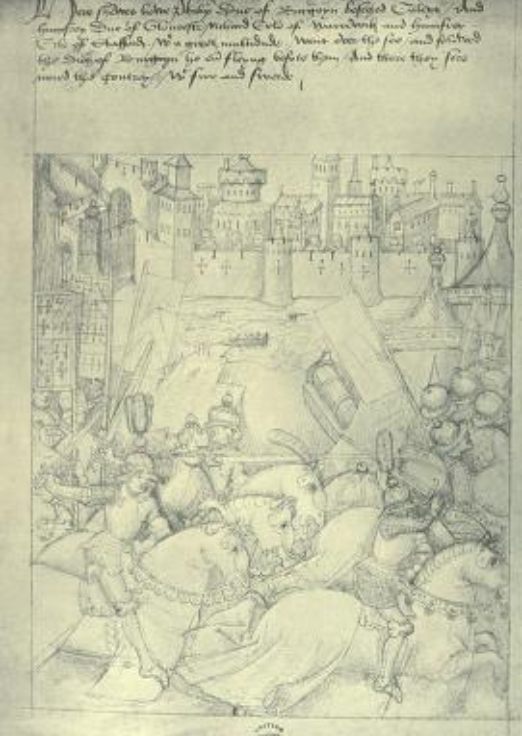
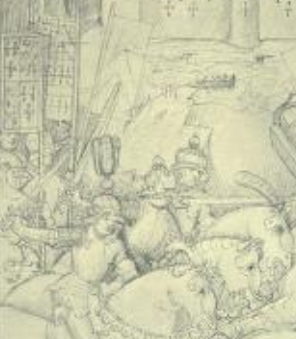
- Rouse's text reads: Here shewes howe Philip Duc of Burgoyn beseged Caleys/ And humfrey Duc of Gloucester Richard Erle of Warrewik and humfrey Erle of Stafford. w' a greet multitude. went over the see/ and folowed the Duc of Burgoyn he ever fleyng before them / And there they sore nioed the Contrey. w' fire and swerd. — John Rouse, Beauchamp Pageant

In July 1436, Stafford, accompanied by Gloucester, John de Mowbray, 2nd Duke of Norfolk, John Holland Earl of Huntingdon, the Earl of Warwick, Thomas de Courtenay, 5th/13th Earl of Devon, and James Butler, 4th Earl of Ormond, returned to France again with an army of nearly 8,000 men. Although the expedition's purpose was to end the siege of Calais by Philip, Duke of Burgundy, the Burgundians had withdrawn before they arrived, leaving behind a quantity of cannon for the English to seize. Subsequent peace talks in France occupied Stafford throughout 1439, and in 1442 he was appointed Captain of Calais and the Risbanke fort, and was indentureed to serve for the next decade. Before his departure for Calais in September 1442, the garrison had revolted and seized the Staple's wool in lieu of unpaid wages. Stafford received a pledge from the council that if such a situation arose again during his tenure, he would not be held responsible. In light of the secrecy that cloaked Stafford's appointment in 1442, suggests David Grummitt, it is possible that the revolt had actually been staged by his servants to ensure that Stafford "had entry [to Calais] on favourable terms". Stafford himself emphasised the need to restore order there in his original application for the office. He also received another important allowance, being granted permission to export gold and jewels (up to the value of £5,000 per trip) for his use in France, even though the export of bullion was illegal at the time. He served the full term of his appointment as Calais captain, leaving office in 1451.

Around 1435, Stafford was granted the Honour of Tutbury, which he held until 1443. Then, says Griffiths, Buckingham proceeded to transfer it to one of his councillor's sons. (Note: Tutbury did not remain within his influence for long; in 1444 the King granted it to his childhood companion Henry, Duke of Warwick. The historian Christine Carpenter has commented that, for Stafford, "the prospect of [Tutbury's] eventual alienation to someone who was then so young, whose interests in the north midlands were nothing like as strong as his own, and the eventual exclusion of any other grantees, including the Staffords, must have seemed profoundly insulting to Humphrey". Carpenter suggests, though, that the transfer of the honour to Beauchamp should be seen as a favour to Beauchamp rather than an explicit criticism of Stafford.) Other offices he held around this time included Seneschal of Halton from 1439, and Lieutenant of the Marches from 1442 to 1451. Stafford became less active on the council around the same time. He became Lord Warden of the Cinque Ports, Constable of Dover Castle and Constable of Queenborough, on the Isle of Sheppey, in 1450. He again represented the Crown during further peace talks with the French in 1445 and 1446.

In the event, Stafford rarely visited Calais. Factional strife had continued intermittently between Beaufort and Gloucester, and Stafford—who had also been appointed Constable of England—was by now firmly in the Beaufort camp. In 1442, he had been on the committee that investigated and convicted Gloucester's wife, Eleanor Cobham, of witchcraft, and five years later he arrested the Duke at Bury St Edmunds on 18 February 1447 for treason. Like many others, Stafford profited substantially from Gloucester's fall: when the latter's estates were divided up, the "major prizes" went to the court nobility.

In September 1444, as reward for his loyal and continuous service to the Crown, he was created Duke of Buckingham. By then he was already describing himself as "the Right Mighty Prince Humphrey Earl of Buckingham, Hereford, Stafford, Northampton and Perche, Lord of Brecknock and Holdernesse". Three years later he was granted precedence over all English dukes not of royal blood. Despite his income and titles he was consistently heavily out of pocket. Although rarely in Calais, he was responsible for ensuring the garrison was paid, and it has been estimated that when he resigned and returned from the post in 1450, he was owed over £19,000 in back wages. This was such a large amount that he was granted the wool trade tax from the port of Sandwich, Kent, until it was paid off. His other public offices also forced him to spend over his annual income, and he had household costs of over £2,000. He was also a substantial creditor to the government, which was perennially short of cash.

With the outbreak of Jack Cade's rebellion, Buckingham summoned about seventy of his tenants from Staffordshire to accompany him while he was in London in May 1450. He was one of the lords commissioned to arrest the rebels as part of a forceful government response on 6 June 1450, and he acted as a negotiator with the insurgents at Blackheath ten days later. The promises that Buckingham made on behalf of the government were not kept, and Cade's army invaded London. After the eventual defeat of the rebellion, Buckingham headed an investigatory commission designed to pacify rebellious Kent, and in November that year he rode noisily through London—with a retinue of around 1,500 armed men—with the King and other peers, in a demonstration of royal authority intended to deter potential troublemakers in the future. Following the rebellion, Buckingham and his retinue often acted as a bodyguard to the King.

== Wars of the Roses ==
In 1451, the King's favourite, Edmund Beaufort, Duke of Somerset, replaced William de la Pole, 1st Duke of Suffolk as the King's chief councillor, and Buckingham supported Somerset's government. At the same time, he tried to maintain peace between Somerset and York, who by now was Somerset's bitter enemy. When York rebelled in 1452 and confronted the King with a large army at Dartford, Buckingham was again a voice of compromise and, since he had contributed heavily towards the size of the King's army, his voice was heeded. Buckingham took part in a peace commission on 14 February that month in Devon, which prevented Thomas Courtenay, Earl of Devon from joining York at Dartford. A year later, in August 1453, King Henry became ill, and slipped into a catatonic state; government slowly broke down. At Christmas, Buckingham personally presented the King's son—the newly born Edward, Prince of Wales—to the King. But Henry remained unable to respond. Buckingham took part in the council meeting which resulted in the arrest and subsequent year-long imprisonment of the Duke of Somerset. In the February 1454 parliament Buckingham was appointed Steward of England, although Griffiths called this position "largely honorific". This parliament also appointed York as Protector of the Realm from 27 March 1454. Buckingham supported York's protectorate, attending York's councils more frequently than most of his fellow councillors. The King recovered his health in January 1455, and, soon after, Somerset was released—or may have escaped—from the Tower. A contemporary commented how Buckingham "straungely conveied" Somerset from prison, but it is uncertain whether this was as a result of the King ordering his release or whether Somerset escaped with Buckingham's connivance. Buckingham may well by now have been expecting war to break out, because the same year he ordered the purchase of 2,000 cognizances—his personal badge of the 'Stafford knot'—even though strictly the distribution of livery was illegal.

=== Battle of St Albans ===
Following the King's recovery, York was either dismissed from or resigned his protectorship, and together with his Neville allies, withdrew from London to their northern estates. Somerset—in charge of government once again—summoned a Great Council to meet in Leicester on 22 May 1455. The Yorkists believed they would be arrested or attainted at this meeting. As a result, they gathered a small force and marched south. The King, with a smaller force that nonetheless included important nobles such as Somerset, Northumberland, Clifford, Buckingham, and Buckingham's son Humphrey, Earl of Stafford, was likewise marching from Westminster to Leicester, and in the early morning of 22 May, royal scouts reported the Yorkists as being only a few hours away. Buckingham urged that they push on to St Albans—so that the King might dine—which was not particularly easy to defend. (Note: For example, it had no walls, only a defensible ditch, and access to the south of the main street was easy.) Buckingham also assumed that York would want to parley before launching an assault on the King, as he had in 1452. The decision to head for the town and not make a stand straight away may have been a tactical error; the contemporary Short English Chronicle describes how the Lancastrians "strongly barred and arrayed for defence" immediately after they arrived.

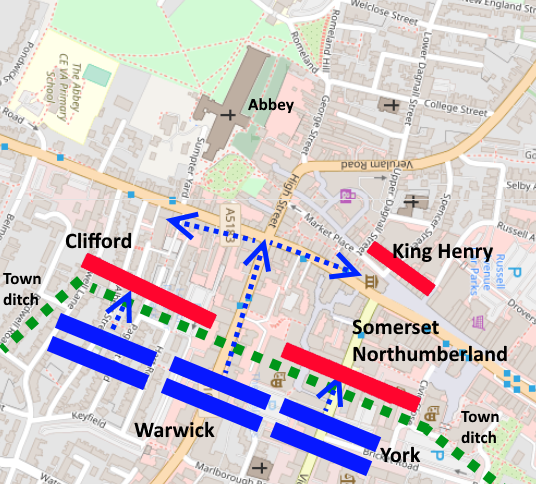
Estimated disposition of the Yorkist (blue) and Lancastrian (red) armies at the first Battle of St Albans, 22 May 1455

The King was lodged in the town and York, with the Yorkists under Richard Neville, 5th Earl of Salisbury and his son Richard, Earl of Warwick, encamped to the south. Negotiations commenced immediately. York demanded that Somerset be released into his custody, and the King replaced Somerset as Lord High Constable with Buckingham, making Somerset subordinate. In that capacity, Buckingham became the King's personal negotiator—Armstrong suggests because he was well known to be able to "concede but not capitulate"—and received and responded to the Yorkists' messengers. His strategy was to play for time, both to prepare the town's defences and to await the arrival of loyalist bishops, who could be counted on to bring the moral authority of the church to bear on the Yorkists. Buckingham received at least three Yorkist embassies, but the King—or Buckingham—refused to give in to the main Yorkist demand, that Somerset be surrendered to them. Buckingham may have hoped that repeated negotiations would deplete the Yorkists' zest for battle, and delay long enough for reinforcements to arrive. Buckingham made what John Gillingham described as an "insidiously tempting suggestion" that the Yorkists mull over the King's responses in Hatfield or Barnet overnight. Buckingham's confidence in how reasonable the Yorkists would be was misplaced.

The Yorkists realised what Buckingham—"prevaricating with courtesy", says Armstrong—was trying to do and battle commenced while negotiations were still taking place: Warwick launched a surprise attack at around 10 AM. Buckingham commanded the King's army of 2,500 men, although his coordination of the town's defence was problematic, giving the initiative to the Yorkists. Although the defences that Buckingham had organised successfully checked the Yorkists' initial advance, Warwick took his force through gardens and houses to attack the Lancastrians in the rear. The battle was soon over, and had lasted between half an hour and an hour with only about 50 casualties. These included senior Lancastrian captains: Somerset, Northumberland, and Clifford, were killed. (Note: A contemporary chronicler observed how "when the said lords were dead, the battle was ceased". Historian C. A. J. Armstrong suggested that this may indicate that the Lancastrian lords' deaths were less an accident of war and more an "act of private revenge on a few prominent individuals" by York and the Nevilles.) Buckingham himself was wounded three times in the face by arrows—and sought sanctuary in the abbey. (Note: James Butler, 5th Earl of Ormond, had also taken refuge with the King and Buckingham, but escaped as the Yorkists approached; he was reported to have fled dressed in the garb of a monk, discarding his armour as he went.) His son appears to have been badly wounded. A chronicler reported that some Yorkist soldiers, intent on looting, entered the abbey to kill Buckingham, but that the Duke was saved by York's personal intervention. In any case, says Harriss, Buckingham was probably captured with the King, although he was still able to reward 90 of his retainers from Kent, Sussex, and Surrey. It is not known for certain whether these men had actually fought with him at St Albans; as K. B. McFarlane points out, many retinues did not arrive in time to fight.

== Last years ==
York now had the political upper hand, made himself Constable of England and kept the King as a prisoner, returning to the role of Protector when Henry became ill again. Buckingham swore to "draw the lyne" with York, and supported his second protectorate, although losing Queen Margaret's favour as a result. A contemporary wrote that in April 1456 the Duke returned to his Writtle manor, not looking "well plesid". Buckingham played an important role at the October 1456 Great Council in Leicester. Here, with other lords, he tried to persuade the King to impose a settlement, and at the same time declared that anyone who resorted to violence would receive "ther deserte"—which included any who attacked York.

In 1459, with other lords, he renewed his oath of loyalty to the King and Prince of Wales. Until this point he had been a voice of restraint within the King's faction. But he had been restored to the Queen's favour that year and—as she was the de facto leader of the party—his realignment was decisive enough that it ultimately hastened the outbreak of hostilities again. Buckingham may also have been partially motivated by financial needs, and encouraged to do so by those retainers reliant on him. He had a bigger retinue than almost any other noble in England and was still the only one who could match York in power and income. This was demonstrated at the Battle of Ludford Bridge in October 1459, where his army played a decisive part in the defeat of the Yorkist forces. Following their defeat, York and the Neville earls fled Ludlow and went into exile; York to Ireland, the earls to Calais. They were attainted at the Coventry parliament later that year, and their estates distributed amongst the Crown's supporters. Buckingham was rewarded by the King with extensive grants from the estates of Sir William Oldhall, worth about £800 per annum. With York in exile, Buckingham was granted custody of York's wife, Cecily, Duchess of York, whom, a chronicler reports, he treated harshly in her captivity.

=== Death at Northampton ===
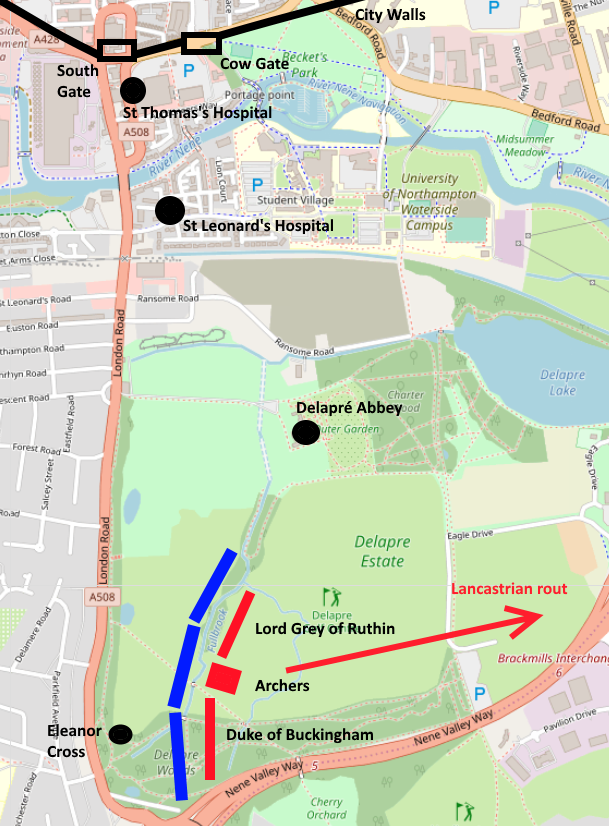
Estimated positions of the Yorkist and Lancastrian armies at Northampton, 10 July 1460

From the moment the Duke of York and the Neville earls left England it was obvious to the government that they would return; the only question was when. After a series of false alarms in early 1460, they eventually did so in June, landing at Sandwich, Kent. They immediately marched on, and entered London; the King, with Buckingham and other lords, was in Coventry, and on hearing of the earls' arrival, moved the court to Northampton. The Yorkists left London and marched to the King; they were accompanied by the Papal legate Francesco Coppini. In the lead up to the Battle of Northampton, the Earl of Warwick and Edward, Earl of March sent envoys to negotiate, but Buckingham—once again the King's chief negotiator, and backed by his son-in-law, John Talbot and Lords Beaumont and Egremont—was no longer conciliatory. Buckingham denied the Yorkists' envoys' repeated requests for an audience with Henry, denouncing the earls: "the Earl of Warwick shall not come to the King's presence and if he comes he shall die". Buckingham condemned the bishops who had accompanied the Yorkist army as well, telling them that they were not men of peace, but men of war, and there could now be no peace with Warwick. Personal animosity as much as political judgment was responsible for Buckingham's attitude, possibly, suggests Rawcliffe, the result of Warwick's earlier rent evasion. Buckingham's influential voice was chief among those demanding a military response to Warwick and March; the Duke may also have misinterpreted the Yorkists' requests to negotiate as a sign of weakness, seeing the coming battle as an opportunity to settle scores with Warwick. But Buckingham misjudged both the size of the Yorkist army—which outnumbered that of the King—and the loyalty of the Lancastrian army. Whatever plans Buckingham had, says Carol Rawcliffe, they "ended abruptly" on the battlefield.

Buckingham's men dug in outside Northampton's southern walls, and fortified behind a tributary of the River Nene, close to Delapré Abbey. Battle was joined early on 10 July 1460. Although it was expected to be a drawn-out affair—due to the near-impregnability of the royal position—it was shortened considerably when Lord Edmund Grey of Ruthin turned traitor to the King. Grey "welcomed the Yorkists over the barricades" on the Lancastrian wing and ordered his men to lay down arms, allowing the Yorkists access to the King's camp. Within half an hour, the battle was over. By 2:00 pm, Buckingham, John Talbot, 2nd Earl of Shrewsbury, Lord Egremont and Viscount Beaumont, had all been killed by a force of Kentishmen. The Duke was buried shortly after at Grey Friars Abbey in Northampton.

Buckingham had named his wife Anne sole executrix of his will. She was instructed to provide 200 marks to any clergy who attended his funeral, the remainder being distributed as poor relief. She was also to organise the establishment of two chantries in his memory and, says Barbara Harriss, he left "exceedingly elaborate" instructions for the augmentation of Pleshy college. (Note: The college had been founded within Holy Trinity parish church by Thomas, Duke of Gloucester in 1394, and on his death, it had been inherited by his daughter, Buckingham's mother, and eventually passed to the duke himself. The Victoria County History describes how the college was to be "augmented by three priests and six poor men, its possessions increased with lands to the amount of 100 marks yearly and a chapel built on the north side of the church, in which mass was to be said daily". Anne seems to have done little regarding Buckingham's wishes until 1467, when, with her second husband Walter, Lord Mountjoy, she received licence to grant the college an estate worth about 40 marks per annum. The church was almost completely rebuilt in 1888, but some of the central arches remain of the original 14th-century building.)

== Aftermath ==
Michael Hicks has noted that Buckingham was one of the few Lancastrian loyalists who was never accused by the Yorkists of being an "evil councillor", even though he was—in Hicks's words—"the substance and perhaps the steel within the ruling regime". Although Buckingham was not attainted when the Duke of York's son, Edward, Earl of March, took the throne as King Edward IV in 1461, Buckingham's grandson Henry became a royal ward, which gave the King control of the Stafford estates during the young duke's minority. Henry Stafford entered into his estates in 1473 but was executed by Edward's brother Richard—by then King, and against whom Henry had rebelled—in November 1483.

== Character ==
Humphrey Stafford has been described as something of a hothead in his youth, and later in life he was a staunch anti-Lollard. Lustig suggests that it was probably in connection to this that Sir Thomas Malory attempted his assassination around 1450—if indeed he did, as the charge was never proved. Buckingham did not lack the traits traditionally expected of the nobility in this period of the time, particularly, in dispute resolution, that of resorting to violence as a first rather than last resort. For instance, in September 1429, following an altercation with his brother-in-law the Earl of Huntingdon, he arrived at parliament fully armed. On the other hand, he was also a literary patron: Lord Scrope presented him with a copy of Christine de Pizan's Epistle of Othea, demonstrating his position as a "powerful and potentially powerful patron", and its dedicatory verse to Buckingham is particularly laudatory. On Buckingham's estates—especially on the Welsh marches—he has been described as a "harsh and exacting landlord" in the lengths he went to in maximising his income. He was also competent in his land deals, and seems never—unlike some contemporaries—to have had to sell land to stay solvent.

B. J. Harris noted that, although he died a staunch Lancastrian, he never showed any personal dislike of York in the 1450s, and that his personal motivation throughout the decade was loyalty to the Crown and keeping the peace between his peers. Rawcliffe has suggested that although he was inevitably going to be involved in the high politics of the day, Buckingham "lacked the necessary qualities ever to become a great statesman or leader ... [he] was in many ways an unimaginative and unlikeable man". On the latter quality, Rawcliffe points to his reputation as a harsh taskmaster on his estates and his "offensive behaviour" towards Joan of Arc. Further, she says, his political judgement could be clouded by his attitude. His temper, she says, was "ungovernable".

== Family ==
Humphrey Stafford married Lady Anne Neville, daughter of Ralph Neville, Earl of Westmorland, by Lady Joan Beaufort (Westmorland's second wife), at some point before 18 October 1424. Anne Neville was a literary patron in her own right, also receiving a dedication in a copy of Scrope's translated Othea. On her death in 1480, she left many books in her will. (Note: Anne lists her still-living children in her will of 1480: her "son Buckingham"—meaning her grandson Henry—and "my daughter Beaumond", "my son of Wiltshire", "my daughter of Richmond" and "my daughter Mountjoy".) Scholars generally agree that Buckingham and Anne had twelve children, consisting of seven sons and five daughters. Sources conflict over the precise details of the Staffords' progeny. (Note: As Harald Kleinschmidt has noted, "determining the precise age of a person was difficult because birth dates were rarely recorded before the nineteenth century and because baptism was usually dated in terms of the day and the month, but not of the year in which it had occurred". Further, says Hugh M. Thomas, there is an "inherent difficulty of calculating birth dates from life events" such as marriages.) The antiquarian I. W. Dunham, writing in 1907, listed them as Humphrey, Henry, John, Anne (married Aubrey de Vere), Joan (married Viscount Beaumont before 1461), Elizabeth, Margaret (born about 1435, married Robert Dinham), (Note: The Dinhams were one of the wealthiest gentry families in Devon of the period.) and Katherine (married John Talbot, the future 3rd Earl of Shrewsbury, before 1467). (Note: Dunham, however, says that Humphrey was killed at the battle of St Albans in 1455, rather than dying in 1458 (either from wounds sustained in the battle or of plague).) James Tait lists the daughters as Anne, Joan, Elizabeth, Margaret and Catherine and suggests that Elizabeth and Margaret never married. (Note: The suggestion is by omission.) Rawcliffe gives the following as dates of birth and death for three of the daughters: Anne, 1446–1472; Joan, 1442–1484; and Katherine, 1437–1476. Edward and the twins, George and William, died young. The seventh son has gone unremarked in the sources.

The Stafford knot, the cognizance of the earls of Stafford and dukes of Buckingham, worn by their retainers to indicate their allegiance

The marriages Buckingham arranged for his children were structured around strengthening his ties to the Lancastrian royal family. Of particular importance were the marriages of two of his sons, Humphrey and Henry. They married into the Beaufort family, which was descended from the illegitimate children of John of Gaunt and thus of royal blood. There was also, about 1450, discussion regarding a proposal for one of Buckingham's daughters to marry the Dauphin of France (subsequently Louis XI). (Note: Tait suggests that the proposal was in regard to Buckingham's eldest daughter while Rawcliffe indicates it was in respect to Anne. The two authors are in conflict as to Anne being the eldest daughter.) Had it proceeded, it would have again linked the French Crown with the Lancastrian regime.

Buckingham's eldest son, Humphrey, married Margaret Beaufort. She was the daughter of Edmund Beaufort, Duke of Somerset, and Eleanor Beauchamp. Margaret and Humphrey's son was Buckingham's eventual heir. A second link to the Beaufort family was between Buckingham's second son, Sir Henry Stafford (c. 1425–1471), who became the third husband of Lady Margaret Beaufort, daughter of John Beaufort, Duke of Somerset, and Margaret Beauchamp. Margaret Beaufort had previously been married to Edmund Tudor, the eldest half-brother of Henry VI, and had given birth to the future King Henry VII two months after Edmund's death. She and Henry were childless. Buckingham's third surviving son, John (died 8 May 1473) married Constance Green of Drayton, who had previously been the duke's ward. Humphrey Stafford assigned them the manor of Newton Blossomville at the time of their marriage. John was created Earl of Wiltshire in 1470.

Buckingham arranged good but costly marriages for three of his daughters. Anne married Aubrey de Vere, son of John de Vere, Earl of Oxford. Their 1452 marriage cost Buckingham 2,300 marks; he was slow to pay, and still owed Oxford over £440 seven years later. In 1452, Joan married William Beaumont, heir of Viscount Beaumont. Katherine married John Talbot, Earl of Shrewsbury, six years later. Buckingham had apparently promised to give them £1,000 but died before acting on the promise.

== Cultural references and portrayals ==
Buckingham was depicted, during his son's lifetime, "mounted in battle array"—showing him during the 1436 campaign against Burgundy—in the pictorial genealogy, the Beauchamp Pageant. (Note: According to the British Library, the Pageant was probably compiled by the antiquarian John Rouse, under the patronage of Anne, Countess of Warwick, daughter of Richard Beauchamp, in 1485. The Beauchamp Pageant is currently held by the library as BL Cotton MS Julius, e iv. They describe the Pageant as "the only illustrated biography of a secular figure to have survived from the late middle ages".While Rouse is generally held to be the Pageant's compiler, this has not been established with certainty.)

Timothy J. Lustig has suggested that Thomas Malory, in his Morte d'Arthur, based his character Gawaine on Buckingham. Lustig suggests that Malory may have viewed the Duke as being "peacemaker and warlord, warrior and judge"—qualities which the writer also ascribed to his Arthurian character. Buckingham appears in Shakespeare's Henry VI, Part 2 (c. 1591), in which his character conspires in the downfall and disgrace of Eleanor, Duchess of Gloucester.

According to Martin Wiggins of the Shakespeare Institute, Buckingham may be the eponymous character of the early-17th-century play, Duke Humphrey, which is now lost. However, the lost play could instead have been about the equally eventful career of Prince Humphrey, Duke of Gloucester (1390–1447), the youngest son of Henry IV of England.

== Bibliography ==
- AALT (2020). "CP 40/740". Anglo-American Legal Tradition. University of Houston.
- Allmand, C. T. (1983). Lancastrian Normandy, 1415–1450: The History of Medieval Occupation. Oxford: Clarendon Press. ISBN 978-0-1982-2642-0. OL 3162148M.
- —— (2014). Henry V. New Haven, CT: Yale University Press. ISBN 978-0-3002-1293-8.
- Armstrong, C. A. J. (1960). "Politics and the Battle of St. Albans, 1455". Bulletin of the Institute of Historical Research. 33 (87): 1–72. doi:10.1111/j.1468-2281.1960.tb02226.x. OCLC 1001092266.
- Baugh, A. C. (1933). "Documenting Sir Thomas Malory". Speculum. 8: 3–29. doi:10.2307/2846845. JSTOR 2846845. OCLC 504113521.
- Bean, J. M. W. (1989). From Lord to Patron: Lordship in Late Medieval England. Manchester: Manchester University Press. ISBN 978-0-7190-2855-7.
- Beltz, G. F. (1841). Memorials of the Order of the Garter, from Its Foundation to the Present Time. London: W. Pickering. OCLC 4706731.
- Bernard, G. W. (1992). The Tudor Nobility. Manchester: Manchester University Press. ISBN 978-0-7190-3625-5.
- Biancalana, J. (2001). The Fee Tail and the Common Recovery in Medieval England: 1176–1502. Cambridge: Cambridge University Press. ISBN 978-1-1394-3082-1.
- British Library (2019). "Combat with Sir Pandolf Malateste, The Pageants of Richard Beauchamp". British Library.
- Britnell, R. H. (1995). "The Economic Context". In Pollard, A. J. (ed.). The Wars of the Roses. London: St. Martin's Press. pp. 41–64. ISBN 978-0-3121-2699-5.
- Carpenter, C. (1997). The Wars of the Roses: Politics and the Constitution in England, c.1437–1509. Cambridge: Cambridge University Press. ISBN 978-0-5213-1874-7.
- Carpenter, Christine (3 January 2008). "Beauchamp, Henry, duke of Warwick (1425–1446), magnate". Oxford Dictionary of National Biography. Oxford University Press. doi:10.1093/ref:odnb/1836.
- Castor, H. (2000). The King, the Crown, and the Duchy of Lancaster: Public Authority and Private Power, 1399–1461. Oxford: Oxford University Press. ISBN 978-0-1915-4248-0.
- Charlton, K. (2002). Women, Religion and Education in Early Modern England. London: Routledge. ISBN 978-1-1346-7659-0.
- Cherry, M. (1981). The Crown and the Political Community in Devon, 1377-1461 (PhD thesis). University of Wales (Swansea). OCLC 53569981.
- Cokayne, G. E. (1912). The Complete Peerage of England, Scotland, Ireland, Great Britain and the United Kingdom: Extant, Extinct, or Dormant. Vol. 2. London: St Catherine Press. OCLC 926878974.
- —— (1913). The Complete Peerage of England, Scotland, Ireland, Great Britain and the United Kingdom: Extant, Extinct, or Dormant. Vol. 3. London: St Catherine Press. OCLC 312790481.
- —— (1959). The Complete Peerage of England, Scotland, Ireland, Great Britain and the United Kingdom: Extant, Extinct, or Dormant. Vol. 12. London: St Catherine Press. OCLC 312826326.
- Crouch, D.; Carpenter, D. A. (1991). "Bastard feudalism Revised". Past & Present. 131: 165–189. doi:10.1093/past/131.1.165. OCLC 664602455.
- Curry, A. (2003). The Hundred Years War. London: Palgrave Macmillan. ISBN 978-0-2306-2969-1.
- Davies, C. S. L. (22 September 2011). "Stafford, Henry, second duke of Buckingham (1455–1483), magnate and rebel". Oxford Dictionary of National Biography. Oxford University Press. doi:10.1093/ref:odnb/26204.
- Dobson, M.; Wells, S.; Sullivan, E. (2015). The Oxford Companion to Shakespeare. Oxford: Oxford University Press. ISBN 978-0-1987-0873-5.
- Dunham, I. W. (1907). Dunham Genealogy: English and American Branches of the Dunham Family. Norwich, CT: Bulletin Print. OCLC 10378604.
- Emery, A. (2000). Greater Medieval Houses of England and Wales, 1300–1500: East Anglia, Central England and Wales. Vol. 2. Cambridge: Cambridge University Press. ISBN 0-5215-8131-1.
- Gertsman, E.; Stevenson, J. (2012). Thresholds of Medieval Visual Culture: Liminal Spaces. Woodbridge: Boydell Press. ISBN 978-1-8438-3697-1.
- Gillingham, J. (2001). The Wars of the Roses: Peace and Conflict in 15th Century England. London: Phoenix Press. ISBN 978-1-8421-2274-7.
- Goodman, A. (1990). The Wars of the Roses: Military Activity and English Society, 1452–1497. Oxford: Taylor & Francis. ISBN 978-0-4150-5264-1.
- Greyfriars Research Team; Kennedy, M.; Foxhall, L. (2015). The Bones of a King: Richard III. Oxford: Wiley-Blackwell. ISBN 978-1-1187-8314-6.
- Griffiths, R. A. (1979). "The Sense of Dynasty in the Reign of Henry VI". In Ross, C. D. (ed.). Patronage, Pedigree, and Power in Later Medieval England. Stroud: Alan Sutton. pp. 13–31. ISBN 978-0-8476-6205-0.
- —— (1981). The Reign of King Henry VI: The Exercise of Royal Authority, 1422–1461. Berkeley, CA: University of California Press. ISBN 978-0-5200-4372-5.
- Grummitt, D. (2008). The Calais Garrison: War and Military Service in England, 1436–1558. Woodbridge: Boydell & Brewer. ISBN 978-1-8438-3398-7.
- —— (2014). A Short History of the Wars of the Roses. London: I. B. Tauris. ISBN 978-0-8577-3303-0.
- —— (2015). Henry VI. London: Routledge. ISBN 978-1-3174-8260-4.
- Gundy, A. K. (2002). "The Earl of Warwick and the Royal Affinity in the Politics of the West Midlands, 1389-99". In Hicks, M. A. (ed.). Revolution and Consumption in Later Medieval England. Woodbridge: Boydell and Brewer. pp. 57–70. ISBN 978-0-8511-5832-7.
- Harding, V. (2002). The Dead and the Living in Paris and London, 1500–1670. Cambridge: Cambridge University Press. ISBN 978-0-5218-1126-2.
- Harris, B. J. (1986). Edward Stafford, Third Duke of Buckingham, 1478–1521. Stanford, CA: Stanford University Press. ISBN 978-0-8047-1316-0.
- —— (2002). English Aristocratic Women, 1450–1550: Marriage and Family, Property and Careers. Oxford: Oxford University Press. ISBN 978-0-1951-5128-2.
- Harris, P. (2006). Income Tax in Common Law Jurisdictions: From the Origins to 1820. Vol. I. Cambridge: Cambridge University Press. ISBN 978-0-5114-9548-9.
- Harriss, G. L. (1988). Cardinal Beaufort: A Study of Lancastrian Ascendancy and Decline. Oxford: Clarendon Press. ISBN 978-0-1982-0135-9. OL 7397428M.
- —— (3 January 2008). "Beaufort, Henry [called the Cardinal of England] (1375?–1447), bishop of Winchester and cardinal". Oxford Dictionary of National Biography. Oxford University Press. doi:10.1093/ref:odnb/1859.
- —— (19 May 2011). "Beaufort, John, marquess of Dorset and marquess of Somerset (c. 1371–1410), soldier and administrator". Oxford Dictionary of National Biography. Oxford University Press. doi:10.1093/ref:odnb/1861.
- —— (2006). Shaping the Nation: England 1360–1461. Oxford: Oxford University Press. ISBN 978-0-1992-1119-7.
- —— (2002). Warwick the Kingmaker. Oxford: Blackwell. ISBN 978-0-4707-5193-0.
- —— (2013). Bastard Feudalism. London: Routledge. ISBN 978-1-3178-9896-2.
- —— (2014). The Wars of the Roses: 1455–1485. London: Bloomsbury Publishing. ISBN 978-1-4728-1018-2.
- Jacob, E. F. (1993). The Fifteenth Century, 1399–1485. Oxford: Oxford University Press. ISBN 978-0-1928-5286-1.
- Johnson, P. A. (1991). Duke Richard of York 1411–1460. Oxford: Clarendon Press. ISBN 978-0-1982-0268-4.
- Jones, M. K. (1983). The Beaufort Family and the War in France 1421–1450 (Doctoral thesis thesis). University of Bristol.
- Kenny, G. (2003). "The Power of Dower: The Importance of Dower in the Lives of Medieval Women in Ireland". In Meek, C.; Lawless, C. (eds.). Studies on Medieval and Early Modern Women: Pawns Or Players?. Dublin: Four Courts. pp. 59–74. ISBN 978-1-8518-2775-6.
- Kleinschmidt, H. (2000). Understanding the Middle Ages: The Transformation of Ideas and Attitudes in the Medieval World. Woodbridge: Boydell & Brewer. ISBN 978-0-8511-5770-2.
- Lander, J. R. (1981). Government and Community: England, 1450–1509. New Haven, CT: Harvard University Press. ISBN 978-0-6743-5794-5.
- Lawler, J. J.; Lawler, G. G. (2000) [1940]. A Short Historical Introduction to the Law of Real Property (repr. ed.). Washington, DC: Beard Books. ISBN 978-1-5879-8032-9.
- Lenarduzzi, T. (5 March 2016). "What do the scholars of the Shakespeare Institute actually do?". The Independent. OCLC 183290378.
- Lewis, M. (2015). The Wars of the Roses: The Key Players in the Struggle for Supremacy. Gloucester: Amberley. ISBN 978-1-4456-4636-7.
- de Lisle, L. (2014). Tudor: The Family Story. London: Vintage. ISBN 978-0-0995-5528-5.
- Logan, H. M. (1979). "KLIC: A Computer Aid to Graphological Analysis". In Gilmour-Bryson A. (ed.). Medieval Studies and the Computer: Computers and The Humanities. New York: Elsevier Science. pp. 93–96. ISBN 978-1-4831-3636-3.
- Lustig, T. J. (2014). Knight Prisoner: Thomas Malory Then and Now. Brighton: Sussex Academic Press. ISBN 978-1-7828-4118-0.
- Matusiak, J. (2012). Henry V. London: Routledge. ISBN 978-1-1361-6251-0.
- McFarlane, K. B. (1980). The Nobility of Later Medieval England: The Ford Lectures for 1953 and Related Studies. Oxford: Clarendon Press. ISBN 978-0-1982-2657-4.
- —— (1981). England in the Fifteenth Century: Collected Essays. London: Bloomsbury Publishing. ISBN 978-0-8264-4191-1.
- Morris, E. (1955). Towers and Bells of Britain. London: Hale. OCLC 638259943.
- Nicolas, N. H. (1826). Testamenta Vetusta. Vol. I. London: Nichols & son. OCLC 78175058.
- Pollard, A. J. (1995). The Wars of the Roses. London: St. Martin's Press. ISBN 978-0-3121-2699-5.
- Pugh, T. B. (1972). "The Magnates, Knights and Gentry". In Chrimes, S. B.; Ross, C. D.; Griffiths, R. A. (eds.). Fifteenth-century England, 1399–1509: Studies in Politics and Society. Manchester: Manchester University Press. pp. 86–128. ISBN 978-0-0649-1126-9.
- Rawcliffe, Carole (1978). The Staffords, Earls of Stafford and Dukes of Buckingham: 1394–1521. Cambridge: Cambridge University Press. ISBN 978-0-5212-1663-0.
- —— (3 January 2008). "Stafford, Humphrey, first duke of Buckingham (1402–1460), soldier and magnate". Oxford Dictionary of National Biography. Oxford University Press. doi:10.1093/ref:odnb/26207.
- Reeves, A. C. (1972). "Some of Humphrey Stafford's Military Indentures". Nottingham Medieval Studies. 16: 80–91. doi:10.1484/J.NMS.3.58. OCLC 941877294.
- Ross, C. D. (1952). The Yorkshire Baronage, 1399–1436 (D.phil thesis). University of Oxford.
- —— (1972). "The reign of Edward IV". In Chrimes, S. B.; Ross, C. D.; Griffiths, R. A. (eds.). Fifteenth-century England, 1399–1509: Studies in Politics and Society. Manchester: Manchester University Press. pp. 49–66. ISBN 978-0-0649-1126-9.
- —— (1986). The Wars of the Roses: A Concise History. London: Thames and Hudson. ISBN 978-0-5002-7407-1.
- Storey, R. L. (1999). The End of the House of Lancaster. Gloucester: Sutton. ISBN 978-0-7509-2007-0.
- St John Hope, William (1914). Pageant of the birth, life and death of Richard Beauchamp, Earl of Warwick, K.G., 1389-1439. London: Longmans Green. OCLC 2601632.
- Stansfield, M. M. N. (1987). The Holland family, Dukes of Exeter, Earls of Kent and Huntingdon, 1352–1475 (D.Phil thesis). University of Oxford.
- —— (4 October 2008). "Holland, Edmund, seventh earl of Kent (1383–1408), magnate". Oxford Dictionary of National Biography. Oxford University Press. doi:10.1093/ref:odnb/13518.
- Tait, J. (1898). "Stafford, Humphrey, First Duke of Buckingham (1402–1460)". In Lee, S. (ed.). Dictionary of National Biography. Vol. 53. London: Smith, Elder & co. pp. 451–454. OCLC 1070754020.
- Thomas, H. M. (1997). "An Upwardly Mobile Medieval Woman: Juliana of Warwick". Medieval Prosopography. 18: 109122. OCLC 956033208.
- VCH (1907). The Victoria History of the County of Essex. Vol. II. London: Archibald Constable. OCLC 926363375.
- Walker, S. (1976). "Widow and Ward: The Feudal Law of Child Custody in Medieval England". Feminist Studies. 3 (3/4): 107–118. doi:10.2307/3177730. hdl:2027/spo.0499697.0003.310. JSTOR 3177730. OCLC 972063595.
- Wiggins, M. (2015). British Drama 1533–1642: A Catalogue, 1609–1616. Vol. VI. Oxford: Oxford University Press. ISBN 978-0-1987-3911-1.
- Wolffe, B. P. (1971). The Royal Demesne in English History: The Crown Estate in the Governance of the Realm from the Conquest to 1509. Athens, OH: Ohio University Press. OCLC 277321.
- Woolgar, C. M. (1999). The Great Household in Late Medieval England. New Haven, CT: Yale University Press. ISBN 978-0-3000-7687-5.
- Zimbalist, B. (2012). "Imitating the Imagined: Clemence of Barking's Life of St. Catherine". In Cotter-Lynch, M.; Herzog, B. (eds.). Reading Memory and Identity in the Texts of Medieval European Holy Women. New York: Palgrave Macmillan. pp. 105–134. ISBN 978-1-1370-6483-7.

Political offices
Preceded by	Lieutenant-General of Normandy; 1430–1432	Succeeded by
Preceded by	Constable of France and Governor of Paris; 1432-1436	Succeeded by
Preceded by Sir Thomas Kyriell	Captain of Calais; 1441–1451	Succeeded by Edmund Beaufort, 2nd Duke of Somerset
Preceded by	English Ambassador to France; 1446	Succeeded by
Preceded by James Fiennes, 1st Baron Saye and Sele	Lord Warden of the Cinque Ports; 1450–1459	Succeeded by Richard Woodville, 1st Earl Rivers
Preceded by Edmund Beaufort, 2nd Duke of Somerset	Lord High Constable; 1455	Succeeded by Richard of York, 3rd Duke of York
Preceded by Richard of York, 3rd Duke of York	Lord High Constable; 1456–1460	Succeeded by John Tiptoft, 1st Earl of Worcester
Peerage of England
New creation	Duke of Buckingham; 1444–1460	Succeeded by Henry Stafford, 2nd Duke of Buckingham
Preceded by Edmund Stafford, 5th Earl of Stafford	Earl of Stafford; 1403–1460	Succeeded by Henry Stafford, 2nd Duke of Buckingham
