= Thomas Barber (Stafford MP) =

English politician (died 1439)

Thomas Barber (died 1439) was an English politician. He sat as MP for Stafford in 1402, 1411 and May 1413.

== Political career ==
He also served as bailiff of Stafford from 1 November 1411 till 1412, 1428 till 1429, 1431 till 1432, probably 1433 till 1434 and 1435 till 1436; coroner of Staffordshire from May 1413 till after Hilary term 1416; alnager of Staffordshire from Michaelmas 1413 till 1418; receiver-general of the estates of Humphrey, Earl Stafford by 8 May 1425 till Michaelmas 1434; receiver of the Earl's estates in Staffordshire from Michaelmas 1434 till before 4 June 1439; and escheator of Shropshire and the adjacent Welsh march from 5 November 1433 till 3 November 1434.

== Family ==
He married Joan and had at least two sons including William Barber.
