= Château de Pontoise =

Ruined castle in Val-d'Oise, France

Coordinates: 49°02′54″N 2°06′00″E

The Château de Pontoise was an ancient castle located in Pontoise, in the Val-d'Oise department of the Île-de-France region of France. Only fragmentary ruins remain.

== History ==
A castle was built in the 10th century by the counts of Vexin. During the Hundred Years' War with England, the castle was strengthened. The English garrisoned town and castle was besieged on 8 June 1441 by an army led by King Charles I and a force of heavy artillery led by Jean Bureau. The garrison, led by Sir John Clinton fought the French in fierce fighting in the town and the English were either captured or killed.

King Louis XIV took refuge in the castle during the Fronde. The castle was destroyed by Louis XV, due to unsanitary conditions.
