= Siege of Pontoise =

Battle of the Hundred Years War

- Part of the Hundred Years' War
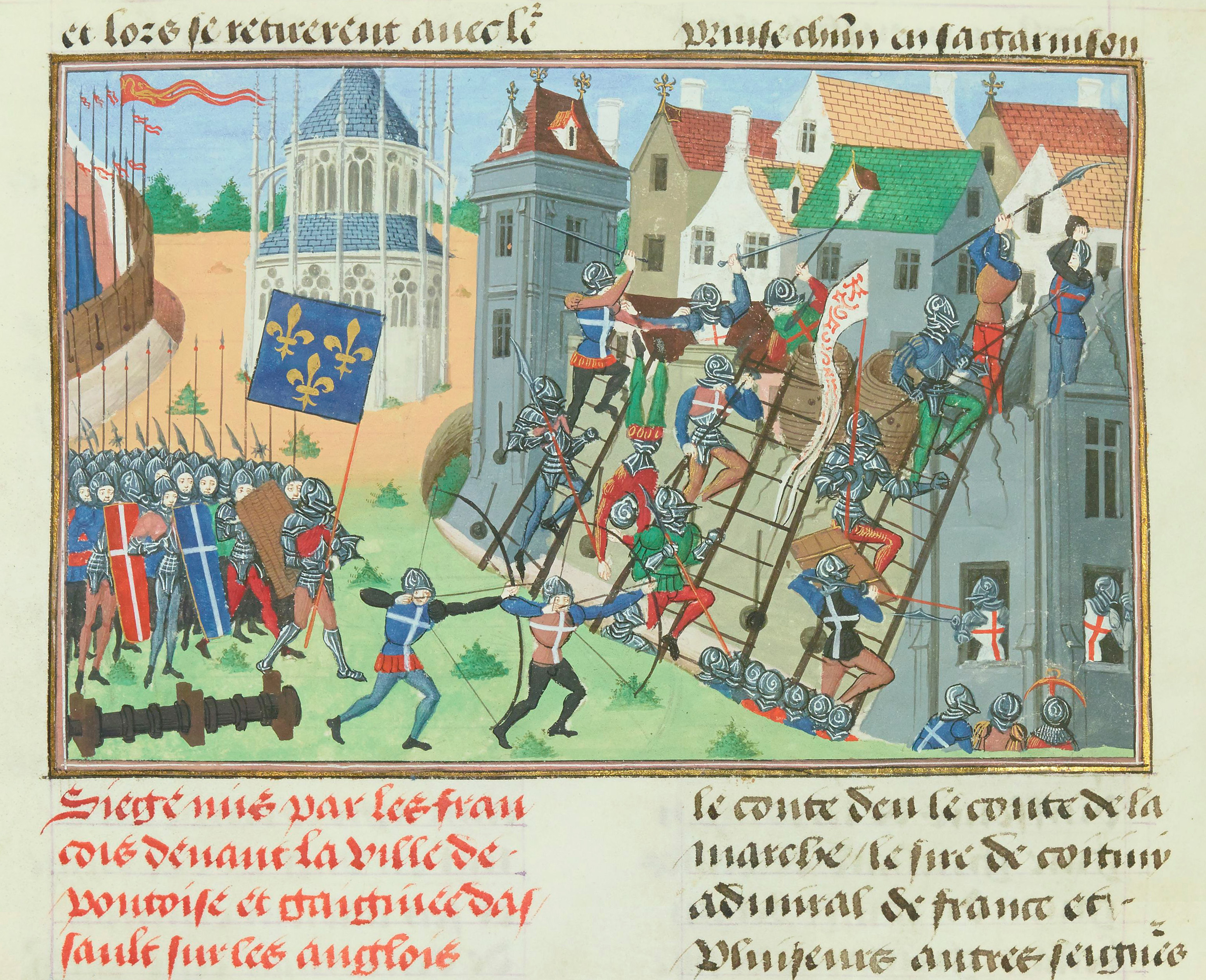
- Illumination adorning La Cronicque du temps de Tres Chrestien Roy Charles, septisme de ce nom, roy de France by Jean Chartier, c. 1470–1479
Date	6 June – 19 September 1441 (3 months, 1 week and 6 days)
Location	Pontoise, Île de France, France 49.0516°N 02.1017°E
Result	French victory

Belligerents
France	England

Commanders and leaders
Charles VII of France; Arthur de Richemont	Garrison: John, Lord Clinton (POW); Relief armies: Richard, Duke of York; John Talbot

Strength
5,000	Garrison: 1,000–1,200; Relief army: 3,600

Casualties and losses
	400–500 killed Hundreds captured Unransomed captives killed

The siege of Pontoise (6 June – 19 September 1441) took place during the Hundred Years War. French forces led by King Charles VII of France besieged and captured the last English stronghold in Île de France, eliminating the English threat to Paris.

== Prelude ==
For the campaign of 1441, King Charles VII of France assembled an army of 5,000 men led by himself and Constable Arthur de Richemont and accompanied by a powerful train of heavy artillery led by Jean Bureau. The town and castle of Creil was besieged on 8 May. The walls were breached by the French guns and the English garrison of William Peyto surrendered on 25 May.

== Siege ==
Pontoise was next on the king's list and it and its garrison of 1,000–1,200 was besieged on 6 June. The French garrison at Louviers had been building a fort on the Seine to reduce the traffic of supplies from Rouen to Pontoise, while the English commander John Talbot had sent supplies and guns to Pontoise from the middle of May onward. Charles made Maubuisson Abbey his headquarters. Prigent VII de Coëtivy created a pontoon bridge across the Oise river and captured the Abbey of Saint-Martin outside the town walls. Bureau's guns pounded the barbican at the end of the town bridge for 15 days and the position was subsequently taken by the French. The artillery then switched location and began bombing the town.

From 16 June to 5 September, Talbot interrupted the siege five times with a relief army by sending in troops and provisions through the town's upriver gate. Charles ordered the Constable not to fight Talbot. The arrival of another relief army of 900 men-at-arms and 2,700 archers under Richard, Duke of York in mid-July and a diversionary attack by Talbot did not draw the French away from their fortified positions. York skirmished with the French, who broke off the siege. York crossed and recrossed the Oise repeatedly and tried to prevent the flow of supplies from Paris to the siege army but was himself short of supplies and withdrew to Normandy in mid-August.

After York's retreat, Charles resumed the siege and bombardment by 16 August. On 16 September, a force under the sires de Lohéac and de Bueil stormed through a breach in the wall and captured the church of Notre Dame, killing 24 out of 30 English defenders. An all-out attack on 19 September resulted in the complete destruction of the English garrison with 400–500 killed and hundreds captured, including the garrison's commander Lord Clinton, in return for minimal French casualties.

== Aftermath ==
In accordance with the laws of war, Pontoise's capture by assault rather than capitulation placed the population at Charles' mercy and led to the seizure of all their property. Clinton and most of his officers were ransomed. Those who were not ransomed were drowned in public. The last English stronghold in Île de France had been conquered.
