= Baron Clinton =

Hereditary title in the Peerage of England

Barony of Clinton
- Argent semée of cross crosslets fitchy sable, in a chief azure two mullets or pierced gules (Clinton), charged with an inescutcheon quarterly; 1st, Argent, on a fess azure three dexter gauntlets appaumée or (Fane); 2nd, Argent, a chevron between three spindles sable (Trefusis); 3rd, azure, three bear's heads couped argent, muzzled gules, a cross crosslet argent for distinction (Forbes of Pitsligo); 4th, Or, a bend gules surmounted by a fess chequy azure and argent, in chief crescent azure a canton ermine for difference (Stuart)
- Creation date: 6 February 1298
- Creation: First
- Created by: Edward I
- Peerage: Peerage of England
- First holder: Sir John de Clinton
- Heir apparent: The Hon. Charles Fane-Trefusis
- Remainder to: Heirs general
- Status: Extant
- Seat: Heanton Satchville, Huish
- Former seats: Bicton House; Maxstoke Castle; Castle Hill, Filleigh; Heanton Satchville, Petrockstowe
- Motto: Tout vient de Dieu ("Everything comes from God")

Arms of de Clinton, Barons Clinton: Argent, six crosses crosslet fitchée sable three two and one on a chief azure two mullets or pierced gules

Baron Clinton is a title in the Peerage of England. Created in 1298 for Sir John de Clinton, it is the seventh-oldest barony in England.

== Creation and early history ==
The title was granted in 1298 to Sir John de Clinton, a knight who had served in the Scottish and French wars. The peerage was created by writ, which means that it can descend through both male and female lines. It is thus one of the most ancient English titles still in existence.

William, the younger son of the first Baron, was also summoned to parliament by writ on 6 September 1330 as Baron de Clynton, even though his elder brother, the second Baron, was sitting in parliament under the same title. He was created Earl of Huntingdon in 1337.

The second Baron, John, fought with the king's army, which defeated Edward II's cousin Thomas, Earl of Lancaster, at the Battle of Boroughbridge in 1321. He was knighted by 1324. The third Baron fought at the Battle of Poitiers in the Hundred Years' War and was the Constable of Warwick Castle (1390–1397). He married at least three times. His first wife, Idonea de Saye, was the daughter of Geoffrey de Saye, 2nd Lord Saye. He was succeeded in the barony by their grandson, son of their son Sir William Clinton (DVP 25 October 1383).

In 1399, upon the death of the fourth Baron's cousin, Elizabeth de Saye de Falvesley Heron, Baroness Saye, the fourth Baron succeeded to the Saye lands and styled himself Lord Saye. He married three times; firstly, to Anne Trivett, daughter of Sir Thomas Trivett; secondly, to Alice or Anne FitzWarin, daughter of the 2nd Baron Botreaux and the widow of the 6th Lord Fitzwarin; and thirdly to Mary Retford, widow of Sir Henry Retford.

He was succeeded by his son from his second marriage. The fifth Baron fought on the Yorkist side in the Wars of the Roses. He was attainted in 1461 but later restored to his title. The sixth Baron was recognised in 1471 as Lord Clinton and Saye, but was not called to Parliament under either title. He married Elisabeth, daughter of Sir Richard Fiennes, and took Fiennes as an alias, and Clinton and Saye baronies continued to be linked for several generations. The 10th and 11th Barons were called to Parliament as Baron Clinton de Saye.

Edward Clinton, 9th Baron Clinton, was created Earl of Lincoln in 1572. The titles remained united until 1692 upon the death of his great-great-great-grandson, Edward de Clinton, fifth Earl of Lincoln and 13th Baron Clinton. The earldom was inherited by the late Earl's cousin, the sixth Earl (see the Earl of Lincoln for later history of this title) while the barony fell into abeyance between the issue of his two aunts, Lady Margaret Clinton (d. 1688) and Lady Arabella Clinton, the daughters of Theophilus de Clinton, 4th Earl of Lincoln and 12th Baron Clinton.

== Barony into first abeyance ==
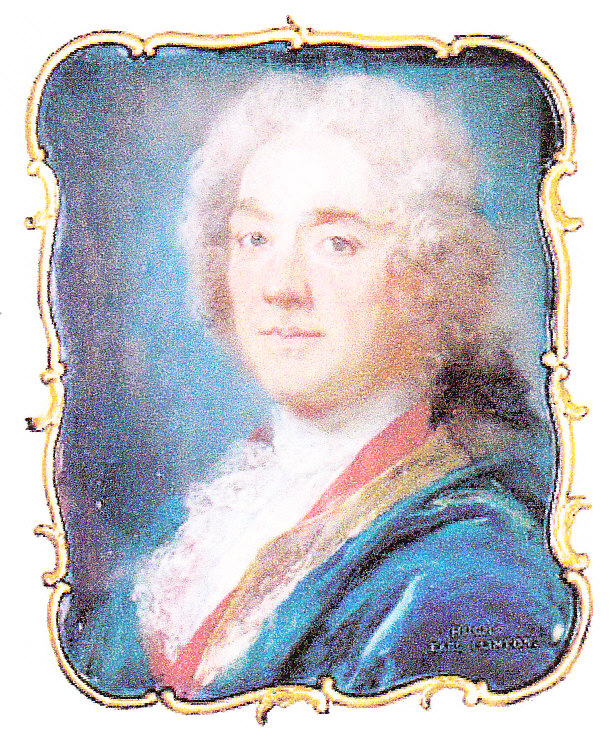
Hugh Fortescue, Earl Clinton (d. 1751). Collection of Countess of Arran, Castle Hill

Arms of Fortescue: Azure, a bend engrailled argent plain cottised or. Motto: Forte Scutum Salus Ducum ("A Strong Shield is the Salvation of Leaders")

The abeyance of 1692 was terminated in 1721 in favour of Hugh Fortescue (d. 1751), fourteenth Baron Clinton, the grandson of Lady Margaret Clinton (d. 1688), the eldest daughter of Theophilus de Clinton, 4th Earl of Lincoln and 12th Baron Clinton (d. 1667). Lady Margaret had married Hugh Boscawen (1625–1701), MP, of Tregothnan in Cornwall, and their daughter Bridget Boscawen (d. 1708) married Hugh Fortescue (1665–1719) (son of Arthur Fortescue by Barbara Elford) and had issue Sir Hugh Fortescue (d. 1751). In 1746, he was created Baron Fortescue, of Castle Hill in the County of Devon (with remainder to his half-brother Matthew Fortescue) and Earl Clinton, with remainder to the heirs male of his body. The Earl was childless and on his death the earldom of Clinton became extinct but his two baronies continued. He was succeeded in the barony of Fortescue (according to the special remainder) by his half-brother, the second Baron Fortescue (see Earl Fortescue for later history of this title). The barony of Clinton was inherited by his second cousin Margaret Rolle, 15th Baroness Clinton, the granddaughter of Lady Arabella Clinton, the younger daughter of Theophilus de Clinton, 4th Earl of Lincoln and 12th Baron Clinton (d. 1667). Margaret Rolle was the widow of Robert Walpole, 2nd Earl of Orford (d. 1751) and the daughter of Samuel Rolle, the son of Robert Rolle (d. 1660), MP, of Heanton Satchville, Devon, by his wife Lady Arabella Clinton. She was succeeded by her son, George Walpole, third Earl of Orford and 16th Baron Clinton (d. 1791). He was childless and on his death in 1791 the earldom passed to his uncle, the fourth Earl of Orford (see the Earl of Orford for later history of this title), while the barony of Clinton became dormant.

== Barony dormant ==
The barony, which had been dormant since 1791, was successfully claimed in 1794 by the late Earl of Orford's cousin Robert George William Trefusis (1764–1797), who became the 17th Baron Clinton. He was the three-times great-grandson of Lady Arabella Clinton, the younger daughter of the fourth Earl of Lincoln. Lady Arabella's daughter Bridget Rolle had married Francis Trefusis of Trefusis in Cornwall, and had issue Samuel Trefusis (1677–1724), whose great-grandson was the 17th Baron Clinton.

The 18th Baron served as aide-de-camp to the Duke of Wellington during the Peninsular War. He was succeeded by his younger brother, who represented Callington in the House of Commons, in which role he was notable. He was succeeded by his son, the 20th Baron Clinton (1834–1904). He served as Under-Secretary of State for India from 1867 to 1868 in the Conservative administrations of the Earl of Derby and Benjamin Disraeli and was also Lord Lieutenant of Devonshire. In 1867 Baron Clinton assumed by Royal licence the additional surnames of Hepburn-Stuart-Forbes, which were those of his father-in-law. His son, the 21st Baron, held minor office in the coalition government of David Lloyd George and served as Lord Warden of the Stannaries.

== Barony into second abeyance ==
Following the death of the 21st Baron Clinton on 5 July 1957, the barony fell into abeyance between his two daughters: The Hon. Harriet Fane (14 November 1887 – 15 March 1958), who married Maj. Henry Nevile Fane, only son of Sir Edmund Fane (whom she divorced in 1935); and the Hon. Fenella Bowes-Lyon (19 August 1889 – 19 July 1966), an aunt of Queen Elizabeth II through her marriage to John Bowes-Lyon, second son of the 14th Earl of Strathmore and Kinghorne. The abeyance of 1957 was terminated 18 March 1965 in favour of Gerald Neville Mark Fane Trefusis, the 22nd Lord Clinton, who was the great-grandson of the 21st Baron Clinton and grandson of Hon. Harriet Fane. His great-aunt Fenella supported his eight-year legal fight to succeed as baron. He had already in 1958 assumed by deed poll the additional surname of Trefusis and had inherited the 85,000-acre estate in Devon from his great-grandfather.

== Residences ==
The family seat is Heanton Satchville, Huish, near Merton in North Devon, which was built in 1782 as "Innis House" by James Innis, Duke of Roxburgh, and was purchased by the 18th Baron Clinton in about 1805, renamed Heanton Satchville, which burned down in 1935 and was rebuilt.

After the death of Hon. Mark Rolle in 1907, Bicton House became the main residence of the 21st Baron Clinton until his death in 1957, where much grand entertaining occurred until the start of World War II and where a herd of 150 deer were kept in the park. The Duke and Duchess of York spent part of their honeymoon there.

The 1st Baron resided at Maxstoke Castle, Warwickshire, the inheritance of his wife. The 5th Baron exchanged it for lands in Northamptonshire. The 9th Baron's chief seat was in Lincolnshire on an estate which was the inheritance of his wife Elizabeth Blount. The seat of the 14th Baron Clinton was Castle Hill, Filleigh, rebuilt by him in the Palladian style. The seat of the 15th Baroness was Heanton Satchville, Petrockstowe, the ancient Rolle seat, although she spent the later part of her life on the Continent, having left her first husband, and died in Pisa. Her son the 16th Baron largely abandoned that residence in favour of Houghton Hall in Norfolk. Although he had the legal power to do so, he did not end the tail-male of the Rolle estates, and the estates thus passed to the Trefusis family not to his own heirs male the Lords Cholmondely, heirs to the Walpole estates, who unsuccessfully claimed the Rolle estates from the 18th Baron Clinton in a lengthy court case. Heanton Satchville, Petrockstowe became the seat of the 17th Baron only for a short time as it burnt down in 1795 and he died two years later. His son the 18th Baron when he came of age purchased Innes House on the other side of a marshy valley in the parish of Huish and renamed it Heanton Satchville.

== Barons Clinton (1298) ==
- John Clinton, 1st Baron Clinton (died 1315)
- John Clinton, 2nd Baron Clinton (died c. 1335)
- John Clinton, 3rd Baron Clinton (died 1398)
- William Clinton, 4th Baron Clinton (1378–1431), married Alice, daughter of William de Botreaux, 2nd Baron Botreaux
- John Clinton, 5th Baron Clinton (1410–1464)
- John Clinton, 6th Baron Clinton (1431–1488)
- John Clinton, 7th Baron Clinton (1471–1514)
- Thomas Clinton, 8th Baron Clinton (1490–1517)
- Edward Clinton, 9th Baron Clinton (1512–1585) (created Earl of Lincoln in 1572)

== Earls of Lincoln (1572) ==
- Edward Clinton, 1st Earl of Lincoln, 9th Baron Clinton (1512–1585)
- Henry Clinton, 2nd Earl of Lincoln, 10th Baron Clinton (1541–1616)
- Thomas Clinton, 3rd Earl of Lincoln, 11th Baron Clinton (1568–1619)
- Theophilus Clinton, 4th Earl of Lincoln, 12th Baron Clinton (1600–1667)
- Edward Clinton, 5th Earl of Lincoln, 13th Baron Clinton (died 1692) (abeyant)

== Barons Clinton (1298; reverted) ==
- Hugh Fortescue, 14th Baron Clinton (1696–1751) (abeyance terminated 1721; created Baron Fortescue and Earl Clinton in 1749)

== Barons Fortescue and Earls Clinton (1749) ==
- Hugh Fortescue, 1st Earl Clinton, 14th Baron Clinton (1696–1751) (abeyant 1751)

== Barons Clinton (1298; reverted) ==
- Margaret Rolle, 15th Baroness Clinton (1709–1781) (abeyance terminated 1760)
- George Walpole, 3rd Earl of Orford, 16th Baron Clinton (1730–1791) (son by mother's 1st marriage) (dormant on his death)
- Robert George William Trefusis, 17th Baron Clinton (1764–1797) (cousin) (claimed title 1794)
- Robert Cotton St John Trefusis, 18th Baron Clinton (1787–1832) (son)
- Charles Rodolph Trefusis, 19th Baron Clinton (1791–1866) (brother)
- Charles Henry Rolle Hepburn-Stuart-Forbes-Trefusis, 20th Baron Clinton (1834–1904) (son)
- Charles John Robert Hepburn-Stuart-Forbes-Trefusis, 21st Baron Clinton (1863–1957) (son) (abeyant)
- Gerard Neville Mark Fane-Trefusis, 22nd Baron Clinton (1934–2024) (born Gerard Fane, eldest daughter's grandson) (abeyance terminated 1965)
- Charles Patrick Rolle Fane-Trefusis, 23rd Baron Clinton (born 1962)

The heir apparent is the present holder's son Edward Charles Rolle Fane-Trefusis (born 1994).

== Family tree ==
Family Tree of the Dukes of Newcastle, Earls of Lincoln (8th creation) and Earls of Clare

Baron Clinton (8th creation), 1298
John Clinton d. 1315; 1st Baron Clinton
Baron de Clynton, cr. 1330
John Clinton d. c. 1335; 2nd Baron Clinton	William de Clinton c. 1304 – 1354; Earl of Huntingdon, Baron de Clynton
Barony de Clynton extinct, 1354
John Clinton d. 1398; 3rd Baron Clinton
William Clinton dvp. 1383
William Clinton; 1378–1431; 4th Baron Clinton
Baron Ogle, 1461
John Clinton; 1410–1464; 5th Baron Clinton; Attainted, 1459; restored, 1461	Robert Ogle; 1406–1469; 1st Baron Ogle
John Clinton c. 1429 – 1488; 6th Baron Clinton	Owen (Ewyn) Ogle; 1440–1486; 2nd Baron Ogle
John Clinton c. 1470 – 1514; 7th Baron Clinton	Ralph Ogle; 1468–1513; 3rd Baron Ogle
Thomas Clinton; 1490–1517; 8th Baron Clinton	Robert Ogle; 1490–1530; 4th Baron Ogle
Earl of Lincoln (8th creation), 1572
Edward Clinton; 1512–1585; 1st Earl of Lincoln, 9th Baron Clinton	Robert Ogle; 1513/1527 – 1545; 5th Baron Ogle
Henry Clinton; 1539–1616; 2nd Earl of Lincoln, 10th Baron Clinton	Robert Ogle; 1529–1562; 6th Baron Ogle	Cuthbert Ogle c. 1540 – 1597; 7th Baron Ogle	William Cavendish c. 1505 – 1557	Bess of Hardwick c. 1527 – 1608
Earldom of Ogle abeyant, 1597
Earl of Ogle abeyance ended, 1628
Thomas Clinton; 1568–1619; 3rd Earl of Lincoln, 11th Baron Clinton	Edward Clinton; 1572–1623	Catherine Ogle; 1568/69/1570–1629; 8th Baroness Ogle	Charles Cavendish; 1553–1617	Frances Cavendish; 1548–1632	Henry Pierrepont; 1546–1615	see Earls & Dukes of Devonshire
Viscount Mansfield, 1620; Earl of Newcastle upon Tyne, 1628; Marquess of Newcastle-upon-Tyne, 1643; Duke of Newcastle-Upon-Tyne (1st creation) and Earl of Ogle, 1665	Earl of Clare (1st creation, 1624)
Henry Clinton later Fynes; 1587–1641	William Cavendish; 1592–1676; 1st Duke (and Marquess and Earl) of Newcastle-upon-Tyne and Viscount Mansfield, 9th Baron Ogle	Robert Pierrepont; 1584–1643; 1st Earl of Kingston-upon-Hull	John Holles; 1564–1637; 1st Earl of Clare
Baron Holles of Ifield in the County of Sussex
Theophilus Clinton; 1600–1667; 4th Earl of Lincoln, 12th Baron Clinton	Francis Clinton; 1610–1681	William Pierrepont c. 1607 – 1678	John Holles; 1595–1666; 2nd Earl of Clare	Denzil Holles; 1599–1680; 1st Baron Holles
Baronet of Winterbourne in the County of Dorset, 1660
Edward Clinton; 1624–1657	Francis Clinton; 1635–1693; 6th Earl of Lincoln	Norreys Fynes; 1617–1693	Henry Cavendish; 1630–1691; 2nd Duke (and Marquess and Earl) of Newcastle-upon-Tyne and Viscount Mansfield, 9th Baron Ogle	Frances Pierrepont; 1630–1695	Grace Pierrepont; 1633–1702	Gilbert Holles; 1633–1689; 3rd Earl of Clare	Francis Holles; 1627–1690; 2nd Baron Holles, 1st Baronet
Barony Ogle abeyant and all other titles extinct, 1691
Duke of Newcastle-Upon-Tyne (2nd creation) and Marquess of Clare (1st creation), 1694	Baron Pelham of Laughton, 1706; Baron Pelham of Stanmer, 1762
Edward Clinton; 1645–1692; 5th Earl of Lincoln, 13th Baron Clinton	Norreys Fynes; 1651–1736	Margaret Cavendish; 1661–1716	John Holles; 1662–1711; Duke of Newcastle-upon-Tyne and Marquess of Clare, 4th Earl of Clare	Grace Holles c. 1668 – 1700	Thomas Pelham; 1653–1712; Baron Pelham of Laughton and of Stanmer, 4th Pelham baronet, of Laughton	Denzil Holles; 1675–c. 1692; 3rd Baron Holles, 1st Baronet
All titles extinct, 1711	Both titles extinct, c. 1692
Earl of Clare (2nd creation, 1714; Duke of Newcastle-Upon-Tyne (3rd creation) and Marquess of Clare (2nd creation), 1715; Duke of Newcastle-Under-Lyne, 1756
Kendal Fynes; 1692–1740	Henry Clinton; 1684–1728; 7th Earl of Lincoln	Lucy Pelham; 1695–1736	Henry Pelham; 1694–1754	Thomas Pelham-Holles; 1693–1768; Duke of Newcastle-upon-Tyne, 1st Duke of Newcastle-under-Lyne, Marquess of Clare, Earl of Clare
All titles except Dukedom of Newcastle-under-Lyne extinct, 1768
Duke of Newcastle-Under-Lyne, 1756 (succeeded by special remainder, 1768)
Norreys Fynes; 1720–1764	George Clinton; 1718–1730; 8th Earl of Lincoln	Henry Pelham-Clinton; 1720–1794; 2nd Duke of Newcastle-under-Lyne, 9th Earl of Lincoln	Catherine Pelham; 1727–1760
Baron FitzGibbon, of Lower Connello in the County of Limerick (Ire), 1789; Viscount of Clare (Ire), 1793; Earl of Clare (Ire 3rd creation), 1795; Baron FitzGibbon, of Sidbury in the County of Devon (GB), 1799
John FitzGibbon; 1748–1802; 1st Earl of Clare	The FitzGibbon Earls of Clare are seemingly unrelated to the Holles family, the previous Earls of Clare.	Charles Fynes later Fynes Clinton; 1748–1827	Henry Pelham-Clinton; 1750–1778; Earl of Lincoln	Thomas Pelham-Clinton; 1752–1795; 3rd Duke of Newcastle-under-Lyne, 10th Earl of Lincoln
John FitzGibbon; 1792–1851; 2nd Earl of Clare	Richard Hobart FitzGibbon; 1793–1864; 3rd Earl of Clare	Clinton James Fynes Clinton later Fiennes-Clinton; 1792–1833	Henry Pelham-Clinton; 1785–1851; 4th Duke of Newcastle-under-Lyne, 11th Earl of Lincoln
Earldom of Clare extinct, 1864
Henry Fiennes-Clinton; 1826–1911	Henry Pelham-Clinton; 1811–1864; 5th Duke of Newcastle-under-Lyne, 12th Earl of Lincoln	Charles Pelham-Clinton; 1813–1894
Charles Edward Fiennes-Clinton; 1855–1888	Henry Pelham-Clinton; 1834–1879; 6th Duke of Newcastle-under-Lyne, 13th Earl of Lincoln	Charles Pelham-Clinton; 1857–1911
Edward Henry Fiennes-Clinton; 1886–1916	Henry Pelham-Clinton; 1864–1928; 7th Duke of Newcastle-under-Lyne, 14th Earl of Lincoln	Francis Pelham-Clinton-Hope; 1866–1941; 8th Duke of Newcastle-under-Lyne, 15th Earl of Lincoln	Guy Pelham-Clinton; 1894–1934
Edward Horace Fiennes-Clinton; 1913–2001; 18th Earl of Lincoln	Henry Pelham-Clinton-Hope; 1907–1988; 9th Duke of Newcastle-under-Lyne, 16th Earl of Lincoln	Edward Pelham-Clinton; 1920–1988; 10th Duke of Newcastle-under-Lyne, 17th Earl of Lincoln
Dukedom of Newcastle-upon-Tyne extinct, 1988
Edward Gordon Fiennes-Clinton; 1943–1999
Robert Edward Fiennes-Clinton b. 1972; 19th Earl of Lincoln	William James (Fiennes-Clinton) Howson b. 1980
Heir presumptive to his elder brother in the earldom of Lincoln

== See also ==
- Earl of Lincoln (1572 creation)
- Duke of Newcastle-Under-Lyne (1756 creation)
- Earl Fortescue
- Earl of Orford
