= John Stafford, 1st Earl of Wiltshire =

English nobleman

John Stafford, Earl of Wiltshire KG KB
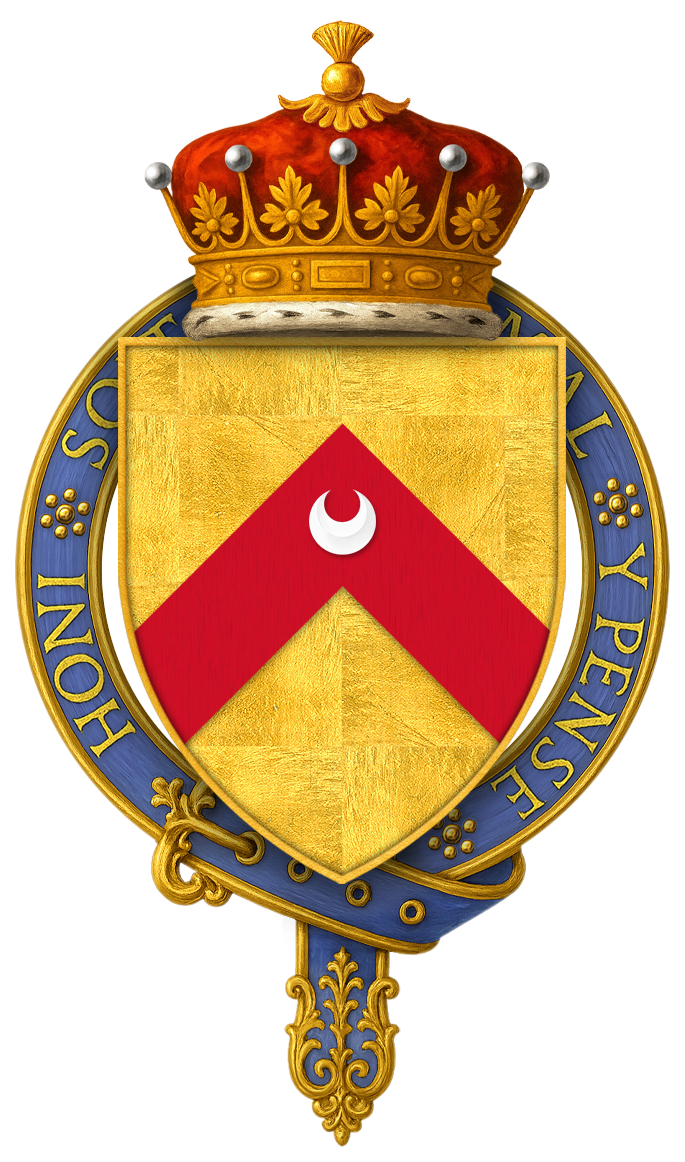
- Arms of Sir John Stafford, 1st Earl of Wiltshire, KG

Chief Butler of England
- In office 1471–1473
- Monarch: Edward IV
- Preceded by: John Wenlock, 1st Baron Wenlock
- Succeeded by: Anthony Woodville, 2nd Earl Rivers

Personal details
- Born: 24 November 1427
- Died: 8 May 1473 (aged 45)
- Spouse: Constance Green
- Relations: Stafford Family
- Children: Edward Stafford, 2nd Earl of Wiltshire
- Parents: Humphrey Stafford, 1st Duke of Buckingham; Lady Anne Neville

John Stafford, 1st Earl of Wiltshire KG, KB (24 November 1427 – 8 May 1473) was an English nobleman, the youngest son of Humphrey Stafford, 1st Duke of Buckingham. In 1461 he was appointed Knight of the Order of the Bath.

== Career ==
He fought on the Yorkist side at the Battle of Hexham in 1464. In 1469, he was made Steward of the Duchy of Cornwall for life. He was made Earl of Wiltshire on 5 January 1470 by King Edward IV, and was briefly arrested under Warwick's government and prevented from attending the Parliament of November 1470 (he was one of six Yorkist nobles not to receive a summons).

In return for his loyalty he was made Chief Butler of England, and was empowered, with Lord Mountjoy to pardon rebels who surrendered by 7 June that year. He was made a Knight of the Garter in 1472.

== Diplomacy ==
He did act for some time as a diplomat, working with the Earl of Northumberland to deal with ambassadors of James III of Scotland about national grievances.

== Personal life ==
He married Constance Green, daughter of Sir Henry Green of Drayton House Northamptonshire and Margaret de Ros. They only had one child, Edward, who succeeded him as Earl of Wiltshire, although during the latter's minority he was kept as a ward of the King, meaning revenues from his estates were paid to the Crown.

== Ancestors ==
Ancestors of John Stafford, 1st Earl of Wiltshire

8. Hugh de Stafford, 2nd Earl of Stafford
4. Edmund Stafford, 5th Earl of Stafford
9. Philippa de Beauchamp
2. Humphrey Stafford, 1st Duke of Buckingham
10. Thomas of Woodstock, 1st Duke of Gloucester
5. Anne of Gloucester
11. Eleanor de Bohun
1. John Stafford, 1st Earl of Wiltshire
12. John de Neville
6. Ralph Neville, 1st Earl of Westmorland
13. Maud Percy
3. Anne Neville
14. John of Gaunt, 1st Duke of Lancaster
7. Joan Beaufort, Countess of Westmorland
15. Katherine Swynford

Political offices
Preceded by John Wenlock, 1st Baron Wenlock	Chief Butler of England; 1471–1473	Succeeded by Anthony Woodville, 2nd Earl Rivers
Peerage of England
New creation	Earl of Wiltshire; 1470–1473	Succeeded by Edward Stafford, 2nd Earl of Wiltshire
