= John Clinton, 1st Baron Clinton =

English nobleman

Arms of de Clinton, Barons Clinton: Argent, six crosses crosslet fitchée sable three two and one on a chief azure two mullets or pierced gules

John de Clinton, 1st Baron Clinton (died 1315) was an English peer.

Clinton was a knight who had served in the Scottish and French wars. He was summoned to Parliament as Lord Clinton in February 1299. Clinton was Knight of the Shire for Warwickshire between 1300 and 1301 and Constable of Wallingford Castle in 1308. He married Ida de Odingsells, who was the granddaughter of Ida II Longespee. He died in 1315 and was succeeded by his son John.

== Sources ==
- Kidd, Charles, Williamson, David (editors). Debrett's Peerage and Baronetage (1990 edition). New York: St Martin's Press, 1990.
- Leigh Rayment's Peerage Pages

Peerage of England
New creation	Baron Clinton; 1299–1315	Succeeded by John Clinton
