= John Clinton, 5th Baron Clinton =

15th century English noble

Arms of de Clinton, Barons Clinton:Argent, six crosses crosslet fitchée sable three two and one on a chief azure two mullets or pierced gules

John de Clinton, 5th Baron Clinton (died 1464) was an English peer.

== Life ==
John was the eldest son of William de Clinton, 4th Lord Clinton and Alice de Botreaux daughter of William de Botreaux, 2nd Baron Botreaux. Succeeding his father in 1431, he exchanged Maxstoke for Whiston and Woodford in Northamptonshire with Humphrey Stafford, 6th Earl of Stafford, Acting as the garrison commander of Pontoise in France, he was captured during the siege and taking of the town and castle by the French in 1441. In captivity for more than six years until he ransomed for 6,000 marks. John relinquished his claim to the Barony of Saye in favour of Sir James Fiennes in 1448.

John was attainted for his Yorkist sympathies in 1459, however he was restored to his titles in 1461.

== Marriages and issue ==
He married firstly Joan, daughter of Edmund Ferrers of Chartley and Ellen Roche, they are known to have had the following issue:

- John Clinton, 6th Baron Clinton.

He married secondly Margaret, daughter of John St. Leger and Margaret Donet.

== Citations ==
Peerage of England
Preceded by William Clinton	Baron Clinton; 1431–1464	Succeeded by John Clinton
