= Buckingham's rebellion =

1483 uprising in England and Wales

- Part of the Wars of the Roses
Date	10 October – 25 November 1483
Location	England and Wales
Result	Victory for Richard III

Belligerents
House of York (Ricardian Yorkist)	House of York (Edwardian Yorkist); House of Tudor (Lancastrian); Supported by: Duchy of Brittany

Commanders and leaders
Richard III; Duke of Norfolk	Duke of Buckingham (executed); Henry Tudor

Buckingham's rebellion was a failed but significant uprising, or collection of uprisings, of October 1483 in England and parts of Wales against King Richard III of England.

To the extent that these local risings had a central coordination, the plot revolved around Henry Stafford, 2nd Duke of Buckingham, who had become disaffected from Richard, and had backing from the exiled Henry Tudor (the future king Henry VII) and his mother Margaret Beaufort. Rebels took arms against the king, who had deposed Edward V in June of that year. They included many loyalists of Edward V, and others, who had been Yorkist supporters of his father Edward IV.

Seven ships from Brittany carrying over 500 Breton soldiers, Henry Tudor, and many of his supporters were to have risen simultaneously against Richard III. A gale prevented this planned landing from being successfully carried out, and in England a premature uprising in Kent forewarned Richard that Buckingham had changed sides.

== Background ==
When his brother King Edward IV died in April 1483, Richard of Gloucester was named Lord Protector of the realm for Edward's son and successor, the 12-year-old Edward V. As the young king travelled to London from Ludlow with a large and armed entourage, Richard intercepted the party with his own forces and escorted him to lodgings in the Tower of London, where Edward V's own brother Prince Richard of Shrewsbury joined him shortly afterwards. Arrangements were made for Edward's coronation on 22 June 1483; but, before the young king could be crowned, his father's marriage to his mother Elizabeth Woodville was declared invalid, making their children illegitimate and ineligible for the throne. Historians widely agree that Richard took the two princes into custody by force and orchestrated their illegitimacy for his own political gain.

On the 25 June, an assembly of Lords and commoners endorsed the claims. The following day, Richard III began his reign, and he was crowned on the 6 July 1483. The young princes were not seen in public after August, and accusations circulated that the boys had been murdered on Richard's orders, giving rise to the legend of the Princes in the Tower.

In late September 1483 a conspiracy arose among a number of disaffected gentry, many of whom had been supporters of Edward IV and the "whole Yorkist establishment". The conspiracy was nominally led by Richard's former ally and first cousin once removed Henry Stafford, 2nd Duke of Buckingham, although it had begun as a Woodville-Beaufort conspiracy (being "well under way" by the time of the duke's involvement). Indeed, Davies has suggested that it was "only the subsequent parliamentary attainder that placed Buckingham at the centre of events", in order to blame a single disaffected magnate motivated by greed, rather than "the embarrassing truth" that those opposing Richard were actually "overwhelmingly Edwardian loyalists".

It is possible that they planned to depose Richard III and place Edward V back on the throne, and that when rumours arose that Edward and his brother were dead, Buckingham proposed that Henry Tudor, Earl of Richmond should return from exile, take the throne and marry Elizabeth of York, elder sister of the Tower Princes.

The Lancastrian claim to the throne had descended to Henry Tudor on the death of Henry VI and his son Edward of Westminster in 1471, thus ending the line of Henry IV. Henry's father, Edmund Tudor, 1st Earl of Richmond, had been a half-brother of Henry VI on their mother’s side, but Henry's claim to royalty was through his own mother, Margaret Beaufort. She was a granddaughter of John Beaufort, who was the second oldest son of John of Gaunt, the third son of Edward III. John Beaufort had been illegitimate at birth, though later legitimised by the marriage of his parents. Henry had spent much of his childhood under siege in Harlech Castle or in exile in Brittany. After 1471, Edward IV had preferred to belittle Henry's pretensions to the crown, and made only sporadic attempts to secure him. However, his mother, Margaret Beaufort, had been twice remarried, first to Buckingham's uncle, and then to Thomas, Lord Stanley, one of Edward's principal officers, and continually promoted her son's rights.

Buckingham's precise motivation has been called "obscure"; he had been treated well by Richard. The traditional naming of the rebellion after him has been labelled a misnomer, with John Morton and Reginald Bray more plausible leaders.

== Conspiracy ==
The plan was for forces to assemble at Maidstone, Guildford and Essex and march on London in a feint. Other forces would gather at Newbury and Salisbury. The Bishop of Exeter would lead a revolt in Devon. Buckingham would lead an army from Wales to England, join with Exeter and then join with Henry Tudor. Henry would lead an army of 3,500, provided by the treasurer of Brittany Pierre Landais. He would then join with Exeter and Buckingham. Henry, in exile in Brittany, enjoyed the support of the Breton treasurer Pierre Landais, who hoped Buckingham's victory would cement an alliance between Brittany and England. However, Kent launched their rebellion 10 days early and announced Buckingham as their leader, drawing attention to his involvement. Richard acted fast. He nominated Ralph de Ashton as Vice- Constable of England, (as Buckingham was constable) with power to arrest, bring to trial and attain conspirators. The Duke of Norfolk moved 100 men to the Thames Estuary to block forces from Kent and Essex joining. At Leicester, Richard declared bounties on the rebel heads: 1000 pounds for Buckingham, or 100 pounds a year for life, 1000 marks (660 pounds) for Marquess of Dorset and his uncle Lionel Woodville, Bishop of Salisbury and 500 marks for other leading insurgents.

Some of Henry Tudor's ships ran into a storm and were forced to return to Brittany or Normandy, while Henry and two ships anchored off Plymouth. He was confronted by a group of supporters of the king, and fled to Brittany. Here he learned of Buckingham's failure.

For his part, Buckingham raised a substantial force from his estates in Wales and the Marches, with a plan to join with Exeter and his brother Edward Courtenay. Buckingham's army was troubled by the same storm and were unable to communicate with Courtenay and deserted when Richard's forces came against them. Richard in the field defeated the rising in a few weeks.

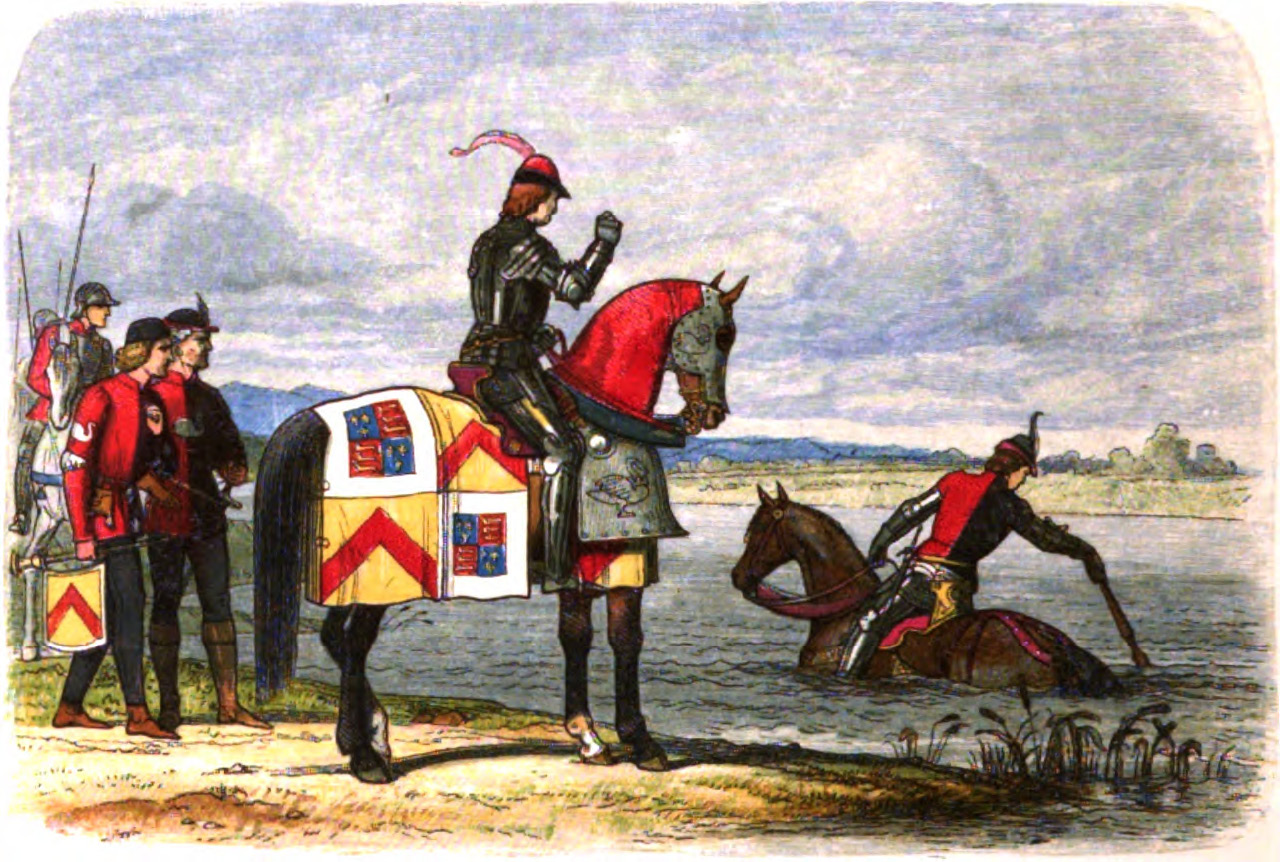
Buckingham finds the River Severn swollen after heavy rain, blocking his way to join the other conspirators.

Buckingham tried to escape in disguise, but was either turned in by Ralph Bannaster for the bounty Richard had put on his head, or was discovered in hiding with him. He was convicted of treason and beheaded in Salisbury, near the Bull's Head Inn, on 2 November. His widow, Catherine Woodville, later married Jasper Tudor, the uncle of Henry Tudor, who was in the process of organising another rebellion.

== Consequences ==
In military terms it was a complete failure. It did, however, deepen the opinion of many towards Richard as king, and its effect over the next few months was to drive a number of leading figures into Henry Tudor's camp. Five hundred Englishmen slipped through the King's net and found their way to Rennes, the capital of Brittany, where in desperation or fresh expectation they forged an alliance with the Earl of Richmond.

The failure of Buckingham's revolt was clearly not the end of the plots against Richard, who could never again feel secure, and who also suffered the loss of his wife in March 1485 and eleven-year-old son in April 1484, putting the future of the Yorkist dynasty in doubt.

Richard made overtures to Landais, offering military support for Landais's weak regime under Duke Francis II of Brittany in exchange for Henry. Henry fled to Paris, where he secured support from the French regent Anne of Beaujeu, who supplied troops for an invasion in 1485. Henry gained the support of the Woodvilles, in-laws of the late Edward IV, and sailed with a small French and Scottish force, landing in Mill Bay, Pembrokeshire, close to his birthplace on 7 August 1485. Forces under Henry defeated and killed Richard during the battle of Bosworth Field on 22 August and Henry subsequently became king of England under the name of Henry VII.

== Rebels ==
Name	Area	Position	Part in rebellion	Aftermath
Sir Robert Willoughby	Brooke in Westbury, Wiltshire	High Sheriff of Devon and High Sheriff of Cornwall under Edward IV	Openly supported Henry of Richmond	Joined Richmond in Brittany. Fought at Bosworth, became Lord Steward and created Robert Willoughby, 1st Baron Willoughby de Broke
Thomas Grey, 1st Marquess of Dorset	Westminster Abbey in sanctuary as Richard took the throne, Yorkshire, Exeter	Constable of the Tower of London for Edward V	Openly supported Henry of Richmond in Exeter	Joined Richmond in Brittany.
Edward Courtenay	South-west England	Commission of the peace in Cornwall		He went to Brittany, and was attainted in 1484. He took part in the battle of Bosworth, and was created Earl of Devon by Henry VII.
Giles Daubeny	South-west England	Esquire for the king's body	Planning	Joined Richmond in Brittany. Fought at Bosworth
Richard Guildford	Kent		Planning	Joined Richmond in Brittany. Fought at Bosworth
John Fogge	Kent	Chamberlain	Liaison between Guildford and Bray	Attainted after the rebellion; restored in February 1485.
Amias Paulet	Somerset, south-west England	Landowner		Attainted after the rebellion; restored in 1485.
John Cheyne			Rebel leader in Salisbury.	
Richard Hill	Diocese of Salisbury, southern England	Cleric	Probable support of local rebels	Suffered loss of income; may have become a supporter of Richmond at this point.
Walter Hungerford of Farleigh	Wiltshire	Rebel leader		Pardoned, confined briefly to the Tower of London.
John Morton	In Buckingham's custody in Brecon Castle	Bishop of Ely, conspirator	Planning	Attainted, escaped to Flanders, pardoned December 1484 but went to Rome.
Thomas Nandyke	At Brecon with Buckingham and Morton.	Astrologer		He took part in a later revolt against Richard around Colchester, and was outlawed.
Reginald Bray	North-west England and Wales	Conspirator and go-between	Liaison between Morton and Margaret Beaufort. Recruited Daubeny, Cheyne, Richard Guildford	Pardoned January 1484.
Thomas St. Leger	Devon	Landowner	Fought in Exeter	Imprisoned in Exeter. Beheaded in Exeter Castle, 13 November 1483
Sir George Browne	Kent	Landowner and sheriff	Rebel leader	Imprisoned in the Tower. Beheaded on Tower Hill, 4 December 1483

== Loyalists ==
Name	Position	Part in rebellion	Aftermath
Ralph de Ashton	Vice-constable of England.	Defended London for the king.	Rewarded with land in Kent.
John Howard, 1st Duke of Norfolk	Military commander	Defended Kent for the king.	Killed at the Battle of Bosworth on the king's side.

== Notes ==
- Ross, C. (2011). Richard III. The English Monarchs Series (in German). Yale University Press. ISBN 978-0-300-22974-5.
