= John Clinton, 7th Baron Clinton =

English peer

Sir John Clinton, 7th Lord Clinton, KB (c. 1470 – 4 June 1514) was an English peer. He was also known as John Fiennes.

== Origins ==
John Clinton was born about 1470/71 in Folkestone, Kent. He was the son of Sir John Clinton, 6th Lord Clinton (c.1429 - 29 Feb 1487/88) and Elizabeth Fiennes.

== Titles ==
John Clinton succeeded to the title of 7th Lord Clinton on 29 February 1487/88.

He was invested as a Knight, Order of the Bath (K.B.) on 14 November 1501.

== Family ==
John Clinton married twice. His first wife was Elizabeth Morgan, daughter of Sir John Morgan of Tredegar, Monmouthshire, Wales, whom he married before 1490.

His second wife was Anne West, daughter of Thomas West, 8th Baron de la Warr (d. 1525), whom he married before 1501.

Sir John died on 4 June 1514. He was succeeded by his son by Elizabeth Morgan, Thomas Clinton, 8th Baron Clinton.

Peerage of England
Preceded by John Clinton	Baron Clinton; 1488–1514	Succeeded by Thomas Clinton
