= Margaret Beaufort, Countess of Stafford =

English noblewoman

Margaret Beaufort
- Countess of Stafford
- Born: 1437
- Died: 1474 (aged 36–37)
- Spouses: Humphrey Stafford, Earl of Stafford; Sir Richard Dayrell
- Issue: Henry Stafford, 2nd Duke of Buckingham; Margaret Dayrell, Baroness Audley
- Father: Edmund Beaufort, 2nd Duke of Somerset
- Mother: Lady Eleanor Beauchamp

Margaret Beaufort (c. 1437 – 1474) was a younger daughter of Edmund Beaufort, 2nd Duke of Somerset and Lady Eleanor Beauchamp. Her father was leader of the Lancastrian side in the Wars of the Roses. Margaret married Humphrey, eldest son of Humphrey Stafford, 1st Duke of Buckingham, who held the courtesy title of Earl of Stafford.

Margaret's father led the Lancastrian forces in the First Battle of St Albans (22 May 1455) against his main rival Richard Plantagenet, 3rd Duke of York and was killed. Her husband was badly wounded, but did not die until three years later, possibly of the plague. Shortly after the battle Margaret gave birth to a son Henry, who became his grandfather's heir and succeeded as Duke of Buckingham as an infant. After Humphrey's death Margaret married Sir Richard Dayrell, younger son of William Dayrell of Littlecote, who was sub-treasurer of England. Their daughter Margaret married James Tuchet, 7th Baron Audley.

== Ancestry ==
Ancestors of Margaret Beaufort, Countess of Stafford

16. Edward III of England
8. John of Gaunt, 1st Duke of Lancaster
17. Philippa of Hainault
4. John Beaufort, 1st Earl of Somerset
18. Sir Payne de Roet
9. Katherine Swynford
2. Edmund Beaufort, 2nd Duke of Somerset
20. Thomas Holland, 1st Earl of Kent
10. Thomas Holland, 2nd Earl of Kent
21. Joan, 4th Countess of Kent
5. Margaret Holland
22. Richard FitzAlan, 10th Earl of Arundel
11. Alice FitzAlan
23. Eleanor of Lancaster
1. Margaret Beaufort, Countess of Stafford
24. Thomas de Beauchamp, 11th Earl of Warwick
12. Thomas de Beauchamp, 12th Earl of Warwick
25. Katherine Mortimer
6. Richard Beauchamp, 13th Earl of Warwick
26. William Ferrers, 3rd Baron Ferrers of Groby
13. Margaret Ferrers
27. Margaret de Ufford
3. Eleanor Beauchamp
28. Maurice de Berkeley, 4th Baron Berkeley
14. Thomas de Berkeley, 5th Baron Berkeley
29. Elizabeth le Despenser
7. Elizabeth de Berkeley
30. Warine de Lisle, 2nd Baron Lisle
15. Margaret de Lisle, 3rd Baroness Lisle
31. Margaret Pipard

== Sources ==
- Weir, Alison. Britain's Royal Families: The Complete Genealogy. London: Vintage Books, 2008. ISBN 0-09-953973-X.
