= Humphrey Stafford, Earl of Stafford =

English nobleman (c. 1425–1458)

Humphrey Stafford
- Earl of Stafford
- Arms of Stafford: Or, a chevron gules
- Born: c. 1425
- Died: 22 May 1458
- Noble family: Stafford
- Spouse: Margaret Beaufort, Countess of Stafford
- Issue: Henry Stafford, 2nd Duke of Buckingham
- Father: Humphrey Stafford, 1st Duke of Buckingham
- Mother: Lady Anne Neville

Humphrey Stafford (c. 1425 – 22 May 1458), generally known by his courtesy title of Earl of Stafford, was the eldest son of Humphrey Stafford, 1st Duke of Buckingham and Lady Anne Neville (d. 1480).

== Biography ==
Humphrey Stafford was born on 2 December 1425, the elder twin brother of Henry. His maternal grandparents were Ralph de Neville, 1st Earl of Westmorland and Joan Beaufort, Countess of Westmorland. His maternal uncles included (among others) Richard Neville, 5th Earl of Salisbury (father of Warwick, the Kingmaker), Robert Neville who was first Bishop of Salisbury and then Bishop of Durham, William Neville, 1st Earl of Kent and Edward Nevill, 3rd Baron Bergavenny. His most prominent maternal aunt was Cecily Neville, wife of Richard Plantagenet, 3rd Duke of York and mother to among others Edward IV of England, Edmund, Earl of Rutland, George Plantagenet, 1st Duke of Clarence, Richard III of England, Anne, Duchess of Exeter, Elizabeth, Duchess of Suffolk, and Margaret, Duchess of Burgundy. Other maternal aunts included Eleanor Percy (née Neville), 2nd Countess of Northumberland, and Katherine Mowbray (née Neville), 2nd Duchess of Norfolk.

Lord Stafford fought under his father-in-law in support of the House of Lancaster during the First Battle of St Albans. He appears to have been badly wounded at this battle, but eventually died either of his wounds or from the plague, predeceasing his own father in 1458.

Stafford married Lady Margaret Beaufort, daughter of Edmund Beaufort, 2nd Duke of Somerset and Lady Eleanor Beauchamp. Humphrey's brother married Margaret's cousin. Lady Margaret was a sister of Henry Beaufort, 3rd Duke of Somerset (executed 15 May 1464 after the Battle of Hexham) and Edmund Beaufort, 4th Duke of Somerset (executed 6 May 1471 after the Battle of Tewkesbury). Her maternal grandparents were Richard de Beauchamp, 13th Earl of Warwick and his first wife Elizabeth Berkeley. By her father, she was a niece of Joan Beaufort, Queen of Scots and a cousin to Lady Margaret Beaufort (mother of King Henry VII). By her mother, Lady Margaret was a niece of Anne de Beauchamp, 16th Countess of Warwick and as such, a cousin to Isabel, Duchess of Clarence and queen consort Anne Neville.

Lord and Lady Stafford had two sons, Henry Stafford (1455–1483) and Humphrey Stafford. Henry was styled Earl of Stafford on his father's death in 1458 and succeeded his paternal grandfather as Duke of Buckingham following the latter's death at the Battle of Northampton on 10 July 1460.

== Ancestors ==
Ancestors of Humphrey Stafford, Earl of Stafford

8. Hugh de Stafford, 2nd Earl of Stafford
4. Edmund Stafford, 5th Earl of Stafford
9. Philippa de Beauchamp
2. Humphrey Stafford, 1st Duke of Buckingham
10. Thomas of Woodstock, 1st Duke of Gloucester
5. Anne of Gloucester
11. Eleanor de Bohun
1. Humphrey Stafford, Earl of Stafford
12. John de Neville
6. Ralph Neville, 1st Earl of Westmorland
13. Maud Percy
3. Anne Neville
14. John of Gaunt, 1st Duke of Lancaster
7. Joan Beaufort, Countess of Westmorland
15. Katherine Swynford
