= Henry Stafford, 2nd Duke of Buckingham =

English nobleman (1455–1483)

His Grace The Duke of Buckingham KG
- Coat of Arms of Sir Henry Stafford, 2nd Duke of Buckingham, KG

Lord High Constable of England
- In office July 1483 – 2 November 1483
- Monarch: Richard III
- Preceded by: The Duke of Gloucester
- Succeeded by: Thomas Stanley, 2nd Baron Stanley

Personal details
- Born: 4 September 1455
- Died: 2 November 1483 (aged 28) Salisbury, Wiltshire
- Spouse: Katherine Woodville
- Relations: Stafford
- Children: Edward Stafford, 3rd Duke of Buckingham; Elizabeth Stafford, Countess of Sussex; Henry Stafford, 1st Earl of Wiltshire; Anne Stafford, Countess of Huntingdon; Humphrey Stafford
- Parents: Humphrey, Earl of Stafford; Margaret Beaufort, Countess of Stafford

Henry Stafford, 2nd Duke of Buckingham (4 September 1455 – 2 November 1483), was an English nobleman known as the namesake of Buckingham's rebellion, a failed but significant collection of uprisings in England and parts of Wales against Richard III of England in October 1483. He was executed without trial for his role in the uprisings. Stafford is also one of the primary suspects in the disappearance (and presumed murder) of Richard's nephews, the Princes in the Tower.

== Life ==
The only son of Humphrey Stafford, Earl of Stafford, and Margaret Beaufort, Countess of Stafford, Buckingham became Earl of Stafford in 1458 upon his father's death, and was made a ward of King Edward IV. He became the Duke of Buckingham at age 4 in 1460 following the death of his grandfather, Humphrey Stafford, 1st Duke of Buckingham, at the Battle of Northampton. In February 1466, at age 10, he was married to Katherine Woodville, youngest sister of Edward IV's wife Elizabeth Woodville, and daughter to Richard Woodville, 1st Earl Rivers; she was only around 8 at the time. Buckingham and his wife had five children:

- Edward Stafford, 3rd Duke of Buckingham (3 February 1478 – 17 May 1521)
- Elizabeth Stafford, Countess of Sussex (c. 1479 – 11 May 1532)
- Henry Stafford, 1st Earl of Wiltshire (c. 1479 – 6 April 1523)
- Anne Stafford, Countess of Huntingdon (c. 1483 – 1544)
- Humphrey Stafford (died young)

Upon the death of Edward IV in 1483, Buckingham allied himself to the king's younger brother the Duke of Gloucester, helping him succeed to the throne as Richard III in lieu of Edward and Elizabeth's living sons Edward V and Richard of Shrewsbury. Becoming disaffected with Richard, Buckingham then joined with Henry Tudor and Tudor's mother, Margaret Beaufort, leading an unsuccessful rebellion in his name. For his part, Buckingham raised a militia from his estates in Wales and the Marches, which he was to lead into England to join other rebels; but the rivers Wye and Severn were in flood and impassable, and after waiting ten days his men dispersed. Buckingham fled in disguise into Shropshire but was discovered hidden at Lacon Park near Wem, having been betrayed by a retainer, Ralph Bannister.

Buckingham was executed for treason by Richard on 2 November 1483: he was beheaded in the courtyard between the Blue Boar Inn and the Saracen's Head Inn (both demolished in the 18th century) in Salisbury market-place. His burial place is uncertain; a tomb inside the parish church at Britford, near Salisbury, may be his.

Buckingham's precise motivation has been called "obscure"; he had been treated well by Richard. The traditional naming of the rebellion after him has been labelled a misnomer, with John Morton and Reginald Bray more plausible leaders.

== The Princes in the Tower ==
As Richard III's ally, the plausibility of Buckingham as a suspect depends on the princes having already been dead by the time Stafford was executed in November 1483. It has been suggested that Buckingham had several potential motives. As a descendant of Edward III, through John of Gaunt, 1st Duke of Lancaster and Thomas of Woodstock, 1st Duke of Gloucester on his father's side, as well as through John of Gaunt through John Beaufort, son of John of Gaunt on his mother's side, Buckingham may have hoped to accede to the throne himself in due course; alternatively, he may have been acting on behalf of a third party.

Some, notably Paul Murray Kendall, regard Buckingham as the likeliest suspect: his execution, after he had rebelled against Richard in October 1483, might signify that he and the king had fallen out (but Alison Weir takes this as a sign that Richard had murdered the princes without Buckingham's knowledge and Buckingham had been shocked by it). A contemporary Portuguese document suggests Buckingham as the guilty party, stating,

... and after the passing away of king Edward in the year of 83, another one of his brothers, the Duke of Gloucester, had in his power the Prince of Wales and the Duke of York, the young sons of the said king his brother, and turned them to the Duke of Buckingham, under whose custody the said Princes were starved to death.

A document dated some decades after the disappearance was found within the archives of the College of Arms in London in 1980; this stated that the murder "be the vise of the Duke of Buckingham". This led Michael Bennett to suggest that possibly some of Richard's prominent supporters, Buckingham and Tyrell, murdered the princes on their own initiative without waiting for Richard's orders. Bennett noted in support of this theory: "After the King's departure Buckingham was in effective command in the capital, and it is known that when the two men met a month later there was an unholy row between them."

Buckingham is the only person to be named as responsible in a contemporary chronicle other than Richard himself. However, for two reasons he is unlikely to have acted alone. First of all, if he were guilty of acting without Richard's orders it is extremely surprising that Richard did not lay the blame for the princes' murder on Buckingham after Buckingham was disgraced and executed, especially as Richard could potentially have cleared his own name by doing so. Secondly, Weir argues that it is likely he would have required Richard's help to gain access to the princes, under close guard in the Tower of London, although Kendall argued that, as Constable of England, responsible for the Tower, he might have been exempt from this ruling.

As a result, although it is extremely possible that he was implicated in the decision to murder them, the hypothesis that Buckingham acted without Richard's knowledge is not widely accepted by historians. While Jeremy Potter suggested that Richard would have kept silent had Buckingham been guilty because nobody would have believed Richard was not party to the crime, he further notes that "Historians are agreed that Buckingham would never have dared to act without Richard's complicity or, at least, connivance". However, Potter also hypothesised that perhaps Buckingham was fantasising about seizing the crown himself at this point and saw the murder of the princes as a first step to achieving this goal. This theory formed the basis of Sharon Penman's historical novel The Sunne in Splendour.

== In fiction ==
Buckingham is among the major characters featured in William Shakespeare's play Richard III, which portrays him as a man openly allying with Richard III in his schemes until he is ordered to kill the Princes in the Tower. In Colley Cibber's 1699 adaptation of Shakespeare's play, he is the subject of the notable line "Off with his head! So much for Buckingham!"

In Sharon Kay Penman's 1982 debut novel The Sunne in Splendour, Buckingham is depicted as the murderer of the Princes in the Tower. He is a supporting character in Philippa Gregory's 2009 historical novel The White Queen (2009) and a central character in Susan Higginbotham's historical fiction novel, The Stolen Crown (2010), which deals with his associations with King Edward IV and King Richard III.

Buckingham is the major character and storyteller in Isolde Martyn's historical novel The Devil in Ermine (2013), which deals with the events of 1483. As Henry Stafford, he is the lead character in J. P. Reedman's A Man Who Would be King (2017), which tells his story from his own first-person viewpoint, and portrays him as desiring the throne for himself.

== See also ==
- Buckingham College, Cambridge

Honorary titles
Preceded by The Duke of Gloucester	Lord High Constable; 1483	Succeeded by Thomas Stanley, 2nd Baron Stanley
Peerage of England
Preceded by Humphrey Stafford	Duke of Buckingham; 1460–1483	Vacant Forfeit Title next held by Edward Stafford as duke from 1485
