= John Clinton, 6th Baron Clinton =

English peer

Sir John Clinton, 6th Baron Clinton (c. 1429 – 29 February 1488), of Maxstoke, was an English peer.

He was the son of John de Clinton, 5th Baron Clinton (1410–1464) and Joan Ferrers.

In 1471, his titles as Baron Clinton and Say were acknowledged following his succession on 24 September 1464. However, he was never called to Parliament under either title. He died on 29 February 1488. He was buried at Greyfriars, London.

== Family ==
Sir John Clinton married twice. His first wife was Elizabeth Fiennes, Lady Clinton (born c.1455), daughter of Sir Richard Fiennes, 7th Baron Dacre and Joan Dacre, 7th Baroness Dacre, whom he married in about 1463 at Herstmonceux, Sussex. They had one son, John Clinton, 7th Baron Clinton, born in 1471 in Folkestone, Kent, who died on 4 June 1514.

His second wife was Anne Stafford, daughter of Sir Humphrey Stafford.

== Notes ==
Peerage of England
Preceded by John Clinton	Baron Clinton; 1464–1488	Succeeded by John Clinton
