= Russell (given name) =

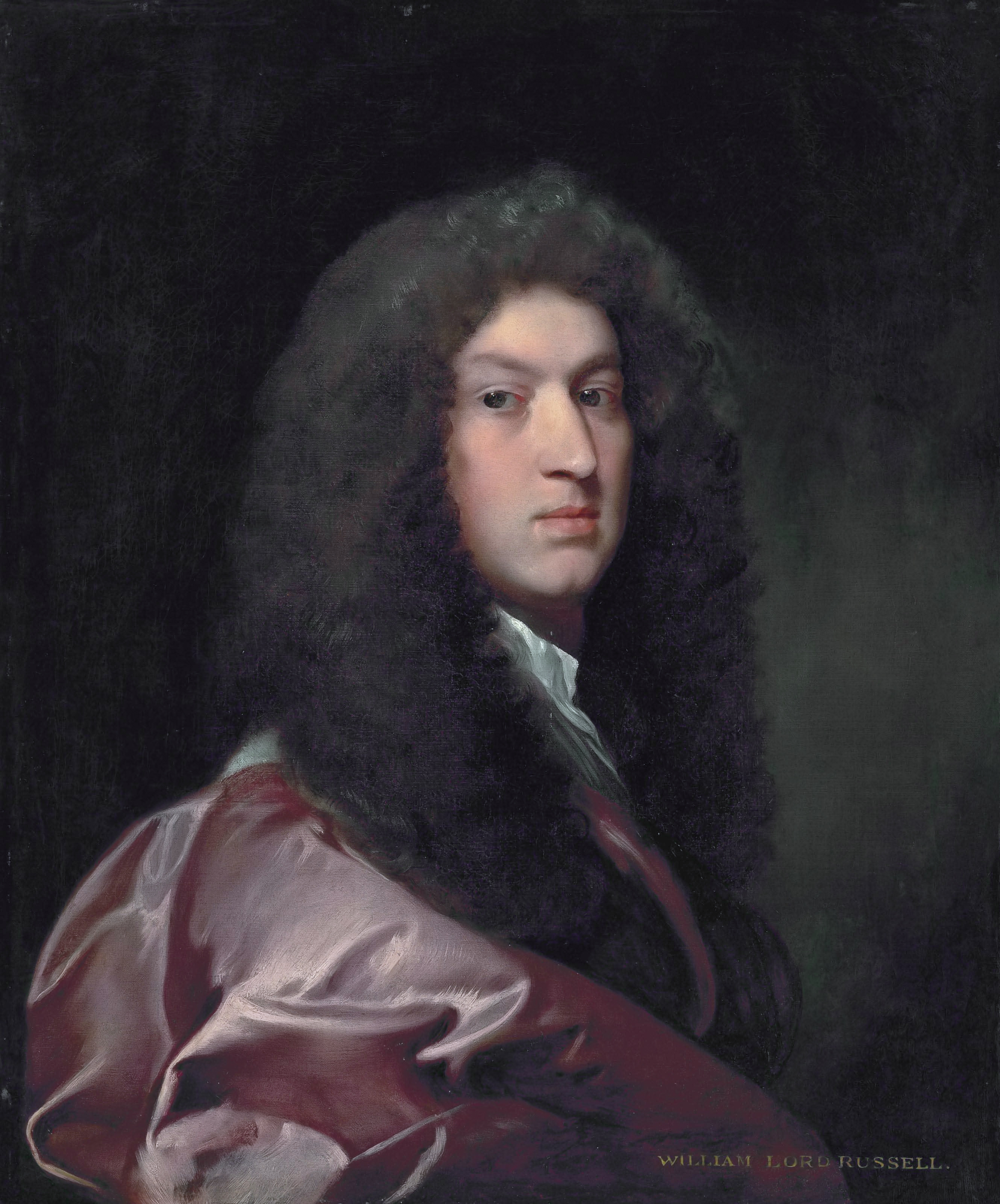
- William Russell, Lord Russell (1639–1683) inspired a number of namesakes.
- Gender: Masculine
- Language: English

Origin
- Meaning: Redhead

Other names
- Short forms: Russ, Rusty

Russell is a given name that originated from the surname Russell, which in turn derives from the French name russel (Old Norse rossel) "red-haired, from rus (Old Norse ros) "red hair color" and the suffix -el.

The name came into greater use in England as a first name after the execution of William Russell, Lord Russell for treason in 1683; supporters who believed his trial was unjust named their sons in his honour. Some American patriots considered Lord Russell a victim of a tyrannical British monarchy and a "martyr for liberty" and also named sons after him. Russell was the 197th most popular name for newborn boys in the United States in 1880 and reached the height of its popularity in 1914 when it was the 49th most popular name for American boys. It has remained in regular use in the Anglosphere throughout the 20th and 21st centuries. Russell might be shortened to Russ or Rusty, which is a modern English hypocorism for a boy with red hair as well as a nickname for Russell.

Notable people with the name include:

== People ==
- Russell A. Alger (1836–1907), American politician and businessman
- Russell A. Berg (1917–2002), American Air Force brigadier general
- Russell A. Gausman (1892–1963), American set decorator
- Russell A. Livigni (born 1934), American rubber industry scientist and executive
- Russell A. Rourke (1931–2003), American lawyer and public official
- Russell A. Sanborn, American Marine major general
- Russell A. Steindam (1946–1970), American Army officer
- Russell Aaron Boyd, real name of Dutch Boyd (born 1980), American professional poker player
- Russell Abrams, American hedge fund manager and entrepreneur
- Russell Adams, several people
- Russell Aitken (born 1985), Australian former professional rugby league footballer
- Russell Aitken (RAF officer) (1913–1989), New Zealand Royal Air Force officer during World War II
- Russell Alan Hulse (born 1950), American physicist
- Russell Aldridge (1831–1895), English cricketer
- Russell Alexander (1877–1915), American entertainer and composer
- Russell Allen (disambiguation), several people
- Russell Allport (?–1914), Australian electrical engineer
- Russell Alton McNutt (1914–2008), American engineer
- Russell Anderson (disambiguation), several people
- Russell Arch, American director, writer, and animator
- Russell Arlett, real name of Buzz Arlett (1899–1964), American MLB player
- Russell Arms (1920–2012), American actor and singer
- Russell Armstrong (?–2011), American first husband of Taylor Armstrong
- Russell Arthur Missin (1922–2002), English cathedral organist
- Russell Artzt (born 1947), American businessman and software developer
- Russell Ash (1946–2010), British author
- Russell Atkins (1926–2024), American poet, playwright, and composer
- Russell Aukerman (1873–1960), American professional football player-coach
- Russell Awkard (1917–2002), American Negro league player
- Russell Ayto (born 1960), English author and illustrator of children's books
- Russell B. Farr, Australian editor and writer of speculative fiction
- Russell B. Livermore (1894–1958), American lawyer, politician, and veteran of both World Wars
- Russell B. Long (1918–2003), American politician
- Russell B. Shepherd (1829–1901), American businessman and politician
- Russell Baker (1925–2019), American journalist, narrator, and writer
- Russell Balda, American ornithologist
- Russell Balding (born 1952), Australian accountant and company director
- Russell Ball (1891–1942), American photographer
- Russell Banks (1940–2023), American writer
- Russell Bannock (1919–2020), Canadian Air Force pilot during World War II
- Russell Barber (1911–1996), American curler
- Russell Barkley (born 1949), American clinical neuropsychologist and professor of psychiatry
- Russell Barlow (born 1962), Australian former professional tennis player
- Russell Barnes (born 1968), British television producer and director
- Russell Barr (born 1953), Scottish Presbyterian minister
- Russell Barr Williamson (1893–1964), American architect
- Russell Barry (1890–1976), British Anglican bishop, author, and World War I personnel
- Russell Bartlett, British businessman and property investor
- Russell Barton (1830–1916), British-born Australian politician
- Russell Basser (born 1960), Australian former Olympic water polo player
- Russell Bassett (1845–1918), American stage- and film actor
- Russell Batiste Jr. (1965–2023), American drummer
- Russell Bawden (born 1973), Australian former professional rugby league footballer
- Russell Baze (born 1958), Canadian-American horse racing jockey
- Russell Beardsmore (born 1968), English former footballer
- Russell Beck (1941–2018), New Zealand archaeologist, museum curator, and artist
- Russell Bedsole (born 1975), American politician and law enforcement officer
- Russell Begaye, American Navajo politician
- Russell Beichly (1902–1996), American college basketball coach
- Russell Beiersdorf (born 1965), American professional golfer
- Russell Bencraft (1858–1943), English cricketer, sports administrator, medical doctor, businessman, and philanthropist
- Russell Bennett (rugby union) (born 1971), South African former rugby union player
- Russell Bentley (1960–2024), American Army soldier, blogger, communist, cannabis activist, politician, and murder victim
- Russell Bentley (politician) (born 1946), American politician
- Russell Berman (born 1950), American academic and professor of German studies and comparative literature
- Russell Bishop, several people
- Russell Black, American politician
- Russell Blackburne (1886–1968), American MLB player, manager, and coach
- Russell Blackford (born 1954), Australian writer, philosopher, and literary critic
- Russell Blackwell, American anarchist, activist, and cartographer
- Russell Blair (1907–1994), American politician
- Russell Blake, several people
- Russell Blattner (1908–2002), American pediatrician
- Russell Blaylock (born 1945), American writer and neurosurgeon
- Russell Blew (born 1941), Australian former VFL player
- Russell Blunt (1908–2004), American high school- and collegiate track- and basketball coach
- Russell Boaden (born 1969), Australian Paralympic sailor
- Russell Boardman (1898–1933), American aviation pioneer
- Russell Boast (born 1972), South African-born American professor, and casting director and producer of film and television
- Russell Bodine (born 1992), American former NFL player
- Russell Bohling (born 1991), English man who disappeared in 2010
- Russell Boulter (born 1963), English actor, documentary narrator, and communications coach
- Russell Bowers (born 1952), American politician
- Russell Bowie (1880–1959), Canadian ice hockey player
- Russell Bowles (1907–1991), American jazz trombonist
- Russell Boyd (born 1944), Australian cinematographer
- Russell Braddon (1921–1995), Australian writer of novels, biographies, and TV scripts
- Russell Bradley (born 1966), English former footballer
- Russell Brain, 1st Baron Brain (1895–1966), British neurologist
- Russell Brand (born 1975), English comedian, actor, podcaster, television presenter, and media personality
- Russell Branyan (born 1975), American former MLB player
- Russell Braun (born 1965), Canadian singer and conductor
- Russell Breslow, American actor
- Russell Brice (born 1952), New Zealand mountaineer
- Russell Broadbent (born 1950), Australian politician
- Russell Brockbank (1913–1979), Canadian-born British cartoonist
- Russell Brock, Baron Brock (1903–1980), English chest- and heart surgeon
- Russell Brock (volleyball), American college volleyball coach
- Russell Brockfeld (1926-2014), American politician from Missouri
- Russell Bromage (born 1959), English former footballer
- Russell Brookes (1945–2019), English rally driver
- Russell Brothers (born 1937), American businessman
- Russell Brower, American music composer
- Russell Brown, several people
- Russell Bruce (1918–2009), Scottish international rugby union player, and British Army officer during World War II
- Russell Bryan (born 1981), English former cricketer and current police officer
- Russell Buchanan (1900–2006), American Navy soldier during World War I and World War II
- Russell Budd, American trial lawyer
- Russell Bufalino (1903–1994), Italian-American mobster
- Russell Bulgin (1958–2002), British automotive journalist
- Russell Bussian (born 1973), Australian-born French former professional rugby league footballer
- Russell Butler (born 1968), Australian former diver
- Russell Byrd (born 1992), American professional basketball player
- Russell C. Eberhart, American electrical engineer and professor of electrical and computer engineering
- Russell C. Elliott (1842–1898), American Civil War Union soldier
- Russell C. Falconer (1851–1936), American politician
- Russell C. Harrington (1890–1971), American accountant
- Russell C. Jordan Jr. (1926–2012), American politician
- Russell C. Newhouse (1906–1998), American aviator and engineer
- Russell C. Ostrander (1851–1919), American jurist
- Russell Cake (born 1973), English former cricketer
- Russell Calvert (1909–2011), New Zealand politician and mayor
- Russell Camilleri (1936–2023), American wrestler
- Russell Campbell (born 1957), Australian former VFL player
- Russell Canouse (born 1995), American MLS player
- Russell Carollo (1955–2018), American journalist and special projects reporter
- Russell Carpenter (born 1950), American cinematographer and photographer
- Russell Carr, British car designer
- Russell Carson (born 1943), American businessman; co-founder of private equity firm Welsh, Carson, Anderson & Stowe
- Russell Carter, several people
- Russell Carver (born 1934), English former rower
- Russell Catley (1973–2020), English cricketer
- Russell Causley, British murderer
- Russell Cecchini, Canadian Paralympic swimmer
- Russell Charles McDonough (1924–2018), American Supreme Court justice
- Russell Chatham (1939–2019), American contemporary landscape artist and author
- Russell Cheney (1881–1945), American impressionist-, post-impressionist-, and New England regionalist painter
- Russell Cheung (born 1977), Hong Kong actor
- Russell Christopher (1930–2014), American operatic singer
- Russell Church (1930–2021), American psychologist
- Russell Churney (1964–2007), English composer, pianist, arranger, and musical director; member of comedy/cabaret group Fascinating Aïda
- Russell Cicerone (born 1994), American USLC player
- Russell Ciochon (born 1948), American paleoanthropologist
- Russell Clark, several people
- Russell Clarke (1876–1954), Australian politician
- Russell Claydon (born 1965), English professional golfer
- Russell Cline (born c. 1965), American currency trader
- Russell Cobb (born 1961), English former cricketer
- Russell Coffey (1898–2007), American World War I Army veteran
- Russell Coker, Australian computer programmer
- Russell Colcott (born 1949), Australian former VFL player
- Russell Coleman (born 1976), American attorney and politician
- Russell Coleman, Australian past member of rock band AC/DC
- Russell Colley (1897–1996), American mechanical engineer
- Russell Collins (1897–1965), American actor
- Russell Conwell (1843–1925), American Baptist minister, orator, philanthropist, author, lawyer, and writer; founder of Temple University
- Russell Cook, several people
- Russell Coope (1930–2011), British Quaternary paleoentomologist, neontologist, paleoclimatologist, and professor
- Russell Cooper (disambiguation), several people
- Russell Copeland (born 1971), American former NFL- and CFL player
- Russell Copeman (born 1960), Canadian politician
- Russell Cornell Leffingwell (1878–1960), American banker
- Russell Cotton (1960–2019), English footballer
- Russell Coughlin (1960–2016), Welsh professional footballer
- Russell Courtier, American gang member and murderer
- Russell Coutts (born 1962), New Zealand sailor
- Russell Cowles (1887–1979), American artist
- Russell Cowley (born 1983), Canadian-born English NHL-, NIHL-, and EIHL player
- Russell Cox, several people
- Russell Cromarty (born 1947), Australian former VFL player
- Russell Cropanzano, American management scholar, scientist, and professor of organizational behavior
- Russell Cross (born 1961), American former NBA- and CBA player
- Russell Crossley (1927–2018), English footballer
- Russell Crotty (born 1956), American artist
- Russell Crow (footballer) (born 1941), Australian former VFL player
- Russell Crowe (born 1964), New Zealand-born Australian actor and film director
- Russell Cuddihey (born 1939), English professional footballer
- Russell Cunningham, several people
- Russell Currier (born 1987), American biathlete
- Russell Curry (born 1956), American actor
- Russell D. Hale (1944–2014), American Air Force civilian
- Russell D. Hemenway (1925–2014), American political activist
- Russell D. Niles (1902–1992), American lawyer and dean
- Russell D. Oliver (1910–1974), American athlete and coach
- Russell Darbyshire (1880–1948), English Anglican bishop
- Russell DaShiell (born 1947), American guitarist
- Russell Daugherity (1902–1971), American NFL player-coach
- Russell Dauterman, American comic book illustrator
- Russell Davenport (1899–1954), American editor, political consultant, and writer
- Russell Davis (disambiguation), several people
- Russell Deacon (born 1966), Welsh historian and author
- Russell Dean Pees (born 1949), American NFL coach
- Russell Defreitas, Guyanese-born American suspect in the 2007 John F. Kennedy International Airport attack plot
- Russell DeGrazier (born 1967), American writer, director, producer, and actor
- Russell de Gree Flagg (1892–ca. 1980), American luthier
- Russell Dermond (1936–2015), American sprint canoer
- Russell Detwiler (?–1969), American artist; former husband of singer and actress Lotte Lenya
- Russell Deyo, American lawyer and government official
- Russell Dickerson (born 1987), American country pop singer-songwriter
- Russell Dickson, several people
- Russell Dingwall (born 1997), Scottish professional footballer
- Russell Dismont (1913–2005), Bermudian politician
- Russell Dive (born 1966), New Zealand chess player
- Russell Dlamini (born 1973), Liswati politician
- Russell Doane (born 1986), American professional mixed martial artist
- Russell Docker (born 1967), British Paralympic skier
- Russell Doern (1935–1987), Canadian politician
- Russell Doig (born 1964), Scottish former footballer
- Russell Domingo (born 1974), South African cricket coach
- Russell Donald (1898–1932), Scottish international rugby union player
- Russell Donaldson (born 1951), Australian former VFL player
- Russell Doolittle (1931–2019), American biochemist
- Russell Doubleday (1872–1949), American writer, editor, and publisher
- Russell Doughten (1927–2013), American filmmaker, producer, and writer
- Russell Dove (1928–2016), Australian sports shooter
- Russell Downing (born 1978), English former professional cyclist
- Russell Drysdale (1912–1981), Australian painter
- Russell Duance, Australian diesel mechanic; contestant on Married at First Sight (Australian TV series) season 8
- Russell Dumais, American politician
- Russell Dumas (1887–1975), Australian public servant and engineer
- Russell Dumas (choreographer) (born 1946), Australian dancer, choreographer, and writer
- Russell Duncan (born 1980), Scottish professional footballer
- Russell Duncan (professor), Danish historian and professor
- Russell Dunlop (1945–2009), Australian musician, singer-songwriter, and record producer-engineer
- Russell Dupuis (born 1947), American electrical engineer and physicist
- Russell Dykstra (born 1966), Australian actor of screen, stage, and television
- Russell E. Dickenson (1923–2008), American landscape architect
- Russell E. Dougherty (1920–2007), American Air Force pilot during World War II
- Russell E. Dunham (1920–2009), American World War II veteran
- Russell E. Hart (1872–1955), American architect
- Russell E. Havenstrite (1896–1958), American wildcatter and polo player
- Russell E. Train (1920–2012), American Army officer, politician, and judge
- Russell E. Tucker (born 1943), American politician
- Russell Earl (disambiguation), several people
- Russell Earnshaw (born 1975), English rugby union coach and former player
- Russell Ebert (1949–2021), Australian VFL player and coach
- Russell Eddie (born 1938), American farmer and former politician
- Russell Edmonds (born 1977), English former cricketer
- Russell Edson (1928–2014), American poet, novelist, writer, and illustrator
- Russell Edwards, American candidate in the 2010 United States House of Representatives elections in Georgia
- Russell Edwards (footballer) (born 1973), English former footballer
- Russell Elcock (born 1993), Barbadian semi-professional road cyclist
- Russell Elevado (born 1966), Filipino-born American recording engineer and record producer
- Russell Ellen (born 1954), Australian former VFL- and WAFL player
- Russell Ellice (1799–1873), British businessman
- Russell Ellington (1938–2007), American basketball player and coach
- Russell Ellis (1912–1988), South Australian Modernist architect
- Russell Ellwood, American criminal
- Russell Elrod (1904–1985), American lawyer and politician
- Russell Emanuel, English entrepreneur, musician, and producer
- Russell Endean (1924–2003), South African cricketer
- Russell England (1899–1970), British-born civil servant, farmer, politician, and murder victim
- Russell Epstein, American professor of psychology
- Russell Errett (1817–1891), American politician
- Russell Erxleben (born 1957), American former NFL player and investor
- Russell Eugene Weston Jr. (born 1956), American perpetrator of the 1998 United States Capitol shooting
- Russell Evans, several people
- Russell Everitt (1881–1973), English cricketer
- Russell F. Hicks (1820–1869), American lawyer and politician
- Russell F. Johannes (1921–1976), American agricultural scientist
- Russell Fagg (born 1960), American attorney, former judge, and politician
- Russell Faibisch (born 1977), American music festival producer and concert promoter
- Russell Fairbrother, New Zealand lawyer and former politician
- Russell Fairfax (born 1952), Australian former rugby union- and rugby league player
- Russell Fairgrieve (1924–1999), Scottish politician
- Russell Feingold (born 1953), American lawyer and politician
- Russell Fensham (born 1957), South African cricketer and field hockey player
- Russell Ferguson, American Krump dancer
- Russell Fernald, American neuroscientist/neuroethologist
- Russell Ferrante, American member of jazz fusion band Yellowjackets (band)
- Russell Field, Australian politician and anti-crime advocate
- Russell Fincher, American founder of game studio Sickhead Games
- Russell Findlay (born 1972/1973), Scottish politician and journalist
- Russell Findlay (businessman) (born 1965), American businessman, philanthropist, and advertising- and marketing executive
- Russell Flower (born 1942), English former cricketer
- Russell Floyd (born 1962), English actor
- Russell Ford (born 1983), Australian former field hockey player
- Russell Foskett (1917–1944), Australian aviator and flying ace during World War II
- Russell Foster (born 1959), British professor of sleep
- Russell Fox (1920–2013), Australian author, educator, jurist, and chief judge
- Russell Francis Wright (1920–2012), Australian radio engineer and soldier
- Russell Fraser (1934–2024), Canadian politician
- Russell Frederick Bretherton (1906–1991), English economist, civil servant, and entomologist
- Russell Freeburg (born 1923), American journalist, former managing editor, and co-author
- Russell Freedman (1929–2018), American biographer and the author
- Russell Freeman, several people
- Russell Friedenberg, American director and screenwriter; husband of producer, director, and actress Heather Rae
- Russell Froelich (1890–1958), American photographer
- Russell Fry (born 1985), American politician and lawyer
- Russell Fry (footballer) (born 1985), English footballer
- Russell Fuller, British sports broadcaster
- Russell G. Cleary (1933–1997), American brewer, lawyer, and businessman
- Russell G. Dunmore (1884–1935), American lawyer and politician
- Russell G. Juriansz (born 1946), Canadian jurist
- Russell Gage (born 1996), American NFL player
- Russell Games Slayter (1896–1964), American engineer and inventor
- Russell Gammon (1906–1968), Canadian rower
- Russell Garcia, several people
- Russell Gary (1959–2019), American NFL player
- Russell Gaskamp (born c. 1976), American football coach
- Russell Gay (c. 1916–?), British glamour photographer
- Russell Geoffrey Banks, British actor and screenwriter
- Russell George, several people
- Russell Gerry Crook (1869–1955), American sculptor and craftsman
- Russell Gewirtz (born 1967), American screenwriter
- Russell Gibson (c. 1903–1935), American bank robber
- Russell Gilbert (born 1959), Australian comedian
- Russell Gilbrook (born 1964), English musician; drummer for British rock band Uriah Heep (band)
- Russell Ginns, American game designer, writer, and composer
- Russell Glasser, American software engineer; former host on televised webcast The Atheist Experience
- Russell Gleason (1908–1945), American actor
- Russell Gold (born 1971), American author and journalist
- Russell Goldsmith, American attorney, businessman, and banker
- Russell Gomer, Welsh actor
- Russell Gómez (born 1987), Spanish former Grand Prix motorcycle racer
- Russell Goodrick (1948–2021), Australian politician and newsreader
- Russell Goodway (born 1955), Welsh politician and former mayor
- Russell Goodwin (born 1982), American pastor and politician
- Russell Gooley, Western Australian contestant on The X Factor (Australian TV series) season 1
- Russell Gordon Goreleigh (1902–1986), American painter, printmaker, and arts educator
- Russell Gould, American financier
- Russell Goward (1935–2007), American real estate broker, math teacher, and politician
- Russell Grant (born 1951), British astrologer, writer, and television- and media personality
- Russell Gray, New Zealand evolutionary biologist and psychologist
- Russell Green, several people
- Russell Greene (born 1957), Australian former VFL player
- Russell Greiner, Canadian professor of computing science
- Russell Griffiths (born 1996), English footballer
- Russell Griffiths (cricketer) (1909–?), Barbadian cricketer
- Russell Grigg (philosopher), Australian philosopher and psychoanalyst
- Russell Grimwade (1879–1955), Australian chemist, botanist, industrialist, and philanthropist
- Russell Guest, Canadian candidate in the Natural Law Party of Canada candidates in the 1997 Canadian federal election
- Russell Gunn (born 1971), American contemporary jazz trumpeter
- Russell Gurney (1804–1878), English lawyer and politician
- Russell Gurney (British Army officer) (1890–1947), British Army officer in World War I and World War II
- Russell H. Dilday (1930–2023), American pastor, educator, seminary president, and chancellor
- Russell H. Fazio (born 1952), American professor of social psychology
- Russell H. Greenan (1925–2023), American author
- Russell H. Nevins (1785–1854), American banker
- Russell H. Strange Jr., American politician
- Russell H. Tandy (1891–1963), American illustrator
- Russell H. Varian (1898–1959), American co-inventor of the klystron; co-founder of company Varian Associates
- Russell Hagg (1938–2022), Australian designer and director
- Russell Hairston (born 1964), American former NFL- and AFL player
- Russell Haley (1934–2016), English-born New Zealand poet, short story writer, and novelist
- Russell Halley (1862–1909), Scottish-born New Zealand cricketer
- Russell Hamer (1947–2024), Sri Lankan cricketer
- Russell Hamilton, several people
- Russell Hansbrough (born 1993), American former NFL player
- Russell Hantz (born 1972), American oil company owner, television personality, and contestant on Survivor
- Russell Hardie (1904–1973), American film actor
- Russell Hardin (1940–2017), American political scientist
- Russell Hardy, British businessman
- Russell Harlan (1903–1974), American cinematographer
- Russell Harlow, American clarinetist
- Russell Harmer (1896–1940), British Olympic sailor
- Russell Harrison, several people
- Russell Harty (1934–1988), English television presenter and talk show host
- Russell Harvard (born 1981), American actor
- Russell Hastings Millward (1877–1958), American inventor, author, photographer, and explorer
- Russell Haswell (born 1970), English multidisciplinary artist
- Russell Hayden (1912–1981), American film- and television actor
- Russell Headlee (1907–1987), American politician
- Russell Heap (born 1968), English former cricketer
- Russell Heath, American politician
- Russell Hellman (1917–2004), American politician
- Russell Henderson (disambiguation), several people
- Russell Hendry (born 1939), New Zealand former cricketer
- Russell Henley (born 1989), American professional golfer
- Russell Henry Chittenden (1856–1943), American physiological chemist
- Russell Hicks (1895–1957), American film character actor
- Russell Higgins, Australian former senior public servant and policymaker
- Russell Hill, several people
- Russell Hinder (born 1979), Australian former NBL player
- Russell Hitchcock (born 1949), Australian musician; lead vocalist of soft rock duo Air Supply
- Russell Hittinger (born 1949), American Roman Catholic academic, writer, and philosopher
- Russell Hoban (1925–2011), American writer
- Russell Hobby, several people
- Russell Hodgkinson (born 1959), American actor
- Russell Hogg (1968–2012), Scottish badminton player
- Russell Holland (born 1983), Australian Grand Prix motorcycle racer
- Russell Holmes (born 1969), American politician
- Russell Holmes (volleyball) (born 1982), American former professional volleyball player
- Russell Honey (1921–2007), Canadian politician and lawyer
- Russell Hookway (born 1962), Australian former representative rower and coach
- Russell Hoopingarner (1892–1964), American politician
- Russell Hopton (1900–1945), American film actor and director
- Russell Hornsby (born 1969), American actor
- Russell Hortin (born 1940), New Zealand cricketer
- Russell Hoult (born 1972), English football coach and former professional footballer
- Russell Howard (disambiguation), several people
- Russell Howarth (born 1982), English former professional footballer
- Russell Howland (1908–1995), American music educator
- Russell Hughes, several people
- Russell Hulse (footballer), Belizean-born American soccer player
- Russell Hunter (1925–2004), Scottish television-, stage-, and film actor
- Russell Hunter, English past member of proto-punk rock band Pink Fairies
- Russell Hunter (playwright) (1929–1996), American writer, playwright, and composer
- Russell Hunt Fifield (1914–2003), American political scientist, writer, and professor of political science
- Russell Hunting (1864–1943), American comic entertainer and pioneer sound recordist
- Russell Huntley (1807–?), American city founder
- Russell Hurlburt (born 1945), American professor of psychology
- Russell Hutchison (born 1978), American soccer player
- Russell Impagliazzo, American mathematician and professor of computer science
- Russell Ingall (born 1964), English-born Australian former V8 Supercar driver
- Russell Inglis (1936–1982), English cricketer
- Russell Irving (born 1964), English former professional footballer
- Russell J. Anarde (born 1950), American Air Force brigadier general
- Russell J. Boyd (born 1945), Canadian computational- and theoretical chemist, and professor emeritus
- Russell J. Bruemmer, American lawyer
- Russell J. Donnelly (1930–2015), Canadian-American physicist
- Russell J. Hemley (born 1954), American geophysicist, solid-state physicist, and physical chemist
- Russell J. Massaro, American Marine Corps officer during World War II
- Russell J. Oakes (c. 1909–1952), Australian writer of short stories and plays
- Russell J. Rickford (born c. 1975), Guyanese-born American scholar, activist, and professor
- Russell J. Waters (1843–1911), American teacher, lawyer, businessman, author, and politician
- Russell J. Weintraub (1929–2012), American lawyer and professor
- Russell J. York (1921–2006), American Army soldier during World War II
- Russell Jack (born 1935), Australian founder of the Golden Dragon Museum
- Russell Jackson, several people
- Russell Jacobus (1944–2023), American Episcopal bishop
- Russell Jacoby (born 1945), American academic and professor of history
- Russell Jacquet (1917–1990), American trumpeter
- Russell James (born 1962), Western Australian fashion-, celebrity-, and beauty photographer
- Russell James Vitale, real name of Russ (rapper) (born 1992), American independent rapper, singer, songwriter, record producer, author, and actor
- Russell Janney (1884–1963), American theatrical producer and author
- Russell Jan Pinney (born 1946), American businessman, author, speaker, and consultant
- Russell Janzen, American former ballet dancer
- Russell Javors (born 1952), American rock guitarist
- Russell Jeffrey (born 1966), Australian former VFL- and AFL player
- Russell Jennings (1955–2021), American politician
- Russell Jessop (1957–2018), Australian VFL player
- Russell Jeung, American sociologist
- Russell Johnson (disambiguation), several people
- Russell Johnston (disambiguation), several people
- Russell Jolly (born 1955), American politician
- Russell Jones, several people
- Russell Joseph Dermond (1925–2014), American murder victim
- Russell Jump (1895–2000), American mayor
- Russell K. Haight Jr. (1922–2006), American Army Air Force sergeant during World War II
- Russell K. Hotzler, American academic administrator
- Russell K. Osgood, American lawyer, legal scholar, and former professor and dean
- Russell Kane (born 1975), English writer, comedian, and actor
- Russell Keable, British educator, composer, and conductor
- Russell Kean (born 1951), New Zealand cricketer
- Russell Keanini, American mechanical engineer, mathematician, physicist, academic, and professor
- Russell Keat, British political theorist and academic and professor
- Russell Keays (1913–1995), Canadian industrialist, politician, and mayor
- Russell Keiller, Scottish curler and curling coach
- Russell Keller Laros (1895–1955), American industrialist, innovator, and philanthropist
- Russell Kelly (footballer) (born 1976), Northern Irish former footballer
- Russell Kendrick (born 1961), American Anglican bishop
- Russell Kennedy (born 1991), Canadian cross-country skier
- Russell Kerr (1921–1983), Australian-born English politician
- Russell Kerr (choreographer) (1930–2022), New Zealand ballet dancer, choreographer, and producer
- Russell Kiefel (1951–2016), Australian stage-, film-, and television actor
- Russell Kimball (1903–1979), American art director
- Russell King, several people
- Russell Kirk (1918–1994), American political philosopher, moralist, historian, social critic, literary critic, author, and novelist
- Russell Kirkpatrick (born 1961), New Zealand novelist, geography lecturer, mapmaker, and photographer
- Russell Kirsch (1929–2020), American engineer
- Russell Klika (born 1960), American photojournalist and combat photographer
- Russell Knipp (1942–2006), American weightlifter
- Russell Knox (born 1985), Scottish professional golfer
- Russell Koehler (born 1959), Australian former AFL player
- Russell Kook II, American chef; contestant on Hell's Kitchen (American TV series) season 8
- Russell Kowalyshyn (1918–1988), American politician
- Russell Kulsrud (born 1928), American physicist
- Russell Kun (born 1966), Nauruan politician, lawyer, and former powerlifter
- Russell L. Ackoff (1919–2009), American organizational theorist, consultant, and professor emeritus of management science
- Russell L. Blaisdell (1910–2007), American Air Force chaplain colonel and minister
- Russell L. Caldwell (1904–1979), American historian, educator, and community activist
- Russell L. De Valois (1926–2003), American scientist
- Russell L. "Ginger" Coote (1899–1970), Canadian bush pilot during World War I; owner of Ginger Coote Airways
- Russell L. Mack, American Air Force lieutenant general
- Russell L. Mixter (1906–2007), American scientist
- Russell L. Post Jr. (1937–2015), American politician
- Russell L. Rogers (1928–1967), American Air Force officer, electrical engineer, test pilot, and astronaut
- Russell L. Vittrup (1906–1992), American Army lieutenant general
- Russell LaFayette Cecil (1881–1965), American physician
- Russell La Forte (born 1960), British senior Royal Air Force officer
- Russell LaMarca (1928–2001), American politician
- Russell Lambert Boyle (1880–1915), Canadian rancher and soldier
- Russell Lande (born 1951), American evolutionary biologist, ecologist, and professor
- Russell Lane (born 1973), English cricketer
- Russell Lant Carpenter (1816–1892), English Unitarian minister
- Russell Latapy (born 1968), Trinidadian former professional footballer
- Russell Lee, several people
- Russell Leetch (born 1982), English bass guitarist; member of indie rock band Editors (band)
- Russell Leonce (born 1978), Trinidad and Tobago Christian music singer-songwriter
- Russell Leong (born 1950), American academic editor, professor, writer, and Chen-style tai chi student
- Russell Letterman (1933–1990), American politician
- Russell Lewis (disambiguation), several people
- Russell Lieblich (1953–2005), American game designer, programmer, and musician
- Russell Lindsay Barrett (born 1977), Australian botanist
- Russell Linwood Thomas, birth name of Sayyd Abdul Al-Khabyyr (1935–2017), American Canadian saxophonist, clarinetist, flautist, and composer
- Russell Lissack (born 1981), English guitarist; member of rock band Bloc Party
- Russell Lloyd, several people
- Russell Lord (born 1977), American writer and curator
- Russell Louder, Canadian musician and performance artist
- Russell Lutz (born 1968), American science fiction author
- Russell Lynes (1910–1991), American art historian, photographer, author, and managing editor
- Russell Lyons (born 1957), American mathematician
- Russell M. Carneal (1918–1998), American politician and judge
- Russell M. Coryell (1891–1941), American teacher, writer, and author of romance serials
- Russell M. Little (1809–1891), American politician
- Russell M. Nigro (born 1946), American former Supreme Court justice
- Russell M. Robinson II (born 1932), American lawyer and legal writer
- Russell M. Saunders (1919–2001), Canadian stunt man and acrobat
- Russell MacEwan (1925–2008), Canadian barrister and solicitor
- Russell Mack (1892–1972), American vaudeville performer
- Russell MacKinnon, Canadian politician
- Russell MacLellan (born 1940), Canadian politician
- Russell MacNeil (1931–2018), Canadian politician
- Russell Madden, several people
- Russell Mael (born 1948), American rock singer; member of pop and rock duo Sparks (band)
- Russell Maliphant (born 1961), Canadian-born English choreographer
- Russell Malmgren (1905–1982), American sound engineer
- Russell Malone (1963–2024), American jazz guitarist
- Russell Manners, several people
- Russell Manning (born 1945), Australian former international rugby union player
- Russell Marcus, American philosopher of mathematics
- Russell Mardell (born 1975), English playwright, scriptwriter, and filmmaker
- Russell Mark (born 1964), Australian Olympic marksman and clay target shooting coach
- Russell Mark Tanner (born 1977), American volleyball player
- Russell Maroon Shoatz (1943–2021), American political activist, writer, and convicted murderer
- Russell Marshall (1936–2025), New Zealand politician and diplomat
- Russell Martin, several people
- Russell Martingell (fl. 1826–1863), English cricketer
- Russell Maryland (born 1969), American former NFL player
- Russell Matheson (born 1958), Australian former politician
- Russell Matthews (1896–1987), New Zealand civil engineer, roading contractor, businessman, horticulturist, and philanthropist
- Russell Douglas Matthews, Texan organized crime figure
- Russell Maughan (1893–1958), American Army officer and pioneer aviator during World War I and World War II
- Russell Mawby (1928–2017), American academic and philanthropist
- Russell Mawhinney (born 1960), New Zealand lawyer and former cricketer
- Russell Maxwell (1890–1968), American Army officer
- Russell McCarthy (rugby league) (1929–2008), Australian rugby league footballer
- Russell McConnell (1918–1942), Canadian athlete and soldier
- Russell McCormmach (born 1933), American historian of physics
- Russell McCrimmon (1890–1934), Canadian professional ice hockey player
- Russell McDonald (1913–1980), Australian politician
- Russell McHenry (born 1950), Australian former VFL player
- Russell McInnes (1912–1991), Australian VFL player
- Russell McPhedran (1936–2018), Australian photographer
- Russell McVinney (1898–1971), American Roman Catholic prelate
- Russell Means (1939–2012), Oglala Lakota activist
- Russell Mehta, Indian businessman
- Russell Meiggs (1902–1989), British ancient historian
- Russell Menard (1942–2023), American university emeritus professor of economic and social history of the British colonies in North America
- Russell Merle Genet (born 1940), American astronomer
- Russell Merriman (born 1968), Australian former AFL player
- Russell Merrin (born 1945), New Zealand former cricketer
- Russell Mervyn Murray (1877–1945), Australian metallurgist and mine manager
- Russell Metty (1906–1978), American cinematographer
- Russell Meyer (born 1972), New Zealand former international lawn bowler
- Russell Middlemiss (1929–2019), Australian VFL player
- Russell Miller (disambiguation), several people
- Russell Mills, several people
- Russell Milton (born 1969), English former professional footballer
- Russell Mirasty (born 1956/1957), Canadian former lieutenant governor
- Russell Mitchell, several people
- Russell Mittermeier (born 1949), American primatologist and herpetologist
- Russell Mock, American judge
- Russell Mockridge (1928–1958), Australian racing cyclist
- Russell Moore, several people
- Russell Morash (1936–2024), American public television producer and director
- Russell Moreland (1901–1986), Scottish footballer
- Russell Morris (disambiguation), several people
- Russell Morrison (?–2013), Australian Paralympic swimmer
- Russell Morse Wilder (1885–1959), American physician, diabetologist, epileptologist, and medical researcher
- Russell Mortimer Luckock (1877–1950), British Army officer during World War I
- Russell Moses (born 1948), New Zealand artist
- Russell Mount (1797–1834), Canadian surveyor and political figure
- Russell Muir (born 1954), Australian former VFL player
- Russell Muirhead (born 1965), American academic, politician, and author
- Russell Mulcahy (born 1953), Australian director of film, television, and music videos
- Russell Mullen (1924–2019), American politician
- Russell Mullins (1952–2025), Australian NSWRL player
- Russell Musker (born 1962), English former footballer and manager
- Russell Mwafulirwa (born 1983), Malawian former footballer
- Russell Myers (born 1938), American cartoonist
- Russell N. Jordahl (1903–1988), American Marine Corps brigadier general
- Russell Nant (born 1952), New Zealand road- and track cyclist
- Russell Napier (1910–1974), Australian actor
- Russell Nelson (disambiguation), several people
- Russell Nesbit (c. 1920–2001), American acrobat, coach, and art model
- Russell Newcombe (1957–2024), British substance use researcher
- Russell Noftsker (born 1942), American entrepreneur; founder of computer company Symbolics
- Russell Norman (1965–2023), English restaurateur, chef, teacher, and author
- Russell Northe (born 1966), Australian former politician, footballer, and football coach
- Russell Nype (1920–2018), American actor and singer
- Russell O. Hickman (1908–1988), American politician and businessman
- Russell O. Morrow (1907–1984), American politician
- Russell Oatman (1905–1964), Canadian PCHA-, WHL-, and NHL player
- Russell Ober (born 1938), American politician
- Russell Oberlin (1928–2016), American singer and founding member of ensemble New York Pro Musica
- Russell Ohl (1898–1987), American scientist
- Russell Ohlsen (born 1955), Australian former VFL player
- Russell Okung (born 1988), American former NFL player
- Russell Olson (1924–2010), American farmer and politician
- Russell Ong, Singaporean swimmer
- Russell Ormond Redman (born 1951), Canadian astronomer and specialist in radio astronomy
- Russell Osborne, American football coach
- Russell Osman (born 1959), English former professional footballer
- Russell Ott (born 1978), American lobbyist and politician
- Russell Owen (1889–1952), American journalist
- Russell P. Hartle (1889–1961), American senior Army officer who fought in World War I and World War II
- Russell P. Hughes (born 1946), American/British chemist and professor emeritus of chemistry
- Russell Packer (born 1989), New Zealand former professional rugby league footballer
- Russell Paddock (born 1966), Canadian volleyball player and university athletic director
- Russell Page (1906–1985), English gardener, garden designer, and landscape architect
- Russell Page (dancer) (1968–2002), Indigenous Australian dancer; past member of dance company Bangarra Dance Theatre
- Russell Pancoast (1899–1972), American architect and city planner
- Russell Parrish, real name of Satchel (musician) (born 1970), American musician; member of comedic glam metal band Steel Panther, and past member of heavy metal band Fight (band)
- Russell Pascoe (1940–1963), British man who was hanged for murder
- Russell Patterson (1893–1977), American cartoonist, illustrator, and scenic designer
- Russell Patterson (singer) (born 1954), American singer, songwriter, recording artist, record producer, and actor; member of R&B group Black Ivory
- Russell Paulley (1909–1984), Canadian politician
- Russell Paulson (1897–1980), American farmer and politician
- Russell Payne, several people
- Russell Pearce (1947–2023), American politician
- Russell Peck (1945–2009), American composer
- Russell Peck (scholar) (1933–2023), American medievalist, scholar of medieval literature, and author
- Russell Penn (born 1985), English former professional footballer
- Russell Pepperell (1918–2003), English professional rugby league footballer, rugby union footballer, and coach
- Russell Perrett (born 1973), English former footballer
- Russell Perry, several people
- Russell "Pete" Ashbaugh (1921–2009), American college football player
- Russell Peters (born 1970), Canadian stand-up comedian, actor, and producer
- Russell Pettigrew (1920–2015), New Zealand businessman and philanthropist
- Russell Phegan (born 1947), Australian former swimmer
- Russell Phillips (1969–1995), American NASCAR driver
- Russell Phillips (ice hockey) (1888–1949), Canadian ice hockey player
- Russell Pierson (1911–2015), American farm broadcasting pioneer
- Russell Pinkston (born 1949), American professor of composition and electronic music director
- Russell Pitzer, several people
- Russell Pockett, English radio presenter
- Russell Poldrack (born 1967), American psychologist, neuroscientist, and professor
- Russell Pollard (born 1975), American rock musician
- Russell Poole (1956–2015), American police officer, private investigator, and author
- Russell Porter, several people
- Russell Potter (born 1960), American writer, college professor, and guitarist
- Russell Powell (baseball) (1893–?), American Negro league baseball player
- Russell Prescott (born 1960), American businessman and politician
- Russell Pritchard, English past member of indie rock band The Zutons
- Russell Procope (1908–1981), American clarinetist and alto saxophonist
- Russell Pysklywec (born 1970), Canadian professor of geology
- Russell Rea (1846–1916), English ship-owner and politician
- Russell Redding, American politician
- Russell Redenbaugh (born 1945), American investor, speaker, and author
- Russell Reeder (1902–1998), American Army officer and writer
- Russell Reeve (1895–1970), British painter
- Russell Reid, British consultant psychiatrist
- Russell Reinke (1921–2004), Canadian businessman and politician
- Russell Remington, American past member of musical group Giant Country Horns
- Russell Renfrey (1923–2018), Australian VFL player
- Russell Reyes, Filipino past member of boy band BoybandPH
- Russell Reynolds (born 1951), Australian former WAFL- and VFL player
- Russell Richards (born 1962), Australian former VFL player
- Russell Richardson (born 1977), Australian former professional rugby league footballer
- Russell Ridgway (1891–1946), English-born Rhodesian businessman
- Russell Robartes (1671–1719), English politician
- Russell Robertson (born 1978), Australian former professional footballer
- Russell Robins (1932–2019), Welsh rugby union- and professional rugby league footballer
- Russell Robinson (born 1986), American NBL player
- Russell Robinson (triple jumper) (born 2001), American triple jumper
- Russell Rook, Baron Rook, British Anglican priest, life peer, and politician
- Russell Ross (1929–1999), American professor of pathology
- Russell Rouse (1913–1987), American screenwriter, director, and producer
- Russell Rowe (1914–1994), Canadian politician
- Russell Rowe (cricketer) (born 1975), English former cricketer
- Russell Rowe (footballer) (born 1954), Australian former VFL player
- Russell Ruderman, American politician
- Russell Rulau (1926–2012), American numismatist
- Russell Rumbaugh, American defense policy advisor and former military officer
- Russell S. Berkey (1893–1985), American Navy admiral during World War II
- Russell S. Bonds, American corporate attorney and author of military history
- Russell S. Codman Jr. (1896–1992), American real estate executive
- Russell S. Drago (1928–1997), American professor of inorganic chemistry
- Russell S. Kokubun (born 1948), American politician
- Russell S. Taft (1835–1902), American lawyer, politician, and Supreme Court judge
- Russell S. Winer, American econometrician, academic administrator, and professor of marketing
- Russell Sage (1816–1906), American financier, railroad executive, and politician
- Russell Sansom (born 1956), South African cricketer
- Russell Savage (born 1948), Australian politician
- Russell Schriefer, American political strategist and media consultant
- Russell Schuh (1941–2016), American linguist
- Russell Schultz, American former member of the militant organization Proud Boys
- Russell Schulz-Widmar (born 1944), American composer, author, and conductor; former professor of liturgical music
- Russell Scott (disambiguation), several people
- Russell Searle (1912–1964), South African cricketer
- Russell Selkirk (1905–1993), American politician
- Russell Senior (born 1961), English musician, record producer, and playwright
- Russell Sexton (born 1978), English former cricketer
- Russell Shank (1925–2012), American librarian
- Russell Shankland, Welsh murderer
- Russell Shaw, several people
- Russell Shealy (born 1999), American professional soccer player
- Russell Shearman (1908–1956), American special effects artist
- Russell Shepard (born 1990), American former NFL player
- Russell Sherman (1930–2023), American classical pianist, educator, and author
- Russell Sherwell (born 1960), Australian former water polo player
- Russell Shields (born 1962), Australian former VFL player
- Russell Short (born 1969), Australian legally blind Paralympic athlete
- Russell Shorto (born 1959), American author, historian, and journalist
- Russell Simins, American past member of three-piece rock band Jon Spencer Blues Explosion
- Russell Simmons (born 1957), American entrepreneur, writer, and record executive
- Russell Simon (born 1949), Australian Olympic basketball player
- Russell Simpson, several people
- Russell Sincock (born 1947), Australian former cricketer
- Russell Skerman (1903–1983), Australian Supreme Court judge
- Russell Skiba, American educational psychologist and professor
- Russell Slade (born 1960), English former professional football manager and coach
- Russell Smart (1858–1923), British socialist activist
- Russell Smith, several people
- Russell Soaba (born 1950), Papua New Guinean writer
- Russell Soh, Singaporean contestant on spelling game show Spell Cast
- Russell Solomon (1925–2018), American entrepreneur
- Russell Spanner (1916–1974), Canadian furniture designer
- Russell Spears (1917–2009), American stonemason and Narragansett tribal elder
- Russell Spence (born 1960), English racing driver
- Russell Spiers (born 1962), English former cricketer
- Russell Spiers (rugby league) (born 1991), English professional rugby league footballer
- Russell Springmann (born 1969), American college basketball coach
- Russell Sprong (1894–1956), American football- and basketball coach
- Russell Standish (1933–2008), Australian doctor who was a Seventh-day Adventist
- Russell Stannard (1931–2022), English professor of physics
- Russell Steagall (born 1938), American country music singer, musician, poet, and stage performer
- Russell Stewart, several people
- Russell Stokes (1903–1974), Australian politician
- Russell Stone, several people
- Russell Stover (1888–1954), American chemist, entrepreneur, and co-founder of Russell Stover Candies
- Russell Streiner (born 1940), American film producer and actor
- Russell Strong (born 1938), Australian transplant surgeon
- Russell Sturgis (1836–1909), American architect and art critic
- Russell Sturgis (1750–1826), American merchant in the China trade
- Russell Sturgis (1805–1887), American merchant in the China trade
- Russell Sturgis Hubbard (1902–1972), American Episcopal priest and bishop
- Russell Stuvaints (born 1980), American former NFL player
- Russell Sugarmon (1929–2019), American politician and judge
- Russell Sutor (1951–1995), Canadian businessman and political figure
- Russell Suzuki, American attorney
- Russell Swan, American attorney; contestant on Survivor (American TV series)
- Russell T. Gordon (1936–2013), American painter, printmaker, professor, and university faculty member
- Russell T. McCutcheon (born 1961), Canadian religion scholar
- Russell T. Osguthorpe (born 1946), American Mormon university professor and missionary
- Russell T. Rauscher (1908–1989), American Episcopal bishop
- Russell T. Thane (1926–2020), American politician
- Russell Tapp (1943–2010), British Olympic luger
- Russell Targ (born 1934), American physicist, parapsychologist, and author
- Russell Taylor, several people
- Russell Teibert (born 1992), Canadian former professional soccer player
- Russell Teig (born 1957), American politician
- Russell Temple Kelley (1877–1952), Canadian insurance broker and political figure
- Russell Thacher (c. 1919–1990), American author and film producer
- Russell Thacher Trall (1812–1877), American physician of hydrotherapy, natural hygiene, and vegetarianism
- Russell Thaw (1910–1984), American airplane pilot and childhood actor
- Russell Thomas (born 1976/1977), American operatic tenor
- Russell Thomas (politician) (1896–1957), Welsh physician, barrister, and politician
- Russell Thompkins Jr. (born 1951), American soul singer; past member of Philadelphia soul group The Stylistics
- Russell Thomson (born 1969), South African cricketer
- Russell Thorndike (1885–1972), English actor and novelist
- Russell Thornton (born 1942), Cherokee-American anthropologist and professor of anthropology
- Russell Thornton (writer), Canadian poet
- Russell Thorson (1906–1982), American actor
- Russell Tiffin (born 1959), Zimbabwean cricket umpire and former cricketer
- Russell Todd (born 1958), American film- and television actor
- Russell Tollefson (1891–1962), American NFL coach
- Russell Torrance (born 1976/1977), Scottish-born Australian broadcaster, radio producer, and musician
- Russell Tovey (born 1981), English actor, playwright, screenwriter, author, podcaster, and art collector
- Russell Trabue (1900–1988), American Negro league baseball pitcher
- Russell Tracy, American epidemiological scientist, pathologist, and professor
- Russell Travers, American national security official
- Russell Treyz (1940–2024), American regional theater director
- Russell Triplett, American college baseball coach and former player
- Russell Trood (1948–2017), Australian politician, academic, and associate professor
- Russell Tuck, English trade unionist
- Russell Tucker (born 1990), South African discus thrower
- Russell Tulloch (born 1942), Australian former VFL player
- Russell Tully (1949–2013), Australian VFL player
- Russell Turner (born 1970), American college basketball coach
- Russell Turner (politician) (born 1941), Australian politician
- Russell Tuttle (born 1939), American primate morphologist, paleoanthropologist, anthropologist, and professor
- Russell Tweeddale (born 1954), Australian former VFL player
- Russell Upcher (1844–1937), British Army officer
- Russell V. DeLong (1901–1981), American Nazarene minister, evangelist, and college president
- Russell V. Mack (1891–1960), American Army personnel of World War I, and politician
- Russell Valentine Gardner (born 1946), Uttarakhand educator
- Russell Van Gelder, American clinician-scientist and ophthalmologist
- Russell van Horn (1885–1970), American boxer
- Russell Van Hout (born 1976), Australian former racing cyclist
- Russell van Wyk (born 1990), Namibian rugby union player
- Russell Veh (born 1950), American political activist and propagandist
- Russell Vick (1892–1958), English lawyer, judge, and politician
- Russell Vincent (born 1954), Australian cricketer
- Russell Viner (born 1963), Australian-British paediatrician, policy researcher, and professor of adolescent health
- Russell Vis (1900–1990), American amateur- and professional wrestler
- Russell Vought (born 1976), American government official and political analyst
- Russell W. Belk, American business academic and research professor of marketing
- Russell W. Galbut (born 1952), American lawyer, CPA, real estate developer, and philanthropist
- Russell W. Keeney (1897–1958), American lawyer and politician
- Russell W. Kruse (1922–2007), American auctioneer
- Russell W. Meyer Jr. (born 1932), American chairman emeritus and former CEO of the Cessna Aircraft Company
- Russell W. Peterson (1916–2011), American scientist and politician
- Russell W. Volckmann (1911–1982), American Army brigadier general during World War II
- Russell Wade (1917–2006), American actor
- Russell Wainscoat (1898–1967), English footballer
- Russell Walker (1842–1922), English cricketer, barrister, and cricket administrator
- Russell Walker Houston, American politician
- Russell Walseth, real name of Sox Walseth (1926–2004), American college basketball coach
- Russell Wangersky (born 1962), Canadian journalist and writer
- Russell Ward, several people
- Russell Warren, several people
- Russell Wasendorf (born 1948), American man convicted of fraud
- Russell Waters (1908–1982), Scottish film actor
- Russell Watkinson (born 1977), English former footballer
- Russell Watson (born 1966), English singer
- Russell Watt (1935–2022), New Zealand rugby union player
- Russell Watton (born 1954), Northern Irish loyalist, politician, and community activist
- Russell Waugh (born 1941), Australian cricketer
- Russell Wayt (1942–2020), American NFL player
- Russell Webb, several people
- Russell Webber (born 1967), American politician
- Russell Weigley (1930–2004), American professor of history, and military historian
- Russell Weiner (born 1970), American billionaire businessman; founder of energy drink Rockstar Energy
- Russell Weir (1951–2022), Scottish professional golfer
- Russell Wentworth (born 1973), Australian former volleyball player
- Russell Westbrook (born 1988), American NBA player
- Russell Whelan (1914–1981), Australian VFL player
- Russell White (born 1970), American former NFL player
- Russell White (bishop) (1896–1979), English bishop
- Russell White (politician) (1895–1981), Australian politician
- Russell White (triathlete) (born 1992), Northern Irish triathlete
- Russell Whitson (1914–1996), Canadian politician
- Russell Whyte, real name of Rustie (born 1983), Scottish musician
- Russell Wiggins (actor) (born 1945), American actor
- Russell Williams (disambiguation), several people
- Russell Williamson (born 1980), English former footballer
- Russell Willson (1883–1948), American Navy flag officer and inventor
- Russell Wilson (disambiguation), several people
- Russell Winger (born 1984), American track- and field athlete
- Russell Winnicott (1898–1917), English World War I flying ace
- Russell Winter (born 1975), British professional surfer and coasteerer
- Russell Winter (rugby union) (born 1975), South African-born English former rugby union player and current coach
- Russell Withey (born 1991), Botswana cricketer
- Russell Wolfe (1964–2015), American actor and film producer
- Russell Wong (born 1963), American actor
- Russell Wood, several people
- Russell Woodruffe (born 1985), Australian footballer
- Russell Woolf (1964–2021), Australian radio personality and news presenter
- Russell Woollen (1923–1994), American keyboard artist and composer
- Russell Wortley (born 1957), Australian politician
- Russell Wyckoff (1925–2004), American politician
- Russell Wyer (born 1972), Australian former professional rugby league footballer
- Russell Yates, American former husband of convicted murderer Andrea Yates
- Russell Young, several people
- Russell Yuristy (born 1936), Canadian artist
- Russell Zavistovich (1928–2000), Polish-born American anti-communist
- Russell Zguta (born 1949), American historian, educator, and professor emeritus
- Russell Zimmer (1926–2024), American politician

== Fictional characters ==
- Russell, in the adult animated web series Happy Tree Friends, voiced by Jeff Biancalana and Francis Carr
- Russell, in the comedy science fiction franchise The Hitchhiker's Guide to the Galaxy, played by Rupert Degas
- Russell Bell, in the US crime drama TV series The Wire, played by Idris Elba
- Russell Brennan, in the Australian TV soap opera Neighbours, played by Russell Kiefel
- Russell Brown, in the Irish TV soap opera Fair City, played by Conor Delaney
- Russell Casse, in the 1996 US science fiction action film Independence Day, played by Randy Quaid
- Russell Coight, in the Australian mockumentary TV series All Aussie Adventures, played by Glenn Robbins
- Russell Edgington, in the US fantasy horror drama TV series True Blood, played by Denis O'Hare
- Russell Fabray, in the US jukebox musical comedy-drama TV series Glee, played by Gregg Henry
- Russell Feldman, in the US TV series Agents of S.H.I.E.L.D., played by Austin Basis
- Russell Fellow, in the Japanese anime Re:Zero, voiced by Chris Cason (English) and Tōru Ōkawa (Japanese)
- Russell Ferguson, in the children's animated musical TV series Littlest Pet Shop, voiced by Sam Vincent
- Russell Ford, in the US daytime TV soap opera General Hospital, played by Richard Gant
- Russell Glosson, in the US superhero TV series The Flash, played by Aaron Douglas
- Russell Harris, in the Australian TV soap opera Home and Away, played by Monroe Reimers
- Russell Morgan, in the UK children's TV drama series Grange Hill, played by Jamie Lehane
- Russell Nash, alternate name of Connor MacLeod, in the Highlander media franchise, played by Christopher Lambert
- Russell Nash, in the UK TV soap opera EastEnders, played by Ray Ashcroft
- Russell Oakes, in the 1983 US TV film The Day After, played by Jason Robards
- Russell Posner, in the UK TV soap opera Emmerdale, played by Rob Jarvis
- Russell Tavaroff, in the US superhero TV series Batwoman, played by Jesse Hutch
- Russell Taylor, in the US police procedural TV series The Closer, played by Robert Gossett
- Russell the pedestrian, in the 1840 UK chapbook style songbook The Tyne Songster (W & T Fordyce, 1840)
- Russell Thorpe, in the US teen drama TV series Gossip Girl, played by Michael Boatman
- Russell Turner, in the New Zealand prime-time soap opera Shortland Street, played by Matthew Sunderland
- Russell Tymball, in the 1942 US science fiction short story Black Friar of the Flame
- Russell Woodman, in the 2001 US science fiction comedy film Evolution, played by Ted Levine

== See also ==
- Russ (disambiguation)
- Russel (disambiguation)
- Russell (surname)
- Rush (name)
- Roussel (surname)
