= Anne Fernald =

American psychologist

- Education: University of Oregon
- Scientific career
- Thesis: Acoustic determinants of infant preference for "motherese" (1982)
- Website: psychology.stanford.edu/people/anne-fernald

Anne Fernald is an American psychologist. She serves as the Josephine Knotts Knowles Professor in Human Biology at Stanford University and has been described as "the leading researcher in infant-directed speech".

Fernald received a Ph.D. in psychology from the University of Oregon in 1982, where she studied under the mentorship of Patricia K. Kuhl. As well as her position as a psychology professor, Fernald has taken an administrative role at Stanford as vice provost for faculty development. She also serves on the advisory board for a California-based company VersaMe which focuses on early childhood education and was partially inspired by Fernald's research. Her husband, Russell Fernald, is the Benjamin Scott Crocker Professor in Human Biology at Stanford.

== Career ==
Fernald specializes in children's language development, investigating the development of speed and efficiency in children's early comprehension in relation to their emerging lexical and grammatical competence. Recently, she has also begun to study language development in bilingual Spanish-English speaking children and children who are learning Spanish in addition to English. Her research has shown that infants prefer baby talk to adult speech and that it plays an important role in their language development, and that baby talk has universal features that span multiple cultures and languages. She has also studied the effects of television on infants, showing that young TV viewers echo the emotional responses of the actors they see.

== Selected research ==
=== Socioeconomic status research ===
One of the studies Fernald focused on was the effect of socioeconomic status on language processing skills and vocabulary. Socioeconomic status in this study were based upon the education level of each parents, occupation of each parent, and income. She focused on children between the ages of eighteen months to twenty-four months. In the beginning of her study, she found that at the start the children did not seem to have a difference in skills and vocabulary, but at twenty-four months they had an approximate six-month gap. Her research contributed to the debates during the Civil rights movement, when the question was raised of if there was truly inequalities in education between Black and White schools. In her research she found that socioeconomic status does affect the way that children develop language, these factors include: childcare and amount of time spent with the child. In Fernald's research, she found that socioeconomic status does matter, but the quantity and quality of interactions with children. Fernald's research contributed to language acquisition and also helped illustrate that there are many factors that go into how a child develops their repertoire in vocabulary.

=== Effects of early language experience and acquisition ===
Anne Fernald and Adriana Weisleder produced the current study to answer the question: "Is early experience with language linked to the development of efficiency in language processing, and if so, differences in processing efficiency mediate the well established relation between early language experience and later vocabulary knowledge?" To answer these questions, Weisleder and Fernald gathered 29 Spanish-learning infants who were all typically developing according to their parents. The families that participated consisted of low-income Latino families. Fernald made audio recordings of the infants throughout the child's typical days and their interaction with their parents. The parents of were also asked to keep a log of their children which contained recordings of their interactions as well. Regarding measures of expressive vocabulary, parents collected productive vocabulary scores. Language processing efficiency was measured by presenting infants with pairs of images while hearing sentences containing one of the words. The children were also tested on child-directed speech, which is a change in tone of voice when speaking to a child the. Fernald discovered that a variety of adult-speech was found to be accessible to children in the low-income families. A main point to be aware of includes the variation between low-income Spanish speaking families and child-directed speech and its predicted effects on vocabulary. Also, learned vocabulary occurred only when speech was directed at the infant rather than in an adult conversation. These findings conclude that the efficiency of speech processing does facilitate child directed speech and its relation to vocabulary.

Fernald also studied to see if the pitch and tone in adults voices when talking to infants makes a difference when it comes to intent of the communication. Several different tests were used to determine whether or not what she was researching had any validity to it at all. The tests started out by using 80 participants, 20 mothers and 20 fathers of children between 10 and 14 months old and then 20 female and 20 male college students that had no direct experience with infants or kids past the age of 5. Fernald's tests had 5 natural samples of infant and adult directed speech recorded from mothers of 12-month-old kids in 5 standardized interactional contexts: Attention-bid, Approval, Prohibition, Comfort, and Game/telephone. They then got 25 infant directed and 25 adult directed vocalizations that were electronically filtered to eliminate linguistic content. They then had the 80 subjects listen to these content filtered speech acts and tried to identify the intent of the speaker by only using the "prosodic" information or the pitch and tone. The subjects were able to tell the intent of the infant directed speech way more frequently than that of adult directed speech. What this was able to show is that the pitch of infant directed speech is more informative than adult directed speech and this is beneficial for preverbal infants. Fernald was ultimately able to contribute more information on how the patterns of child directed speech are beneficial to children's understanding of speech intent.

One of Fernald's studies analyze how infants perceive different emotions through television. One simulation included, infants observing actors on a TV express negative and positive emotions when playing with certain toys. This study answered the question of whether a 10-12 month-old baby will emote the same reactions towards a toy as the actors seen on a televised series did and if it will dictate the same emotion towards a toy. Once the infants were done watching they were then presented with the same objects and had 30 seconds to encode and react. When the infant was presented with the toy that the actor had negative emotions towards, the infant associated the same toy with negative emotions as well and resulted in the infant disengaging. This same procedure was done again but with the toy that the actor reacted positively to and again the baby corresponded the positive emotions with the toy and reacted positively towards within the 30 seconds. This simulation proves Fernald's question to be true. She found that infants are able to interpret and encode the same emotions that are displayed on a televised screen. This is just one of the many ways an infant picks up on social-referencing. Social referencing is the process in which a child relies on social cues in a certain context to relay the correct reaction. This method efficiently examines if and how an infant encodes certain emotions towards certain objects from a stranger on television.
