= Russel =

Russel is an alternate spelling of Russell.

Russel may also refer to:

== People with the given name ==
- Russel Arnold (born 1973), Sri Lankan cricketer
- Russel Crouse (1893–1966), American playwright
- Russel Farnham (1784–1832), American frontiersman
- Russel Honoré (born 1947), American general
- Russel Mthembu (born 1947), South African singer
- Russel Mwafulirwa (born 1983), Malawian soccer player
- Russel Norman (born 1967), New Zealand politician
- Russel B. Nye (1913–1993), American professor
- Russel Walder (born 1959), American jazz musician
- Russel Ward (1914–1995), Australian historian
- Russel Wong (born 1961), Singaporean photographer
- Russel Wright (1904–1976), American industrial designer

== People with the surname ==
- Andrew Russel (1856–1934), American politician
- Rae Russel (1925–2008), American photographer
- Tony Russel (1925–2017), American actor

== People with the middle name ==
- Alfred Russel Wallace (1823–1913), British naturalist

== Fictional characters ==
- Russel Hobbs, fictional drummer character in the virtual band Gorillaz

== Places ==
- Russel Range, Canada
- Russel Creek, Virginia, USA
- Russel Tank, Arizona, USA

== Other uses ==
- Russel (grape), another name for the German wine grape Riesling
- Sheikh Russel KC, football club in Bangladesh

== See also ==
- Russell (given name)
- Rusty (disambiguation)
- Russ (disambiguation)
