= Russell Earl (disambiguation) =

Russell Earl is a visual effects supervisor. Russell Earl may also refer to:

- Russell Earl Bucklew (1968–2019), American man executed for murder
- Russell Earl Kelly, American Christian theologian, apologist, speaker, blogger, and author
- Russell Earl Marker (1902–1995), American chemist
