= Russell Freeman =

Russell Freeman may refer to:

- Russell Freeman (American football) (1969–2021), American NFL player
- Russ Freeman (pianist) (1926–2002), American jazz pianist and composer
- Russell F. Freeman (born 1939), American diplomat and attorney; former U.S. Ambassador to Belize
- Russ Freeman (guitarist) (born 1960), American jazz fusion guitarist, and composer; bandleader of The Rippingtons; Peak Records founder
- Russell Freeman, CEO of GuideIT

== See also ==
- Russell Freedman (1929–2018), American biographer
