= Russell Allen (disambiguation) =

Russell Allen (born 1971) is the singer of the American progressive metal band Symphony X.

Russell Allen may also refer to:

- Russell Allen (American football) (born 1986), American football player
- Russell Allen (footballer) (born 1954), English former footballer
- Russell Allen (cyclist) (1913–2012), American cyclist
- Russell Allen Phillips, American pilot during World War II

== See also ==
- Russell Ellen (born 1954), Australian footballer
- Allen (surname)
