= Howard Russell =

Howard Russell may refer to:

- Howard Hyde Russell (1855–1946), American prohibitionist
- Howard S. Russell (1887–1980), American gardener, writer, and politician

== See also ==
- Russell Howard (disambiguation)
