= Russell Spiers (rugby league) =

English rugby league footballer

Russ Spiers
Personal information
- Full name: Russell Spiers
- Born: 28 April 1991 (age 33)
- Height: 6 ft 0 in (182 cm)
- Weight: 16 st 1 lb (102 kg)

Playing information
- Position: Prop, Loose forward
Club
Years	Team	Pld	T	G	FG	P
2011–12	Wakefield Trinity	2	0	0	0	0
2012	→ Doncaster (loan)	19	4	0	0	16
2013–16	Doncaster	66	0	0	0	0
2013	→ Dewsbury Rams (loan)	8	0	0	0	0
2016	York City Knights	23	5	0	0	20
2017–21	Doncaster	79	15	0	0	48
2022	Midlands Hurricanes	5	0	0	0	0
	Total	202	24	0	0	84
- Source: As of 23 March 2023

Russell Spiers (born 28 April 1991) is a professional rugby league footballer who last played for the Midlands Hurricanes in Betfred League 1. He previously played in Betfred League 1 for Doncaster

He has played at club level in the Super League for the Wakefield Trinity Wildcats, and in the Rugby League Championships for Doncaster (three spells, including the first on loan), the Dewsbury Rams (loan) and the York City Knights. Spiers plays as a prop, or loose forward.

== Playing career ==
In October 2016 he re-signed for Doncaster having spent the previous season at York City Knights. After five seasons at Doncaster Spiers joined the Midlands Hurricanes for the 2022 season but retired in June 2022 after making five appearances for the Hurricanes. In August 2022 he was informed by UK Anti-Doping (UKAD) that he had failed a routine drugs test in May 2022. On 23 March 2023 Spiers was banned from the sport for three years by UKAD for illegal use of boldenone, an anabolic steroid.
