= Russell Brockfeld =

American politician (1926–2014)

Member of the U.S. House of Representatives from Missouri's 108th district

Missouri House of Representatives
- Incumbent
- Assumed office 1973

Personal details
- Born: 1926 near Truesdale, Missouri, US
- Died: 2014 (aged 87–88)
- Resting place: Warrenton City Cemetery
- Party: Republican
- Spouse: Evelyn C. Schlanker
- Children: 4 (2 sons, 2 daughters)
- Occupation: business owner

Russell Gale Brockfeld (November 6, 1926 - August 3, 2014) was an American Republican politician who served in the Missouri House of Representatives for about 20 years. He was born near Truesdale, Missouri, and was educated at Warrenton public schools and the University of Missouri-Columbia. On September 10, 1949, he married Evelyn C. Schlanker in Warrenton, Missouri. He served in the United States Army in Japan between 1946 and 1948.
