= Russell Cropanzano =

American business academic

Russell Cropanzano is an American management scholar. As of 2022, he is a professor of organizational behavior at the Leeds School of Business, University of Colorado Boulder.

== Education and career ==
Cropanzano gained a BA in psychology from Louisiana State University (1983) and an MA from Southern Methodist University (1985). His doctorate in industrial/organizational psychology is from Purdue University (1988); his dissertation is titled "A Conceptual Analysis of Organizational Plans".

He served on the faculty of the psychology department at Colorado State University (1988–2002) and of the Eller School of Management at the University of Arizona (2002–12). He has been a professor at the University of Colorado-Boulder since 2012.

== Research ==
Cropanzano's research is in the areas of emotion in the workplace, organizational justice perceptions in the workplace, worker well-being, and employee burnout.

== Selected works ==
- Cropanzano, Russell; Mitchell, Marie S. (December 2005). "Social Exchange Theory: An Interdisciplinary Review". Journal of Management. 31 (6): 874–900. doi:10.1177/0149206305279602. S2CID 146669866.
- Ambrose, Maureen L.; Cropanzano, Russell (2003). "A longitudinal analysis of organizational fairness: An examination of reactions to tenure and promotion decisions". Journal of Applied Psychology. 88 (2): 266–275. doi:10.1037/0021-9010.88.2.266. PMID 12731710.
- Schminke, Marshall; Ambrose, Maureen L.; Cropanzano, Russell S. (2000). "The effect of organizational structure on perceptions of procedural fairness". Journal of Applied Psychology. 85 (2): 294–304. doi:10.1037/0021-9010.85.2.294. PMID 10783545.
- Cropanzano, Russell; Weiss, Howard M. (1996). "Affective Events Theory: A theoretical discussion of the structure, causes and consequences of affective experiences at work". In B. M. Staw & L. L. Cummings (ed.). Research in Organizational Behavior (Vol. 18). Vol. 18. p. 1–74.
