= Russell Jackson =

Russell Jackson may refer to:

- Russ Jackson (born 1936), Canadian football player
- Russell Jackson (1890–1956), of the Jackson baronets
- Russell B Jackson, American upright and electric bass player
- Russell Jackson, in the television show Madam Secretary, the fictitious Presidential Chief of Staff, as played by Željko Ivanek
