= Russell Payne =

Russell Payne may refer to:

- Russell Payne (soccer) (born 1975), retired American soccer goalkeeper
- Russell Payne (author) (born 1971), English author
- Russell Payne (athlete) (1902–1970), American Olympic athlete
