= Russell Garcia =

Russell Garcia may refer to:

- Russell Garcia (field hockey) (born 1970), British former international field hockey player
- Russell Garcia (composer) (1916–2011), American film composer
