= Russell Gerry Crook =

American sculptor

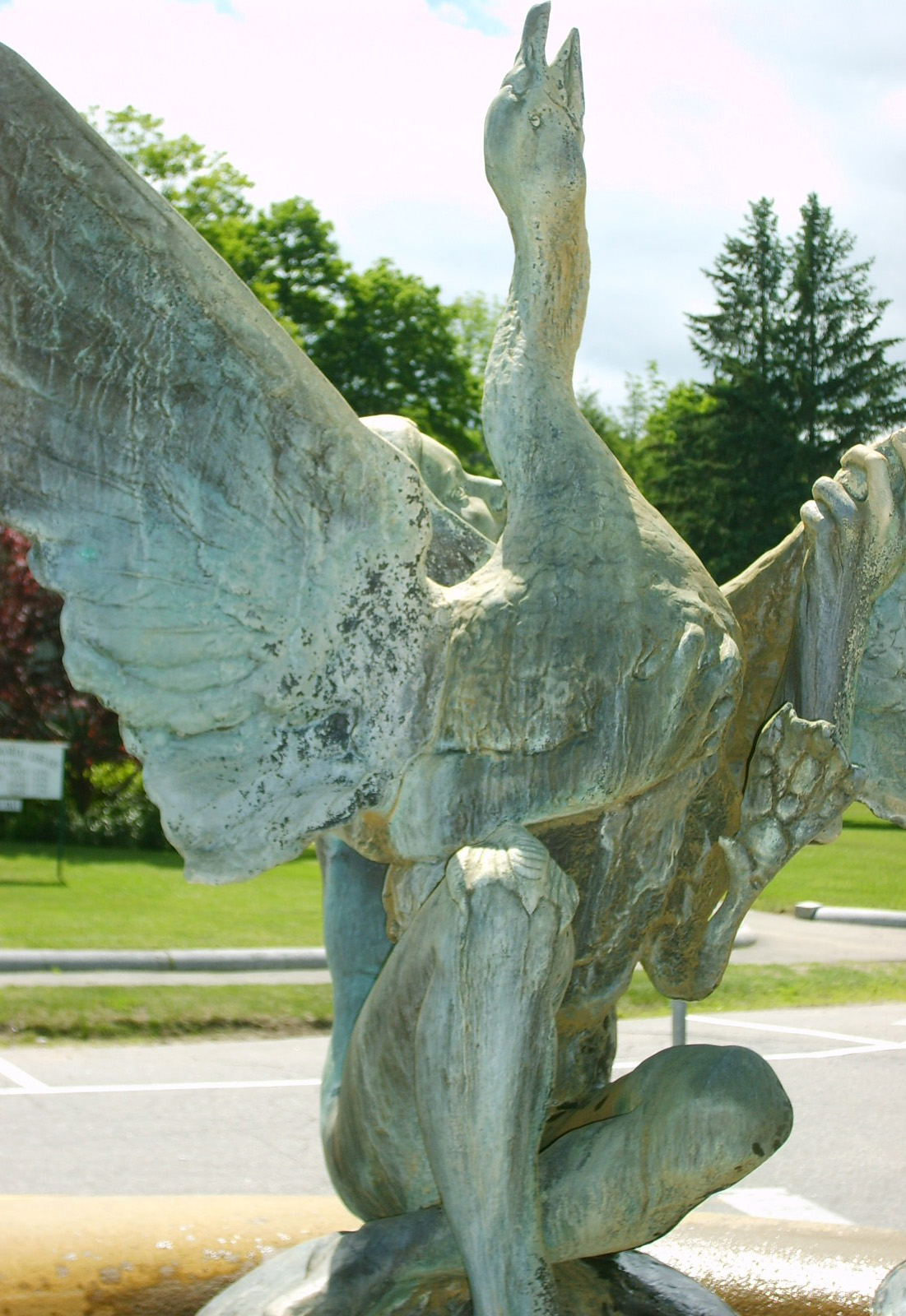
Detail of Kona Fountain by Russell Gerry Crook

Russell Gerry Crook (1869–1955) was an American sculptor and craftsman active in the Boston area.

Crook was born in San Francisco, and studied under John Henry Twachtman and Augustus Saint-Gaudens. He had his studio in Lincoln, Massachusetts. He created the Kona Fountain in Center Harbor, New Hampshire (1907), as well as figureheads for Dodge Watercars and a pair of terracotta polar bears.
