= Russell Henderson (disambiguation) =

Russell Henderson (1924–2015), was a British-Caribbean jazz musician.

Russell Henderson may also refer to:

- Russell Henderson (convict), in the 1998 hate crime murder of Matthew Shepard in Wyoming
- Russell Henderson, soccer player in 2009 HKFC International Soccer Sevens
