= Russell Moore =

Russell Moore may refer to:

- Big Chief Russell Moore (1912–1983), American jazz musician
- Russell Moore and IIIrd Tyme Out, American bluegrass band
- Russell D. Moore (born 1971), American Baptist theologian
