= Russell King =

Russell King may refer to:

- Russell King (fraudster) (born 1959), American fraudster involved in the purchase of Notts County Football Club
- Russell King (politician) (born 1940), Canadian physician and politician in New Brunswick
