= Russell Koehler =

Australian rules footballer

Personal information
- Full name: Russell Koehler
- Born: 9 January 1959 (age 67)
- Original team: Grovedale

Playing career^{1}
Years	Club	Games (Goals)
1978	Geelong	1 (1)
- ^{1} Playing statistics correct to the end of 1978.

Russell Koehler (born 9 January 1959) is a former Australian rules footballer who played for Geelong in the Victorian Football League (now known as the Australian Football League).
