= Russell Evans =

Russell Evans may refer to:

- Russell Evans (cricketer) (1965–2017), English cricketer and umpire
- Russell Evans (pastor) (born 1967), Australian writer, evangelist, and senior pastor of Planetshakers Church
- Red Evans (Russell Evans; 1906–1982), American MLB pitcher

== See also ==
- Russell Evans Smith (1908–1990), United States district judge
