= Russell Torrance =

Australian broadcaster, radio producer and musician

- Born: 1977
- Occupations: Broadcaster, radio producer, musician
- Known for: ABC Classic broadcaster
- Website: www.abc.net.au/listen/classic/russell-torrance/8098242

Russell Torrance is a broadcaster, radio producer and musician. He is most notable for his work as a broadcaster on Australian Broadcasting Corporation radio station ABC Classic.

== Career ==
Torrance was educated at Ridge Danyers College (now Cheadle and Marple Sixth Form College) in Marple, Greater Manchester. He graduated with honours from the University of Nottingham, where he studied music. He was subsequently invited to join the editorial team for the second edition of The New Grove Dictionary of Music and Musicians. After the dictionary was published, Torrance joined Classic FM in London where he worked as a music producer and web producer for nearly eight years.

In 2007, Torrance moved from the UK to Australia and has worked teaching radio (at the Central Institute of Technology in Perth), producing for ABC local radio and as a presenter and producer in commercial radio (for Southern Cross Austereo and 96.5 Wave FM). In 2015 he was awarded Best Producer, Music and Entertainment, non Metro at the Australian Commercial Radio Awards.

Torrance now works as a presenter and music programmer at ABC Classic.

=== Awards ===
- 2015 Australian Commercial Radio Awards - Best Producer, Music and Entertainment, non Metro - National award for producing commercial radio.

== Personal life ==
Torrance is married to Lauren and has a child. He also has a pet chihuahua called "Wolfy".
