= Russell Abrams =

American hedge fund manager

Russell Abrams is an American hedge fund manager and entrepreneur who is the founder of Russellcar, a taxi cab rent-to-own company in Buenos Aires.

== Career ==
=== Wall Street ===
Abrams started a career on Wall Street working at Goldman Sachs Asset Management developing quantitative models and doing research for Fischer Black, co-developer of the Black–Scholes options pricing model. Between 1997 and 2000, Abrams was the co-head of Equity Derivatives and Convertible Arbitrage at Merrill Lynch. In 2001, Abrams founded Titan Capital Group, which was one of the first volatility arbitrage funds and at its height had over $1 billion AUM. Titan funds were included in the Wall Street Journal's list of "The Hedge Fund 100" in 2009 and 2010, and won Hedgeweek's award for Best Relative Fund Manager in 2012.

=== Russellcar ===
While at Titan, Abrams made strategic investments in Argentina, which led to Abrams and his wife, Sandra Piedrabuena, founding Russellcar. Abrams has pledged to spend over $100 million on sustainable-only vehicles. The company offers credit to women in order to help them rent-to-own taxis.

== Other work ==
Abrams helped fund an endowment for the New York Public Library Young Lions Fiction Award.
