= Russell Wood =

Russell Wood may refer to:

- Russell Wood (cricketer) (1929–2015), English cricketer
- Russell Wood (swimmer) (born 1994), Canadian swimmer
- Russell A. Wood (1880–1952), American politician
