= Russell J. Anarde =

American general

Russell John Anarde (born 1950) is a retired brigadier general in the United States Air Force.

== Career ==
Anarde joined the Air Force in 1973. He would soon undertake LGM-25C Titan II training at Sheppard Air Force Base and Vandenberg Air Force Base. His first assignment following training was with the 308th Strategic Missile Wing. While there, he served as a deputy missile combat commander, missile combat crew commander, and instructor and evaluator. From there, he served in various roles with the 341st Strategic Missile Wing before being assigned to Headquarters Strategic Air Command in 1984.

In 1986, Anarde was given command of the 741st Strategic Missile Squadron. Three years later, he was assigned to Headquarters United States European Command, where he would serve as deputy chief of Arms Control Division and chief of Nuclear and Missile Division, Directorate of Plans and Policy. After returning to the United States, he was given command of the 351st Operations Group. In 1993, Anarde transferred to Headquarters Air Force Space Command. There he served as the head of the space and missile transition team before becoming chief of Missile Systems Requirements Division, Directorate of Requirements.

After serving as commander of the 21st Operations Group from 1994 to 1995, Anarde was assigned to The Pentagon. While there, he served as deputy director of operational requirements and deputy chief of staff for plans and operations. He was then given command of the 91st Space Wing before returning to The Pentagon as deputy director for operations of the National Military Command Center. In 1999, he returned to Headquarters Air Force Space Command to serve as director of plans and programs.

After his retirement in 2002, Anarde became an executive with Northrop Grumman.

Awards he received include the Air Force Distinguished Service Medal, the Defense Superior Service Medal with oak leaf cluster, the Legion of Merit, the Meritorious Service Medal with four oak leaf clusters, and the Air Force Commendation Medal.

== Education ==
- B.A., Business Administration – Washington State University
- M.B.A. – University of Utah
- M.S., Logistics Management – Air Force Institute of Technology
