= Russell Pysklywec =

- Born: January 3, 1970 (age 56); Belleville, Ontario
- Education: Queen's University; University of Toronto
- Scientific career
- Fields: Geology, Earth Science
- Workplaces: University of Toronto

Russell Pysklywec is a professor and former department chair of Earth Sciences at the University of Toronto. His research focus is on the evolution of the earth shell, the crust, and lithospheric mantle.
