= Russell Earl Kelly =

American Christian theologian and author

- Born: Jacksonville, Florida, USA
- Occupations: Theologian, author, speaker and blogger
- Website: www.tithing-russkelly.com

Russell Earl Kelly is an American Christian theologian, apologist, speaker, and blogger, who is the author of several non-fiction books on theology. Kelly writes about his opinions regarding tithing, arguing that the practice of giving 10% of one's income to a church is not a Christian obligation.

Russell Earl Kelly has received media attention for his views on his opinions about tithing. He participated in a live 90-minute debate on tithing in London on Revelation TV. On November 23, 2007, the Wall Street Journal published an article by Suzanne Sataline, "The Backlash Against Tithing", which featured Kelly and his views. On March 2, 2008, Kelly was featured in a CBS Sunday Morning cover story titled "To Tithe or Not to Tithe". He was also subsequently mentioned in Charisma magazine online.

== Biography ==
Kelly was raised in a Baptist household in Jacksonville, Florida, as one of six children. In 1960, his family moved to Marietta, Georgia. He served in the United States Air Force from June 1962 to June 1966. During this time, he studied Chinese Mandarin at Yale University and was later assigned to the Transcription Department stationed in Taiwan. Kelly currently lives in Washington, Georgia, where he teaches at the Victory Baptist Church Bible Institute.

== Education ==
Kelly graduated cum laude from Sprayberry High, Georgia in 1962, and from Southern Missionary College (now Southern Adventist University) in Tennessee in 1976. He served as a pastor for churches in Georgia, North Dakota, and South Carolina.

In August 2000, Kelly earned a Master of Theology (Th. M.) and a Doctor of Philosophy (Ph. D.) cum laude from Covington Theological Seminary, an independent Baptist institution in Fort Oglethorpe, Georgia. His doctoral dissertation focused on the subject of tithing. His first book, Should the Church Teach Tithing? A Theologian's Conclusions about a Taboo Doctrine, was based on this dissertation. His second book is Exposing Seventh-day Adventism, published in 2005, followed by From Gethsemane to Ascension, An Ultimate Harmony of the Gospel, Easter and Resurrection Plays in 2008.

== Criticism and countercriticism ==
Some critics have questioned Kelly's educational credentials, stating that degrees from unaccredited institutions such as Covington Theological Seminary invalidate his Ph.D. Others have reportedly challenged his sincerity and motives. Kelly addresses these criticisms on a webpage, noting his undergraduate degree is from the accredited Southern Adventist University and that his educational choices were limited after becoming legally blind in 1989.

== Personal life ==
Kelly identifies theologically as a conservative evangelical dispensational Baptist.

He has been legally blind since 1989.

== Reception ==
Kelly's book, Should the Church Teach Tithing, published in 2001, has been discussed in various religious publications and forums. A July 2003 Christianity Today letter to the editor commented positively on the book. In 2003, New Jerusalem Ministries listed the book as a suggested reading. In 2004, David Alan Black published an essay supporting Kelly's views on tithing.

Andreas J. Köstenberger and David A. Croteau referenced Malachi 3:8 in their 2006 paper, "Will a Man Rob God? (Malachi 3:8): A Study of Tithing in the Old and New Testaments", published in Bulletin of Biblical Research 26.1 (2006).

On November 23, 2007, The Wall Street Journal published "The Backlash Against Tithing", featuring Kelly.

On November 27, 2007, in response to the Wall Street Journal article, Baptist Press published "The Bible and Giving" by Daniel Akin, President of Southeastern Baptist Theological Seminary.

In 2007, WAVA-FM in Washington, D. C. mentioned Russell Kelly, his book, and his website.

On March 2, 2008, following the Wall Street Journal article, Kelly was interviewed and featured in the CBS Sunday Morning News cover story, "To Tithe or Not to Tithe".

On March 7, 2008, Baptist Press published a response to Kelly's CBS News comments by Kenneth Hemphill, mentioning Kelly and his book. Kelly has publicly invited Hemphill to a dialogue, details of which are accessible from Kelly's blog.

On March 11, 2008, Charisma magazine mentioned Russell Kelly and the CBS article online.

On July 18, 2008, the Texas Baptist Standard printed Kelly's comments in response to a tithing article.

On September 14, 2008, The St. Petersburg Times mentioned Kelly and his book, Should the Church Teach Tithing, in a news article.

On March 30, 2011, he participated in a live debate on tithing in London on Revelation TV.

In March 2018, Kelly appeared on Susan Puzio's Blogtalk Radio and Rapture Ready multiple times to discuss tithing and Seventh-day Adventism.
