= Russell Martin =

Russell or Russ Martin may refer to:

- Russell Martin (baseball) (born 1983), Canadian baseball player
- Russell Martin (footballer) (born 1986), British football manager and former player
- Russ Martin (1960–2021), American radio presenter
- Russ Martin (American football) (born 1956), American football player and coach
