= Russell Hill =

Russell Hill may refer to:

- Russell Hill (artist) (born 1988), British artist
- Russell Hill (footballer) (1920–1987), Australian rules footballer
- Russell Hill (war correspondent), see New York Herald Tribune
- Russell Hill, Croydon, an area in the London Borough of Croydon
- Russell Hill, a geographic feature Wyoming County, Pennsylvania

== See also ==
- 1995 Russell Hill subway accident, a deadly train crash that occurred in Toronto, Ontario, Canada
