= Russell Young =

Russell Young may refer to:

- Russ Young (Russell Charles Young, 1902-1984), American baseball player
- Russell Young (tennis) (1902–1990), New Zealand tennis player, army officer, and corporate executive
- Russell Young (American football) (1912–?), American football and basketball coach
- Russell Young (artist) (born 1959), British-American artist

== See also ==
- John Russell "Russ" Young (1882-1966), American politician and journalist
