= Russell Cunningham =

Russell Cunningham may refer to:

- Russell Cunningham (producer), Australian film and television producer
- Russell Cunningham (Canadian politician) (1905–1985), Nova Scotia CCF leader, 1945–1953
- Russell McWhortor Cunningham (1855–1921), American Democratic politician, acting Governor of Alabama, 1904–1905
