= GuideIT =

Information Technology Company

- Company type: Private
- Industry: Information Technology
- Founded: 2013; 12 years ago
- Headquarters: Plano, Texas, United States
- Key people: Ross Perot Jr. (Board Member); Russell Freeman (CEO)
- Services: Information Technology Consulting; Managed IT Services; Cybersecurity
- Website: https://www.GuideIT.com

GuideIT is an American information technology services provider founded in 2013, by a group of former Perot Systems and Dell Services employees. Based in Plano, Texas, GuideIT provides information technology services in the industries of health care, banking, insurance and others. Health care accounts for about half of the company's revenue as of 2018, from services such as implementation of electronic health records systems.

== History ==
Former Perot Systems and Dell Services employees Scott Barnes, Russell Freeman, Jack Evans, John Furniss, and Tim Morris, founded GuideIT in 2013, after Dell acquired Perot Systems in 2009. In 2014, the Perot Group led by Ross Perot Jr. became the largest stakeholder of the company

In 2014, Chuck Lyles became CEO of Guide IT, replacing Scott Barnes, one of the company’s founders who went on to serve as managing director. Lyles had previously been president of the company’s health care solutions division.
