= Spell Cast =

Spelling game show in Singapore

Spell Cast is a spelling game show in Singapore that featured children between the ages of nine and twelve. Season one aired between 5 June 2007 - 31 July 2007 and season two started airing in January 2010. It was hosted by Shane Mardjuki in its first season and by Sarah Tan in its second season. There were major changes to the game show for its second season, changes included game format and the programme being shifted from Channel 5 to Okto.

The first season was rerun on Channel 5's okto on 5 belt from 6 July 2024, Weekends at 7am.

== Season 1 ==
The first season of the show was hosted by Shane Mardjuki, and featured a prize consisting of a trophy and S$10,000 for the winner. There were three main rounds in this season: The first round required contestants to select the correct spelling from three variations of a word in five seconds; each correct answer was worth five points, the second round required contestants to fill in a missing letter in a word in five seconds. Ten questions are asked in this round; after every five questions, a bonus question is asked where the contestants would have to unscramble the five correct letters from the previous five questions asked to form a word using a clue given by the host. Each correct answer in the second round (including the two bonus questions) is worth five points. The third and final round was an oral spelling round of tic-tac-toe, where contestants would have to spell out a word verbally within ten seconds after being given the word and its definition by the host. The contestant took turns (starting with the contestant with the most points from the first two rounds) to choose a square (1 to 16) on a 4 x 4 game board, with a correct answer giving them the square. The first two contestants (the first contestant in the finals) to form a tic-tac-toe (three squares horizontally, vertically or diagonally) won the game and advanced to the next round. In the event a tie where two contestants are even on squares, a tiebreaker is played. The first contestant to buzz in and spell the tiebreaker word correctly won. An estimated 1,200 children participated in the auditions held at MediaCorp, and only 48 of them made it into the qualifier rounds which were aired on local broadcaster MediaCorp's Channel 5.

Each qualifier round featured eight contestants, with eight questions asked in the first round. Only two contestants proceeded from the qualifiers to the two semi-final episodes, which comprised a total of twelve contestants, six in each episode. In the semi-finals, the number of questions asked in the first round was reduced to six.

In the final episode, four contestants remained in the competition, namely: Jesse Chang, Sheena Lee, Russell Soh and Jayesh Melvani. In the first round, Jesse was eliminated after receiving the lowest number of points amongst the four contestants. Jayesh was then eliminated in the second round after receiving the lowest number of points, however it was pointed out by host Shane Mardjuki that he was the youngest amongst the four finalists, being only nine years old. During the final round of spelling tic-tac-toe, Russell was allowed to start the round first as he had attained the highest number of points in the first two rounds. After an intense final round, with words such as 'rehabilitate', 'excruciating' and the final winning word, 'hieroglyph', Russell won the competition, and received the Spell Cast trophy and a cash prize of S$10,000.

== Season 2 ==
The following season of the show came in January 2010, almost three years after the first season ended, bringing with it numerous changes. Firstly, the host of the show was changed; instead of Shane Mardjuki, Sarah Tan hosted this season. The game was reconstructed completely, although maintaining the original three-round system, albeit without elimination between rounds, hence giving those who had done badly in earlier rounds a chance to catch up with the other contestants. It was also worth noting that instead of airing the show on the more popular Channel 5 on Tuesdays at 8:30pm as was with the first season, season two of Spell Cast was aired on the recently introduced okto channel on Sundays at 11:30am.

In the first round, contestants were tasked with spelling a given word on a keyboard. In the second round, contestants had to take turns at verbally spelling a given word. In this round, if a contestant misspelled his given word, another contestant could buzz in to have a chance at spelling it correctly. In the final round, contestants had to buzz in to spell given words verbally within ten seconds, with the maximum time in the round being 4 minutes 30 seconds.

The second season of Spell Cast was won by Izzat Rashad, 12 from St Andrew's Junior School. He walked away with S$10,000 as well as the Spell Cast champion's trophy.
