= Natural Law Party of Canada candidates in the 1997 Canadian federal election =

The Natural Law Party of Canada ran several candidates in the 1997 federal election, none of whom were elected.

== Quebec ==
=== LaSalle-Émard: Russell Guest ===
Russell Guest became involved in transcendental meditation in the late 1960s, when he was a student at the University of British Columbia. He later became a transcendental meditation teacher and served on the board of directors for the Transcendental Movement in Canada. Guest paid tribute to the Maharishi Mahesh Yogi upon the latter's death 2008, telling a Toronto Star reporter that the Maharishi "lived in bliss" and "always said that the underlying nature of life is bliss."

Guest ran for the Natural Law Party in two federal elections and one Quebec provincial election.

Electoral record
Election	Division	Party	Votes	%	Place	Winner
1993 federal	Parry Sound-Muskoka	Natural Law	263	0.57	6/8	Andy Mitchell, Liberal
1994 provincial	Argenteuil	Natural Law	224	0.62	5/5	Régent Beaudet, Liberal
1997 federal	LaSalle-Émard	Natural Law	453	0.85	5/5	Paul Martin, Liberal Party

=== Notre-Dame-de-Grâce—Lachine: Ronald Bessette ===
Bessette was a perennial candidate for the Natural Law Party. He listed himself as an architectural technician in the 1997 election.

He first sought election to the House of Commons of Canada in the 1993 election, and received 551 votes in Lachine—Lac-Saint-Louis for a sixth-place finish against Liberal Party candidate Clifford Lincoln. He was listed as residing in Pierrefonds, Montreal, Quebec at the time.

Bessette ran as a candidate of the Natural Law Party of Quebec in the 1994 Quebec provincial election, and received 226 votes in Marguerite-Bourgeoys for a sixth-place finish against Liberal Liza Frulla.

He later campaigned for the Legislative Assembly of Ontario in that province's 1995 provincial election, and received 263 votes (1.04%) for a sixth-place finish in Windsor—Sandwich. The winner was Sandra Pupatello of the Liberal. A newspaper report from the period lists him as residing in North York, Toronto, Ontario (Windsor Star, 26 May 1995).

He received 569 votes in the 1997 election, finishing fifth against Liberal candidate Marlene Jennings.

== Ontario ==
=== Eglinton—Lawrence: Robyn Brandon ===
Brandon was an office worker with an interest in social methods of stress reduction. She received 397 votes (0.91%), finishing fifth against Liberal incumbent Joe Volpe.

=== Ottawa—Vanier: Roger Bouchard ===
Bouchard is an author, and has worked with l'Association des auteurs Franco-ontariens (Ottawa Citizen, 2 May 1997). He argued that the NLP would bring a "peaceful revolution" to Canada, and spoke in favour of an all-party government with experts from various social fields (Toronto Star, 21 September 1993). During the 1993 campaign, he wrote that he had been a practitioner of transcendental meditation for twenty years (Ottawa Citizen, 21 October 1993).

Electoral record
Election	Division	Party	Votes	%	Place	Winner
1993 federal	Ottawa—Vanier	NLP	438	0.90	8/10	Jean-Robert Gauthier, Liberal
1997 federal	Ottawa—Vanier	NLP	330		6/8	Mauril Belanger, Liberal Party

=== Parry Sound-Muskoka: Rick Alexander ===
Rick Alexander is from Huntsville and at one time worked as a teacher. He ran for the Natural Law Party in two federal elections and one provincial election.

He was forty-two years old in the 1993 campaign, lived in Ottawa, and was a project manager for the Heaven on Earth Development Corporation, the centre of the transcendental meditation movement in Canada. He called for an all-party system of government and said that centralization and inefficient social programs had caused the national deficit.

Electoral record
Election	Division	Party	Votes	%	Place	Winner
1993 federal	Huron—Bruce	Natural Law	243	0.49	7/7	Paul Steckle, Liberal
1995 provincial	Lanark—Renfrew	Natural Law	237	0.66	7/7	Leo Jordan, Progressive Conservative
1997 federal	Parry Sound-Muskoka	Natural Law	133	0.31	7/7	Andy Mitchell, Liberal Party

=== Sudbury: Roy Hankonen ===
Roy Hankonen described himself as a supervisor. He received 247 votes (0.62%), finishing sixth against Liberal incumbent Diane Marleau.

== Manitoba ==
=== Larry Decter (Winnipeg South) ===
Decter was born in Winnipeg, Manitoba. He has a Bachelor of Science degree from the University of Manitoba, and also attended Maharishi European Research University (MERU) in Switzerland. He worked as a researcher and teacher with the transcendental meditation movement.

Decter campaigned for the Natural Law Party in the 1993 and 1997 Canadian elections. He resided in Huntsville, Ontario during the 1993 campaign, and contested Windsor West in the same province. During this campaign, he has quoted as asserting, "There is no unemployment in nature; there are no unnecessary atoms in the universe. Everything has a place and a purpose. Yet we human beings, the most highly evolved species on the planet, have somehow lost touch with the unlimited intelligence and organizing power of natural law." (Windsor Star, 22 October 1993) He received 138 votes, finishing sixth against longtime Liberal incumbent Herb Gray.

He received 153 votes (0.40%) in 1997, finishing sixth against Liberal Reg Alcock.

Decter is likely related to Ron Decter, a prominent figure for the Natural Law Party in Manitoba.

== Saskatchewan ==
=== Patrick James Coulterman (Wanuskewin) ===
Coulterman was a maintenance supervisor at Saskatoon's Community Clinic during the 1990s (Saskatoon Star-Phoenix, 17 May 1997). He wrote against genetically modified foods shortly before the 1997 election, arguing that they were a danger to the health of Canadians and criticizing the provincial government for funding Ag-West Biotech (Saskatoon Star-Phoenix, 6 March 1997). Others criticized the accuracy of his arguments, noting they were drawn largely from NLP-related sources (20 March 1997).

He advocated transcendental meditation to resolve tensions in Kosovo in 1999, claiming that president Joaquim Chissano of Mozambique has successfully used the technique to end twenty years of civil war in his country (14 April 1999).

Electoral record
Election	Division	Party	Votes	%	Place	Winner
1993 federal	Saskatoon—Clark's Crossing	NLP	188		6/8	Chris Axworthy, New Democratic Party
1997 federal	Calgary West	NLP	138	0.42	6/6	Maurice Vellacott, Reform

== Alberta ==
=== Frank Haika (Calgary West) ===
Haika was 48 years old during the 1997 election. He has a Bachelor of Commerce degree in Accounting from the University of Calgary and credentials from the Canadian Securities Institute, and works as an investment adviser. He has also taught transcendental meditation (Calgary Herald, 7 October 1993). Haika wrote in support of mandatory labels for genetically modified food in 1996 (CH, 25 November 1996). In 1999, he argued that yogic flyers could bring peace to troubled areas of the world such as Kosovo (Montreal Gazette, 8 April 1999).

He campaigned for the Natural Law Party in two federal elections, and also ran for the Natural Law Party of Alberta in 1997. He unexpectedly endorsed his opponent, Premier Ralph Klein, in the 1997 provincial election and called for Klein to be re-elected as a reward for his success in balancing the provincial budget (CH, 27 February 1997).

Electoral record
Election	Division	Party	Votes	%	Place	Winner
1993 federal	Calgary West	NLP	483	0.84	6/8	Stephen Harper, Reform
1997 provincial	Calgary-Elbow	NLP	75		5/5	Ralph Klein, Progressive Conservative
1997 federal	Calgary West	NLP	293		6/6	Rob Anders, Reform
