= Russell Nesbit =

American acrobat and art model

Russell Nesbit was an acrobat, coach, and leader of the Flying Nesbits, who performed live and on television beginning in the 1950s. He was also an art model in the Washington metropolitan area from the late 1940s until the 1990s. He died in November 2001 of colon cancer at the age of 81.

== Early life ==
Charles James Russell Nesbit was born (c. 1920) in Statesville, North Carolina, where he began tumbling as a child after seeing acrobats in a traveling circus. (Note: In a filmed interview, Nesbit said he was born in Charlotte, North Carolina, taken by his adoptive mother as an infant to Statesville, North Carolina where he grew up, and that he was six when he began tumbling.) In the 1930s, he moved to Washington, D.C., graduating from Cardozo High School. He excelled at swimming and running as well as gymnastics. His marriage to Margaret Magdalene Walker, whom he included in his act, ended in divorce.

== Acrobatics ==
In the 1940s Nesbit began performing and teaching as a volunteer at the now historic 12th Street YMCA, and later at a local Boys and Girls Club. During World War II he was a physical fitness instructor with the United States Army Air Forces. His particular specialty was teaching paratroopers to land without injury.

Beginning with his family and students from the YMCA, Nesbit formed an acrobatic team eventually called the "Flying Nesbits". During the segregation era the Flying Nesbits performed as a warm-up act for Black performers and at historically Black theaters in the eastern United States, including the Howard Theatre (Washington), Regal Theater (Chicago), Royal Theatre (Baltimore) and the Apollo Theater (New York City). They were also part of the half-time performances with the Harlem Globetrotters and breaks during games of Negro league baseball teams while touring with the Birmingham Black Barons and the Indianapolis Clowns (Note: The Indianapolis Clowns signed Hank Aaron to his first contract in 1952.). On road trips, parents and a tutor accompanied the troupe. Commenting on the Detroit Stars, Lawrence D. Hogan notes that in 1955 the team was likely better known for the performance of the Flying Nesbits.

In the 1950s they were on live TV, with appearances on The Original Amateur Hour and the ABC program Super Circus. A specialty of the troupe was "risley", Nesbit juggling a young member of the team on his feet while doing a shoulder stand. While continuing to perform as amateurs for prizes or expenses, they would audition to become a professional circus act, but had only brief runs. Ebony magazine reported John Ringling North saying that "Nesbit would be a great Big Top performer — if he were white".

In 1962 Nesbit walked down the interior staircase of the Washington Monument on his hands. The 898 steps required one hour and 38 minutes, besting a prior time set in 1951. Not having permission from the Interior Department, the stunt was done with only a photographer, an editor from Ebony Magazine, and his girlfriend to record his time. A previous attempt in 1953, also without permission, had been stopped just short of finishing by a park ranger.

Nesbit was convicted in 1963 of violating a statute enacted in 1885 (Note: Prior to District of Columbia home rule, local laws were Federal statutes.) prohibiting acrobatic performances in the District of Columbia by any minor under the age of fourteen as constituting "attempted cruelty to children", however performances in other cities continued. On appeal, the conviction was reversed in December 1964, noting that the Flying Nesbits' performances did not employ any apparatus, and that the fitness of American youth had greatly improved since the law was enacted. It was also noted that the participation of minor children was with the consent of their parents, and no injuries had occurred during the years Nesbit had been coaching.

As part of the Civil rights movement, the Flying Nesbits performed at marches in DC, such as Solidarity Day and at the Poor People's Campaign, both in 1968.

== Art modeling ==
Acrobatics never becoming a full-time profession, Nesbit had a variety of "day jobs". One occupation that spanned decades was modeling for art classes at the art schools and colleges in the Washington area, often for the Corcoran School of the Arts and Design. He began modeling in 1946, after placing third in a "most muscular man" contest at the YMCA. One of the judges in the contest offered Nesbit 75 cents an hour to pose for classes at an art school he ran at Logan Circle. Nesbit posed (Note: In the 1940s, male models in the United States were usually not nude, but wore a jockstrap. Full nudity became the norm in the 1960s.) for the "Little Paris Group" founded by Lois Mailou Jones and Céline Marie Tabary as an alternative for African-American artists ignored by the arts establishment in Washington, DC. He continued posing into his 70s, often taking acrobatic postures such as headstands.

== See also ==
=== Little Paris Group artists ===
- Richard W. Dempsey
- Delilah Pierce
- Alma Thomas
