= Russell Stone =

Russell Stone may refer to:

- Russell Stone (historian) (1923–2026), New Zealand historian
- Russell Stone (singer) (1946–2024), British singer
