= Russell Simpson =

Russell Simpson may refer to:

- Russell Simpson (actor) (1880–1959), American character actor
- Russell Simpson (tennis) (born 1954), New Zealand tennis player
