= Russell Cook =

Russell Cook may refer to:

- Russell Cook (musician), hammered dulcimer player and builder from Oklahoma
- Russell Cook (footballer) (born 1947), former Australian rules footballer
- Russ Cook (born 1997), an English endurance athlete and YouTuber
