= Russell Froelich =

American photographer

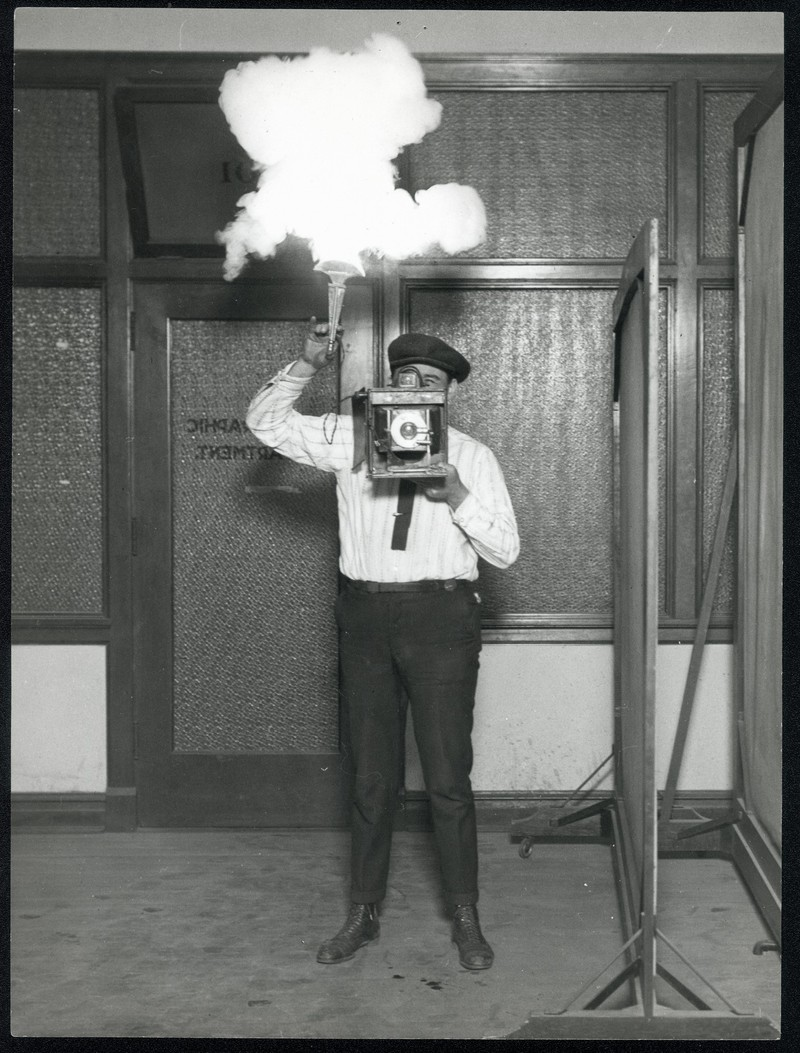
Russell Froelich Taking a Photograph with Flash

Russell Froelich (1890–1958) was an American photographer who lived in St. Louis, Missouri. He is known for his aerial photography as well as his photographs of local St. Louis culture. He also spent time designing and building aircraft.

== Pre-WWI ==
Russell Froelich was born in 1890 in Ohio and moved to St. Louis in his late teens. In his early twenties, he worked with local pilots to design and build aircraft. He began to photograph these planes, and soon became the official photographer for the Benoist Aircraft Company. In 1911, he was featured in “The American Photo Engraver” for an original design of an aircraft. He called his invention a monoplane rather than an airplane, hoping to achieve automatic stability by construction and without mechanical device.

== Post-WWI ==
After the U.S. entry into World War I in 1917, he honed his photography skills by using wing-mounted cameras. This idea aided the U.S. Signal Corps in developing terrain maps in Europe during the war. After the conclusion of World War I, Froelich continued his aerial photography but also began working for local St. Louis newspapers, such as the St. Louis Post-Dispatch, the St. Louis Globe-Democrat, and the St. Louis Star. He photographed numerous scenes in and around St. Louis, including photographs of streets, pets, and natural disasters. He also worked on creating early color photographic techniques.
