= Russell Warren =

Russell Warren may refer to:

- Russell Warren (architect) (1783–1860), American architect
- Russell Warren (cricketer) (born 1971), English cricketer
- Russell Warren Howe (1925–2008), English author and journalist

== See also ==
- George Warren Russell (1854–1937), New Zealand politician
