= Russell George =

Russell George may refer to:

- J. Russell George (1963–2024), American attorney
- Russell George (American politician) (born 1946), American politician and lawyer
- Russell George (Welsh politician) (born 1974), Welsh politician
