= Russell Carter =

Russell Carter may refer to:

- Russell Carter (American football) (born 1962), American former NFL player and sprinter
- Russell Carter (basketball) (born 1985), American former basketball player
- Russell Gordon Carter (1892–1957), American author
- Russell Kelso Carter (1849–1928), American Christian minister, professor, songwriter, and advocate of British Israelism
