= Russell Howard (disambiguation) =

Russell Howard (born 1980) is an English comedian, actor, and television- and radio presenter.

Russell Howard may also refer to:

- Russell D. Howard, American veteran Special Forces officer, academic, tutor, writer, and counter-terrorism strategist
- Russell J. Howard, Australian executive, entrepreneur, and scientist
- Russell W. Howard, American actor and musician
- Russ Howard (born 1956), Canadian Olympic curler

== See also ==
- Howard Russell (disambiguation)
