= Russell Taylor =

Russell Taylor may refer to:

- Russell Taylor (architect), British architect
- Russell Taylor (cartoonist) (born 1960), British cartoonist, writer, journalist and composer
- Russell Taylor (director), director of the Jared Foundation, a non-profit organization established by Jared Fogle
- Russell Taylor (musician), American singer and songwriter
- Russell Taylor (rugby union) (1914–1965), Wales international rugby union player
- Russell Taylor (journalist), British journalist
- Russ Taylor (baseball broadcaster) (1926–1977), Canadian play-by-play baseball announcer

== Fictional characters ==
- Russell Taylor, in the US police procedural TV series The Closer, played by Robert Gossett

== See also ==
- Russi Taylor (1944–2019), American voice actress
