= Russell Webb =

Russell Webb may refer to:

- Russell Webb (musician) (born 1958), Scottish bass guitarist
- Russell Webb (water polo) (born 1945), American retired water polo player
- Alexander Russell Webb (1846–1916), American writer, publisher, and diplomat, early convert to Islam
