= Russell Porter =

Russell Porter may refer to:

- Russell W. Porter (1871–1949), American artist, engineer, amateur astronomer and explorer
- Russell Porter (actor) (born 1964), actor appearing in BBC production The Brittas Empire
