= Russell Stewart (disambiguation) =

Russell Stewart may refer to:

- Russell Stewart (born 1960), Australian former professional darts player
- Russell Stewart (cricketer) (born 1946), New Zealand former cricketer
- Russell Stewart (rugby league), New Zealand rugby league footballer
