= Russell E. Havenstrite =

Russell Havenstrite
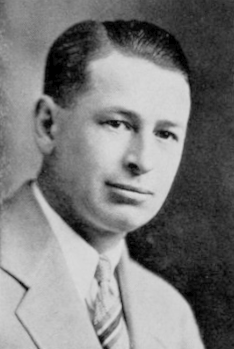
- Born: March 18, 1896; Lovell, Oklahoma Territory, U.S.
- Died: March 18, 1958 (aged 62); Santa Monica, California, U.S.
- Spouse: Edith White

Russell Easton Havenstrite (1896–1958) was an American wildcatter and polo player.

== Early life ==
Russell Havenstrite was born March 18, 1896, in Lovell, Oklahoma. His parents were Jacob W. Havenstrite and Jennie M. Stirk. His mother's maiden name was Stirn.

== Career ==
In the 1920s, Havenstrite moved from Lovell, Oklahoma to Signal Hill, California in the Greater Los Angeles area to drill oil. In 1932, he moved to Alaska to find oil. He became interested in possible oil found at Iniskin, near Homer, Alaska. In 1936, he established the Iniskin Bay Associates, together with Carlton Beal (1914–1994), Walt Disney (1901–1966), Darryl F. Zanuck (1902–1979) and Hal Roach (1892–1992). By 1938, they began drilling their first oil well at Iniskin. In 1941, the firm found oil in Newhall, Santa Clarita, California and became prosperous.

After the Second World War, Havenstrite drilled again at Iniskin, with the financial backing of Chicago banker Hugo Anderson, the father of Robert Orville Anderson (1917–2007). However, Harold L. Ickes (1874–1952), who served as United States Secretary of the Interior from 1933 to 1946, had blocked him from drilling. In 1946, he flew the Andersons, the Disneys and the Zanucks on his private Douglas DC-3 plane to see his jade mine in Kotzebue, Alaska and his gold mine in Candle, Alaska. In 1954, he drilled a second well at Iniskin, but he stopped sometime in 1955. Two weeks after he stopped, Richfield Oil found more oil at Iniskin.

== Polo ==
Havenstrite established the Beverly Hills Polo Club in Beverly Hills, California. In 1950, he hired ten-goal polo champion Robert Skene (1914-1997) to manage the club. The same year, he and Jimmy McHugh judged Queen of Mexican Polo contestants at the BHPC. He also played polo at the Uplifters Polo Club in Pacific Palisades, Los Angeles with Charles Farrell (1901–1990), Frank Borzage (1894–1962) and Walt Disney (1901–1966).

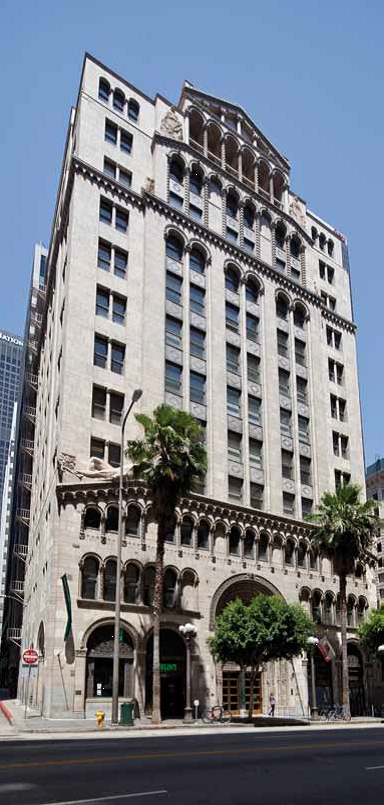
The Fine Arts Building in Downtown Los Angeles, the building the Havenstrite’s owned. The penthouse was used as their private social space and party club.

== Personal life and death ==
Havenstrite was married to Edith White. They had a parrot. They owned the Fine Arts Building located at 811 West 7th Street in Los Angeles. And used the penthouse as a personal space. From 1938 onwards, they resided in Beverly Hills, California and attended high society events. They also went shooting with William Woodward, Jr. and his wife Ann in Cooch Behar, India. Moreover, they attended fundraisers for the Republican Party. He was a member of the Bohemian Club, the Los Angeles Country Club and the Bel Air Country Club.

Russell and Edith had a daughter, Phyllis, on September 29, 1922 in Oxnard, California. She attended the Douglas School for Girls in Pebble Beach, California.

Havenstrite died of a heart ailment in Santa Monica on March 18, 1958.
