= Russell Vincent =

Australian cricketer (born 1954)

Personal information
- Born: 25 March 1954 (age 72); Jamestown, South Australia
- Source: Cricinfo, 29 September 2020

Russell Vincent (born 25 March 1954) is an Australian cricketer. He played in three first-class matches for South Australia in 1976/77.

== See also ==
- List of South Australian representative cricketers
