= Russell Lloyd =

Russell Lloyd may refer to:

- Russell G. Lloyd Sr. (1932–1980), American politician, mayor of Evansville, 1972–1980
- Russell G. Lloyd Jr. (born 1950), American politician, mayor of Evansville, 2000–2004, son of Russell G. Lloyd Sr.
- Russell Lloyd (film editor) (1916–2008), British-born American film editor
