= Storyville Slayer =

Unidentified American serial killer

- Other name: "New Orleans Serial Killer"

Details
- Victims: 12+
- Span of crimes: 1991–1995
- Country: United States
- State: Louisiana
- Date apprehended: N/A

The Storyville Slayer is the nickname given to an American serial killer who murdered at least 12 prostitutes in New Orleans, Louisiana. Through the course of the investigation, two separate suspects were considered, one of whom was convicted of one murder, leading investigators to believe that multiple killers are responsible.

== Modus operandi ==
The perpetrator(s) mainly targeted girls and women of African-American descent, aged between 17 and 42, as victims. Most of them were strangled to death, while a number of others were beaten and drowned in canals and rivers, and then dumped in swamps, rivers or canals near highways bordering the western shores of Lake Pontchartrain. Due to the isolated locations of the dumping sites, the victims' bodies were left in water spanning from several weeks to several years, resulting in extreme decomposition and destruction of incriminating evidence. Some of the victims have never been identified.

=== Timeline ===
According to investigators, the crimes began in the summer of 1991, after a young black woman informed police about an attempt on her life. According to her testimony, she had boarded the car of an unknown man in Algiers sometime in July, and after having a conversation with him, the man strangled her into unconsciousness and dropped her off on the streets. Her name has never been disclosed, and she is referred to as "Brenda" in case files.

During her testimony, "Brenda" gave a description of her attacker, from which an identikit was created. She described him as a muscular, well-dressed, middle-aged black male who drove a dark-colored vehicle, possibly a Buick Regal or Chevrolet Monte Carlo.

On August 4, 1991, the body of 17-year-old Danielle Britton was found in a ditch not far from where "Brenda" had been abducted. Her body had been covered with garbage, and an autopsy determined that she had been beaten and strangled. Britton had dropped out of school shortly before her death, and was last seen in a New Orleans bar next to an unknown man. It is unclear where she was employed, but nothing indicated that she engaged in prostitution or used drugs.

On September 3, the body of 21-year-old Tyra Tassin was found. A mother of three, she had a criminal record for drug possession.

On September 22, the body of 28-year-old Charlene Price was found in a New Orleans park, just one mile from where Britton was found. An autopsy determined that she had been beaten and strangled. Price had a history of drug abuse, but it is unknown if she was a prostitute.

November 21, the body of 37-year-old Regina Oko was discovered. A mother of three, she had multiple arrests for prostitution during her lifetime. An autopsy deduced that she had been strangled, and prior to her death, had taken a large dose of cocaine, which could have caused an overdose.

On December 14, skeletal remains were found in a ditch near a highway, not far from where Britton's body was discovered. The autopsy established that the remains belonged to a young African American woman, who was in her early twenties and approximately 5 feet and 2 inches tall. Despite a distinct characteristic- noticeably protruding front teeth- she was not identified. The victim is referred to as "Jane Doe No. 1", and was presumably strangled.

January 4, 1992, the body of 29-year-old Lydia Madison was found dead beneath the South Claiborne Avenue overpass near Earhart Boulevard, which was 8 blocks away from police headquarters. Madison had prior arrests for drugs and prostitution, and her cause of death was ruled as strangulation.

June 2, 25-year-old George Williams' body was found in the LaBranche Wetlands area of St. Charles Parish. An autopsy determined that she had been strangled. Investigators determined that she was transgender, and had worked as an exotic dancer at a New Orleans nightclub. Williams had prior arrest for robbery and drug possession.

July 25, the body of 33-year-old Brenda Filson was found in the waters of a canal near I-55. Like Williams, Filson was transgender and worked at a nightclub under the name 'Brenda Bewitch'.

September 21, the remains of 29-year-old Regiter Martin were discovered in the waters of another canal near a highway. She was an impoverished mother of three who engaged in prostitution and had several previous arrests.

February 20, 1993, the skeletal remains of 30-year-old Cheryl Lewis were discovered in the waters of a canal near Hahnville. Lewis was an impoverished mother of four and known prostitute with several arrests, and had been strangled to death. However, while investigating her death, authorities learned that she was last seen alive on February 2, getting into the car of an unidentified white male. Her mother Lillian reported her missing the same day.

February 21, the body of 42-year-old Delores Mack was found in the waters of a canal near a highway, not far from the Lewis crime scene. She too had been strangled, but had no known history with either drugs or prostitution.

During this period, according to investigators, the killer(s) committed several other murders, but due to various circumstances, the bodies of the victims were found only in early 1994.

February 5, 1994, skeletal remains were found in St. John the Baptist Parish, later determined to be a young woman between the ages of 25 and 35. She had been strangled. She remains unidentified, as is referred to as "Jane Doe No. 2".

February 10, more skeletal remains were found, this time to a girl whose age is estimated to be around 15 to 17. Due to extreme decomposition, she too remains unidentified, and is named "Jane Doe No. 3"

February 13, 25-year-old Stephanie Murray's body was found in a small pond near the Bonnet Carré Spillway.

February 15, the skeletal remains of another young girl were found, whose identity was never ascertained.

April 2, two sets of skeletal remains were found in the canals, later determined to be of a young woman and a young man. Due to extreme decomposition, neither could be identified, and are referred to as "Jane Doe No. 5" and "John Doe No. 1".

July 3, the body of 32-year-old Michelle Foster, who had gone missing in New Orleans just days prior, was found.

October 19, the skeletal remains of a woman were found in a wooded area near a highway within the limits of Bridge City. She was later identified as 28-year-old Stephanie Brown, who had no prior criminal record.

January 22, 1995, the body of 29-year-old Wanda Ford, an impoverished mother of three, was found in a swamp near the I-55. During her lifetime, she had been arrested multiple times for theft and had a history of drug abuse.

January 23, the body of 39-year-old Sandra Warner was found in St. John the Baptist Parish.

January 25, the remains of 25-year-old Henry Calvin, who had gone missing months earlier from New Orleans, were found.

March 24, police found more skeletal remains under an overpass in Tangipahoa Parish. While the remains were determined to be female, authorities were unable to identify the victim, and she is listed as "Jane Doe No. 6". Her estimated age was between 25 and 35.

April 30, the bodies of two women were found in a swampy area near the I-55. The victims were later identified as Karen Ivester and Sharon Robinson, 30 and 28, respectively. Autopsies determined that Ivester had been strangled, while Robinson had been beaten and strangled, but the presence of water in her lungs indicated that the cause of death had been drowning.

May 6, the body of 39-year-old Sandra Williams, who had been strangled, was found on a boulevard in New Orleans. According to the official investigation, the murders ceased following her death.

Eleven months after the final body was found, police discovered additional skeletal remains on April 8, 1996. She was later identified as 39-year-old Lola Porter, who had gone missing from New Orleans in 1992. Police later interviewed her friends and acquaintances, who stated that she had been cohabiting with a white male who vanished shortly after Porter went missing.

== Investigation ==
In May 1995, a task force was established by the New Orleans Police Department, in conjunction with surrounding parishes and the FBI, in order to solve the killings. During a press conference in August, Chief Richard Pennington announced to the media that the current prime suspect was 33-year-old Victor Gant, a police officer working in New Orleans. During the investigations, it was established that Gant had an intimate relationship with one of the victims, Sharon Robinson.

As a young man, he was a boxer and regularly went to the gym and did weightlifting, and closely matched the 1991 suspect sketch based on "Brenda's" testimony. FBI agent Neil Gallagher later clarified that Gant was a suspect only in Robinson and Ivester's murders, and at present, they had no evidence tying him to any of the other killings. In response, Gant's attorney John Reed said that his client was innocent and the evidence was purely circumstantial.

=== Victor Gant ===
A native of New Orleans, Gant spent his childhood and youth in Algiers, where a number of the victims lived and were abducted from. He became a police officer in February 1980, and while on patrol, Gant would spend a lot of time in red-light districts, where in later years he acquired many acquaintances among pimps, prostitutes and street informants. In the early 1990s, Gant gained a reputation for being corrupt after a number of informants reported that he, along with a few others, were running racketeering operations against pimps and other criminals. It was revealed that during this time, he met Sharon Robinson, who soon became his roommate.

On December 9, 1994, Robinson went to the police to report him for beating her, and according to her statement, Gant punched her in the face and broke her nose. Gant denied the accusation, stating that he had pushed her during an argument, with Robinson hitting her nose on a chair - this was contradicted by her children, who said that they had witnessed him beating their mother. This was backed up by the emergency room doctor, who testified that the woman's injuries were the result of a beating.

In early 1995, a disciplinary panel and hearing to determine Gant's punishment began. During the hearing, members of the disciplinary committee reviewed the testimony of the prosecution's witnesses. The key witness was supposed to be Robinson, but she was found dead on May 1, 1995. According to the investigators, Gant had killed both her and her friend, Karen Ivester, in order to get rid of them.

According to friends and acquaintances of the victims, Gant held a personal grudge against Ivester and had spoken negatively about her on multiple occasions. In order to determine whether he was guilty, Gant was ordered to submit DNA for testing to see whether they could match it to the perpetrator's saliva, which was found on a piece of chewing tobacco found near Ivester's body. The results were inconclusive and no charges were filed against Gant, who was dismissed from the force in August 1996.

Gant appealed his dismissal in 1997. In 1999, the Civil Service Commission reduced the dismissal to a thirty-day suspension and ordered that he be reinstated to his position and all lost wages and benefits restored.

=== Russell Ellwood ===
In addition to Gant, another resident of New Orleans, Russell Ellwood, soon came under police suspicion. A native of Massillon, Ohio, Ellwood moved to New Orleans in 1968 after graduating high school. For the next 30 years, Ellwood lived in squalor because of his drug addiction, had no permanent residence, never married and changed professions often, mostly sticking to photography and cab driving. Owing to his addiction, Ellwood was arrested several times from 1968 to 1998. When not imprisoned, he spent most of his time among fellow vagrants, with acquaintances describing him as an outsider who constantly sought to make get-rich-quick schemes, but consistently failed in his endeavors.

Ellwood first came under police scrutiny in 1994, after he was allegedly found masturbating in his car by police, which had been parked by the road, near where Cheryl Lewis and Delores Mack's bodies were found. A partially undressed Ellwood was forced out of his car and told to show his driver's license. His explanation for stopping was to apparently change the oil and repair the brake pads of his car, and willingly allowed his vehicle to be searched.

Officers found none of the items required for the fixes, not even a flashlight, which would be necessary to perform such repairs in an unlit area at night. Ellwood was questioned regarding the murders and later booked as a suspect. After the task force was formed, Col. Walter T. Gorman of the Jefferson Parish Sheriff's Office and other task force members travelled to Sebring, Florida, on July 23, 1997, so they could question Ellwood, who was living with his elderly father.

Once located, Ellwood was informed of his rights, and within three days gave several statements recorded on tape. During the interrogations, he admitted to frequenting black prostitutes throughout his life, claiming that he knew more than 100 girls, in addition to frequently taking drugs such as heroin, crack cocaine and LSD over the years. The investigators became increasingly suspicious when Ellwood started speaking about having a dream in which he was being questioned about a series of murders and later admitting to frequenting the locations where the bodies were found, but continued to reaffirm his innocence.

On August 4, 1997, just days after the interrogations were completed, Ellwood was arrested for buying cocaine from an undercover police officer at his home in Sebring. As a result, he was convicted and sentenced to spend 85 days in the county jail. According to his cellmates, Ellwood implicated himself in the prostitute killings back in New Orleans and its various suburbs. One of them, Stan Hill, contacted the county prosecutor's office and claimed that Ellwood had described to him in detail how he had driven the women to outlying areas of the city, offering them large quantities of drugs that caused overdoses, then strangled and dumped their bodies.

A number of other inmates witnessed a fight between Ellwood and another inmate, during which he allegedly said "Yeah, I killed that nigger bitch. I'll kill you too." Another inmate, Stephen Michael Busser, also told police that Ellwood had boasted of being wanted for more than 60 murders within the state of Louisiana, and had even described to him in detail one of them.

On August 13, 1997, The Howard Stern Show received a call from a man who identified himself as "Clay". During the conversation with host Howard Stern, which was broadcast live, "Clay" described details for more than 12 murders and gave some details about his background, indicating that he was a white resident of New Orleans. The interview with the potential serial killer caused massive media publicity, and FBI agents allegedly went to the studio and seized audio recordings of the call to establish the caller's location and possible identity. In the following years, the credibility of this incident was questioned, as the program regularly received numerous calls from people who claimed to have done terrible things, with some alleging that Stern himself faked the call to boost his ratings. Ellwood was still incarcerated on August 13, 1997, so he may have been incarcerated at the time of the phone call.

After his release, Ellwood returned to Canton to live with his brother, who offered him a high-paying job. Based on Hill's testimony, the task force tracked him down and re-interviewed in the presence of Ron Camden, a 27-year veteran of the Cincinnati Police Department's Homicide Unit. During interrogation, Ellwood initially denied making any such statements to the inmates, but after an audio tape of Hill's testimony was played, he admitted that he had boasted to Hill.

Camden later testified that Ellwood also confessed to him that he had killed a black girl, whose corpse he had dumped in the canal. No recording of this confession was taken, and Ellwood later denied ever confessing to such a murder to Camden. Ellwood later claimed that a mental illness had caused him to boast, demanding that the interrogations cease and he be allowed to return to New Orleans to see his attorney and be provided with treatment. This request was denied, whereupon Ellwood confessed to killing Lewis and Mack, but refused to be audiotaped and soon after began denying that he had confessed.

Eventually, Ellwood was released again. In January 1998, he returned to New Orleans. On January 16, he was stopped by traffic cops for speeding and was scheduled to appear in court, but failed to appear on time and was arrested for contempt of court. Ellwood was eventually convicted and ordered to spend 120 days behind bars. While incarcerated, authorities charged him with the murders of Lewis and Mack on March 4, 1998.

==== Ellwood's trial ====
The trial began on June 8, 1999, in Lafayette. During the proceedings, a number of Ellwood's former cellmates and prostitutes testified as prosecution witnesses. The cellmate claimed that he had confessed to the killings. The prostitutes claimed that he had assaulted them. Diane Gilliam, a former prostitute, told the court that she had known Ellwood since the early 1990s and had dated him periodically. She testified that in 1992, during a date, Ellwood, while under the influence of drugs, assaulted, beat and strangled her into unconsciousness. Gilliam stated that she woke up to find herself in a pool of blood in an unfamiliar, wooded area, where a passing motorist found her by chance and sheltered her at the motel where he was staying. She said that she did not report the incident, due to being a prostitute with a criminal record.

Navassa Richmond, a former stripper and prostitute, testified that she had also been beaten and assaulted twice by a drug-crazed Ellwood, during which he also attempted to strangle her. Janie Stokes, a former prostitute, told the court that she first met him in either 1992 or 1993 at Snell's gas station in Marrero, when he was working as a cab driver. Stokes stated Ellwood bought her lunch and treated her nicely before driving her to his home, where he suggested that they use cocaine. After doing drugs together, Ellwood beat her, but she managed to flee. The witness, like Gilliam, did not report the incident because she was a drug addict.

Antoinette Rainey, who worked as a drug dealer in New Orleans, also appeared as a witness for the prosecution, testifying that Ellwood was a regular customer. She recounted an incident in which Ellwood forced her into his car at gunpoint, then drove her to an underpass where he beat, raped and robbed her, threatening to kill her during the ordeal. Rainey was able to escape, but did not report the attack due to her criminal lifestyle.

Three witnesses testified that they had seen the defendant with Cheryl Lewis shortly before her disappearance. According to the testimony of Denise Sanders, who was Lewis' best friend, she had seen her with Ellwood three days prior, who was out driving his cab. Sanders admitted to withholding this information, because she was a drug dealer. The second witness, Antoinette Holmes, who lived near Lewis, testified to seeing her at the Time Saver restaurant in Bridge City two weeks before she was reported missing, standing between two parked cars and talking to a cab driver. She then identified Ellwood as the driver.

Weinweir Henry, Lewis' cousin, stated that she last saw her at a hotel in Avondale with a man, who she identified as Ellwood. According to her, Lewis had told Henry that she and Ellwood were on their way to a suburb of New Orleans, where her body was later found. Henry testified that she had not given the police this information, as she was wanted for petty offenses at the time.

Ellwood himself denied knowing any of the victims or committing any murders, although he could not provide an alibi. Cheryl Lewis' mother admitted that her daughter was a drug addict and a prostitute, but said that she had never seen Ellwood with her daughter before. His attorneys argued that Ellwood was not in New Orleans at the time of the murders, claiming that he had been in Ohio with some relatives.

Ellwood was known for keeping extensive amounts of documents that indicate his whereabouts, but the receipts regarding his supposed presence in Ohio for February 1993 had mysteriously disappeared. Ellwood's attorneys then filed a motion for a polygraph test to be performed on Sue Rushing, then-head of the task force, which was granted. During the test, Rushing was unable to answer a series of questions regarding the missing receipts, but the result was inconclusive, casting doubt on Ellwood's guilt.

Ultimately, the murder charge for Delores Mack was dropped. Ellwood was found guilty of killing Cheryl Lewis and was sentenced to life imprisonment without parole on August 17, 1999. A deputy who worked in the department later attempted to sue them for allegedly firing him for revealing that Rushing had destroyed crucial evidence. His appeal was rejected due to lack of evidence.

== Aftermath ==
As of November 2021, all of the murders, aside from that of Cheryl Lewis, remain unsolved. Ellwood remains a suspect in several of the killings, but no charges have been filed against him. Gant left New Orleans after his discharge from law enforcement and moved to Atlanta, Georgia, where he presumably still lives today. In a 2016 interview with HuffPost, Major C.J. Destor of the St. John the Baptist Parish Sheriff's Office confirmed that Gant is still on the suspect list.

Ellwood died at Angola State Prison in Angola, Louisiana, in 2014.

== See also ==
- List of serial killers in the United States

== Bibliography ==
- Newton, Michael (October 1, 2009). The Encyclopedia of Unsolved Crimes. Checkmark Books. ISBN 978-0816078196.
