= Russell S. Bonds =

Civil war author and attorney

Russell S. Bonds is a corporate attorney and an author of military history, specializing in the Civil War.

== Career ==
Bonds received a law degree magna cum laude from the University of Georgia, where he served as an editor of the Georgia Law Review. He also studied architecture at Georgia Tech.

His book Stealing the General won the 2007 Richard Barksdale Harwell Award for the best Civil War book of the year.

He has also written numerous articles for the Wall Street Journal and other magazines and newspapers.

== Selected publications ==
- Stealing the General: The Great Locomotive Chase and the First Medal of Honor. Yardley, Pa: Westholme, 2007. ISBN 1594160333
- War Like the Thunderbolt: The Battle and Burning of Atlanta. Yardley, Pa: Westholme, 2009. ISBN 9781594161001
