= Russell J. Weintraub =

American lawyer

Russell J. Weintraub (1929–2012) was an American lawyer, formerly the Ben H. and Kitty King Powell Emeritus Chair in Business and Commercial Law Professor at University of Texas at Austin, and also a published author.

He was instrumental in hiring Elizabeth Warren for University of Texas at Austin Law School when he saw her teaching at University of Houston Law School. This hiring decision is believed to have catapulted Warren's career into the top echelon of American Law.

He earned degrees from New York University and Harvard Law School.
