= Russell Ward =

Russell Ward may refer to:

- Russell Ward (racing driver) (born 1992), American racing driver
- Russell Ward (skeleton racer) (born 1982), New Zealand male skeleton racer

== See also ==
- Russel Ward (1914–1995), Australian historian
- Ward Russell, American photographer and cinematographer
