= Russell Rowe (footballer) =

Australian rules footballer

Personal information
- Full name: Russell Rowe
- Born: 21 January 1954 (age 72)
- Original team: Caulfield
- Height: 179 cm (5 ft 10 in)
- Weight: 81 kg (179 lb)

Playing career^{1}
Years	Club	Games (Goals)
1980	Melbourne	11 (15)
- ^{1} Playing statistics correct to the end of 1980.

Russell Rowe (born 21 January 1954) is a former Australian rules footballer who played with Melbourne in the Victorian Football League (VFL).
