= Russell Mills =

Russell Mills may refer to:

- Russell Mills (artist) (born 1952), British artist
- Russell Mills (architect) (1892–1959), American architect
- Russell Mills (publisher) (born 1944), Canadian journalist and publisher
