= Russell Anderson (disambiguation) =

Russ or Russell Anderson may refer to:

- Russ Anderson (born 1955), American ice hockey player in the NHL
- Russ Anderson (actor), American actor
- Russell Anderson (born 1978), Scottish footballer
- Russell A. Anderson (1942–2020), American judge
- Russell Anderson (politician) (born 1951), Australian politician
- Russell Anderson (field hockey) (born 1984), Scottish field hockey player
