= Russell Clark =

Russell Clark may refer to:

- Russell Charles Clark (1878–1964), Prince Edward Island politician
- Russell Gentry Clark (1925–2003), United States federal judge
- R. Inslee Clark Jr. (1935–1999), United States educator, administrator
- Russell Clark (criminal) (1898–1968), American thief, bank robber and prison escapee
- Russell Clark (artist) (1905–1966), New Zealand artist
- Russell Clark, CEO Peel Thunder Football Club
