= Russell Adams =

Russell Adams may refer to:

- Russell L. Adams (born 1930), American author and professor
- Russell Adams Sears (1869–1932), American mayor
