= Russell Keanini =

American mechanical engineer

- Occupations: Mechanical engineer, mathematician, physicist, and academic

Academic background
- Education: Colorado School of Mines; University of Colorado Denver; University of California at Berkeley
- Thesis: Numerical and analytical studies of phase change processes (1992)

Academic work
- Institutions: University of North Carolina at Charlotte

Russell Keanini is an American mechanical engineer, mathematician, physicist, and academic. He is a professor of Mechanical Engineering and Engineering Science at the William States Lee College of Engineering of the University of North Carolina at Charlotte. He is the recipient of the 2020 Kirk Bryan Award for his contributions to the field of Quaternary geology.

Keanini's research is focused on molecular hydrodynamics, fluid dynamics, applied math, and statistical mechanics, with a primary interest in stochastic processes, applications of Green's function methods, and the utilization of fluid mechanics. In 1998, he published an online set of course notes in Advanced Viscous Flow which corresponded to expanded homework and exam problems developed by Stephen Morris at UC Berkeley.

== Education and early career ==
Keanini earned his Baccalaureate degree in Chemical Engineering from the Colorado School of Mines in 1983 and pursued a Master's in Mechanical Engineering from the University of Colorado Denver in 1987. He served as a Graduate Student Researcher at the National Aeronautics and Space Administration (NASA) Ames Research Center from 1988 to 1989 and was a Member of the US Navy from 1984 to 1990. In 1992, he received his Ph.D. in Mechanical Engineering from the University of California at Berkeley with a thesis titled "Numerical and analytical studies of phase change processes".

== Career ==
Following his Ph.D., Keanini began his academic career as an assistant professor of Mechanical Engineering in 1992 at the University of North Carolina at Charlotte and was promoted to associate professor in 1998. Since 2007, he has been serving as a professor of Mechanical Engineering and Engineering Science at the William States Lee College of Engineering of the University of North Carolina Charlotte.

At the NASA Marshall Space Flight Center, Keanini focused on studying altitude-dependent turbulent boundary layer separation and random rocket dynamics, particularly in Saturn-V-scale rockets. During his time at the Alcoa Technical Center in Pittsburgh, he developed theoretical and inverse methods for predicting and monitoring heat transfer during high-speed metal rolling processes. Additionally, while working at the Center for Marine Science Research at UNC Wilmington, he created a predictive model to analyze circulation-driven nutrient/mass transfer in chicken embryos' bones. Moreover, at the Center for Precision Metrology, UNC Charlotte, he modeled high-precision packed-bed thermal attenuators/controllers and applied PIV velocimetry to vibratory finishing processes.

== Research ==
Keanini's research interests span the fields of fundamental fluid physics and math problems, with a particular interest in physical, analytical, and computational modeling of molecular dynamics in polar and non-polar liquids.

=== Physical modeling of single molecule dynamics in nonpolar liquids ===
Keanini's research focused on the liquid state and the dynamics of single molecules occurring on timescales ranging from microseconds to femtoseconds (10^{−6} to 10^{−15}). Employing nonequilibrium statistical and quantum mechanical arguments, he revealed two significant findings: the emergence of viscosity and the occurrence of self-diffusive molecular hopping driven by phonons in liquids. This work provided an explanation of these phenomena. Furthermore, he developed and tested a self-consistent Langevin model for describing the dynamics of single molecules in the liquid state.

=== Bootstrap technique for (stochastically) estimating Green's function ===
Keanini has worked on the application of Green's function and introduced a new technique for solving physical problems governed by linear partial differential equations, including Schrödinger's equation (quantum mechanics), Maxwell's equations (classical electromagnetism), and the linearized Navier-Stokes equations (fluid mechanics). He addressed the central limitation associated with Green's function techniques by employing stochastic processes, specifically random walkers, to estimate highly accurate and non-problem-specific Green functions. At the beginning of the project, he presented three stochastic-based methods for solving unsteady scalar transport problems in bounded, single-phase domains, encompassing Dirichlet, Neumann, and/or mixed initial boundary value problems. He then proposed a framework that integrated Green's function (GF) methods with techniques from the theory of stochastic processes which enabled the resolution of nonlinear evolution problems.

=== Development of an accessible, dynamically equivalent molecular hydrodynamic analog ===
Keanini carried out a series of experimental and theoretical studies at UNC Charlotte to develop experimentally accessible analogs of liquid state molecular hydrodynamic systems and demonstrated that vibrated beds of high restitution (ceramic) grains – from short interparticle collision time and length scales to long, multiparticle flow scales – are dynamically equivalent to dense (liquid state) molecular hydrodynamic system. He explored the potential and use of particle image velocimetry (PIV) as a diagnostic tool for studying fundamental features associated with vibrational finishing and for developing system-independent control strategies. In addition, he presented a technique to measure the kinematic viscosity of granular flows using a low Reynolds number cylinder drag experiment.

=== Other contributions ===
Keanini has also contributed towards the physical modeling of environmentally-driven fracture processes in rocks and the development of computational and theoretical, direct and inverse models of various materials processing operations. Since 1992, his research has focused on the analytical modeling of fluid flow problems, including secondary streaming flow, thermocapillary and buoyancy driven flow in fluid collars, linear and nonlinear waves on cylindrical menisci, supersonic and hypersonic flows in various geometries, shock train evolution in supersonic nozzles, and turbulent boundary layer separation in rocket nozzles as well as mass and heat transfer problems. He also worked on computational optimization for planning noninvasive cryosurgeries.

== Awards and honors ==
- 2020 – Kirk Bryan Award, Geological Society of America

== Selected articles ==
- Ortega, Joseph K.E.; Zehr, Edwin G.; Keanini, Russell G. (September 1989). "In vivo creep and stress relaxation experiments to determine the wall extensibility and yield threshold for the sporangiophores of phycomyces". Biophysical Journal. 56 (3): 465–475. Bibcode:1989BpJ....56..465O. doi:10.1016/S0006-3495(89)82694-3. PMC 1280500. PMID 19431745.
- Keanini, R. G.; Rubinsky, B. (1990). "Plasma arc welding under normal and zero gravity". Welding Journal. 69 (6): 41–50.
- Keanini, R. G.; Rubinsky, B. (1 November 1992). "Optimization of Multiprobe Cryosurgery". Journal of Heat Transfer. 114 (4): 796–801. doi:10.1115/1.2911885.
- Keanini, Russell G.; Rubinsky, Boris (September 1993). "Three-dimensional simulation of the plasma arc welding process". International Journal of Heat and Mass Transfer. 36 (13): 3283–3298. Bibcode:1993IJHMT..36.3283K. doi:10.1016/0017-9310(93)90011-T.
- Ling, Xianwu; Keanini, Russell G.; Cherukuri, H. P. (7 March 2003). "A non-iterative finite element method for inverse heat conduction problems". International Journal for Numerical Methods in Engineering. 56 (9): 1315–1334. Bibcode:2003IJNME..56.1315L. doi:10.1002/nme.614. S2CID 123075946.
- Eppes, Martha-Cary; Keanini, Russell (June 2017). "Mechanical weathering and rock erosion by climate-dependent subcritical cracking". Reviews of Geophysics. 55 (2): 470–508. Bibcode:2017RvGeo..55..470E. doi:10.1002/2017RG000557. S2CID 134803203.
