= Russell Fernald =

Russell D. Fernald is an American neuroscientist/neuroethologist, currently on the Biology faculty at Stanford University. Fernald is known for his interdisciplinary work based on fieldwork and subsequent neuroethological analysis of an African cichlid fish that he has shown to be a useful and novel model organism. His research spans several domains: 1) in the visual system including the discovery of rod photoreceptor stem cells, circadian renewal of photoreceptor opsins and mechanisms of crystalline lens focus (Rank Prize); 2) In social control of reproductive behavior: social regulation of reproduction via gonadotropin releasing hormones through specific brain circuitry; 3) Cognitive skills that have evolved to regulate social status.

== Early life ==
Russ Fernald was born in Chuquicamata, Chile to American parents, Catherine and Russell G. Fernald where his father was a mining engineer, working at the Anaconda Company open pit mine.

Fernald returned to the U.S. when he was ~3 and grew up in a western suburb of Chicago where he attended public schools. He was attracted to biology by foraging in local swamps and was one of a handful of his high school classmates who went to college.

== Career ==
Fernald attended Swarthmore College where he received his B.S. in electrical engineering in 1963. He then completed his Ph.D. in biophysics from the University of Pennsylvania in 1968 where he worked with Professor George Gerstein. He was supported by the Ford Foundation and studied the neurobiology of the cat cochlear nucleus using single cell recording and modeling the data. In 1969, he moved to Munich, Germany where he worked as a postdoctoral fellow at the Max-Planck für Psychiatrie in Munich with Dr. O. Creutzfeldt, until 1971. In this position, together with Ronald Chase, he developed a novel technique for aligning and focusing the eyes of experimental animals. In 1971 Fernald moved to the Max-Planck Institute for Behavioral Physiology where he worked with Nobel Laureate, Dr. Konrad Lorenz in Seewiesen, Germany. His research was on quantitative behavioral analyses of bird and fish behavior and he began African field work on cichlid fish during that time. He then returned to the US where he joined the faculty of the University of Oregon (1976–1990), rising through the ranks to full professor and becoming the director of the Neuroscience Institute. During this time, he was an NIH Fogarty Senior International Fellow at the Medical Research Council in London (1985–86). In 1990, Fernald moved to Stanford where he has since held numerous titles and received several awards, including a Hilgard Visiting Professor, 1987–88; Professor of Psychology, 1990–2004, Professor of Biology, Stanford University 2004-; Benjamin Scott Crocker Professor, Stanford University, 2004-; Javits Investigator Award, NINDS 1999–2006; Bing Prize for Innovation in Undergraduate teaching, 1996–1999; Cox Medal for Fostering Undergraduate Research, 1998; Dinkelspiel Prize for Outstanding Contributions to Undergraduate Education, 2000; Bass University Fellow in Undergraduate Education, 2003–2013.

He was awarded the Rank Prize in Vision/Opto-electronics, 2004; Elected, American Academy of Arts and Sciences, 2011 and presented numerous named lectures including the Futterman Memorial Lecture, University of Washington, 2009; Forbes Lectures, Marine Biological Laboratory, Woods Hole, 2011; Marsden Lecture, McGill University, Montreal, 2013; Matarazzo Lecture, Oregon Health Sciences Institute, Portland, 2013. He has served as Executive Editor, Experimental Eye Research, 1991–2000; Editorial Board, Brain, Behavior and Evolution, 1998–2007; Advisory Board, Canadian Institute for Advanced Research, 2008–2015; Advisory Board, Max Planck Institute for Brain Research, Frankfurt, 2011–present; Reviewing Editor, e-Life, 2012–present.

== Research ==
In early work, Fernald asked how fish maintain excellent visual acuity despite rapid eye growth. He showed eyes grow through expansion and cell addition at the eye's margins but that rod photoreceptors arise from precursor stem cells. Fernald next asked how fish lens quality was preserved during growth, identifying specific mechanisms, sharing the Rank Prize for the discovery. Fernald also showed that retinal opsin production was regulated via a circadian rhythm, since shown to be the case in all vertebrates. Fernald also did research on eye evolution, showing that photoreceptor proteins have an ancient origin predating vision while lens proteins have arisen many times from different sources in different animal lineages.

In his research on the control of reproduction, Fernald's research showed neurons containing gonadotropin releasing hormone (GnRH) changed size in response to an animal's social status and his group were the first to find the gene encoding (GnRH) in cold-blooded vertebrates. He also found a previously unknown second GnRH gene in humans and other primates. To be effective, GnRH must be delivered in a pulsatile fashion, yet no known mechanism synchronized the firing of these neurons, but Fernald recently showed this results from their connection via gap junctions.

In his research, Fernald collected definitive evidence that social behavior can change the brain, including regulation of numerous receptors, identifying a social calculus used during behavioral interactions. He identified an attention hierarchy in fish that maintains social systems and more recently that fish can construct a logical linear hierarchy from paired observations to perform transitive inference just as do primates, thereby identifying cognitive skills required for social systems across vertebrates. Using the CRISPR technique, his group has shown that a single gene controls reproduction in the cichlid fish. He has published several review articles describing the search for the social brain. among his 220 papers and book chapters.
