= Russell Ellen =

Australian rules footballer

Personal information
- Full name: Russell P. Ellen
- Born: 8 February 1954 (age 72)
- Original team: Marnoo
- Height: 191 cm (6 ft 3 in)
- Weight: 89 kg (196 lb)
- Position: Ruck

Playing career^{1}
Years	Club	Games (Goals)
1973–77	Essendon	35 (5)
1978–83	West Perth	108 (57)
- ^{1} Playing statistics correct to the end of 1977.

Russell Ellen (born 8 February 1954) is a former Australian rules footballer who played with Essendon in the Victorian Football League (VFL). Ellen later played for West Perth in the West Australian Football League (WAFL), Wembley in the Western Australian Amateur Football League, his old team Marnoo in the Lexton Football League, South Broken Hill in the Broken Hill Football League, and finally in Perth's Sunday Football League.
