= Russell (surname) =

- Language: Anglo-Norman

Origin
- Meaning: red, or a toponymic
- Region of origin: France, Ireland, Scotland, England

Other names
- Variant forms: Rosel; Rousel; Russel; Rossell; Roussel;

Russell is a surname of Anglo-Norman origin, also with spellings Rosel, Rousel, Roussel, Russel or Rossell. The origin of the name has historically been subject to disagreement, with two distinct origins proposed. Early genealogists traced the Russel/Russell family of Kingston Russel from Anglo-Norman landholders bearing the toponymic surname 'de Rosel' or 'du Rozel', deriving from Rosel, Calvados, Normandy (not, as has also been claimed, Le Rozel, Manche). However, J. Horace Round observed that these flawed pedigrees erroneously linked toponymic-bearing men with unrelated men who instead bore the Anglo-Norman nickname rus[s]el (represented in contemporary Latin documents as Rosellus), given to men with red hair. This nickname was a diminutive of the Norman-French rus (Old French ros, Modern French roux), meaning 'red', and was also an archaic name for the red fox, which in turn borrowed from Old Norse rossel, "red-haired", from Old Norse ros "red hair color" and the suffix -el. Round concluded "there is no reason to suppose that the surname Russell was territorial at all," and surname dictionaries have preferred to derive the surname from the nickname. Dictionaries also state that the English name Rufus originally meant "red haired".

People with surname Russell include:

== A ==
- Aaron Russell (born 1993), American volleyball player
- Adam Russell (disambiguation), several people
- Addie Jenne Russell, American politician
- Addison Russell (born 1994), American baseball player
- Addison Peale Russell (1826–1912), American author
- Ajani Russell, American skateboarder and actress
- Albert Russell (director) (1890–1929), American filmmaker
- Albert Russell, Lord Russell (1884–1975), Scottish politician
- Alec Russell, English journalist
- Alex Russell (disambiguation), several people
- Alexander Russell (disambiguation), several people
- Alexei Maxim Russell (born 1976), Canadian writer
- Alfred Russell (disambiguation), several people
- Alice Russell (singer) (born 1975), English singer
- Alice B. Russell (1892–1984), American actress
- Allan Russell (born 1980), Scottish footballer
- Allen Russell (1893–1972), American baseball player
- Alys Russell (née Pearsall Smith, 1867–1951), American-born English Quaker relief organiser; first wife of Bertrand Russell
- Andre Russell (born 1988), Jamaican cricketer
- Andrea Russell, American chemist and professor
- Andrew Russell (disambiguation), several people
- Andy Russell (disambiguation), several people
- Angela Russell (disambiguation), several people
- Anna Russell (1911–2006), English–Canadian singer and comedian
- Anna Russell (botanist) (1807–1876), British botanist
- Anna Russell, Duchess of Bedford (1783–1857), Lady of the Bedchamber to Queen Victoria
- Anne Russell (judge) (born 1940), Canadian judge
- Anne Russell (artist), (1781–1857), English pastellist
- Anne Russell, Countess of Warwick (1548 or 1549–1604), Lady-in-waiting to Queen Elizabeth I
- Anthony Russell (disambiguation), several people
- Archibald Russell (disambiguation), several people
- Arthur Russell (disambiguation), several people
- Austin Lee Russell (born 1982), American television personality and businessman known as Chumlee

== B ==
- Barry Russell (1934–1998), Australian rugby league footballer
- Barry Russell (Cronulla) (born 1965), Australian rugby league footballer active 1985–1991
- Belinda Russell (born c.1978), Australian newsreader
- Benjamin Russell (disambiguation), several people
- Bertrand Russell (1872–1970), British polymath
- Betsy Russell (born 1963), American actress
- Bibi Russell (born 1950), Bangladeshi model and fashion designer
- Bill Russell (disambiguation), also Billy Russell, several people
- Bing Russell (1926–2003), American actor
- Bob Russell (disambiguation), also Bobby Russell, several people
- Bourn Russell (1794–1880), British/Australian mariner, pastoralist, businessman and politician
- Brady Russell (born 1998), American football player
- Brenda Russell (born 1949), American musician
- Brian Russell (born 1978), American football player
- Brian Russell (priest) (born 1950), British Anglican priest
- Bruce Russell (disambiguation), several people
- Bryan Russell (born 1981), American record producer
- Bryon Russell (born 1970), American basketball player
- Byron Russell (1884–1963), Irish actor

== C ==
- Callum Russell (born 1996), British Para-cyclist
- Calvin Russell (American football) (born 1983), American football player
- Calvin Russell (musician) (1948–2011), American singer-songwriter and guitarist
- Cam Russell (born 1969), Canadian hockey player
- Cameron Russell (born 1987), American fashion model
- Campy Russell (born 1952), American basketball player
- Carl Parcher Russell (born 1984), American historian and ecologist
- Carl Ray Russell (born 1957), American politician
- Caroline Russell (born 1962), British politician
- Carolyn Russell (born 1974), Canadian squash player
- Catherine Russell (disambiguation), several people
- Cazzie Russell (born 1944), American basketball player
- Chapelle Russell (born 1997), American football player
- Charles Russell (disambiguation), several people
- Charlie Russell (disambiguation), several people
- Chris Russell (born 1989), English cricketer
- Chris J. Russell (born 1980), American jockey
- Christine Russell (born 1945), British politician
- Christopher T. Russell (born 1943), American physicist
- Chuck Russell (1952–2026), American film director, producer, screenwriter and actor
- Clarence D. Russell (1895–1963), American cartoonist
- Clarence W. Russell (died 1919), American college sports coach
- Clay Milner Russell (born 1999), English actor
- Clive Russell (born 1945), Scottish actor
- Colin Russell (disambiguation), several people
- Connie Russell (1923–1990), American singer and actress
- Conrad Russell (letter writer) (1878–1947), English letter writer
- Conrad Russell, 5th Earl Russell (1937–2004), British historian and politician
- Corinne Russell (born 1963), English model
- Craig Russell (disambiguation), several people

== D ==
- D'Angelo Russell (born 1996), American basketball player
- Dale Russell (1937–2019), American-Canadian geologist and palaeontologist
- Damien Russell (born 1970), American football player
- Daniel Russell (disambiguation), also Dan or Danny Russell, several people
- Danielle Rose Russell (born 1999), American actress
- Darrell Russell (disambiguation), several people
- David Russell (disambiguation), also Dave Russell, several people
- Davy Russell (born 1979), Irish jockey
- Davy Russell (politician), Scottish politician
- Dean Russell (born 1976), American politician
- Diana Russell (disambiguation), several people
- Dick Russell (author), American writer
- Donald Russell (disambiguation), several people
- Dontavius Russell (born 1995), American football player
- Dora Russell (née Black, 1894–1986), British author, feminist and socialist campaigner, second wife of Bertrand Russell
- Doug Russell (American football) (1911–1995), American football player
- Doug Russell (swimmer) (born 1946), American swimmer
- Dudley Russell (1896–1978), British Indian Army general in World War II
- Dwayne Russell (born 1965), Australian rules footballer and commentator

== E ==
- Ebenezer Russell (1747–1836), New York politician
- Edith Finch Russell (1900–1978), American writer and biographer, fourth wife of Bertrand Russell
- Edward Russell (disambiguation), several people
- Elam W. Russell Sr. (1828–1897), American politician and Missouri state representative
- Elizabeth Russell (disambiguation), several people
- Eric Russell (disambiguation), several people
- Erica Russell (born 1951), New Zealand-born film animator
- Erk Russell (1926–2006), American athlete and coach
- Ernestine Russell (1938–2026), Canadian gymnast and American college gymnastics coach
- Ethan Russell (born 1945), American photographer and author
- Evangeline Russell (1902–1966), American actress

== F ==
- Fatts Russell (born 1988), American basketball player
- Findlay E. Russell (1919–2011), American physician and toxicologist
- Finn Russell (born 1992), Scottish rugby union player
- Francis Russell (disambiguation), several people
- Frank Russell (disambiguation), several people
- Frederick Russell (disambiguation), several people

== G ==
- Gail Russell (1924–1961), American actress
- Gareth Russell (author), British historian and author
- Gareth Russell (musician), Scottish musician
- Gary Russell (disambiguation), several people
- Geoffrey Russell, 4th Baron Ampthill (1921–2011), British peer
- George Russell (racing driver) (born 1998) British Formula One driver
- Gerald Russell (1928–2018), British psychiatrist
- Gerald F. Russell (1916–2014), United States Marine Corps officer
- Gerald Walter Russell (1850–1928), Royal Navy admiral
- Gerard Russell (diplomat), British diplomat and writer
- Gerard Russell (politician) (1620–1682), English politician
- Gilbert Russell (disambiguation), several people
- Gordon Russell (disambiguation), several people
- Graham Russell (born 1950), English musician
- Grayson Russell (born 1998), American actor
- Green Pinckney Russell (1861–1939), American school administrator and teacher
- Guy Russell (1898–1977), Royal Navy admiral
- Guy Russell (footballer) (born 1967), English football player and manager

== H ==
- Harold Russell (1914–2002), American World War II veteran, amputee, and actor
- Harold Russell (politician) (1871–1938), New Zealand farmer, sportsman, and politician
- Harry Russell (disambiguation), several people
- Harvey C. Russell Jr. (1918–1998), American businessmen
- Harvey C. Russell Sr. (1883–1949), American educator, and academic administrator
- Hastings Russell, 12th Duke of Bedford (1888–1953), British peer
- Helen Cary Russell (1870–1946), American clubwoman, social leader, and magazine editor
- Henry Russell (disambiguation), several people
- Herbrand Russell, 11th Duke of Bedford (1858–1940), British politician and peer
- Honey Russell (1902–1973), American basketball player and coach

== I ==
- Ian Russell (disambiguation), several people
- Ivan Russell (born 1952), Australian rules footballer

== J ==
- Jack Russell (disambiguation), several people
- JaMarcus Russell (born 1985), American football player
- James Russell (disambiguation) (includes Jim)
- Jane Russell (1921–2011), American actress
- Jason Russell (born 1978), American director and human rights activist
- Jay Russell (born 1960), American filmmaker
- Jay Russell (writer) (born 1961), American author
- Jeannie Russell (born 1950), American actress
- Jeff Russell (born 1961), American baseball player and manager
- Jeffrey Burton Russell (1934–2023), American historian and religious scholar
- Jenna Russell (born 1967), English actress and singer
- Jennifer Russell (lacrosse), American lacrosse player
- Jennifer Russell (physician), Canadian physician and health official
- Jennifer Russell (tennis) (born 1978), American tennis player
- Jennifer Russell (translator), Danish translator
- Jeremiah Russell (1786–1867), American politician from New York
- Jeremiah Russell (Minnesota politician) (1809–1885), American territorial legislator
- Jesse Russell (born 1948), American inventor
- Jimmy Russell (1878–1925), Australian rules footballer
- Jimmy Russell (rugby league), British rugby league footballer
- J. J. Russell (born 1998), American football player
- Jo Russell (born 1970), British radio presenter
- Joan Russell (1888-19??), English artist
- Joe Russell (disambiguation), several people
- Joellen Louise Russell (born 1970), oceanographer and climate scientist
- John Russell (disambiguation), several people
- Johnny Russell (disambiguation), several people
- Jon Russell (disambiguation), several people
- Jonathan Russell (disambiguation), several people
- Jordan Russell (born 1986), Australian rules footballer
- Joseph Russell (disambiguation), several people
- Jotham Russell (born 2003), Australian American football player
- Julia Russell (born 1975), South African Olympic swimmer

== K ==
- Kane Russell (born 1992), New Zealand field hockey player
- Karen Russell (born 1981), American author
- Kate Russell (disambiguation), several people
- Katherine Russell (disambiguation), several people
- Kathleen Russell (athlete) (1927–1969), Jamaican sprinter
- Kathleen Russell (swimmer) (1912–1992), South African swimmer
- Keelon Russell (born 2007), American football player
- Keith Russell (disambiguation), several people
- KeiVarae Russell (born 1993), American football player
- Ken Russell (1927–2011), British film director
- Kenneth Russell (disambiguation), several people
- Kent Russell, American author
- Keri Russell (born 1976), American actress
- Kevin Russell (footballer) (born 1966), English footballer
- Kevin Russell (musician) (born 1964), German singer
- Kimberly Russell (born 1964), American actress
- Kirkland Russell, Bahamian politician
- Kris Russell (born 1987), Canadian ice hockey player
- Kurt Russell (born 1951), American actor

== L ==
- Lafayette Russell (1904–1978), American football player
- Lance Russell (1926–2017), American sports broadcaster and commentator
- Larry Russell (1913–1954), American composer
- Larry Russell (bassist) (born 1950), American musician
- Lee Russell (disambiguation), several people
- Leon Russell (1942–2016), American musician and songwriter
- Leonard Russell (disambiguation), several people
- Leroy "Junior" Russell (born 1987), known as Tommy Lee Sparta, Jamaican dancehall musician
- Lewis Russell (1889–1961), American actor
- Liane Russell (1923–2019), American geneticist
- Lillian Russell (1860/1861–1922), American vaudeville actress and singer
- Lindsey Russell, English television presenter
- Lloyd Russell (1913–1968), American athlete and college sports coach
- Lucy Russell (actress) (born 1972), British actress
- Lucy Russell, Countess of Bedford (1580–1627), English patron of the arts
- Luis Russell (1902–1963), Panamanian jazz pianist
- Lynne Russell (born 1946), American journalist and author

== M ==
- Malinda Russell (born c. 1812), African-American cookbook writer
- Mariya Russell (born c. 1989), American chef and Michelin star restaurateur
- Margaret Russell, American design journalist
- Mark Russell (disambiguation), several people
- Martha M. Russell (1867–1961), American nurse in World War I
- Mary Russell (disambiguation), several people
- Marzuk Russell (born 1973), Bangladeshi lyricist, poet, model, and actor
- Matthew Russell (disambiguation), also Matt Russell, several people
- Mercedes Russell (born 1995), American basketball player
- Mia'Kate Russell, Australian filmmaker, writer-director of Penny Lane Is Dead (2025)
- Michael Russell (disambiguation), several people
- Micho Russell (1915–1994), Irish musician and author
- Mickey Russell, American football player
- Mike Russell (disambiguation), several people
- Moses Russell (1888–1946), Welsh international footballer
- Mungo Russell (merchant) (died 1591), Scottish textile merchant and paper entrepreneur

== N ==
- Naomi Russell (born 1990), Australian gymnast
- Newton Russell (1927–2013), American politician
- Nicholas Russell, 6th Earl Russell (1968–2014), British politician
- Nick Russell (disambiguation), several people
- Nipsey Russell (1918–2005), American comedian
- Norman Russell (1943-2026), British clergyman

== O ==
- Odo Russell, 1st Baron Ampthill (1829–1884), British diplomat
- Olive Nelson Russell (1905–1989), American composer, organist and pianist

== P ==
- P. Craig Russell (born 1951), American comic writer, artist, and illustrator
- Pat Russell (1923–2021), American community activist and politician
- Patricia Russell, Countess Russell (1910–2004), British philosopher, third wife of Bertrand Russell
- Patrick Russell (disambiguation), several people
- Patti Russell (fl. 1919–1929), Australian soprano
- Paul Russell (disambiguation), several people
- Pee Wee Russell (1906–1969), American jazz musician
- Percy Joseph Russell (1861–1946), Australian politician and mayor
- Mrs Percy Russell (1870–1938), Australian Red Cross worker
- Peter Russell (disambiguation), several people
- Philip Russell (disambiguation), several people
- Phoebe Russell, Australian classical double bass player
- Pinckney Warren Russell (1864–1941), American classics scholar, educator, pastor
- Polly Russell, British historian

== R ==
- Rachel Russell, Lady Russell (c. 1636–1723), English letter writer and author
- Rachel Renée Russell, American children's author
- Reb Russell (1889–1973), American baseball player
- Regan Russell (1955–2020), Canadian animal rights activist
- Reiss-Alexander Russell-Denny (born 2006), English footballer
- Richard Russell (disambiguation), several people
- Rip Russell (1915–1976), American baseball player
- Robert Russell (disambiguation), several people
- Robin Russell, 14th Duke of Bedford (1940–2003), British peer and conservationist
- Ronald Russell (disambiguation), Multiple people
- Rosalind Russell (1907–1976), American actress
- Ross Russell (footballer, born 1967) (born 1967), Trinidadian footballer
- Ross Russell (jazz), (1909–2000), American record producer
- Rusty Russell (disambiguation), several people
- Ryan Russell (ice hockey) (born 1987), Canadian hockey player
- Ryan Russell (American football) (born 1992), American football player

== S ==
- Sally-Anne Russell, Australian mezzo-soprano
- Sam Russell (disambiguation), several people
- Samuel Russell (disambiguation), several people
- Sara Russell (born 1966), British planetary scientist
- Sarah Amanda Sanders Russell (1844–1913), American political hostess
- Sarah Rachel Russell (c. 1814–1880), British criminal
- Scott Russell (disambiguation), several people
- Seán Russell (1893–1940), Irish republican
- Sean Russell (author) (born 1952), Canadian fantasy author
- Seth Russell (born 1994), American football player
- Sheila Russell (1935–2022), American politician
- Shirley Russell (artist) (1886–1985), American artist
- Shirley Ann Russell (1935–2002), British costume designer
- Simon Russell (disambiguation), several people
- Sol Smith Russell (1848–1902), American actor
- Stephen Russell (disambiguation), several people
- Steve Russell (disambiguation), several people
- Stuart Russell (disambiguation), several people

== T ==
- Taylor Russell (born 1994), Canadian actress
- Ted Russell (disambiguation), several people
- Theresa Russell (born 1957), American actress
- Theodore E. Russell (born 1936), American diplomat
- Thomas Russell (disambiguation), also Tom Russell, several people
- Tim Russell (born 1947), American radio personality and voice actor
- Twan Russell (born 1974), American football player

== V ==
- Vaughan Russell (1890–1979), Scottish footballer

== W ==
- Walter Russell (1871–1963), American artist and author
- Walter B. Russell Jr. (1929–2016), American army officer and politician
- Walter Westley Russell (1867–1949), British painter and art teacher
- Welford Russell (1900–1975), Canadian composer
- William Russell (disambiguation), also Will and Willy Russell, several people
- Wriothesley Russell, 2nd Duke of Bedford (1680–1711), British noble and politician
- Wriothesley Russell, 3rd Duke of Bedford (1708–1732), British noble and peer
- Wyatt Russell (born 1986), American actor and former ice hockey player

== See also ==
- Clan Russell
- Duke of Bedford, held by the Russell family
- Earl Russell
- Lady Russell (disambiguation)
- Lord Russell (disambiguation)
- Roussel (surname)
- Russel (disambiguation)
- Russell (given name)
