= Robert Russell =

Robert or Bob Russell may refer to:

== Politics ==
- Robert Russell (died 1404), English MP for Worcestershire, 1395
- Robert Russell (MP for Coventry), member of parliament in 1298
- Bob Russell (British politician) (born 1946), British Liberal Democrat MP for Colchester
- Bob Russell (Canadian politician), leader of the Liberal Party of Alberta and municipal councillor
- Robert B. Russell (1889–1964), Canadian labour organizer and politician
- Robert E. Russell (1941–2019), Virginia state senator
- Sir Robert Frankland-Russell, 7th Baronet (1784–1849), English politician and artist

== Sport ==
- Bob Russell (ice hockey) (born 1955), retired Canadian professional ice hockey player
- Robbie Russell (rugby union) (born 1976), Scottish rugby player
- Robbie Russell (footballer) (born 1979), Ghanaian footballer
- Bobby Russell (Australian footballer) (1893–1943), Australian rules footballer
- Bobby Russell (footballer, born 1919) (1919–2004), Scottish football wing half (Chelsea)
- Bobby Russell (footballer, born 1957), Scottish football midfielder (Rangers, Motherwell)
- Jack Russell (cricketer, born 1963) (Robert Charles Russell), England cricket wicket keeper and artist
- Bob Russell (Australian footballer) (born 1945), Australian rules footballer
- Rab Russell (born 1953), Scottish footballer

== Music, acting and entertainment ==
- Robert Russell (actor) (1936–2008), English film and television actor in Witchfinder General
- Robert W. Russell (1912–1992), American screenwriter
- Bob Russell (television presenter) (1908–1998), host of beauty pageants during the 1940s and 1950s
- Bobby Russell (1940–1992), American songwriter, wrote "The Night the Lights Went Out in Georgia"
- Bob Russell (songwriter) (1914–1970), American songwriter, wrote "He Ain't Heavy, He's My Brother"
- Robert Russell (composer) (1933–2020), American composer, educator, and broadcaster
- Robert Russell, Jamaican who helped found Reggae Sumfest

== Other ==
- Robert Russell, American activist and writer, director of Cartoonists Rights Network International
- Robert D. Russell, professor of mathematics at Simon Fraser University
- Robert Russell (Irish mathematician) (c. 1858–1938), at Trinity College Dublin
- Robert Russell (pioneer) (1806–1891), colonist of South Australia
- Robert Hamilton Russell (1860–1933), English-born Australian surgeon
- Robert Lee Russell (1900–1955), U.S. federal judge
- Robert Russell (architect) (1808–1900), London born architect and surveyor active in Australia
- Robert John Russell (born 1946), founder and director of the Center for Theology and the Natural Sciences
- Robert T. Russell, U.S. judge
- Robert Vane Russell (1873–1915), British civil servant
- Robert Tor Russell (1888–1972), British architect
- Bob Russell (The West Wing), character in TV series played by Gary Cole
