= Charles Russell =

Charles Russell may refer to:

== Entertainment ==
- Charles Marion Russell (1864–1926), artist of the American West
- Charles Russell (actor) (1918–1985), American actor
- Charles Ellsworth Russell, jazz clarinetist, better known as Pee Wee Russell (1906–1969)

== Politics and law ==
=== United Kingdom ===
- Charles Russell (1786–1856), British member of parliament (MP) for Reading
- Lord Charles Russell (1807–1894), British soldier and MP
- Sir Charles Russell, 3rd Baronet (1826–1883), English Conservative politician and recipient of the Victoria Cross
- Charles Russell, Baron Russell of Killowen (1832–1900), British statesman
- Sir Charles Russell, 1st Baronet (1863–1928), British solicitor
- Charles Ritchie Russell, Baron Russell of Killowen (1908–1986), British judge and law lord

=== United States ===
- Charles Theodore Russell (1815–1896), Massachusetts legislator and mayor of Cambridge, Massachusetts
- Charles Wells Russell (1818–1867), Virginia lawyer and politician; Confederate delegate during the American Civil War
- Charles Wells Russell Jr. (1856–1927), American diplomat
- Charles H. Russell (Brooklyn) (1845–1912), American lawyer and politician from New York
- Charles Addison Russell (1852–1902), U.S. representative from Connecticut
- Charles E. Russell (1868–1960), New York politician and judge
- Charles H. Russell (1903–1989), governor of Nevada
- Charles S. Russell (1926–2026), judge in the U.S. state of Virginia
- C. E. Russell (politician) (1921–2010), American politician in Florida

=== Other politicians ===
- Charles Russell (Newfoundland journalist) (1877–1937), Newfoundland journalist and politician
- Charles Russell (Australian politician) (1907–1977), Australian politician
- Charles Homer Russell, Canadian political candidate

== Sports ==
- Charles Russell (rugby) (1884–1957), Australian dual-code rugby footballer
- Jack Russell (cricketer, born 1887) (Charles Albert George Russell, 1887–1961), English cricketer
- Charles Russell (cricketer, born 1814) (1814–1859), English cricketer and descendant of Oliver Cromwell

== Other occupations ==
- Charles Alexander Russell (known as Alec) (1885–1980), Australian architect, in practice with F. Kenneth Milne 1925-1930
- Charles E. B. Russell (1866–1917), author and early figure in the history of youth work
- Charles Edward Russell (1860–1941), American journalist, author, and activist
- Charles Handy Russell (1796–1884), American merchant and banker
- Charles L. Russell (1844–1910), U.S. Army corporal and Medal of Honor recipient
- Charles Sawyer Russell (1831–1866), American Civil War general
- Charles Taze Russell (1852–1916), American evangelist
- Charles Thaddeus Russell (1875–1952), African-American architect from Richmond, Virginia
- Charles William Russell (1812–1880), Irish Roman Catholic clergyman and scholar

== Fictional characters ==
- Colonel Charles Michael Russell, fictional character of William Haggard

== See also ==
- Charlie Russell (disambiguation)
- Chuck Russell (born 1958), American film director
- Charles M. Russell National Wildlife Refuge, a park in Montana
- Russell (surname)
