= Thomas Russell =

Thomas or Tom Russell may refer to:

== Arts and entertainment ==
- Thomas Russell (poet) (1762–1788), English poet
- Thomas O'Neill Russell (1828–1908), Irish novelist
- Tom Russell (born 1947/8), American singer-songwriter
- Tom Russell (DJ) (born 1948), Scottish rock music broadcaster and writer

== Law and politics ==
=== United Kingdom ===
- Thomas Russell (fl. 1417–1433), English politician, MP for Midhurst, Chichester, Reigate and East Grinstead
- Thomas Russell (died 1632) (1577–1632), English politician
- Thomas Russell (Glasgow MP) (1836–1911), British MP for Buteshire and Glasgow
- Thomas Russell (colonial administrator) (1920–2016), British colonial administrator, governor of the Cayman Islands
- Patrick Russell (judge) (Thomas Patrick Russell, 1926–2002), British jurist, judge of the High Court of England and Wales

=== United States ===
- Thomas Russell (Massachusetts judge) (1825–1887), American state court judge and ambassador
- Thomas A. Russell (1858–1938), American attorney and law clerk
- Thomas B. Russell (born 1945), U.S. federal judge
- Thomas Russell (mayor), American politician in Kentucky

=== Elsewhere ===
- Thomas Russell (New Zealand politician) (1830–1904), New Zealand lawyer, businessman and politician
- Sir Thomas Russell, 1st Baronet (1841–1920), Irish politician

== Sports ==
- Thomas Russell (cricketer) (1863–1927), English cricketer
- Tom Russell (footballer, born 1909) (1909–1975), Scottish footballer
- Tom Russell (ice hockey) (born 1929), Canadian ice hockey player

== Others ==
- Thomas Russell (archdeacon of Cork) (1693–1745), Irish Anglican priest
- Thomas Russell (rebel) (1767–1803), Irish activist, co-founder and leader of the United Irishmen
- Thomas Macnamara Russell (died 1824), British admiral in the Royal Navy
- Thomas Russell (minister) (1781–1846), English independent minister
- Thomas Wentworth Russell (1879–1954), British police officer in the Egyptian service
- Thomas J. Russell (born 1933), American engineer and businessman
