= Edward Russell =

Edward or Ted Russell may refer to:

== Politics ==
- Edward Russell (Maine politician) (1782–1835), secretary of state of Maine (1830–31), brigadier general in the militia
- Lord Edward Russell (1805–1887), British naval officer and member of parliament
- Lord Edward Russell (1642–1714), English member of parliament
- Edward Russell, 1st Baron Russell of Liverpool (1834–1920), British journalist and Liberal politician
- Edward Russell, 23rd Baron de Clifford (1824–1877), British Whig politician
- J. Edward Russell (1867–1953), U.S. Representative from Ohio
- Edward Russell (Australian politician) (1878–1925), senator
- Ted Russell (Canadian politician) (1904–1977), Canadian politician and writer
- Ted Russell (Irish politician) (1912–2004), Irish politician and company director

== Other ==
- Edward Russell, 3rd Earl of Bedford (1572–1627), Earl in the Peerage of England
- Edward Russell, 1st Earl of Orford (1653–1727), Royal Navy officer, First Lord of the Admiralty under King William III
- Edward Russell, 2nd Baron Russell of Liverpool (1895–1981), British soldier, lawyer and historian
- Edward Russell, 26th Baron de Clifford (1907–1982), only son of Jack Southwell Russell, 25th Baron de Clifford
- Edward Russell (trade unionist) (1867–1943), Australian trade unionist
- Edward Russell (television presenter) (born 1989), British Singaporean television presenter and actor
- E. John Russell (1872–1965), British agriculturalist
- E. S. Russell (1887–1954), Scottish biologist and philosopher of biology
- Edward Russell (cricketer) (1875–1940), English cricketer
- Ted Russell (musician), Mississippi bandleader and conductor

== See also ==
- Theodore Russell (disambiguation)
