= Theodore Russell =

Theodore Russell may refer to:

- Theodore E. Russell (born 1936), U.S. ambassador to Slovakia
- Ted Russell (musician) (fl. 1940s), American conductor

== See also ==
- Theodore Roussel (1847–1926), French-born English painter and graphic artist
- Theodore Russel (1614–1689), English painter of Flemish parentage
