= Francis Russell =

Francis Russell may refer to:

- Francis Russell (author) (1910–1989), American author
- Francis Russell (art historian), British art historian
- Francis Russell, 2nd Earl of Bedford (c. 1527–1585), English nobleman, soldier and politician
- Francis Russell (MP for Northumberland) (died 1585), MP for Northumberland, son of the above
- Francis Russell, 4th Earl of Bedford (1587–1641), English politician
- Sir Francis Russell, 2nd Baronet, of Chippenham (c. 1616–1664), Member of Parliament and a soldier for the parliamentary cause during the English Civil War
- Sir Francis Russell, 2nd Baronet, of Wytley (1637–1706), Member of Parliament for Tewkesbury, 1673–1690
- Francis Russell, Marquess of Tavistock (1739–1767), British politician and eldest son of the 4th Duke of Bedford
- Francis Russell (solicitor) (1740–1795), secretary to the Duchy of Lancaster
- Francis Russell, 5th Duke of Bedford (1765–1802), English aristocrat and Whig politician
- Francis Russell, 7th Duke of Bedford (1788–1861), British peer and Whig politician
- Francis Russell, 9th Duke of Bedford (1819–1891), English politician and agriculturalist
- Francis H. Russell (1904–1989), American diplomat
- Francis Russell (MP for Cheltenham) (1840–1912), British cavalry Major-General and Member of Parliament for Cheltenham, 1895–1900
- Francis William Russell (1800–1871), Member of the UK Parliament for Limerick City
- Francis Albert Rollo Russell (1849–1914), son of John Russell, 1st Earl Russell and first person to be born to a sitting British prime minister

== See also ==
- Frank Russell (disambiguation)
- Frances Russell (1941–2022), author and journalist in Winnipeg, Canada
- Frances Russell, Countess Russell, wife of the Prime Minister of the United Kingdom
