= Roussel (surname) =

Roussel or Roussell is a surname of French origin. Notable people with the surname include:

- Aage Roussell (1901–1972), Danish architect, archaeologist, and historian
- Aaron Roussell, American basketball coach
- Albert Roussel (1869–1937), French composer
- Antoine Roussel (born 1989), French ice hockey player
- Athina Onassis Roussel (born 1985), French-Greek equestrian, socialite, and heiress; daughter of Thierry
- Cédric Roussel (1978–2023), Belgian footballer
- Charley Roussel Fomen (born 1989), Cameroonian footballer
- Claude Roussel (1930–2025), Canadian sculptor, painter and educator
- Claude Roussel (athlete) (1941–1992), French bobsledder
- Dominic Roussel (born 1970), Canadian ice hockey player
- Eric Roussell (1911–1977), Clerk of the New Zealand House of Representatives
- Fabien Roussel (born 1969), French politician
- Gaëtan Roussel (born 1972), French singer, songwriter, and composer
- Gérard Roussel (1500–1550), French Catholic theologian, Renaissance humanist, and bishop
- Henri François Anne de Roussel (1748–1812), French naturalist
- Henry Roussel (1875–1946), French silent film actor, film director, and screenwriter
- Hippolyte Roussel (died 1898), French priest and missionary to Polynesia
- Jean Roussel (born 1951), Mauritian-born record producer
- Jimsey Roussell (1901–?), American baseball player
- Jonathan Roussel Toledo (born 1937), Honduran journalist, radio host, and television host
- Jules Roussel (born 2006), French racing driver
- Ker-Xavier Roussel (1867–1944), French painter
- Léo Roussel (born 1995), French racing driver
- Louie J. Roussel III (born 1946), American racehorse owner and trainer
- Myriem Roussel (born 1962), French actress
- Nathalie Roussel (born 1956), French actress
- Nelly Roussel (1878–1922), French free thinker, anarchist, and feminist
- Nicolas-François Roussel d'Hurbal (1763–1849), French viscount and soldier during the Napoleonic and French Revolutionary Wars
- Peter Roussel (1941–2022), American press secretary and public relations executive
- Pierre Roussel (1723–1782), French cabinetmaker
- Raoul Roussel (1389–1452), French Catholic archbishop of Rouen; involved in the trial of Joan of Arc
- Raymond Roussel (1877–1933), French poet, novelist, playwright, musician, and chess enthusiast
- Roussel de Bailleul (died 1077), Italo-Norman Byzantine mercenary general and adventurer
- Theodore Roussel (1847–1926), French-born English painter and graphic artist
- Thierry Roussel (born 1953), French businessman, father of Athina
- Thomas Roussel (born 1985), French ice hockey player
- Tom Roussel (born 1945), American football player
- William Roussel (better known as Meyhna'ch; born 1976), French musician and singer

== See also ==
- Russell (surname)
- Roussel (disambiguation)
- Rousselle, surname list
