= Charlie Russell (disambiguation) =

Charles Marion Russell (1864–1926) was an American western painter.

Charlie Russell also may refer to:

- Charlie Taze Russell (1852–1916), American minister
- Charlie Russell (rugby) (1884–1957), Australian rugby player and coach
- Charlie L. Russell (1932–2013), American writer
- Charlie Russell (naturalist) (1941–2018), Canadian naturalist
- Charlie Russell (cricketer) (born 1988), English international cricketer
- Charlie Russell (producer) (fl. 2000s), British music producer
- Charlie Russell (actress) (fl. 2000s), English actress part of the Mischief Theatre ensemble

== See also ==
- Charles Russell (disambiguation)
- Chuck Russell (born 1958), American film director
- Russell (surname)
