= Roussel =

Roussel may refer to:

- Roussel (surname), including a list of people carrying the name
- Roussel de Bailleul (died 1077), Norman adventurer and soldier who founded a principality in Asia Minor
- Roussel (automobile), a French automobile manufactured from 1908 to 1914
- Roussel Uclaf, a French pharmaceutical company

== See also ==
- Big Roussel, the channel between Herm to the west, and Brecqhou and Sark to the east, in the Channel Islands
- Little Roussel, the channel between Herm and Guernsey, in the Channel Islands
- Kirin-Amgen v Hoechst Marion Roussel, a 2004 British court ruling concerning patents
- Rousselle, surname list
