= Xevi =

Xevi is a given name. Notable people with the given name include:

- Xevi Pujolar (born 1973), Spanish Formula One engineer
- Xevi Vilaró (born 1975), Spanish painter
