= Joseph Russell =

Joseph or Joe Russell may refer to:

- Joseph Russell (judge) (1702–1780), chief justice of the Rhode Island Supreme Court
- Joseph Russell (shipbuilder) (1786–1855), Scottish-Canadian businessman
- Joseph Russell (New York politician) (1800–1875), U.S. Representative from New York
- Joseph J. Russell (1854–1922), U.S. Representative from Missouri
- Joseph E. Russell (1864–1940), Wisconsin State Assemblyman, farmer, and teacher
- Joseph Russell (Canadian politician) (1868–1925), Toronto businessman and politician
- Joe Russell (footballer) (1898–1976), Australian football player
- Joe W. Russell (fl. 1965–1966), member of the Illinois House of Representatives
- Joe Russell (New Hampshire politician), member of the New Hampshire House of Representatives
- Joe Russell (singer) (1939–2012), American singer, founding member of the Persuasions
- Joe Russell (tennis) (born 1961), American tennis player
- Joe Russell (backgammon), American backgammon player

== See also ==
- Jo Russell (born 1970), English DJ
