= Adam Russell =

Adam Russell may refer to:

- Adam Russell (baseball) (born 1983), baseball pitcher
- Adam Russell (musician) (fl. 2000s–2010s), bassist and backup vocalist of the band Story of the Year
- Adam Russel (fl. 1295), member of the British parliament for Preston
- Adam H. Russell (fl. 2000s–2020s), American anthropologist
