= Paul Russell =

Paul Russell may refer to:

- Paul Russell (philosopher) (born 1955), at Lund University & the University of British Columbia
- Rusty Russell (born 1973), Australian Linux kernel hacker, whose real name is Paul Russell
- Paul Russell (baseball) (1871–1957), Major League Baseball player
- Paul Russell (Gaelic footballer) (1906–1965), Irish sportsperson
- Paul Russell (photographer) (born 1966), British street photographer
- Paul Russell (novelist), author of The Coming Storm
- Paul Russell, former drummer of Supergroove
- Paul Russell, child actor in Peter Greenaway's Prospero's Books and The Cook, the Thief, His Wife & Her Lover
- Paul Russell, former bass player of Sleeping with Sirens
- Paul Russell (musician), American singer known for the song "Lil Boo Thang"
- Paul Russell, convicted of assisting an offender after the murder of Olivia Pratt-Korbel
- Paul Fitzpatrick Russell (born 1959), American Roman Catholic archbishop and diplomat
- Paul Russell (engineer), British Formula One and motorsports engineer
- Paul S. Russell (1925–2026), American physician
