= Anthony Russell =

Anthony Russell or Tony Russell may refer to:

- Anthony Russell (murderer) (born 1982), British murderer
- Anthony Russell (bishop) (1943–2025), Anglican bishop
- Anthony Russell (British singer), contestant on Series 15 of The X Factor (British)
- Anthony Russell (American singer) (born 1980), American singer
- Anthony Russell, character in Inappropriate Comedy
- Tony Russell (footballer) (born 1961), Australian rules footballer
- Tony Russell (musician) (1943–2025), English musician
- Anthony Patrick Russell (born 1947), Canadian paleontologist

== See also ==
- Anthony Russell-Wood (1940–2010), Welsh historian of Brazil
- Anthony Russell-Roberts (1944–2024), British businessman and opera manager
- Anthony Russel (c. 1663–1743), English portrait-painter
- Tony Russel (1925–2017), American actor
