= Henry Russell =

Henry Russell may refer to:

- Henry Russell (musician) (1812/13–1900), English pianist, baritone singer and composer
- Henry Russell (impresario) (1871–1937), English impresario, conductor, and singing teacher
- Sir Henry Russell, 1st Baronet (1751–1836), British judge in India
- Sir Henry Russell, 2nd Baronet (1783–1852), British 'Resident' at the court of Hyderabad in India
- Henry Russell (explorer) (1834–1909), Irish mountaineer, Pyrenean explorer and eccentric
- Henry Chamberlain Russell (1836–1907), Australian astronomer and meteorologist
- Henry Norris Russell (1877–1957), American astronomer, developer of Hertzsprung-Russell diagram (1910)
- Henry Russell (athlete) (1904–1986), American gold medal winner in 1928 Amsterdam 4 × 100 m relay
- Henry Russell, Marquess of Tavistock (born 2005), Henry Robin Charles Russell; heir apparent of Andrew Russell, Duke of Bedford
- Henry Russell (politician) (1817–1891), New Zealand runholder and politician
- Henry P. Russell (1878–1956), American Medal of Honor recipient
- Henry S. Russell (1838–1905), American military and government official
- Henry Stuart Russell (1818–1889), explorer, politician and pastoralist
- Henry Vane Russell (1809–1846), English cricketer
- Ken Russell (Henry Kenneth Alfred Russell, 1927–2011), English film director

== See also ==
- Henry-Russell Hitchcock (1903–1987), American architectural historian
