= Mark Russell (disambiguation) =

Mark Russell (1932−2023) was an American political satirist and comedian.

Mark Russell may also refer to:

- Mark Russell (actor) (born 1928 or 1929), American film and television actor
- Mark Russell (artistic director), founder of the Under the Radar Festival
- Mark Russell (Australian footballer) (born 1962), Australian footballer for Sydney
- Mark Russell (writer) (born 1971), American comics writer
- Mark Russell (composer) (born 1960), British composer
- Mark Russell (cricketer) (born 1970), English cricketer
- Mark Russell (charity director) (born 1974), Northern Irish evangelist and charity executive
- Mark Russell (footballer, born 1996), Scottish footballer
- Mark Russell (hurler), Irish hurler
- Mark Francis Russell (born 1960), British businessman and public servant, CEO of the Shareholder Executive / UKGI 2013–2019
- Mark Russell (diplomat) (1929–2005), British diplomat
