= Russell Lee =

Russell Lee may refer to:

== People ==
- Russell Lee (writer), writer from Singapore, author of True Singapore Ghost Stories
- Russell Lee (photographer) (1903–1986), American photographer
- Russell Lee (singer), R&B singer featured in a song on They Can't Deport Us All
- Russell Lee Smith (1947–1975), American spree killer who committed suicide
- Russ Lee (born 1950; Russell E. Lee), American basketball player

== Other uses ==
- Russell Lee Elementary School, Austin Independent School District, Austin, Texas, USA

== See also ==
- Russell Lea, New South Wales
- Lee Russell (disambiguation)
