= Andy Russell =

Andy Russell may refer to:

- Andy Russell (Canadian author) (1915–2005), conservationist
- Andy Russell (singer) (1919–1992), American popular vocalist
- Andy Russell (American football) (1941–2024), American football linebacker
- Andy Russell (businessman) (born 1971), American business executive
- Andy Russell (footballer, born 1987), English-born Hong Kong football defender

== See also ==
- Andrew Russell (disambiguation)
