= Andrew Russell =

Andrew Russell may refer to:

- Andrew Russell (Australian politician) (1808–1867), Australian politician and businessman
- Andrew Russell (New Zealand politician) (1812–1900), British Army officer
- Andrew J. Russell (1829–1902), American photographer
- Sir Andrew Hamilton Russell (1868–1960), World War I New Zealand general
- Andrew Russell, 15th Duke of Bedford (born 1962), English peer
- Andrew Russell (Australian soldier) (c. 1969–2002), Australian SAS soldier killed in Afghanistan
- Andrew Russell (canoeist) (born 1983), Canadian canoeist
- Andrew Russell (footballer) (born 1993), Scottish footballer
- Andrew Russell (academic), British academic
- Andrew Russell (baseball) (born 1984), Australian baseball pitcher

== See also ==
- Andy Russell (disambiguation)
- Andrew Russel (1856–1934), American politician and banker in Illinois
