= Paul Russell (engineer) =

British engineer

- Occupation: Engineer
- Employer: Sauber Motorsport
- Known for: Formula One Engineer

Paul Russell is a British Formula One and motorsports engineer. He is best known for holding a number of senior engineering roles at Sauber Motorsport including Head of Trackside Engineering, Race Engineer and Test Engineer.

== Career ==
Russell graduated from the University of Brighton in 1989 with a degree in Electrical and Electronic Engineering. He began his professional career at Lola Cars as an electronics engineer, working on on-car and off-car electrical, electronic, and sensor systems, including wind-tunnel instrumentation and factory test rigs.

He joined Sauber Motorsport in May 1997, initially working in data analysis before progressing to a test engineering role with the Hinwil-based team. He remained in this position through the organisation’s transition into BMW Sauber, and in 2009 was appointed race engineer to Nick Heidfeld. When the team reverted to private ownership as Sauber in 2010, Russell served as race engineer to Pedro de la Rosa during the early part of the season, before reuniting with Heidfeld following the German’s return to the team at the 2010 Singapore Grand Prix.

Russell then returned to the test team from 2011 to 2015, where his role focused on driver development and data analysis. He also engineered Simona de Silvestro as part of the team’s programme evaluating her for a potential race seat in 2015. During the closing stages of the 2015 season Russell returned to a race engineering role, supporting Felipe Nasr for the final rounds of the championship. In 2016 he briefly served as interim Head of Track Engineering prior to the arrival of Xevi Pujolar, after which he transitioned towards vehicle dynamics and aerodynamic performance development.
