= Michael Russell =

Michael, Mike or Mick Russell may refer to:

== Churchmen ==
- Michael Russell (bishop of Glasgow and Galloway) (1806–1848), Episcopalian Bishop of Glasgow and Galloway
- Michael Russell (bishop of Waterford and Lismore) (1920–2009), Roman Catholic Bishop of Waterford and Lismore, Ireland

== Musicians ==
- Mike "Razz" Russell, multi-instrumentalist and member of the Original Harmony Ridge Creekdippers
- Micho Russell (1915–1994), Irish traditional musician (tin whistle player)

== Politicians ==
- Michael Russell (American politician) (1844–1901), New York politician
- Michael Russell (Scottish politician) (born 1953), Cabinet Secretary for Government Business and Constitutional Relations in the Scottish Government

== Sportsmen ==
- Michael Russell (sailor) (born 1949), Bahamian Olympic sailor
- Michael Russell (tennis) (born 1978), American tennis player
- Mike Russell (billiards player) (born 1969), English billiards player
- Mike Russell (rugby union) (born 1967), New Zealand rugby player
- Mike Frank Russell (born 1977), Irish Gaelic footballer
- Mick Russell (referee), Scottish amateur football referee
- Mick Russell (rugby league), Australian rugby league player

== Others ==
- Michael Russell (scientist), British geologist
- Mike Russell (author), American writer and cartoonist
- Mike Russell, founder of American City Business Journals
- Michael Russell (psychiatrist) (1932–2009), academic research of nicotine addiction
- Michael Russell (lawyer), Australian lawyer and class action expert
