= Katherine Russell =

Katherine or Catherine Russell may refer to:

- Katherine Russell (social worker) (1909–1998), English social worker and university teacher
- Katherine Russell Rich (1955–2012), American writer
- Katheryn Russell-Brown (born 1961), American professor of law
- Katharine Tait (Katharine Jane Russell), author and essayist, daughter of philosopher Bertrand Russell, granddaughter of Viscountess Amberley
- Katharine Russell, Viscountess Amberley (Katharine Louisa Stanley, 1842–1874), British suffragette, grandmother of Katherine Tait
- Katherine Russell, widow of Boston Marathon bomber Tamerlan Tsarnaev
- Katherine Russell (1848–1915), Australian actress married to Alfred Dampier
- Kate Russell (reporter) (Kathryn Jane Russell, born 1968), British reporter
- Catherine Russell (American actress) (born 1956), American actress, known for her long-running appearance in the play Perfect Crime
- Catherine Russell (British actress) (born 1965), British actress
- Catherine Russell (singer) (born 1956), American jazz singer
- Catherine M. Russell (born 1961), American federal government official

== See also ==
- Russell (surname)
- Kate Russell (disambiguation)
- Kathleen Russell (disambiguation)
