= Keith Russell =

Keith Russell may refer to:

- Keith Russell (politician) (born 1975), Canadian politician
- Keith Russell (diver) (born 1948), American Olympic diver
- Keith Russell (footballer) (born 1974), English footballer
- Keith Russell (bishop) (1916–1979), British Anglican bishop
- Keith Russell (ornithologist), American naturalist

== See also ==
- Russell (surname)
