= Frank Russell =

Frank Russell may refer to:

- Frank Russell, Baron Russell of Killowen (1867–1946), British Lord of Appeal in Ordinary
- Frank Russell, 2nd Earl Russell (1865–1931), British politician and brother of Bertrand Russell
- Ted Malone (1908–1989), ne Frank Russell, American radio broadcaster
- Frank Henry Russell (1878–1947), American aviation pioneer
- Frank Russell (anthropologist) (1868–1903)
- Frank Russell (baseball) (1921–1984), American Negro leagues baseball player
- Frank Russell (bassist), American jazz bassist
- Frank Russell (basketball) (1949–2021), American basketball player
- Frank Ford Russell (1904–1969), American wrestler

== See also ==
- Russell Investment Group, aka Frank Russell Company, US investment services company
- Francis Russell (disambiguation)
