= Richard Russell =

Richard Russell may refer to:

== Politics ==
- Richard M. Russell (1891–1977), American politician, U.S. representative from Massachusetts
- Richard Russell Jr. (1897–1971), governor and U.S. senator from Georgia
- R. J. Russell (Richard John Russell, 1872–1943), British dental surgeon and Liberal politician
- Richard Russell (MP for Dunwich), member of parliament (MP) for Dunwich, 1420–1427
- Richard Russell (MP for City of York) (died 1435), MP for City of York

== Sports ==
- Richard Russell (rugby union) (1879–1960), English rugby union footballer
- Richard Russell (rugby league) (born 1967), English rugby league footballer
- Dick Russell (footballer) (1922–1974), Australian rules footballer for Port Adelaide
- Richard Russell (tennis) (1945–2025), Jamaican tennis player

== Other ==
- Richard Russell (bishop) (ca. 1630–1693), English bishop of Portalegre and Viseu in Portugal
- Richard Russell (doctor) (1687–1759), English doctor from the 18th century
- Richard Russell Sr. (1861–1938), chief justice of the Georgia Supreme Court
- Richard Joel Russell (1895–1971), American geologist and geographer
- Richard Russell (music producer) (born 1971), British record producer and owner of XL Recordings
- Richard T. Russell, British computer scientist
- USS Richard B. Russell (SSN-687), a United States Navy attack submarine, 1975–1994
- Richard Russell, American airport ground worker who stole and crashed a commercial airplane in 2018
- Dick Russell (author), American investigative journalist, author, and environmental activist

== See also ==
- Russell (surname)
