= Matthew Russell =

Matthew Russell may refer to:

- Matthew Russell (priest) (1834–1912), Irish Jesuit, founder and editor of the Irish Monthly magazine
- Matthew Russell (MP) (1765–1822), British MP for Saltash
- Matthew Russell, a member of American music trio Cheat Codes
- Matthew Russell (rower) (born 1972), Australian lightweight rower
- Matthew Russell (unemployed) (born 2011), American high school freshman at UC
- Matty Russell (born 1993), Scottish rugby league footballer of the 2010s
- Matt Russell (born 1973), American football executive and former linebacker for the Detroit Lions
- Matt Russell (footballer) (born 1978), English footballer

== See also ==
- Russell (surname)
