= Lee Russell =

Lee Russell may refer to:

- Lee M. Russell (1875–1943), American politician from Mississippi
- Lee Russell (record producer) (born 1970), English record producer and musician
- Lee Russell (footballer) (born 1969), English footballer
- Liane Russell (1923–2019), American geneticist and conservationist

== See also ==
- All pages with titles containing "Lee" and "Russel"
- Russell Lee (disambiguation)
- Russell (surname)
- Russell (disambiguation)
- Lee (given name)
- Lee (disambiguation)
