= Donald Russell =

Donald Russell may refer to:

- Donald S. Russell (1906–1998), Democratic Senator from South Carolina
- Donald Russell (classicist) (1920–2020), British educator and author
- Donald J. Russell (1900–1985), American railroad executive
- Donald Russell (American football), former American football coach
- Don Russell, Australian public servant and administrator
- Don Russell (art director), British art director
- Donald R. Russell, pharmacist and mayor of New Toronto, Ontario
- Donald Russell, a butchery company owned by Vestey Holdings
