= Charles Russell (cricketer, born 1814) =

English cricketer

Charles William Cromwell Russell (14 May 1814 – 12 June 1859) was an English cricketer who played in a single first-class cricket match for Cambridge University in 1836. He was born at Cheshunt in Hertfordshire and died there too.

Russell was educated privately and at Gonville and Caius and Queens' College, Cambridge. His family claimed descent from Oliver Cromwell's youngest child, who married a Russell. His single game of first-class cricket came in the 1836 season, when he opened the batting for the university side the match against Marylebone Cricket Club at Cambridge; he scored 21 and 11. The Cambridge University side played other matches that season, including the University Match against Oxford University, but he was not picked for any of these games, and did not play again, even in minor matches.

Russell changed colleges at Cambridge University, but there is no record that he took a degree.
