= Adam Russel =

13th-century English politician

Adam Russel (fl. 1295) was an English politician. He was a Member of the Parliament of England for Preston in 1295. He and Willielmus fil' (filius) Pauli were the first recorded members of Parliament for this constituency.

Parliament of England
Preceded by {{{before}}}	Member of Parliament for Preston; 1295; With: Willielmus fil' (filius) Pauli	Succeeded by Adam fil' Radulfi; Adam de Biri
