= Stephen Russell (disambiguation) =

Stephen Russell is an American actor.

Stephen Russell may also refer to:

- Stephen Russell (cricketer) (born 1945), English cricketer and businessman
- Stephen Russell (1954 - 2020), Taoist practitioner known as the Barefoot Doctor
- Stephen Russell (MP), Member of Parliament (MP) for Melcombe Regis
- Stephen Russell (born 1964), Director-General of ANEC

== See also ==
- Steve Russell (disambiguation)
- Steven Jay Russell (born 1957), American con artist
