= Thomas J. Russell =

American engineer and businessman (born 1933)

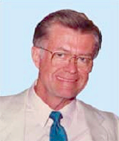
- Born: June 13, 1933 (age 92); Iowa, United States
- Education: Iowa State University and University of Missouri
- Occupations: Engineer and businessman
- Known for: Early pioneers of microwave technology

Thomas J. Russell (born June 13, 1933) is an American engineer and businessman. He was one of the early pioneers of microwave technology, specializing in ultrabroadband microwave directional couplers. Due to his contributions in shaping the microwave industry with innovation and invention, Thomas J. Russell was officially named a Microwave Legend in 2006.

== Early life and education ==
Thomas J. Russell grew up in Rock Rapids, Iowa, where he attended Iowa State University and studied Electrical Engineering. He then moved to the University of Missouri to begin post-graduate studies in Electrical Engineering and a second master's degree in Mathematics.

== Career ==
After graduation, he joined Douglas Aircraft Company in Santa Monica and then moved on to Bendix Aviation in Kansas City and joined Alfred Electronics in Palo Alto in 1966, before starting his own company nine years later.

In 1975 Russell founded KRYTAR, a privately owned company that specializes in the manufacture of ultra broadband microwave components and test equipment for space, military and commercial usage. Russell developed one of the first computer-aided engineering (CAE) tools specifically for the design of microwave couplers. This software was used for the design and development of several of the company's early patented product lines.

While running KRYTAR, Russell was also responsible for seven patents related to microwave technology.

Russell’s first patent was filed in 1966. During his career he filed 8 separate patents, spanning four decades, all related to directional couplers and similar technologies. In 1979 he received a patent based upon the idea of increasing the directivity of a coupler by building the central couplers in a unique configuration for a TEM mode strip-line directional coupler. By making the end portion immediately adjacent and in between the diverging conductors facing the coupling portion, thus increasing the directivity of TEM mode strip-line directional couplers which decreases cost.

Over the course of his career, Russell also contributed to a number of industry journals, such as the IEEE Microwave Journal, where he published ideas on microwave power dividers and his patented matched-line directional dividers (MLDD), amongst other topics.
