= Simon Russell =

Simon Russell may refer to:

- Simon Russell (footballer) (born 1985), English footballer
- Simon Russell (composer), British composer for TV and film
- Simon Russell, 3rd Baron Russell of Liverpool (born 1952), British peer

== See also ==
- Simon Russell Beale, English actor, author and music historian
