= Charlie Russell (naturalist) =

Canadian naturalist

- Born: Andrew Charles Russell; August 19, 1941; Pincher Creek, Alberta, Canada
- Died: May 7, 2018 (aged 76); Calgary, Alberta, Canada
- Occupation: Naturalist
- Known for: Study of grizzly bears

Andrew Charles Russell (August 19, 1941 – May 7, 2018) was a Canadian naturalist known for his study of grizzly bears.

== Early life ==
Russell grew up in Alberta in the Canadian Rockies as the son of hunter, guide, film maker, and naturalist Andy Russell. Charlie and his three brothers learned about the wilderness from their father, assisting him as adventure guides and cameramen. His brothers went to college and became biologists, while Charlie became a rancher.

== Career ==
Russell was fascinated by grizzly bears, trying to overcome their image as savage killers by making his cattle ranch open to grizzlies and leading ecotourists on bear-viewing trips (as opposed to hunting which had previously been the objective of grizzly tours). He tried, mostly unsuccessfully, to convince wildlife officials to treat bears with respect and trust, arguing that it is people's fear of bears and aggressive actions toward them that makes them dangerous.

Russell is best known for his ten years of field work in Kamchatka, where he taught local guides how to lead bear-viewing tours. He began to buy orphaned grizzly cubs from zoos, taking them into remote areas of Kamchatka and teaching them to be wild. He has been the subject of two television documentaries: Walking with Giants: The Grizzlies of Siberia (PBS, 1999) and Bear Man of Kamchatka (BBC, 2006).

== Death ==
He died after complications from surgery at a hospital in Calgary, Alberta, on May 7, 2018.

== Bibliography ==
- Spirit Bear: Encounters with the White Bear of the Western Rainforest
- Grizzly Heart: Living Without Fear Among the Brown Bears of Kamchatka
- Grizzly Seasons
- Learning to Be Wild: Raising Orphan Grizzlies
