= Mark Russell (Australian footballer) =

Australian rules footballer

Personal information
- Full name: Mark Russell
- Born: 18 January 1962 (age 64)
- Original team: North Ballarat
- Height: 190 cm (6 ft 3 in)
- Weight: 96 kg (212 lb)

Playing career^{1}
Years	Club	Games (Goals)
1985	Sydney	14 (13)
- ^{1} Playing statistics correct to the end of 1985.

Mark Russell (born 18 January 1962) is a former Australian rules footballer who played with Sydney in the Victorian Football League (VFL).
