= Frederick Russell (disambiguation) =

Frederick Russell (1923–2001) was a Canadian businessman and politician.

Frederick Russell may also refer to:

- Frederick F. Russell (1870–1960), American doctor
- Frederick Nene Russell (fl. 1868–1886), New Zealand MP
- Frederick Stratten Russell (1897–1984), British marine biologist
- Frederick Brett Russell (1813–1869), English architect and artist
- Fred Russell (1906–2003), American sports writer
- Fred Russell (American football) (born 1980), American football running back
- Fred Russell (ventriloquist) (1862–1957), English ventriloquist
- Fred Russell (bowls) (1890–1972), lawn bowls competitor for New Zealand
- Fred J. Russell (1916–2007), American businessman and diplomat
