= Henry Vane Russell =

English cleric and cricketer

Henry Vane Russell (14 January 1809 – 21 May 1846) was an English cricketer active in 1832 who played for Oxford University. He appeared in one first-class match, scoring eight runs with a highest score of 5*. He was born in Lewisham, Kent, the son of Robert and Elizabeth Russell. He was educated at Corpus Christi College, Oxford, then became a Church of England priest. He married Eliza Tylden in 1834. He was vicar of Stottesdon, Shropshire, at the date of his death.
