= Gerald F. Russell =

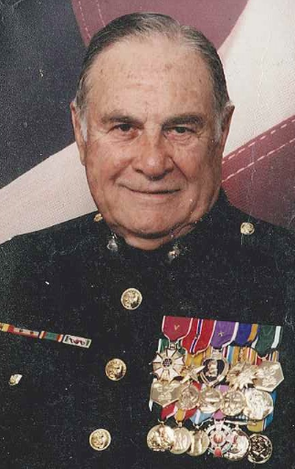
- Born: Gerald Russell; May 1, 1916; Providence, Rhode Island, U.S.
- Died: February 24, 2014 (aged 97); State College, Pennsylvania, U.S.
- Burial place: Arlington National Cemetery; Arlington, Virginia, U.S.
- Military career
- Allegiance: United States of America
- Branch: United States Marine Corps
- Service years: 1940–1968
- Rank: Colonel
- Nickname: "The Colonel"

Gerald F. Russell was a Marine who served in World War II, including missions to Iwo Jima and Guadalcanal. He commanded one of the first units to land in Japan and provided protection for the US technical teams covering the atomic bomb site in Nagasaki. Russell also witnessed the historical raising of the American flag on Mount Suribachi in Iwo Jima.

== Early years ==
Russell was born May 1, 1916, in Providence, Rhode Island.

Russell graduated from La Salle Academy in Providence where he was the National Schoolboy Miler winner in his senior year and awarded a Track scholarship to Boston College where he graduated in history in 1940. Russell was the first alternate for the 1940 US Olympic Team in the 800 meters.

== Education ==
He held a Master of Business Administration from George Washington University and a Master in Education from American University.

== Military career ==
Russell later served as military representative to the 1968 US Olympic team and US Olympic site selection committee. He was the United States representative to the Conseil International du Sports Militaire in 1967. He was instrumental in starting and eventually coaching the United States Marine Corps (USMC) track team.

=== Awards ===
Awards: Republic of Korea Distinguished Service Medal, Bronze Star with V for Valor, the Navy Commendation Medal, the Army Commendation Medal, Purple Heart Medal with two gold stars, U.S. Presidential Citation with four stars, Korean Presidential Unit Citation with three stars, Navy Meritorious Unit Citation, the Defense Medal, Asiatic Pacific Medal with three stars, World War II Victory Medal, National Defense Medal, World War II Japan Occupation Medal, the United Nations Service Medal, Korean Service Medal

== Later years ==
Following his retirement from the Marine Corps in 1968, Russell went to Penn State to begin a second career as a university administrator at the behest of then-provost, Ralph Rackley. Russell retired from Penn State in 1987 as associate dean of the College of Health, Physical Education and Recreation.

Russell served as a member of the Centre County United Way Board of Directors, chairman of the Centre County United Way Day of Caring, and was community volunteer and leader, including with the Pennsylvania Special Olympics, and Centre County Toys for Tots.

Russell was known as "The Colonel."

In 2011, Russell was the inaugural awardee for the LT Michael P Murphy Distinguished Citizen Award.

Russell died February 24, 2014, at Mount Nittany Medical Center.

== Legacy ==
Russell was buried with military honors at Arlington National Cemetery.

The Marine Corps League's Nittany Leathernecks Detachment #302 honored Russell with a scholarship in his name. The Scholarship was established to provide post secondary education financial support for children and grandchildren of Centre County Servicemen and women who served their country since September 11, 2001.

The Centre County United Way Day of Caring was renamed to the Colonel Russell Day of Caring.
