= Eric Russell =

Eric Russell may refer to:

- Eric Frank Russell (1905–1978), British writer
- Eric Russell (cricketer) (1936–2026), Scottish English cricketer
- Eric Russell (athlete) (born 1944), Australian athlete

== See also ==
- Erick Russell, American politician
