= Mary Russell =

Mary Russell may refer to:

- Ann Russell Miller (born Mary Ann Russell, 1928–2021), American socialite and nun
- Lady Mary Russell (1934–2022), Scottish socialite
- Mary Baptist Russell (1829–1898), Irish-born American religious sister, nurse, philanthropist, and educator
- Mary Doria Russell (born 1950), American author
- Mary Jane Russell (1926–2003), American photographic fashion model
- Mary Rhodes Russell (born 1958), American judge
- Mary Russell Cromwell, English wife of Wingfield Cromwell, 2nd Earl of Ardglass
- Mary Russell, Duchess of Bedford (1865–1937), English pilot and ornithologist
- Mary Russell (singer) (born 1951), American soul singer
- Mary Russell (character) (active since 1994), a fictional character in works by Laurie R. King
- Mary Russell (ship), built in 1817

== See also ==
- Mary Russell Mitford (1787–1855), English author
