= Bruce Russell =

Bruce Russell may refer to:

- Bruce Russell (cartoonist) (1903–1963), American editorial cartoonist
- Bruce Russell (footballer) (1859–1942), England international footballer
- Bruce Russell (musician) (born 1960), New Zealand musician
