= Joe Russell (footballer) =

Australian rules footballer (1898–1976)

Personal information
- Full name: Joe Russell
- Born: 17 March 1898
- Died: 10 April 1976 (aged 78)
- Original team: North Melbourne (VFA)
- Height: 171 cm (5 ft 7 in)
- Weight: 69 kg (152 lb)

Playing career^{1}
Years	Club	Games (Goals)
1922–23, 1925	Carlton	16 (2)
- ^{1} Playing statistics correct to the end of 1925.

Joe Russell (17 March 1898 – 10 April 1976) was an Australian rules footballer who played with Carlton in the Victorian Football League (VFL).
