= Robert D. Russell =

Robert D. (Bob) Russell is professor of mathematics at Simon Fraser University.

Russell together with Uri Ascher and Robert Mattheij is the author of the seminal Numerical Solution of Boundary Value Problems for Ordinary Differential Equations which was subsequently republished as a SIAM Classic. His latest book is Adaptive Moving Mesh Methods with Weizhang Huang

In 2009 Russell was made a SIAM Fellow for his contributions to the numerical analysis of differential equations.

== Notable publications ==
- Numerical Solution of Boundary Value Problems for Ordinary Differential Equations (1988) with Uri M. Ascher and Robert M. Mattheij.
- Adaptive Moving Mesh Methods (2011) with Weizhang Huang.

== PhD students ==
- Luca Dieci, University of New Mexico, 1986
- Yuhe Ren, Simon Fraser University, 1991
- Lixin Liu, Simon Fraser University, 1993
- Kossi Edoh, Simon Fraser University, 1995
- Daryl Hepting, Simon Fraser University, 1999
- Michael Lunney, Simon Fraser University, 2000
- Shaohua Chen, Simon Fraser University, 2000
- Ronald Haynes, Simon Fraser University, 2003
- Benjamin Ong, Simon Fraser University, 2007
- Mohamed Sulman, Simon Fraser University, 2008
- Xiangmin Xu, Simon Fraser University, 2008
