= Tom Russell (footballer, born 1909) =

Scottish footballer

Personal information
- Full name: Thomas Russell
- Date of birth: 23 November 1909
- Place of birth: Cowdenbeath, Scotland
- Date of death: February 1975 (aged 65)
- Height: 5 ft 9 in (1.75 m)
- Position: Left back

Senior career*
Years	Team	Apps	(Gls)
–1929	Cowdenbeath Wednesday		
1929–1933	Cowdenbeath	81	(0)
1933–1934	Rangers	8	(0)
1934–1937	Newcastle United	7	(0)
1937–1938	Horden Colliery Welfare		
- * Club domestic league appearances and goals

Thomas Russell (23 November 1909 – February 1975) was a Scottish professional footballer who played in the Scottish League for Cowdenbeath and Rangers as a left back. He also played in the Football League for Newcastle United. After his retirement, Russell became secretary at Cowdenbeath.

== Personal life ==
Russell lost both his legs in 1971.

== Career statistics ==
Appearances and goals by club, season and competition
Club	Season	League			National Cup		Total	
Club	Season	Division	Apps	Goals	Apps	Goals	Apps	Goals
Cowdenbeath	1928–29	Scottish First Division	1	0	0	0	1	0
Cowdenbeath	1929–30	Scottish First Division	4	0	5	0	9	0
Cowdenbeath	1930–31	Scottish First Division	32	0	0	0	32	0
Cowdenbeath	1931–32	Scottish First Division	33	0	2	0	35	0
Cowdenbeath	1932–33	Scottish First Division	11	0	2	0	13	0
Cowdenbeath	Total		81	0	9	0	90	0
Rangers	1932–33	Scottish First Division	5	0	0	0	5	0
Rangers	1933–34	Scottish First Division	3	0	1	0	4	0
Rangers	Total		8	0	1	0	9	0
Newcastle United	1934–35	Second Division	7	0	0	0	7	0
Career total			96	0	10	0	106	0

== Honours ==
- Cowdenbeath Hall of Fame
