= Scott Russell =

Scott Russell may refer to:

- John Scott Russell (1808–1882), known as J. Scott Russell, Scottish naval engineer
- Scott Russell (javelin thrower) (born 1979), male javelin thrower
- Scott Russell (motorcyclist) (born 1964), American motorcycle road racer
- Scott Russell (commentator) (born 1958), commentator for CBC, Hockey Night in Canada and figure skating
- Scott Russell (executive), Australian businessman, current CEO of NICE Ltd, former SAP executive
- Scott Russell (footballer) (born 1970), Australian football player
- Scott Russell (tenor) (1868–1949), English singer, actor and theatre manager

== See also ==
- Russell Scott (1921–2012), American clown
- Scott Russell linkage, converts linear motion, to (almost) linear motion in a line perpendicular to the input
