= Frances Russell =

Canadian author (1941–2022)

Frances Russell (11 November 1941 – 30 September 2022) was a Canadian author and journalist. She was a columnist for the Winnipeg Free Press newspaper from 1981–1999 and has written two books: Mistehay Sakahegan – The Great Lake and The Canadian Crucible – Manitoba’s Role in Canada’s Great Divide.
