= Michael Russell (psychiatrist) =

British psychiatrist (1932-2009)

Michael Anthony Hamilton Russell
- Born: 9 March 1932; Cape Town, South Africa
- Died: 16 July 2009; Cape Town, South Africa
- Citizenship: South African / British
- Occupation: Psychiatrist

Academic background
- Education: University of Oxford; Guy's Hospital Medical School

Academic work
- Discipline: Psychiatry
- Sub-discipline: Addiction
- Institutions: Institute of Psychiatry

Michael Anthony Hamilton Russell (9 March 1932 – 16 July 2009) was a public health scientist and psychiatrist with particular expertise in the field of cigarette smoking for which he identified nicotine as the key factor in tobacco dependence.

== Career ==
Russell was born in Cape Town, South Africa on 9 March 1932. He first studied law before switching to medicine at the University of Oxford and did his clinical training at Guy’s Hospital Medical School, London. Returning to South Africa he worked as a junior doctor at Groote Schuur Hospital where he decided to specialise in psychiatry. He returned to London to train at the Maudsley Hospital.

He began his research career in Griffith Edwards’ Addiction Research Unit in the Institute of Psychiatry. He received a programme grant from Medical Research Council to focus his research on the psychopharmacology of smoking. He was appointed professor of addiction in 1986, and his work at the Maudsley continued until 1998.

In his retirement he returned to South Africa where he died 16 July 2009.

== Research ==
Russell’s whole research career centred around understanding tobacco dependence. In his training as a psychiatrist, he wrote his research thesis on smoking in 1967. He proceeded from this to write an influential paper in 1971 identifying nicotine as the key factor underlying tobacco dependence.

He went on to explore a range of treatments to encourage smoking cessation.

== Key publications ==
=== Smoking related articles ===
- Tonnesen, P., Paoletti, P., Gustavsson, G., Russell, M.A.H., Saracci, R., & Gulsvik, A. (1999). Higher dosage nicotine patches increase one-year smoking cessation rates: results from the European CEASE trial. Collaborative European Anti-Smoking Evaluation. European. European Respiratory Journal 13 (2), 238-246
- Cohen, S., Tyrell, D.A., Russell, M.A.H., Jarvis, M.J., & Smith, A.P. (1993). Smoking, alcohol consumption, and susceptibility to the common cold. American journal of public health 83 (9), 1277-1283
- Sutherland, G., Stapleton, J.A., Russell, M.A.H., Jarvis, M.J., Hajek, P., & Belcher, M. (1992)/ Randomised controlled trial of nasal nicotine spray in smoking cessation. The Lancet 340 (8815), 324-329
- Russell, M.A.H. (1990). Smoking and human behavior. Biological psychology, 30 (1), 91-94
- Russell, M.A.H., & Feyerabend, C. (1990). Cigarette smoking: a dependence on high-nicotine boli. Drug Metabolism Reviews 8 (1), 29-57
- Jarvis, M.J., & Russell, M.A.H. (1989). Treatment for the cigarette smoker. International review of psychiatry 1 (1-2), 139-147
- Russell, M.A., Merriman, R., Stapleton, J., & Taylor, W. (1983). Effect of nicotine chewing gum as an adjunct to general practitioner's advice against smoking. BMJ (Clin Res Ed) 287 (6407), 1782-1785.
- West, R.J., & Russell, M.A.H. (1985). Pre-abstinence smoke intake and smoking motivation as predictors of severity of cigarette withdrawal symptoms. Psychopharmacologia, 87 (3), 334-336.
- Jarvis, M.J., Raw, M., Russell, M.A.H., & Fererabend, C. (1982). Randomised controlled trial of nicotine chewing-gum. BMJ (Clin Res Ed) 285 (6341), 537-540
- Jarvis, M.J., Russell, M.A., & Saloojee, Y. (1980). Expired air carbon monoxide: a simple breath test of tobacco smoke intake. BMJ, 281 (6238), 484
- Russell, M.A.H., Wilson, C., Taylor, C., & Baker, C.D. (1979). Effect of general practitioners' advice against smoking. BMJ, 2 (6184), 231-235
- Russell, M.A.H., Jarvis, M., Iyer, R., & Feyerabend, C. (1979). Relation of nicotine yield of cigarettes to blood nicotine concentrations in smokers. BMJ, 280 (6219), 972-976
- Feyerabend, C., Russell, M.A.H. (1978)A rapid gas‐liquid chromatographic method for the determination of cotinine and nicotine in biological fluids. Journal of Pharmacy and Pharmacology 42 (6), 450-452.
- Russell, M.A.H., Wilson, C., Feyerabend, C., & Cole, P.V. (1976). Effect of nicotine chewing gum on smoking behaviour and as an aid to cigarette withdrawal. BMJ, 2, 391-393.
- Russell, M.A., Feyerabend, C. & Cole, P.V. (1976).Plasma nicotine levels after cigarette smoking and chewing nicotine gum. Br Med J 1 (6017), 1043-1046
- Russell, M.A.H. (1976). Low-tar medium-nicotine cigarettes: a new approach to safer smoking. BMJ 1 (6023), 1430-1433
- Russell, M.A.H., Peto, J., & Patel, U.A. (1974). The classification of smoking by factorial structure of motives. Journal of the Royal Statistical Society Series A: Statistics in Society 137
- Russell, M.A.H. (1971). Cigarette smoking: natural history of a dependence disorder. British Journal of Medical Psychology, 44, 1.
- Russell, M.A.H. (1970). Effect of electric aversion on cigarette smoking. BMJ, 1, 82-86.

=== Other articles ===
- George, M.J., Russell, M.A., Piontak, J.R., & Odgers, C.L. (2018). Concurrent and subsequent associations between daily digital technology use and high-risk adolescents’ mental health symptoms. Child development 89 (1), 78-88
- Odgers, C.L., Caspi, A., Russell, M.A., Sampson, R.J., Arseneault, L., Moffitt, T.E. (2012). Supportive parenting mediates neighborhood socioeconomic disparities in children's antisocial behavior from ages 5 to 12. Development and psychopathology 24 (3), 705-721
