= Arthur Russell (disambiguation) =

Arthur Russell (1951–1992) was an American cellist, composer, singer, and disco artist.

Arthur Russell may refer to:

- Arthur Russell, 2nd Baron Ampthill (1869–1935), British administrator and rower
- Arthur Russell (athlete) (1886–1972), British athlete
- Lord Arthur Russell (1825–1892), British Member of Parliament
- Sir Arthur Russell, 6th Baronet (1878–1964), British mineralogist
- Arthur Tozer Russell (1806–1874), English clergyman and hymn writer
- Arthur Russell, character in 1935 film Alice Adams
