= Vaughan Russell =

Scottish footballer

Personal information
- Full name: Joseph Vaughan Russell
- Date of birth: 13 January 1890
- Place of birth: Kinning Park, Scotland
- Date of death: 1979 (aged 89)
- Place of death: Glasgow, Scotland
- Position: Centre forward

Senior career*
Years	Team	Apps	(Gls)
1913–1915	Queen's Park	0	(0)
1919–1920	Queen's Park	12	(1)
- * Club domestic league appearances and goals

Joseph Vaughan Russell (13 January 1890 – 1979) was a Scottish amateur footballer who played as a centre forward in the Scottish League for Queen's Park.

== Personal life ==
Russell worked as a commercial traveller. He served as a private in the Scottish Horse and as a sergeant in the Royal Engineers during the First World War, which included service in Egypt. Russell later had a successful business career, becoming a director of Charles Tennant & Co and managing the Lochaline optical glass mine during the Second World War.

== Career statistics ==
Appearances and goals by club, season and competition
Club	Season	League			Scottish Cup		Total	
Club	Season	Division	Apps	Goals	Apps	Goals	Apps	Goals
Queen's Park	1919–20	Scottish First Division	12	1	0	0	12	1
Career total			12	1	0	0	12	1
