= Colin Russell =

Colin Russell may refer to:

- Colin Russell (EastEnders), character in EastEnders
- Colin A. Russell (1928–2013), Emeritus Professor of History of Science and Technology at the Open University
- Colin Russell (swimmer) (born 1984), Canadian swimmer
- Colin Russell (footballer) (born 1961), English former footballer
