= Anthony Russel =

English portrait painter (c.1663–1743)

Anthony or Antony Russel (c. 1663–1743) was an English portrait-painter.

== Life ==
Antony Russel, son of the painter Theodore Russel, carried on the family tradition of portrait-painting, and is said to have studied under John Riley. A portrait by him of the famous Dr. Sacheverell, painted in 1710, was engraved in mezzotint by John Smith.

He was an intimate friend of George Vertue, who engraved some of his portraits, and he supplied Vertue with many biographical notes concerning artists of the seventeenth century, which are now embodied in Walpole's Anecdotes of Painting.

He died in London in July 1743, aged about eighty.
