= Rusty Russell (disambiguation) =

Rusty pen may refer to:

- Barry Russell (born 1977), Australian software programmer
- Rusty Russell (tackle) (born 1963), American football player
- Rusty Russell (American football coach) (1895–1983), American football coach
