= Elizabeth Russell =

Elizabeth Russell may refer to:

- Elizabeth Cooke, Lady Russell (1528–1609), associate of Elizabeth I of England
- Elizabeth Russell, Duchess of Bedford (1818–1897), bridesmaid to Queen Victoria
- Elizabeth von Arnim (1866–1941), German author sometimes known by her married name
- Elizabeth Russell (actress) (1916–2002), American actress
- Elizabeth S. Russell (1913–2001), American geneticist
- Elizabeth Russell (Upper Canada) (1754-1822), United Empire Loyalist, brother of Peter Russell, Inspector General of Upper Canada
- Elizabeth Russell (cricketer) (born 1994), English cricketer
- Elizabeth Russell (missionary) (1836–1928), American missionary and educator
- Elizabeth Augusta Russell, American philanthropist and reformer
- Elizabeth Henry Campbell Russell (1749–1825), Methodist lay leader
- Betsy Russell (Elizabeth Russell, born 1963), American actress

== See also ==
- Betty Russell (1924–1985), American baseball player
