= Philip Russell =

Philip Russell or Phillip Russell may refer to:

- Phil Russell (ice hockey) (born 1952), Canadian ice hockey player
- Phil Russell, a.k.a. Wally Hope (1947–1975), co-founder of the Windsor Free and Stonehenge free festivals
- Philip Russell (physicist) (born 1953), researcher into photonics and new materials
- Philip Russell (cricketer) (born 1944), Derbyshire cricketer, 1965–1985
- Philip Russell (bishop) (1919–2013), Archbishop of Cape Town, South Africa, 1980–1986
- P. Craig Russell (born 1951), American comic book writer, artist, and illustrator
- Phillip Russell (general), American arbovirologist
