= C. E. Russell (politician) =

American politician (1921–2010)

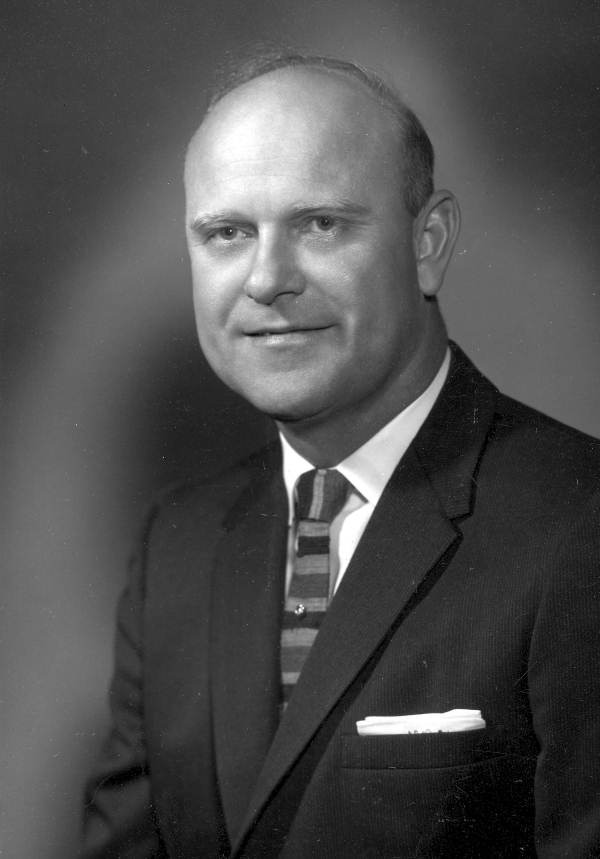
- Russell in 1962

Member of the Florida House of Representatives from Madison County
- In office 1962–1966

Personal details
- Born: September 11, 1921 Apalachicola, Florida, U.S.
- Died: March 22, 2010 (aged 87)
- Party: Democratic
- Education: University of Georgia; Utah State University

C. E. Russell (September 11, 1921 – March 22, 2010) was an American politician. He served as a Democratic member of the Florida House of Representatives.

== Life and career ==
Russell was born in Apalachicola, Florida. He attended the University of Georgia and Utah State University. He served in World War II and was a member of The Church of Jesus Christ of Latter-day Saints.

In 1962, Russell was elected to the Florida House of Representatives winning over the incumbent Otis R. Peavy and he served until 1966.

Russell died on March 22, 2010, at the age of 87.
