= Steve Russell =

Steve or Steven Russell may refer to:

- Steve Russell (politician) (born 1963), American politician in Oklahoma
- Steve Russell (computer scientist) (born 1937), American computer scientist
- Steve Russell (writer), Cherokee journalist and academic
- Steve Russell (cricketer) (born 1968), Australian cricketer
- Steven Jay Russell (born 1957), American con artist
- Steve Russell, member of R&B group Troop

== See also ==
- Stephen Russell (disambiguation)
