= Gilbert Russell =

Gilbert Russell may refer to:

- Gilbert Byng Alwyne Russell (1875–1942), British banker and military man
- Val Rosing (1910–1969), British dance band singer, also known as Gilbert Russell
- Gilbert C. Russell (1782–1861), American military officer
