= Sam Russell =

Sam Russell may refer to:

- Sam M. Russell (1889–1971), U.S. Representative from Texas
- Sam W. Russell (1945–2014), American lawyer and politician
- Sam Russell (footballer, born 1900) (1900–1959), Irish football player
- Sam Russell (footballer, born 1982), English football player for Grimsby Town
- Sam Lesser (1915–2010), journalist who used the byline Sam Russell

== See also ==
- Samuel Russell (disambiguation)
