= Francis Russell (art historian) =

British travel writer, historian and art expert

Francis Russell (born 1949) is a British travel writer, historian and art expert.

He was educated at the Dragon School, Westminster and Christ Church, Oxford, where he read history. Russell's maternal grandfather was the chemist and mountaineer George Ingle Finch; both his father, the botanist and Arctic explorer Robert Scott Russell, and his brother were also mountaineers.

Russell joined Christie's as a specialist in 1972, initially in the Department of Old Master Drawings and later in Old Master Pictures. He is a former Head of the International Old Master Picture Department. He advised Gervase Jackson-Stops on the selection of paintings and assisted on the catalogue for the Treasure Houses of Britain exhibition at the National Gallery of Art, Washington, D.C., and has published discoveries by artists as varied as Fra Angelico, Pontormo and Wright of Derby.

Considered one of the world's leading experts on Early Italian Renaissance gold-ground painting, Russell was a friend and frequent correspondent of Miklós Boskovits and Everett Fahy. He is also an expert on Italian Seicento and Settecento painting, especially Venetian vedute by artists such as Canaletto and Guardi, and on British eighteenth-century art history. His first published monograph was a catalogue of the iconography of Sir Walter Scott.

== Books and articles by Francis Russell ==
- Portraits of Sir Walter Scott: A study of romantic portraiture, London, 1987.
- John, 3rd Earl of Bute: Patron and Collector, London, Merrion Press, 2004.
- 52 Italian Places: A Pocket Grand Tour, London and Turin, Umberto Allemandi, 2007; 2nd edition, 101 Places in Italy: A private Grand Tour, London, Wilmington Square, 2014; 3rd edition, Places in Italy: A private Grand Tour. 150 essential places to visit, 1001 unforgettable works of art, London, Wilmington Square, 2019.
- Places in Turkey: A pocket Grand Tour, London, Frances Lincoln, 2010; 2nd edition, 123 places in Turkey: A private grand tour, London, Wilmington Square, 2017.
- Places in Syria: A pocket Grand Tour, London, Frances Lincoln, 2011.
- Places in Jordan: A pocket Grand Tour, London, Frances Lincoln, 2012.

Russell has contributed to The Burlington Magazine, Country Life and Cornucopia. His contributions to The Burlington number more than 79 individual titles.
