= National Government candidates in the 1940 Canadian federal election =

The Conservative Party of Canada fielded 207 candidates in the 1940 Canadian federal election, and elected 39 members to retain its status as the official opposition party.

Party leader Robert Manion advocated a wartime national unity government for Canada. For this reason, most Conservative candidates appeared on the ballot as the "National Government" option. As it happened, Liberals under William Lyon Mackenzie King won a majority government and did not invite other parties into a wartime coalition. The "National Government" named was dropped after the election.

== Alberta ==
=== Wetaskiwin: Charles Homer Russell ===
Charles Homer Russell (July 29, 1877 – 1952) was born in Exeter, Ontario. He received a Bachelor of Arts degree from the University of Toronto (1903) before moving to Alberta to work as a teacher. He finished his legal studies in 1914, and was called to the bar in the same year. He then moved to Wetaskiwin to co-found the firm of Odell & Russell, and worked as a barrister and solicitor. He was a Presbyterian and a freemason, and was the chair of his local hospital board.

Russell was a frequent candidate for the Conservative Party, running in a total of four elections.

Electoral record
Election	Division	Party	Votes	%	Place	Winner
1925 federal	Wetaskiwin	Conservative	2,121		3/3	Stanley Gilbert Tobin, Liberal
1926 federal	Wetaskiwin	Conservative	2,243		3/3	William Irvine, United Farmers
1930 federal	Wetaskiwin	Conservative	4,326		2/3	William Irvine, United Farmers
1940 federal	Wetaskiwin	National Government	2,456	15.71	4/4	Norman Jaques, Social Credit
