= Harry Russell =

Harry Russell may refer to:

- Harry Russell (rugby league), rugby league footballer who played in the 1930s
- Harry Russell (footballer), English footballer
- Harry Luman Russell (1866–1954), American bacteriologist and educator
- Harry F. Russell (1890–1972), American politician from Nebraska
- Scott Russell (tenor) (Harry Henry Russell, 1868–1949), English singer, actor and theatre manager
