= Tom Russell (ice hockey) =

Canadian ice hockey player (born 1929)

- Born: 1929 (age 96–97) Hamilton, Ontario, Canada
- Position: Center
- Shot: Left
- Played for: Sudbury Wolves; Ayr Raiders
- National team: Canada
- Playing career: 1946–1950
Medal record
Men's ice hockey
Silver medal – second place	1949 Stockholm	Ice hockey

Thomas Russell (born 1929) is a Canadian retired ice hockey player with the Sudbury Wolves. He won a silver medal at the 1949 World Ice Hockey Championships in Stockholm, Sweden. He also played with the Ayr Raiders in Scotland.
