= Ian Russell =

Ian Russell may refer to:

- Ian Russell (soccer) (born 1975), American soccer player
- Ian Russell (rugby league) (born 1965), Australian rugby league player
- Ian Russell, 13th Duke of Bedford (1917–2002), British peer and writer
- Ian Russell (priest) (1934–2021), archdeacon of Coventry and honorary chaplain to the Queen
- Ian Russell (folklorist) (1947–2026), British folklorist

== See also ==
- Iain Russell (born 1982), Scottish footballer
