= Darrell Russell =

Darrell Russell may refer to:

- Darrell Russell (drag racer) (1968–2004), former NHRA rookie of the year killed in a car crash during a race
- Darrell Russell (American football) (1976–2005), former NFL Pro Bowl defensive lineman killed in a car crash
- Darel Russell (born 1980), English football player
