= Joe Russell (New Hampshire politician) =

American politician

Member of the New Hampshire House of Representatives from the Rockingham 13th district
- In office 2008–2010

Personal details
- Party: Democratic

Joe Russell is an American politician. A member of the Democratic Party, he served in the New Hampshire House of Representatives from 2008 to 2010.
