= Leonard Russell =

Leonard Russell may refer to:

- Leonard Russell (American football) (born 1969), American football player
- Leonard J. Russell (philosopher) (1884–1971), British logician and academic
- Leonard J. Russell (politician) (1932–1985), American politician; mayor of Cambridge, Massachusetts
- Leonard Russell (journalist), British journalist
