= Bob Russell (Australian footballer) =

Australian rules footballer

Personal information
- Full name: Bob Russell
- Born: 4 October 1945 (age 81)
- Original team: Mortlake
- Height: 188 cm (6 ft 2 in)
- Weight: 82 kg (181 lb)

Playing career^{1}
| Years | Club | Games (Goals) |
| 1966 | Melbourne | 2 (0) |
- ^{1} Playing statistics correct to the end of 1966.

Bob Russell (born 4 October 1945) is a former Australian rules footballer who played with Melbourne in the Victorian Football League (VFL).
