= Elam W. Russell Sr. =

American politician

Member of the Missouri House of Representatives from the Cape Girardeau County district

Personal details
- Born: February 8, 1828 Cape Girardeau County, Missouri
- Died: April 2, 1897 (aged 69) Cape Girardeau County, Missouri
- Party: Democratic

Elam W. Russell Sr. (February 8, 1828 – April 2, 1897) was an American politician from the state of Missouri. He was the son of the Honorable James and Elizabeth Gilliland Russell and the grandson of William Russell who was born in Scotland.

In 1851, he was appointed county surveyor and served in that office until 1855. In March 1857, he married Cape Girardeau County-native Nercena Clodfelter. In 1858, he was elected as sheriff and collector and served in these offices until 1861. In 1880, he was elected to serve Cape Girardeau County in the state legislature. In 1892, he was defeated for re-election to the office of state representative by Republican John J. Sawyer, 2206 to 1989 votes. He had been the first president of the Jackson Exchange Bank at the time of his death.

His son Robert W. Russell later became the mayor of Jackson, Missouri.
