= Archibald Russell (disambiguation) =

Archibald Russell (1904–1995) was an aeronautical engineer who served as chief designer for the Bristol Aeroplane Company.

Archibald Russell may also refer to:

- Archibald G. B. Russell (1879–1955), British historian and King of Arms
- Archibald D. Russell (1853–1919), American financier and philanthropist
- Archibald Russell (ship), a 1905 tall ship built by Scotts Shipbuilding and Engineering Company
