= Diana Russell =

Diana Russell may refer to:

- Diana Russell, Duchess of Bedford (1710–1735), member of the Spencer family known for the unsuccessful attempt of marriage with Frederick, Prince of Wales
- Caroline Diana Rosalind Russell, a.k.a. Diana Russell (1874–1971), English noblewoman
- Diana E. H. Russell (1938–2020), feminist writer and activist

== See also ==
- Diane Russell, member of the Maine House of Representatives
- Diane Russell (NYPD Blue)
