= Andrew Russell (academic) =

Andrew Russell is professor of politics at the University of Liverpool. At Liverpool, he served as Head of the Department for Politics from 2017 until 2022. He is a specialist on the British Liberal Democrats party and on young people.

== Education ==
Russell studied politics and history at the University of Loughborough before completing an MA in political behaviour at the University of Essex. He received his a PhD from the University of Sheffield for a thesis on spatial variation in economic attitudes and voting behaviour.

== Career ==
Russell began his career as lecturer in politics at the University of Leeds before moving to the University of Manchester in 1994 where he became a professor in 2011 and served as head of department from 2012 to 2015. He moved to the University of Liverpool in 2017 to become head of department until 2022.

He is a specialist on the British Liberal Democrats party and on young people. In 2004, he was the academic representative on the Electoral Commission's review of the minimum age of candidature and voting in UK elections. With Steve de Wijze he is the co-editor of the journal Representation.

In 2012, the Political Studies Association awarded Russell the Bernard Crick Prize for Outstanding Teaching.
