= Andy Russell (Canadian author) =

Canadian wilderness guide

Andrew G. A. Russell, CM (1915 – June 1, 2005) was a Canadian wilderness guide, outfitter, author, photographer, filmmaker, rancher, conservationist, and environmentalist. In recognition of his environmental advocacy he received honorary degrees from the University of Lethbridge, the University of Calgary, and the University of Alberta. In 1976, he received the Julian T. Crandall Award for his efforts in conservation, and in 1977 he was presented with the Order of Canada by the Governor General of Canada.

== Early life ==
Russell was born in 1915 in Lethbridge, Alberta, Canada. His parents ranched on the prairies southwest of the city until 1919, when they moved to the foot of the Rocky Mountains near Drywood Creek, north of what is now Waterton Lakes National Park. Russell attended the rural Drywood School; later he boarded in Lethbridge to complete tenth grade and part of the eleventh grade. Later in life would describe his schooling as "limited formal variety, considerable Rocky Mountain variety." At sixteen Russell went to work, initially as an agricultural hand and then as a trapper. But unlike other trappers, Russell was not simply interested in making money; he was curious about the animals. He read everything he could about the habits of the animals of the Rocky Mountains.

== Career ==
In 1936, Russell began training horses for Frederick Herbert (Bert) Riggall. As a local outfitter, Riggall had been leading hunters and tourists into the Rocky Mountains of southwestern Alberta and southeastern British Columbia since 1909. Riggall was, according to Russell, "a master hunter...[and] a great naturalist and botanist...with a good sound layman's grounding in geology and natural history." In 1938, Russell married Riggall's daughter Kay Riggall. Together they had five children: Dick, Charlie, John, Gordon, and Anne. Russell became a partner of his father-in-law's business in 1939, took ownership in 1946, and continued operations until 1960. During the years that Russell operated the Skyline Saddle Horse and Packtrain Company, he developed a solid reputation as a guide and outfitter. His clients included, among others, Warren Page, the gun editor at Field & Stream Magazine, and Viscount Harold Alexander, the Governor General of Canada. He also secured an exclusive contract to provide outfitting and guiding services for guests staying at the Great Northern Railway's Prince of Wales Hotel in Waterton Lakes National Park. At the same time, he continued providing outfitting services to private clients, including several families from Minneapolis who had first hired the outfit decades earlier when Riggall was still owner.

By the early 1950s, Russell could see that there was little future in the guiding and outfitting business. The construction of all-weather roads made the mountains of southwestern Alberta and southeastern British Columbia increasingly accessible to automobile travel. Additionally, industrial activities, such as petroleum development and timber harvesting, had compromised the aesthetic value of much of the anti-modern wilderness landscapes that comprised Russell's traditional guiding territory. Human pressures upon the environment increased as more and more people were competing to use the same land for various, often incompatible, purposes. The inevitable land-use conflicts that arose ensured that provincial officials figured more prominently into the overall management of the region. Reflecting on those years, Russell would later lament that he was "regulated out of business." To adapt to the evolving situation, Russell exchanged his rifle for a camera and a pen. He began to write articles and books, create films, and give public lectures. His goal was to bring people around to the understanding that humans "are only a part of nature, a portion of a vast ecosystem." "Every time," he wrote, "that man walks into his home, turns a tap, eats, puts on clothes or drives a car, he is calling on nature for the means to his way of life. The mere fact that most of what he sees or touches are manufactured things does not change the picture by even a hair. For all the raw products used by man are supplied by nature."

Russell was not new to the world of writing and publishing. At least since 1945 he had been submitting articles on hunting, "outdoor life," and natural history for publication in popular magazines. Sometimes these were written simply to provide readers with trip reports, equipment reviews, and descriptions of technique, but more often the articles were normative in tone and written to persuade readers to rethink their understanding of, and their relationship with, wildlife and wildlife habitats. In an article published in 1946 in Natural History Magazine, for example, Russell argued that wildlife behaviour was not solely an instinctual response (as was often assumed), but rather was in part, and even primarily, the result of reflective thought processes made possible by a "well-developed brain." By the late 1940s, Russell was making intermittent editorial submissions to the Lethbridge Herald, and beginning in 1952 he began making regular submissions with a column entitled "Andy Russell's Sports Afield." In these articles he continued to encourage his readers to rethink their relationship with wildlife and wildlife habitat, reminding them of the possibility that the conservation of wildlife and wildlife habitat could result in important human benefits, including the enhancement of socio-economic wellbeing.

Russell also became a filmmaker in the early 1950s, having learned the basics of the craft from the wealthy clients that he guided in the previous decades. His first serious effort as a filmmaker, over a dedicated period of seventeen months in the early 1950s, allowed him to record over 4,000 metres (13,000 ft) of film capturing the habits of mountain sheep, largely in the area of Waterton Lakes National Park. By 1953, he was delivering that colour film as a public lecture to sold-out halls in numerous communities in southwestern Alberta and southeastern British Columbia, as well as to audiences in several American cities, including Minneapolis, Detroit, New York, and Chicago. This film was lengthened and in 1954 was delivered as "Wildlife in the Canadian Rockies"; it was designed to "promote good conservation measures and to remind people of the value of Canadian Wildlife."

Beginning in 1961 Russell, along with his oldest sons, Dick and Charlie, devoted three summers to intensive wildlife filming, focusing their attention on grizzly bears. They began near their home, collecting footage from Waterton Lakes National Park and the Akamina-Kishinena region of southeast British Columbia, before moving on to the Rogers Pass area in Glacier National Park. Ultimately, their focus on grizzly bears determined that they had to go much further north – to northern British Columbia, the Yukon Territory, and finally into Alaska and the central mountain ranges of McKinley (Denali) National Park. Russell was particularly motivated to present the "true character" of an animal that, in his opinion, had been unfairly maligned by public opinion. To establish the "desired atmosphere and proper protocol," Russell and his sons – much to the surprise of onlookers – began to leave their rifles behind during the second season, believing that "having a gun within reach, cached somewhere in a pack or a hidden holster, causes a man to act with unconscious arrogance and thus maybe to smell different or to transmit some kind of signal objectionable to bears." Russell wrote about those experiences capturing grizzly bear images and film in Grizzly Country, a work of creative non-fiction that was published by New York-based Alfred A. Knopf, Inc. in 1967. Sales from the book provided the financial resources that allowed Russell to finally edit and produce the film footage that he, Dick, and Charlie had collected between 1961 and 1964. In 1969, Russell began publicly presenting Grizzly Country, a narrated silent film that he presented in lecture halls throughout North America. When asked about his purpose, Russell explained that the film and the accompanying lecture were not only about wildlife habits, but also about "driv[ing] home a message that much of the wilderness area of Canada...is rapidly disappearing."

Russell worked hard to take his message of conservation and preservation to a wider audience. In the process he sometimes explicitly entered the arena of politics. For example, when Russell learned in 1971 of the Alberta government's "Prime Plan" to mechanically join the Peace, Saskatchewan, and Missouri watersheds, he criticized the scheme during a provincial election campaign as he delivered Grizzly Country to audiences around Alberta. A self-professed Liberal, Russell also contested an election himself, running as a candidate in the Lethbridge riding for Pierre Trudeau's Liberals in the 1972 general election. Although unsuccessful in his election bid, he was perhaps the first candidate in Canada to run on a platform that was "totally environmental." At the same time Russell's renown as an author increased considerably based on the success of Grizzly Country, and as a result Angus Cameron, his editor at Alfred A. Knopf, Inc., asked for more. Trails of a Wilderness Wanderer was published in 1971 and was followed by Horns in the High Country in 1973. In both books Russell continued to advocate on behalf of wildlife and to give moral prescriptions that outlined how humans might develop a more virtuous relationship with their environments. Beginning in July 1971 and continuing until November 1974, Russell contributed 120 articles to the Lethbridge Herald as part of his "Ecological Series."

== Environmental activism ==
Russell also sometimes confronted environmental issues in the field. In 1977, for example, he was successful in persuading officials in British Columbia to reconsider plans to grant timber harvesting licences in the Akamina-Kishenina region, an area with which Russell was intimately familiar as a result of the decades he spent guiding and outfitting in the area. While wilderness landscapes like the Akamina-Kishenina region were central to Russell's writing and film-making endeavours, he also directed some of his environmental advocacy to the rural working landscape he shared with his neighbours. For example, when Shell Canada in 1970 put forward an application to divert additional water from Drywood Creek, Russell monitored the proceedings to ensure than no more water was taken than necessary, and that the resulting effluent was properly treated. In another instance, to draw attention to problems with the Government of Alberta's use of sodium fluoroacetate as a predator control compound, he joined with two of his ranching colleagues to gather ten poisoned and rotting coyote carcasses; these were then left on the grounds of the municipal office in Pincher Creek, Alberta, to draw public attention to the issue through prearranged media involvement. Russell also involved himself in larger projects, including in the politically charged opposition to the construction of the Oldman River Dam in southwestern Alberta. He was a founding member of the Friends of the Oldman River and he participated in actions to oppose the dam project, most prominently as a speaker at musician Ian Tyson's benefit concert held at Maycroft Crossing on June 12, 1989.

== Further book publishing ==
Russell's first successful titles with Alfred A. Knopf Inc. were followed by The High West in 1974 and The Rockies in 1975, both of which were collaborative efforts in which Russell was paired with well-known photographers to promote the wild landscapes of western North America. Memoirs of a Mountain Man, which was part memoir and part autobiography, was published 1984. In 1987, Russell brought awareness to the human and environmental impacts of the Oldman River Dam project with The Life of a River. He returned to his storytelling roots with the publication of Andy Russell's Adventures with Wild Animals in 1978, The Canadian Cowboy: Stories of Cows, Cowboys, and Cayuses in 1993, and finally in 1998 Andy Russell's Campfire Stories. Beginning in 1972 and continuing until 1981, Russell was a regular feature on Alberta radio stations with "Our Alberta Heritage," a series of 60-second clips on regional history that were sponsored by Calgary Power and produced by Baker Lovick Advertising Limited. Despite the corporate sponsorship, he occasionally took advantage of the opportunity to promote "ecology," in one instance pointing out that "people throughout the world are worried that Man, his technology outstripping his horse sense, is quickly converting his environment to one vast garbage dump."

By the mid-1990s, as he entered his eighth decade, Russell became less directly involved in issues of environmental management. However, he did continue to express interest in land use in the foothills region of southwestern Alberta. His influence among conservationist and environmentalists continued. In 2000, he hosted representatives from the Nature Conservancy of Canada and several other organizations at Hawk's Nest, his home on Indian Springs Ridge near the northeastern boundary of Waterton Lakes National Park. Their purpose was to combine their resources and influence to ensure that the surrounding area would not be subdivided into recreational residential properties.

Russell's career came to a close with his death on June 1, 2005. As an indication of his influence in Alberta and beyond, one of the speakers at his memorial was fellow maverick and then-Premier of Alberta, Ralph Klein.

== Legacy ==
A partnership of environmental groups is calling on the Government of Alberta to establish the Andy Russell – I'tai sah kòp Wildland and Provincial Park to celebrate the memory of Russell and to recognize the historical and contemporary presence of the Piikani First Nation. Such a park would provide enhanced legislative protection to roughly 1,040 square kilometres of wild country in the area of the Castle River watershed north of Waterton Lakes National Park. As noted by the Castle-Crown Wilderness Coalition, the proposed protected area is desirable because it "would give generations to come the chance to experience the western wilderness Andy and Kay loved [as well as] a place to imagine the pioneer outfitting and ranching heritage they typified."

In 1995, Russell's collection of letters and associated materials were acquired by the Whyte Museum of the Canadian Rockies. The Andy Russell Fonds contains six lineal metres of textual records, 6100 photographs, 29 films, and five sound recordings.
