= Kenneth Russell =

Ken or Kenneth Russell may refer to:

- Kenneth William Russell, British pilot, see 1951 New Year Honours
- Ken Russell (1927–2011), English film director
- Ken Russell (American football) (1935–2014), tackle for Detroit Lions from 1957 to 1959
- Ken Russell (politician) (born 1973), American Democratic politician, member of Miami City Commission from 2015 to 2022
- Kenneth Russell (Jamaican politician), Member of Parliament
- Kenneth S. Russell, Australian astronomer, active since 1963, discoverer of comets 83D/Russell, 91P/Russell and 94P/Russell
- Kenneth W. Russell (1950–1992), American anthropologist after whom fellowship at American Center of Oriental Research is named
- Kenneth Charles Russell (1951–1993), American jockey after whom Ken Russell Memorial Classic is named
- Kenneth Russell, Bahamian MP, successful candidate in Bahamian general election, 1997 and 2002
- Kenneth Bradley Russell, American software developer, in 2015, of Java OpenGL

== See also ==
- Kenneth Russell Mallen (1884–1930), Canadian ice hockey player
- Kenneth Russell Hayward, British pilot (see 1954 Birthday Honours)
- Kenneth Russell Unger (1898–1979), American rear admiral and World War I flying ace
- Kenneth Cork (Kenneth Russell Cork, 1913–1991), Lord Mayor of London during 1978–79
