= Edward Russell (cricketer) =

English cricketer (1875–1940)

Alfred Edward Russell
Personal information
- Full name: Alfred Edward Russell
- Born: 9 January 1875; Lewisham, Kent, England
- Died: 8 September 1940 (aged 65); Leytonstone, Essex, England
- Batting: Left-handed
- Role: Wicket-keeper

Domestic team information
- Years: Team
- 1898–1910: Essex

Career statistics
Competition	First-class
Matches	130
Runs scored	2,025
Batting average	13.14
100s/50s	1/2
Top score	100
Catches/stumpings	163/44
- Source: Cricinfo, 25 July 2013

Edward Russell (9 January 1875 – 8 September 1940) was an English cricketer. He played for Essex between 1898 and 1910.
