= Stuart Russell =

Stuart Russell may refer to:

- Stuart Russell (footballer) (1906–1978), Australian rules footballer
- Stuart Russell (politician) (1909–1943), British Conservative party politician, MP for Darwen 1935–1943
- Stuart Russell (rugby union) (born 1963), Welsh rugby union player
- Stuart J. Russell (born 1962), computer scientist known for his contributions to artificial intelligence
- J. Stuart Russell (1816–1895), pastor and author of The Parousia
- Nigel MacArthur, aka Stuart Russell, British DJ
