= Theodore Russel =

English portrait painter

Theodore Russel (also spelled Rousseel, Roussel, or Russell; 1614–1689) was an English portrait-painter of Dutch extraction.

== Origins ==
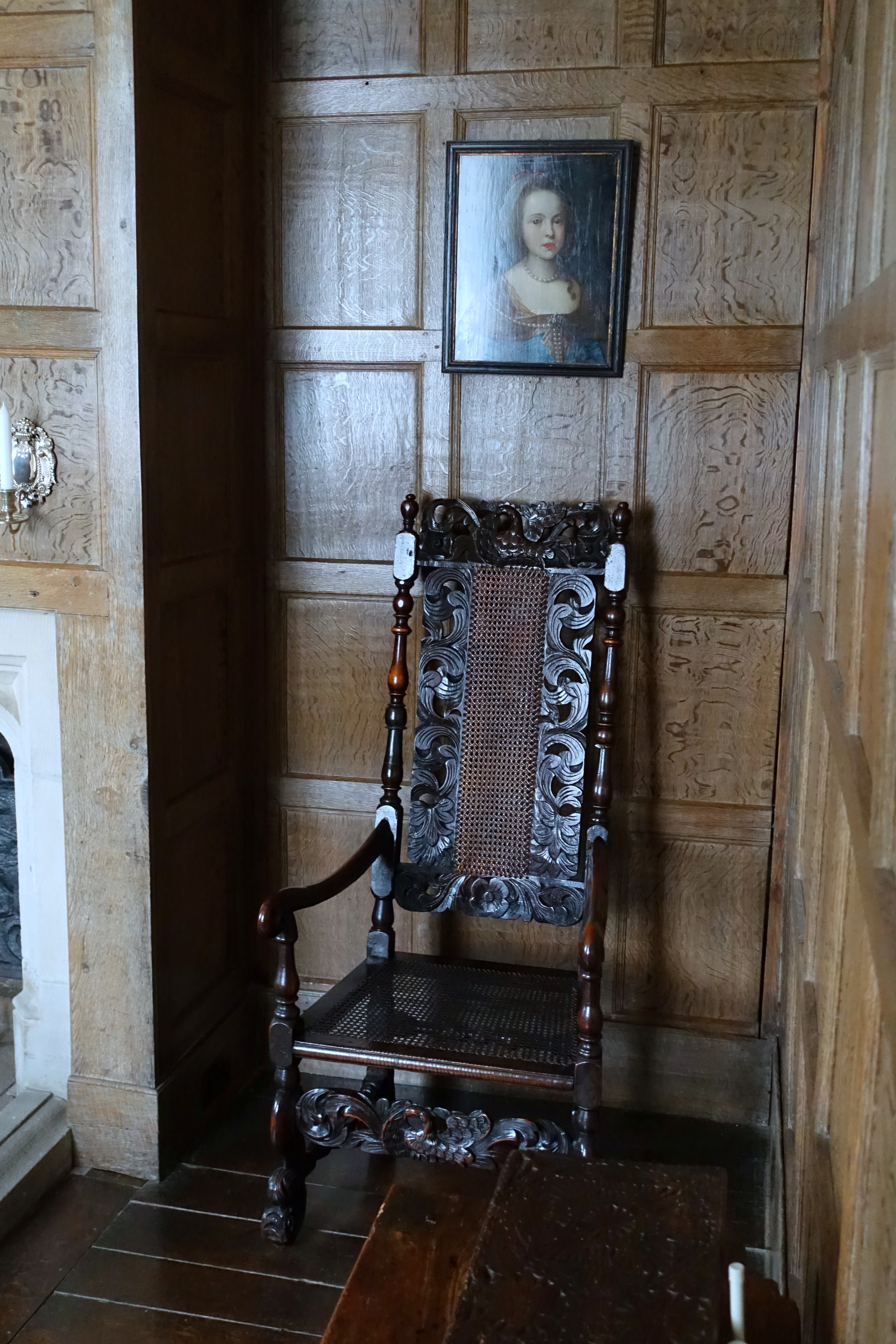
An Unknown Girl, formerly called 'Minette', possibly by Theodore Russel, hanging in Packwood House (c. 1640)

Theodore Russel, born in London, was baptised at the Dutch Church, Austin Friars, on 9 October 1614. He was the son of Nicasius Rousseel (or Russel), a goldsmith, of Bruges, jeweller to James I and Charles I, who settled in London about 1567, and on 21 April 1590 was married at the Dutch Church, Austin Friars, to his first wife, Jacomina Wils of Meessene; by her he had a family, including a son John, who is probably identical with a Jan Rossel or Russel resident at Mortlake from 1629 to 1645, and probably connected with the tapestry works there. Nicasius married as his second wife, at the Dutch Church, on 27 November 1604, Clara Jansz, daughter of Cornelis and Johanna Jansz, and sister of Cornelis Jansz (Janssen or Jonson) van Ceulen, the famous portrait-painter; by her also he had a numerous family, to one of whom (Isaac, born in May 1616) the famous miniature-painter, Isaac Oliver, stood godfather, while to another (Nicasius, born in January 1618–19) Cornelis Janssen and Isaac Oliver's widow stood sponsors.

== Career ==
Theodore Russel was brought up under his father, by whom he was admitted into the Dutch Church in 1640, and afterwards by his uncle, Cornelis Janssen, with whom he lived for about nine years; afterwards he lived as assistant and copyist for about a year with Vandyck. He gained some repute as a portrait-painter, and copied many of Vandyck's portraits on a smaller scale. A portrait of Sir John Suckling, copied in this way, is now in the National Portrait Gallery. Several of his copies were in the Royal Collections, and among the nobility by whom he was patronised were the Earls of Essex and Holland.

== Family ==
Russel resided in Blackfriars, married in January 1649, and died in 1689, leaving a family. According to Vertue, he was 'a lover of Ease and his Bottle'.

His son Antony Russel (c. 1663–1743) carried on the tradition of portrait-painting.

== Works ==
- London (National Portrait Gallery): James Stuart, 1st Duke of Richmond, and 4th Duke of Lennox (c. 1640–1649, oil on canvas, attributed).

== Gallery ==
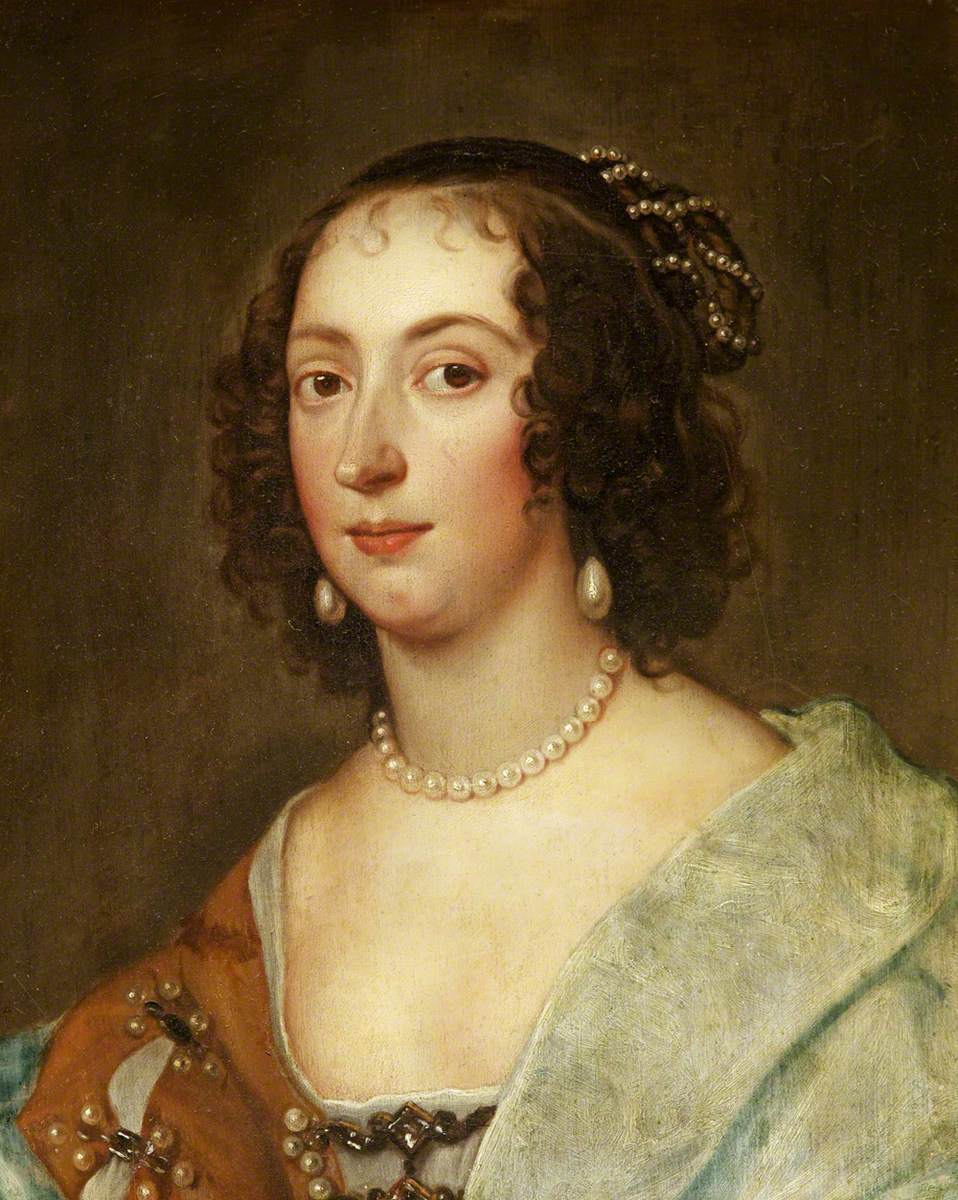
Olivia Boteler Porter (1630s)

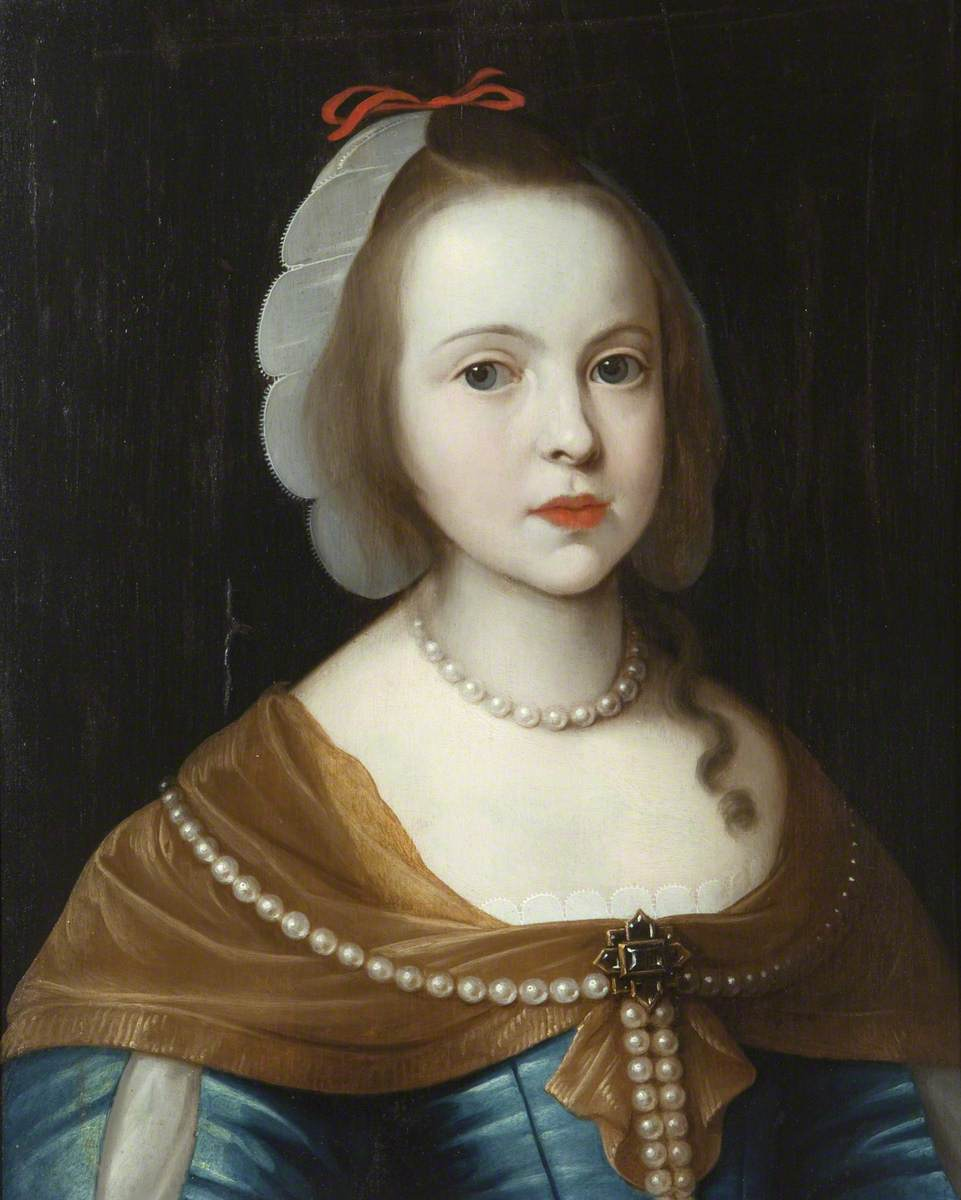
An Unknown Girl, formerly called 'Minette' (c. 1640)

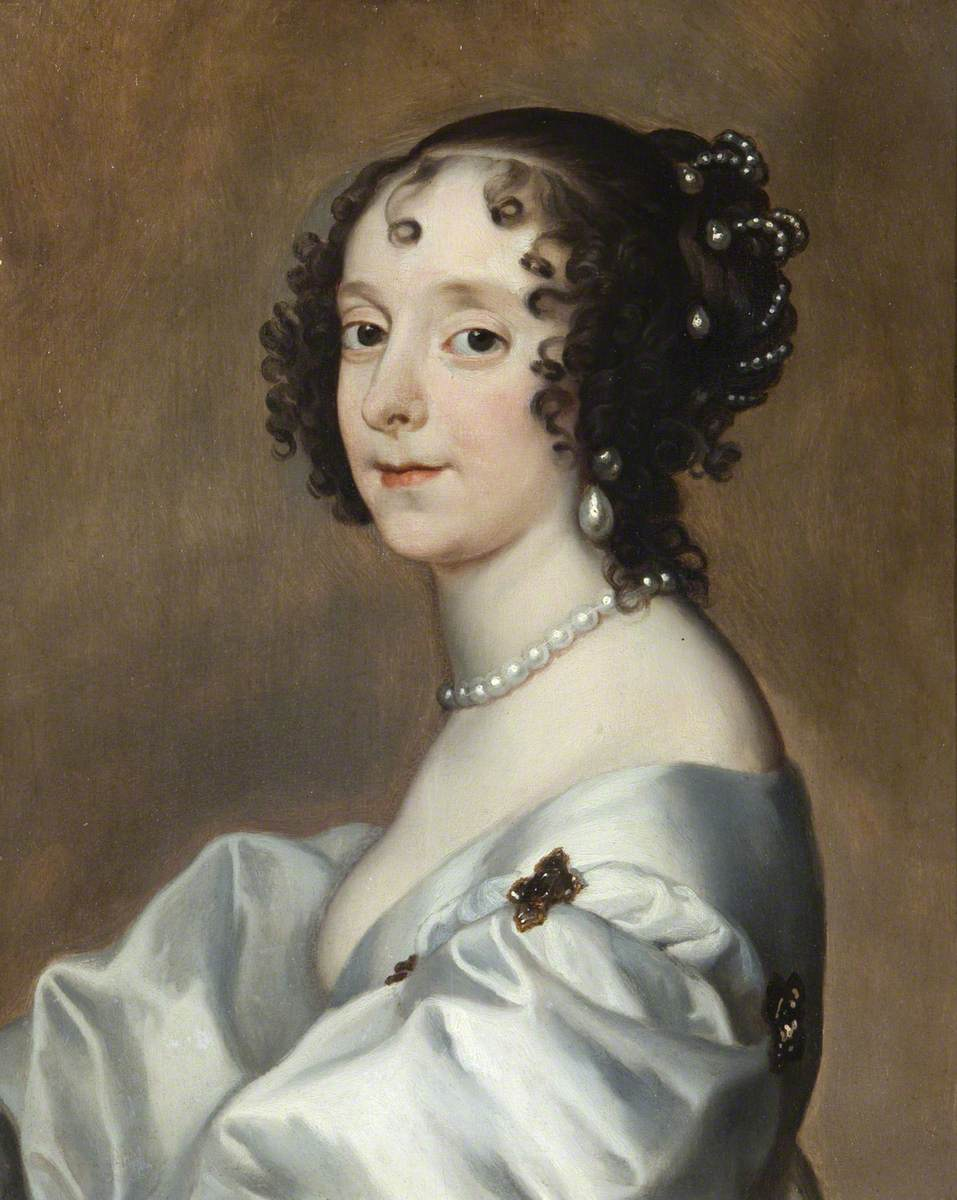
An Unknown Lady, possibly Lady Anne Carey, Countess of Clanbrassil (c. 1640)

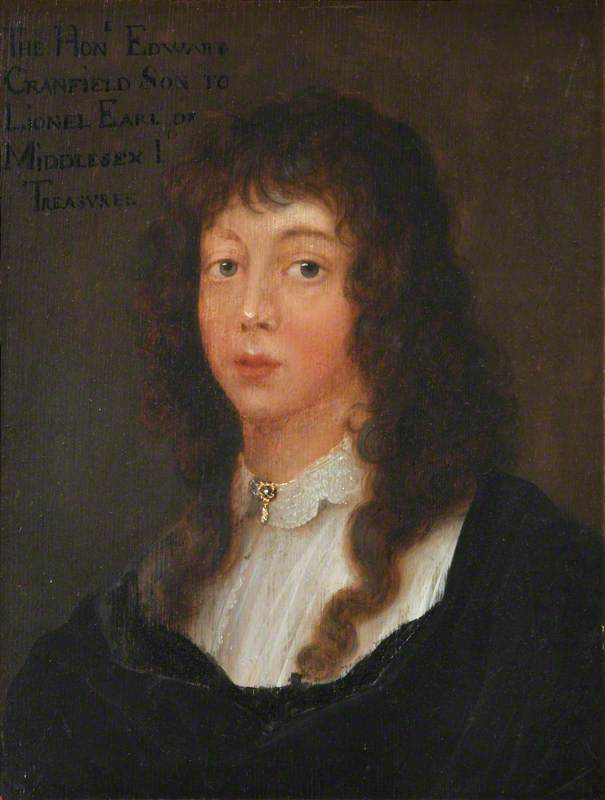
The Hon. Edward Cranfield (died 1642)

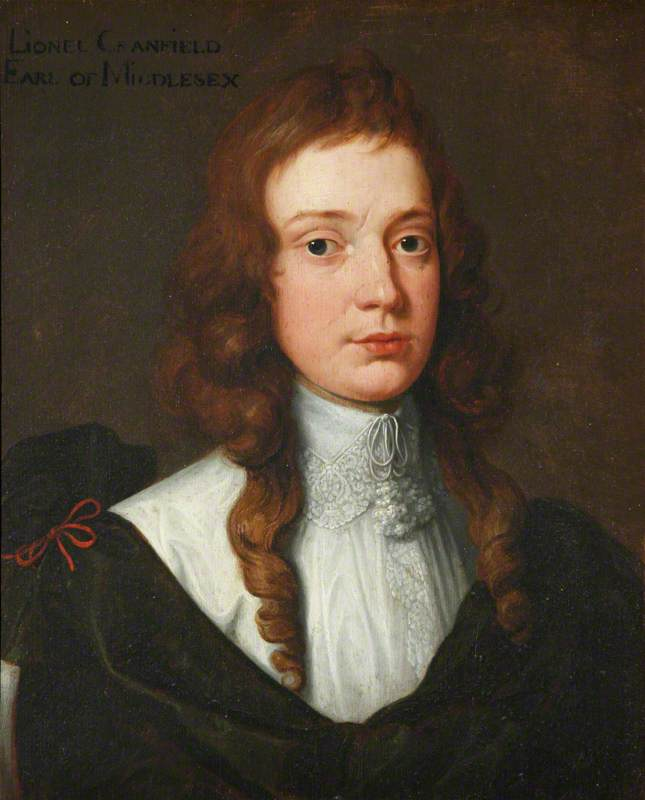
Lionel Cranfield, 3rd Earl of Middlesex (c. 1645)

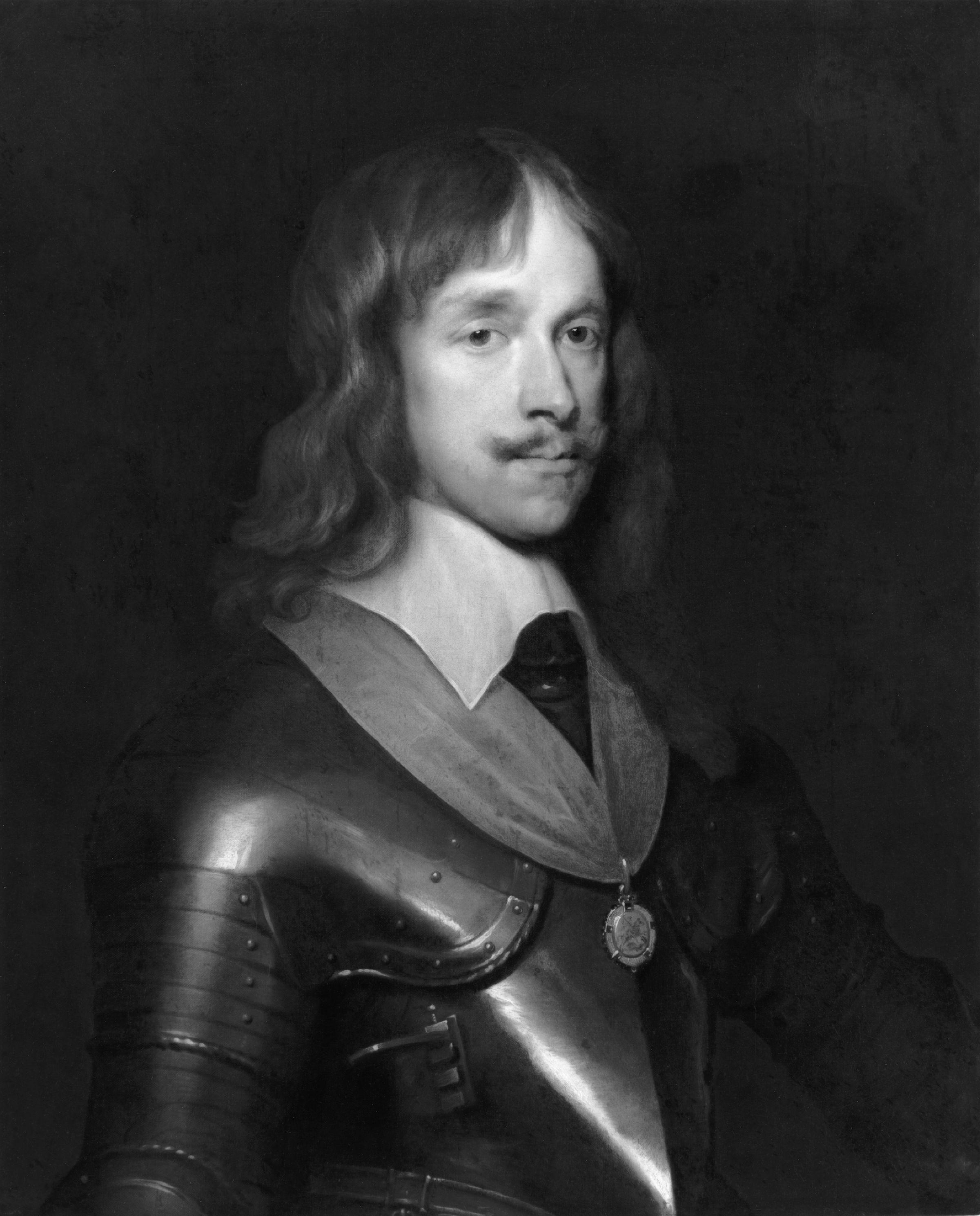
James Stewart, 1st Duke of Richmond (1640s)

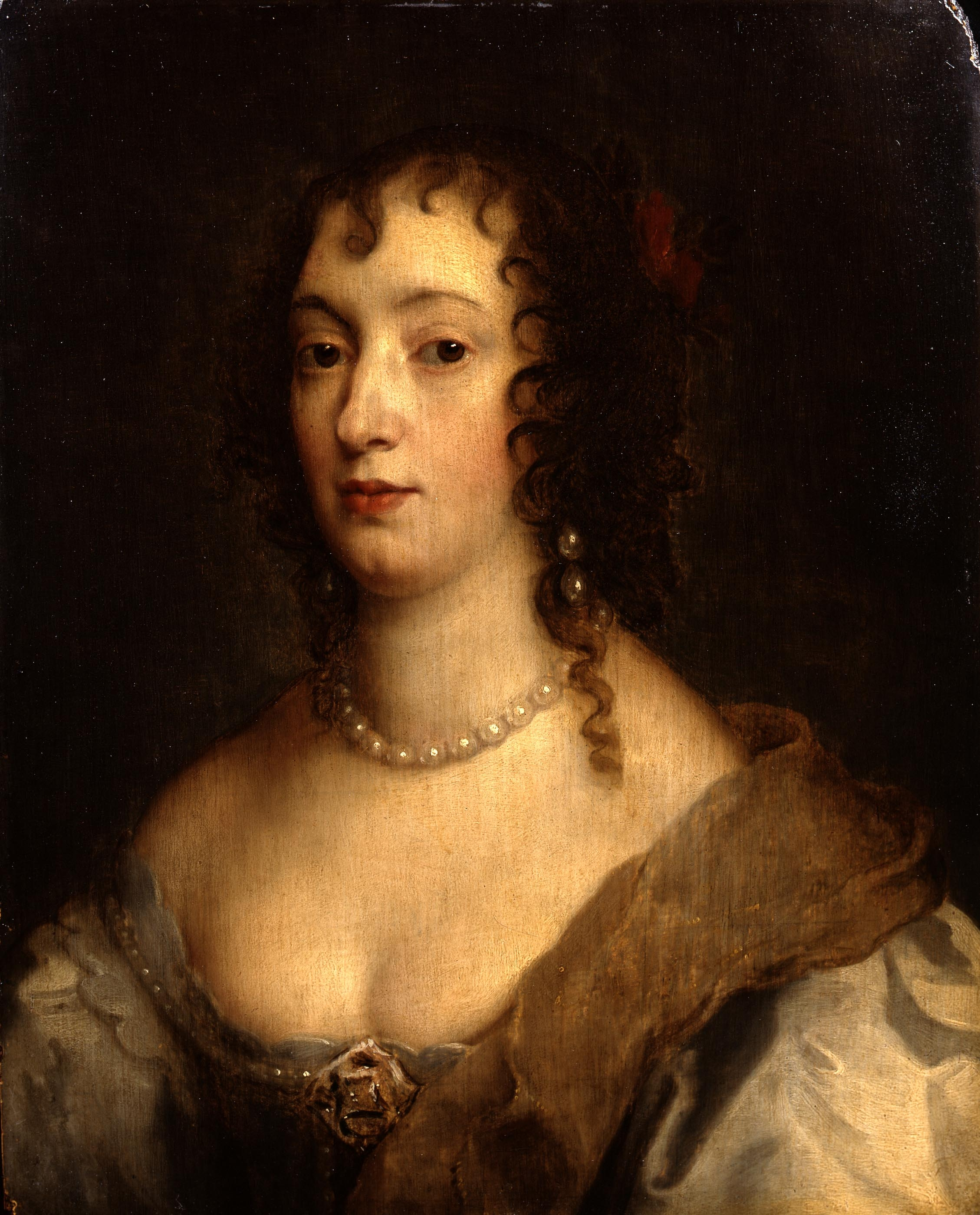
Anne Villiers, Countess of Morton (1640s)

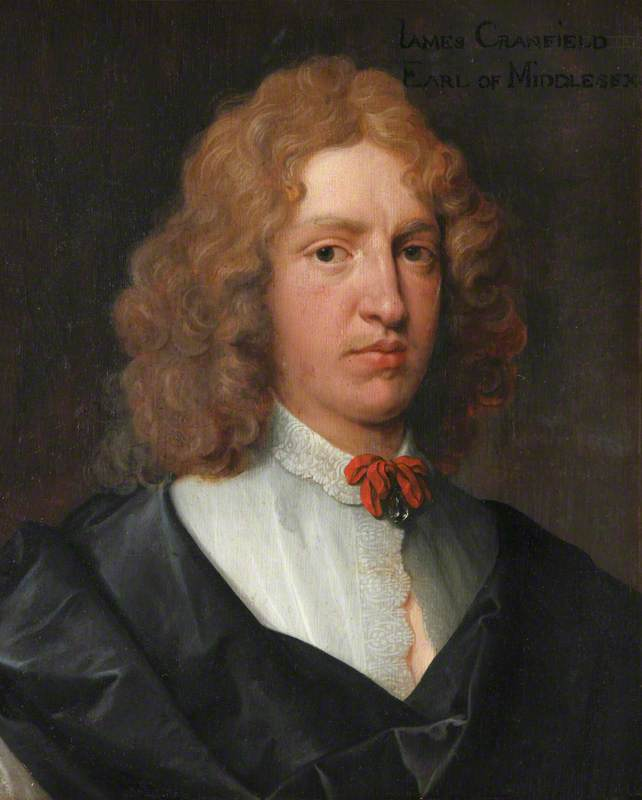
James Cranfield, 2nd Earl of Middlesex (died 1651)

== Sources ==
- Cust, Lionel Henry (1897). "Russel, Theodore" . In Lee, Sidney (ed.). Dictionary of National Biography. Vol. 49. London: Smith, Elder & Co. p. 425.
- Cust, L. H. and Sumner, Ann (2004). "Russell (Roussel, Russel), Theodore (bap. 1614, d. 1689), portrait painter". In Oxford Dictionary of National Biography. Oxford University Press.
- Millar, Oliver (2003). "Russell (Rousel; Rousseel; Russel), Theodore". Grove Art Online. Oxford University Press. Retrieved 20 September 2022.
- Oliver, Valerie Cassel, ed. (2011). "Russel, Theodore". In Benezit Dictionary of Artists. Oxford University Press. Retrieved 20 September 2022.
