= Robert Russell (composer) =

American composer and broadcaster (1933–2020)

Robert Russell (1933 – March 29, 2020) was an American composer, educator, and broadcaster.

== Biography ==
Russell was born in 1933 in Hempstead, New York.

He received bachelor's and master's degrees in composition from the Manhattan School of Music. After graduation, he served on the faculty of the City University of New York. He then became a classical music broadcaster on WNYC, hosting the "world" classical music program Hands Across The Sea upon the retirement of WNYC's original music director Herman Neuman.

In 1977 he joined the staff of Wisconsin Public Radio and remained there until his retirement in 1995. He hosted and produced several classical music programs, including Morning Concert, Tonight At 8, and Sunday Afternoon Live from the Elvehjem.

In 1983 he married Barbara Boehm.

He died on March 29, 2020 in Madison, Wisconsin.

== Legacy ==
His compositions were performed worldwide, including premieres at Carnegie Hall and Lincoln Center. Some of his music was published by Paul Kapp's General Music Publication Company; some published scores and manuscripts have been archived by NYPL's American Music Center. His suite Places for piano 4-hands, which contains extra-musical inspiration and allusions to several New York City locations, has been kept alive in the repertoire by Jean and Kenneth Wentworth, Weekley & Arganbright and Rodewald & Morebello. His Abstract No. 2, has been kept alive in the brass repertoire through Wuff Ridd's arrangement for trumpet ensemble.

== Selected compositions ==
- End of May, a "music drama", excerpts of which were performed at Carnegie Recital Hall on April 13, 1965 by Bradley Alexander and Jennie Kallas.
- So How Does Your Garden Grow? (1965), one-act opera buffa, libretto by Russell. Premiered March 18, 1966 in Carnegie Hall.
- Places, op. 9, suite for piano 4-hands, dedicated to his niece Helen Clark, premiered Feb 24th at Carnegie Recital Hall by Jean and Kenneth Wentworth
- Abstract No. 1, op. 14 for two clarinets and dancer
- Metamorphoses, op. 19 for clarinet alone
- Sonatinas, op. 23 for trumpet and piano
- Sonata in one movement for trombone (or horn) and piano, op. 24 (1967)
- Pan, op. 26 for flute and piano
- Scherzo, for clarinet and piano
- Abstract No. 2 for two trumpets or horns. Arranged for trumpet ensemble by Wuff Ridd.
- Duo for flute and piano
- Brass quintet
- Woodwind Quintet op. 32
- A Spring Sampler
- Symphony for Six: A Percussion Sextet (1971) premiered at Carnegie Hall as part of WNYC's 33rd Annual American Music Festival.
- Dover Beach, song for voice and piano
- Manhattan from my window, song for voice and piano
