= Rab Russell =

Scottish footballer

Personal information
- Date of birth: 31 December 1953 (age 72)
- Place of birth: Cowdenbeath, Scotland
- Position: Central defender

Youth career
- Townhill

Senior career*
Years	Team	Apps	(Gls)
–1973	Lochgelly Albert		
1973–1976	Cowdenbeath		
1979–1983	Cowdenbeath		
- * Club domestic league appearances and goals

Rab Russell (born 31 December 1953) is a Scottish retired semi-professional footballer who made over 200 appearances as a central defender in the Scottish League for Cowdenbeath.

== Personal life ==
Russell attended Beath High School.

== Honours ==
- Cowdenbeath Hall of Fame
