= Frank Russell (bassist) =

American jazz musician

Frank Russell is an American jazz bassist.

== Early life and education ==
Russell was born in Chicago, Illinois. As a teenager he played the drums, guitar and saxophone, before changing to the bass guitar at age 14.

== Career ==
As well as participating in local Chicago projects, Russell has performed before international audiences, and with The Spaniels, Dee Clark, Dee Dee Warwick, Ladysmith Black Mambazo, Corey Wilkes, Freddie Hubbard, Ari Brown and Ramsey Lewis. He has also appeared alongside or recorded with Robert Irving III, Art Porter, Alphonse Mouzon, Red Holt, Mike Wolff, Willie Pickens, Peter Erskine, Ken Chaney and Sugar Blue.

Russell has authored and arranged songs for several of his music industry colleagues, and has collaborated on five recordings with guitarist Henry Johnson. He produced his debut solo album Covering All Basses, in 2005, and the follow-up, Circle without End, in 2011. The 16-track Circle Without End album project features Miles Davis ensemble alumnus Irving III, Darryl Jones of The Rolling Stones, Wallace Roney, Richard Patterson and Brazilian percussionist Dedé Sampaio. The release has met with praise, and has garnered radio airplay domestically, and internationally.

Russell plays both acoustic and electric bass. Russell hosts bass workshops and clinics at venues across the country.

In 2013, Russell is leading his own band, the Frank Russell Band. The band performed at the 2013 Chicago Jazz Festival.
