= Samuel Russell (disambiguation) =

Samuel Russell (1789–1862) was an American entrepreneur and trader.

Samuel Russell may also refer to:

- Samuel L. Russell (1816–1891), American congressman
- Samuel Russell (Yale co-founder) (1660–1731), co-founder of Yale University
- Samuel Russell (Canadian politician) (1848–1924), Presbyterian missionary, newspaper editor and politician in Canada
- Samuel Bridgman Russell (1864–1955), Scottish architect
- Samuel Thomas Russell (1766–1845), English actor

== See also ==
- Sam Russell (disambiguation)
