= Thomas Russell (archdeacon of Cork) =

Irish Anglican cleric

Thomas Russell (1693-1745) was Archdeacon of Cork from 1725 until his death.

Russell was born in Lisburn and educated at Trinity College, Dublin. He held livings at Killanully, Kilbrittain, Cannaway and Ardnageehy. He was Precentor of Cork from 1720 to 1725; and of Ross from 1724.
