= Andrea Russell =

American chemist

- Education: University of Michigan; University of Utah
- Scientific career
- Workplaces: Newcastle University; University of Liverpool; United States Naval Research Laboratory; University of Southampton
- Thesis: Infrared spectroscopic studies of electrode surfaces and electrochemical reactions (1990)

Andrea Russell FRSC FHEA is an American chemist who is a professor at the University of Southampton. She is vice president of the International Society of Electrochemistry. Her research considers the use of spectroscopy to better understand the interface between electrodes and electrolytes.

== Early life and education ==
Russell was an undergraduate student at the University of Michigan. She moved to the University of Utah for graduate studies, where she used infrared spectroscopy to examine electrode surfaces. After completing her doctorate, Russell was appointed as a research fellow at the United States Naval Research Laboratory 1990-1991.

== Research and career ==
In 1991, Russell moved to the United Kingdom, where she was appointed to the University of Liverpool. She spent three years in Liverpool before joining Newcastle University. In 1997 Russell moved to the University of Southampton. She was promoted to professor in 2007.

Russell's research considers the use of spectroscopy to better understand the interface between electrodes and electrolytes. She is particularly interested in gas sensors, metal-air batteries and fuel cells. She makes use of several international facilities, including the Diamond Light Source, ISIS Neutron and Muon Source and the Advanced Light Source. In particular, Russell has developed X-ray absorption spectroscopy for in situ studies of electrocatalysts.

In 2002, Russell chaired the Gordon Research Conference on Fuel Cells. Russell serves on the Engineering and Physical Sciences Research Council (EPSRC) College and the Diamond Light Source Strategic Advisory Committee. A keen user of the Diamond Light Source, Russell serves as Spectroscopy representative for the Diamond User Committee. In 2021 she was elected vice president of the International Society of Electrochemistry.

Russell is involved with undergraduate and postgraduate teaching at the University of Southampton. She contributes to the Southampton Electrochemistry Summer Schools, which are attended by hundreds of delegates around the world. She was awarded the Faculty of Engineering and Physical Sciences Award for Best Pastoral Support in 2020.

== Selected publications ==
- Richard C Thompson; Ylva Olsen; Richard P Mitchell; Anthony Davis; Steven J Rowland; Anthony W G John; Daniel McGonigle; Andrea E Russell (7 May 2004). "Lost at sea: where is all the plastic?". Science. 304 (5672): 838. doi:10.1126/science.1094559. ISSN 0036-8075. PMID 15131299. Wikidata Q28260621.
- Andrea E Russell; Abigail Rose (1 October 2004). "X-ray absorption spectroscopy of low temperature fuel cell catalysts". Chemical Reviews. 104 (10): 4613–4635. doi:10.1021/cr020708r. ISSN 0009-2665. PMID 15669164. Wikidata Q81315325.
- McKeown, David A.; Hagans, Patrick L.; Carette, Linda P. L.; Russell, Andrea E.; Swider, Karen E.; Rolison, Debra R. (1999-06-01). "Structure of Hydrous Ruthenium Oxides: Implications for Charge Storage". The Journal of Physical Chemistry B. 103 (23): 4825–4832. Bibcode:1999JPCB..103.4825M. doi:10.1021/jp990096n. ISSN 1520-6106.
