= Alfred Russell =

Alfred Russell may refer to:

- Alfred Russell (boxer) (1915–1966), British boxer
- Alfred Russell (artist) (1920–2007), American artist
- Alfred Francis Russell (1817–1884), president of Liberia
