= Kate Russell =

Kate Russell may refer to:

- Kate Russell (reporter) (born 1968), English technology reporter
- Kate Elizabeth Russell, American author
- Katharine Russell, Viscountess Amberley (1844–1874), known as Kate, British suffragist and mother of Bertrand Russell
- Lady Katharine Tait (1923–2021), née Russell, essayist and daughter of Bertrand Russell

== See also ==
- Katherine Russell (disambiguation)
- Victoria Kate Russell, British portrait painter
