= Adam H. Russell =

American anthropologist and rugby union player

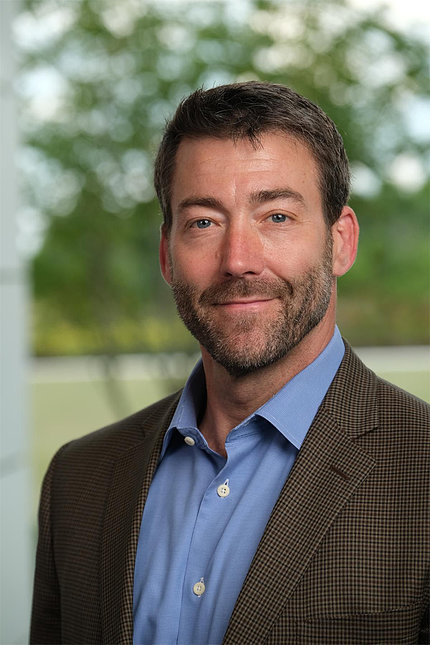
- Russell in 2022
- Education: Duke University; University of Oxford
- Scientific career
- Fields: Applied anthropology, program management
- Workplaces: Intelligence Advanced Research Projects Activity; DARPA; University of Maryland; Advanced Research Projects Agency for Health; University of Southern California Information Sciences Institute; NIST/US AI Safety Institute

Adam H. Russell is an American anthropologist who serves as Chief Vision Officer of the U.S. AI Safety Institute. He previously served as the acting deputy director of the Advanced Research Projects Agency for Health.

== Life ==
Russell completed a Bachelor of Arts in Cultural Anthropology from Duke University, and an M.Phil. and a D.Phil. in Social Anthropology from University of Oxford, where he was a Rhodes Scholar. He played with the Oxford University RFC for four varsity matches and represented the United States on the US Men's National Team, becoming Eagle #368. He also worked with the United States national rugby union team, and worked as high performance director for the United States women's national rugby union team in the 2014 and 2017 Women's Rugby World Cups.

Russell began in industry, where he was a senior scientist and principal investigator on a wide range of human performance and social science research projects and provided strategic assessments for a number of different government organizations. In 2009, Russell joined the Intelligence Advanced Research Projects Activity (IARPA) as a program manager. He developed and managed a number of high-risk, high-payoff research projects for the Office of the Director of National Intelligence. Russell joined DARPA as a program manager in July 2015. His work there focused on advancing capabilities for understanding and tackling problems in the Human Domain, including the creation of new experimental platforms and tools to facilitate discovery, quantification and "big validation" of fundamental measures, research, and tools in social science, behavioral science and human performance. His term at DARPA ended in 2020, when he left to become the Chief Scientist for the Applied Research Laboratory for Intelligence and Security at the University of Maryland.

In 2022, while still at ARLIS, HHS Secretary Xavier Becerra selected Russell to serve as the acting deputy director for the Advanced Research Projects Agency for Health (ARPA-H). In that role, Russell helped lead the process to stand up ARPA-H before the inaugural director was selected and on-boarded.

In 2023, Russell became the Director of USC's Information Sciences Institute’s Artificial Intelligence Division, where he currently works. He also hosts USC ISI's "AI/nsiders podcast" - which he launched on the premise that better understanding AI might also mean better understanding the humans working with, on, and around it.

As of April 2024, he is also serving in an IPA capacity as the Chief Vision Officer for NIST's AI Safety Institute, where he is supporting the stand up of the USAISI and its organizational vision, mission, strategy, and design in order to - in his words - help ensure that AI Safety leads to "the best of all possible worlds."
