= Gordon Russell =

Gordon Russell may refer to:

- Gordon Russell (writer) (1929–1981), American scriptwriter
- Gordon J. Russell (1859–1919), U.S. Representative from Texas and federal judge
- Gordon Russell (footballer), Scottish former footballer and manager
- Sir Gordon Russell (designer) (1892–1980), English designer
