= Xevi Pujolar =

Spanish engineer

- Born: Francisco Javier Pujolar i Pla; 3 January 1973 (age 53); Madremanya, Girona, Spain
- Citizenship: Spanish
- Occupation: Engineer
- Years active: 2002–2024
- Known for: Formula One engineer

Francisco Javier "Xevi" Pujolar i Pla (born 3 January 1973) is a Spanish Formula One engineer who formerly served as the Head of Trackside Engineering and Racing Director of Stake F1 Team Kick Sauber, he departed from Sauber prior to the start of the 2025 season.

== Career ==
Pujolar studied mechanical engineering at the University of Girona for three years and while he was there he got a job in Genikart, who had a young Fernando Alonso as one of its drivers. After graduating in 1996, he worked kart in France with Cristian Boudon for a year. He then went to work at Formula Nissan for the G-Tech team as a race engineer. Pujolar remained there until 2000, when he moved to F3000 to the Red Bull junior team where he met Niki Lauda who invited him to work for Jaguar Racing in Formula 1 to be one of the performance engineers responsible for Eddie Irvine's car.

In 2003, transferred to Williams to be Juan Pablo Montoya's performance engineer and in 2004, he was promoted to be the race engineer of Ralf Schumacher, a position in which he worked with several Williams drivers including Mark Webber, Alex Wurz and Kazuki Nakajima. In 2010, Pujolar seeking a new challenge moved to fledging contractor Hispania to become a senior race engineer for Bruno Senna, but left the struggling team after a year. He then returned to Williams to be Pastor Maldonado's racing engineer, a partnership that continued into 2012 where Maldonado took victory in the Spanish Grand Prix. Pujolar was promoted to chief race engineer in 2013 overseeing the entire trackside engineering team for Williams. In 2014, he joined Toro Rosso, retaining the role of senior race engineer, and worked with Jean-Eric Vergne and later with Max Verstappen.

In May 2016, Pujolar left Toro Rosso and in September of the same year, he commenced work for Sauber as head of track engineering, where he remains as the team transitioned into Alfa Romeo Racing. From October 2023, Pujolar was promoted to Racing Director, as the team transitions to Audi F1 Team from 2026 onwards while competing as Stake F1 Team Kick Sauber for the 2024 and 2025 seasons. On a The Race episode regarding the Audi F1 Team, it was revealed Pujolar departed from Sauber prior to the start of the 2025 season.
