= Rousselle =

Rousselle is a French surname. Notable people with the surname include:

- Benny Rousselle (born 1951), American realtor and politician
- Duane Rousselle (born 1982), Canadian psychoanalyst and sociologist
- Jean Rousselle (born 1953), Canadian politician
- Maurice Rousselle (1895–1926), French World War I flying ace
