= Ted Russell (musician) =

American conductor

Theodore "Ted" Caskey Russell was an American conductor and violinist who helped form Mississippi's first symphony orchestra the original Jackson Symphony Orchestra (JSO) during the 1940s. Russell conducted 50 Jackson musicians in their premier concert on Thursday, October, 19, 1944, in the Victory Room of the Heidelberg Hotel. His education included a B.S. degree from Missouri Teacher's College, a M.M. from Northwestern University, and training with Georges Enesco in Paris, and Joseph Szigetti in Switzerland.
