= Allenby =

Allenby is a surname of English origin. Notable people with the surname include:

- Edmund Allenby, 1st Viscount Allenby (1861–1936), British Army field-marshal
  - Named after Edmund Allenby:
    - Viscount Allenby, a title in the Peerage of the United Kingdom
    - Allenby Street, Tel Aviv, Israel
    - Allenby Bridge between Jordan and West Bank.
    - Allenby Square, name given in succession to two squares in Jerusalem
    - Allenby Camp, site of a former British Army camp in Jerusalem
    - Allenby Garden in Beersheba
    - Allenby Gardens, South Australia
    - Foch-Allenby, neighborhood in Beirut Central District
    - Allenby, British Columbia, Canada
    - Allenby Junior public school, Toronto, Ontario, Canada
  - Relatives of Edmund Allenby
    - Dudley Allenby, 2nd Viscount Allenby (1903–1984), British soldier, nephew of Edmund Allenby
    - Michael Allenby, 3rd Viscount Allenby (1931–2014), British soldier, son of Dudley Allenby
- Braden Allenby (born 1950), American environmental scientist
- Cecil Allenby (1873–1932), English cricketer
- Jim Allenby (born 1982), Australian cricketer
- Kate Allenby (born 1974), British modern pentathlete
- Nicholas Allenby (1909–1995), English Anglican bishop in Malaysia
- Peggy Allenby (1901–1966), American silent film, television and radio actress
- Robert Allenby (born 1971), Australian golfer
- Allenby Chilton (1918–1996), English footballer
- Allenby Beardsley, fictional character in Japanese anime television series Mobile Fighter G Gundam

A common variant is "Allanby":

- Nick Allanby (born 1957), Australian cricketer
- Richard Allanby (born 1971), Australian cricketer
