= Romema =

Neighborhood in Jerusalem, Israel

Coordinates: 31.790°N 35.204°E

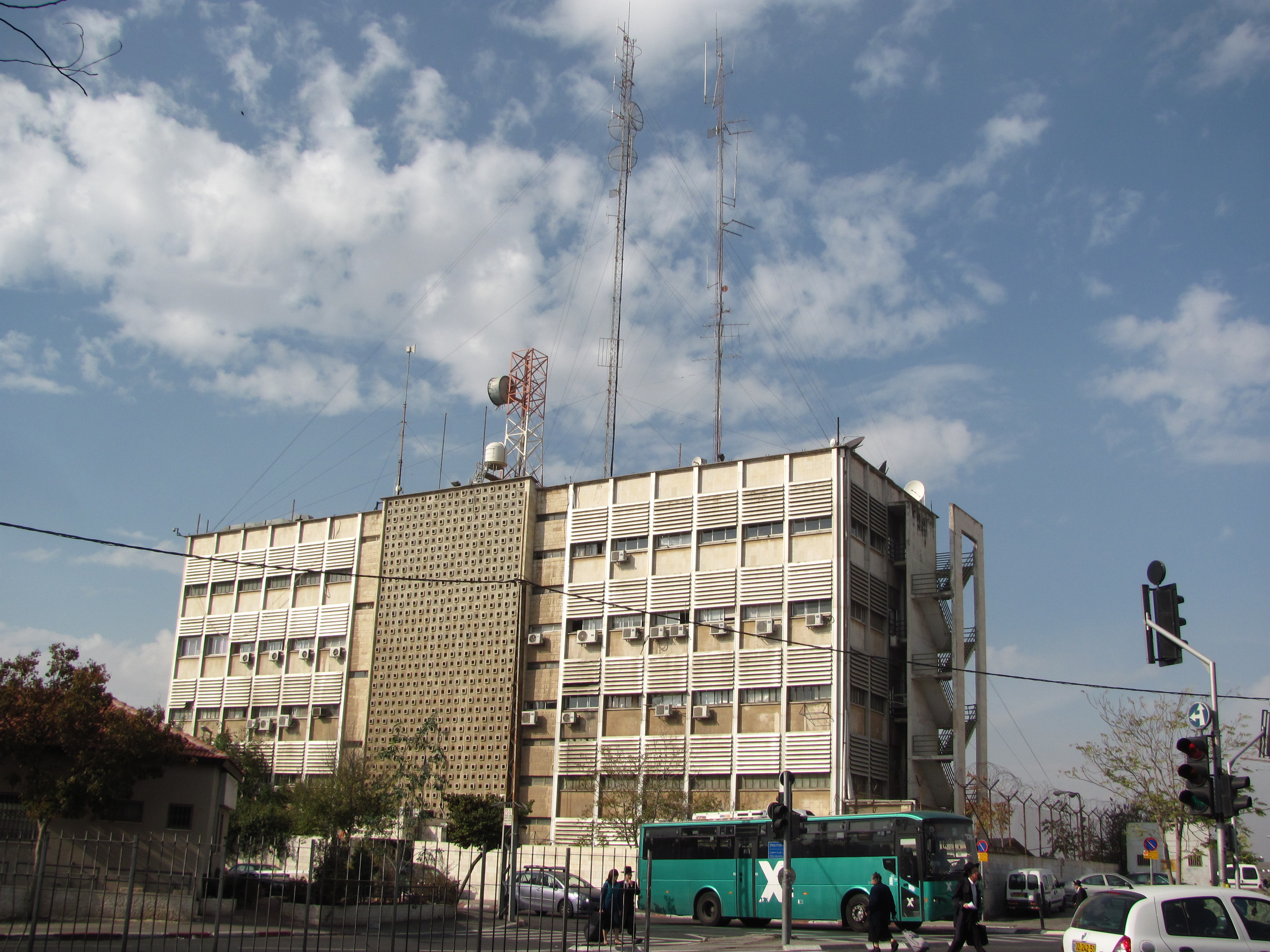
Former Israel Broadcasting Authority head office in Romema, pictured in 2012.

Romema (Hebrew: רוממה, lit. Uplifted) is a neighbourhood in northwest Jerusalem, just off the Tel Aviv-Jerusalem highway at the main entrance to the city. It occupies the highest hill in Jerusalem. Romema is bordered by Kiryat Mattersdorf and Mekor Baruch.

Romema serves as Jerusalem's transportation hub. It is home to the Jerusalem Central Bus Station, the Chords Bridge, and the Yitzhak Navon train station.

== Name ==
The name of the neighborhood is based on Psalms 118:16: "The Lord's right hand is lifted high (romem)".

== History ==
=== British Mandate ===
Romema was founded on a hill outside the village of Lifta in 1921. The initiator of the project was attorney Yom-Tov Hamon, an expert in Ottoman law and land-ownership issues, who arbitrated disputes among Arab landowners in the region and opened sales of the land to Jews. The original building plan called for 24 houses surrounding a central square. The Jewish section of the neighborhood was built with private funding. Most of the original streets were named for Hebrew newspapers of the era: HaZvi, edited by Eliezer Ben-Yehuda, Ariel, HaOr, Torah Mitzion, and Moriah. In 1931 a water reservoir was erected here.

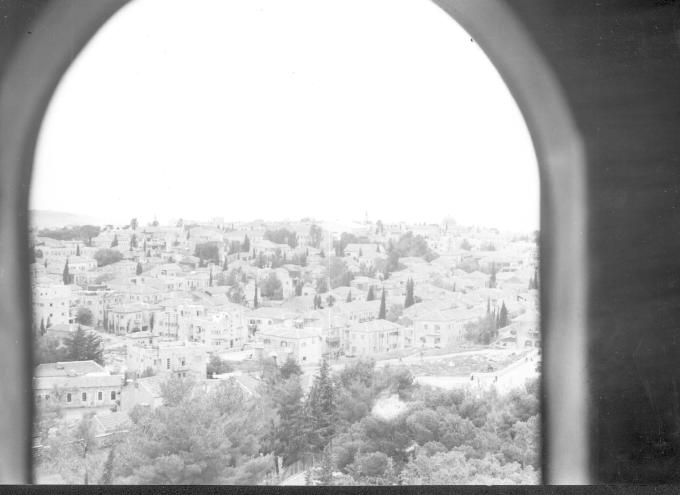
Romama from Schneller Orphanage, 1948

Extant architecture shows the area's original affluence, wealth, and diversity. These include the three-story residence of Arab Haj Muhammad, who owned quarries in nearby Lifta and was a judge in the city's Muslim courts; the elegant home of Jewish hotelier and businessman Yehiel Amdurski, and the home of Rabbi Yehuda Fishman-Maimon.

=== 1948 war ===
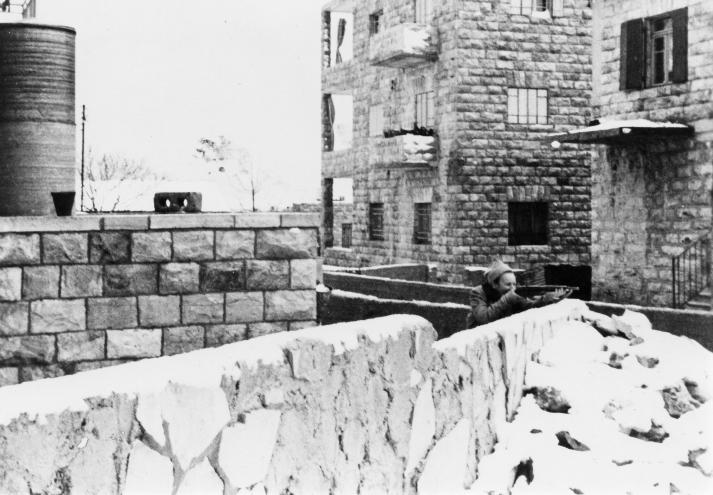
Member of Harel Brigade 10th Battalion in Romema after snow fall, 1948.

By 1948, the population was diverse, with Arab, Ashkenazi and Sephardi Jewish residents. At the beginning of 1948, during the Civil war, Christian Palestinians and Muslim Arabs living in the Arab section of Romema as well as the nearby village of Lifta were forced out of their homes due to violence from Jewish paramilitary groups such as the Irgun, as well as clashes with Arab militia men. Due to the Absentee Property Law, Arab residents were not allowed to return to their homes by the Israeli government, a point of contention for Palestinians who held property there.

=== State of Israel ===
After the establishment of the State of Israel, Romema became a center of light industry for many decades, home to a large number of garages, foundries, carpentry workshops and factories.

From 1950 to 1991, Romema was the home of the Jerusalem Biblical Zoo, after access to the zoo on Mount Scopus was blocked in 1949.

In 2007, as businesses closed and properties were bought up by developers, a master plan was commissioned for the neighborhood. Today Romema is Jerusalem's transportation hub: The Jerusalem Central Bus Station and Chords Bridge are located there, and a high-speed railway terminus has been built opposite the bus station.

== Landmarks ==
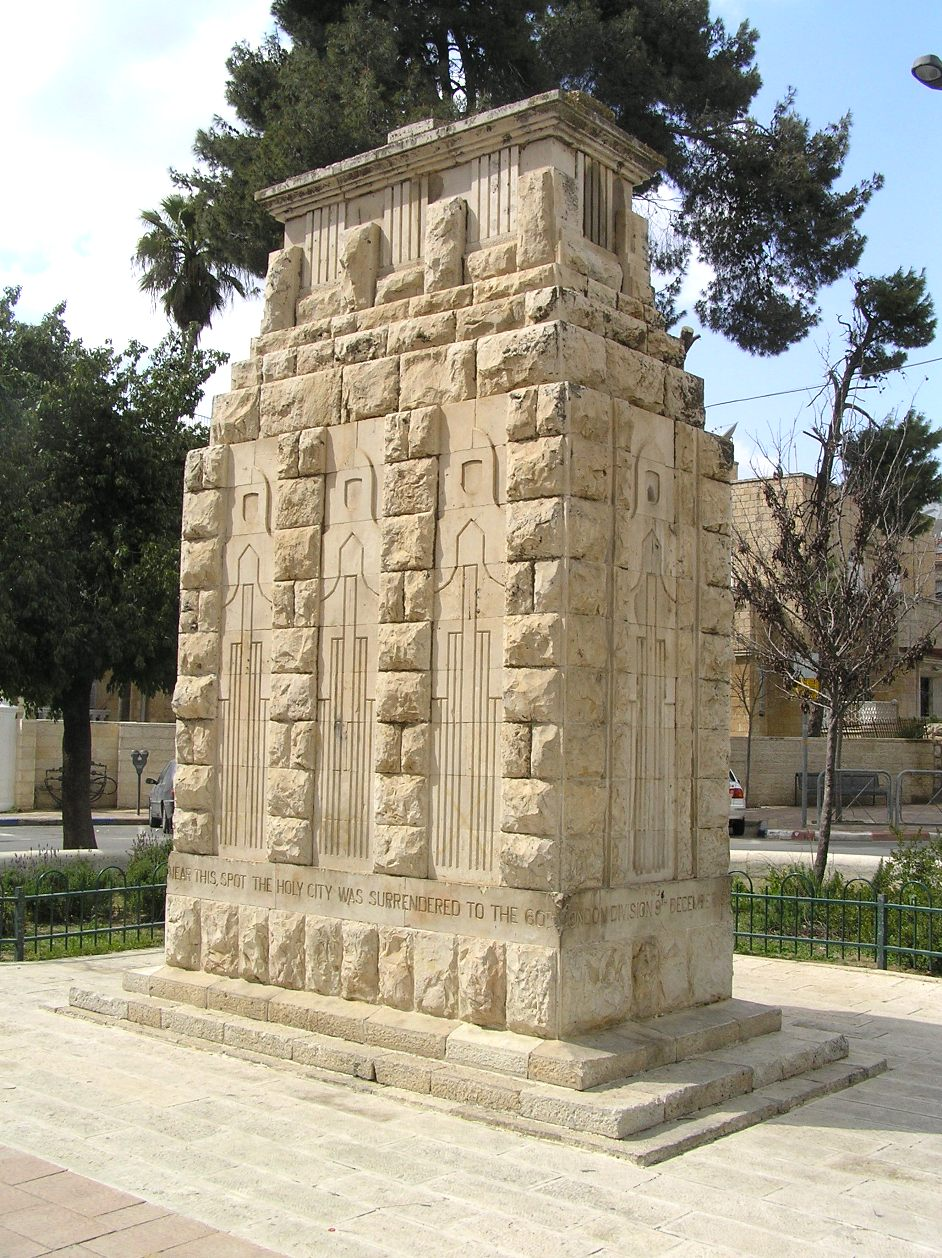
Monument to British soldiers, Allenby Square

A 3-meter high monument commemorating the British soldiers who fell in the battle for Palestine stands at Allenby Square at the top of Romema Street, where the Turkish Army surrendered to General Allenby during World War I. It was erected by soldiers of the 60th London Division in 1920. The inscription around the base reads: "Near this spot, the Holy City was surrendered to the 60th London Division, 9th December 1917." Etched into the monument are the silhouettes of Crusader knights, drawing a symbolic link between them and the British soldiers who conquered Jerusalem. The British also built a water tower in Romema, which was the highest point in Jerusalem at the time. Water from an adjacent pool was piped all over the city.

The Jerusalem branch of the Magen David Adom ambulance service is located in Romema.

Other landmarks include the Israel Television building, Jerusalem Gate Hotel, Center One shopping mall, Belz Great Synagogue and Rabbinical College with a design resembling that of the Second Temple, and the Aleh Center for the rehabilitation of handicapped children and youth.

Former landmarks included offices of The Jerusalem Post and Haaretz, the Tnuva dairy factory, Amcor refrigerator factory, and Achuza wedding hall. These have been mostly demolished making room for construction of high-rise residential buildings.

== Architecture ==
Many of the factory buildings in Romema were designed by Rudolf ("Rudy") Reuven Trostler, a pioneer of industrial architecture in Israel. Trostler also designed the five-story building housing the Israel Broadcasting Authority, which was erected in the 1960s as a diamond polishing center. The building was in the International Style with a gray breeze-block grille on the facade that became one of Trostler's stylistic trademarks. When the diamond industry in Jerusalem did not take off as anticipated, the building was renovated for television broadcasting.

== See also ==
- List of villages depopulated during the Arab–Israeli conflict
