= Simon Russell, 3rd Baron Russell of Liverpool =

British peer (born 1952)

The Right Honourable The Lord Russell of Liverpool
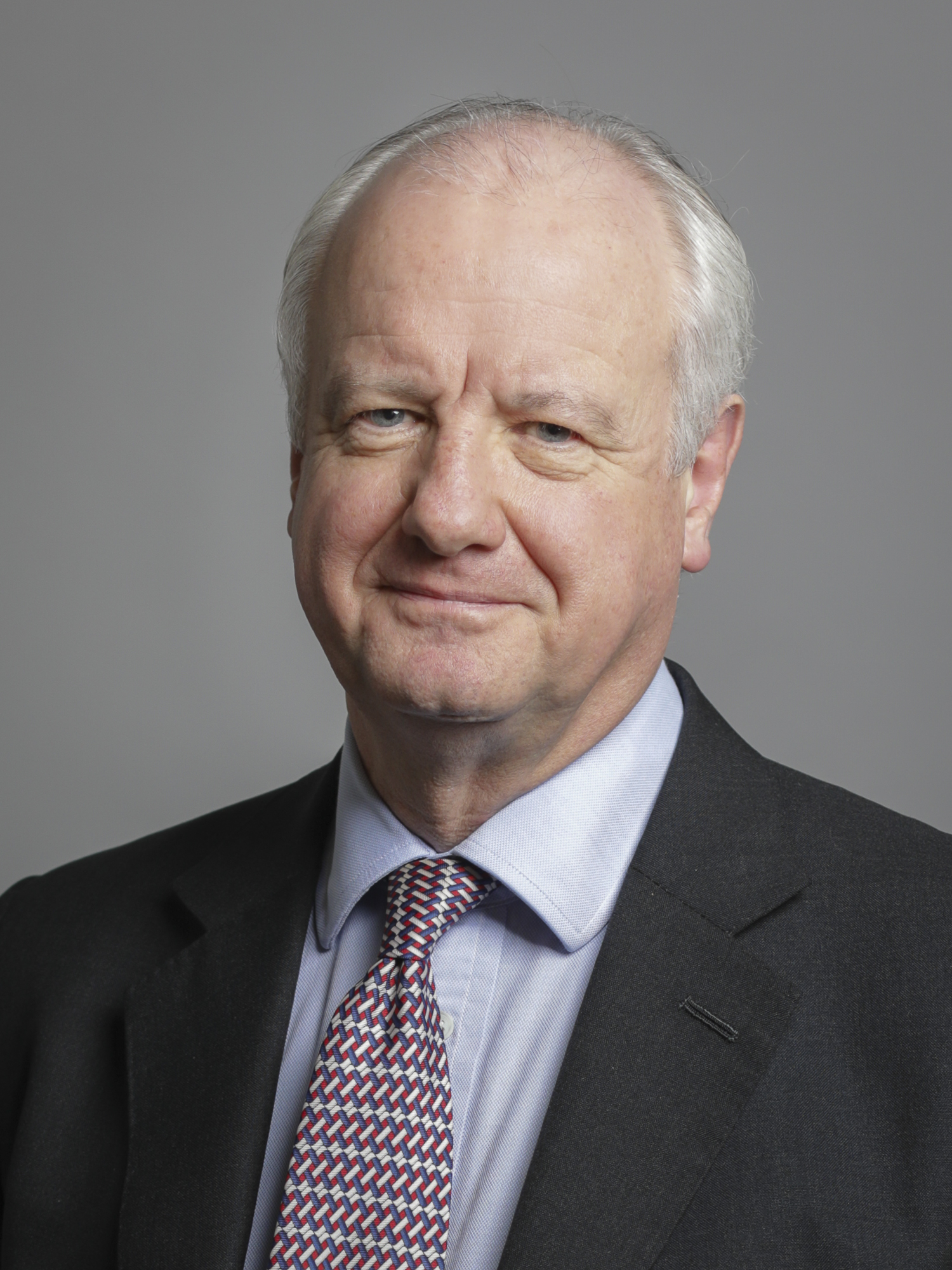
- Official portrait, 2019

Member of the House of Lords Lord Temporal
- Incumbent
- Life peerage 8 June 2026
- Elected Hereditary Peer; 11 December 2014 – 29 April 2026
- By-election: 2014
- Preceded by: The 3rd Viscount Allenby
- Succeeded by: Seat abolished
- Hereditary peerage 27 April 1982 – 11 November 1999
- Preceded by: 2nd Baron Russell of Liverpool
- Succeeded by: Seat abolished

Personal details
- Born: Simon Gordon Jared Russell; 30 August 1952 (age 74)
- Party: Crossbench

Simon Gordon Jared Russell, 3rd Baron Russell of Liverpool, Baron Russell of Kiloran (born 30 August 1952), is a British hereditary peer. As a member of the House of Lords, he sits as a crossbencher.

Lord Russell was born on 30 August 1952, the eldest son of Kiloran Margaret Howard (b. 1926) and Captain the Hon. Langley Gordon Haslingden Russell (1922–1975), who predeceased his father the 2nd Baron. In 1981, Russell succeeded to the barony on the death of his paternal grandfather Edward Russell, 2nd Baron Russell of Liverpool. His maternal grandfather was the Conservative MP Sir Arthur Howard. Russell is also the great-grandson of former British Prime Minister Stanley Baldwin. Russell was educated at Charterhouse School, Trinity College, Cambridge, and INSEAD.

Having lost his seat in the House of Lords under the House of Lords Act 1999, he returned as an elected hereditary peer at a by-election in December 2014. Russell was removed again in April 2026 from the House of Lords as part of the House of Lords (Hereditary Peers) Act 2026, but was returned to the House as a life peer when he was created as Baron Russell of Kiloran, of Colonsay in the County of Argyll in the May 2026 political peerages.

Coat of arms of Simon Russell, 3rd Baron Russell of Liverpool
Crest An owl wings expanded Argent beaked and legged Or resting the dexter claw and estoile Azure. Escutcheon Per saltire Sable and Or in chief an estoile Argent two roses in fess Gules barbed and seeded Proper and in base a thistle leaved and slipped of the second. Supporters On either side an owl Argent beaked and legged Or gorged with a chaplet of roses Gules leaved Vert. Motto More Light

Peerage of the United Kingdom
Preceded by Edward Russell	Baron Russell of Liverpool; 1981–present Member of the House of Lords (1982–1999)	Incumbent; Heir apparent: Hon. Edward Russell
Parliament of the United Kingdom
Preceded by The Viscount Allenby	Elected hereditary peer to the House of Lords under the House of Lords Act 1999; 2014–2026	Position abolished under the House of Lords (Hereditary Peers) Act 2026
