= The Scourge of the Swastika =

1954 book by Edward Russell

The Scourge of the Swastika: A Short History of Nazi War Crimes
- Author: Lord Russell of Liverpool
- Language: English
- Subject: Nazi war crimes
- Publisher: Cassell
- Publication date: 19 August 1954
- Publication place: United Kingdom
- Media type: Print (hardback)
- Pages: 259
- OCLC: 570123
- LC Class: D804.G4 R83 1954

The Scourge of the Swastika: A Short History of Nazi War Crimes is a 1954 non-fiction book by Edward Russell, 2nd Baron Russell of Liverpool.

== Synopsis ==
The book provides a brief history of the Nazi war crimes and features graphic photographic evidence.

== Publication ==
The book's publication resulted in great controversy. Russell was ordered by the government to withdraw the book's publication. About a week before its publication, he resigned his position of Assistant Judge Advocate General. The book was published by Cassell on 19 August 1954. The book quickly became an international bestseller, and remained a bestseller for years.

== Reception ==
In his review for the ABA Journal, U.S. Circuit Judge John J. Parker wrote that Russell "rendered a distinct public service in giving us a brief history of these war crimes in a form that the average man can read and understand."

Drew Middleton of The New York Times called it a "difficult" book for readers.

== Legacy and influence ==
The book has been cited as an early influence by novelist Howard Jacobson; The Scourge of the Swastika appears in Jacobson's novels The Mighty Walzer (1999) and Kalooki Nights (2006). It has also been cited by Hungarian-Canadian physician Gabor Maté, whose grandparents were killed in Auschwitz, as the "book that changed his life." Activist Tony Greenstein said it was the first book he ever read and that it influenced him to consider "how hateful human beings could be to other human beings."

Filmmaker Mark Forstater authored I Survived a Secret Nazi Extermination Camp, in which he reflects on his extended family who died in the Majdanek concentration camp and Belzec extermination camp. Forstater reveals his first sight of a naked woman to be in a picture of Belzec inmates running to their deaths featured in The Scourge of the Swastika.
