= Michael Allenby, 3rd Viscount Allenby =

British politician and hereditary peer (1931–2014)

The Right Honourable The Viscount Allenby

Member of the House of Lords
- Lord Temporal
- Hereditary peer 8 January 1985 – 11 November 1999
- Preceded by: The 2nd Viscount Allenby
- Succeeded by: Seat abolished
- Elected Hereditary Peer; 11 November 1999 – 3 October 2014
- Election: 1999
- Preceded by: Seat established
- Succeeded by: The 3rd Baron Russell of Liverpool

Personal details
- Born: 20 April 1931
- Died: 3 October 2014 (aged 83)

Lieutenant-Colonel Michael Jaffray Hynman Allenby, 3rd Viscount Allenby (20 April 1931 – 3 October 2014) was a British politician, hereditary peer, and horse welfare advocate.

== Early life ==
He was born in Camberley, Surrey, the only child of Dudley Allenby, 2nd Viscount Allenby, and his first wife, Gertrude Mary Lethbridge (née Champneys) Allenby (1905 - 1988). He was the great-nephew of Edmund Allenby, 1st Viscount Allenby, famed commander during the Second Boer War and the First World War.

He attended Eton and at the Royal Military Academy Sandhurst. He was commissioned a lieutenant in the 11th Hussars (later the Royal Hussars), which was stationed in Malaya between 1953 and 1956. He then served as aide-de-camp to the Governor of Cyprus (1957–1958), brigade major of the 51st Brigade in Hong Kong (1967–1969) and as commander of the Territorial Army Royal Yeomanry (1974–1977).

== Political career ==
After inheriting the title in 1984, Lord Allenby served as Deputy Speaker of the House of Lords from 1993 to 1999. Having lost his automatic right to a seat under the House of Lords Act 1999, he was elected to remain and sat as a crossbencher.

He had also been a patron of The British-Israel-World Federation, and he had been aiding and consulting excavations at Megiddo.

== Personal life ==
Allenby married Sara Margaret Wiggin in 1965, daughter of Lieutenant-Colonel Peter Milner Wiggin and Margaret Frances Livingstone-Learmonth. They had one son, Henry Jaffnay Hynman Allenby, who succeeded as 4th Viscount in 2014. Lady Allenby died in 2023.

Allenby had a lifelong interest in animal welfare, particularly equestrian welfare, and was patron of the International League for the Protection of Horses, a charity founded by Ada Cole and now called World Horse Welfare.

== Arms ==
Coat of arms of Michael Allenby, 3rd Viscount Allenby
Crest Issuant out of a crescent Gules a demi-lion Proper. Escutcheon Per bend Argent and Gules in the sinister three crescents two and one of the second and in the dexter three horses' heads erased one and two of the first all within a bordure Azure. Supporters Dexter a horse reguardant Or sinister a camel reguardant Argent. Motto Fide Et Labore

Peerage of the United Kingdom
Preceded by Dudley Jaffray Hynman Allenby	Viscount Allenby; 1984–2014; Member of the House of Lords (1985–1999)	Succeeded by Henry Jaffray Hynman Allenby
Parliament of the United Kingdom
New office created by the House of Lords Act 1999	Elected hereditary peer to the House of Lords under the House of Lords Act 1999; 1999–2014	Succeeded by The Lord Russell of Liverpool
