= Baron Russell of Liverpool =

Barony in the Peerage of the United Kingdom

Barony Russell of Liverpool
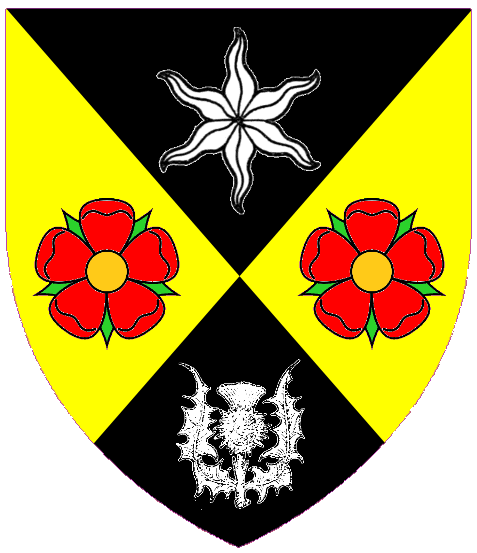
- Per saltire sable and or, in chief an estoile argent, two roses in fess gules, barbed and seeded proper, and in base a thistle leaved and slipped of the second
- Creation date: 9 October 1919
- Created by: King George V
- Peerage: Peerage of the United Kingdom
- First holder: Sir Edward Russell
- Present holder: Simon Russell, 3rd Baron Russell of Liverpool
- Heir apparent: Hon. Edward Russell
- Remainder to: Heirs male of the first baron's body lawfully begotten
- Motto: "More light"

Baron Russell of Liverpool, of Liverpool in the County Palatine of Lancaster, is a title in the Peerage of the United Kingdom. It was created in 1919 for Sir Edward Russell. He served as editor of the Liverpool Daily Post for almost fifty years and also briefly represented Glasgow Bridgeton in the House of Commons as a Liberal.

His three sons predeceased him. His grandson, the second Baron, was a lawyer and author who earned the Military Cross in the First World War. As Deputy Judge Advocate General to the British Army of the Rhine he was one of the chief legal advisers during the war crimes trials held in Nuremberg and Tokyo at the end of the Second World War.

As of 2017, the title is held by his grandson, the third Baron, who succeeded in 1981. He serves as an elected hereditary peer in the House of Lords having been elected at a by election in December 2014. He sits as a Crossbencher.

== Barons Russell of Liverpool (1919) and heirs ==
- Edward Richard Russell, 1st Baron Russell of Liverpool (1834–1920)
  - Richard Henry Langley Russell (1861–1899), predeceased his father the 1st Baron
- Edward Frederick Langley Russell, 2nd Baron Russell of Liverpool (1895–1981)
  - Captain the Hon. Langley Gordon Haslingden Russell (1922–1975), predeceased his father the 2nd Baron
- Simon Gordon Jared Russell, 3rd Baron Russell of Liverpool (b. 1952)

The heir apparent is the present holder's son the Hon. Edward Charles Stanley Russell (b. 1985).

Barons Russell of Liverpool line of succession
- Edward Richard Russell, 1st Baron Russell of Liverpool (1834—1920)
  - Richard Henry Langley Russell (1861—1899)
    - Edward Frederick Langley Russell, 2nd Baron Russell of Liverpool (1895—1981)
      - Hon. Langley Gordon Haslingden Russell (1922—1975)
        - Simon Gordon Jared Russell, 3rd Baron Russell of Liverpool (b. 1952)
          - (1) Hon. Edward Charles Stanley Russell (b. 1985)
          - (2) Hon. William Francis Langley Russell (b. 1988)
        - (3) Hon. Adam Mark Haslingden Russell (b. 1957)
        - (4) Hon. Daniel Charles Edward Russell (b. 1962)
