= Edward Russell, 1st Baron Russell of Liverpool =

The Right Honourable The Lord Russell of Liverpool
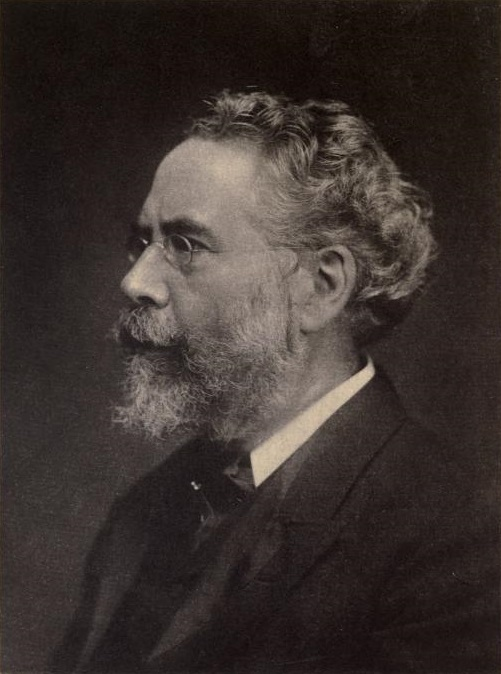
- Portrait of Edward Russell, 1st Baron Russell of Liverpool

Member of Parliament for Glasgow Bridgeton
- In office 19 December 1885 – 24 July 1887
- Preceded by: Constituency created
- Succeeded by: Sir George Trevelyan

Personal details
- Born: 9 August 1834 London, England
- Died: 20 February 1920 (aged 85)
- Occupation: Journalist, politician

Edward Richard Russell, 1st Baron Russell of Liverpool (9 August 1834 – 20 February 1920), was a British journalist and Liberal politician.

Russell was a newspaper man who also involved himself in politics. Born in London, he was largely self-made, rising to become Editor of the Liverpool Daily Post, a position he held for almost fifty years. He is reputed to have been a man of great ability, with high religious and moral standards. Well-travelled, an advocate of Temperance, and regarded as an able public speaker, he supported the Liberal Party and was a founder of the Liverpool Parliamentary Debating Society. He corresponded with leading figures of the day, for example Annie Besant and H. H. Asquith. In 1865 he left Liverpool for London where he worked for the Morning Star and other newspapers. In writing parliamentary reports, he came to know members of the government and was a friend of William Ewart Gladstone.

When Russell returned to Liverpool in 1869, as editor of the Daily Post, which, under his leadership, became known as a leading provincial newspaper. From 1885 to 1887 Russell was Liberal MP for the constituency of Glasgow Bridgeton, then in 1893 he was knighted. In 1919, the year before his death, he was raised to the peerage as Baron Russell of Liverpool, of Liverpool in the County Palatine of Lancaster.

== Works ==
- Irving as Hamlet (1875)
- True Macbeth: A Lecture (1875)
- Ibsen: A Lecture Delivered at University College, Liverpool (1894)
- Garrick: A Lecture (1895)
- That Reminds Me (1899)
- Arrested Fugitives (1912)

== Arms ==
Coat of arms of Edward Russell, 1st Baron Russell of Liverpool
Crest An owl wings expanded Argent beaked and legged Or resting the dexter claw and estoile Azure. Escutcheon Per saltire Sable and Or in chief an estoile Argent two roses in fess Gules barbed and seeded Proper and in base a thistle leaved and slipped of the second. Supporters On either side an owl Argent beaked and legged Or gorged with a chaplet of roses Gules leaved Vert. Motto More Light

== Notes ==
Parliament of the United Kingdom
New constituency	Member of Parliament for Glasgow Bridgeton; 1885–1887	Succeeded by Sir George Trevelyan
Peerage of the United Kingdom
New creation	Baron Russell of Liverpool; 1919–1920	Succeeded by Edward Frederick Langley Russell
