= Allenby, Toronto =

Allenby
- Neighbourhood
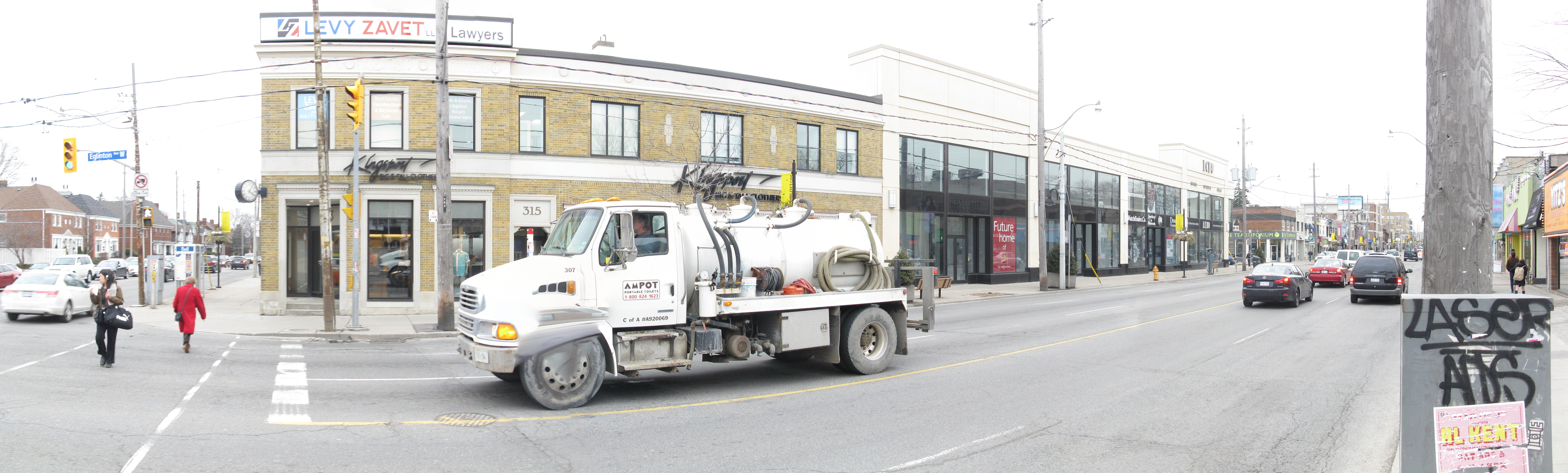
- Allenby from northeast corner of Avenue Road and Eglinton Avenue

- Location within Toronto
- Coordinates: 43.7096995°N 79.4151072°W
- Country: Canada
- Province: Ontario
- City: Toronto

Allenby is a neighbourhood of Toronto, Ontario, Canada. It is a primarily residential neighbourhood within the boundaries of Latimer Avenue to the west, Briar Hill Avenue to the north, Avenue Road to the east and Eglinton Avenue West to the south.

== History ==
In the location of Allenby Public School was located a Huron village. The village was determined to be in existence from the 1450s, centred around a natural spring of water. The village would likely have been a village of the Iroquoian Wyandot people (Huron). The Wyandot people moved out of the Toronto area in the 1600s to the area around Lake Huron and Georgian Bay. The site of the village is known as the "Jackes Site". A plaque marks the location on the outside of Allenby Public School.

The present neighbourhood was developed in the 1920s, centred around Allenby Junior Public School. Allenby School is named after Edmund Allenby, 1st Viscount Allenby (1861–1936), a British field marshal.

Bordering upper Forest Hill, Allenby has a large Jewish population (35%), according to the 2021 census.
