= Dudley Allenby, 2nd Viscount Allenby =

British soldier and peer (1903–1984)

- Born: Dudley Jaffray Hynman Allenby; 8 January 1903; Malta
- Died: 17 July 1984 (aged 81)
- Military career
- Allegiance: United Kingdom
- Branch: British Army
- Service years: 1923–1946
- Rank: Lieutenant-Colonel
- Units: 11th Hussars, Royal Gloucestershire Hussars

Lieutenant-Colonel Dudley Jaffray Hynman Allenby, 2nd Viscount Allenby (8 January 1903 – 17 July 1984), was a British peer and soldier.

== Background and education ==
Allenby was born at Malta on 8 January 1903, the son of Captain Frederick Claude Hynman Allenby and Edith Mabel (née Jaffray) Allenby. His father was an officer in the Royal Navy. He attended Eton, and the Royal Military College, Sandhurst. He succeeded his uncle as 2nd Viscount Allenby on the latter's death on 14 May 1936.

== Career ==
Allenby joined the 11th Hussars in 1923, served in India, 1923–26, after which he served as an Adjutant in the 11th Hussars, 1926–30. He was an instructor at the Royal Military College, Sandhurst, from 1930 to 1934. He attained the rank of captain in 1936, served in Egypt, 1934–37. He served as an adjutant in the Army Fighting Vehicles School, 1937–40; he became a major, 1938. He was second in command of the Royal Gloucestershire Hussars, 1940–42, and a lieutenant-colonel of the 2nd Derbyshire Yeomanry from 1942. He retired in 1946.

== Family ==
Lord Allenby married firstly, Gertrude Mary Lethbridge Champneys (1905 - 1988), daughter of Edward Geoffrey Stanley Champneys, on 10 July 1930. They had one son:

- Michael Allenby, 3rd Viscount Allenby (1931–2014)

The couple were divorced in 1949. Allenby married secondly, Daisy Hancox (d. 1985), daughter of Charles Francis Hancox, on 13 April 1949.

== Arms ==
Coat of arms of Dudley Allenby, 2nd Viscount Allenby
Crest Issuant out of a crescent Gules a demi-lion Proper. Escutcheon Per bend Argent and Gules in the sinister three crescents two and one of the second and in the dexter three horses' heads erased one and two of the first all within a bordure Azure. Supporters Dexter a horse reguardant Or sinister a camel reguardant Argent. Motto Fide Et Labore

Peerage of the United Kingdom
Preceded by Edmund Henry Hynman Allenby	Viscount Allenby; 1936–1984	Succeeded by Michael Jaffray Hynman Allenby
