= Viscount Allenby =

Viscountcy in the Peerage of the United Kingdom

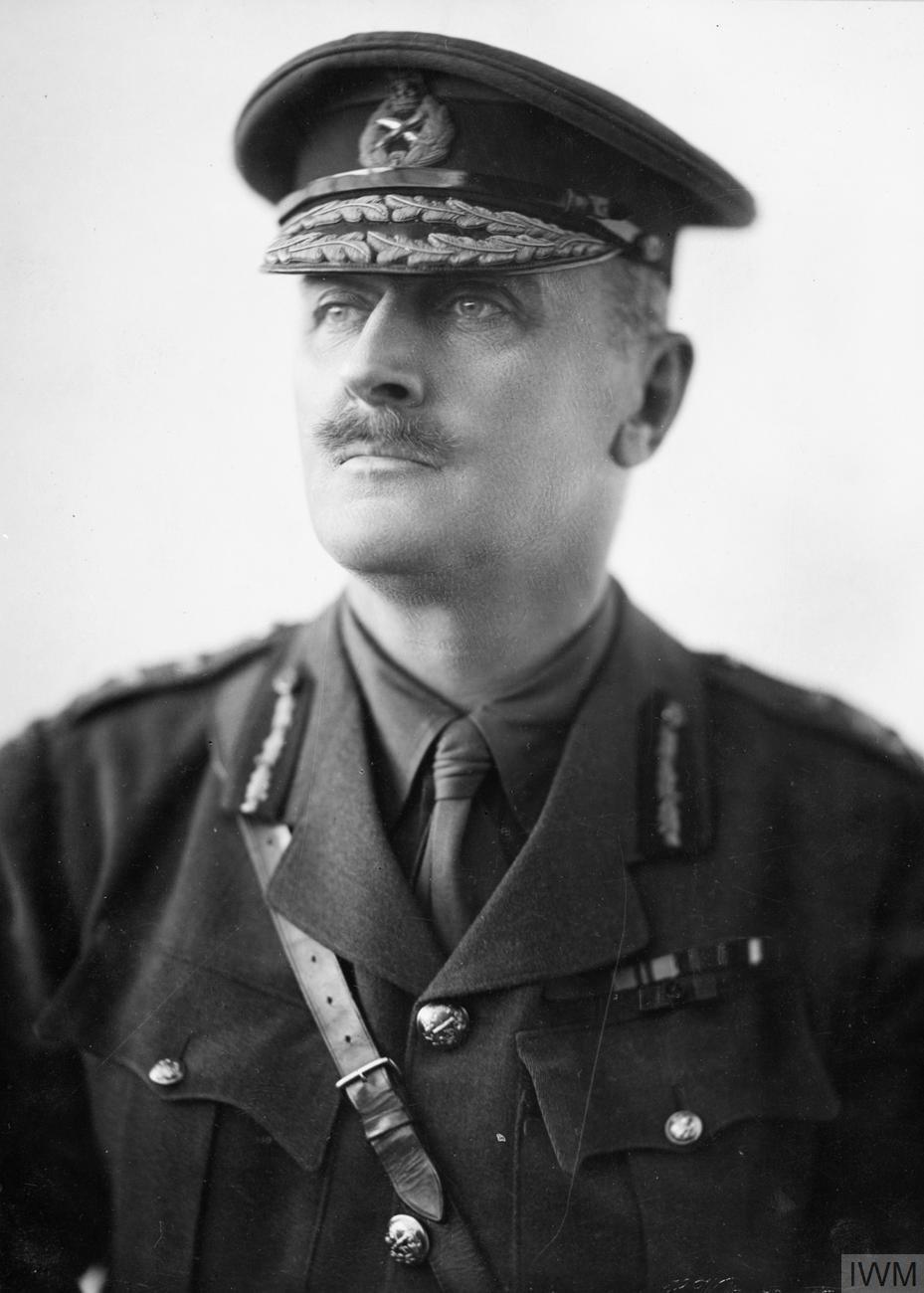
Edmund Allenby, 1st Viscount Allenby

Viscount Allenby, of Megiddo and of Felixstowe in the County of Suffolk, is a title in the Peerage of the United Kingdom. It was created on 7 October 1919 for the prominent military commander Field Marshal Sir Edmund Allenby, with remainder, in default of male issue of his own, to his younger brother Captain Frederick Claude Hynman Allenby and his heirs male lawfully begotten. The first Viscount's son was killed in action on the Western Front in 1917.

The creation of the peerage was accompanied by a financial grant of £50,000, equivalent to £2,232,154 in 2025.

The first Viscount was succeeded according to a special remainder by his nephew Captain Dudley Allenby, the second Viscount. The latter's son, the third Viscount, who succeeded in 1984 was one of the ninety elected hereditary peers that remain in the House of Lords after the passing of the House of Lords Act 1999, and sat as a crossbencher. As of 2020, the title is held by his son, the 4th Viscount, who succeeded in 2014.

The family seat is Newnham Lodge, near Hook, Hampshire.

== Viscounts Allenby (1919) ==
- Edmund Henry Hynman Allenby, 1st Viscount Allenby (1861–1936)
  - Lt. Horace Michael Hynman Allenby, MC (1898–1917), only son of the 1st Viscount, killed in action before Viscountcy bestowed on his father.
  - Captain Frederick Claude Hynman Allenby, CBE, JP, RN (1864–1934), younger brother of the 1st Viscount, next in line through the special remainder.
- Dudley Jaffray Hynman Allenby, 2nd Viscount Allenby (1903–1984), nephew of the 1st Viscount, son of Frederick Allenby.
- Michael Jaffray Hynman Allenby, 3rd Viscount Allenby (1931–2014), only son of the 2nd Viscount
- Henry Jaffray Hynman Allenby, 4th Viscount Allenby (born 1968), only son of the 3rd Viscount

== Present peer ==
Henry Jaffnay Hynman Allenby, 4th Viscount Allenby of Megiddo, the only son of the third Viscount Allenby and his wife Sara Margaret Wiggin, daughter of Lt. Colonel Peter Milner Wiggin, was born on 29 July 1968. On 29 September 1996 he married Louise Victoria Green, daughter of Michael Green, of Sands Farm, Faringdon. They have two sons, Harry Michael Edmund Allenby (born 2000, heir apparent) and Charles Michael James Allenby (born 2004).

He succeeded as Viscount Allenby on the death of his father in May 2014.

Allenby owns a company which manages woodlands and hedgerows. In December 2017, he was a guest of honour at the Tower of David Museum in Jerusalem, which staged a commemoration of General Allenby's capture of the city in 1917. He commented "To understand about Field Marshal Allenby you have to go to a museum. There were no movies made about him, as there were about Lawrence of Arabia."

== Family tree ==
Viscount Allenby
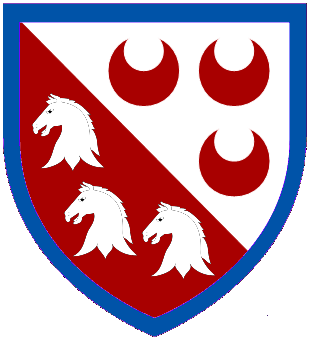
- Crest: Issuant out of a crescent Gules a demi-lion Proper.
- Shield: Per bend Argent and Gules in the sinister three crescents two and one of the second and in the dexter three horses' heads erased one and two of the first all within a bordure Azure.
- Supporters: Dexter a horse reguardant Or sinister a camel reguardant Argent.
- Motto: Fide et Labore

Viscount Allenby family tree

Hynman Allenby (1823–1879)
Viscount Allenby of Megiddo and of Felixstowe in the County of Suffolk, 1919
Edmund Henry Hynman Allenby; 1st Viscount Allenby (1861–1936)	Frederick Claude Hynman Allenby (1864–1934)
Horace Michael Hynman Allenby (1898–1917)	Dudley Jaffray Hynman Allenby; 2nd Viscount Allenby (1903–1984)
Michael Jaffray Hynman Allenby; 3rd Viscount Allenby (1921–2014)
Henry Jaffray Hynman Allenby; 4th Viscount Allenby (b. 1968)
Harry Michael Edmund Allenby (b. 2000)
