= Richard Allanby =

Australian cricketer (born 1971)

Personal information
- Full name: Richard Andrew Clifton Allanby
- Born: 26 July 1971 (age 55); Hobart, Tasmania, Australia
- Batting: Left-handed
- Bowling: Leg break googly
- Relatives: Nick Allanby (brother)

Domestic team information
- Years: Team
- 1994/95–1996/97: Tasmania

Career statistics
Competition	FC	LA
Matches	2	2
Runs scored	52	33
Batting average	17.33	16.5
100s/50s	0/0	0/0
Top score	29	17
Balls bowled	18	0
Wickets	0	–
Bowling average	–	–
5 wickets in innings	0	–
10 wickets in match	0	–
Best bowling	–	–
Catches/stumpings	2/–	1/–
- Source: Cricinfo, 3 January 2011

Richard Andrew Clifton Allanby (born 26 July 1971) is a former Australian cricketer who played for Tasmania. He attended the Australian Cricket Academy in 1994 and toured to New Zealand with them in 1994/95. He is the younger brother of former Tasmanian first-class player Nick Allanby.
