= Allenby Square =

Square in Jerusalem

Coordinates: 31.789682°N 35.204093°E

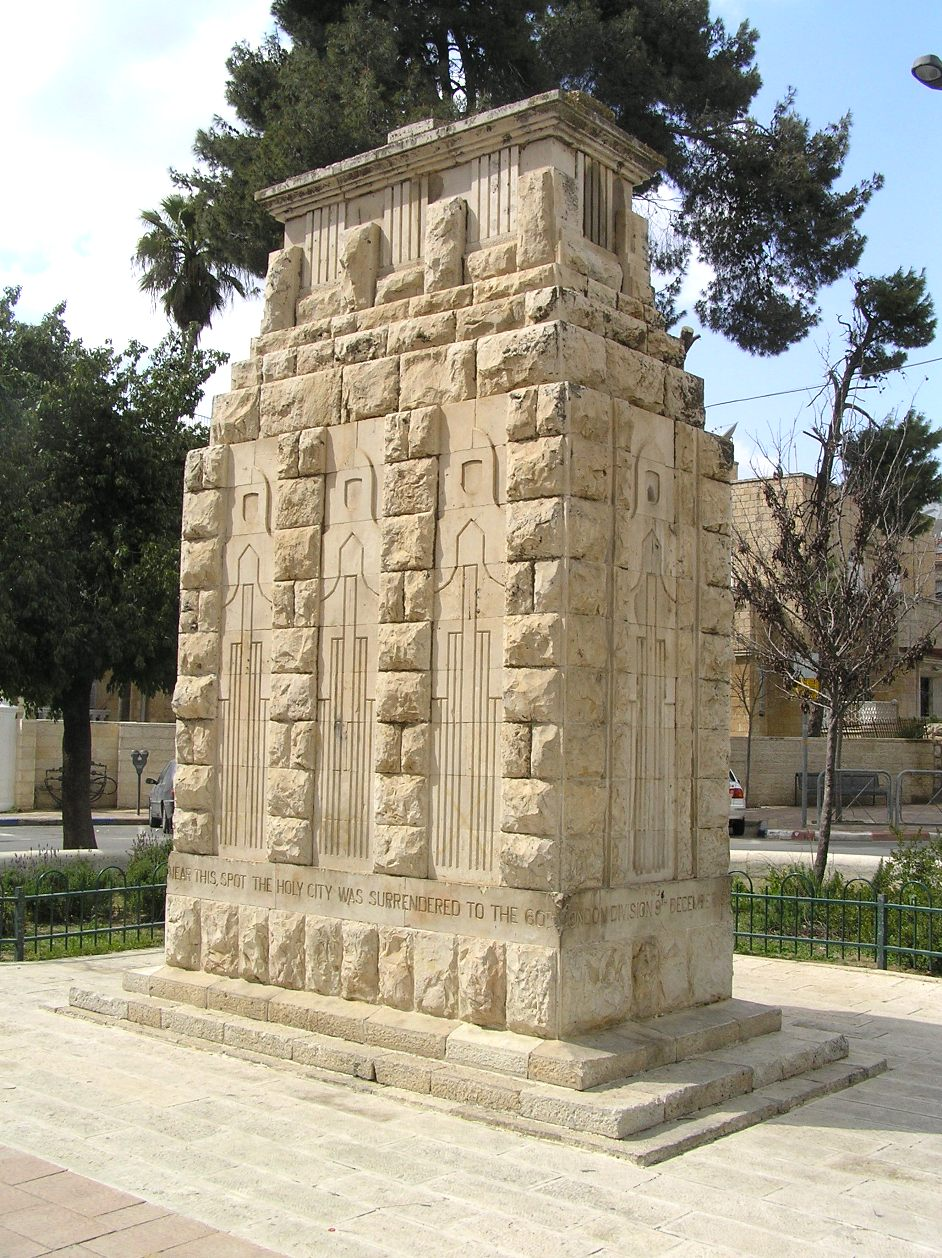
British WWI memorial (cenotaph) in the present Allenby Square.

Allenby Square, a name commemorating Field Marshal Edmund Allenby who commanded the British forces which captured Palestine in the First World War, has been bestowed at different times on two different squares in Jerusalem.

This divergent naming was connected both to prestige struggles within the British forces entering Jerusalem in late 1917, leading to what became known as "the multiple surrenders", and to later vicissitudes of the struggle between Israelis and Arabs for control of the city.

== The multiple surrenders ==
The British Army advanced along the Jaffa-Jerusalem Highway and approached Jerusalem. During the night between 8–9 December 1917, the Ottoman Army withdrew, sparing Jerusalem what might have been a bloody and destructive battle.

On the following day the Palestinian Mayor of Jerusalem, Hussein Salim Al Husseiny, set out to tender the city's formal surrender to the British. Near the Shaare Tzedek Hospital, at what was then the sparsely populated western outskirts of Jerusalem, he met with a couple of British kitchen sergeants, and - not familiar with British military rank insignia - tendered the capitulation to them.

However, the officer in charge was displeased with this informal ceremony, and held a second surrender ceremony on the same windswept hill, with his own participation; a higher officer demanded and got a third one, still in the same location; and finally, Field Marshal Allenby insisted on still a fourth and final one, held this time at a different location - just outside the Jaffa Gate of the Old City, which Allenby then ceremoniously entered, making the point of dismounting and entering on foot out of respect for its religious significance. The Mayor of Jerusalem was not present at the final surrender, having caught pneumonia from too much standing on the exposed hill in the cold mountain winter. Allenby visited him in the hospital.

Due to these manoeuvres, there were two competing Days of the Surrender of Jerusalem (9 and 11 December) and two locations: the hill where the original ceremony took place, and the Jaffa Gate where Allenby's ceremony was held. These discrepancies left still-tangible traces on the map of Jerusalem.

== The monument ==
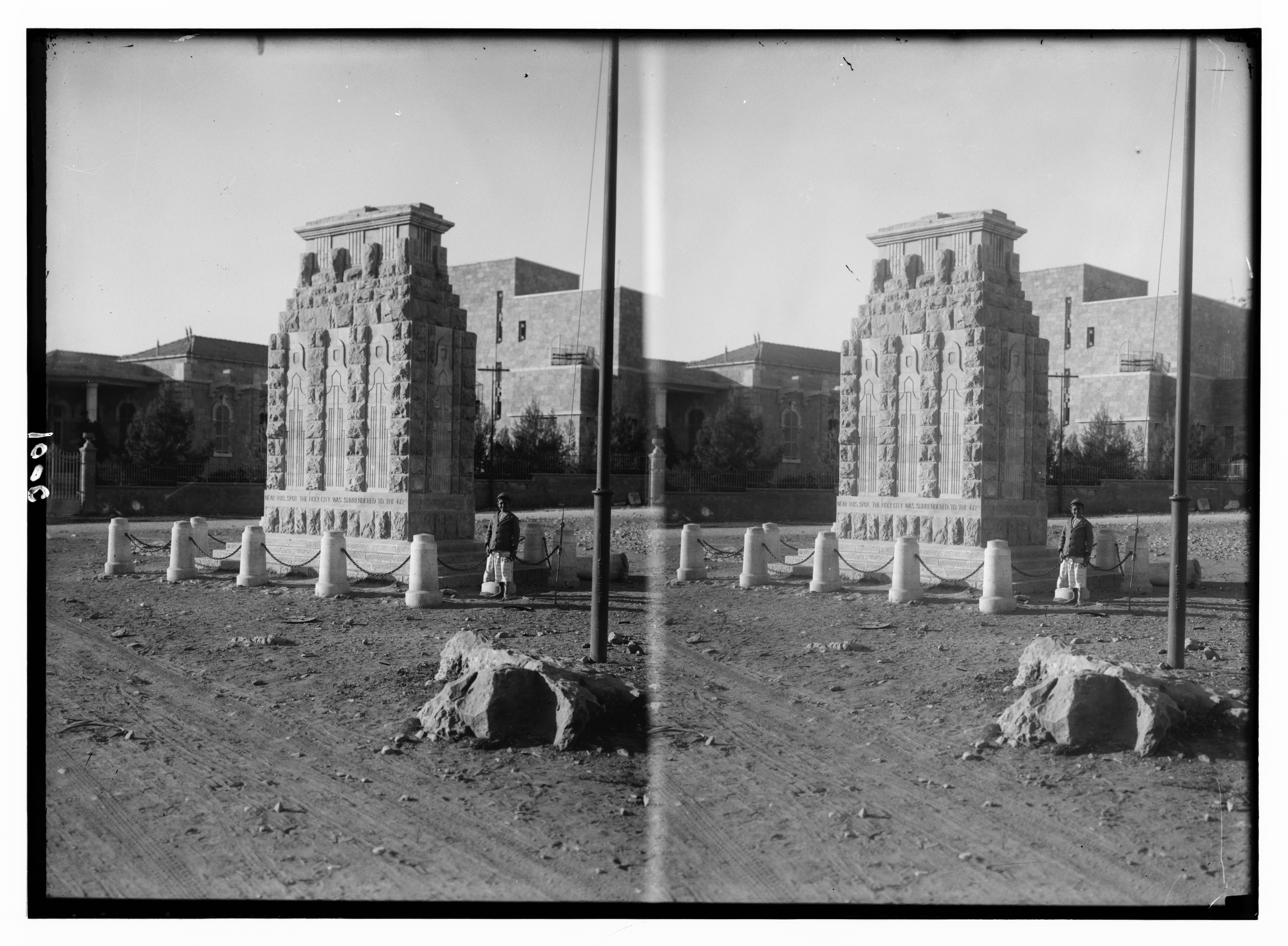
The 1920 Allenby monument.

In 1920, a British war memorial was erected on the hill where the first surrender ceremony took place.

The three-metre high rectangular monument, similar in style to other British WWI memorials, usually designated as cenotaphs, was designed by Ernest Wallcousins. It bore the date of 9 December (the actual surrender day, rather than 11, the date of the ceremonial surrender), with the text:

Near this spot, the Holy City was surrendered to the 60th London Division, 9th December 1917.
Erected by their comrades to those officers, NCOs and men who fell in fighting for Jerusalem.

The monument carries reliefs on all four sides schematically depicting medieval knights resting their arms on long swords, a reference to the comparison made at the time by many Britons between the 1917 conquest of Palestine and the Crusades. An equestrian statue of Allenby was planned to stand on top of the memorial, but was never actually installed.

== The first Allenby Square, now IDF Square ==
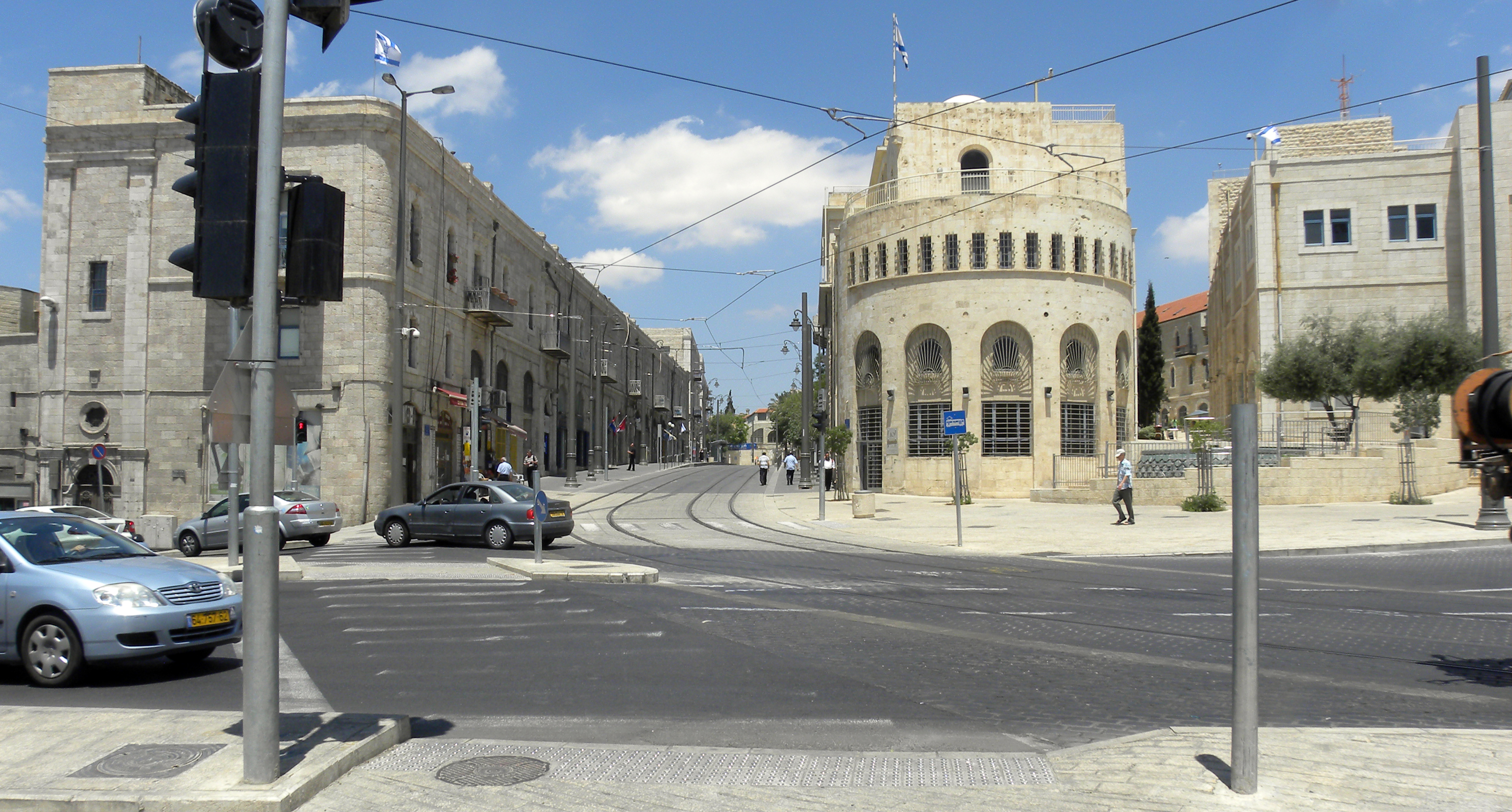
IDF Square (Kikar Tzahal).

The hill where the first surrender took place was at that time on the western edge of Jerusalem, a few kilometres west of the walls of the Old City. Allenby though held his ceremony at the square right next to Jaffa Gate, which was then named "Allenby Square."

Throughout the years of British rule in Mandatory Palestine, Allenby Square was in the midst of a bustling thoroughfare. However, with the outbreak of the 1948 Arab–Israeli War, the square became part of the battlefield, separating first the Jewish and Arab militias from each other, and later the newly formed Israel Defense Forces (IDF) from the Jordanian Arab Legion. The 1949 Armistice Agreements placed Allenby Square partially within the no-man's-land, and it remained as part of the dividing "City Line" until the conquest and annexation of East Jerusalem in 1967.

In 1967 the Israeli authorities decided to change the name of the square to "IDF Square" (ככר צה"ל, Kikar Tzahal), which is its name up to the present.

== The second Allenby Square in Romema ==
During the British period, the 1920 monument, in the midst of an empty field, became gradually surrounded by the houses of the Romema neighborhood. After the creation of Israel, the Jerusalem Municipality surrounded it by an elliptical fence and planted some bushes; however, it was not officially declared a city square or given a name, and the area became increasingly neglected.

Allenby, whose memory is regarded with some favour in official Israel, was deprived in 1967 of "his" square, and the authorities decided to bestow the name on this neglected area around the monument - though some commentators objected, stating that Allenby's staged surrender ceremony had not taken place at that spot. Nevertheless, the name was bestowed on the Romema square.

It remained, however, rather neglected: only in 1994 did the municipality make the effort, after many protests by neighbours, to establish a proper playground for the Romema children, right next to the memorial. It was further refurbished, with new paving and lighting, when the new Jerusalem Central Bus Station was created nearby.
