= Edmund Allenby, 1st Viscount Allenby =

British Field Marshal (1861–1936)

Field Marshal The Right Honourable The Viscount Allenby GCB GCMG GCVO
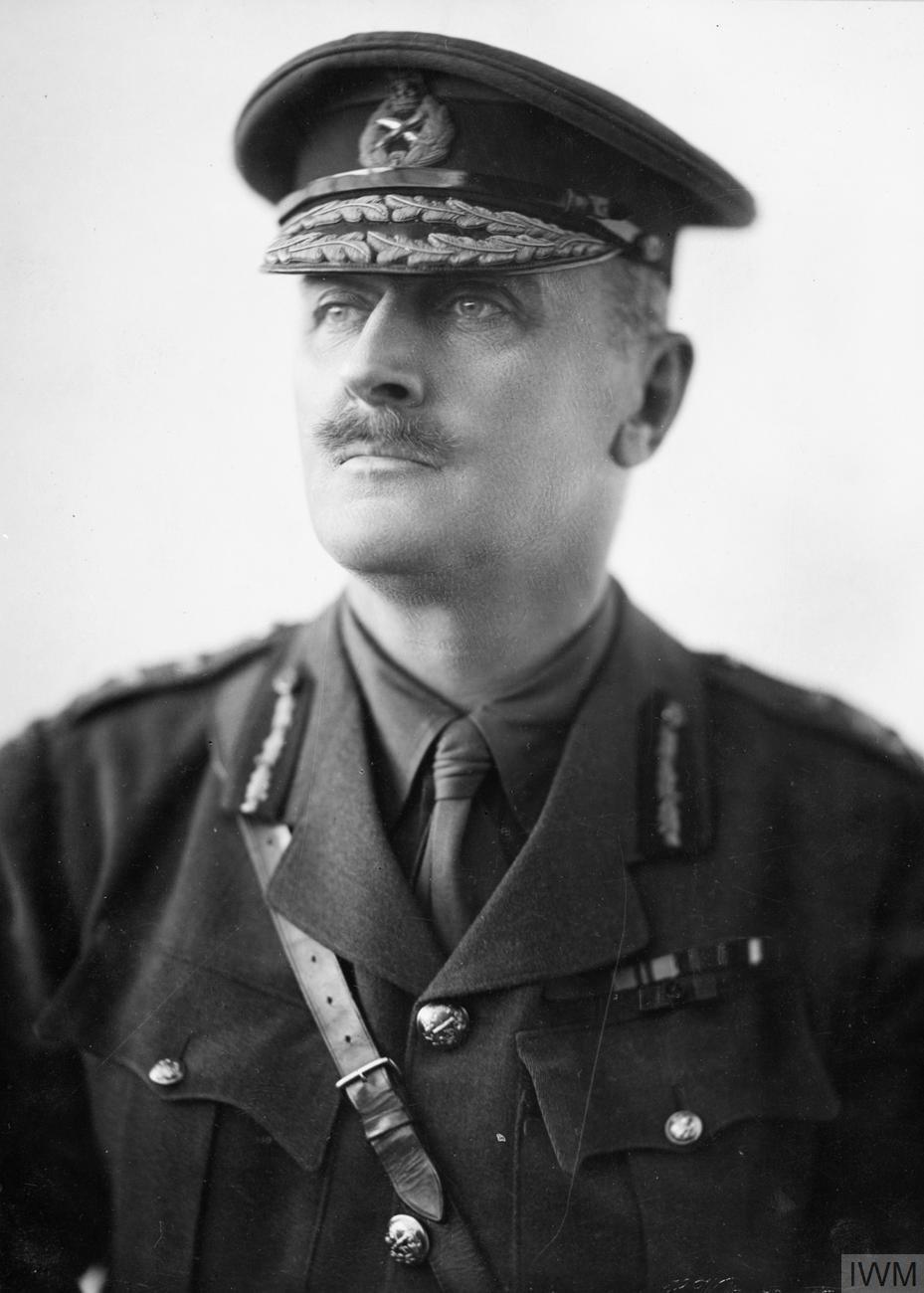
- Allenby in 1917

High Commissioner in Egypt
- In office October 1919 – June 1925
- Monarch: George V
- Preceded by: Reginald Wingate
- Succeeded by: George Lloyd

Personal details
- Born: 23 April 1861 Brackenhurst, Nottinghamshire, England
- Died: 14 May 1936 (aged 75) Kensington, London, England
- Resting place: Westminster Abbey
- Spouse(s): Adelaide Mabel Chapman, Viscountess Allenby of Megiddo
- Nickname: The Bloody Bull or The Bull

Military service
- Allegiance: United Kingdom
- Branch/service: British Army
- Years of service: 1880–1925
- Rank: Field Marshal
- Commands: Egyptian Expeditionary Force; British Third Army; V Corps; Cavalry Corps; 1st Cavalry Division; 4th Cavalry Brigade; 5th Royal Irish Lancers; 6th (Inniskilling) Dragoons
- Battles/wars: Second Boer War; First World War; Western Front; Battle of Mons; Retreat from Mons; First Battle of Ypres; Second Battle of Ypres; Battle of Arras; Sinai and Palestine Campaign; Battle of Beersheba; Battle of Hareira and Sheria; Battle of Mughar Ridge; Battle of Jerusalem; Battle of Tell 'Asur; First Transjordan attack on Amman; Second Transjordan attack on Shunet Nimrin and Es Salt; Battle of Megiddo; Capture of Damascus; Pursuit to Haritan
- Awards: Knight Grand Cross of the Order of the Bath; Knight Grand Cross of the Order of St Michael and St George; Knight Grand Cross of the Royal Victorian Order; Full list

Field Marshal Edmund Henry Hynman Allenby, 1st Viscount Allenby, GCB, GCMG, GCVO (23 April 1861 – 14 May 1936) was a senior British Army officer and imperial governor. He fought in the Second Boer War and in the First World War, in which he led the British Empire's Egyptian Expeditionary Force (EEF) during the Sinai and Palestine Campaign against the Ottoman Empire in the conquest of Palestine.

The British succeeded in capturing Beersheba, Jaffa, and Jerusalem from October to December 1917. His forces occupied the Jordan Valley during the summer of 1918, then went on to capture northern Palestine and defeat the Ottoman Yildirim Army Group's Eighth Army at the Battle of Megiddo, forcing the Fourth and Seventh Army to retreat towards Damascus. Subsequently, the EEF Pursuit by Desert Mounted Corps captured Damascus and advanced into northern Syria.

During this pursuit, he commanded T. E. Lawrence ("Lawrence of Arabia"), whose campaign with Faisal's Arab Sherifial Forces assisted the EEF's capture of Ottoman territory and fought the Battle of Aleppo, five days before the Armistice of Mudros ended the campaign on 30 October 1918. He continued to serve in the region as High Commissioner in Egypt from 1919 until 1925.

== Early life ==
Allenby was born on 23 April 1861, the son of Hynman Allenby and Catherine Anne Allenby (née Cane) and was educated at Haileybury College. His father owned 2,000 acres (810 ha) in Norfolk and Felixstowe House, at Felixstowe, then a fishing village. This was a summer home until the family settled there permanently after Hynman Allenby's death in 1878.

Allenby had no great desire to be a soldier, and tried to enter the Indian Civil Service but failed the entry exam. He sat the exam for the Royal Military College, Sandhurst in 1880 and was commissioned as a subaltern, with the rank of lieutenant, in the 6th (Inniskilling) Dragoons on 10 May 1882. He joined his regiment in South Africa later that year, taking part in the Bechuanaland Expedition of 1884–85. After serving at the cavalry depot in Canterbury, he was promoted to captain on 10 January 1888 and then returned to South Africa.

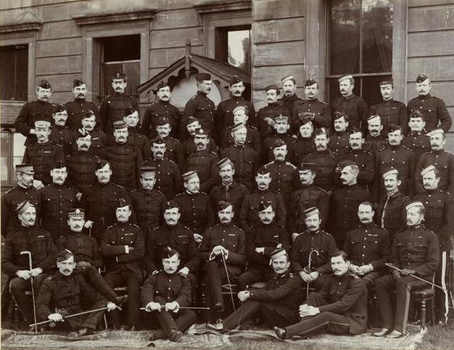
Officers, many of whom later became generals, at the Staff College, Camberley, 1897. Seated in the second row, on the extreme left, is Captain Allenby.

Allenby returned to Britain in 1890 and he sat – and failed – the entry exam for the Staff College at Camberley. Not deterred, he sat the exam again the next year and passed. Captain Douglas Haig of the 7th Hussars also entered the college at the same time, thus beginning a rivalry between the two that ran until the First World War. Allenby was more popular with fellow officers, even being made Master of the Draghounds in preference to Haig who was the better rider; Allenby had already developed a passion for polo. Their contemporary James Edward Edmonds later claimed that the staff at the Staff College thought Allenby dull and stupid but were impressed by a speech that he gave to the Farmers' Dinner, which had in fact been written for him by Edmonds and another.

He was promoted to major on 19 May 1897 and was posted to the 3rd Cavalry Brigade, then serving in Ireland, as the brigade major in March 1898.

== Second Boer War ==
Following the outbreak of the Second Boer War in October 1899, Allenby returned to his regiment, and the Inniskillings embarked at Queenstown and landed at Cape Town, Cape Colony, later that year. He took part in the actions at Colesberg on 11 January 1900, Klip Drift on 15 February 1900 and Dronfield Ridge on 16 February 1900, and was mentioned in dispatches by the commander-in-chief, Lord Roberts on 31 March 1900.

Allenby was appointed to command the squadron of New South Wales Lancers, who were camped beside the Australian Light Horse outside Bloemfontein. Both men and horses suffered from the continuous rain and men with cases of enteric fever were taken away every day. Allenby soon established himself as a strict disciplinarian, according to A. B. Paterson even imposing a curfew on the officers' mess.

Allenby participated in the actions at Zand River on 10 May 1900, Kalkheuval Pass on 3 June 1900, Barberton on 12 September 1900 and Tevreden on 16 October 1900 when the Boer General Jan Smuts was defeated. He was promoted to local lieutenant-colonel on 1 January 1901, and to local colonel on 29 April 1901. In a despatch dated 23 June 1902, Lord Kitchener, Commander-in-Chief during the latter part of the war, described him as "a popular and capable Cavalry Brigadier". For his services during the war, he was appointed a Companion of the Order of the Bath (CB) in the South Africa honours list published on 26 June 1902, and he received the actual decoration from King Edward VII during an investiture at Buckingham Palace on 24 October 1902.

== In between wars ==
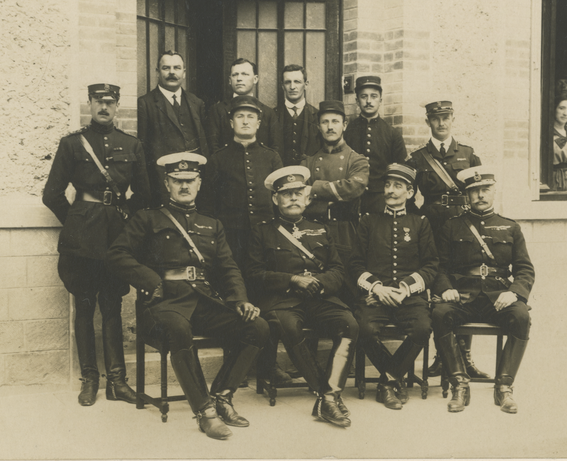
British and French officers at French manoeuvres, 1914. Major General Allenby is seated in the front row on the extreme left, with Lieutenant General Sir James Grierson to his left.

Allenby returned to Britain in 1902 and became commanding officer of the 5th Royal Irish Lancers in Colchester with the substantive rank of lieutenant-colonel on 2 August 1902, and the brevet rank of colonel from 22 August 1902. On 19 October 1905 he was promoted to the substantive rank of colonel and to the temporary rank of brigadier general when he assumed command of the 4th Cavalry Brigade. He was promoted to the rank of major-general on 10 September 1909 and was appointed inspector of cavalry on 25 April 1910 due to his extensive cavalry experience. He was nicknamed "The Bull" due to an increasing tendency for sudden bellowing outbursts of explosive rage directed at his subordinates, combined with his powerful physical frame. Allenby stood 6 ft 2 in (1.88 m) with a barrel chest and his very bad temper made "The Bull" a figure who inspired much consternation among those who had to work under him.

== First World War ==
During the First World War, Allenby initially served on the Western Front. At the outbreak of war in August 1914, a British Expeditionary Force (BEF) was sent to France, under the command of Field Marshal Sir John French. It consisted of four infantry divisions (the 1st, 2nd, 3rd and 5th, with the 4th and 6th being held in Britain) and one cavalry division, the latter commanded by Allenby. The cavalry division first saw action in semi-chaotic circumstances covering the retreat after the Battle of Mons opposing the German Army's invasion of France. One of Allenby's subordinates claimed at the time: "He cannot explain verbally, with any lucidity at all, what his plans are". When a headquarters officer asked why Brigadier-General Hubert Gough's cavalry brigade was miles from where it was supposed to be, he received the reply: "He told me he was getting as far away from the Bull as possible. It was a most scandalous affair, and he was in an almost open rebellion against Allenby at the time". (Note: During the retreat from Mons, Allenby clashed with Gough, his subordinate then commanding the 3rd Cavalry Brigade. Gough wrote in 1930 that "we were kept in such ignorance of the entire situation" by "that stupid man Allenby", and he claimed to have not known the whole story of what had been going on until he read General Horace Smith-Dorrien's memoirs. [Farrar-Hockley 1975, p. 352]) The division distinguished itself under Allenby's direction in the subsequent fighting, with minimal resources at its disposal, at the First Battle of Ypres.

=== Western Front ===
Allenby was promoted to temporary lieutenant general on 10 October 1914. As the BEF was expanded in size to two armies, he was rewarded by being made commander of the Cavalry Corps. On 6 May 1915, Allenby voluntarily left the Cavalry Arm to take up command of V Corps which was engaged at that moment in severe fighting at the Second Battle of Ypres. Commanding a corps seemed to make Allenby's bad temper even worse where anything from a split infinitive in a staff paper to discovering a corpse in the field without the tin helmet that Allenby ordered his men to wear sent Allenby off into a rage. The V Corps was victorious in defeating the German assault but incurred controversially heavy losses in the process through Allenby's tactical policy of continual counterattacks at the German attacking force. In September 1915, V Corps attempted a diversion of German strength to facilitate the concurrent British offensive at Loos. They executed a minor attack in the Hooge Sector in the Ypres Salient under Allenby's direction, which once again incurred substantial losses to its units involved in the affair.

In October 1915, Allenby was promoted to the temporary rank of general to lead the Third Army of the BEF, being made lieutenant general (substantive rank) on 1 January 1916 "for distinguished service in the Field". In the mid-summer of 1916, he was the army commander in support of the launch of the Battle of the Somme, with responsibility for the abortive assault by Third Army troops on the trench fortress of the Gommecourt salient, which failed with severe casualties to the units under his command in the operation. By this time in 1916, Archibald Wavell, who was one of Allenby's staff officers and supporters, wrote that Allenby's temper seemed to "confirm the legend that 'the Bull' was merely a bad-tempered, obstinate hot-head, a 'thud-and-blunder' general". Allenby harboured doubts about the leadership of the commander of the BEF, General Sir Douglas Haig, who had replaced Field Marshal French as commander-in-chief (C-in-C) of the BEF in December 1915, (and with whom Allenby had clashed at the Staff College some twenty years earlier) but refused to allow any of his officers to say anything critical about Haig. However, despite Allenby's rages and obsession with applying the rules in a way that often seemed petty, Allenby's staff officers found an intellectually curious general who was interested in finding new ways of breaking the stalemate. J. F. C. Fuller called Allenby "a man I grew to like and respect", a man who always asked his staff if they had any new ideas about how to win the war. Allenby had wider interests than many other British generals, reading books on every conceivable subject from botany to poetry and was noted for his critical intellect. An officer who had dinner with Allenby at his headquarters in a French château recalled:

His keen grey-blue eyes, under heavy brows, search the face while he probes the mind with sharp, almost staccato questions about everything under the sun except what is expected. He cannot suffer fools gladly and demands an unequivocal affirmative or negative to every query he makes. He has a habit of asking questions on the most abstruse subjects, and an unpleasant knack of catching out anyone who gives an evasive answer for the sake of politeness.

Many of Allenby's officers believed that he was incapable of any emotion except rage, but he was in fact a loving father and husband who was intensely concerned about his only child, Michael, who was serving at the front. Before Allenby went to bed every night, Allenby would enter the office of the officer who took the daily casualty returns, ask "Have you any news of my little boy today?" and after the officer replied "No news sir", Allenby would then go to bed a reassured man.

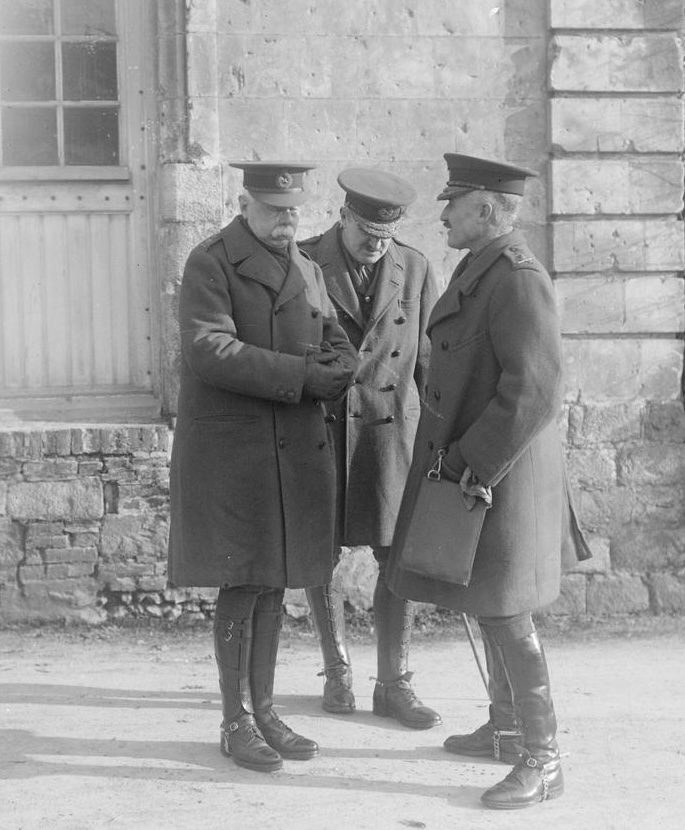
Allenby (centre), together with General Sir Herbert Plumer (left) and General Sir Henry Horne in conference at Camblain-Chatelain, France, 1916.

In early 1917, Allenby was ordered by Haig, now a field marshal, to start preparations for a major offensive around the city of Arras. During his planning Allenby insisted upon putting into practice many of the ideas that his staff officers had offered. Allenby rejected the normal week-long bombardment of the German trenches before making an assault, instead planning on a 48-hour bombardment before the assault went ahead. In addition, Allenby had made careful plans to control traffic in the rear to prevent traffic jams that would block his logistics, a second echelon behind the first echelon that would only be sent in to exploit successes, tunnels to bring up new divisions behind the German lines while avoiding German fire and finally new weapons like tanks and aircraft were to play prominent roles in the offensive. In March 1917, the Germans pulled back to the Hindenburg Line, which led Allenby to argue that the planned offensive in the Arras sector in April should be changed, a request Haig refused. Despite refusing Allenby's request for more time to change his plans, Haig informed him that the entire responsibility for the failure of the Arras offensive would rest with him. As the Zero Hour for the offensive at 5:30 am on 9 April 1917 approached, Allenby was thus unusually worried as he knew his entire career was in the balance.

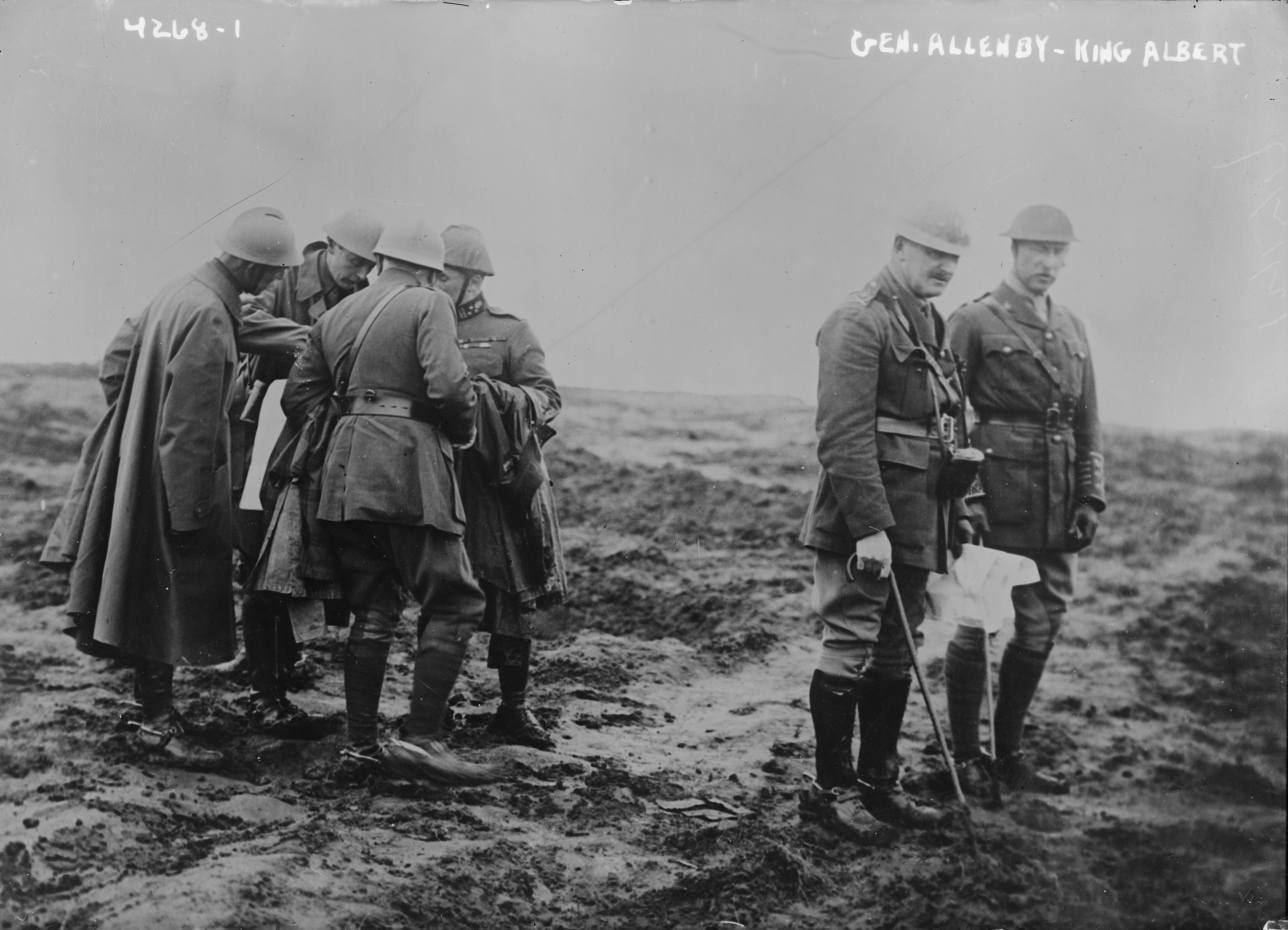
Allenby and King Albert I of Belgium.

At first, the Arras offensive went well with the Third Army breaking through the German lines and advancing three-and-a-half miles in one day. In a letter to his wife on 10 April 1917, Allenby wrote:

I had a very big success yesterday. I won all along the line; killed a host of Boche and took over 7,500 prisoners...We have, at last, brought off what I been working on all winter. My staff has been splendid.

There were weeks of heavy fighting during the Third Army's offensive at the Battle of Arras in the spring of the 1917, where an initial breakthrough had deteriorated into trench-fighting positional warfare—once more with heavy casualties to the Third Army's units involved. Allenby lost the confidence of the BEF's commander, Haig. He was promoted to substantive full general on 3 June 1917, "for distinguished service in the Field", but he was replaced at the head of the Third Army by Lieutenant-General Sir Julian Byng on 9 June 1917 and returned to England.

=== Egypt and Palestine ===
Drawing of Allenby by Francis Dodd, February 1917

==== British change of grand strategy ====
The British War cabinet was divided in debate in May 1917 over the allocation of British resources between the Western Front and other fronts, with Allied victory over Germany far from certain. George Curzon and Maurice Hankey recommended that Britain seize ground in the Middle East. David Lloyd George also wanted more effort on other fronts. Previously, leaders had been concerned that taking over Palestine would divide it and leave it for other countries to take, but repeated losses to the Turkish Army and the stalled Western Front changed their minds.

Lloyd George wanted a commander "of the dashing type" to replace Lieutenant General Sir Archibald Murray in command of the Egyptian Expeditionary Force (EEF). Jan Smuts refused the command (late May) unless promised resources for a decisive victory. Lloyd George appointed Allenby to the role, although it was not decided immediately whether he would be authorised to launch a major offensive. Allenby believed his new assignment would not make a serious contribution to the war effort, because he still believed that the war would be decided on the Western Front.

Although many of the War Cabinet wanted more efforts on the Palestine Front, the Chief of the Imperial General Staff (CIGS), General Sir William Robertson, believed that Western Front commitments did not justify a serious attempt to capture Jerusalem (Third Ypres was in progress from 31 July until November), and throughout 1917 he put pressure on Allenby to demand unrealistically large reinforcements to discourage the politicians from authorising Middle East offensives.

==== Palestine campaign ====
Allenby arrived on 27 June 1917. On 31 July 1917, he received a telegram from his wife saying that Michael Allenby had been killed in action, leading to Allenby's breaking down in tears in public while he recited a poem by Rupert Brooke. Afterwards, Allenby kept his grief to himself and his wife, and instead threw himself into his work with icy determination, working very long hours without a break. Wavell recalled: "He went on with his work and asked no sympathy. Only those who stood close to him knew how heavy the blow had been, how nearly it had broken him, and what courage it had taken to withstand it". Allenby assessed the Turkish Army's fighting force that he was facing to be 46,000 rifles and 2,800 sabres, and estimated that he could take Jerusalem with 7 infantry and 3 cavalry divisions. He did not feel that there was a sufficient military case to do so, and felt that he would need reinforcements to advance further. Allenby understood the problems posed by logistics in the desert and spent much time working to ensure his soldiers would be well supplied at all times, especially with water. The logistics of getting water to the soldiers and through the desert is thought to be the biggest challenge and accomplishment Allenby made in the Middle East campaign. Allenby also saw the importance of good medical treatment and insisted that proper medical facilities be created to treat all of the diseases common to the Middle East like ophthalmia and typhoid fever. Allenby was eventually ordered to attack the Turks in southern Palestine, but the extent of his advance was not yet to be decided, advice which Robertson repeated in "secret and personal" notes (1 and 10 August).

Due to his having seemingly fulfilled the prophecy which held that the Turks would leave Palestine "only when a prophet of God brought the Nile to Palestine," Arabs dubbed Allenby "Allah an-nabi, a prophet of God." Allenby moved the EEF's GHQ from the Egyptian capital city to Rafah, nearer to the front lines at Gaza, and re-organized the disparate forces of the EEF into a three primary corps order of battle: XX, XXI, and the Desert Mounted Corps. He also approved the use of Arabic irregular forces which were operating at that time to the Turkish Army's open left flank in the Arabian interior, under the direction of a young British Army intelligence officer named T. E. Lawrence. He sanctioned £200,000 a month for Lawrence to facilitate his work amongst the tribes involved.

In early October 1917, Robertson asked Allenby to state his extra troop requirements to advance from the Gaza–Beersheba line (30 miles or 50 kilometres wide) to the Jaffa–Jerusalem line (50 miles or 80 kilometres wide), urging him to take no chances in estimating the threat of a German-reinforced threat. Allenby's estimate was that he would need 13 extra divisions (an impossible demand even if Haig's forces went on the defensive on the Western Front) and that he might face 18 Turkish and 2 German divisions. Yet, in private letters, Allenby and Robertson agreed that sufficient British Empire troops were already in place to take and hold Jerusalem.

Having reorganised his regular forces, Allenby won the Third Battle of Gaza (31 October – 7 November 1917) by surprising the defenders with an attack at Beersheba. The first step in capturing Beersheba was to send out false radio messages prompting the Turkish forces to think Britain was going to attack Gaza. After that, an intelligence officer, by the name of Colonel Richard Meinertzhagen, rode right up to the Turkish line, barely evading capture. In the fray, he dropped a bloodstained bag, smeared with horse blood, with fake military plans in it. The plans falsely described how the British force was on its way to capture Gaza. Instead, they went through with the capture of Beersheba. Allenby reported

The Turks at Beersheba were undoubtedly taken completely by surprise, a surprise from which the dash of London troops and Yeomanry, finely supported by their artillery, never gave them time to recover. The charge of the Australian Light Horse completed their defeat.

—

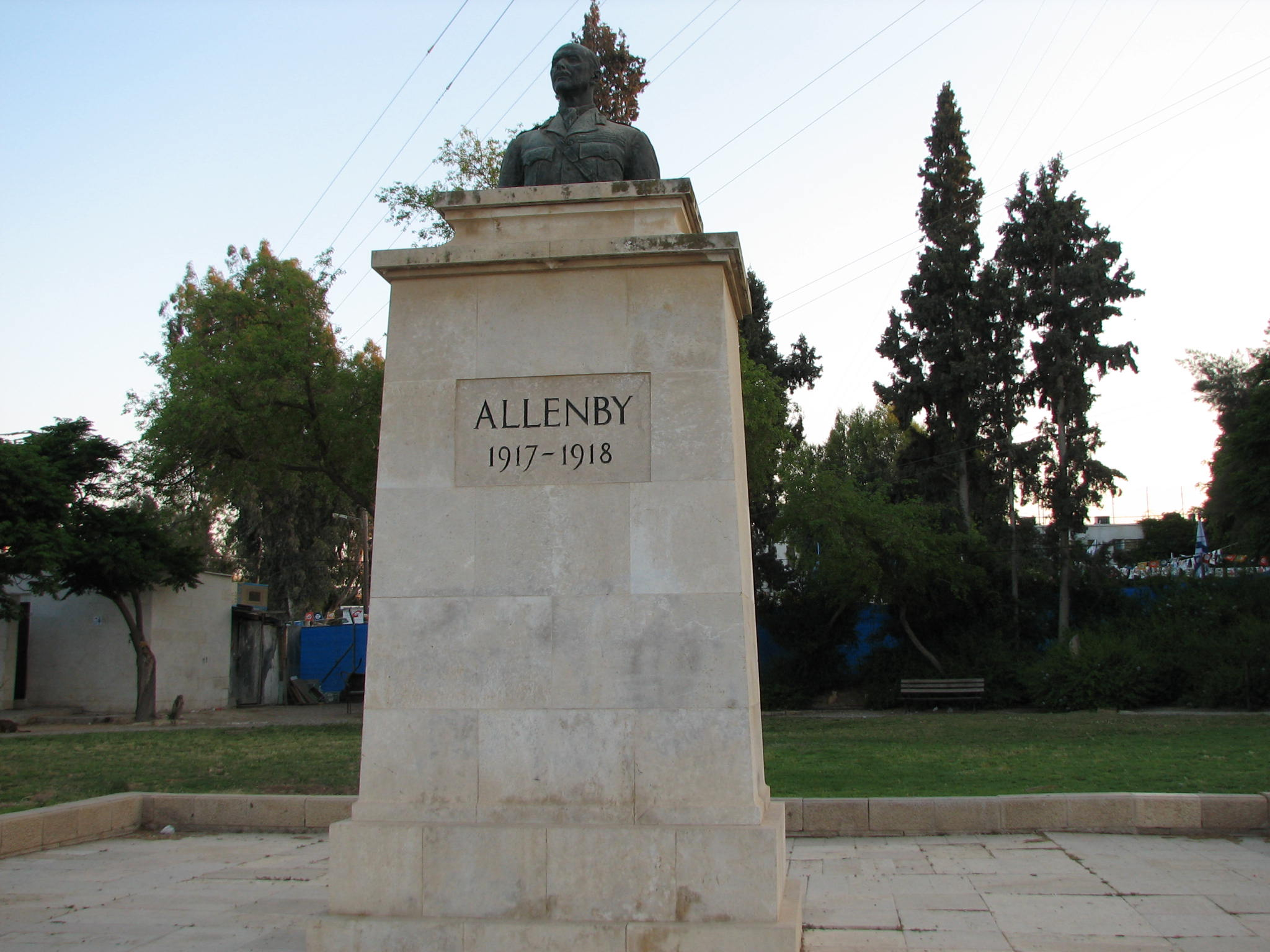
A Memorial to General Allenby in Beer Sheva.

His force captured the water supply there, and was able to push onward through the desert. His force pushed northwards towards Jerusalem. "Favoured by a continuance of fine weather, preparation for a fresh advance against the Turkish positions... of Jerusalem proceeded rapidly" – Allenby The Ottomans were beaten at Junction Station (10–14 November), and retreated from Jerusalem, which was captured on 9 December 1917. During the Palestine campaign, Allenby entered a bacteriological laboratory near Ludd, where he saw some charts on the wall. When he asked about their meanings, he was told that they were of the seasonal incidence of malignant malaria in the Plain of Sharon, then he replied:

I think it is the reason why Richard Coeur de Lion never got to Jerusalem. His army was nearly destroyed by fever, and I find that he came down the coast in September when malignant malaria was at its height.

—

==== The capture of Jerusalem ====
Allenby's official proclamation of martial law following the fall of Jerusalem on 9 December 1917 read as follows:

To the Inhabitants of Jerusalem the Blessed and the People Dwelling in Its Vicinity:
The defeat inflicted upon the Turks by the troops under my command has resulted in the occupation of your city by my forces. I, therefore, here now proclaim it to be under martial law, under which form of administration it will remain so long as military considerations make necessary.
However, lest any of you be alarmed by reason of your experience at the hands of the enemy who has retired, I hereby inform you that it is my desire that every person pursue his lawful business without fear of interruption.
Furthermore, since your city is regarded with affection by the adherents of three of the great religions of mankind and its soil has been consecrated by the prayers and pilgrimages of multitudes of devout people of these three religions for many centuries, therefore, do I make it known to you that every sacred building, monument, holy spot, shrine, traditional site, endowment, pious bequest, or customary place of prayer of whatsoever form of the three religions will be maintained and protected according to the existing customs and beliefs of those to whose faith they are sacred.
Guardians have been established at Bethlehem and on Rachel's Tomb. The tomb at Hebron has been placed under exclusive Moslem control.
The hereditary custodians at the gates of the Holy Sepulchre have been requested to take up their accustomed duties in remembrance of the magnanimous act of the Caliph Omar, who protected that church.

Allenby received Christian, Jewish and Muslim community leaders in Jerusalem and worked with them to ensure that religious sites of all three faiths were respected. Allenby sent his Indian Muslim soldiers to guard Islamic religious sites, feeling that this was the best way of reaching out to the Muslim population of Jerusalem.

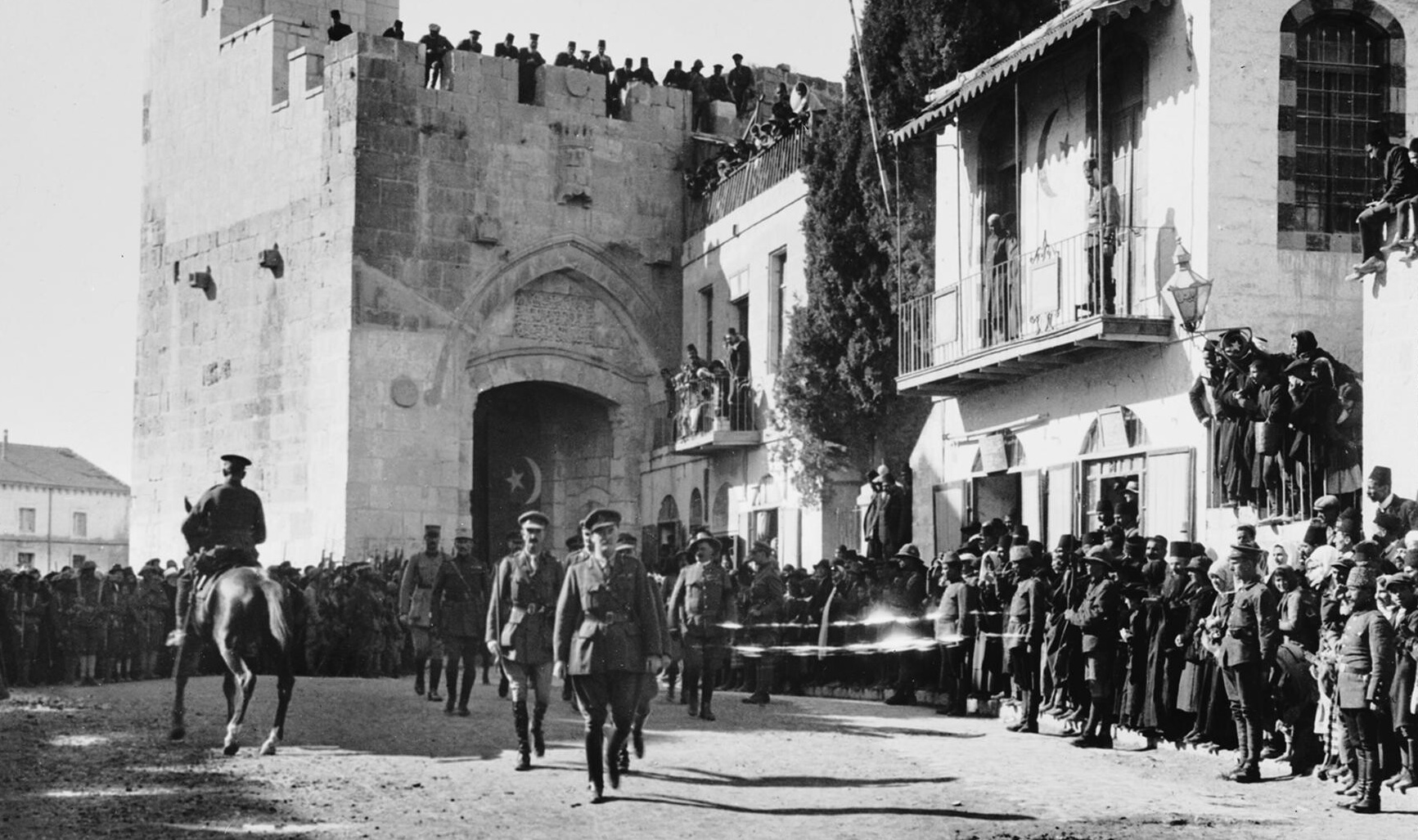
The victorious Allenby dismounted, enters Jerusalem on foot out of respect for the Holy City, 11 December 1917

Allenby dismounted and entered the city on foot through the Jaffa Gate, together with his officers, in deliberate contrast to the perceived arrogance of the Kaiser's entry into Jerusalem on horseback in 1898, which had not been well received by the local citizens. He did this out of respect for the status of Jerusalem as the Holy City important to Judaism, Christianity, and Islam (see his proclamation of martial law above). The people of Jerusalem saw Allenby's entrance on foot as a sign of his modesty. He subsequently stated in his official report:

...I entered the city officially at noon, 11 December, with a few of my staff, the commanders of the French and Italian detachments, the heads of the political missions, and the Military Attaches of France, Italy, and America... The procession was all afoot, and at Jaffa gate I was received by the guards representing England, Scotland, Ireland, Wales, Australia, New Zealand, India, France and Italy. The population received me well..."

"[The citizens of Jerusalem were] at first welcoming because they were glad the Ottomans were gone and they wanted a good relationship with the British. [They were] also cautious as they did not want the British to stay."

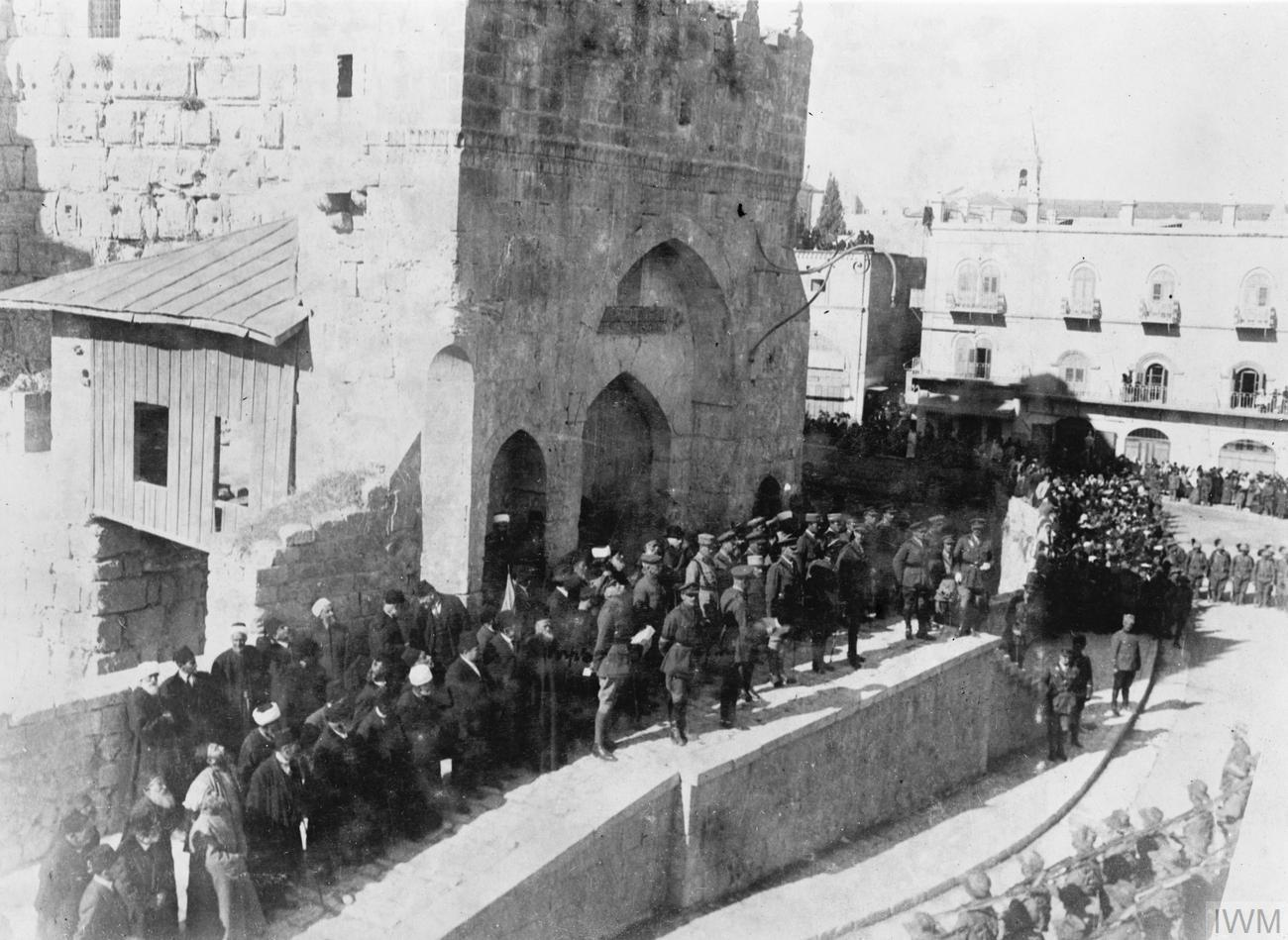
Official entry to Jerusalem, 11 December 1917. General Allenby at the steps of the Citadel (entrance to David's Tower) listening to the reading of the Proclamation of Occupation in seven languages.

The British press printed cartoons of Richard Coeur de Lion – who had himself failed to capture Jerusalem – looking down on the city from the heavens with the caption reading, "The last Crusade. My dream comes true!" The crusade imagery was used to describe the campaign by the British press and later by the British Ministry of Information. There were reports that on entering the city Allenby had remarked "only now have the crusades ended." However, mindful of the Pan-Islamic propaganda of the Ottomans who had proclaimed a jihad against the Allies in 1914, Allenby himself discouraged the use of the crusader imagery, banned his press officers from using the terms crusade and crusader in their press releases and always went out of his way to insist that he was fighting merely the Ottoman Empire, not Islam. Allenby stated that "The importance of Jerusalem lay in its strategic importance, there was no religious impulse in this campaign".

In May 1918, Allenby publicly met with Chaim Weizmann and the Chief Rabbi of Jerusalem in Jerusalem.

Jerusalem, May 1918, five months after the occupation of Jerusalem by British forces.

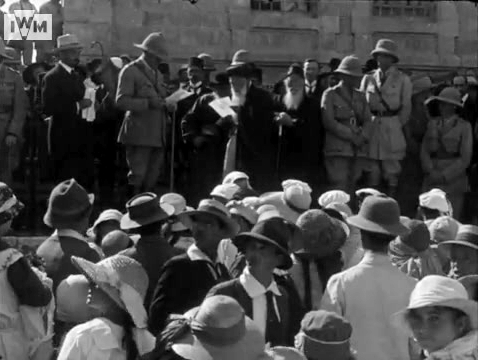
From left to right (holding papers): Weizmann, Allenby and the Chief Rabbi of Jerusalem delivering a speech.

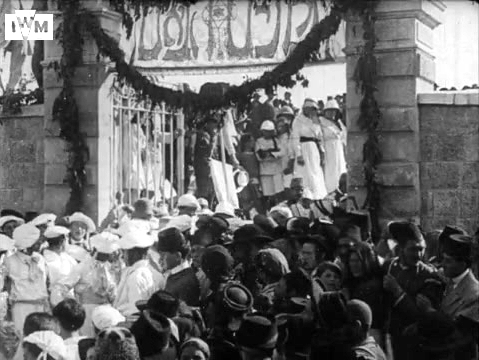
People gathered for the meeting and speeches of Allenby, Weizmann and the Chief Rabbi of Jerusalem.

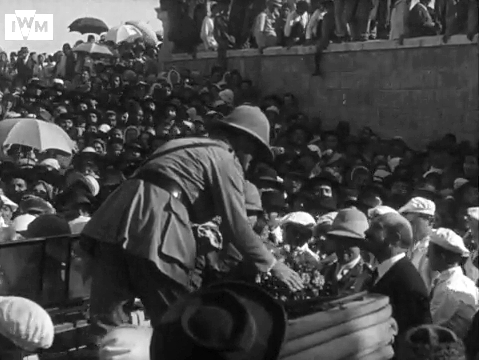
Allenby shaking hands with Weizmann after the delivery of the speeches.

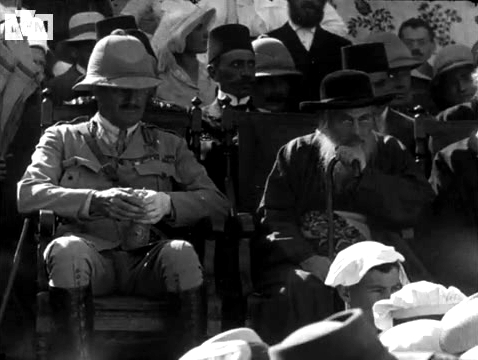
General Allenby sitting down after delivering his speech.

==== Defeat of the Ottoman Empire ====
Asked again after the Fall of Jerusalem, Allenby wrote that he could complete the conquest of Palestine with his existing forces, but would need 16–18 divisions, on top of the 8–10 he already had, for a further advance of 250 miles (400 km) to the Damascus–Beirut Line and then to Aleppo to cut Turkish communications to Mesopotamia (where by early 1918, 50,000 Turks were tying down a British Empire ration strength of over 400,000, of whom almost half were non-combatants, and 117,471 were British troops).

Smuts was sent to Egypt to confer with Allenby and Lieutenant General Sir William Marshall (C-in-C Mesopotamia), with Robertson's clash with the government now moving to its final stages, and the new Supreme War Council at Versailles drawing up plans for more efforts in the Middle East. Allenby told Smuts of Robertson's private instructions (sent by hand of Walter Kirke, appointed by Robertson as Smuts' adviser) that there was no merit in any further advance. Allenby worked with Smuts to draw up plans to reach Haifa by June and Damascus by the autumn, reinforced by 3 divisions from Mesopotamia. The speed of the advance was limited by the need to lay fresh rail track. This met with War Cabinet approval (6 March 1918).

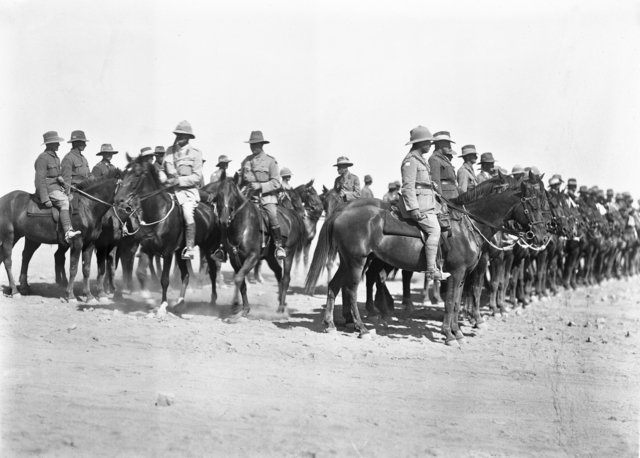
General Sir Edmund Allenby, C-in-C of the EEF, inspects officers and men of the ANZAC Mounted Division, to whom he was about to present decorations, Palestine, August 1918.

The German spring offensive on the Western Front meant that Allenby was without reinforcements after his forces failed to capture Amman in March and April 1918. He halted the offensive in the spring of 1918 and had to send 60,000 men to the Western Front, although the Dominion prime ministers in the Imperial War Cabinet continued to demand a strong commitment to the Middle East in case Germany could not be beaten.

New troops from the British Empire (specifically Australia, New Zealand, India, and South Africa) led to the resumption of operations in August 1918. Following an extended series of deceptive moves, the Ottoman line was broken at the Battle of Megiddo (19–21 September 1918), and the Allied cavalry passed through and blocked the Turkish retreat. The EEF then advanced at an impressive rate, as high as 60 miles (97 km) in 55 hours for cavalry, and infantry slogging 20 miles (32 km) a day and encountering minimal resistance. Damascus fell on 1 October, Homs on 16 October, and Aleppo on 25 October. With the threat of Asia Minor being invaded, the Ottoman Empire capitulated on 30 October 1918 with the signing of the Armistice of Mudros.

== Governor of Egypt ==
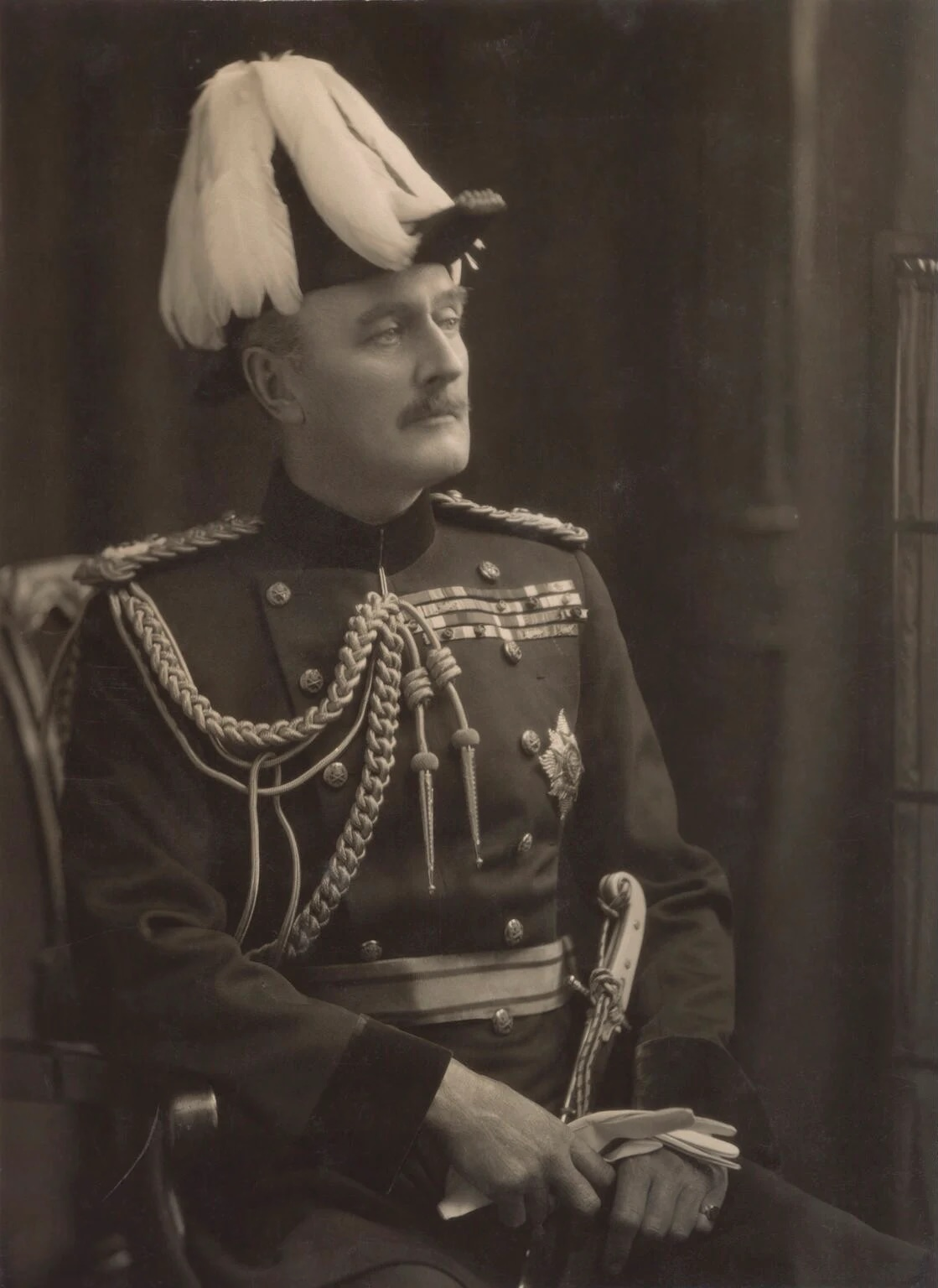
Edmund Allenby, 1st Viscount Allenby (1861–1936), British Field Marshal by Henry Walter Barnett

Allenby was made a field marshal on 31 July 1919, and created Viscount Allenby, of Megiddo and of Felixstowe in the County of Suffolk, on 7 October.

His appointment in 1919 as Special High Commissioner of Egypt came as the country was being disrupted by demonstrations against British rule. It had been under Martial Law since 1914 and several Egyptian leaders, including Saad Zaghlul, had been exiled to Malta.

These deportations had led to rioting across the country, with Cairo isolated. Allenby's first response was conciliatory. He persuaded the Colonial Office to allow Zaghlul and his delegation, from the Wafd, to travel to France. Their intention was to present the Egyptian case to the Paris Peace Conference but they received no official recognition and returned to Egypt in failure.

As a general, Allenby played a prominent role in helping Britain counter the 1919 Egyptian revolution. However, as High Commissioner of Egypt, Allenby favored negotiations with Egypt. Soon after the 1919 uprising, the Milner Mission was initiated.

In early 1921 there were more riots and demonstrations that were blamed on Zaghlul. This time Allenby ordered that Zaghlul and five other leaders be deported to the Seychelles. Sixteen rioters were executed. The following year Allenby travelled to London with proposals which he insisted be implemented. They included the end of Martial Law, the drafting of an Egyptian Constitution and the return of Zaghlul. Progress was made: Egypt was granted limited self-government, and a draft constitution was published in October 1922 leading to the formation of a Zaghlul government in January 1924. The following November the Sirdar of the Egyptian Army, Sir Lee Stack, was assassinated in Cairo. Allenby's response was draconian and included a humiliating £500,000 fine to be paid by the Egyptian government. In May 1925, Allenby resigned and returned to England.

=== Legacy in Egypt ===
Allenby was a hated figure in Egypt. In Port Said, people burning effigies of Allenby became a Spring festival tradition. The practice started after the First World War, when demonstrators burned an effigy of him during a protest against the presence of British troops in the city. When Allenby left Egypt, the people of Port Said burned a large effigy of him dressed in a military uniform.

== Retirement ==
Allenby was appointed Honorary Colonel of the Cinque Ports Fortress Royal Engineers on 12 September 1925 and made Captain of Deal Castle.

Murray and Allenby were invited to give lectures at Aldershot in 1931 about the Palestine campaign. Exchanging letters beforehand, Murray asked whether it had been worth risking the Western Front (in the autumn of 1917) to transfer troops to Palestine. Allenby avoided that question, but commented that in 1917 and into the spring of 1918 it had been far from clear that the Allies were going to win the war. The Armistice between Russia and the Central Powers of December 1917 had effectively taken Russia out of the war, but the Americans, who had entered the war in April 1917, were not yet present in strength. France and Italy were weakened and might have been persuaded to make peace, perhaps by Germany giving up Belgium or Alsace-Lorraine, or Austria-Hungary giving up the Trentino. In those circumstances, the Central Powers were likely to be left in control of Eastern Europe and the Balkans, and it had been sensible for Britain to grab some land in the Middle East to block Germany's route to India. Allenby's views mirrored those of the War Cabinet at the time.

Allenby went to Patagonia for a last fishing trip, aged 74, to see if the salmon really were as large as those in the River Tay.

In 1917 while serving in Egypt, Allenby formed a life-long friendship with Lieutenant Colonel Sir Herbert Lightfoot Eason, with Eason later describing Allenby as the greatest man he ever met in his long life of many distinguished contacts.

== Death ==
He died suddenly from a ruptured cerebral aneurysm on 14 May 1936 at his house in Kensington, London, at the age of 75 years. His body was cremated, and his ashes were buried in Westminster Abbey.

== Family ==
In 1897, Allenby married Miss Adelaide Chapman (d. 1942), the daughter of a Wiltshire landowner. Their only child, Lieutenant Horace Michael Hynman Allenby, MC (1898–1917), was killed in action at Koksijde in Flanders whilst serving with the Royal Horse Artillery. The personal inscription on his gravestone reads: "HOW SHALL I DECK MY SONG FOR THE LARGE SWEET SOUL THAT HAS GONE AND WHAT SHALL MY PERFUME BE FOR THE GRAVE OF HIM I LOVE". This is a quotation from "When Lilacs Last in the Dooryard Bloom'd" by American poet Walt Whitman.

On Allenby's death, leaving no direct issue, his peerage and seat in the House of Lords passed by a special remainder to his nephew Dudley Allenby, son of Captain Frederick Allenby, who became the 2nd Viscount.

== Tributes ==
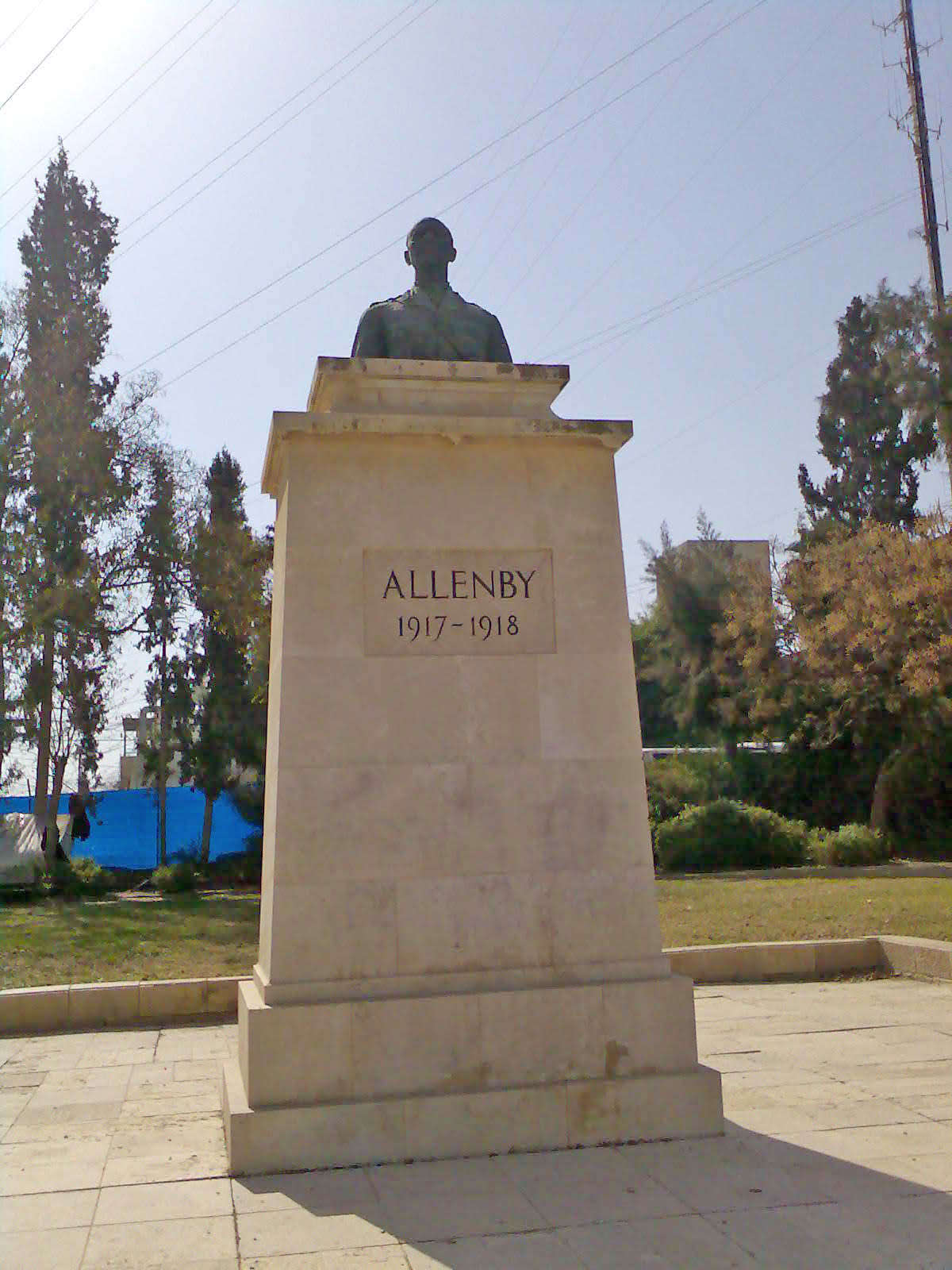
Allenby's Monument in Beersheba

Allenby supposedly once said that people would have to visit a war museum to learn of him, but that T. E. Lawrence would be remembered and become a household name. This was quoted by Robert Bolt in his screenplay for the 1962 film Lawrence of Arabia, directed by David Lean. A blue plaque unveiled in 1960 commemorates Allenby at 24 Wetherby Gardens, South Kensington, London.

Publicity surrounding Allenby's exploits in the Middle East was at its highest in Britain in the immediate aftermath of the First World War. Allenby enjoyed a period of celebrity in the United States, as well. He and his wife went on an American tour in 1928, receiving a standing ovation when he addressed Carnegie Hall in New York City. Biographer Raymond Savage claimed that, for a time, Allenby was better known in America than Lawrence.

Allenby was the subject of a 1923 documentary film by British Instructional Films entitled Armageddon, detailing his military leadership during World War I. However, the film is believed lost.

The epic film Lawrence of Arabia depicts the Arab Revolt during World War I. Allenby is given a major part in it and is portrayed by Jack Hawkins in one of his best-known roles. Screenwriter Bolt called Allenby a "very considerable man" and hoped to depict him sympathetically. Nonetheless, many view Allenby's portrayal as negative.

The efforts of T. E. Lawrence ("Lawrence of Arabia") were greatly aided by Allenby in the Arab Revolt, and he thought highly of Allenby: "(He was) physically large and confident, and morally so great that the comprehension of our littleness came slow to him".

Into the 1990s, residents of Ismaïlia in north-eastern Egypt burned effigies to mark an annual spring holiday, including one of Allenby more than 70 years after he led forces in the Sinai.

The British journalist Mark Urban has argued that Allenby is one of the most important British generals who ever lived, writing that Allenby's use of air power, mechanised forces and irregulars led by Lawrence marked one of the first attempts at a new type of war while at the same time he had to act as a politician holding together a force comprising men from many nations, making him "the first of the modern supreme commanders". Urban further argued during the war, the British government had made all sorts of plans for the Middle East such as the Sykes–Picot Agreement in 1916 and the Balfour Declaration of 1917, but as long as the Ottoman Empire continued to hold much of the Near East, these plans meant nothing. By defeating the Ottomans in 1917–18, Allenby, if he did not create the modern Middle East, at the very least made the creation of the modern Middle East possible. If the Ottoman Empire had continued in its pre-war frontiers after the war—and before Allenby arrived in Egypt the British had not advanced very far—then it is probable that the nations of Israel, Jordan, Syria, Lebanon and Iraq would not exist today.

== Honours ==
Ribbon bar (as it would look today):

=== British ===
- Knight Grand Cross of the Order of the Bath, Military Division (GCB) – 5 November 1918 (KCB: 18 February 1915; CB: 26 June 1902)
- Knight Grand Cross of the Order of St. Michael and St. George (GCMG) – 17 December 1917
- Viscount Allenby of Megiddo and of Felixstowe in the County of Suffolk – 18 October 1919
- Knight of Justice of the Venerable Order of St. John – 19 June 1925 (Knight of Grace: 21 December 1917)
- Knight Grand Cross of the Royal Victorian Order (GCVO) – 4 June 1934

==== Campaign and commemorative medals ====
- Queen's South Africa Medal
- King's South Africa Medal
- 1914 Star and bar
- British War Medal
- Victory Medal, with mention in despatches oak spray
- King George V Coronation Medal
- King George V Silver Jubilee Medal

=== Others ===
- Grand Officer of the Legion of Honour of France – 18 March 1915
- Belgian Croix de Guerre – 11 March 1918
- Grand Cross of the Order of the White Eagle with Swords of the Kingdom of Serbia – 10 September 1918
- Grand Cross of the Order of the Redeemer of the Kingdom of Greece – 10 October 1918
- Croix de Guerre of France – 11 March 1919
- Army Distinguished Service Medal of the United States – 12 July 1919
- Grand Officer of the Military Order of Savoy of the Kingdom of Italy – 21 August 1919
- Grand Cross of the Order of the Crown of Romania of the Kingdom of Romania – 20 September 1919
- Order of Wen-Hu, 1st Class of the Republic of China – 17 February 1920
- Supreme Order of the Renaissance, 1st Class with Brilliants of the Kingdom of Hejaz – 5 March 1920
- Order of Michael the Brave, 1st Class of the Kingdom of Romania – 7 May 1920
- Grand Cordon of the Order of the Rising Sun of the Empire of Japan – 21 January 1921
- Grand Cordon of the Order of the Paulownia Flowers of the Empire of Japan – 20 January 1922
- Grand Cross (Mil.) of the Order of Leopold of the Kingdom of Belgium – 23 March 1935 (Grand Officer: 26 July 1917)

=== Arms ===
Coat of arms of Edmund Allenby, 1st Viscount Allenby
Crest Issuant out of a crescent Gules a demi-lion Proper. Escutcheon Per bend Argent and Gules in the sinister three crescents two and one of the second and in the dexter three horses' heads erased one and two of the first all within a bordure Azure. Supporters Dexter a horse reguardant Or sinister a camel reguardant Argent. Motto Fide Et Labore

== See also ==
- Allenby Bridge
- Allenby Gardens, South Australia
- Allenby Square, Jerusalem
- Allenby Street, Tel Aviv
- Allenby, British Columbia
- Allenby, Toronto
- Army Manoeuvres of 1912
- Mandatory Palestine
- Victory Services Club

== Sources ==
- Aitken, Ian (2007). Encyclopedia of the Documentary Film. Taylor & Francis Group. ISBN 978-1579584450.
- Beckett, Ian F. W.; Corvi, Steven J. (2006). Haig's Generals. Barnsley: Pen & Sword Military. ISBN 978-1-84415-169-1.
- Gardner, Brian (1965). Allenby. London: Cassell. OCLC 2287641.
- Farrar-Hockley, General Sir Anthony (1975). Goughie. London: Granada. ISBN -0246640596.
- Heathcote, Tony (1999). The British Field Marshals 1736–1997. Barnsley (UK): Pen & Sword. ISBN 0-85052-696-5.
- Hughes, Matthew (1999). Allenby and British Strategy in the Middle East 1917–1919. Routledge. ISBN 978-0714644738.
- James, Lawrence (1993). Imperial Warrior. The Life and Times of Field Marshal Viscount Allenby 1861–1936. London: Weidenfeld & Nicolson. ISBN 978-0297811527.
- Reid, Walter (2006). Architect of Victory: Douglas Haig. Birlinn, Edinburgh. ISBN 1-84158-517-3.
- Urban, Mark (2005). Generals: Ten British Commanders Who Shaped The Modern World. London: Faber and Faber. ISBN 978-0571224876.
- Woodward, David R. (1998). Field Marshal Sir William Robertson. Westport Connecticut & London: Praeger. ISBN 0-275-95422-6.

Military offices
New title British mobilization	GOC 1st Cavalry Division; August – October 1914	Succeeded by H. de B. de Lisle
Preceded by Herbert Plumer	GOC V Corps; May–October 1915	Succeeded by Hew Fanshawe
New post	Commander of the British Third Army; October 1915 – June 1917	Succeeded by Sir Julian Byng
Preceded by Sir Archibald Murray	GOC British Troops in Egypt and the Egyptian Expeditionary Force; 1917–1919	Succeeded by Sir Walter Congreve
Honorary titles
Preceded by The Lord Grenfell	Colonel of the 1st Life Guards; 1920–1922	amalgamated to form The Life Guards
Preceded by Sir Henry Jenner Scobell	Colonel of the 5th Royal Irish Lancers; 1912–1922	amalgamated to form 16th/5th Lancers
New regiment	Colonel of the 16th/5th Lancers; 1922–1936	Succeeded by Sir Hubert de la Poer Gough
Political offices
New office	Chief Administrator of Palestine; 1917–1918	Succeeded by Sir Arthur Wigram Money
Preceded by Sir Reginald Wingate	British High Commissioner in Egypt; 1919–1925	Succeeded by Sir George Lloyd
Academic offices
Preceded by Ian Standish Monteith Hamilton	Rector of the University of Edinburgh; 1935–1936	Succeeded by Herbert John Clifford Grierson
Peerage of the United Kingdom
New creation	Viscount Allenby; 1919–1936	Succeeded by Dudley Allenby
