= Sir William Russell, 1st Baronet =

Sir William Russell, 1st Baronet may refer to:

- Sir William Russell, 1st Baronet, of Chippenham (died 1654), English politician
- Sir William Russell, 1st Baronet, of Wytley (c. 1602–1669), English politician
- Sir William Russell, 1st Baronet, of Charlton Park (1773–1839), Scottish physician

== See also ==
- William Russell (disambiguation)
- Sir William Russell, 2nd Baronet
