= Columbia University Bicentennial =

Series of celebrations for the anniversary of the founding of Columbia University

Coordinates: 40°48′27″N 73°57′43″W

- Queen Elizabeth the Queen Mother attending the university's bicentennial Charter Day Dinner, October 30, 1954
- Date: January 4 – October 31, 1954
- Duration: 9 months and 27 days
- Venue: Columbia University
- Location: New York City, New York

The Columbia University Bicentennial was a series of celebrations in 1954 commemorating the 200th anniversary of the founding of Columbia University. Its scale was global, with participation from over 750 domestic and 350 foreign universities, libraries, and museums. In New York City, bicentennial events centered around three convocations in January, June, and October, interspersed with conferences, concerts, and other ceremonies. In order to spread the theme of the Bicentennial, "Man's Right to Knowledge and the Free Use Thereof", across the United States, the university created several network television and radio shows, including the Peabody Award-winning series Man's Right to Knowledge. The celebrations received heavy media coverage, both in the United States and abroad.

Held several miles away from the United Nations Headquarters in Midtown Manhattan, the Bicentennial and its conferences served as important global forums on government, economics, and international affairs, with participation from numerous heads of state, Nobel Prize laureates, and foreign academic officials. With cooperation from the United States Department of State, it played a role in the development of transatlantic relations during the Cold War, while the attendance of two Soviet academics, Andrey Kursanov and Boris Rybakov, signaled the beginning of an opening-up of academic relations with the Soviet Union under Nikita Khrushchev.

Notable dignitaries who attended the celebrations in New York included President Dwight D. Eisenhower, Emperor Haile Selassie of Ethiopia, Queen Elizabeth the Queen Mother, First Lady Eleanor Roosevelt, Secretary-General of the United Nations Dag Hammarskjöld, Belgian Prime Minister Paul-Henri Spaak, Chancellor of West Germany Konrad Adenauer, Vice President of India Sarvepalli Radhakrishnan, President of Ecuador Galo Plaza, President of Colombia Eduardo Santos, President of Costa Rica Otilio Ulate Blanco, President of Chile Carlos Dávila, and President of Panama Ricardo J. Alfaro. Participants also included cabinet members, ambassadors and United Nations delegates, university presidents, and notable academics.

== Preparations ==
=== Planning and promotion ===
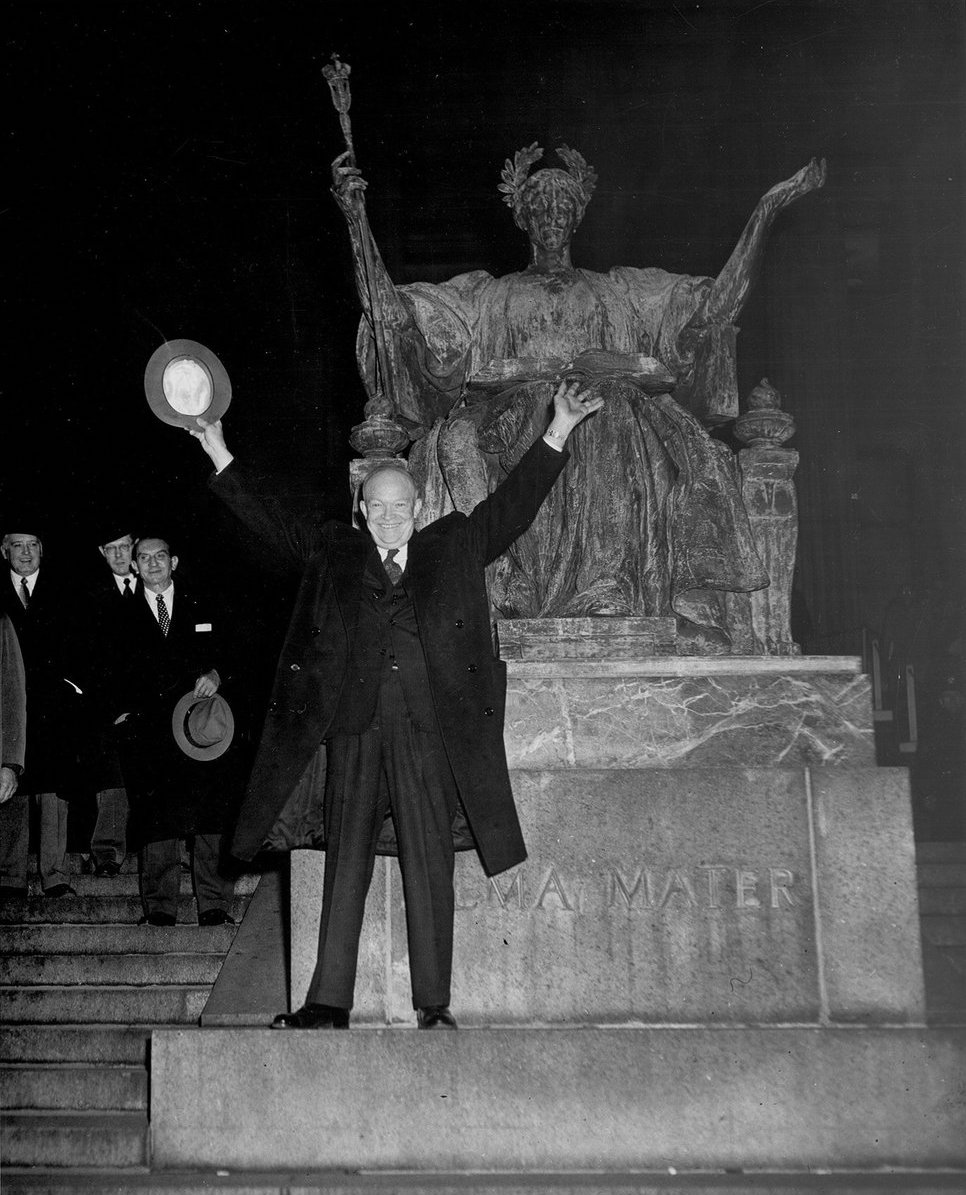
Dwight D. Eisenhower posing before Alma Mater on January 16, 1953, three days before his resignation as president of Columbia University, and four days before his inauguration as president of the United States

Planning for the Bicentennial began in 1946, following the bicentennials of Princeton University and the University of Pennsylvania, and the tercentenary of Harvard University. The theme of the celebrations, "Man's Right to Knowledge and the Free Use Thereof", was originally proposed by alumnus and The New York Times publisher Arthur Hays Sulzberger. In the wake of World War II, the committee of faculty and students charged with planning the celebrations decided to give it a more reflective tone, with a year of scholarly events that would involve institutions worldwide. Special emphasis was placed on using radio and television to spread the message of the Bicentennial.

Dwight D. Eisenhower became the president of the university in 1948, and did not alter the original plan upon his accession, appointing Sulzberger as the chair of the Bicentennial Central Committee. On May 15, 1950, he sent letters to 750 institutions of learning, including universities, libraries, and museums, in 58 countries, inviting them to participate in the celebrations. Notably, this included several institutions in the Eastern Bloc, including Moscow State University, Leningrad State University, Odessa State University, the Russian State Museum, the Lenin State Library, and the State Historical Museum in the Soviet Union, and several others in Czechoslovakia, Poland, and Hungary.

Provost Grayson L. Kirk became acting president of the university when Eisenhower took leave to serve as the Supreme Allied Commander Europe of NATO in 1951, and would later become president in 1953 upon Eisenhower's resignation. In order to promote the Bicentennial abroad, he embarked on a three-week tour of Western Europe in December 1952, visiting London, Paris, The Hague, Berlin, Bonn, and Rome. The trip was organized in cooperation with the United States Department of State, which viewed the Bicentennial as a foreign relations opportunity, and invited Kirk to embassy dinners as a guest of honor, where he would address cultural leaders in each of the countries he visited. On the day after each dinner, he held meetings with representatives from regional institutions to help plan their participation in the celebration. Kirk was received well in Europe, where the Bicentennial theme was met with "great sympathy and responsiveness." At a luncheon with officials and students at the International Institute of Social Studies in The Hague, Dutch sociologist Sjoerd Hofstra reportedly told Kirk that "Columbia's bicentennial project is extremely important. Everything done in your country has great repercussions in the rest of the world and you have made a happy choice of a them for your celebration." On his return, Kirk reported a "sense of urgency" in Europe towards American foreign policy and called for increased cultural collaboration between the United States and the rest of the world. During his trip, 232 institutions agreed to participate in the celebrations. In March 1953, he addressed delegates from 55 different countries at a United Nations luncheon, asking them to inform their governments of the Columbia bicentennial and its theme.

=== Government participation ===
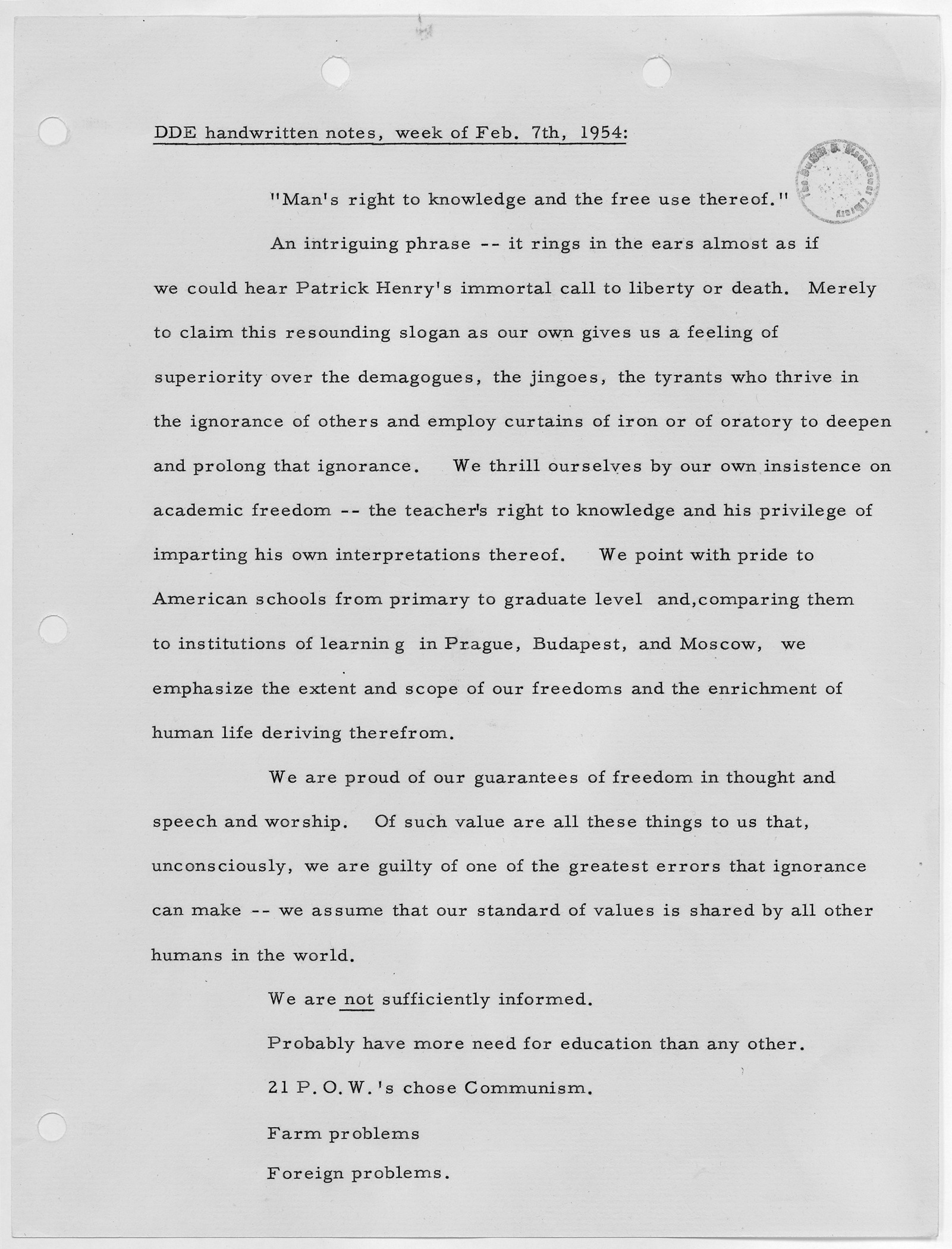
Typed copy of handwritten notes by President Eisenhower on the bicentennial theme, February 7, 1954

The preparations for the Bicentennial also involved the United States government at the city, state, and federal levels. As part of the university's beautification plans, in August 1953, the Government of New York City ceded to it the portion of West 116th Street between Broadway and Amsterdam Avenue that bisected its campus in exchange for a token payment of $1,000, unifying the campus. Meanwhile, the Government of the State of New York and the U.S. federal government both created committees to congratulate the university and represent themselves at the celebrations. Each committee was composed of representatives from each branch of government. The New York legislative committee was created in February 1953, and consisted of nine members. Governor Thomas E. Dewey, himself an alumnus of Columbia Law School, appointed Chairman of the State Crime Commission Joseph M. Proskauer to lead the commission, in addition to District Attorney Frank Hogan and Elliott V. Bell, the chairman of the executive committee of The McGraw-Hill Publishing Company, while Senate Majority Leader Walter J. Mahoney and Speaker of the New York State Assembly Oswald D. Heck each appointed three members of their respective legislative houses. With the exception of Assemblywoman Maude E. Ten Eyck, all members of the committee were Columbia alumni.

The United States Commission for the Bicentennial of Columbia University in the City of New York was created by a joint resolution of Congress in August 1953. Eisenhower, as president of the United States, served as honorary chair, and appointed four of the commission's fifteen members. Vice President Richard Nixon, as President of the Senate, and Speaker of the House Joseph W. Martin Jr. also sat on the committee, and each appointed four other members from the Senate and House of Representatives. In the text of the resolution, the commission was tasked with "extend[ing] appropriate greetings and courtesies to representatives of foreign governments, to the delegates of foreign universities and other foreign learned bodies, and to foreign scholars and other individuals attending the celebrations as guests of Columbia University."

== Events ==
The year-long bicentennial celebrations centered around three convocations at the university in January, June, and October 1954, which each focused on Columbia's relationship with New York City, the United States, and the world, respectively. Each convocation was accompanied with two academic conferences. The celebrations in New York saw the participation of at least 104 foreign academic institutions, as well as several heads of state. Events also occurred in July, including a special convocation celebration public education held on July 1, and a celebration of the anniversary of the first class taught at the university at Trinity Church, where the university was founded in 1754.

=== January convocation ===
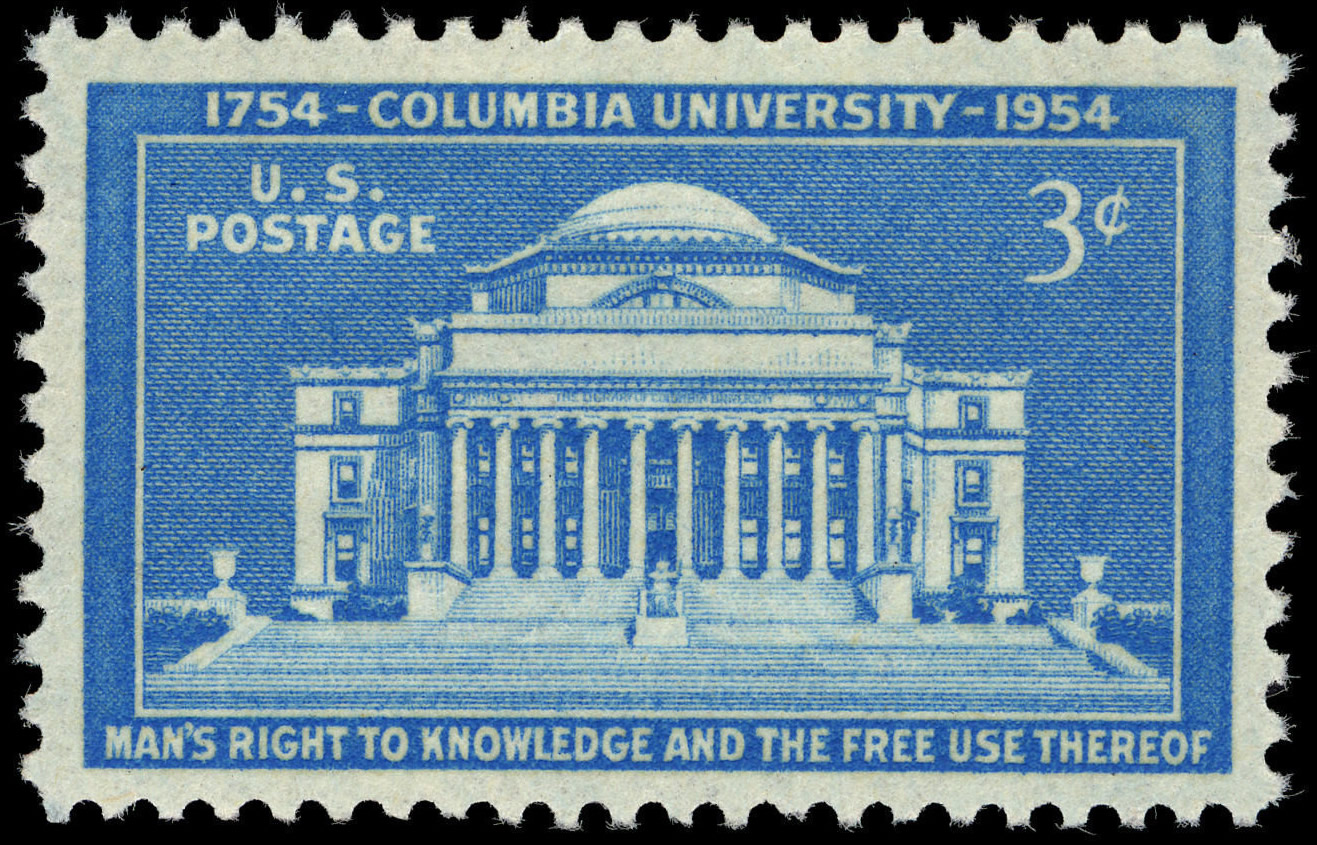
The Columbia University Bicentennial stamp, depicting Low Memorial Library

The Bicentennial officially began on January 4, 1954, with the first issuing of the commemorative 3-cent Columbia University Bicentennial stamp by the United States Postal Service. Columbia was the second university in the United States to receive postal tribute, after Washington and Lee University. The ceremony marking the beginning of the celebrations opened with a performance by the New York Post Office Band, and included speeches by Kirk, New York City Mayor Robert F. Wagner Jr., acting Postmaster of New York City John H. Sheehan, and Governor Dewey. Important members of the Columbia administration, in addition to Dewey and Wagner, received souvenir stamp albums from the assistant United States postmaster general, while additional albums were sent to President Eisenhower and Postmaster General Arthur Summerfield. At a separate ceremony in Newark, New Jersey, Governor-elect Robert B. Meyner was also presented with his own album. A special post office substation was set up in Low Memorial Library, where $50,000 worth of the stamp was sold on just the first day.

The pursuit of knowledge is a natural and innate human instinct. On its satisfaction hang the spiritual health and happiness of mankind; of its frustration come misery, hatred and oppression.
It is the duty and the privilege of the great institutions of learning in every land to offer this gift freely so that those who receive it may use it freely to the common good.
Among these institutions Columbia is preeminently fitted to discharge this proud duty. She nourishes scholars of every nation, who on going forth spread ever wider her long tradition of learning, liberty and peace.

— Winston Churchill, in the Columbia Daily Spectator

The first convocation of the year took place on January 11, the birthday of Alexander Hamilton, in Riverside Church. President Kirk and Professor Mark Van Doren spoke at the ceremony, where 44 honorary degrees were awarded to various leaders in education, science, public affairs, law, journalism, philanthropy, religion, music, and the arts. Theresa Helburn, co-founder and executive of the Theatre Guild, was the sole female recipient. Other individuals honored included composer Richard Rodgers and lyricist-dramatist Oscar Hammerstein II, Canadian Supreme Court Justice Ivan Rand, and Nobel laureate Archibald Hill.

On the day of the ceremony, the university received letters of congratulations from Secretary-General of the United Nations Dag Hammarskjöld and former British Prime Minister Winston Churchill. Their messages were published in the Columbia Daily Spectator.

The celebrations ended on January 14 with the annual Alexander Hamilton Award Dinner, held at the Waldorf Astoria. Chief Justice Earl Warren and Mayor Wagner spoke, and the award was presented to District Attorney Frank Hogan.

=== June convocation ===
Emperor Haile Selassie on Low steps

The second convocation was combined with the university's 1954 commencement exercises. A week of festivities began on May 31, the Columbia College Class Day. In the evening, President Eisenhower addressed some 1,800 alumni, faculty, and guests at the Waldorf Astoria. The convocation itself was held the next day in front of Low Library. At the ceremony, 6,400 graduating Columbia students received their diplomas, in addition to 33 honorary degree recipients. Among those honored were Secretary of State John Foster Dulles; Secretary of Health, Education, and Welfare Oveta Culp Hobby; and Chair of the United States Atomic Energy Commission Lewis Strauss. Additionally, four university presidents were given honorary degrees: Nathan Pusey of Harvard, Alfred Whitney Griswold of Yale, Lewis Webster Jones of Rutgers, and Henry Townley Heald of NYU.

On June 2, Emperor of Ethiopia Haile Selassie was awarded an honorary Doctor of Laws at a special, private ceremony in the Trustee Room of Low Library. A citation read by President Kirk praised his resistance against the Italian invasion of Ethiopia during World War II, as well as Ethiopia's involvement in the Korean War. In return, Selassie gifted the university a hand-written copy of the New Testament in Amharic. Two of his grandsons, Merid and Samson Beyene, attended Columbia at the time.

The week ended with a speech by former Governor of Illinois Adlai Stevenson II, whom Eisenhower had recently defeated in the 1952 United States presidential election.

=== July events ===
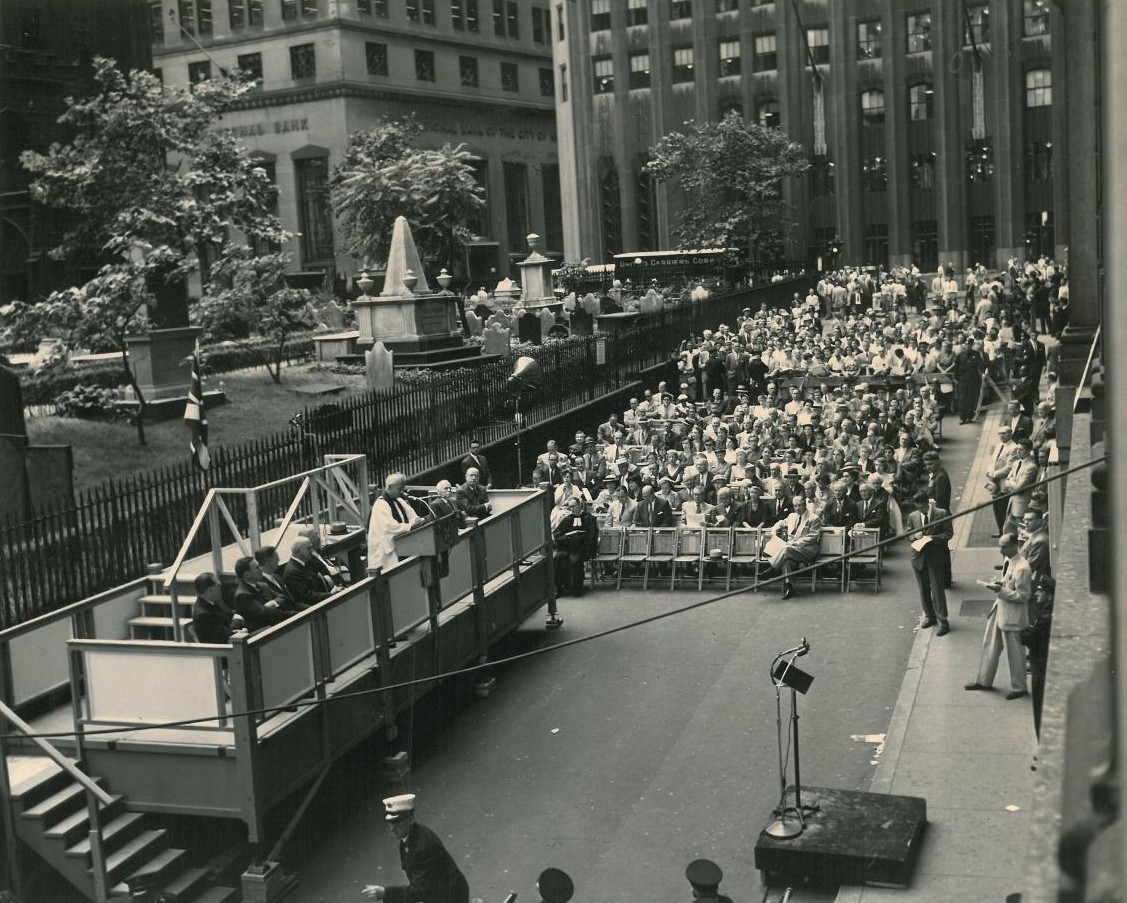
The ceremony in front of Trinity Church celebrating the first class taught at Columbia, July 16, 1954

A special convocation was held on July 1 in collaboration with Teachers College, in honor of public education. Teachers College President William Fletcher Russell spoke at the ceremony in Low Library, and 20 honorary degrees were conferred upon various educators.

A ceremony celebrating the Bicentennial of the college's first class, which occurred several months before Columbia was issued its charter, was held in front of Trinity Church on July 16. The actual date of the anniversary was on July 17, but the event was pushed forward one day to avoid holding it on a Saturday. The ceremony involved a reenactment of the school's opening: Dean Harry Carman, as Samuel Johnson, delivered an address based on Johnson's original June 3, 1754, advertisement for the school in The New-York Mercury, while fake newsboys hawked copies of the speech in the crowd. A fictional roll-call for the first class at Columbia, which had just eight students, was then held, with some of the students' descendants in the audience. After the reenactment, a plaque on the church's north wall commemorating the founding of the university was unveiled.

=== October convocation ===
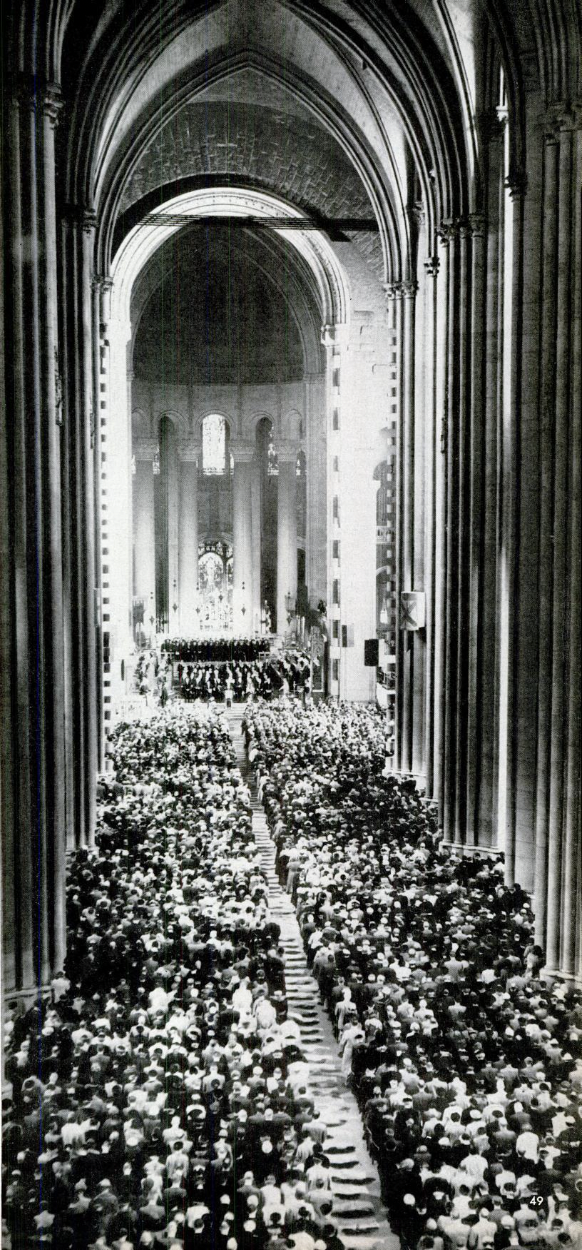
8,000 attend the Charter Day convocation in the Cathedral of St. John the Divine, October 31, 1954.

The third convocation took place on the university's annual Charter Day, October 31. It was preceded by a bicentennial concert, performed by the New York Philharmonic in Carnegie Hall on October 26, conducted by Leopold Stokowski. The pieces performed were composed by Columbia music professors and researchers, including Daniel Gregory Mason, Otto Luening, Douglas Moore (Symphony No. 2), Edward MacDowell (Piano Concerto No. 2), and Béla Bartók (Dance Suite). The soloist for MacDowell's Piano Concerto No. 2 was recent alumnus Gary Graffman.

The annual Charter Day Dinner was held on October 30 at the Waldorf Astoria, with Queen Elizabeth the Queen Mother as the event's guest of honor. The speakers at the dinner were Arthur Hays Sulzberger, U.S. Ambassador at Large Philip Jessup, French Director General of Higher Education Pierre Donzelot, Rector of the University of Bologna Felice Battaglia, Secretary General of the Organization of American States and future President of Colombia Alberto Lleras Camargo, Prime Minister of Belgium Paul-Henri Spaak, Chancellor of West Germany Konrad Adenauer, Vice President and eventual President of India Sarvepalli Radhakrishnan, the Queen Mother herself, Secretary-General Hammarskjöld, and finally President Kirk.

The convocation took place the next day, Charter Day proper, in the Cathedral of St. John the Divine. Over 8,000 individuals attended, including 105 representatives from 104 foreign universities, ranging from the University of Bologna, the oldest university in continuous operation, having been founded in 1088, to the University of Bihar, which was only founded in 1952. The procession of foreign academics was led by Kyriakos Varvaressos of the Academy of Athens.

Notably in attendance were two representatives from the Soviet Union: biochemist Andrey Kursanov and historian Boris Rybakov; their visit was to the United States was the first of its kind since the beginning of the Cold War. Earlier attempts to bring Soviet academics to the United States since the end of World War II had failed, including a 1946 attempt by Princeton to invite several Soviet scholars to their own bicentennial. Though their invitations had been sent by Eisenhower in 1950, they were only accepted several days before the convocation. During the ceremony, Kursanov and Rybakov refused to wear academic robes, and showed up in suits instead. The visit signaled the beginning of the Khrushchev Thaw following the death of Joseph Stalin in 1953: in 1955, Columbia repaid Kursanov and Rybakov's visit, sending two of their own professors to attend the bicentennial of Moscow State University, and by 1958 the two universities had established an exchange program, in parallel with another program between Harvard and Leningrad State University.

At the convocation, 48 honorary degrees were awarded. Recipients included Nobel laureates Bernardo Houssay, Niels Bohr, and Gabriela Mistral; college presidents Charles W. Cole of Amherst, John Sloan Dickey of Dartmouth, Victor L. Butterfield of Wesleyan, and James Phinney Baxter III of Williams; in addition to all the speakers at the Charter Day Dinner, Earl Warren, and Adlai Stevenson. When the Queen Mother was presented her degree, she received a standing ovation; it was also noted that Adlai Stevenson received vigorous applause, second only to that of the Queen Mother.

== Conferences ==
The Columbia University Bicentennial Conferences were five or six conferences held over 1954 that accompanied each bicentennial convocation in pairs. In line with the structure of the convocation series, the scope of the conferences started with the city and eventually expanded to the global scale. The papers presented at the conferences were compiled and published in 1955 in the Columbia University Bicentennial Conference Series. Though the "Responsible Freedom in the Americas" conference was generally excluded from the official series, its papers were published along with the others.

- "The Metropolis in Modern Life", the first bicentennial conference, was held from January 7 to 10. Over 200 scholars participated in discussions on the past, present, and future of New York City; the effects of urbanization and its relationship with religion; and urban planning. Its meetings were held at Synod House at the Cathedral of St. John the Divine.
- "Federalism, Mature and Emergent" was held from January 11 to 14. The conference took place at Arden, an estate near Harriman, New York that was once owned by Columbia. 60 scholars in the fields of political science, law, and government participated. In one notable incident, the participants unanimously condemned the proposed Bricker Amendment. Its compilation was edited by Arthur MacMahon.
- "National Policy for Economic Welfare at Home and Abroad" was held on campus from May 26 to 29. It focused on American economic policy, and was attended by over 200 scholars, business and labor leaders, and government officials, including Chair of the Council of Economic Advisors Arthur F. Burns, Cambridge professor Dennis Robertson, Secretary of Commerce W. Averell Harriman, Ambassador Philip Jessup, Ambassador to Argentina Spruille Braden, Nobel laureate economist Gunnar Myrdal, Chairman of the Tennessee Valley Authority Gunnar Myrdal, and General Lucius D. Clay. Also in attendance were several United Nations delegates, including Patras Bokhari of Pakistan, William Borberg of Denmark, Rajeshwar Dayal of India, Hans Engen of Norway, José Vicente Trujillo of Ecuador, and Fernand van Langenhove of Belgium. Its compilation was edited by Robert Lekachman.
- "National Policies for Education, Health and Social Services" was held from June 2 to 5. It covered the topic of social welfare, contemporary social issues, and the role of government in solving them. Participants included Senator J. Lister Hill, Secretary of Health, Education, and Welfare Oveta Culp Hobby, Eleanor Roosevelt, and US Surgeon General Leonard A. Scheele, in addition to 22 college presidents. Its compilation was edited by James Earl Russell.
- "The Unity of Knowledge" was held at Arden from October 27 to 30. As the final conference of the official series, its discussions touched directly on the theme of the Bicentennial, "Man's Right to Knowledge and the Free Use Thereof". Participants included Niels Bohr, biologist Julian Huxley, Librarian of Congress Archibald MacLeish, and mathematician Hermann Weyl. Topics discussed included "The Knowledge of Man," "The Methods of Knowledge," "The Languages of Knowledge," "The Unity of Knowledge," and "Man's Right to Knowledge." Its compilation was edited by Lewis Leary.
- "Responsible Freedom in the Americas" was held from October 25 to 30, and was described as a "new milestone... in inter-American relations". The conference took place at the Carnegie Endowment for International Peace, which co-sponsored the event. Participants included six presidents of Latin American nations, including Galo Plaza and Alberto Lleras Camargo of Ecuador, Eduardo Santos of Colombia, Otilio Ulate Blanco of Costa Rica, Carlos Dávila of Chile, Ricardo J. Alfaro of Panama, in addition to Nobel laureates Gabriela Mistral and Bernardo Houssay, United States Ambassador to Chile Claude Bowers, and Chairman of the Carnegie Endowment for International Peace Harvey Hollister Bundy. Its compilation was edited by Angel del Río.

Other conferences that met during the Bicentennial include the International Congress on Art History and Museology, held in cooperation with the Metropolitical Museum of Art; "Community Security vs. Man's Right to Knowledge," which was co-sponsored by the American Foreign Law Association, New York City Bar Association, and Fund for the Republic; and the final annual meeting of the American Physical Society to be held on Columbia's campus, where it had been founded in 1899.

== Panel exhibit ==
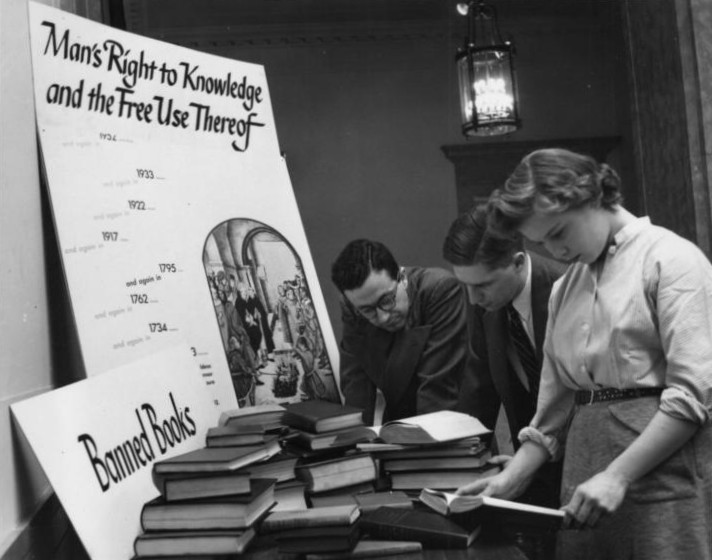
Students examining a display in Butler Library on banned books

A panel exhibit was created by the Columbia University Libraries to encourage engagement with the Bicentennial theme libraries across the country. It was designed by an exhibit committee, which included the historians Henry Steele Commager and Allan Nevins, and with input from university faculty. The exhibit consisted of 60 panels, each one centering around one of five sub-themes: "The Inclusiveness of Man", "The Value of Knowledge", "The Aspects of Man's Right to Knowledge", "Man's Right to the Free Use of Knowledge", and "The Responsibilities of Knowledge". Panels contained quotes, illustrations, and charts, and covered topics including totalitarianism, illiteracy, racial segregation, women's rights, low voter participation, the compulsory recitation of the Pledge of Allegiance, and textbook censorship, among other historical controversies. The exhibit was reproduced in either full sets of 60 panels or smaller sets of 25, and were loaned to universities, libraries, and museums across the United States and Canada for display. Additionally, the United States Information Agency of Department of State commissioned twelve sets of the exhibition for circulation abroad, spending over $16,000.

The exhibit began touring the east coast on January 1, 1954. On that day alone, it was recorded that copies of the exhibit opened at Amherst College, the New York City Bar Association, Bates College, Boston Public Library, Chicago Public Library, Colgate University, Elizabeth Public Library, Enoch Pratt Free Library, Evansville College, East Orange Public Library, Iowa State University, Marygrove College, Newark Public Library, the New York City Board of Education, Roosevelt University, Toledo Public Library, Virginia State Library, Whitworth University, Worcester Public Library, and the University of Pittsburgh. At each institution, the exhibit would stay for about two weeks before moving on to another. In total, an estimated 900,000 people saw the exhibit at more than 400 locations in the United States and Canada, with an additional 700,000 viewing it at 300 sites abroad. Internationally, the panel exhibit met with some controversy. In one noted instance, the Belfast Telegraph reported that the display at Trinity College Dublin had three of its panels removed shortly after the exhibition opened, including one featuring a quotation from the Library Bill of Rights.

== The bicentennial in media ==
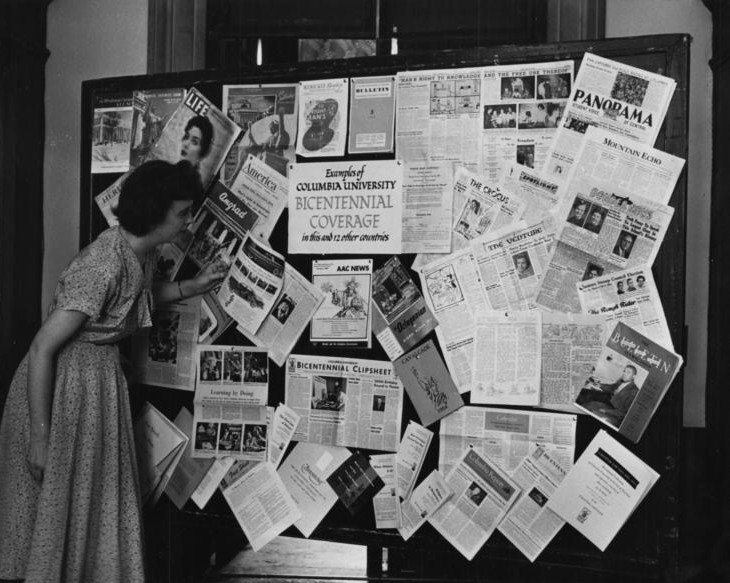
A bulletin board in Butler Library showing examples of bicentennial coverage in the United States and twelve other countries

From its planning stages all the way up to October 1954, the Columbia bicentennial received extensive media coverage. It was covered particularly in depth by The New York Times, whose publisher Arthur Hays Sulzberger played an integral role in its organization. From November 1953 to March 1954, the event was covered on over 150 local and network radio and TV shows, such as WNYC, which agreed to make weekly reports on the Bicentennial. Several networks also directly participated in the celebrations, airing media based on the Bicentennial theme in cooperation with the university.

As part of the Bicentennial's educational theme, the university created Man's Right to Knowledge, a series of twenty-six radio lectures which aired weekly on CBS. The series was released in two thirteen-episode parts, the first, titled Man's Right to Knowledge: Tradition and Change, running from January 3 to March 28, the second, titled Man's Right to Knowledge: Present Knowledge and Future Directions, from October 3 to December 26. The final lecture, which marked the end of the Bicentennial, was delivered by J. Robert Oppenheimer in his first public appearance since he had been stripped of his government security clearance in June. The series was translated and rebroadcast across the world, and won a 1954 Peabody Award for its "unprecedented impact", and the way it "stimulated a crusade for free inquiry and free expression—and helped to give to millions of individuals a deeper understanding of their rights to knowledge."

CBS also showed Invitation to Learning, which hosted a Columbia professor and focused on a different book that exemplified the Bicentennial theme for thirteen weeks beginning on April 4, 1954, as well as Twentieth Century Concert Hall, a classical music program featuring the CBS Radio Chamber Orchestra.

New York Album was a quiz show about the history of New York City, co-sponsored by the Columbia Center for Mass Communication and WNBC. Its questions were based on The Columbia Historical Portrait of New York, which was published in 1953 in preparation for the Bicentennial. It aired on December 19, 1953, and lasted thirteen weeks. Through the Iron Curtain, produced by the Harriman Institute, aired each Wednesday on ABC. Individual schools at Columbia also sponsored their own programs: Teachers College created "Camera on Citizenship" and "Schools at Work" for WNET, while the School of Journalism created "Newsarama" for WPIX.

Other radio and television shows involved in the Bicentennial included the New York Times Youth Forum, whose December 19, 1953, episode involved a conversation between Averell Harriman and six college students on the Bicentennial theme. The anthology series The United States Steel Hour and Hall of Fame, as well as the drama series Robert Montgomery Presents each included episodes that year that were shaped around the theme, while the documentary series See It Now created an episode on communism and free speech in the spirit of the Bicentennial.

== Concurrent celebrations ==
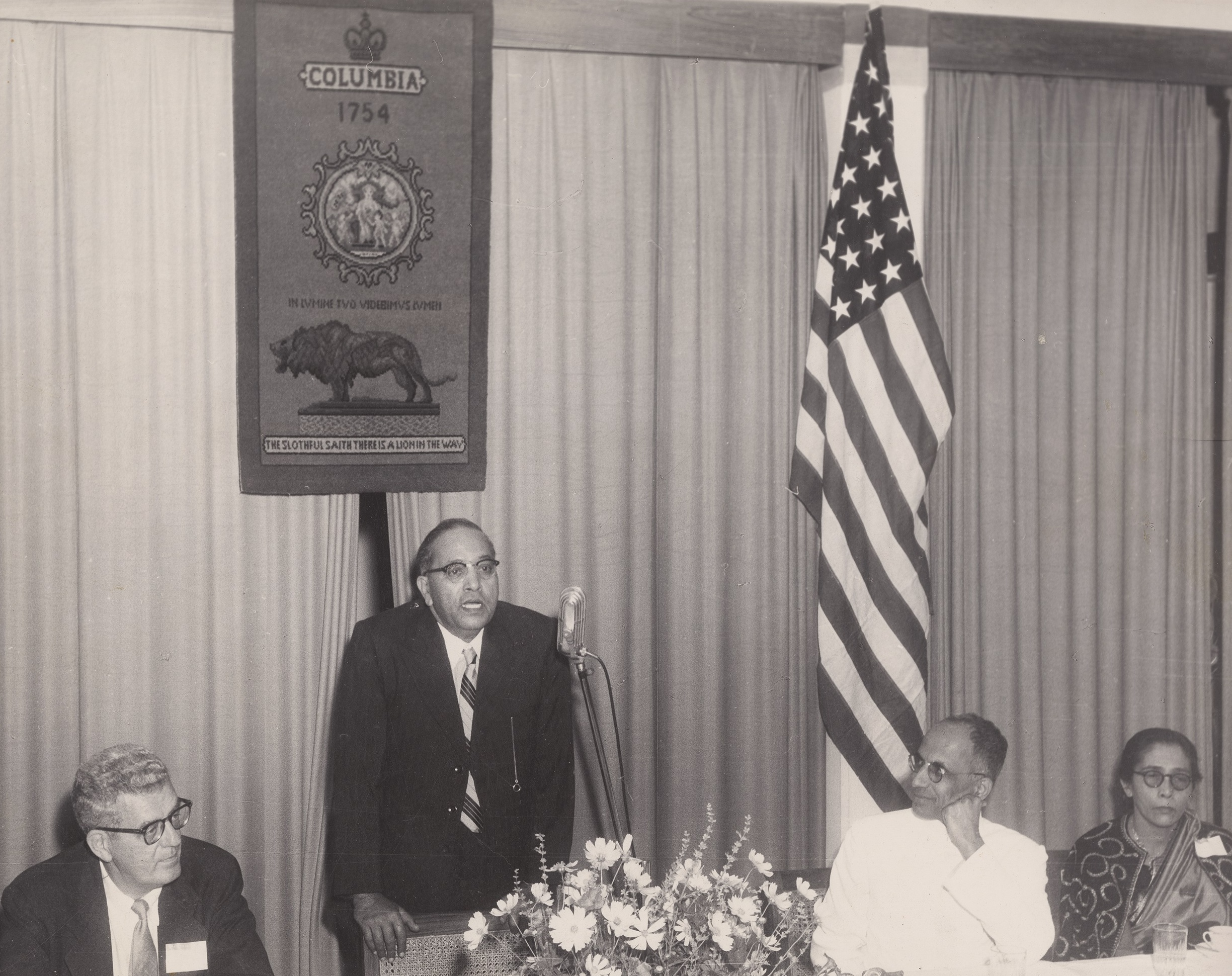
Alumnus B. R. Ambedkar addresses a bicentennial seminar in New Delhi, India, October 30, 1954.

In total, over 750 domestic and 350 foreign institutions participated in the Bicentennial, either through participation in events in New York City, or through engagement with the Bicentennial on their own campuses. Chatham House, the University of Malta, and the Sapienza University of Rome each held lecture series on the Bicentennial theme; the Académie des Sciences Morales et Politiques hosted discussion assemblies; and the Turkish Historical Society and the Bolivian Congress Library made publications in honor of the Bicentennial, while the University of British Columbia set aside a week in 1954 for public meetings, lectures, seminars, and discussions on the Bicentennial theme. The Bicentennial was celebrated at the University of the Ryukyus during the groundbreaking ceremony for its new library in an address by its founder, Henry Earl Diffenderfer.

On June 27, 1954, at a ceremony in Seoul, South Korea, 400 members of the Student Corps to Preserve the Nation gathered at a high school while the fourteen highest performing university students in the nation read papers on Bicentennial theme; speakers at the event included Vice President of Seoul National University I. S. Yun, Professor Lim Han Yung of Chosun Christian College, Professor Kim Jun Sup of SNU, and Lee Choong Nan of Ewha Womans University. Thirty Columbia alumni were in attendance, including four members of the National Assembly of the Republic of Korea and President of Ehwa Womans University Helen Kim.

Several museums in New York City also held special exhibits to celebrate the Bicentennial. The Metropolitan Museum of Art, where Columbia professors had been lecturing since 1892, opened an exhibit called "American Painting, 1754–1954" in December 1953. The Museum of the City of New York and the New-York Historical Society both opened exhibits on the history of Columbia, featuring photographs, letters, documents, and rare books lent by the university, in January 1954. A National Academy of Design Americana exhibit, "Memorabilia 1800–1900", opened in October and was based on the Bicentennial theme, showing depictions of events such as the burning Joan of Arc or women voting for the first time to illustrate "the conflict between truth and error" and "the inclusiveness of man without distinction of sex," and works such as The Races of Mankind by Malvina Hoffman, which interrogated questions of race.

== See also ==
- Harvard Tercentenary celebration
