= William Russell =

William Russell may refer to:

Ordered chronologically

== Actors ==
- William Russell (American actor) (1884–1929), American stage and screen actor
- William D. Russell (director) (1908–1968), American film and television director
- William Russell (English actor) (1924–2024), British film and television actor

== Businessmen ==
- William Russell (banker) (1734–1817) English collier and banker
- William Russell (merchant) (1740–1818), English merchant
- William Hepburn Russell (1812–1872), American freight contractor, founder of Pony Express
- William Greeneberry Russell (1818–1887), American prospector and miner
- William Hamilton Russell (1856–1907), American architect

== Clergy ==
- William Russell (bishop of Sodor) (before 1300–1374), Cistercian prelate from Isle of Man
- William Russell (bishop of North China) (1821–1879), Irish Protestant missionary to China
- William Thomas Russell (1863–1927), American Roman Catholic bishop of Charleston

== Educators ==
- William Russell (educator) (1798–1873), American teacher born in Scotland
- William Fletcher Russell (1890–1956), American educator; president of Teachers College
- William D. Russell (historian) (born 1938), American history professor

== Judges ==
- William Oldnall Russell (1785–1833), English chief justice of Bengal
- William Alison Russell (1875–1948), Scottish lawyer and judge

== Politicians ==
=== Kingdom of England ===
- William Russell (knight) (1257–1311), holder of a moiety of the feudal barony of North Cadbury, Somerset
- William Russell, 1st Baron Russell of Thornhaugh (1553/63–1613), English military commander
- Sir William Russell, 1st Baronet, of Chippenham (before 1585–1654), English MP for Windsor
- Sir William Russell, 1st Baronet, of Wytley (1602–1669), English MP for Worcestershire
- William Russell, 1st Duke of Bedford (1616–1700), English peer and soldier
- William Russell, Lord Russell (1639–1683), English politician

=== United Kingdom ===
- Sir William Russell (Mitchell MP) (1643–1705), English politician and liveryman
- Sir William Russell, 4th Baronet (c. 1654–1709), Anglo-Irish politician
- Lord William Russell (1767–1840), Member of Parliament (MP) best known as a murder victim
- William Congreve Russell (1778–1850), MP and high sheriff of Worcestershire
- William Russell (Durham MP) (1798–1850), MP
- William Russell, 8th Duke of Bedford (1809–1872), MP
- Sir William Russell, 2nd Baronet (1822–1892), MP
- William Russell (Bolton MP) (1859–1937), MP
- William Russell (Lord Mayor) (born 1965), Lord Mayor of London (2019–2021)

=== United States ===
- William Russell (Virginia politician) (1735–1793), Virginia frontier soldier and legislator, father of William Russell of Kentucky
- William Russell (Kentucky politician) (1758–1825), American soldier, pioneer, and politician
- William Russell (Ohio politician) (1782–1845), U.S. representative from Ohio
- William F. Russell (Florida politician) (c. 1805–after 1875), speaker of Florida House of Representatives
- William Huntington Russell (1809–1885), businessman, educator and politician from Connecticut
- William Fiero Russell (1812–1896), American congressman from New York
- William A. Russell (New York politician) (after 1820–before 1897)
- William A. Russell (Massachusetts politician) (1831–1899), U.S. representative from Massachusetts
- William E. Russell (politician) (1857–1896), governor of Massachusetts between 1891 and 1894
- William Hepburn Russell (baseball) (1857–1911), lawyer, politician and owner of Boston Braves
- William W. Russell (1858–1944), ambassador to Colombia, 1904–1905 and to Venezuela, 1905–1908

=== Oceania ===
- William Russell (New South Wales politician) (1807–1866), member of the New South Wales Legislative Assembly
- William Russell (New Zealand politician) (1838–1913), member of parliament
- William Russell (Australian politician) (1842–1912), Australian senator from South Australia

== Scientists ==
- William James Russell (1830–1909), English chemist
- William Russell (physician) (1852–1940), Scottish pathologist
- William L. Russell (psychiatrist) (1863–1951), president of the American Psychiatric Association, 1931–1932
- William Ritchie Russell (1903–1980), British neurologist
- William L. Russell (geneticist) (1910–2003), British-American geneticist

== Soldiers ==
- William Worthington Russell (1821–1862), US Marine Corps officer
- Sir William Russell, 2nd Baronet (1822–1892), British Army lieutenant-general
- William Carmichael Russell (1824–1905), British Bengal artillery officer

== Sportsmen ==
- William Russell (cricketer) (1866–1929), Australian-born English first-class cricketer
- William Russell (rugby union) (1880–1933), Scottish international rugby union player
- William Russell (fencer) (1896–1958), American Olympic fencer
- Willie Russell (1901–1944), Scottish footballer
- Willie Russell (footballer, born 1903) (1908–1953), Scottish footballer
- Bill Russell (pitcher) (William Russell), American Negro league baseball pitcher
- Bill Russell (William Felton Russell, 1934–2022), American basketball player
- Billy Russell (footballer, born 1935) (William Russell, 1935–2022), English footballer
- Eric Russell (cricketer) (William Eric Russell, 1936–2026), Scottish-born English cricketer
- Bill Russell (shortstop) (William Ellis Russell, born 1948), American baseball shortstop, coach and manager
- Billy Russell (footballer, born 1959) (William McKnight Russell, born 1959), Scottish footballer

== Writers ==
- William Russell (Scottish writer) (1741–1793)
- William Russell (fiction writer) (1806–1876), English writer of detective and other stories
- William Wilkins Russell (1807–1892), composer and teacher of music in Tasmania, Australia
- William Clark Russell (1844–1911), English writer of nautical novels
- Willy Russell (born 1947), English playwright, lyricist and composer

== Others ==
- Sir William Russell, 1st Baronet, of Charlton Park (1773–1839), Scottish physician
- William Russell (organist) (1777–1813), English composer
- Elizabeth, Lady William Russell (1793–1874), English socialite, wife of Lord George William Russell
- William Howard Russell (1820–1907), Irish reporter and one of the first modern war correspondents

== See also ==
- Bill Russell (disambiguation)
- Russell Williams (disambiguation)
- William Russel (disambiguation)
