= Bill Russell (disambiguation) =

Bill Russell (1934–2022) was an American basketball player and coach.

Bill or Billy Russell may also refer to:

== Entertainment ==
- Bill Russell (composer) (1905–1992), American music historian and modernist composer
- Bill Russell (lyricist) (born 1949), American librettist and lyricist
- Billy Russell (comedian) (1893–1971), English comedian and actor

== Sports ==
- Bill Russell (pitcher) (fl. 1944), American baseball player
- Bill Russell (shortstop) (born 1948), American baseball player and manager
- Billy Russell (footballer, born 1935) (1935–2022), English amateur international footballer
- Billy Russell (footballer, born 1959), Scottish footballer and manager

== See also ==
- William Russell (disambiguation)
