= William Russel =

William Russel may refer to:

- William Russell (English actor) (1924–2024), English actor
- William Russel (minister) (died 1702), English minister
- William B. Russel (1945–2023), American chemical engineer
- William Channing Russel (1814 – 1896), American historian and lawyer, first vice president of Cornell University

== See also ==
- William Russell (disambiguation)
