= Russell Williams =

Russell Williams may refer to:

== Sportspeople ==
- Russell Williams (footballer) (born 1974), former Australian rules footballer
- Russell Williams (cyclist) (born 1961), English former road and track cyclist

== Politicians ==
- Russell Williams (politician) (born 1953), former politician in Quebec, Canada
- T. Russell Williams (1869–1926), British socialist politician

== Others ==
- Russell Williams (criminal) (born 1963), Canadian convicted rapist and murderer and former Colonel in the Canadian Forces
- Russ Williams (DJ) (born 1962), English radio DJ
- Russell Williams II (born 1952), American sound mixer and two-time Oscar winner

== See also ==
- Williams (surname)
- William Russell (disambiguation)
