= Rostislav Rybakov =

Russian scholar, writer, and Indologist (1938–2019)

Rostislav Rybakov Ростислав Рыбаков
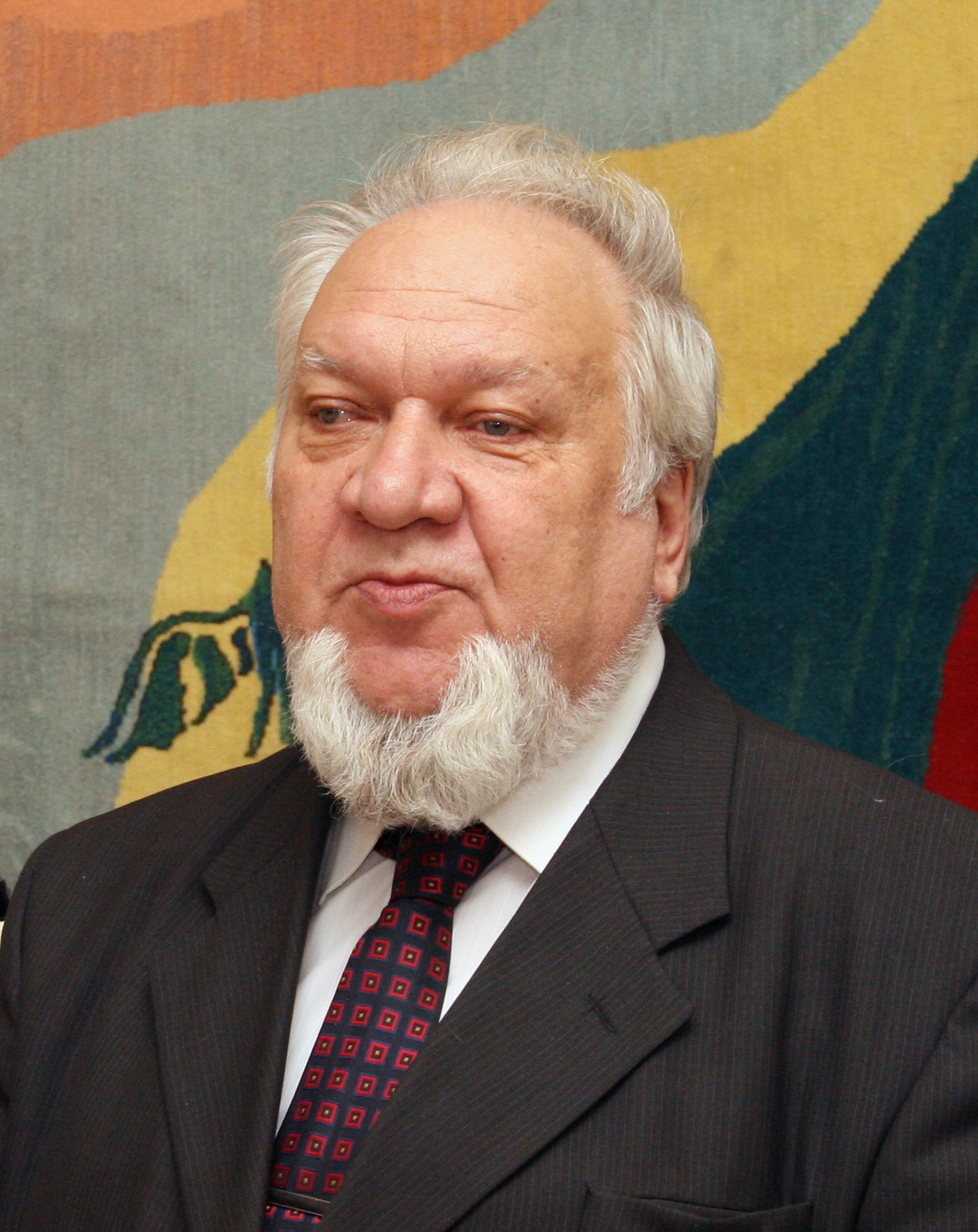
- Rostislav Rybakov in 2009
- Born: 28 March 1938; Moscow, Russia
- Died: 7 August 2019 (aged 81)
- Occupations: Scholar; Orientalist; Indologist
- Known for: Oriental Studies
- Awards: Padma Shri; Labour Valour Fund Award

Rostislav Borisovich Rybakov (Russian: Ростислав Борисович Рыбаков; 28 March 1938 – 7 August 2019 in Moscow, Russia) was a Russian scholar of Oriental Studies, writer, Indologist and the director of the Institute of Oriental Studies of the Russian Academy of Sciences (Institute of Oriental Studies). He heads the Institute of Oriental Manuscripts of the Academy and is a former president (2006–2008) of the Dialogue Eurasia Platform (DAP), one of the five forums under the Journalists and Writers Foundation (JWF), promoting peaceful coexistence through dialogue and understanding. He has also been associated with the International Centre of the Roerichs and is one of the founders of PEACE through CULTURE, a non governmental organization based in Austria.

He was a son of Russian historian Boris Rybakov.

The Government of India awarded him the fourth highest civilian honour of the Padma Shri, in 2007, for his contributions to literature and education. He is also a recipient of the Labour Valour Fund Award of 2013.

Rybakov died on 7 August 2019 at the age of 81.

== See also ==
- Nicholas Roerich
