= Andrey Kursanov =

Soviet botanist and biochemist (1902–1999)

- Андрей Курсанов
- Born: Andrey Lvovich Kursanov; 8 November 1902; Moscow, Russian Empire
- Died: 20 September 1999 (aged 96); Moscow, Russia
- Citizenship: Soviet Union
- Education: Moscow State University
- Known for: Contributions to the theory of the origin of life coacervates
- Scientific career
- Fields: Biochemistry
- Workplaces: Moscow State University; Academy of Sciences of the Soviet Union

Andrey Lvovich Kursanov (Russian: Андрей Львович Курсанов; 8 November 1902 – 20 September 1999) was a Soviet specialist on the physiology and biochemistry of plants. He was an academician of the Soviet and Russian Academies of Sciences since 1953. He was a member of the Presidium of the Academy of Sciences of the Soviet Union in 1957–1963.

Kursanov graduated from Moscow State University in 1926. He was awarded the degree of Doctor of Sciences in biology in 1940 and became a professor at his alma mater in 1944. In 1954, Kursanov and Boris Rybakov represented the Soviet Academy of Sciences at the Columbia University Bicentennial in New York City.

Professor Kursanov was awarded a number of honorary doctorates and was an honorary member of a number of foreign scientific societies and academies. He was elected a foreign fellow of the American Academy of Arts and Sciences in 1962 and member of the Polish Academy of Sciences in 1965.

== Awards and honors ==
- Hero of Socialist Labour (1969)
- Order of Lenin, four times (1953, 1969, 1972, 1975)
- Order of the October Revolution (1982)
- Order of the Red Banner of Labour, twice (1945, 1962)
- Lomonosov Gold Medal (1983)
