= Victor L. Butterfield =

- Born: February 7, 1904; Kingston, Rhode Island
- Died: November 19, 1975 (aged 71)
- Education: Cornell University; Harvard University
- Scientific career
- Fields: Philosophy

Victor L. Butterfield (February 7, 1904 – November 19, 1975) was an American philosopher and educator who served as the eleventh President of Wesleyan University from 1943 to 1967.

== Early life and education ==
He was born February 7, 1904, in Kingston, Rhode Island, to Harriet M. and Kenyon L. Butterfield. He attended Cornell University and received his B.A. in 1927 and M.A. in 1928. In 1936 he earned a Ph.D. from Harvard.

== Career at Wesleyan University ==
During Butterfield's tenure as president of Wesleyan, the longest in its history, the number of faculty and students doubled, and its endowment increased from $10 million to $150 million.
