= Sir William Russell, 1st Baronet, of Charlton Park =

Scottish physician (1773–1839)

Sir William Russell, 1st Baronet, of Charlton Park (29 May 1773 – 26 September 1839) was a Scottish physician.

== Life ==
Born at Edinburgh, he was the sixth son of John Russell of Roseburne, near Edinburgh, a writer to the signet, and uncle to Daniel Eliott. After taking the degree of M.D. at Edinburgh, he went to Calcutta. where he acquired a large medical practice.

In London for the cholera epidemic, he was created a baronet on 18 February 1832 for his medical services, and in April was elected a Fellow of the Royal Society. He died at Charlton Park, Gloucestershire at the age of 66.

== Family ==
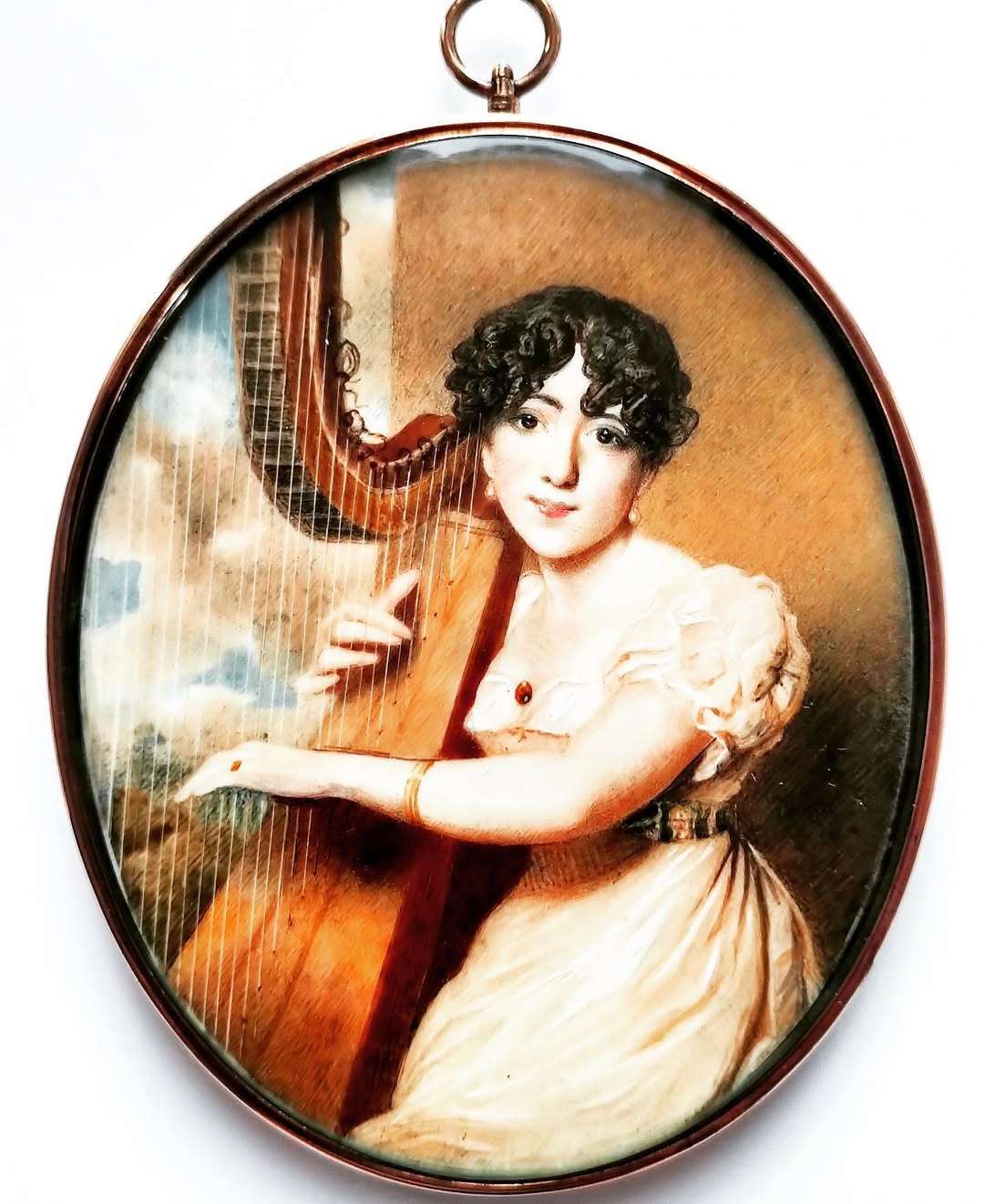
Russell's second wife, Jane Eliza Sherwood, portrait by Maria Bellett Browne

Sir William Russell, 2nd Baronet (1822–1892), British Army officer, was his son.

== Notes ==
Baronetage of the United Kingdom
New creation	Baronet (of Charlton Park); 1832–1839	Succeeded by William Russell
