= Boris Rybakov =

Soviet archaeologist (1908–2001)

Boris Aleksandrovich Rybakov (Russian: Борис Александрович Рыбаков; 3 June 1908, Moscow – 27 December 2001, Moscow) was a Soviet and Russian archeologist and historian. He was one of the main proponents of anti-Normanist vision of Russian history. He is the father of Indologist Rostislav Rybakov.

== Early life ==
Rybakov was born in a Russian Old Believer family.

== Life and works ==
Rybakov held a chair in Russian history at the Moscow University since 1939, was a deputy dean of the university in 1952–54, and administered the Russian History Institute for more than 40 years. In 1954, Rybakov and Andrey Kursanov represented the Soviet Academy of Sciences at the Columbia University Bicentennial in New York City.

His first groundbreaking monograph was the Handicrafts of Ancient Rus (1948), which sought to demonstrate the economic superiority of Kyivan Rus to contemporary Western Europe.

Rybakov led important excavations in Moscow, Novgorod, Zvenigorod, Chernihiv, Pereiaslav, Tmutarakan and Putyvl and published his findings in numerous monographs, including Antiquities of Chernigov (1949), The Chronicles and Bylinas of Ancient Rus (1963), The First Centuries of Russian history (1964), The Tale of Igor's Campaign and Its Contemporaries (1971), Muscovite Maps of the 15th and early 16th Centuries (1974), and Herodotus' Scythia (1979). In the latter book he viewed the Scythians described by Herodotus as ancestors of modern Slavic nations.

In his older years, Rybakov attempted to reconstruct the pantheon and myths of Slavic religion. He outlined his ideas in Ancient Slavic Paganism (1981) and Ancient Paganism of Rus (1987). Some of these reconstructions have been heavily criticized as far-fetched.

== Honours and awards ==
- Hero of Socialist Labour (1978)
- Order "For Merit to the Fatherland", 3rd class (31 May 1998) – for services to the state, his great personal contribution to the development of national science and training of scientific personnel
- Three Orders of Lenin (1968, 1971, 1978)
- Order of the October Revolution (1975)
- Order of the Red Banner of Labour (1945)
- Order of the Badge of Honour (1953)
- Order of Friendship of Peoples (1988)
- Lenin Prize (1976)
- Two Stalin Prizes (1949, 1952)
- Medal "In Commemoration of the 1500th Anniversary of Kiev" (1982)
- Grekov award
- Member of the Russian Academy of Sciences
- Honorary member of the Czechoslovak, Polish and Bulgarian Academy of Sciences
- Emeritus Professor of Moscow University
- Doctor of Historical Sciences, Moscow State University
- Honorary doctor of the Jagiellonian University in Kraków

== Bibliography ==
- Саєнко В. М. Наукові долі О.І. Тереножкіна та Б.О. Рибакова або історія одного листа, написаного до самого себе. // Scriptorium nostrum. –– 2017. – No. 1 (7). – С. 50–86.
