= Maria Bellett Browne =

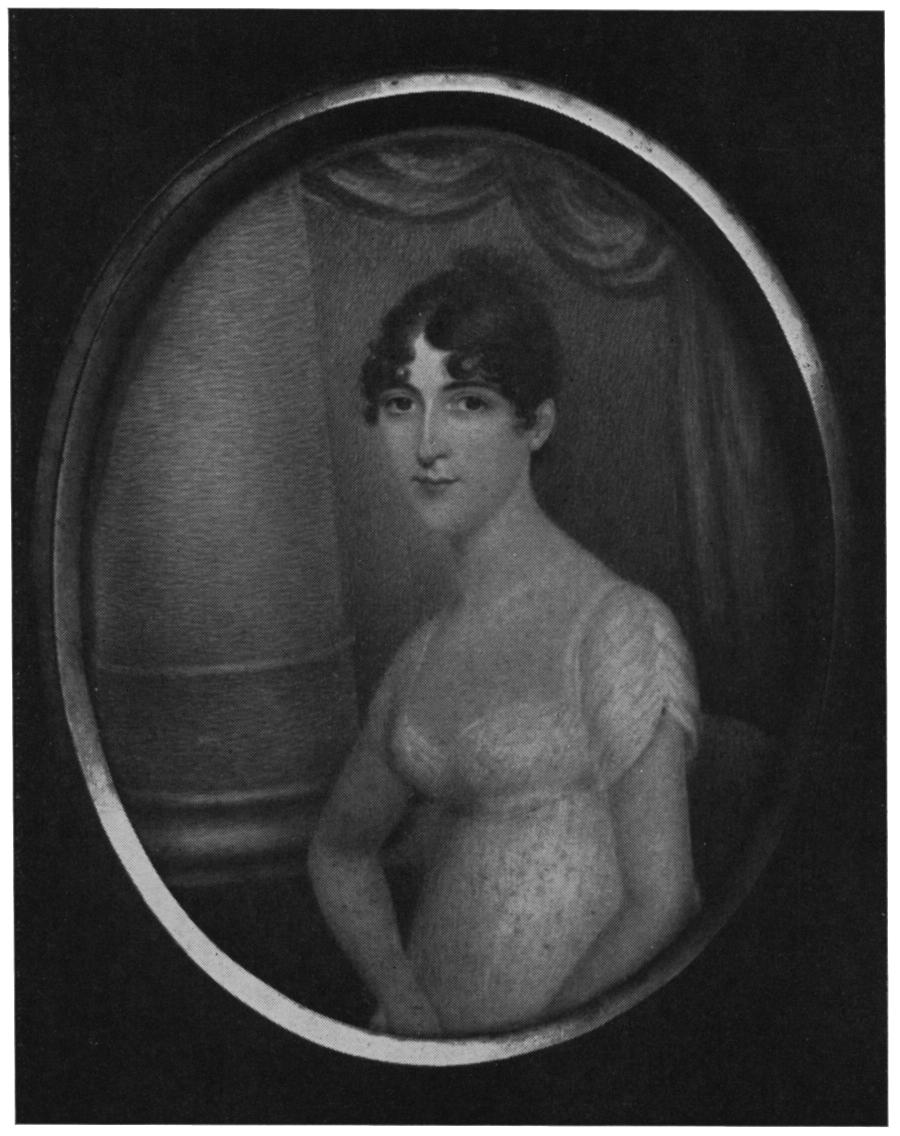
- self-portrait, 1806
- Born: 30 December 1786; London
- Died: 13 February 1828 (aged 41)
- Occupation: Painter

Maria Bellett Browne (30 December 1786 – 13 February 1828) was a British miniature painter in British India.

Maria Bellett Roberts was born on 30 December 1786 in London, the daughter of Arundel Roberts and Mary Bellett Roberts. She was educated in Samford Arundel. At the age of 19, she accompanied her brother Arundel Roberts, Jr., an East India Company agent, to Calcutta. In 1806, she married Marmaduke Browne, an East India Company military officer stationed at Fort William. They had two sons, Arthur and Tom, and two daughters who died in infancy.

In Calcutta, she painted at least a hundred portrait miniatures of British people, usually giving them as gifts or in trade. She studied under the painter George Chinnery and they carried on an extensive correspondence about art techniques and theories.

In 1823, she and her husband returned to England. Plagued with poor health, she remained in Samford Arundel while he returned to India. She died on 13 February 1828.

== Gallery ==
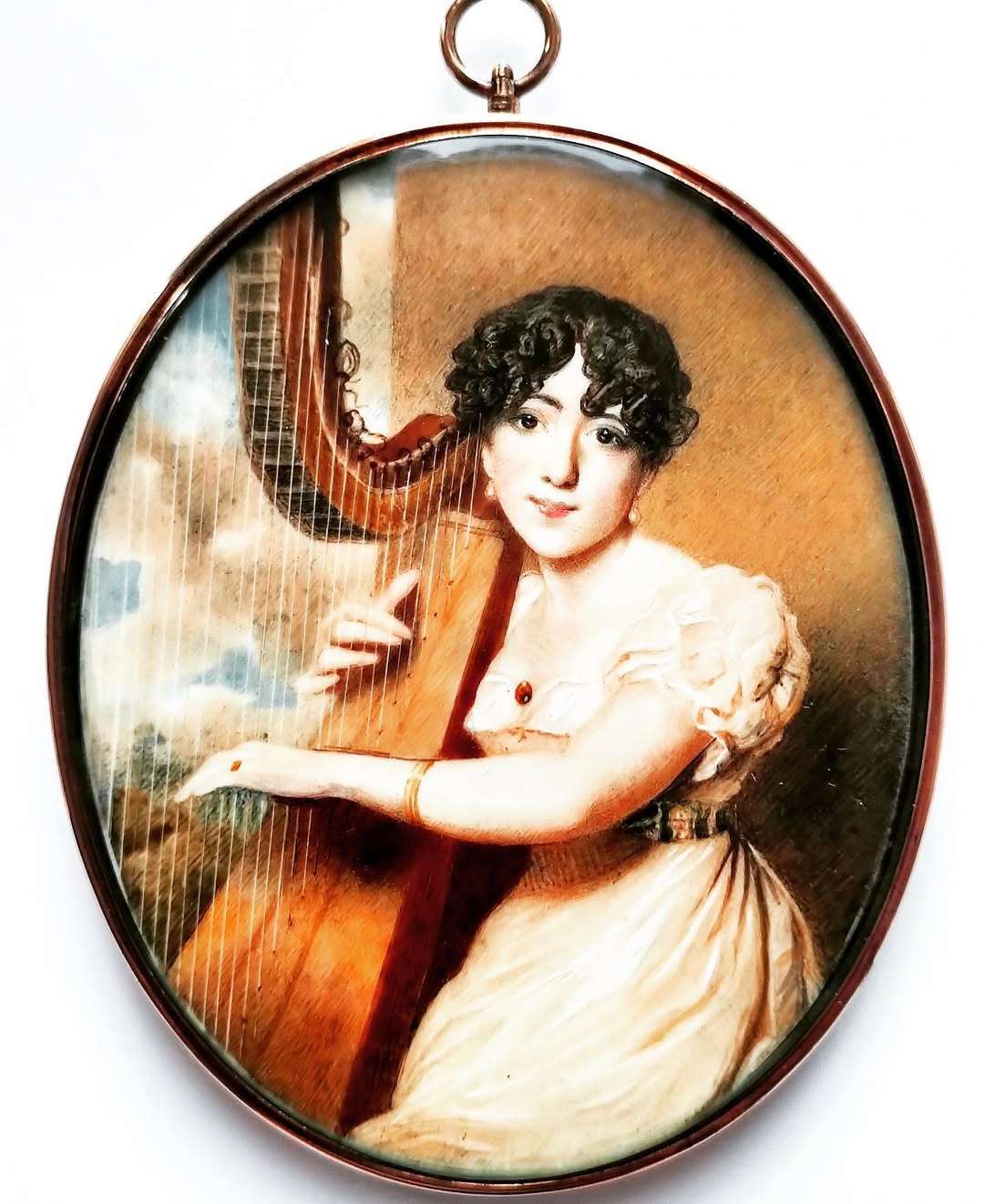
Jane Eliza Sherwood Russell

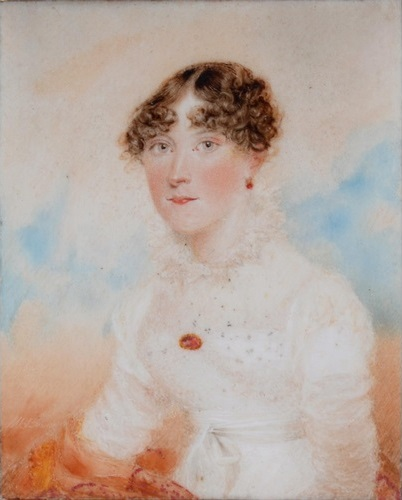
Mrs. Thomas Browne

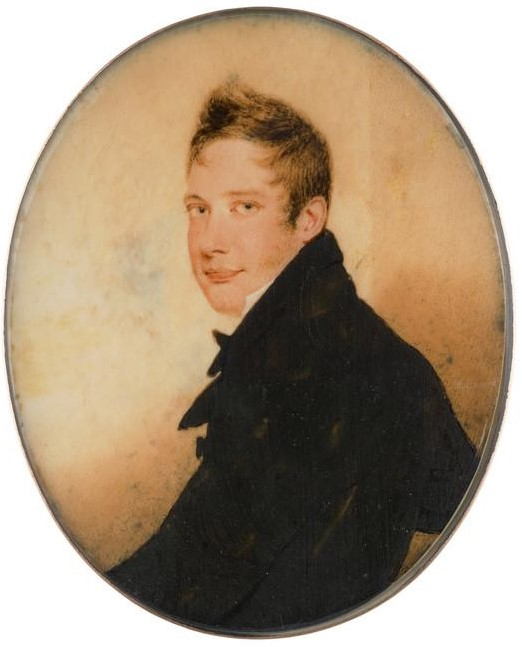
James Atkinson
