= William Fletcher Russell =

American educator (1890–1956)

- Born: May 18, 1890; Delhi, New York
- Died: March 26, 1956 (aged 65); Washington D.C.

William Fletcher Russell (May 18, 1890 – March 26, 1956) was an American educator, and dean (1927–1949) and president (1949–1954) of Teachers College, Columbia University, New York City.

Russell was born in Delhi, New York. The son of James Earl Russell. He graduated from Cornell University in 1910, and earned a PhD at Columbia University in 1914.

From 1917 to 1923, he was dean of the College of Education, State University of Iowa.

In 1923, he visited Bulgaria to study aspects of the local educational system.

In 1927 he became dean of Teachers College, a position which his father held prior to him. He became president of Teachers College in 1949, retired in 1954, then served as deputy director for Technical Services of the International Cooperation Administration.

Russell died 1956 in Washington D.C. of a heart attack.

== Works ==
- How to Judge a School
- Economy in Secondary Education (1916)
- Education in the United States (1917)
- Schools in Bulgaria (1924)
- The Meaning of Democracy (with T. H. Briggs, 1941)
- The Rise of a University (as editor) (Vol. I, 1937)
- "Liberty vs. Equality" (1936)

Academic offices
Preceded by James Earl Russell	President of Teachers College, Columbia University; 1949 – 1954	Succeeded by Hollis L. Caswell
