= Bill Russell (pitcher) =

American baseball player

- Pitcher

Negro league baseball debut
- 1944, for the New York Black Yankees

Last appearance
- 1944, for the New York Black Yankees

Teams
- New York Black Yankees (1944)

William Russell is an American former Negro league pitcher who played in the 1940s.

Russell played for the New York Black Yankees in 1944. In three recorded appearances on the mound, he posted a 5.87 ERA over 7.2 innings.
