= Baron Russell of Thornhaugh =

Barony in the Peerage of England

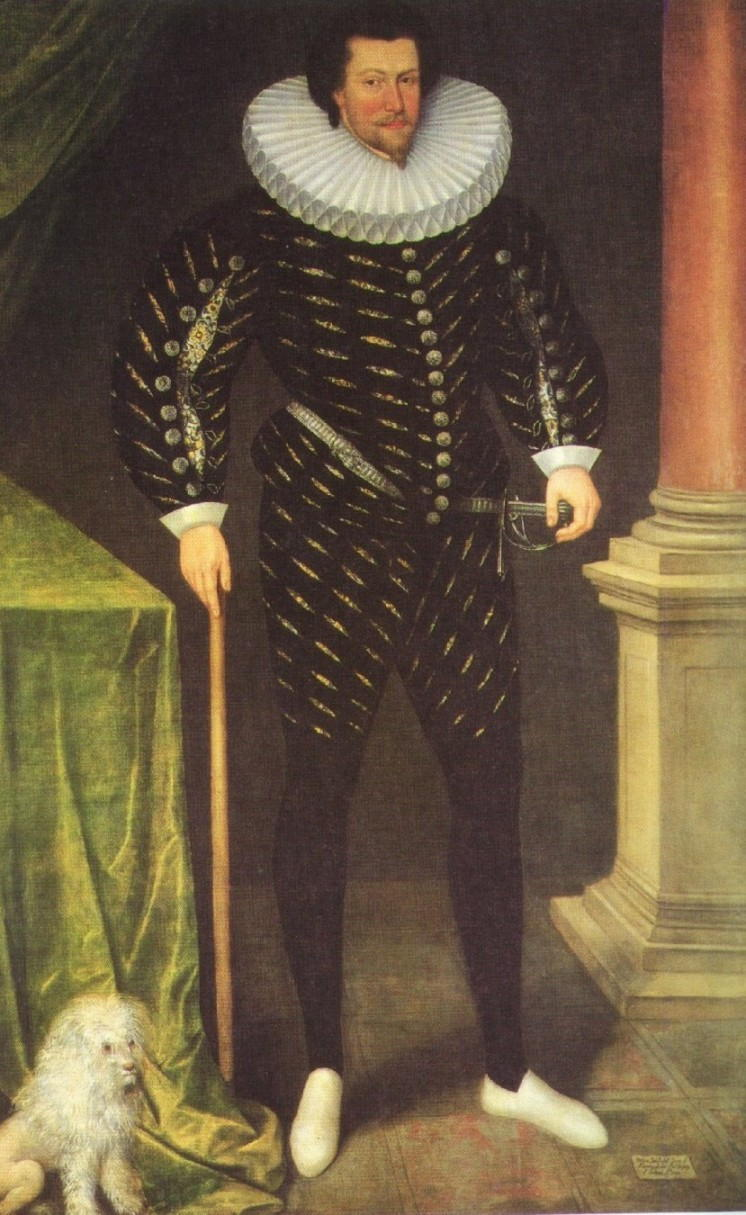
William Russell, 1st Baron Russell of Thornhaugh.

Baron Russell of Thornhaugh is a title in the Peerage of England. It was created in 1603 for the English military leader, the Honourable Sir William Russell. He was the fourth son of Francis Russell, 2nd Earl of Bedford. His son succeeded as Earl of Bedford in 1627 and the barony has been united with the earldom ever since.

== Barons Russell of Thornhaugh (1603) ==
- William Russell, 1st Baron Russell of Thornhaugh (c. 1558–1613)
- Francis Russell, 2nd Baron Russell of Thornhaugh (1593–1641) (succeeded as 4th Earl of Bedford in 1627)

For further succession, see Duke of Bedford.

== Family tree ==
Family tree: Earls of Bedford, Dukes of Bedford, Earls of Orford, and Earls Russell

King Edward III; 1312–1377
John of Gaunt; 1340–1399; Duke of Lancaster
King Henry IV; 1367–1413 | Joan Beaufort c. 1379–1440; Countess of Westmorland
Duke of Bedford (1st creation), 1414; Duke of Bedford (2nd creation), 1433
King Henry V 1386–1422 | John of Lancaster; 1389–1435; Duke of Bedford
Dukedom of Bedford (1st creation) extinct, 1432; Dukedom of Bedford (2nd creation) extinct, 1435
Catherine of Valois; 1401–1437 | Owen Tudor; 1400–1461 | Cecily Neville; 1415–1495; Duchess of York | Richard Neville; 1400–1460; 5th Earl of Salisbury
Duke of Bedford (5th creation), 1485
King Henry VI; 1421–1471 | Edmund Tudor c. 1430–1456; 1st Earl of Richmond | Jasper Tudor c. 1431–1495; Duke of Bedford | King Edward IV; 1442–1483 | King Richard III; 1452–1485 | John Neville c. 1431–1471; 1st Marquess of Montagu
Dukedom of Bedford (5th creation) extinct, 1495
Duke of Bedford (4th creation), 1478 | Duke of Bedford (3rd creation), 1470
King Henry VII; 1457–1509 | Elizabeth of York; 1466–1503 | George Plantagenet; 1477–1479; Duke of Bedford | George Neville c. 1457–1483; Duke of Bedford
Baron Russell, 1539; Earl of Bedford (3rd creation), 1551 | Dukedom of Bedford (4th creation) extinct, 1479 | Dukedom of Bedford (3rd creation) extinct, 1478
John Russell c. 1485–1555; 1st Earl of Bedford and Baron Russell
Francis Russell; 1527–1585; 2nd Earl of Bedford and Baron Russell
Baron Russell of Thornhaugh, 1603
Edward Russell; 1551–1572; Lord Russell | John Russell c. 1553–1584; Lord Russell | Francis Russell c. 1554–1585; Lord Russell | William Russell c. 1558–1613; 1st Baron Russell of Thornhaugh
Edward Russell; 1572–1627; 3rd Earl of Bedford and Baron Russell | Francis Russell; 1593–1641; 4th Earl of Bedford and Baron Russell, 2nd Baron Russell of Thornhaugh
Duke of Bedford (6th creation) and Marquess of Tavistock, 1694; Baron Howland, 1695
William Russell; 1616–1700; 1st Duke of Bedford, Marquess of Tavistock, and Baron Howland; 5th Earl of Bedford and Baron Russell, 3rd Baron Russell of Thornhaugh | Edward Russell; 1626–1665
Earl of Orford (1st creation), Viscount Barfleur and Baron of Shingay, in the County of Cambridge, 1697
Francis Russell; 1638–1679; Lord Russell | William Russell; 1639–1683; Lord Russell | Margaret Russell; 1656–1702 | Edward Russell; 1652–1727; Earl of Orford | Robert Walpole; 1650–1700
Attainted, 1683 | Earldom of Orford (1st creation) extinct, 1727
Earl of Orford (2nd creation), Viscount Walpole and Baron Walpole of Houghton in the County of Norfolk, 1742 | Baron Walpole of Wolterton in the County of Norfolk
Wriothesley Russell; 1680–1711; 2nd Duke of Bedford, Marquess of Tavistock, and Baron Howland; 5th Earl of Bedford and Baron Russell, 6th Baron Russell of Thornhaugh | Robert Walpole; 1676–1745; 1st Earl of Orford, Viscount Walpole, and Baron Walpole of Houghton | Horatio Walpole; 1678–1757; 1st Baron Walpole of Wolterton
Baron Walpole of Walpole in the County of Norfolk | Earl of Orford (3rd creation), 1806
Wriothesley Russell; 1708–1732; 3rd Duke of Bedford, Marquess of Tavistock, and Baron Howland; 5th Earl of Bedford and Baron Russell, 7th Baron Russell of Thornhaugh | John Russell; 1710–1771; 4th Duke of Bedford, Marquess of Tavistock, and Baron Howland; 8th Earl of Bedford and Baron Russell, 6th Baron Russell of Thornhaugh | Robert Walpole; 1701–1751; 2nd Earl of Orford, Viscount Walpole, and Baron Walpole of Houghton, 1st Baron Walpole of Walpole | Horace Walpole "Horatio"; 1717–1797; 4th Earl of Orford, Viscount Walpole, and Baron Walpole of Houghton, 3rd Baron Walpole of Walpole | Maria Walpole; 1725–1801 | Horatio Walpole "the Younger"; 1723–1809; 1st Earl of Orford, 4th Baron Walpole of Walpole, 2nd Baron Walpole of Wolterton
Earldom of Orford (2nd creation) extinct, 1797
Francis Russell; 1739–1767 styled Marquess of Tavistock | George Walpole; 1730–1791; 3rd Earl of Orford, Viscount Walpole, and Baron Walpole of Houghton, 2nd Baron Walpole of Walpole
Francis Russell; 1765–1802; 5th Duke of Bedford, Marquess of Tavistock, and Baron Howland; 9th Earl of Bedford and Baron Russell, 7th Baron Russell of Thornhaugh, 7th Baron Russell of Thornhaugh | John Russell; 1766–1839; 6th Duke of Bedford, Marquess of Tavistock, and Baron Howland; 10th Earl of Bedford and Baron Russell, 8th Baron Russell of Thornhaugh | William Russell; 1767–1840 | Sophia Churchill d. 1797 | Horatio Walpole; 1752–1822; 2nd Earl of Orford, 5th Baron Walpole of Walpole, 3rd Baron Walpole of Wolterton
Earl Russell and Viscount Amberley, 1861
Francis Russell; 1788–1861; 7th Duke of Bedford, Marquess of Tavistock, and Baron Howland; 11th Earl of Bedford and Baron Russell, 9th Baron Russell of Thornhaugh | George William Russell; 1790–1846 | John Russell; 1792–1878; 1st Earl Russell and Viscount Amberley | Horatio Walpole; 1783–1858; 3rd Earl of Orford, 6th Baron Walpole of Walpole, 4th Baron Walpole of Wolterton
Baron Ampthill, 1881
William Russell; 1809–1872; 8th Duke of Bedford, Marquess of Tavistock, and Baron Howland; 12th Earl of Bedford and Baron Russell, 10th Baron Russell of Thornhaugh | Francis Charles Hastings Russell; 1819–1891; 9th Duke of Bedford, Marquess of Tavistock, and Baron Howland; 13th Earl of Bedford and Baron Russell, 11th Baron Russell of Thornhaugh | Odo William Leopold Russell; 1829–1884; 1st Baron Ampthill | John Russell; 1842–1876; Viscount Amberley | Horatio Walpole; 1813–1858; 4th Earl of Orford, 7th Baron Walpole of Walpole, 5th Baron Walpole of Wolterton | Robert Walpole; 1854–1931; 5th Earl of Orford, 8th Baron Walpole of Walpole, 6th Baron Walpole of Wolterton
Earldom of Orford (3rd creation) extinct, 1931
George William Francis Sackville Russell; 1852–1893; 10th Duke of Bedford, Marquess of Tavistock, and Baron Howland; 14th Earl of Bedford and Baron Russell, 12th Baron Russell of Thornhaugh | Herbrand Arthur Russell; 1858–1940; 11th Duke of Bedford, Marquess of Tavistock, and Baron Howland; 15th Earl of Bedford and Baron Russell, 13th Baron Russell of Thornhaugh | John Francis Stanley Russell; 1865–1931; 2nd Earl Russell and Viscount Amberley | Bertrand Arthur William Russell; 1872–1970; 3rd Earl Russell and Viscount Amberley
Hastings William Sackville Russell; 1888–1953; 12th Duke of Bedford, Marquess of Tavistock, and Baron Howland; 16th Earl of Bedford and Baron Russell, 14th Baron Russell of Thornhaugh
John Ian Robert Russell; 1917–2002; 13th Duke of Bedford, Marquess of Tavistock, and Baron Howland; 17th Earl of Bedford and Baron Russell, 15th Baron Russell of Thornhaugh | John Conrad Russell; 1921–1987; 4th Earl Russell and Viscount Amberley | Conrad Sebastian Robert Russell; 1937–2004; 5th Earl Russell and Viscount Amberley
Henry Robin Ian Russell; 1940–2003; 14th Duke of Bedford, Marquess of Tavistock, and Baron Howland; 18th Earl of Bedford and Baron Russell, 16th Baron Russell of Thornhaugh
Andrew Ian Henry Russell; 15th Duke of Bedford, Marquess of Tavistock, and Baron Howland; 19th Earl of Bedford and Baron Russell, 17th Baron Russell of Thornhaugh b. 1962 | Nicholas Lyulph Russell; 1968–2014; 6th Earl Russell and Viscount Amberley | John Francis Russell b. 1971; 7th Earl Russell and Viscount Amberley
Henry Robin Charles Russell b. 2005 styled Marquess of Tavistock

== See also ==
- Earl Russell
- Baron Ampthill
- Thornhaugh
