= Earl of Bedford =

Title in the Peerage of England

Arms of Enguerrand de Coucy, 1st Earl of Bedford: Quarterly, 1st & 4th: Barry of six vair and gules (Coucy); 2nd & 3rd: Gules a fess argent (Austria)

Earl of Bedford is a title that has been created three times in the Peerage of England and is currently a subsidiary title of the Dukes of Bedford. The first creation came in 1138 in favour of Hugh de Beaumont. He appears to have been degraded from the title three or four years after its creation. The existence of his title altogether has been doubted. It is discussed by R. H. C. Davis on the basis of the chronicle evidence. However, it now appears to be accepted by historians that Hugh did receive the earldom of Bedford in 1138.

The second creation came in 1366 in favour of the French nobleman Enguerrand VII, Lord of Coucy. After Richard II came to the throne in 1377, Bedford resigned the title to the Crown. The third creation came in 1550 in favour of John Russell, 1st Baron Russell. For more information on this creation, see Duke of Bedford (1694 creation).

== Earls of Bedford, first creation (1138) ==
- Hugh de Beaumont, 1st Earl of Bedford (born 1106)

== Earls of Bedford, second creation (1366) ==
- Enguerrand VII, Lord of Coucy, 1st Earl of Bedford (1340–1397) (resigned in 1377)

== Earls of Bedford, third creation (1551) ==
- see Duke of Bedford (1694 creation)

Family tree: Earls of Bedford, Dukes of Bedford, Earls of Orford, and Earls Russell

King Edward III; 1312–1377
John of Gaunt; 1340–1399; Duke of Lancaster
King Henry IV; 1367–1413	Joan Beaufort c. 1379–1440; Countess of Westmorland
Duke of Bedford (1st creation), 1414; Duke of Bedford (2nd creation), 1433
King Henry V 1386–1422	John of Lancaster; 1389–1435; Duke of Bedford
Dukedom of Bedford (1st creation) extinct, 1432; Dukedom of Bedford (2nd creation) extinct, 1435
Catherine of Valois; 1401–1437	Owen Tudor; 1400–1461	Cecily Neville; 1415–1495; Duchess of York	Richard Neville; 1400–1460; 5th Earl of Salisbury
Duke of Bedford (5th creation), 1485
King Henry VI; 1421–1471	Edmund Tudor c. 1430–1456; 1st Earl of Richmond	Jasper Tudor c. 1431–1495; Duke of Bedford	King Edward IV; 1442–1483	King Richard III; 1452–1485	John Neville c. 1431–1471; 1st Marquess of Montagu
Dukedom of Bedford (5th creation) extinct, 1495
Duke of Bedford (4th creation), 1478	Duke of Bedford (3rd creation), 1470
King Henry VII; 1457–1509	Elizabeth of York; 1466–1503	George Plantagenet; 1477–1479; Duke of Bedford	George Neville c. 1457–1483; Duke of Bedford
Baron Russell, 1539; Earl of Bedford (3rd creation), 1551	Dukedom of Bedford (4th creation) extinct, 1479	Dukedom of Bedford (3rd creation) extinct, 1478
John Russell c. 1485–1555; 1st Earl of Bedford and Baron Russell
Francis Russell; 1527–1585; 2nd Earl of Bedford and Baron Russell
Baron Russell of Thornhaugh, 1603
Edward Russell; 1551–1572; Lord Russell	John Russell c. 1553–1584; Lord Russell	Francis Russell c. 1554–1585; Lord Russell	William Russell c. 1558–1613; 1st Baron Russell of Thornhaugh
Edward Russell; 1572–1627; 3rd Earl of Bedford and Baron Russell	Francis Russell; 1593–1641; 4th Earl of Bedford and Baron Russell, 2nd Baron Russell of Thornhaugh
Duke of Bedford (6th creation) and Marquess of Tavistock, 1694; Baron Howland, 1695
William Russell; 1616–1700; 1st Duke of Bedford, Marquess of Tavistock, and Baron Howland; 5th Earl of Bedford and Baron Russell, 3rd Baron Russell of Thornhaugh	Edward Russell; 1626–1665
Earl of Orford (1st creation), Viscount Barfleur and Baron of Shingay, in the County of Cambridge, 1697
Francis Russell; 1638–1679; Lord Russell	William Russell; 1639–1683; Lord Russell	Margaret Russell; 1656–1702	Edward Russell; 1652–1727; Earl of Orford	Robert Walpole; 1650–1700
Attainted, 1683	Earldom of Orford (1st creation) extinct, 1727
Earl of Orford (2nd creation), Viscount Walpole and Baron Walpole of Houghton in the County of Norfolk, 1742	Baron Walpole of Wolterton in the County of Norfolk
Wriothesley Russell; 1680–1711; 2nd Duke of Bedford, Marquess of Tavistock, and Baron Howland; 5th Earl of Bedford and Baron Russell, 6th Baron Russell of Thornhaugh	Robert Walpole; 1676–1745; 1st Earl of Orford, Viscount Walpole, and Baron Walpole of Houghton	Horatio Walpole; 1678–1757; 1st Baron Walpole of Wolterton
Baron Walpole of Walpole in the County of Norfolk	Earl of Orford (3rd creation), 1806
Wriothesley Russell; 1708–1732; 3rd Duke of Bedford, Marquess of Tavistock, and Baron Howland; 5th Earl of Bedford and Baron Russell, 7th Baron Russell of Thornhaugh	John Russell; 1710–1771; 4th Duke of Bedford, Marquess of Tavistock, and Baron Howland; 8th Earl of Bedford and Baron Russell, 6th Baron Russell of Thornhaugh	Robert Walpole; 1701–1751; 2nd Earl of Orford, Viscount Walpole, and Baron Walpole of Houghton, 1st Baron Walpole of Walpole	Horace Walpole "Horatio"; 1717–1797; 4th Earl of Orford, Viscount Walpole, and Baron Walpole of Houghton, 3rd Baron Walpole of Walpole	Maria Walpole; 1725–1801	Horatio Walpole "the Younger"; 1723–1809; 1st Earl of Orford, 4th Baron Walpole of Walpole, 2nd Baron Walpole of Wolterton
Earldom of Orford (2nd creation) extinct, 1797
Francis Russell; 1739–1767 styled Marquess of Tavistock	George Walpole; 1730–1791; 3rd Earl of Orford, Viscount Walpole, and Baron Walpole of Houghton, 2nd Baron Walpole of Walpole
Francis Russell; 1765–1802; 5th Duke of Bedford, Marquess of Tavistock, and Baron Howland; 9th Earl of Bedford and Baron Russell, 7th Baron Russell of Thornhaugh, 7th Baron Russell of Thornhaugh	John Russell; 1766–1839; 6th Duke of Bedford, Marquess of Tavistock, and Baron Howland; 10th Earl of Bedford and Baron Russell, 8th Baron Russell of Thornhaugh	William Russell; 1767–1840	Sophia Churchill d. 1797	Horatio Walpole; 1752–1822; 2nd Earl of Orford, 5th Baron Walpole of Walpole, 3rd Baron Walpole of Wolterton
Earl Russell and Viscount Amberley, 1861
Francis Russell; 1788–1861; 7th Duke of Bedford, Marquess of Tavistock, and Baron Howland; 11th Earl of Bedford and Baron Russell, 9th Baron Russell of Thornhaugh	George William Russell; 1790–1846	John Russell; 1792–1878; 1st Earl Russell	Horatio Walpole; 1783–1858; 3rd Earl of Orford, 6th Baron Walpole of Walpole, 4th Baron Walpole of Wolterton
Baron Ampthill, 1881
William Russell; 1809–1872; 8th Duke of Bedford, Marquess of Tavistock, and Baron Howland; 12th Earl of Bedford and Baron Russell, 10th Baron Russell of Thornhaugh	Francis Charles Hastings Russell; 1819–1891; 9th Duke of Bedford, Marquess of Tavistock, and Baron Howland; 13th Earl of Bedford and Baron Russell, 11th Baron Russell of Thornhaugh	Odo William Leopold Russell; 1829–1884; 1st Baron Ampthill	John Russell; 1842–1876; Viscount Amberley	Horatio Walpole; 1813–1858; 4th Earl of Orford, 7th Baron Walpole of Walpole, 5th Baron Walpole of Wolterton	Robert Walpole; 1854–1931; 5th Earl of Orford, 8th Baron Walpole of Walpole, 6th Baron Walpole of Wolterton
Earldom of Orford (3rd creation) extinct, 1931
George William Francis Sackville Russell; 1852–1893; 10th Duke of Bedford, Marquess of Tavistock, and Baron Howland; 14th Earl of Bedford and Baron Russell, 12th Baron Russell of Thornhaugh	Herbrand Arthur Russell; 1858–1940; 11th Duke of Bedford, Marquess of Tavistock, and Baron Howland; 15th Earl of Bedford and Baron Russell, 13th Baron Russell of Thornhaugh	John Francis Stanley Russell; 1865–1931; 2nd Earl Russell	Bertrand Arthur William Russell; 1872–1970; 3rd Earl Russell
Hastings William Sackville Russell; 1888–1953; 12th Duke of Bedford, Marquess of Tavistock, and Baron Howland; 16th Earl of Bedford and Baron Russell, 14th Baron Russell of Thornhaugh
John Ian Robert Russell; 1917–2002; 13th Duke of Bedford, Marquess of Tavistock, and Baron Howland; 17th Earl of Bedford and Baron Russell, 15th Baron Russell of Thornhaugh	John Conrad Russell; 1921–1987; 4th Earl Russell	Conrad Sebastian Robert Russell; 1937–2004; 5th Earl Russell
Henry Robin Ian Russell; 1940–2003; 14th Duke of Bedford, Marquess of Tavistock, and Baron Howland; 18th Earl of Bedford and Baron Russell, 16th Baron Russell of Thornhaugh
Andrew Ian Henry Russell; 15th Duke of Bedford, Marquess of Tavistock, and Baron Howland; 19th Earl of Bedford and Baron Russell, 17th Baron Russell of Thornhaugh b. 1962	Nicholas Lyulph Russell; 1968–2014; 6th Earl Russell	John Francis Russell b. 1971; 7th Earl Russell
Henry Robin Charles Russell b. 2005 styled Marquess of Tavistock
