= Earl Russell =

Earldom in the Peerage of the United Kingdom

- Arms: Argent, a lion rampant gules armed and langued azure on a chief sable three escallops of the first, the escallop in middle chief charged with a mullet sable; Crest: A Goat statant Argent, armed and unguled Or, charged with a Mullet for difference; Supporters: Dexter: A Lion Gules, charged on the shoulder with a Mullet for difference; Sinister: An Heraldic Antelope Gules, armed, unguled, tufted, ducally gorged and chained Or, the chain refleced over the back, charged on the shoulder with a Mullet for difference. (Arms of the Duke of Bedford differenced in the manner appropriate to a third son)
- Creation date: 30 July 1861
- Creation: First
- Created by: Queen Victoria
- Peerage: Peerage of the United Kingdom
- First holder: John Russell, 1st Earl Russell
- Present holder: John Francis Russell, 7th Earl Russell
- Remainder to: the 1st Earl's heirs male of the body lawfully begotten
- Subsidiary titles: Viscount Amberley
- Status: Extant
- Motto: CHE SERA SERA (What will be, will be)

Earl Russell, of Kingston Russell in the County of Dorset, is a title in the Peerage of the United Kingdom. It was created on 30 July 1861 for the prominent Liberal politician Lord John Russell. He was Home Secretary from 1835 to 1839, Foreign Secretary from 1852 to 1853 and 1859 to 1865 and Prime Minister of the United Kingdom from 1846 to 1852 and 1865 to 1866. At the same time as he was given the earldom of Russell, he was made Viscount Amberley, of Amberley in the County of Gloucester and of Ardsalla in the County of Meath. A member of the prominent Russell family, he was the third son of John Russell, 6th Duke of Bedford.

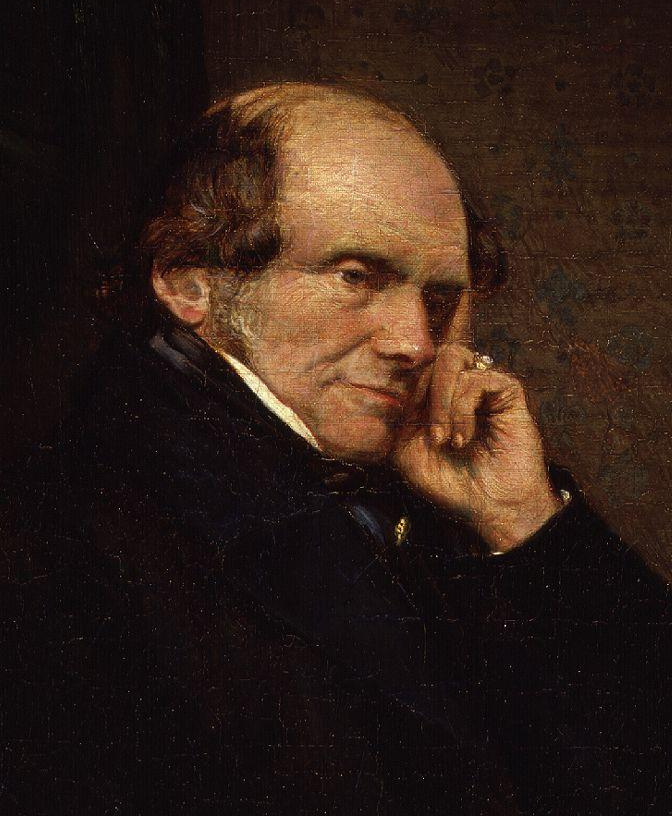
John Russell, 1st Earl Russell

The first Earl was succeeded by his grandson the second Earl, the eldest son of John Russell, Viscount Amberley. He was one of the first peers to join the Labour Party and he held office under Prime Minister Ramsay MacDonald as Under-Secretary of State for India from 1929 to 1931. He was childless and was succeeded in 1931 by his younger brother, the third Earl, the famous philosopher and Nobel Prize winner universally known as Bertrand Russell. When he died in 1970 his eldest son, the fourth Earl held the title until his half-brother, the fifth Earl inherited it in 1987. He was a noted historian of 17th century England. Russell also sat on the Liberal Democrat benches in the House of Lords and was one of the ninety elected hereditary peers that were allowed to remain in the House of Lords after the passing of the House of Lords Act 1999. As of 2018 the titles are held by his youngest son, the seventh Earl, who succeeded his brother in 2014.

As descendants of the sixth Duke of Bedford, the Earls Russell are also in remainder to that peerage and its subsidiary titles.

In 2026, the 7th earl was created Baron Russell of Forest Hill for life. This will allow him to continue to sit in the House of Lords after the House of Lords (Hereditary Peers) Act 2026 comes into force.

== Earls Russell (1861) ==
- John Russell, 1st Earl Russell (1792–1878)
- John Francis Stanley Russell, 2nd Earl Russell (1865–1931)
- Bertrand Arthur William Russell, 3rd Earl Russell (1872–1970)
- John Conrad Russell, 4th Earl Russell (1921–1987)
- Conrad Sebastian Robert Russell, 5th Earl Russell (1937–2004)
- Nicholas Lyulph Russell, 6th Earl Russell (1968–2014)
- John Francis Russell, 7th Earl Russell (b. 1971)

There is no-one entitled to succeed to the earldom.

== Family tree ==
Family tree of the Earls of Bedford, Dukes of Bedford, Earls of Orford, and Earls Russell

King Edward III; 1312–1377
John of Gaunt; 1340–1399; Duke of Lancaster
King Henry IV; 1367–1413	Joan Beaufort c. 1379–1440
Duke of Bedford (1st creation), 1414; Duke of Bedford (2nd creation), 1433
King Henry V 1386–1422	John of Lancaster; 1389–1435; Duke of Bedford
Dukedom of Bedford (1st creation) extinct, 1432; Dukedom of Bedford (2nd creation) extinct, 1435
Catherine of Valois; 1401–1437	Owen Tudor; 1400–1461	Cecily Neville; 1415–1495	Richard Neville; 1400–1460; 5th Earl of Salisbury
Duke of Bedford (5th creation), 1485
King Henry VI; 1421–1471	Edmund Tudor c. 1430–1456; 1st Earl of Richmond	Jasper Tudor c. 1431–1495; Duke of Bedford	King Edward IV; 1442–1483	King Richard III; 1452–1485	John Neville c. 1431–1471; 1st Marquess of Montagu
Dukedom of Bedford (5th creation) extinct, 1495
Duke of Bedford (4th creation), 1478	Duke of Bedford (3rd creation), 1470
King Henry VII; 1457–1509	Elizabeth of York; 1466–1503	George Plantagenet; 1477–1479; Duke of Bedford	George Neville c. 1457–1483; Duke of Bedford
Baron Russell of Cheneys, 1539; Earl of Bedford (3rd creation), 1551	Dukedom of Bedford (4th creation) extinct, 1479	Dukedom of Bedford (3rd creation) extinct, 1478
John Russell c. 1485–1555; 1st Earl of Bedford, etc.
Francis Russell; 1527–1585; 2nd Earl of Bedford, etc.
Baron Russell of Thornhaugh, 1603
Edward Russell; 1551–1572 styled Lord Russell	John Russell c. 1553–1584 styled Lord Russell	Francis Russell c. 1554–1585 styled Lord Russell	William Russell c. 1558–1613; 1st Baron Russell of Thornhaugh
Edward Russell; 1572–1627; 3rd Earl of Bedford, etc.	Francis Russell; 1593–1641; 4th Earl of Bedford, etc. 2nd Baron Russell of Thornhaugh
Duke of Bedford (6th creation) and Marquess of Tavistock, 1694; Baron Howland of Streatham, 1695
William Russell; 1616–1700; 1st Duke of Bedford, etc., 5th Earl of Bedford, etc. 3rd Baron Russell of Thornhaugh	Edward Russell; 1626–1665
Earl of Orford (1st creation), Viscount Barfleur and Baron of Shingay, in the County of Cambridge, 1697
Francis Russell; 1638–1679; Lord Russell	William Russell; 1639–1683; Lord Russell	Margaret Russell; 1656–1702	Edward Russell; 1652–1727; Earl of Orford, etc.	The Russell and Walpole families are not related, but have both held the Earldom of Orford.	Robert Walpole; 1650–1700
Attainted, 1683	Earldom of Orford (1st creation) and subsidiary titles extinct, 1727
Earl of Orford (2nd creation), Viscount Walpole and Baron Walpole of Houghton in the County of Norfolk, 1742	Baron Walpole of Wolterton in the County of Norfolk
Wriothesley Russell; 1680–1711; 2nd Duke of Bedford, etc., 5th Earl of Bedford, etc. 6th Baron Russell of Thornhaugh	Robert Walpole; 1676–1745; 1st Earl of Orford, etc.	Horatio Walpole; 1678–1757; 1st Baron Walpole of Wolterton
Baron Walpole of Walpole in the County of Norfolk	Earl of Orford (3rd creation), 1806
Wriothesley Russell; 1708–1732; 3rd Duke of Bedford, etc., 5th Earl of Bedford, etc. 7th Baron Russell of Thornhaugh	John Russell; 1710–1771; 4th Duke of Bedford, etc., 8th Earl of Bedford, etc. 6th Baron Russell of Thornhaugh	Robert Walpole; 1701–1751; 2nd Earl of Orford, etc., 1st Baron Walpole of Walpole	Horace Walpole "Horatio"; 1717–1797; 4th Earl of Orford, etc., 3rd Baron Walpole of Walpole	Maria Walpole; 1725–1801	Horatio Walpole "the Younger"; 1723–1809; 1st Earl of Orford, 4th Baron Walpole of Walpole, 2nd Baron Walpole of Wolterton
Earldom of Orford (2nd creation) and subsidiary titles extinct, 1797
Francis Russell; 1739–1767 styled Marquess of Tavistock	George Walpole; 1730–1791; 3rd Earl of Orford, etc., 2nd Baron Walpole of Walpole
Francis Russell; 1765–1802; 5th Duke of Bedford, etc., 9th Earl of Bedford, etc. 7th Baron Russell of Thornhaugh	John Russell; 1766–1839; 6th Duke of Bedford, etc., 10th Earl of Bedford, etc. 8th Baron Russell of Thornhaugh	William Russell; 1767–1840	Sophia Churchill d. 1797	Horatio Walpole; 1752–1822; 2nd Earl of Orford, 5th Baron Walpole of Walpole, 3rd Baron Walpole of Wolterton
Earl Russell and Viscount Amberley, 1861
Francis Russell; 1788–1861; 7th Duke of Bedford, etc., 11th Earl of Bedford, etc. 9th Baron Russell of Thornhaugh	George William Russell; 1790–1846	John Russell; 1792–1878; 1st Earl Russell, etc.	Horatio Walpole; 1783–1858; 3rd Earl of Orford, 6th Baron Walpole of Walpole, 4th Baron Walpole of Wolterton
Baron Ampthill, 1881
William Russell; 1809–1872; 8th Duke of Bedford, etc., 12th Earl of Bedford, etc. 10th Baron Russell of Thornhaugh	Francis Charles Hastings Russell; 1819–1891; 9th Duke of Bedford, etc., 13th Earl of Bedford, etc. 11th Baron Russell of Thornhaugh	Odo William Leopold Russell; 1829–1884; 1st Baron Ampthill	John Russell; 1842–1876 styled Viscount Amberley	Horatio Walpole; 1813–1894; 4th Earl of Orford, 7th Baron Walpole of Walpole, 5th Baron Walpole of Wolterton	Robert Walpole; 1854–1931; 5th Earl of Orford, 8th Baron Walpole of Walpole, 6th Baron Walpole of Wolterton
Earldom of Orford (3rd creation) extinct, 1931
George William Francis Sackville Russell; 1852–1893; 10th Duke of Bedford, etc., 14th Earl of Bedford, etc. 12th Baron Russell of Thornhaugh	Herbrand Arthur Russell; 1858–1940; 11th Duke of Bedford, etc., 15th Earl of Bedford, etc. 13th Baron Russell of Thornhaugh	John Francis Stanley Russell; 1865–1931; 2nd Earl Russell, etc.	Bertrand Arthur William Russell; 1872–1970; 3rd Earl Russell, etc.
Hastings William Sackville Russell; 1888–1953; 12th Duke of Bedford, etc., 16th Earl of Bedford, etc. 14th Baron Russell of Thornhaugh
John Ian Robert Russell; 1917–2002; 13th Duke of Bedford, etc., 17th Earl of Bedford, etc. 15th Baron Russell of Thornhaugh	John Conrad Russell; 1921–1987; 4th Earl Russell, etc.	Conrad Sebastian Robert Russell; 1937–2004; 5th Earl Russell, etc.
Henry Robin Ian Russell; 1940–2003; 14th Duke of Bedford, etc., 18th Earl of Bedford, etc. 16th Baron Russell of Thornhaugh
Baron Russell of Forest Hill, 2026 (for life)
Andrew Ian Henry Russell; 15th Duke of Bedford, etc., 19th Earl of Bedford, etc. 17th Baron Russell of Thornhaugh b. 1962	Nicholas Lyulph Russell; 1968–2014; 6th Earl Russell, etc.	John Francis Russell b. 1971; 7th Earl Russell, etc., Baron Russell of Forest Hill
There are no heirs to the Russell earldom.
Henry Robin Charles Russell b. 2005 styled Marquess of Tavistock
Heir to the Bedford dukedom and its subsidiary titles

== See also ==
- Duke of Bedford
- Earl of Orford
- Baron Ampthill
