= Duke of Bedford =

Title in the Peerage of England

Dukedom of Bedford
- Argent, a lion rampant gules on a chief sable three escallops of the first (Russell).
- Creation date: 11 May 1694
- Creation: Sixth
- Created by: William III and Mary II
- Peerage: Peerage of England
- First holder: William Russell, 5th Earl of Bedford
- Present holder: Andrew Russell, 15th Duke
- Heir apparent: Henry Russell, Marquess of Tavistock
- Remainder to: 1st Duke's heirs male of the body lawfully begotten
- Subsidiary titles: Marquess of Tavistock; Earl of Bedford; Baron Russell; Baron Russell of Thornhaugh; Baron Howland
- Seat: Woburn Abbey

Duke of Bedford (named after Bedford, England) is a title that has been created six times (for five distinct people) in the Peerage of England. The first creation came in 1414 for Henry IV's third son, John of Lancaster, who later served as regent of France. In 1433 he surrendered the title and it was re-granted to him. The title became extinct on his death in 1435. The third creation came in 1470 in favour of George Neville, nephew of Warwick the Kingmaker. He was deprived of the title by an act of Parliament in 1478. The fourth creation came in 1478 in favour of George, the third son of Edward IV. He died the following year at the age of two. The fifth creation came in 1485 in favour of Jasper Tudor, half-brother of Henry VI and uncle of Henry VII. He had already been created Earl of Pembroke in 1452. However, as he was a Lancastrian, his title was forfeited between 1461 and 1485 during the predominance of the House of York. He regained the earldom in 1485 when his nephew Henry VII came to the throne and was elevated to the dukedom the same year. He had no legitimate children and the titles became extinct on his death in 1495.

John Russell, a close adviser of Henry VIII and Edward VI, was granted the title of Earl of Bedford in 1551, and his descendant William, 5th Earl, was created Duke in 1694, following the Glorious Revolution. The Russell family currently holds the titles of Earl and Duke of Bedford.

The subsidiary titles of the Duke of Bedford, all in the Peerage of England, are Marquess of Tavistock (created 1694), Earl of Bedford (1550), Baron Russell, of Cheneys (1539), Baron Russell of Thornhaugh in the County of Northampton (1603), and Baron Howland, of Streatham in the County of Surrey (1695). The courtesy title of the Duke of Bedford's eldest son and heir is Marquess of Tavistock.

== Estates and residences ==
=== Country seat ===
The family seat is Woburn Abbey, Bedfordshire. The private mausoleum and chapel of the Russell family and the dukes of Bedford is at St. Michael's Church in Chenies, Buckinghamshire (photo). The family owns the Bedford Estate in central London.

=== Estates ===
In the 1883 edition of John Bateman's The Great Landowners of Great Britain and Ireland, Francis Russell, 9th Duke of Bedford's estates were recorded as spanning 86,335 acres across England, including 32,269 acres in Bedfordshire, 22,607 acres in Devon, 18,800 acres in Cambridgeshire, 3,414 acres in Northamptonshire, 3,412 acres in Dorset, 3,036 acres in Buckinghamshire, 1,334 acres in Huntingdonshire, 1,231 acres in Cornwall, 148 acres in Hampshire, 83 acres in Hertfordshire, and 1 acre in Lincolnshire, which produced a combined annual income of £141,793. Bateman noted that the total annual income figure cited did not include revenues from the Duke's extensive London properties which formed the Bedford Estate.

Following the death of Herbrand Russell, 11th Duke of Bedford in 1940, he was succeeded by his only child Hastings Russell, 12th Duke of Bedford. The 11th Duke's personal estate was valued at £1,412,241 for probate, upon which £816,764 of death duties were levied. A further grant of probate in respect of settled lands was valued at £3,239,130 in December 1940, upon which over £2,000,000 in death duties were paid in the years following his death. The 12th Duke was quoted in the Daily Mirror in February 1941 as stating that wartime taxation had reduced his income to one quarter of that which had been enjoyed by his father. In a 1959 newspaper article published in the Liverpool Daily Post authored by the 11th Duke's grandson, Ian Russell, 13th Duke of Bedford, the 13th Duke stated that although the value of his grandfather's estate had dropped drastically as a result of the Second World War, the 11th Duke's total estate was valued at £4,651,371 for probate, upon which £3,100,000 in estate tax was levied, and that this amount was still being paid off when he succeeded to the Dukedom in 1953.

Following the death of the 12th Duke in 1953, his personal estate was valued at £802,252 gross, with a net value of £702,252 in November 1953, upon which £530,301 in death duties were levied. A further grant of probate with respect to settled land in which the Duke held a life interest was issued in December of the same year, with a valuation of £4,990,000. The 13th Duke later authored a newspaper article in The Evening Standard in 1956 in which he stated that the death duties levied on his father's estate amounted to nearly £5,000,000.

=== London residences ===
The London residence of the Earls of Bedford from the 1580s to the late 1600s was Bedford House, Strand. During the 1700s the London residence of the family was Bedford House in Bloomsbury Square; previously known as Southampton House until 1734, the property and surrounding estates had been inherited by Wriothesley Russell, 2nd Duke of Bedford from his mother, Rachel Russell, Lady Russell, daughter of Thomas Wriothesley, 4th Earl of Southampton. The house was not favoured by Francis Russell, 5th Duke of Bedford, who succeeded in 1786, and in 1800 the 5th Duke authorised the demolition of the family's mansion in Bloomsbury Square.

In 1823 his brother John Russell, 6th Duke of Bedford leased a house on Campden Hill in Kensington for £5,250; initially a modest regency villa, the Duke employed Sir Jeffry Wyatville to enlarge the villa, which became known as Bedford Lodge. Following the significant extension of the house, it eventually attracted a higher valuation for rating purposes than Holland House. After the 6th Duke died in 1839, his widow continued to live at the property until her own death in 1853, after which the lease of Bedford Lodge was sold to George Campbell, 8th Duke of Argyll; the house was subsequently known as Argyll Lodge.

By September 1840 Francis Russell, 7th Duke of Bedford had leased No. 6 Belgrave Square; during his tenancy the house was sometimes referred to as Bedford House, Belgrave Square. His wife Anna Russell, Duchess of Bedford died at the house in July 1857. In 1861 their only son William Russell, 8th Duke of Bedford succeeded to the Dukedom, and he continued to use No. 6 Belgrave Square as his London residence, where he later died on 26 May 1872.

As the 8th Duke died unmarried and childless, he was succeeded by his cousin Francis Russell, 9th Duke of Bedford. In his will the 8th Duke had bequeathed his interest in all of his property in Middlesex to his successor; despite this, the 9th Duke did not take up residence at No. 6 Belgrave Square, and instead purchased the leasehold of No. 81 Eaton Square as his London residence in July 1872.

No. 81 Eaton Square continued to be the family's London house until the death of the 9th Duke, who shot himself at the house in January 1891. His elder son George Russell, 10th Duke of Bedford died unexpectedly at his London home, No. 37 Chesham Place in 1893, and he was succeeded by his younger brother Herbrand Russell, 11th Duke of Bedford. The 11th Duke and Duchess leased No. 15 Belgrave Square as their London residence from late 1893, which remained as the family's London residence until the 1940s. During the early 1900s, the 11th Duke also acquired the leasehold of the neighbouring house at No. 16 Belgrave Square; both No. 15 and 16 were listed as his London residence in 1914 and 1927.

15 Belgrave Square was the London address of the 11th Duke's only child Hastings Russell, Marquess of Tavistock in March 1940, who succeeded as 12th Duke of Bedford upon his father's death in August that year. Both 15 and 16 Belgrave Square were requisitioned by the British government during World War II, and continued to be so in January 1946, at which time the 12th Duke was recorded as continuing to own the leasehold of both houses.

== Duke of Bedford, first creation (1414) ==
Other titles: Earl of Kendal (1414) and Earl of Richmond (1414)

- John of Lancaster, Duke of Bedford (1389–1435), third son of Henry IV

== Duke of Bedford, second creation (1433) ==
Other titles: Earl of Kendal (1414) and Earl of Richmond (1414)

- John of Lancaster, Duke of Bedford (1389–1435), regranted his dukedom with the standard remainder, died without issue

== Duke of Bedford, third creation (1470) ==
Other titles: Marquess of Montagu (1470) and Baron Montagu (1461)

- George Neville, Duke of Bedford (1465–1483), nephew of Warwick the Kingmaker, succeeded as Marquess of Montagu and Baron Montagu in 1471, deprived of all of his honours in 1478

== Duke of Bedford, fourth creation (1478) ==
- George Plantagenet, Duke of Bedford (1477–1479), third son of Edward IV, died in infancy

== Duke of Bedford, fifth creation (1485) ==
Other titles: Earl of Pembroke (1452)

- Jasper Tudor, Duke of Bedford (1431–1495), uncle of Henry VII, regained his earldom a few months after his nephew's accession. He died without legitimate issue.

== Duke of Bedford, sixth creation ==
=== Earl of Bedford (1551) ===
Other titles: Baron Russell (1539)

- John Russell, 1st Earl of Bedford (c. 1485–1555), a close advisor of Henry VIII, was later created Earl of Bedford, by then a close advisor of Henry's son Edward VI, was further honoured by him
- Francis Russell, 2nd Earl of Bedford (1527–1585), son of the 1st Earl
  - Edward Russell, Lord Russell (1551–1572), eldest son of the 2nd Earl
  - John Russell, 3rd Baron Russell (c. 1553–1584), second son of the 2nd Earl, summoned to Parliament by writ of acceleration
  - Francis Russell, Lord Russell (c. 1554–1585), third son of the 2nd Earl
  - William Russell, 1st Baron Russell of Thornhaugh (c. 1557–1613), fourth son of the 2nd Earl
- Edward Russell, 3rd Earl of Bedford (1572–1627), son of Francis, Lord Russell

Other titles (4th Earl onwards): Baron Russell of Thornhaugh (1603)

- Francis Russell, 4th Earl of Bedford (1593–1641), cousin of the 3rd Earl and son of Lord Russell of Thornhaugh (fourth son of the 2nd Earl)
- William Russell, 5th Earl of Bedford (1616–1700), eldest son of the 4th Earl, was created Duke of Bedford in 1694
  - Francis Russell, Lord Russell (1638–1679), eldest son of the 5th Earl, died unmarried
  - Rt. Hon. William Russell, Lord Russell (1639–1683), second son of the 5th Earl, father of the 2nd Duke, was attainted and executed in 1683

=== Origins ===
John Russell was born c. 1485 probably at Berwick-by-Swyre, Dorset, the son of Sir James Russell (died November 1505) and his first wife Alice Wyse, daughter of Thomas Wyse of Sidenham, near Tavistock, Devon. James's father was possibly Sir William Russell, but more likely his brother John Russell (died before November 1505) by his wife Alice Froxmere, daughter of John Froxmere of Droitwich, Worcestershire, because his coat of arms quarters Froxmere. The elder John Russell was the son of Sir Henry Russell (d. 1463/4), and Elizabeth Herring, daughter of John Herring of Chaldon Herring. Henry, a great-grandfather of the 1st earl, was a substantial wine merchant and shipper, who represented Weymouth in the House of Commons four times.

The Russell pedigree can only be traced back with certainty to Henry Russell's father, Sir Stephen Russell, the evidence being contained in a deed of April 1440 in which Henry Russell made over to his daughter Christina and her husband Walter Cheverell of Chauntemarle, a tenement in Dorchester to be held of himself and his heirs upon the rent of a red rose. In the deed, Henry referred to himself as "son and heir of Sir Stephen Russell and of Alice, his wife". This Alice appears to have been the heir general of the De la Tour family, which had long owned Berwick-by-Swyre, and by whom therefore the manor was brought into the Russell family.

Both Sir Henry and Sir Stephen were referred to as Gascoigne as well as Russell, possibly due to their wine trade with France (see Gascoigne), as in a 1442 pardon under the Privy Seal referring to "Henry Russell of Weymouth, merchant, alias Henry Gascoign, gentleman". It was long believed in the noble Russell family, certainly by the 2nd Earl of Bedford, that the family was descended from the ancient family of Russell of Kingston Russell in Dorset, three miles north-east of Berwick, which descent was declared unproven by Gladys Scott Thomson in her Two Centuries of Family History (London, 1930) a work on the early pedigree of the Earls of Bedford. (Note: The error is repeated in the Dictionary of National Biography) (For a disambiguation of the Bedford Russells and the Russells of Kingston Russell, see Kingston Russell House.)

=== Duke of Bedford (1694) ===
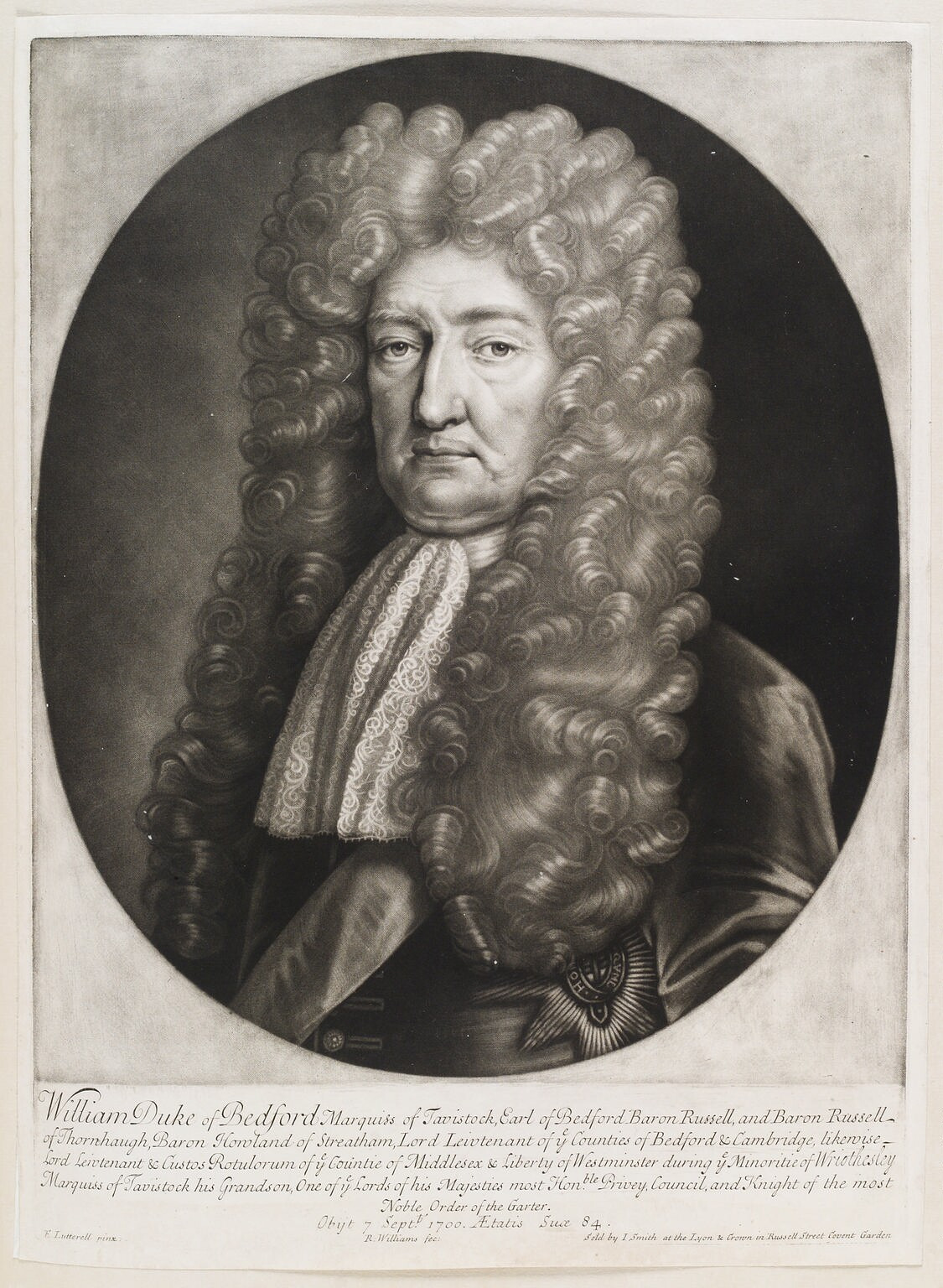
William Russell, 1st Duke of Bedford

Other titles: Marquess of Tavistock (1694), Baron Howland (1695), Earl of Bedford (1551), Baron Russell (1538) and Baron Russell of Thornhaugh (1603)

- William Russell, 1st Duke of Bedford (1616–1700), was created Duke of Bedford in 1694, after the Glorious Revolution
  - Francis Russell, Lord Russell (1638–1679), eldest son of the 1st Duke, died unmarried
  - Rt. Hon. William Russell, Lord Russell (1639–1683), second son of the 1st Duke
- Wriothesley Russell, 2nd Duke of Bedford (1680–1711), only son of Rt. Hon. William Russell, Lord Russell (whose attainder had been reversed in 1688)
  - William Russell, Marquess of Tavistock (1703), eldest son of the 2nd Duke, died in infancy
  - William Russell, Marquess of Tavistock (1704–c. 1707), second son of the 2nd Duke, died young
- Wriothesley Russell, 3rd Duke of Bedford (1708–1732), third son of the 2nd Duke, died without issue
- John Russell, 4th Duke of Bedford (1710–1771), fourth and youngest son of the 2nd Duke
  - John Russell, Marquess of Tavistock (1732–1732), eldest son of the 4th Duke, died in infancy
  - Francis Russell, Marquess of Tavistock (1739–1767), second son of the 4th Duke and father of the 5th and 6th Dukes
- Francis Russell, 5th Duke of Bedford (1765–1802), eldest son of Lord Tavistock, died without issue
- John Russell, 6th Duke of Bedford (1766–1839), second son of Lord Tavistock
- Francis Russell, 7th Duke of Bedford (1788–1861), eldest son of the 6th Duke
- William Russell, 8th Duke of Bedford (1809–1872), only son of the 7th Duke, died unmarried
- Francis Charles Hastings Russell, 9th Duke of Bedford (1819–1891), eldest son of Maj.-Gen. Lord George Russell, second son of the 6th Duke
- George William Francis Sackville Russell, 10th Duke of Bedford (1852–1893), eldest son of the 9th Duke, died without legitimate issue.
- Herbrand Arthur Russell, 11th Duke of Bedford (1858–1940), second son of the 9th Duke
- Hastings William Sackville Russell, 12th Duke of Bedford (1888–1953), only son of the 11th Duke
- John Ian Robert Russell, 13th Duke of Bedford (1917–2002), eldest son of the 12th Duke
- Henry Robin Ian Russell, 14th Duke of Bedford (1940–2003), eldest son of the 13th Duke
- Andrew Ian Henry Russell, 15th Duke of Bedford (born 1962), eldest son of the 14th Duke

The heir apparent is the present holder's only son, Henry Robin Charles Russell, Marquess of Tavistock (b. 2005).

=== Line of succession (simplified) ===
Line of succession (simplified)
- John Russell, 6th Duke of Bedford (1766–1839)
  - Francis Russell, 7th Duke of Bedford (1788–1861)
    - William Russell, 8th Duke of Bedford (1809–1872)
  - Lord George William Russell (1790–1846)
    - (Francis) Hastings Russell, 9th Duke of Bedford (1819–1891)
      - George Russell, 10th Duke of Bedford (1852–1893)
      - Herbrand Russell, 11th Duke of Bedford (1858–1940)
        - Hastings Russell, 12th Duke of Bedford (1888–1953)
          - Ian Russell, 13th Duke of Bedford (1917–2002)
            - Robin Russell, 14th Duke of Bedford (1940–2003)
              - Andrew Russell, 15th Duke of Bedford (born 1962)
                - (1). Henry Robin Charles Russell, Marquess of Tavistock (born 2005)
              - (2). Lord Robin Loel Hastings Russell (born 1963)
              - (3). Lord James Edward Herbrand Russell (born 1975)
                - (4). Alexander Charles Robin Russell (born 2010)
                - (5). Leo William Caspar Russell (born 2013)
            - (6). Lord Rudolf Russell (born 1944)
            - (7). Lord Francis Hastings Russell (born 1950)
              - (8). John Francis Russell (born 1997)
              - (9). Harry Evelyn Terence Russell (born 1999)
          - Lord Hugh Hastings Russell (1923–2005)
            - male issue in line
    - Lord Arthur John Edward Russell (1825–1892)
      - Harold John Hastings Russell (1868–1926)
        - Anthony Arthur Russell (1904–1978)
          - male issue in line
      - Gilbert Byng Alwyne Russell (1875–1942)
        - Martin Basil Paul Russell (1918–2003)
          - male issue in line
    - Odo Russell, 1st Baron Ampthill (1829–1884)
      - Barons Ampthill
  - John Russell, 1st Earl Russell (1792–1878)
    - Earls Russell
  - Lord Charles James Fox Russell (1807–1894)
    - Henry Charles Russell (1842–1922)
      - Sir Thomas Wentworth Russell (1879–1954)
        - Sir John Wriothesley Russell (1914–1984)
          - male issue in line

== Family trees ==
Family tree of the Earls of Bedford, Dukes of Bedford, Earls of Orford, and Earls Russell

King Edward III; 1312–1377
John of Gaunt; 1340–1399; Duke of Lancaster
King Henry IV; 1367–1413	Joan Beaufort c. 1379–1440
Duke of Bedford (1st creation), 1414; Duke of Bedford (2nd creation), 1433
King Henry V 1386–1422	John of Lancaster; 1389–1435; Duke of Bedford
Dukedom of Bedford (1st creation) extinct, 1432; Dukedom of Bedford (2nd creation) extinct, 1435
Catherine of Valois; 1401–1437	Owen Tudor; 1400–1461	Cecily Neville; 1415–1495	Richard Neville; 1400–1460; 5th Earl of Salisbury
Duke of Bedford (5th creation), 1485
King Henry VI; 1421–1471	Edmund Tudor c. 1430–1456; 1st Earl of Richmond	Jasper Tudor c. 1431–1495; Duke of Bedford	King Edward IV; 1442–1483	King Richard III; 1452–1485	John Neville c. 1431–1471; 1st Marquess of Montagu
Dukedom of Bedford (5th creation) extinct, 1495
Duke of Bedford (4th creation), 1478	Duke of Bedford (3rd creation), 1470
King Henry VII; 1457–1509	Elizabeth of York; 1466–1503	George Plantagenet; 1477–1479; Duke of Bedford	George Neville c. 1457–1483; Duke of Bedford
Baron Russell of Cheneys, 1539; Earl of Bedford (3rd creation), 1551	Dukedom of Bedford (4th creation) extinct, 1479	Dukedom of Bedford (3rd creation) extinct, 1478
John Russell c. 1485–1555; 1st Earl of Bedford, etc.
Francis Russell; 1527–1585; 2nd Earl of Bedford, etc.
Baron Russell of Thornhaugh, 1603
Edward Russell; 1551–1572 styled Lord Russell	John Russell c. 1553–1584 styled Lord Russell	Francis Russell c. 1554–1585 styled Lord Russell	William Russell c. 1558–1613; 1st Baron Russell of Thornhaugh
Edward Russell; 1572–1627; 3rd Earl of Bedford, etc.	Francis Russell; 1593–1641; 4th Earl of Bedford, etc. 2nd Baron Russell of Thornhaugh
Duke of Bedford (6th creation) and Marquess of Tavistock, 1694; Baron Howland of Streatham, 1695
William Russell; 1616–1700; 1st Duke of Bedford, etc., 5th Earl of Bedford, etc. 3rd Baron Russell of Thornhaugh	Edward Russell; 1626–1665
Earl of Orford (1st creation), Viscount Barfleur and Baron of Shingay, in the County of Cambridge, 1697
Francis Russell; 1638–1679; Lord Russell	William Russell; 1639–1683; Lord Russell	Margaret Russell; 1656–1702	Edward Russell; 1652–1727; Earl of Orford, etc.	The Russell and Walpole families are not related, but have both held the Earldom of Orford.	Robert Walpole; 1650–1700
Attainted, 1683	Earldom of Orford (1st creation) and subsidiary titles extinct, 1727
Earl of Orford (2nd creation), Viscount Walpole and Baron Walpole of Houghton in the County of Norfolk, 1742	Baron Walpole of Wolterton in the County of Norfolk
Wriothesley Russell; 1680–1711; 2nd Duke of Bedford, etc., 5th Earl of Bedford, etc. 6th Baron Russell of Thornhaugh	Robert Walpole; 1676–1745; 1st Earl of Orford, etc.	Horatio Walpole; 1678–1757; 1st Baron Walpole of Wolterton
Baron Walpole of Walpole in the County of Norfolk	Earl of Orford (3rd creation), 1806
Wriothesley Russell; 1708–1732; 3rd Duke of Bedford, etc., 5th Earl of Bedford, etc. 7th Baron Russell of Thornhaugh	John Russell; 1710–1771; 4th Duke of Bedford, etc., 8th Earl of Bedford, etc. 6th Baron Russell of Thornhaugh	Robert Walpole; 1701–1751; 2nd Earl of Orford, etc., 1st Baron Walpole of Walpole	Horace Walpole "Horatio"; 1717–1797; 4th Earl of Orford, etc., 3rd Baron Walpole of Walpole	Maria Walpole; 1725–1801	Horatio Walpole "the Younger"; 1723–1809; 1st Earl of Orford, 4th Baron Walpole of Walpole, 2nd Baron Walpole of Wolterton
Earldom of Orford (2nd creation) and subsidiary titles extinct, 1797
Francis Russell; 1739–1767 styled Marquess of Tavistock	George Walpole; 1730–1791; 3rd Earl of Orford, etc., 2nd Baron Walpole of Walpole
Francis Russell; 1765–1802; 5th Duke of Bedford, etc., 9th Earl of Bedford, etc. 7th Baron Russell of Thornhaugh	John Russell; 1766–1839; 6th Duke of Bedford, etc., 10th Earl of Bedford, etc. 8th Baron Russell of Thornhaugh	William Russell; 1767–1840	Sophia Churchill d. 1797	Horatio Walpole; 1752–1822; 2nd Earl of Orford, 5th Baron Walpole of Walpole, 3rd Baron Walpole of Wolterton
Earl Russell and Viscount Amberley, 1861
Francis Russell; 1788–1861; 7th Duke of Bedford, etc., 11th Earl of Bedford, etc. 9th Baron Russell of Thornhaugh	George William Russell; 1790–1846	John Russell; 1792–1878; 1st Earl Russell, etc.	Horatio Walpole; 1783–1858; 3rd Earl of Orford, 6th Baron Walpole of Walpole, 4th Baron Walpole of Wolterton
Baron Ampthill, 1881
William Russell; 1809–1872; 8th Duke of Bedford, etc., 12th Earl of Bedford, etc. 10th Baron Russell of Thornhaugh	Francis Charles Hastings Russell; 1819–1891; 9th Duke of Bedford, etc., 13th Earl of Bedford, etc. 11th Baron Russell of Thornhaugh	Odo William Leopold Russell; 1829–1884; 1st Baron Ampthill	John Russell; 1842–1876 styled Viscount Amberley	Horatio Walpole; 1813–1894; 4th Earl of Orford, 7th Baron Walpole of Walpole, 5th Baron Walpole of Wolterton	Robert Walpole; 1854–1931; 5th Earl of Orford, 8th Baron Walpole of Walpole, 6th Baron Walpole of Wolterton
Earldom of Orford (3rd creation) extinct, 1931
George William Francis Sackville Russell; 1852–1893; 10th Duke of Bedford, etc., 14th Earl of Bedford, etc. 12th Baron Russell of Thornhaugh	Herbrand Arthur Russell; 1858–1940; 11th Duke of Bedford, etc., 15th Earl of Bedford, etc. 13th Baron Russell of Thornhaugh	John Francis Stanley Russell; 1865–1931; 2nd Earl Russell, etc.	Bertrand Arthur William Russell; 1872–1970; 3rd Earl Russell, etc.
Hastings William Sackville Russell; 1888–1953; 12th Duke of Bedford, etc., 16th Earl of Bedford, etc. 14th Baron Russell of Thornhaugh
John Ian Robert Russell; 1917–2002; 13th Duke of Bedford, etc., 17th Earl of Bedford, etc. 15th Baron Russell of Thornhaugh	John Conrad Russell; 1921–1987; 4th Earl Russell, etc.	Conrad Sebastian Robert Russell; 1937–2004; 5th Earl Russell, etc.
Henry Robin Ian Russell; 1940–2003; 14th Duke of Bedford, etc., 18th Earl of Bedford, etc. 16th Baron Russell of Thornhaugh
Baron Russell of Forest Hill, 2026 (for life)
Andrew Ian Henry Russell; 15th Duke of Bedford, etc., 19th Earl of Bedford, etc. 17th Baron Russell of Thornhaugh b. 1962	Nicholas Lyulph Russell; 1968–2014; 6th Earl Russell, etc.	John Francis Russell b. 1971; 7th Earl Russell, etc., Baron Russell of Forest Hill
There are no heirs to the Russell earldom.
Henry Robin Charles Russell b. 2005 styled Marquess of Tavistock
Heir to the Bedford dukedom and its subsidiary titles

Family tree of British royal dukes

Includes dukes of: Albany, Albemarle, Bedford, Cambridge, Clarence, Connaught and Strathearn, Cumberland, Edinburgh, Gloucester, Gloucester and Edinburgh, Hereford, Kent, Kintyre and Lorne, Norfolk, Ross, Somerset, Sussex, Windsor, and York, but only when royally.

Non-royal dukes are not included; see Royal dukedoms in the United Kingdom.
Also not included are titles mandated for use by the heir apparent (Duke of Rothesay and the 1337 creation of the Duke of Cornwall), see Princes of Wales family tree.

King Robert II; 1316–1390	King Edward III; 1312–1377
Duke of Albany (1st creation), 1398	Duke of Clarence (1st creation), 1362	Duke of York (1st creation), 1385
King Robert III c. 1337–1406	Robert Stewart c. 1340–1420; 1st Duke of Albany	Edward the Black Prince; 1330–1376	Lionel of Antwerp; 1338–1368; Duke of Clarence	John of Gaunt; 1340–1399	Edmund; 1341–1402; 1st Duke of York
Dukedom of Clarence (1st creation) extinct, 1368
Duke of Cornwall (2nd creation), 1376	Duke of Hereford, 1397	Duke of Gloucester (1st creation), 1385
Murdoch Stewart c. 1362–1425; 2nd Duke of Albany	Richard of Bordeaux; 1367–1400; Duke of Cornwall, later King Richard II	Henry Bolingbroke; 1367–1413; Duke of Hereford, later King Henry IV	Thomas of Woodstock; 1355–1397; Duke of Gloucester
Dukedom of Albany (1st creation) forfeit, 1425	Dukedom of Cornwall (2nd creation) merged in the crown, 1377	Dukedom of Hereford merged in the crown, 1399	Dukedom of Gloucester (1st creation) extinct, 1397
Duke of Clarence (2nd creation), 1412	Duke of Bedford (1st & 2nd creations), 1414	Duke of Gloucester (2nd creation), 1414	Duke of Albemarle (Aumale) (1st creation), 1397
Thomas of Lancaster; 1387–1421; Duke of Clarence	John of Lancaster; 1389–1435; Duke of Bedford; Surrendered dukedom and then regranted, 1433	Humphrey of Lancaster; 1390–1447; Duke of Gloucester	John Beaufort; 1373–1410	Joan Beaufort c. 1379–1440	Edward of Norwich c. 1373–1415; Duke of Aumale, 2nd Duke of York	Richard of Conisburgh; 1385–1415
Dukedom of Clarence (2nd creation) extinct, 1421	Dukedom of Bedford (2nd creation) extinct, 1435	Dukedom of Gloucester (2nd creation) extinct, 1447	Dukedom of Albemarle (Aumale) (1st creation) forfeit, 1399
Duke of York (1st creation) restored, 1425; Duke of Cornwall (3rd creation), 1460
King James I 1394–1437	Joan Beaufort c. 1404–1445	Owen Tudor c. 1400–1461	John Beaufort; 1404–1444	Richard Neville; 1400–1460	Cecily Neville; 1415–1495	Richard of York; 1411–1460; 3rd Duke of York, Duke of Cornwall
Duke of Cornwall (3rd creation) extinct, 1460
Duke of Bedford (5th creation), 1485	Duke of Clarence (3rd creation), 1461	Duke of Gloucester (3rd creation), 1461
King James II; 1430–1460	Jasper Tudor c. 1431–1495; Duke of Bedford	Edmund Tudor c. 1430–1456	Lady Margaret Beaufort; 1443–1509	John Neville c. 1431–1471	Elizabeth Woodville c. 1437–1492	Edward; 1442–1483; 4th Duke of York, later King Edward IV	George Plantagenet; 1449–1478; Duke of Clarence	Richard of York; 1452–1485; Duke of Gloucester, later King Richard III
Dukedom of Bedford (5th creation) extinct, 1495	Dukedom of York (1st creation) merged in the Crown, 1461	Dukedom of Clarence (3rd creation) forfeit, 1478	Dukedom of Gloucester (3rd creation) merged in the Crown, 1483
Duke of Albany (2nd creation), 1458	Duke of Bedford (3rd creation), 1470	Duke of York (2nd creation), 1474; Duke of Norfolk (3rd creation), 1477	Duke of Bedford (4th creation), 1478
Alexander Stewart c. 1454–1485; 1st Duke of Albany	King James III; 1451/1452–1488	George Neville; 1457–1483; Duke of Bedford	King Henry VII; 1457–1509	Elizabeth of York; 1466–1503	Richard of Shrewsbury; 1473–1483; Duke of York, Duke of Norfolk	George of York; 1477–1479; Duke of Bedford
Dukedom of Bedford (3rd creation) forfeit, 1478	Dukedom of York (2nd creation) and Dukedom of Norfolk (3rd creation) extinct, 1483	Dukedom of Bedford (4th creation) extinct, 1479
Duke of Ross (1st creation), 1488	Duke of York (3rd creation), 1494	Duke of Somerset (3rd creation), 1499
John Stewart; 1482–1536; 2nd Duke of Albany	James Stewart; 1476–1504; Duke of Ross	King James IV; 1473–1513	Margaret Tudor; 1489–1541	Henry; 1491–1547; Duke of York, later King Henry VIII	Edmund Tudor; 1499–1500; Duke of Somerset (nominated but probably not invested)
Dukedom of Albany (2nd creation) extinct, 1536	Dukedom of Ross (1st creation) extinct, 1504	Dukedom of York (3rd creation) merged in the Crown, 1509	Dukedom of Somerset (3rd creation) extinct, 1500
Duke of Ross (2nd creation), 1514
King James V 1512–1542	Alexander Stewart; 1514–1515; Duke of Ross
Duke of Albany (3rd creation), 1565	Dukedom of Ross (2nd creation) extinct, 1515
Henry Stuart; 1546–1567; 1st Duke of Albany	Queen Mary; 1542–1587
James; 1566–1625; 2nd Duke of Albany, later King James VI & I
Dukedom of Albany (3rd creation) merged in the Crown, 1567
Duke of Albany (4th creation), 1604; Duke of York (4th creation), 1605	Duke of Kintyre and Lorne, 1602
Elizabeth Stuart; 1596–1662	Henry Frederick; 1594–1612	Charles; 1600–1649; Duke of Albany, Duke of York, later King Charles I	Robert Stuart; 1602; Duke of Kintyre and Lorne
Dukedom of Albany (4th creation), Dukedom of York (4th creation) merged in the Crown, 1625	Dukedom of Kintyre and Lorne extinct, 1602
Duke of York (5th creation) 1644; Duke of Albany (5th creation), 1660	Duke of Gloucester (4th creation), 1659
Sophia of Hanover; 1630–1714	James Stuart; 1633–1701; Duke of York, Duke of Albany, later King James VII & II	Henry; 1640–1660; Duke of Gloucester
Dukedom of Albany (5th creation) and Dukedom of York (5th creation) merged in the Crown, 1685	Dukedom of Gloucester (4th creation) extinct, 1660
Duke of York and Albany (1st creation), 1716	Duke of Cambridge (1st creation), 1664	Duke of Kendal (1st creation), 1666	Duke of Cambridge (2nd creation), 1667
King George I 1660–1727	Ernest Augustus; 1674–1728; Duke of York and Albany	Charles Stuart; 1660–1661 styled Duke of Cambridge	James Stuart; 1663–1667; Duke of Cambridge	Queen Anne; 1665–1714	Charles Stuart; 1666–1667 designated Duke of Kendal	Edgar Stuart; 1667–1671; Duke of Cambridge	Charles Stuart; 1677 styled Duke of Cambridge
Dukedom of York and Albany (1st creation) extinct, 1728	Dukedom of Cambridge (1st creation) extinct, 1667	Dukedom of Kendal (1st creation), extinct, 1667	Dukedom of Cambridge (2nd creation) extinct, 1671
Duke of Cambridge (3rd creation)
George; 1683–1760; Duke of Cambridge, later King George II	William; 1689–1700 styled Duke of Gloucester
Dukedom of Cambridge (3rd creation) merged with the Crown, 1727
Duke of Edinburgh (1st creation), 1726	Duke of Cumberland (3rd creation), 1726
Frederick; 1707–1751; 1st Duke of Edinburgh, styled Duke of Gloucester until created Duke of Edinburgh	William Augustus; 1721–1765; Duke of Cumberland
Dukedom of Cumberland (3rd creation) extinct, 1765
Duke of York and Albany (2nd creation), 1760	Duke of Gloucester and Edinburgh, 1764	Duke of Cumberland and Strathearn, 1766
George; 1738–1820; 2nd Duke of Edinburgh, later King George III	Edward; 1739–1767; Duke of York and Albany	William Henry; 1743–1805; 1st Duke of Gloucester and Edinburgh	Henry; 1745–1790; Duke of Cumberland and Strathearn
Dukedom of Edinburgh (1st creation), merged in the Crown, 1760	Dukedom of York and Albany (2nd creation) extinct, 1767	Dukedom of Cumberland and Strathearn extinct, 1790
Duke of York and Albany (3rd creation), 1784	Duke of Clarence and St Andrews, 1789	Duke of Kent and Strathearn, 1799	Duke of Cumberland and Teviotdale, 1799	Duke of Sussex (1st creation), 1801	Duke of Cambridge (4th creation), 1801
Frederick; 1763–1827; Duke of York and Albany	William Henry; 1765–1837, Duke of Clarence and St Andrews, later King William IV	Edward; 1767–1820; Duke of Kent and Strathearn	Ernest Augustus; 1771–1851; King of Hanover, 1st Duke of Cumberland and Teviotdale	Augustus Frederick; 1773–1843; Duke of Sussex	Adolphus; 1774–1850; 1st Duke of Cambridge	Mary; 1776–1857	William Frederick; 1776–1834; 2nd Duke of Gloucester and Edinburgh
Dukedom of York and Albany (3rd creation) extinct, 1827	Dukedom of Clarence and St Andrews merged in the Crown, 1830	Dukedom of Kent and Strathearn extinct, 1820	Dukedom of Sussex (1st creation) extinct, 1843	Dukedom of Gloucester and Edinburgh extinct, 1834
Queen Victoria; 1819–1901	George V 1819–1878; King of Hanover, 2nd Duke of Cumberland and Teviotdale	George; 1819–1904; 2nd Duke of Cambridge	Mary Adelaide; 1833–1897
Dukedom of Cambridge (4th creation) extinct, 1904
Duke of Edinburgh (2nd creation), 1866	Duke of Connaught and Strathearn, 1874	Duke of Albany (6th creation), 1881
King Edward VII; 1841–1910	Ernest Augustus; 1845–1923; 3rd Duke of Cumberland and Teviotdale	Alice; 1843–1878	Alfred Ernest Albert; 1844–1900; Duke of Edinburgh	Arthur; 1850–1942; 1st Duke of Connaught and Strathearn	Leopold; 1853–1884; 1st Duke of Albany
Dukedom of Cumberland and Teviotdale forfeit, 1919	Dukedom of Edinburgh (2nd creation) extinct, 1900
Duke of Clarence and Avondale, 1890	Duke of York (6th creation), 1892
Albert Victor; 1864–1892; Duke of Clarence and Avondale	George; 1865–1936; Duke of York, later King George V	Mary of Teck; 1867–1953	Victoria of Hesse and by Rhine; 1863–1950	Arthur of Connaught; 1883–1938
Dukedom of Clarence and Avondale extinct, 1892	Dukedom of York (6th creation) merged in the Crown, 1910
Duke of Windsor, 1937	Duke of York (7th creation), 1920	Duke of Kent (2nd creation), 1934	Duke of Gloucester (5th creation), 1928
King Edward VIII; 1894–1972; Later Duke of Windsor	Albert; 1895–1952; Duke of York, later King George VI	Alice of Battenberg; 1885–1969	George; 1902–1942; 1st Duke of Kent	Henry; 1900–1974; 1st Duke of Gloucester	Alastair Arthur; 1914–1943; 2nd Duke of Connaught and Strathearn	Charles Edward; 1884–1954; 2nd Duke of Albany
Dukedom of Windsor extinct, 1972	Dukedom of York (7th creation) merged in the Crown, 1936	Dukedom of Connaught and Strathearn extinct, 1943	Dukedom of Albany (6th creation) forfeit, 1919
Duke of Edinburgh (3rd creation), 1947
Queen Elizabeth II; 1926–2022	Philip; 1921–2021; 1st Duke of Edinburgh	Edward b. 1935; 2nd Duke of Kent
Duke of York (8th creation), 1986 (revoked 2025)	Duke of Edinburgh (4th creation), 2023
Charles b. 1948; 2nd Duke of Edinburgh, later King Charles III	Andrew b. 1960; Duke of York	Edward b. 1964; Duke of Edinburgh	George Windsor b. 1962	Richard b. 1944; 2nd Duke of Gloucester
Dukedom of Edinburgh (3rd creation) merged in the Crown, 2022	No male heirs	Dukedom of Edinburgh (4th creation) is a life peerage and therefore not hereditary	Heir apparent to the Dukedom of Kent
Duke of Cambridge (5th creation), 2011	Duke of Sussex (2nd creation), 2018
William b. 1982; Duke of Cambridge	Harry b. 1984; Duke of Sussex	Edward Windsor b. 1988	Alexander Windsor b. 1974
Heir-apparent to the Dukedom of Gloucester
George of Wales b. 2013	Archie of Sussex b. 2019
Heir apparent to the Dukedom of Cambridge	Heir apparent to the Dukedom of Sussex

== See also ==
- Baron Russell of Thornhaugh
- Baron de Clifford
- Earl Russell
- Earl of Orford, first creation (1697)
- Baron Ampthill
