= Francis Russell, 2nd Earl of Bedford =

English nobleman and politician (c. 1527–1585)

The Right Honourable The Earl of Bedford KG PC
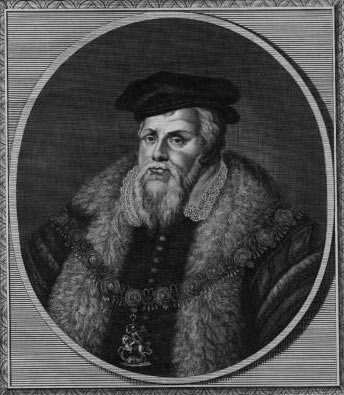

Personal details
- Born: c. 1527
- Died: 28 July 1585 (aged 57–58) London
- Spouses: Margaret St John (died 1562) Bridget Hussey (m. 1566)
- Relations: Edward Russell, 3rd Earl of Bedford (grandson); Francis Russell, 4th Earl of Bedford (grandson)
- Parent(s): John Russell, 1st Earl of Bedford; Anne Sapcote
- Education: King's Hall, Cambridge

Francis Russell, 2nd Earl of Bedford (c. 1527 – 28 July 1585) of Chenies in Buckinghamshire and of Bedford House in Exeter, Devon, was an English nobleman, soldier, and politician. He was a godfather to the Devon-born sailor Sir Francis Drake. He served as Lord Lieutenant of Devon (1584-5).

== Early life ==
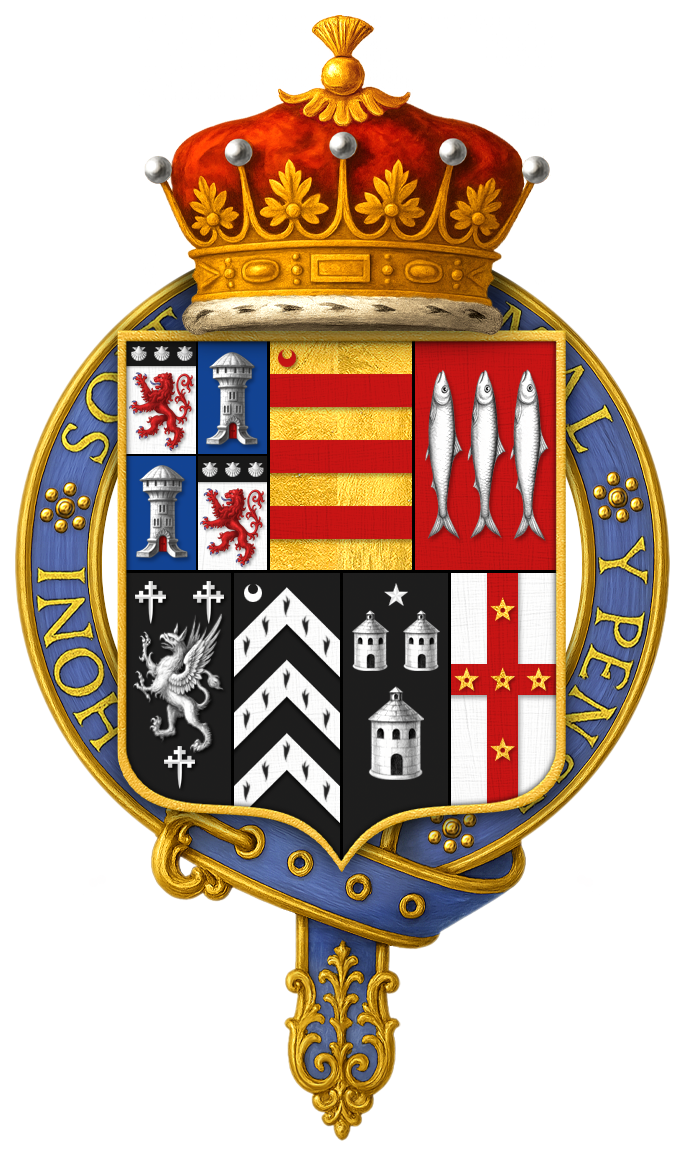
Quartered arms of Sir Francis Russell, 2nd Earl of Bedford, KG

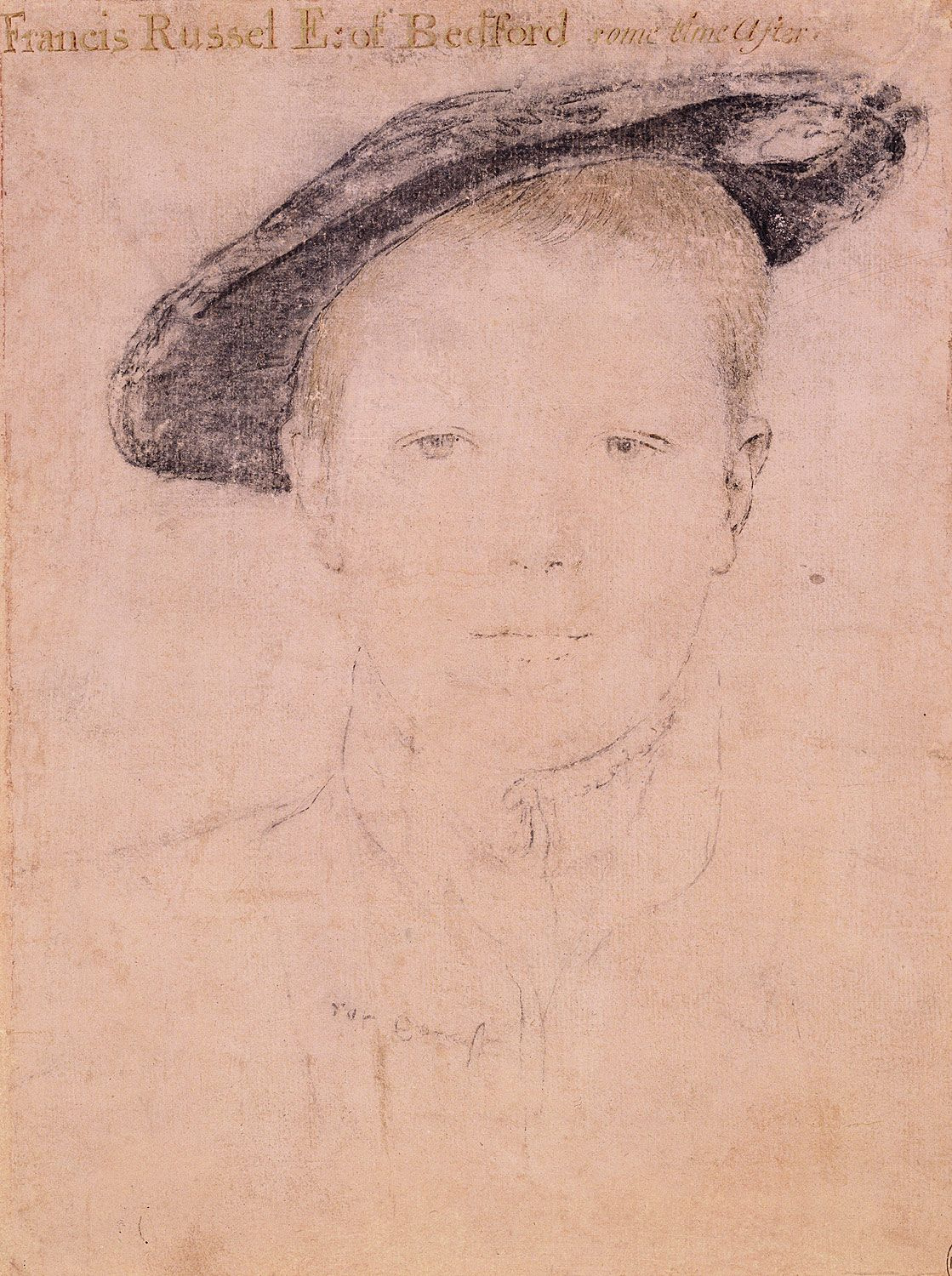
Francis Russell as a boy, by Hans Holbein the Younger, drawing in the Royal Collection

Francis was the son of John Russell, 1st Earl of Bedford and Anne Sapcote. He was educated at King's Hall, Cambridge and accompanied his father, to sit in the House of Commons. He represented Buckinghamshire in parliament in 1545–47 and 1547–52. In 1547 he was appointed High Sheriff of Bedfordshire and Buckinghamshire. He assisted to quell the rising in Devon in 1549, and after his father had been created Earl of Bedford in January 1550, was known as Lord Russell, taking his seat in the House of Lords under this title in 1552.

Russell was in sympathy with reformers, whose opinions he shared, and was in communication with Sir Thomas Wyatt; and in consequence of his religious attitude was imprisoned during the earlier part of Mary's reign. Being released he visited Italy, and came into touch with foreign reformers. He led the English contingent fighting for Philip II of Spain, then England's King Consort, at the Battle of St. Quentin in 1557.

== Elizabeth I ==
When Elizabeth I of England ascended the throne in November 1558 the Earl of Bedford, as Russell had been since 1555, became an active figure in public life. He was made a privy councillor, and was sent on diplomatic errands to Charles IX of France and Mary, Queen of Scots.

From February 1564 to October 1567 he was governor of Berwick and warden of the east marches of Scotland, in which capacity he conducted various negotiations between Elizabeth and Mary. With the diplomat Thomas Randolph, Bedford wrote an account of the murder of Mary's secretary David Rizzio on 9 March 1566.

Bedford represented Elizabeth as her ambassador at the baptism of Prince James on 17 December 1566 at Stirling Castle, and was guest of honour at the subsequent banquet and masque. Mary, Queen of Scots gave him a gold chain set with pearls, diamonds, and rubies. After the baptism, Mary's half-brother James Stewart, 1st Earl of Moray took him on a tour of Fife. They visited St Andrews and Hallyards, a house of William Kirkcaldy of Grange.

He appears to have been an efficient border warden, but was irritated by the vacillating and tortuous conduct of the English queen. When the northern insurrection broke out in 1569, Bedford was sent into Wales, and he sat in judgment upon the Duke of Norfolk in 1572.

In 1576 he was president of the council of Wales. In 1581 he was one of the commissioners deputed to arrange a marriage between Elizabeth and François, Duke of Anjou. Bedford, who was made a Knight of the Garter in 1564, appears to have been a generous and popular man, and died in London in 1585. His eldest son, Francis, had been killed at the Scottish border the previous day, so he was succeeded instead by his grandson, Francis' son, Edward Russell, 3rd Earl of Bedford.

== Personal life ==
His first wife was Margaret (née St John) Gostwick (1533–1562), a widow of Sir John Gostwick. Margaret was a daughter of Sir John St John (great-grandson of Margaret Beauchamp of Bletso) and Margaret Waldegrave (a daughter of Sir William Waldegrave). Together, they were the parents of four sons and three daughters:

- Lady Anne Russell (1548–1603), who married Ambrose Dudley, 3rd Earl of Warwick.
- Henry Russell, Baron Russell (1551–1572), who married his step-sister, Jane Sybilla Morrison of Cashiobury, without issue.
- John Russell, Baron Russell (c. 1553–1584), who married Elizabeth Hoby, widow of Sir Thomas Hoby and daughter of Sir Anthony Cooke. They had one son, Francis, who died young, and two daughters, which included Anne Russell, wife of Henry Somerset, 1st Marquess of Worcester.
- Francis Russell, Baron Russell (c. 1554–1585), MP for Northumberland, from 1572 to 1584; captured at the Raid of the Redeswire in 1575, mortally wounded in a fray on the Scottish border on 27 July 1585, dying hours before his father. He married Juliana Foster and had issue, including Edward Russell, 3rd Earl of Bedford.
- William Russell, 1st Baron Russell of Thornhaugh (c. 1557–1613), the Lord Deputy of Ireland who married Elizabeth Long, granddaughter of Sir Richard Long. They had one son, Francis Russell, 4th Earl of Bedford.
- Lady Elizabeth Russell (d. 1605), who married William Bourchier, 3rd Earl of Bath.
- Lady Margaret Russell (1560–1616), who married George Clifford, 3rd Earl of Cumberland.

Lady Bedford died on 27 August 1562. Bedford married his second wife, Bridget Manners, the Dowager Countess of Rutland (c. 1526 – 13 January 1600/1601), on 25 June 1566. Lady Rutland, a daughter of John Hussey, 1st Baron Hussey of Sleaford and Lady Anne Grey (a daughter of George Grey, 2nd Earl of Kent), had been twice widowed; first from Ambassador Sir Richard Morrison of Cashiobury in 1556, and second from Henry Manners, 2nd Earl of Rutland in 1563.

Lord Bedford died in London on 28 July 1585. He was buried at the family chapel at St. Michael's Church next to Chenies Manor House, the family estate which he had made his principal home and where he had entertained Queen Elizabeth in 1570. He was succeeded as third Earl by his grandson, Edward Russell (1572–1627), only son of Francis Russell, Lord Russell.

=== Descendants ===
Through his grandson, Francis Russell, 4th Earl of Bedford (1587–1641) who was born two years after Lord Bedford's death in 1585, he was a great-grandfather of William Russell (1616–1700) who married Lady Anne Carr (a daughter of Robert Carr, 1st Earl of Somerset) and became the 5th Earl of Bedford before he was created Duke of Bedford and Marquess of Tavistock on 11 May 1694.

== See also ==
- Chenies Manor House

== Sources ==
- Prince, Hugh C. (2008). Parks in Hertfordshire Since 1500. Hertfordshire Publications.
- Tittler, Robert; Richards, Judith (2014). The Reign of Mary I. Routledge.
- Richardson, Douglas, Kimball G. Everingham, and David Faris. Plantagenet Ancestry A Study in Colonial and Medieval Families. Royal ancestry series. Baltimore, Md: Genealogical Pub. Co, 2004. Accessed 28 October 2007

Political offices
Preceded by Sir Francis Bryan	Custos Rotulorum of Buckinghamshire bef. 1547–c.1578	Succeeded by Lord Grey de Wilton
Preceded by Sir Robert Drury	High Sheriff of Bedfordshire and Buckinghamshire; 1547–1548	Succeeded by Francis Pygot
Preceded by The Earl of Bedford	Lord Warden of the Stannaries; 1553–1580	Succeeded by Sir Walter Raleigh
Unknown	Lord Lieutenant of Cornwall; 1584–1585	Succeeded by Sir Francis Godolphin; Sir William Mohun; Peter Edgcumbe; Richard Carew
Vacant Title last held by The 2nd Earl of Bath	Lord Lieutenant of Devon; 1584–1585	Succeeded by The 3rd Earl of Bath
Unknown	Lord Lieutenant of Dorset; 1584–1585	Succeeded by The Marquess of Winchester
Legal offices
Preceded by The Earl of Sussex	Justice in Eyre south of the Trent; 1584–1585	Succeeded by The Earl of Leicester
Peerage of England
Preceded by John Russell	Earl of Bedford; 1555–1585	Succeeded by Edward Russell
Preceded by John Russell	Baron Russell (writ in acceleration) (descended by acceleration); 1553–1581	Succeeded by John Russell
Preceded by John Russell	Baron Russell; 1584–1585	Succeeded by Edward Russell
