= Anne Russell, Countess of Bedford =

English noblewoman (1645–1684)

The Right Honourable The Countess of Bedford
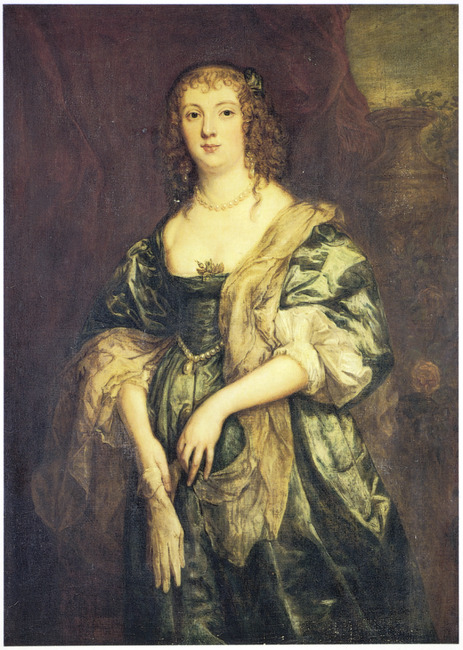
- Portrait of Anne, Countess of Bedford by Anthony van Dyck, c. 1638
- Born: Lady Anne Carr; 9 December 1615; Tower of London, London, England
- Died: 10 May 1684 (aged 68); Woburn Abbey, Bedfordshire, England
- Buried: Bedford Chapel, St Michael's Church, Chenies, Buckinghamshire
- Spouse: William Russell, 5th Earl of Bedford
- Issue: Lord James Russell; Francis Russell, Lord Russell; William Russell, Lord Russell; Margaret Russell, Countess of Orford; John Russell; Lord Edward Russell; Diana Alington, Lady Alington
- Parents: Robert Carr, 1st Earl of Somerset; Lady Frances Howard

Anne Russell, Countess of Bedford (9 December 1615 – 10 May 1684), formerly Lady Anne Carr, was a wealthy English noblewoman, and the wife of William Russell, 5th Earl of Bedford, a peer and soldier during the English Civil War, who after her death was created Duke of Bedford. Her mother was Frances Howard. In about 1638, Anne was the subject of at least two portraits by Flemish painter Anthony van Dyck.

== Family ==
Anticipating the birth and christening of his child, in September 1615, at one time the royal favourite Robert Carr, 1st Earl of Somerset commissioned new silver plate from the goldsmith John Williams. Lady Anne was born, on 9 December 1615, the only child and heir of the Earl of Somerset and Frances Howard, a member of the noble Howard family. She is said to have been born in the Tower of London, but some sources say she was born at the house of Lord D'Aubigny on the Strand, where her mother was kept under house-arrest during her pregnancy. According to the Diary of Lady Anne Clifford, her mother was taken to the Tower on 24 March 1616.

Anne was baptised on 16 December 1615 at St Martin's Church, Ludgate. At the time of her birth, her parents were imprisoned on charges of having participated in the fatal poisoning of Sir Thomas Overbury in 1613. They were both sentenced to death, but later spared execution. Her mother admitted to her complicity in the crime but her father maintained his innocence. The family remained in the Tower until January 1622 when King James I pardoned the Earl and Countess of Somerset.

== Marriage and issue ==
Anne was described as having been virtuous and one of the three beauties of the royal court. Her beauty caught the eye of William Russell, the son and heir of Francis Russell, 4th Earl of Bedford and Catherine Brydges. Remembering the notorious scandal caused by Anne's parents; in particular, the infamous reputation of her mother, as well as the ignominy of her own birth in the Tower of London during the Somersets' imprisonment, William's father staunchly opposed the match, warning his son to be "upon his guard against the dangerous beauty of Anne Carr". A passionate attachment sprang up between William and Anne and the former refused to yield to his father's wishes in the matter. King Charles I, who favoured the marriage, eventually persuaded the earl to give his consent to the match; thus on 11 July 1637 at St. Benet's Church, Paul's Wharf, London, William Russell and Anne Carr were married. She brought him a fortune of £12,000, and the London property on which stood Southampton House, which became Bedford House and was developed later in the century as Bloomsbury Square.

In about 1638, the celebrated Flemish artist, Anthony van Dyck painted at least two portraits of Anne.

When William succeeded as the 5th Earl of Bedford on 9 May 1641 upon the death of his father, Anne was thereafter styled as Countess of Bedford. She was never the Duchess of Bedford as William was not created a duke until ten years following her death.

The couple resided at Woburn Abbey in Bedfordshire, and their marriage was said to have been happy.

For a list of William and Anne's eight children, see William Russell, 1st Duke of Bedford

== Death ==
Anne died on 10 May 1684 at Woburn Abbey. Her death occurred a year after her son, William became one of the conspirators in the Rye House Plot; he was later arrested and beheaded on 21 July 1683 for treason against the King (Charles II) and the Duke of York (later James II). It was believed at the time that her death was brought about by the shock she received at the execution of William; from that moment onwards, her health had visibly declined and she never recovered. She was buried in the Bedford Chapel at Chenies parish church, Buckinghamshire on 16 May.

A splendid white marble monument to Anne and her husband occupies the west wall of the chapel. She is represented beside her husband in classical drapery on a high pedestal, seated in an attitude intended to express grief.

== See also ==
- Frances Carr, Countess of Somerset
- Thomas Overbury

== Ancestry ==
Ancestors of Anne Russell, Countess of Bedford

Sir John Kerr
Sir Thomas Kerr of Ferniehirst
Catherine Kerr
Robert Carr, 1st Earl of Somerset
Sir William Scott of Kincurd
Janet Scott
Grisel Beaton
Anne Carr
Thomas Howard, 4th Duke of Norfolk
Thomas Howard, 1st Earl of Suffolk
Margaret Audley
Lady Frances Howard
Sir Henry Knyvet
Catherine Knyvet
Elizabeth Stumpe

== Sources ==
- G. E. Cokayne, The Complete Peerage, Volume II, p. 80
- Jeremiah Holmes Wiffen, Historical Memoirs of the House of Russell:from the time of the Norman Conquest, Volume 2, Google Books.
