= Custos Rotulorum of Devon =

People who has served as Custos Rotulorum of Devon

This is a list of people who have served as Custos Rotulorum of Devon.

- Sir Thomas Denys 1507–1553
- Sir Peter Carew bef. 1558–1575
- Sir Gawain Carew bef. 1577 – bef. 1584
- Sir John Gilbert bef. 1584–1596
- Edward Russell, 3rd Earl of Bedford 1596–1619
- Sir Robert Chichester (died 1627), per inscription on his monument in Pilton Church, dates not stated
- Francis Russell, 4th Earl of Bedford 1619–1641
- William Russell, 5th Earl of Bedford 1641–1642
- Henry Bourchier, 5th Earl of Bath 1642–1646
- Interregnum
- George Monck, 1st Duke of Albemarle 1660–1670
- John Granville, 1st Earl of Bath 1670–1675
- Christopher Monck, 2nd Duke of Albemarle 1675–1688
- John Granville, 1st Earl of Bath 1689–1696
- Thomas Grey, 2nd Earl of Stamford 1696–1711?
- John Poulett, 1st Earl Poulett 1711–1714

For later custodes rotulorum, see Lord Lieutenant of Devon.
