= William Russell, 1st Duke of Bedford =

British nobleman

His Grace The Duke of Bedford KG PC
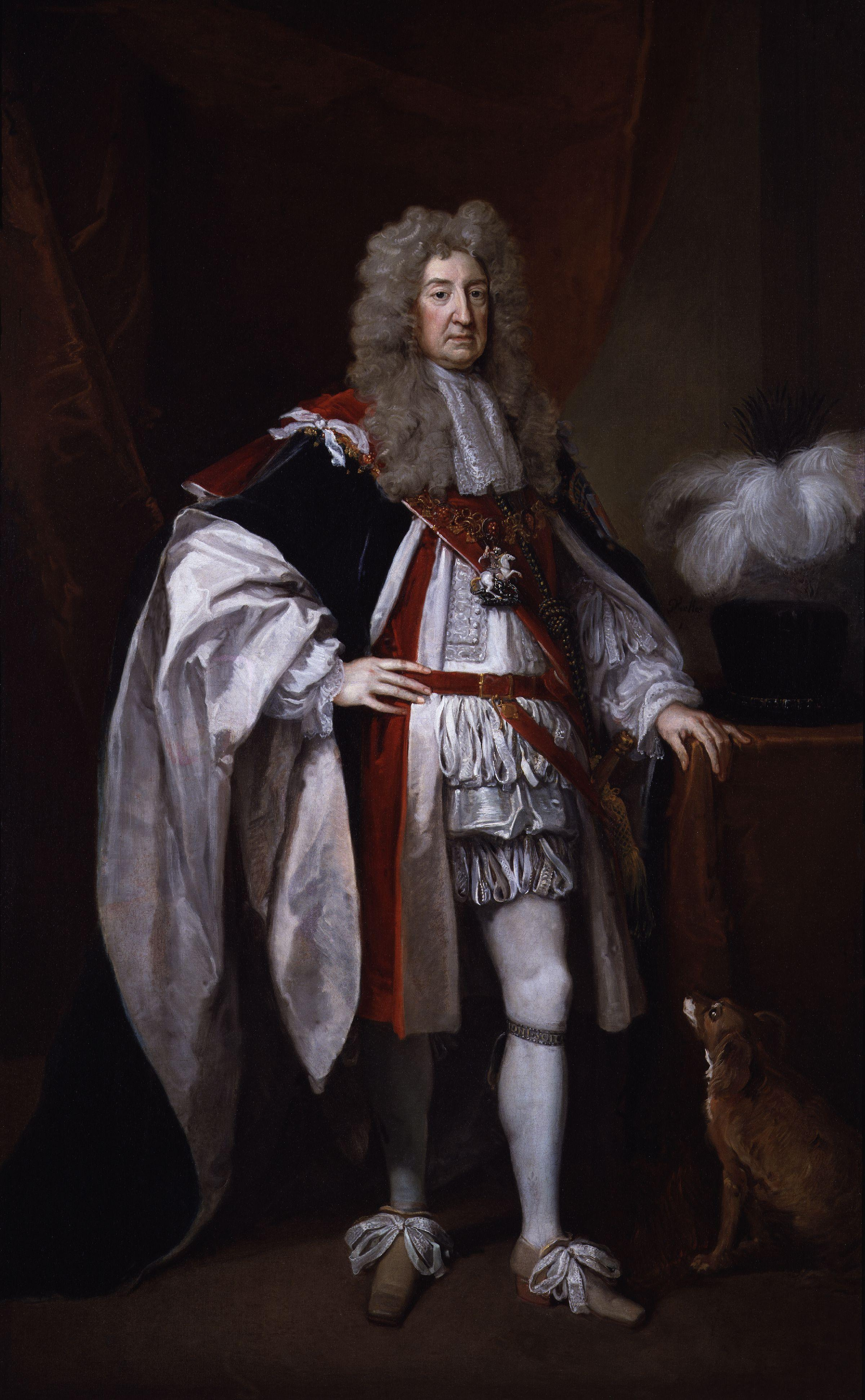
- Portrait by Godfrey Kneller
- Tenure: 11 May 1694 – 7 September 1700
- Successor: Wriothesley Russell, 2nd Duke of Bedford
- Other titles: 1st Marquess of Tavistock; 5th Earl of Bedford; 5th Baron Russell; 3rd Baron Russell of Thornhaugh; 1st Baron Howland
- Born: August 1616
- Died: 7 September 1700 (aged 84)
- Spouse: Anne Carr, Countess of Bedford
- Issue: Francis Russell; William Russell; John Russell; Edward Russell; Robert Russell; Anne Russell; James Russell; George Russell; Diana Russell; Catharine Russell; Margaret Russell
- Parents: Francis Russell, 4th Earl of Bedford; Catharine Brydges

William Russell, 1st Duke of Bedford (August 1616 – 7 September 1700) was an English nobleman and politician who sat in the House of Commons from 1640 until 1641 when he inherited his Peerage as 5th Earl of Bedford and removed to the House of Lords. He fought in the Parliamentarian army and later defected to the Royalists during the English Civil War.

== Early life, 1616–1640 ==
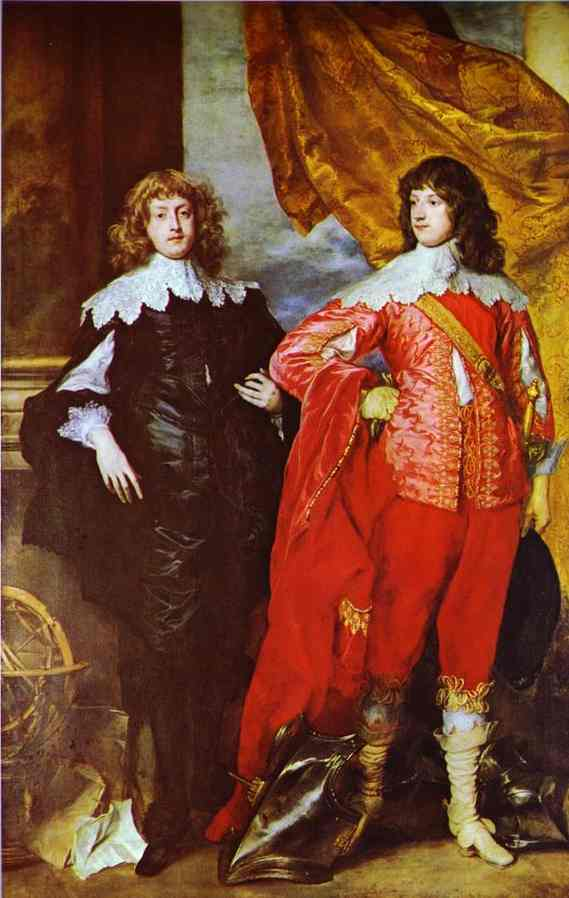
Bedford (right), with George Digby, 2nd Earl of Bristol in a 1637 painting by Anthony van Dyck.

He was the son of Francis Russell, 4th Earl of Bedford and his wife Catherine, the daughter and coheir of Giles Brydges, 3rd Baron Chandos.

Russell was educated at Magdalen College, Oxford, and then, in 1635 went to Madrid where he hoped to learn Spanish. He returned by July 1637, at which point he concluded a marriage (initially against his father's wishes), to Anne, the sole heir of Robert Carr, 1st Earl of Somerset.

== Career during the English Civil War, 1640–1644 ==
=== Bedford as Parliamentarian, 1640–1642 ===
In April 1640, Russell was elected Member of Parliament (MP) for Tavistock in the Short Parliament. He was re-elected MP for Tavistock in the Long Parliament in November 1640 and sat until 1641. John Pym was the other MP for Tavistock. Russell followed his father's lead and sided with Parliament in its emerging conflict with Charles I which would shortly lead to the English Civil War.

In May 1641, Russell's father died unexpectedly of smallpox and he succeeded him as 5th Earl of Bedford. Although he was only 24 at the time, Parliament gave Bedford considerable responsibilities, naming him a commissioner to treat with the king in 1641 and naming him Lord Lieutenant of Devon and Lord Lieutenant of Somerset in 1642. He was made General of the Horse in the Parliamentary Service on 14 July 1642 and in September he led an expedition in western England against royalist forces under the command of the Marquess of Hertford. Although Bedford's forces outnumbered Hertford's, Bedford's troops were poorly trained and many deserted and, upon his return to London, Bedford was criticised for his performance.

The next month, he joined Robert Devereux, 3rd Earl of Essex and fought with the Parliamentarians in the Battle of Edgehill on 23 October 1642.

=== Bedford as Royalist, 1643 ===
By the summer of 1643, Bedford had aligned himself with the parliamentary "peace party" headed by Henry Rich, 1st Earl of Holland and John Holles, 2nd Earl of Clare, which advocated a settlement with Charles I. When Essex rejected the peace party's advice, Bedford became one of the "peace lords" who abandoned the Parliamentary cause and joined Charles I at Oxford: the king pardoned Bedford for his previous position in the conflict.

Bedford returned to battle, this time on the side of the Royalists, with his participation in the Siege of Gloucester (3 August – 5 September 1643) and the first Battle of Newbury (20 September 1643). On 16 June 1644, the eve of the Second Battle of Newbury, the King's daughter Princess Henrietta was born in Bedford House, Exeter, the Earl's town house in the South-West.

=== Bedford attempts to return to the Parliamentary side, 1643–44 ===
Although Charles I fully pardoned Bedford, Charles' inner circle remained wary of Bedford and was therefore reluctant to give him anything but minor responsibilities. Disillusioned, Bedford returned to the Parliamentary side in December 1643, claiming that he had only been attempting to negotiate a settlement with the king and had never intended to abandon the Parliamentary cause. Parliament, however, remained wary of a man who had abandoned them and refused to allow Bedford to retake his seat in the House of Lords.

== Withdrawal from public life, 1644–1660 ==
At any rate, the increasingly radical course pursued by the army in the mid-1640s alienated Bedford and he withdrew to his estate at Woburn. Although he took the Engagement in 1650, Bedford would not play any significant public role during the English Interregnum.

== Career at the Restoration, 1660–1683 ==
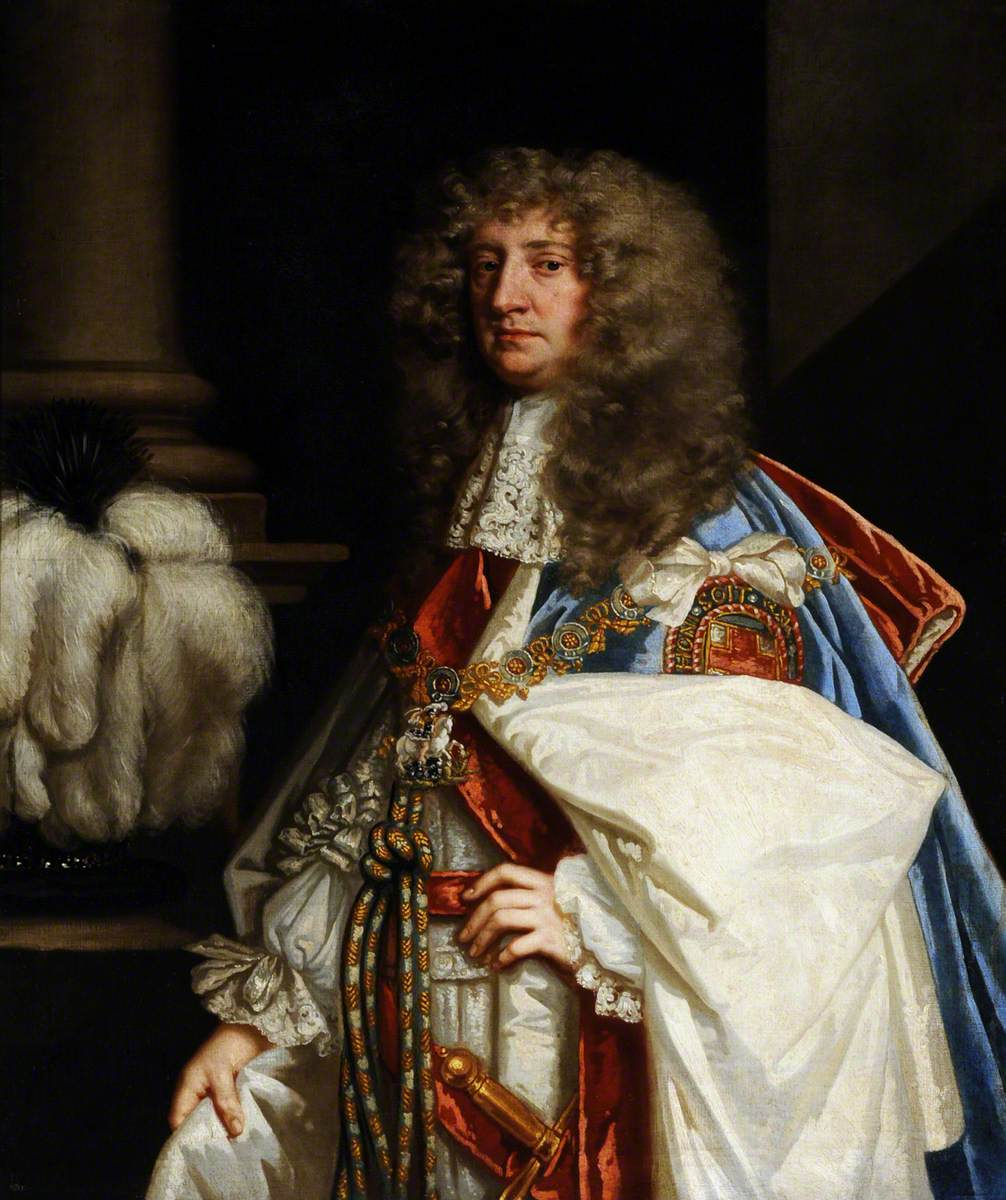
Portrait by Peter Lely

At the Restoration of 1660, Bedford resumed his seat in the House of Lords, becoming a leader of the Presbyterian faction. Bedford bore the sceptre at Charles II's coronation in 1661, but he was never close to the king.

In an attempt to win Bedford's support in the run-up to the Third Anglo-Dutch War, Charles II made Bedford Governor of Plymouth Colony in 1671 and, on 29 May 1672, the day after the Battle of Solebay, had him invested as a Knight of the Garter. He held the office of Joint Commissioner for the office of Earl Marshal in 1673. Charles' courtship of Bedford ended shortly thereafter when his overtures to the Dissenters proved fruitless.

Although Bedford attended services in the Established Church, he also kept a Presbyterian chaplain in his household and his wife was arrested in 1675 for attending a conventicle. This made Bedford a natural ally of Anthony Ashley-Cooper, 1st Earl of Shaftesbury in opposition to the Earl of Danby's plans to establish royalist and Anglican dominance. As such, Bedford supported Shaftesbury and the Whigs during the Exclusion Crisis. The king consequently turned against Bedford, and, in 1682, the family borough of Tavistock lost its charter.

== Second withdrawal from public life, 1683–1688 ==
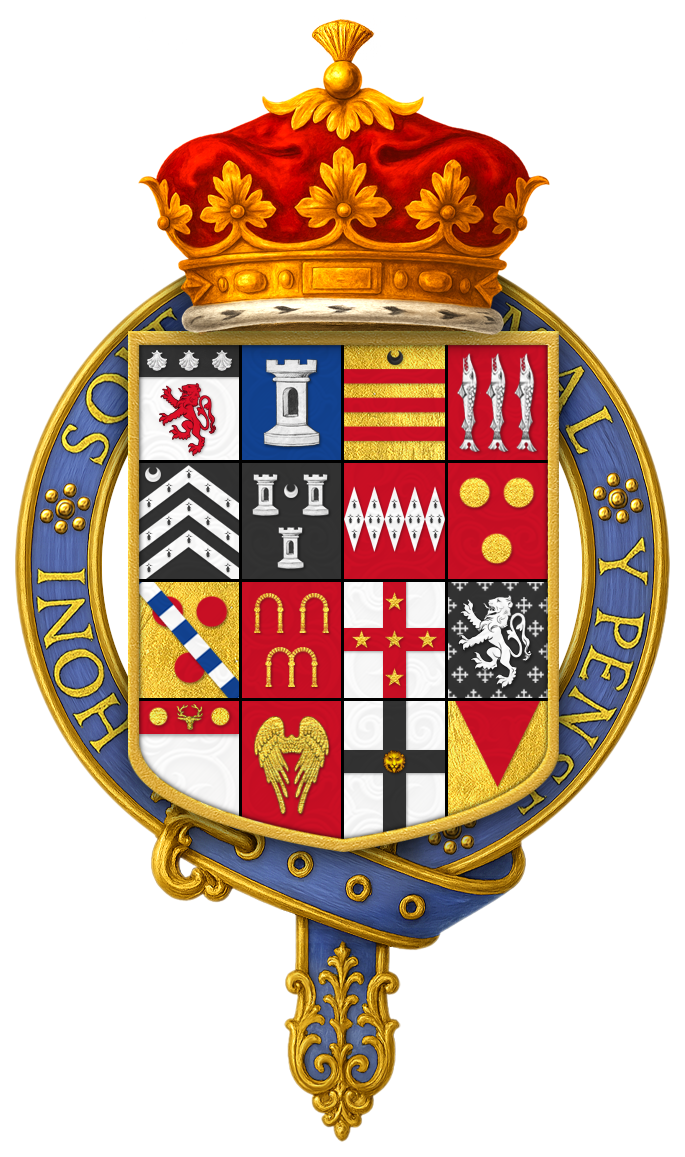
Quartered arms of William Russell, 1st Duke of Bedford, KG

In 1683, Bedford's son, William Russell, Lord Russell was implicated in the Rye House Plot and was executed. Following his son's execution, Bedford withdrew from politics.

== Career under William and Mary, 1688–1700 ==
Bedford returned to public life at the time of the Glorious Revolution. He again carried the sceptre at the coronation of William and Mary, and was made a member of the Privy Council. He was made Recorder of Cambridge in 1689. He was Lord Lieutenant of Cambridgeshire and Lord Lieutenant of Bedfordshire between 1689 and 1700 and Lord Lieutenant of Middlesex between 1692 and 1700.

He was invested as a Privy Counsellor (P.C.) on 14 February 1689 and created Duke of Bedford and Marquess of Tavistock on 11 May 1694. He was created Baron Howland of Streatham on 13 June 1695, with remainder to his grandson, Wriothesley Russell.

Bedford died on 7 September 1700 at age 84 at Bedford House, London and was buried on 17 September in the 'Bedford Chapel' at St. Michael's Church at Chenies, Buckinghamshire.

== Marriage and family ==
Russell married Anne Carr, daughter of the Earl of Somerset, on 11 July 1637. Her dowry of £12,000 was never paid in full They had children:

- Francis Russell, Lord Russell (1638–1678), died unmarried.
- William Russell, Lord Russell (1639–1683), married Lady Rachel Wriothesley and had issue.
- John Russell, died in infancy.
- Lord Edward Russell (1643–30 Jun 1714), married (1668) Frances Williams.
- Lord Robert Russell (c. 1645–c. 1703) married (1690) his cousin Letitia Cheek.
- Lady Anne Russell (c. 1650–1657), died eating poisonous berries at Woburn
- Lord James Russell (c. 1651–22 Jun 1712), married Elizabeth Lloyd and had issue.
- Lord George Russell (c. 1652–1692), married Sarah Milby.
- Lady Diana Russell (9 Apr 1652–1701), married firstly, Greville Verney, 9th Baron Willoughby de Broke and had issue. She married secondly, William Alington, 3rd Baron Alington of Killard and had issue.
- Lady Catharine Russell, died young.
- Lady Margaret Russell (31 Aug 1656–c. 1702), married her first cousin, Edward Russell, 1st Earl of Orford.

Parliament of England
Parliament suspended since 1629	Member of Parliament for Tavistock; 1640–1641; With: John Pym	Succeeded by Hon. John Russell; John Pym
Political offices
Preceded by The Earl of Bedford	Custos Rotulorum of Devon; 1641–1642	Succeeded by The Earl of Bath
Preceded by The Earl of Bedford	Lord Lieutenant of Devon; 1637–1646 (1637–1641); With: The Earl of Bedford	English Interregnum
Preceded by Lord Herbert	Lord Lieutenant of Somerset; 1642–1646	English Interregnum
Honorary titles
Preceded by The Earl of Ailesbury	Lord Lieutenant of Bedfordshire; 1689–1700	Succeeded by Lord Edward Russell
Preceded by The Lord Dover	Lord Lieutenant of Cambridgeshire; 1689–1700	Succeeded by Lord Edward Russell
Preceded by The Earl of Clare	Lord Lieutenant of Middlesex; 1692–1700	Succeeded by Lord Edward Russell
Peerage of England
New creation	Duke of Bedford; 1694–1700	Succeeded by Wriothesley Russell
Preceded by Francis Russell	Earl of Bedford; 1641–1700	Succeeded by Wriothesley Russell
New creation	Baron Howland of Streatham; 1695–1700	Succeeded by Wriothesley Russell
