= John Russell, 7th Earl Russell =

British photographer and politician (born 1971)

The Right Honourable The Earl Russell
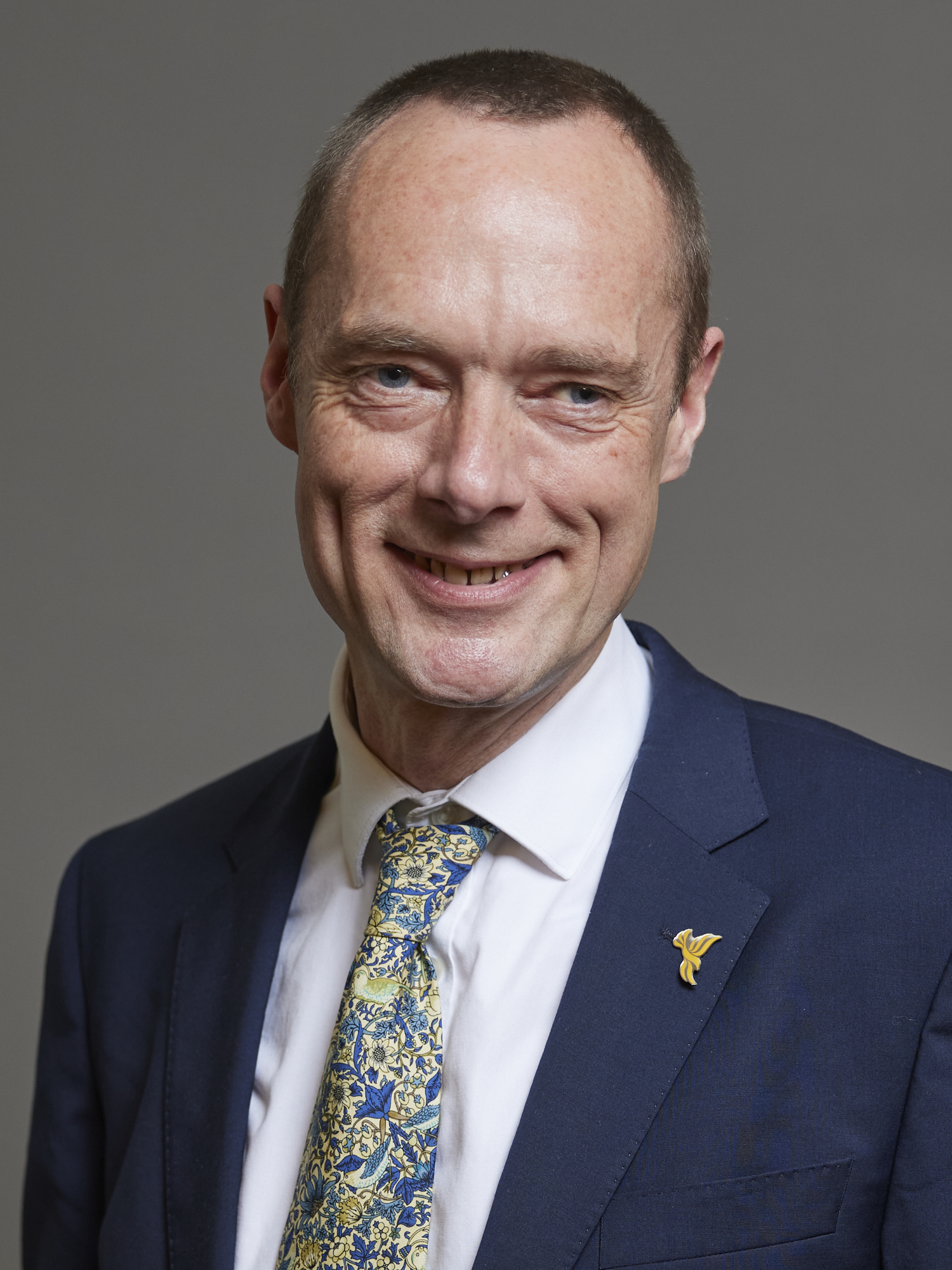
- Official portrait, 2023

Member of the House of Lords Lord Temporal
- Incumbent
- Life peerage 30 March 2026
- Elected hereditary peer 19 June 2023 – 29 April 2026
- By-election: 2023
- Preceded by: The 15th Viscount Falkland
- Succeeded by: Seat abolished

Personal details
- Born: John Francis Russell; 19 November 1971 (age 54)
- Party: Liberal Democrats
- Children: 2
- Parents: Conrad Russell, 5th Earl Russell (father); Elizabeth Sanders (mother)
- Occupation: Freelance photographer

John Francis Russell, 7th Earl Russell (born 19 November 1971), is a British politician who has sat in the House of Lords since 2023 as a member of the Liberal Democrats. A hereditary peer, Russell was made a life peer as Baron Russell of Forest Hill in 2026. A photographer by trade, he served as a councillor on Lewisham Borough Council (2006–2010) prior to entering the House of Lords.

== Early life ==
The younger son of Conrad Russell, 5th Earl Russell, a professor of history at Yale University, and his wife Elizabeth Franklin Sanders, Russell is also a grandson of the philosopher Bertrand Russell and a great-great-grandson of John Russell, 1st Earl Russell, a Liberal Prime Minister of the United Kingdom. He was educated at the William Ellis School, Highgate.

As a teenager, he took adventure training holidays at Ty'n y Berth, a Wide Horizons centre in Wales, and he later became an advocate of providing disadvantaged children with such opportunities.

== Career ==
Russell works as a freelance photographer, specializing in "political photography, event photography, charity commissions and landscapes". In 2006, he was in-house photographer for Total Politics magazine and also works for the Liberal Democrats, the London Wildlife Trust, other charities, and individuals. He publishes work at Zenfolio.

Russell became chairman of the Lewisham Liberal Democrats and was elected to serve as a Liberal Democrat councillor for Forest Hill on Lewisham Borough Council at the 2006 Lewisham London Borough Council election, going on to chair the council's Overview and Scrutiny committee. He subsequently lost his seat in 2010.

In 2012 he was his party's candidate for the Greenwich and Lewisham seat on the London Assembly.

In 2006, Russell joined the board of Wide Horizons and chaired it from 2012. It went into administration and ceased trading in 2018.

On 17 August 2014, on the death of his older brother Nicholas Russell, 6th Earl Russell, Russell succeeded as Earl Russell and Viscount Amberley, both in the Peerage of the United Kingdom.

In the 2017 general election, he stood for the Liberal Democrats in Lewisham West and Penge, finishing third of seven candidates with 6.2% of the vote, and Labour's Ellie Reeves holding the seat. At the 2022 Lewisham London Borough Council election, he again stood for election in the Forest Hill ward, and was unsuccessful, finishing eighth.

In June 2023, Russell entered the House of Lords after winning a whole house by-election to fill a vacancy among the excepted hereditary peers. As part of the 2025 Political Peerages and ahead of the House of Lords (Hereditary Peers) Act 2026 coming into effect, he was created a life peer, as Baron Russell of Forest Hill, of Forest Hill in the London Borough of Lewisham on 30 March 2026.

== Arms ==
Coat of arms of John Russell, 7th Earl Russell
Crest A goat statant argent, armed and unguled or. Escutcheon Argent, a lion rampant gules, on a chief sable, three escallops of the field, over the centre escallop a mullet. Supporters Dexter, a lion gules; sinister, an heraldic antelope gules, armed, unguled, tufted, ducally gorged and chained, the chain reflexed over the back or; each supporter charged on the shoulder with a mullet argent. Motto Che sara sara (What must be must be).

Peerage of the United Kingdom
Preceded by Nicholas Russell	Earl Russell; 2014–present	Incumbent
Parliament of the United Kingdom
Preceded by The Viscount Falkland	Elected hereditary peer to the House of Lords under the House of Lords Act 1999; 2023–2026	Position abolished under the House of Lords (Hereditary Peers) Act 2026
