= William Russell, 1st Baron Russell of Thornhaugh =

English soldier and politician, died 1613

The Right Honourable The Lord Russell
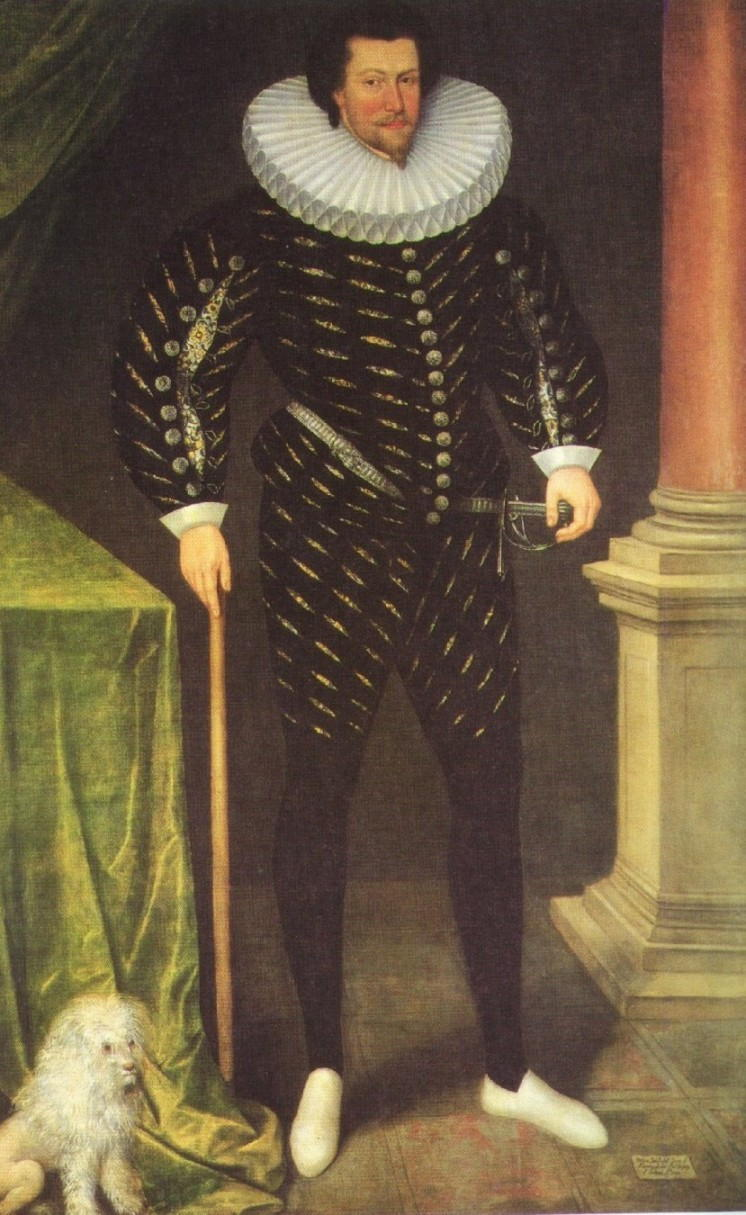
- William Russell, attributed to Marcus Gheeraerts the Younger
- Born: 1553/63
- Died: 1613
- Spouse: Elizabeth Long
- Children: Francis Russell, 4th Earl of Bedford
- Parent(s): Francis Russell, 2nd Earl of Bedford; Margaret St John

William Russell, 1st Baron Russell of Thornhaugh (died 9 August 1613) was an English nobleman, politician, peer, and knight. He was Lord Deputy of Ireland from 1594 to 1597.

He was the fourth and younger son of Francis Russell, 2nd Earl of Bedford and his first wife Margaret (née St John). His birthdate is uncertain, with some records showing that he was born as early as 1553, some as late as 1563.

He was educated at Magdalen College, Oxford, but apparently did not graduate. He spent several years in travelling through France, Germany, Italy, and Hungary. Returning to England about 1579, he was sent to Ireland in October 1580 in command of a company of recruits raised by the English clergy for the wars in Ireland. He was stationed on the Wicklow frontier to hold Fiach MacHugh O'Byrne in check, and on 4 April 1581 he and William Stanley succeeded in burning Fiagh's house of Ballinacor and killing some of his followers. He was rewarded with a lease of the abbey of Baltinglass Abbey in Co. Carlow on 4 September, and, being licensed to return to England, he was knighted by the lord-deputy, Arthur Grey, 14th Baron Grey de Wilton, on 10 September. On the occasion of the Duc d'Alençon's visit to England in November, he took part in a royal combat and fight on foot, wherein the duke and the prince dauphin were the challengers and Russell and Lord Thomas Howard the defenders.

Russell began his active military career in the Netherlands in 1585, being made lieutenant-general of cavalry. In September 1586 he distinguished himself at the Battle of Zutphen and was noted for maintaining an effective fighting force in difficult circumstances. He was appointed Governor of Flushing in 1587, but was recalled on his own initiative the following year. On 16 May 1594 he was appointed to the office of Lord Deputy of Ireland, where he served with flamboyance.

At the time, Ireland was on the point of rebellion, and there were two opinions in government on how to preserve the peace. One faction sought negotiation with the Irish rebels, while the other – including Russell – favoured military force. Russell's faction prevailed, and the rebellion grew into a general revolt, which lasted through the Nine Years War and ended with the Treaty of Mellifont in 1603. In August 1594 Russell relieved the garrison of the northern town of Enniskillen, which had been under siege for several months, but failed to capture the Irish leaders.

During his time in Ireland, Russell fell into dispute with his chief military commander, Sir John Norris. The dispute proved harmful to the crown government, and Russell was recalled to England in 1597, but only after he had captured and killed the rebel Fiach MacHugh O'Byrne.

In 1599, Russell was named as leader of the forces defending western England in anticipation of a Spanish invasion. However, the invasion plans were thwarted.

Russell built the mansion of Woburn. In the 1590s, he consulted with three Dutchmen as to the potential for draining his manor of Thorney Abbey in Cambridgeshire; his son, Francis Russell, continued the family interest in drainage and led the undertakers in the first attempt to drain the Great Level of the Fens, later known as the Bedford Level.

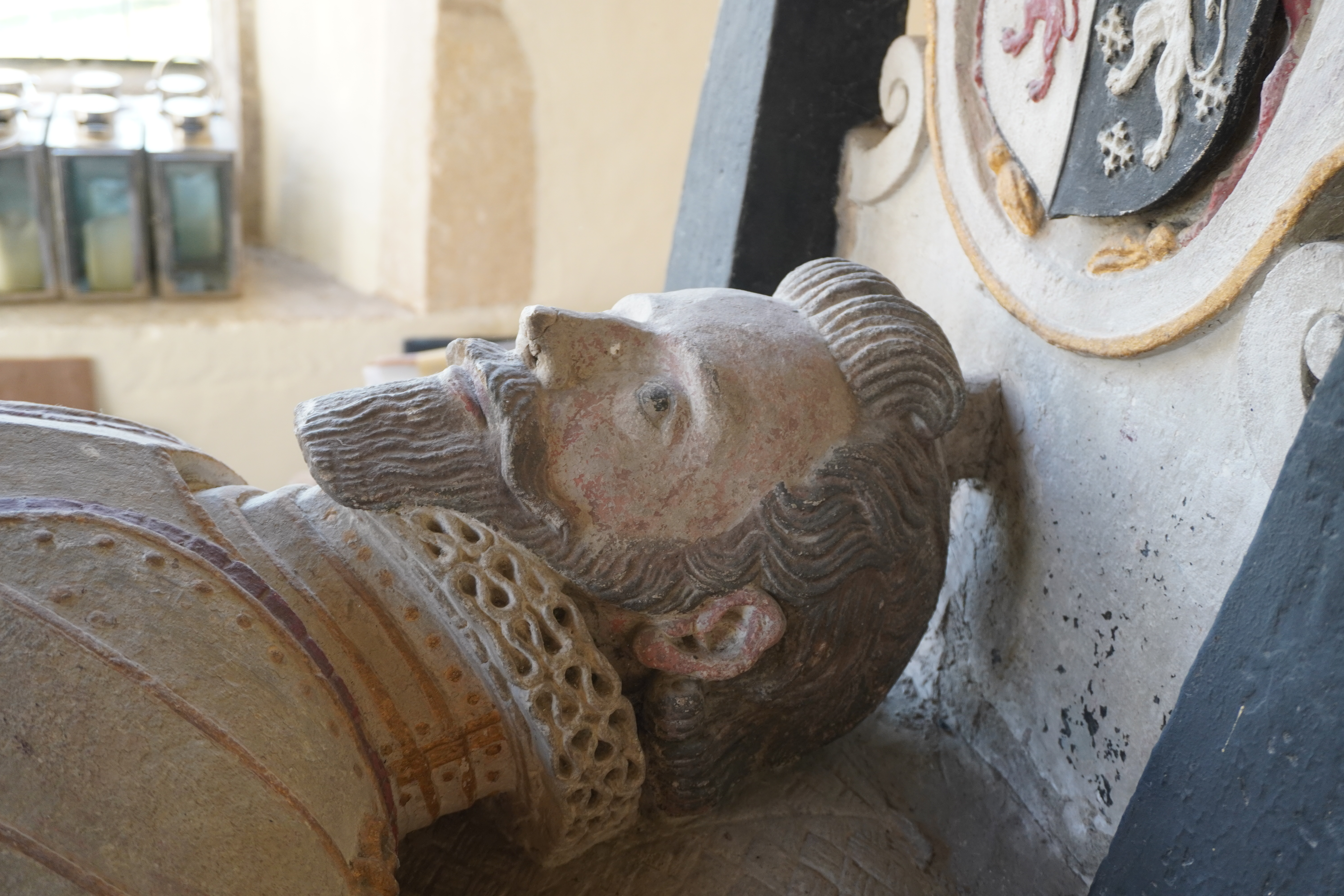
Monument to Russell in Thornhaugh Church

Russell was created Baron Russell of Thornhaugh in 1603, but he lost influence at court and retired to his estates, where he died on 9 August 1613. His tomb is in St Andrew's Church, Thornhaugh.

Russell married on 13 February 1585 at Watford, Elizabeth Long, only daughter and sole heiress of Henry Long of Shingay, Cambridgeshire, and granddaughter of Sir Richard Long. They had one son, Francis Russell, 4th Earl of Bedford. The church registers of St Mary's Church, Watford record that the child was baptised in 1587.

== Notes ==
Political offices
Preceded by William Fitzwilliam	Lord Deputy of Ireland; 1594–1597	Succeeded by Thomas Burgh
Peerage of England
New creation	Baron Russell of Thornhaugh; 1603–1613	Succeeded by Francis Russell
