= George Plantagenet, Duke of Bedford =

English prince (1477–1479)

George of York
- Duke of Bedford
- Born: March 1477; Windsor Castle, Berkshire, England
- Died: March 1479 (aged 2); Windsor Castle, Berkshire, England
- Burial: 22 March 1479; St George's Chapel, Windsor Castle
- House: York
- Father: Edward IV of England
- Mother: Elizabeth Woodville

George of York, Duke of Bedford (March 1477 – March 1479) was the eighth child and third son of Edward IV of England and Elizabeth Woodville.

George was born in Windsor Castle in March 1477, and was created Duke of Bedford in infancy, probably in 1478, after the former holder of the title, George Neville, was deprived of the title in 1478 by an act of Parliament, ostensibly for lack of money to maintain the style of a duke. He was appointed the Lord Lieutenant of Ireland in 1478, one of a series of nominal and largely absent lieutenants.

George died aged two. He was buried in St George's Chapel at Windsor Castle on 22 March 1479.
