= John Russell, 4th Earl Russell =

Son of Bertrand Russell, great-grandson of Lord John Russell

The Right Honourable The Earl Russell

Member of the House of Lords Lord Temporal
- In office 3 February 1970 – 16 December 1987; Hereditary Peerage
- Preceded by: The 3rd Earl Russell
- Succeeded by: The 5th Earl Russell

Personal details
- Born: John Conrad Russell; 16 November 1921
- Died: 16 December 1987 (aged 66)
- Spouse: Susan Doniphan Lindsay
- Children: Felicity Anne Russell, Sarah Elizabeth Russell, Lucy Catherine Russell
- Parent(s): Bertrand Russell; Dora Black
- Education: Dartington Hall School; University of California; Harvard University

John Conrad Russell, 4th Earl Russell (16 November 1921 – 16 December 1987), styled Viscount Amberley from 1931 to 1970, was the eldest son of the philosopher and mathematician Bertrand Russell (the 3rd Earl) and his second wife, Dora Black. His middle name was a tribute to the writer Joseph Conrad, whom his father had long admired. He was a great-grandson of the 19th-century British Whig Prime Minister Lord John Russell. He succeeded to the earldom on the death of his father on 2 February 1970.

== Education ==
John Russell was educated at the progressive Dartington Hall School, the University of California, Los Angeles and Harvard University. Upon leaving Harvard in 1943 he returned to Britain and enlisted in the Royal Naval Volunteer Reserve. In the Reserve, he learned the Japanese language.

== Career ==
Russell had a distinguished early career, working for the FAO among other organisations, but in later life he was diagnosed as schizophrenic. This made him the only person in the United Kingdom to be denied the vote on two counts, first, for being a peer and, second, for being insane. He delivered a speech in the House of Lords on 18 July 1978 that was considered so outlandish that it was claimed to be the only speech unrecorded by Hansard, although it is included in the online version while lacking the final section that he had written but failed to read aloud after being interrupted.

== Personal life ==
He was married on 28 August 1946 to Susan Doniphan Lindsay, daughter of the American poet Vachel Lindsay. They were divorced in 1955. John Russell adopted Susan's daughter with another partner, who became Lady Felicity Anne Russell (born 2 September 1945). John Russell and Susan had two daughters together, Lady Sarah Elizabeth Russell (born 16 January 1946), and Lady Lucy Catherine Russell (21 July 1948 – 11 April 1975). Neither Sarah nor Lucy married or bore children; Felicity had one daughter, Rowan. Like their father and mother, the daughters suffered from mental illnesses. Lucy, who was Bertrand Russell's favourite grandchild, died from self-immolation, at the age of 26, in the forecourt of a church near Penzance, ostensibly protesting in the cause of world peace. Like her father, Lucy was diagnosed with schizophrenia.

Russell was succeeded as Earl by his half-brother, the historian Conrad Russell, 5th Earl Russell.

== Arms ==
Coat of arms of John Russell, 4th Earl Russell
| Crest A goat statant argent, armed and unguled or. Escutcheon Argent, a lion rampant gules, on a chief sable, three escallops of the field, over the centre escallop a mullet. Supporters Dexter, a lion gules; sinister, an heraldic antelope gules, armed, unguled, tufted, ducally gorged and chained, the chain reflexed over the back or; each supporter charged on the shoulder with a mullet argent. Motto Che sara sara (What must be must be). |

== Bibliography ==
- Monk, Ray (2004). "Russell, Bertrand Arthur William, third Earl Russell (1872–1970)". Oxford Dictionary of National Biography (online ed.). Oxford University Press. doi:10.1093/ref:odnb/35875. (Subscription, Wikipedia Library access or UK public library membership required.)

Peerage of the United Kingdom
| Preceded by Bertrand Russell | Earl Russell; 1970–1987 | Succeeded by Conrad Russell |
