= Nicholas Russell, 6th Earl Russell =

British earl and politician (1968–2014)

The Right Honourable The Earl Russell

Personal details
- Born: Nicholas Lyulph Russell; 12 September 1968 Wimbledon, London, England
- Died: 17 August 2014 (aged 45) London, England
- Domestic partner: Georgina Farrer (2005–2014)
- Parent(s): Conrad Russell, 5th Earl Russell; Elizabeth Sanders
- Education: Lancaster University
- Occupation: Campaigner, politician

Nicholas Lyulph Russell, 6th Earl Russell (12 September 1968 – 17 August 2014), styled Viscount Amberley between 1987 and 2004, was the elder son of Conrad Russell, 5th Earl Russell and Elizabeth Russell (formerly Elizabeth Sanders). He succeeded to the Earldom of Russell on his father's death on 14 October 2004.

Like his grandfather, Bertrand Russell, he was an active member of the Campaign for Nuclear Disarmament, from his teenage years until his death.

By the House of Lords Act 1999, all but 92 hereditary peers were removed from the House of Lords – the abolition of which Russell advocated so he did not sit in the Lords.

== Early life ==
Born in Wimbledon, London, on 12 September 1968, Russell was educated at William Ellis School in North London and studied politics at the University of Lancaster.

== Career ==
Russell was the disability rights campaigner for the Labour Party and was campaigns officer for the Royal National Institute of the Blind as well as co-chairman and later sole chairman of DANDA:Developmental Adult Neurodiversity Association, an entirely user-led and user-run organisation, two of whose members and trustee-directors successfully asked the Disability Rights Commission (DRC) to set up a Neurodiversity Group, which was succeeded by the DRC Neurodiversity and Autism Action Group (NAAG), the only systematic human rights examination of Neurodivergent Rights in the world to date by an official human rights body of national or international standing, reporting in 2007. He also trained the Metropolitan Police Service. He was a regional board member of the Co-operative Group and was active in the Co-operative Party, as well as SERA and Transport 2000.

He was also a longstanding national executive member of the Socialist Educational Association.

He was actively involved in Disability Labour and was a former chairman of the group. He was Disability Labour's first representative on the Labour Party's National Policy Forum, the National Executive Committee's equalities sub-committee and the Socialist Societies executive.

On 7 May 2010, Russell was elected as Labour councillor for the Cann Hall ward of Waltham Forest London Borough Council, a position he held for a four-year term until May 2014.

== Personal life and death ==
He lived with his fiancée Georgina Farrer in Leytonstone, until his sudden death from a presumed heart attack on 17 August 2014, aged 45. A post mortem later confirmed the cause of death to have been due to thrombosis.

== Arms ==
Coat of arms of Nicholas Russell, 6th Earl Russell
Crest A goat statant argent, armed and unguled or. Escutcheon Argent, a lion rampant gules, on a chief sable, three escallops of the field, over the centre escallop a mullet. Supporters Dexter, a lion gules; sinister, an heraldic antelope gules, armed, unguled, tufted, ducally gorged and chained, the chain reflexed over the back or; each supporter charged on the shoulder with a mullet argent. Motto Che sara sara (What must be must be).

Peerage of the United Kingdom
Preceded by Conrad Russell	Earl Russell; 2004–2014	Succeeded by John Russell
