= Francis Russell, 4th Earl of Bedford =

English nobleman and politician

The Right Honourable The Earl of Bedford PC
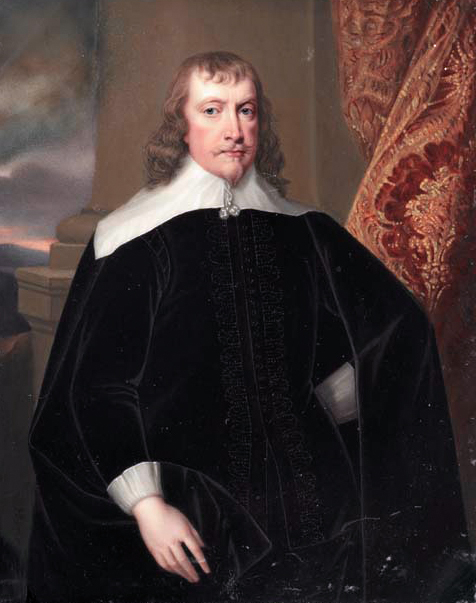
- Born: 1587
- Died: 9 May 1641 (aged 53–54)
- Spouse: Catherine Brydges
- Children: 8, including: William Russell, 1st Duke of Bedford; Colonel John Russell
- Parent(s): William Russell, 1st Baron Russell of Thornhaugh; Elizabeth Long

Francis Russell, 4th Earl of Bedford PC (1587 – 9 May 1641) was an English nobleman and politician. He built the square of Covent Garden, with the piazza and St Paul's Church, employing Inigo Jones as his architect. He is also known for his pioneering project to drain The Fens of Cambridgeshire.

== Early life ==
He was the only son of William Russell, 1st Baron Russell of Thornhaugh and his wife Elizabeth Long, to which barony he succeeded in August 1613. For a short time previously he had been Member of Parliament for the borough of Lyme Regis. In 1623 he was made Lord Lieutenant of Devon and on 3 May 1627 became Earl of Bedford on the death of his cousin Edward Russell, 3rd Earl of Bedford.

In 1621 Russell was one of the thirty-three peers who petitioned James I on the prejudice caused to the English peerage by the lavish grant of Irish and Scottish titles of nobility. In 1628, during the debates on the Petition of Right, he supported the demands of the House of Commons, and was a member of the committee which reported against the king's right to imprison. In May he was sent down to Devon, ostensibly to assist in refitting the fleet returned from Rochelle, but according to report, on account of his opposition in the House of Lords. Bedford was one of the three peers implicated in the circulation of Sir Robert Dudley's Proposition for His Majesty s Service (the others being William Seymour, Earl of Hertford, John Holles, 1st Earl of Clare and Sir Robert Cotton, 1st Baronet, of Connington), was arrested on 5 November 1629, and was brought before the Star-chamber. The prosecution, however, was dropped when the real nature of the paper was discovered, and Bedford was quickly released.

== Politician of the parliamentary crisis ==
The Short Parliament meeting in April 1640 found the earl as one of King Charles I leading opponents. He was greatly trusted by John Pym and Oliver St John, and is mentioned by Clarendon as among the "great contrivers and designers" in the House of Lords. In July 1640 he was among the peers who wrote to the Scottish leaders refusing to invite a Scottish army into England, but promising to stand by the Scots in all legal and honourable ways. His signature was afterwards forged by Thomas, Viscount Savile, in order to encourage the Scots to invade England. In the following September he was among those peers who urged Charles to call a parliament, to make peace with the Scots, and to dismiss his obnoxious ministers; and was one of the English commissioners appointed to conclude the Treaty of Ripon.

When the Long Parliament met in November 1640, Bedford was generally regarded as the leader of the parliamentarians. In February 1641 he was made a privy councillor, and during the course of some negotiations was promised the office of Lord High Treasurer. He was essentially a moderate man, and seemed anxious to settle the question of the royal revenue in a satisfactory manner. He did not wish to alter the government of the church, was on good terms with Archbishop Laud, and, although convinced of the guilt of Strafford, was anxious to save his life. In the midst of the parliamentary struggle, Bedford died of smallpox on 9 May 1641.

Clarendon described him as "a wise man, and of too great and plentiful a fortune to wish the subversion of the government", and again referring to his death, said that "many who knew him well thought his death not unseasonable as well to his fame as his fortune, and that it rescued him as well from some possible guilt as from those visible misfortunes which men of all conditions have since undergone".

== Estate development ==
In about 1631 with architect Inigo Jones, he built the square of Covent Garden, with the piazza and St Paul's, Covent Garden. He was threatened with a Star-chamber suit for contravening the proclamation against new buildings, but the matter seems to have been resolved by compromise.

Bedford was the head of those who undertook to drain the great level of The Fens of Cambridgeshire, which were renamed the "Bedford Level" in his honour. He and the other undertakers were to receive 95,000 acres of land, of which 12,000 were to be set apart for the king, and the profits of 40,000 were to serve as a security for keeping up the drainage works. He spent a large sum of money on this work, and received 43,000 acres (174 km^{2}) of land; but the project involved him in great difficulties. By 1637 he had spent £100,000 on the undertaking but after various jealousies and difficulties, the king took the work into his own hands in 1638, making a further grant of land to the Earl. The work was not declared finished till March 1653, twelve years after Bedford's death.

== Marriage and children ==
Bedford married Catherine Brydges (d. 1657), daughter of Giles Brydges, 3rd Baron Chandos and Frances Clinton. They lived at Corney House, Corney Reach, Chiswick. They had eight children:

- William Russell, 1st Duke of Bedford (August 1616 – 7 September 1700).
- Francis Russell (d. circa April 1641).
- Colonel John Russell
- Edward Russell (d. 21 September 1665). Father by his wife Penelope Hill of Edward Russell, 1st Earl of Orford.
- Catherine Russell (d. 1 December 1676). Married Robert Greville, 2nd Baron Brooke.
- Margaret Russell (d. 1676). Married first James Hay, 2nd Earl of Carlisle and secondly Edward Montagu, 2nd Earl of Manchester.
- Anne Russell (d. 26 January 1697). Married George Digby, 2nd Earl of Bristol.
- Diana Russell (d. 30 January 1695). Married Francis Newport, 1st Earl of Bradford.

Lord Bedford died of smallpox in 1641 at the age of 48 and is buried in the 'Bedford Chapel' at St Michael's, Chenies. Lady Bedford remained at Corney House until her death in 1657. Her son Edward inherited the house and later built Bedford House nearby.

Political offices
Preceded by The 3rd Earl of Bedford	Custos Rotulorum of Devon; 1619–1641; With: Lord Russell 1637–1641	Succeeded by The 5th Earl of Bedford
Preceded by The Earl of Bath	Lord Lieutenant of Devon; 1623–1641; With: Lord Russell 1637–1641	Succeeded by The 5th Earl of Bedford
Peerage of England
Preceded by Edward Russell	Earl of Bedford; 1627–1641	Succeeded by William Russell
Preceded by William Russell	Baron Russell of Thornhaugh; 1613–1641	Succeeded by William Russell
