= George Boyle =

George Boyle may refer to:

- George Boyle (priest) (1828–1901), Dean of Salisbury
- George Boyle, 4th Earl of Glasgow (1766–1843), Scottish politician
- George Boyle, 6th Earl of Glasgow (1825–1890), Scottish politician
- George Frederick Boyle (1886–1948), Australian-American musician
- George Boyle (drag queen) (born 1996), English drag queen

== See also ==
- George Boyle White (1802–1876), Australian politician
- George Hanna (MP for East Antrim) (George Boyle Hanna, 1877–1938), Northern Irish politician
- George Hanna (Belfast MP) (George Boyle Hanna, 1906–1964), Northern Irish politician
- William George Boyle (1830–1908), British soldier and politician
