= David Boyle, 9th Earl of Glasgow =

British nobleman and naval officer (1910–1984)

Rear-Admiral The Right Honourable The Earl of Glasgow CB DSC DL
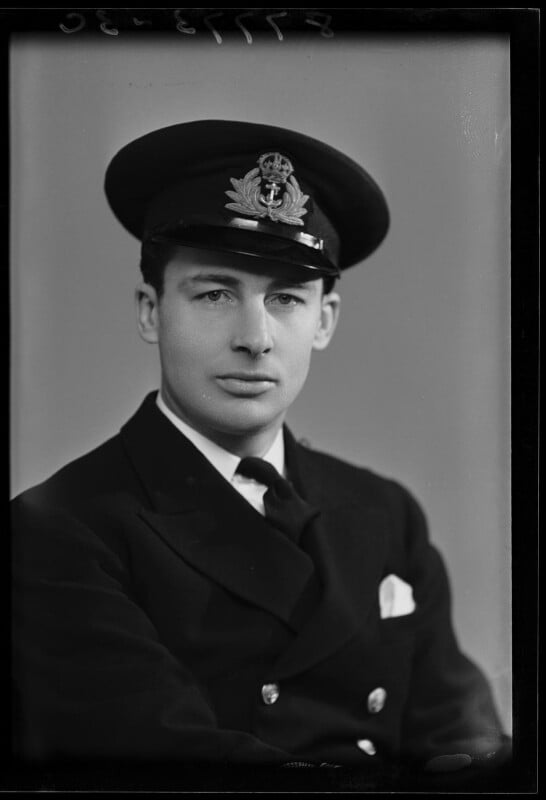
- Boyle in 1941
- Born: 24 July 1910
- Died: 8 June 1984 (aged 73)
- Military career
- Allegiance: United Kingdom
- Branch: Royal Navy
- Rank: Rear admiral
- Commands: HMS Actaeon; Malta Dockyard
- Conflicts: World War II
- Awards: Companion of the Order of the Bath; Distinguished Service Cross

Rear-Admiral David William Maurice Boyle, 9th Earl of Glasgow, CB, DSC, DL (24 July 1910 – 8 June 1984), was a British nobleman and a Royal Navy officer. He was Chief of the Name and Arms of Boyle.

== Naval career ==
Educated at Eton College, Boyle entered the Royal Navy and fought in the Second World War during which he was awarded the Distinguished Service Cross. By the end of the war he had achieved the rank of commander and commanded the Black Swan-class sloop HMS Actaeon. Promoted to captain in 1952, he became Captain of the Fleet, Home Fleet, in March 1957, Commodore, Royal Naval Barracks, Portsmouth, in September 1959 and Flag Officer, Malta, in July 1961. He retired in July 1963 as a rear admiral.

== Family ==
In 1937 he married Dorothea Lyle (1914–2006), and had three children with her:

- Patrick Robin Archibald Boyle, 10th Earl of Glasgow
- Lady Sarah Dorothea Boyle
- Lady Nichola Jane Eleanora Boyle

He divorced his first wife in 1962 and remarried the same year to Ursula Vanda Maud Vivian (1912–1984), daughter of the 4th Baron Vivian.

Military offices
Preceded by Derick Hetherington	Flag Officer, Malta; 1961–1963	Vacant Title next held by Dudley Davenport
Peerage of Scotland
Preceded by Patrick Boyle	Earl of Glasgow; 1963–1984	Succeeded by Patrick Boyle
Peerage of the United Kingdom
Preceded by Patrick Boyle	Baron Fairlie; 1963–1984; Member of the House of Lords (1964–1984)	Succeeded by Patrick Boyle
