= Clan Boyle =

Scottish Lowland clan

- Crest: A double headed eagle displayed, parted per pale embattled Gules and Argent
- Motto: Dominus providebit ("The Lord will provide.")

Profile
- Region: Lowlands
- District: North Ayrshire

Chief
- The Rt. Hon. Patrick Boyle
- The 10th Earl of Glasgow
- Seat: Kelburn Castle

Clan Boyle is a Scottish clan of the Scottish Lowlands.

== History ==
=== Origins of the clan ===
The name Boyle comes from the Norman town of Beuville near Caen. In 1164 David de Boivil appears as a witness to a charter. In 1275 Richard de Boyville held the lands of Kelburn in Ayrshire. In around 1291 Henry de Boyville was keeper of Dumfries Castle, Wigtown Castle and Kirkcudbright Castle. Richard de Boyvil and Robert de Boyvil both appear on the Ragman Rolls in 1296 submitting to Edward I of England. Richard Boyle married a daughter of Sir Robert Comyn.

=== 15th and 16th centuries ===
Six generations after Richard Boyle, John Boyle, his descendant, was killed at the Battle of Sauchieburn, fighting in support of James III of Scotland in 1488. The family estates were forfeited but his son, also called John, had them restored by James IV of Scotland.

When Elizabeth I was on the throne of England, the Boyles supported Mary, Queen of Scots.

=== 17th and 18th centuries ===
During the 17th century the Boyles supported Charles I of England and they suffered hardships as a result. However the family fortunes were later restored when John Boyle of Kelburn was elected as a Commissioner of Parliament. John's eldest son, David Boyle also became a Commissioner of Parliament and Privy Councillor. In 1699 David was raised to the Peerage as Lord Boyle of Kelburn. In 1703 he was created Earl of Glasgow. He was also one of the commissioners for the Treaty of Union. During the Jacobite rising of 1715 he was a staunch supporter of the British-Hanoverian government and even raised and armed troops at his own expense.

John Boyle, 3rd Earl of Glasgow followed a military career and he was wounded at the Battle of Fontenoy in 1745 and later again at the Battle of Lauffeld in 1747. He was appointed Lord High Commissioner to the General Assembly of the Church of Scotland and held the office for nine consecutive years.

=== 19th century ===
David Boyle, a grandson of the second Earl, was a distinguished solicitor and in 1807 was appointed Solicitor General for Scotland. He was raised to the bench, and in 1841 was appointed Lord Justice General. He retired in 1852 after forty-one years of legal service.

George Boyle, 4th Earl, also took up military service, rising to colonel and Lord Lieutenant of Renfrewshire in 1810. His eldest son, John, was a naval officer captured by the French off Gibraltar in 1807. His brother, James, succeeded as the fifth Earl in 1843. He had also served in the Royal Navy and was also made Lord Lieutenant of Renfrewshire.

James was succeeded by his half brother, George Frederick Boyle, which proved to be a disaster for the family. George Boyle had been educated at Oxford and was passionately interested in art and architecture. He became obsessed by the Pre-Raphaelite notions of form and beauty and began a monumental building program, renovating Kelburn and funding churches across Scotland. In 1888 he had bankrupted the estate and the assets were sold, Kelburn was only saved by the purse of his cousin, David, later to become the David Boyle, 7th Earl of Glasgow.

David Boyle, succeeded as Earl in 1890 and was Governor of New Zealand from 1892 to 1897. In 1897 he was created Baron Fairlie and was raised to the Peerage of the United Kingdom. (the Earldom of Glasgow and all other titles being in the Peerage of Scotland. This was done to ensure him a seat on the House of Lords as, at that time, only a small number of Scottish peers could sit, known as Scottish representative peer.

== Clan Boyle today ==
The current chief of the clan and 10th Earl of Glasgow was a naval reserve officer and assistant TV director who succeeded his father in 1984. He resides in Kelburn Castle, which has been held by the family since the 13th century.

== Clan castles ==
- Kelburn Castle is the seat of Patrick Boyle, 10th Earl of Glasgow.
- Rowallan Castle

== See also ==
- Scottish Clan
