= Earl of Glasgow =

Scottish peerage title

- Quarterly, 1st and 4th: or a double headed eagle displayed gules, armed and beaked azure; 2nd and 3rd: parted per bend embattled argent and gules; over all an escutcheon or, charged with three stag's horns gules
- Creation date: 12 April 1703
- Created by: Anne of Scotland
- Peerage: Peerage of Scotland
- First holder: David Boyle, Lord Boyle
- Present holder: Patrick Boyle, 10th Earl of Glasgow
- Heir apparent: David Boyle, Viscount Kelburn
- Remainder to: Heirs male whatsoever
- Subsidiary titles: Viscount Kelburn; Baron Fairlie; Lord Boyle of Kelburn, Stewartoun, Cumbrae, Finnick, Largs and Dalry; Lord Boyle of Stewartoun, Cumbraes, Fenwick, Largs and Dalry
- Seat: Kelburn Castle
- Former seat: Stanely Castle
- Motto: Dominus providebit ("The Lord will provide")

Earl of Glasgow is a title in the Peerage of Scotland. It was created in 1703 for David Boyle, Lord Boyle.

The first earl was subsequently one of the commissioners who negotiated the Treaty of Union uniting the Kingdom of England and the Kingdom of Scotland into the Kingdom of Great Britain. He had already been created Lord Boyle of Kelburn, Stewartoun, Cumbrae, Finnick, Largs and Dalry in 1699, and was made Lord Boyle of Stewartoun, Cumbraes, Fenwick, Largs and Dalry and Viscount Kelburn at the same time as he was granted the earldom. These titles are also in the Peerage of Scotland.

The fourth Earl was in 1815 created Baron Ross, of Hawkhead in the County of Renfrew, in the Peerage of the United Kingdom, a title that became extinct on the death of the sixth Earl in 1890. The seventh Earl served as Governor of New Zealand from 1892 to 1897 and was created Baron Fairlie, of Fairlie in the County of Ayr, in the Peerage of the United Kingdom, in 1897.

Brigadier Bernard Fergusson, Baron Ballantrae, and journalist Sir James Fergusson, 8th Baronet, were both grandsons of the 7th Earl.

The Earl of Glasgow is the hereditary Clan Chief of Clan Boyle.

The family seat is Kelburn Castle in Ayrshire, Scotland.

== Earl of Glasgow (1703) ==
- David Boyle, 1st Earl of Glasgow (1666–1733)
- John Boyle, 2nd Earl of Glasgow (1688–1740)
- John Boyle, 3rd Earl of Glasgow (1714–1775)
- George Boyle, 4th Earl of Glasgow (1766–1843) (created Baron Ross [UK] in 1815)
  - John Boyle, Lord Boyle (1789–1818)
- James Carr-Boyle, 5th Earl of Glasgow (1792–1869)
- George Frederick Boyle, 6th Earl of Glasgow (1825–1890)
- David Boyle, 7th Earl of Glasgow (1833–1915) (created Baron Fairlie [UK] in 1897)
- Patrick James Boyle, 8th Earl of Glasgow (1874–1963)
- David William Maurice Boyle, 9th Earl of Glasgow (1910–1984)
- Patrick Robin Archibald Boyle, 10th Earl of Glasgow (born 1939)

The heir apparent is the present holder's son, David Michael Douglas Boyle, Viscount Kelburn (born 1978).

=== Title succession chart ===
Title succession chart, Earls of Glasgow.

David Boyle; 1st Earl of Glasgow; 1666–1733
John Boyle; 2nd Earl of Glasgow; 1688–1740
John Boyle; 3rd Earl of Glasgow; 1714–1775	Rev. Patrick Boyle; 1717–1798
Baron Ross (1815, UK)
George Boyle; 4th Earl of Glasgow; 1766–1843	David Boyle; Lord Boyle; 1772–1853
John Boyle; Lord Boyle; 1789–1818	James Carr-Boyle; 5th Earl of Glasgow; 1792–1869	Hon. William Boyle; 1802–1819	George Boyle; 6th Earl of Glasgow; 1825–1890	Patrick Boyle; 1806–1874
Ross barony extinct
Baron Fairlie (1897, UK)
David Boyle; 7th Earl of Glasgow; 1833–1915
Patrick Boyle; 8th Earl of Glasgow; 1874–1963
David Boyle; 9th Earl of Glasgow; 1910–1984
Patrick Boyle; 10th Earl of Glasgow born 1939
David Boyle; Viscount Kelburn born 1978

== See also ==
- Clan Boyle
