= Countess Russell =

Countess Russell may refer to:

- Elizabeth von Arnim (1866–1941), wife of Frank Russell, second Earl Russell
- Dora Russell (1894–1986), second wife of philosopher Bertrand Russell
- Frances Russell, Countess Russell (1815–1898), second wife of Prime Minister John Russell
- Patricia Russell (1910–2004), third wife of philosopher Bertrand Russell

== See also ==
- Anne Russell, Countess of Bedford (1615–1684), wife of William Russell, 5th Earl of Bedford
- Anne Russell, Countess of Warwick (1548/1549–1604), third wife of Ambrose Dudley, 3rd Earl of Warwick
