= HMS Birmingham (C19) =

Town-class cruiser

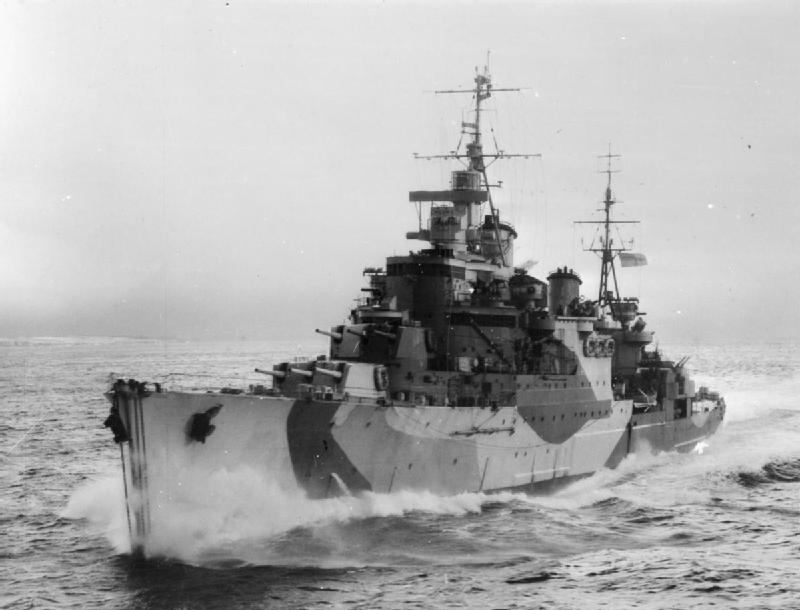
- Birmingham in 1943

History

United Kingdom
- Name: Birmingham
- Builder: HM Dockyard, Devonport
- Laid down: 18 July 1935
- Launched: 1 September 1936
- Commissioned: 18 November 1937
- Out of service: 3 December 1959
- Fate: Broken up in 1960

General characteristics
- Class & type: Town-class light cruiser
- Displacement: 9,100 tons standard; 11,350 tons full load
- Length: 591 ft (180 m) overall
- Beam: 61 ft 8 in (18.80 m)
- Draught: 21 ft 6 in (6.55 m)
- Installed power: Four Admiralty 3-drum boilers; 75,000 shp (56,000 kW)
- Propulsion: 4 shafts; 4 geared steam turbines
- Speed: 32 knots (59 km/h; 37 mph)
- Complement: 748
- Armament: 12 × 6-inch (152 mm) Mk XXIII guns [triple mounts]; 8 × QF 4-inch (102 mm) Mk XVI guns [double mounts]; 4 × 3-pounder; 8 × QF 2-pounder (40 mm) AA guns [quadruple mounts]; Torpedo tubes: 6 × 21-inch (533 mm)
- Notes: Pennant number C19

HMS Birmingham was a member of the first group of five ships of the Town class light cruisers.

== Early career ==
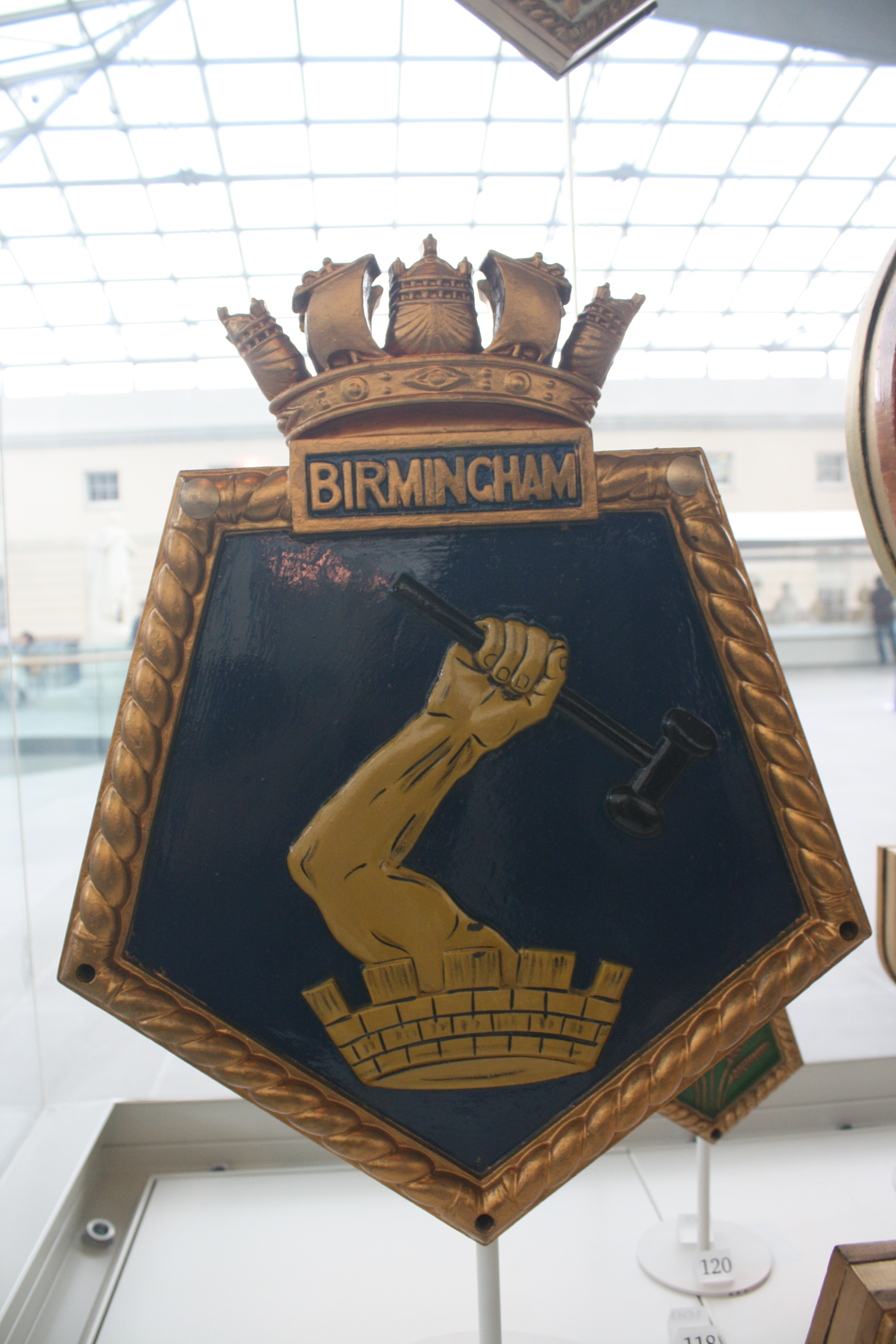
Ship's badge in the National Maritime Museum

Birmingham initially joined the 5th Cruiser Squadron on the China Station in January 1938. On the outbreak of World War II in September 1939, she left for Malta for a refit before joining the Home Fleet in March–April 1940. Birmingham was a unit of the 18th Cruiser Squadron of the Home Fleet, initially used to patrol off the coast of Norway to prevent German fishing vessels operating in this area. In mid-April Birmingham, Manchester and Cairo escorted a troop convoy to Norway. On 26 April she shelled and sank the German patrol boat Schiff 37 after Schiff 37 rammed and damaged the destroyer Arrow off Norway. In May, Birmingham, in company with Manchester, evacuated 1,500 troops from Åndalsnes. She returned to the UK and was in refit between September–December 1940.

From January until April 1941 Birmingham escorted troop convoys to the Middle East, around the Cape of Good Hope. In May she returned to home waters, and was involved in the hunt for the German battleship Bismarck and heavy cruiser Prinz Eugen. Birmingham had already put to sea from Scapa Flow on a patrol of the Iceland-Faroes passage, and did not end up engaging the German ships. Birmingham then escorted convoy WS-9A from the UK to South Africa arriving on 4 July 1941. Whilst in South African waters, she docked in the Selborne dry dock at Simon's Town for a minor refit, where she was fitted with the Mk 284 and 291 radars and several new anti-aircraft weapons.

== In the Mediterranean and home waters ==
On completion in February 1942, Birmingham was transferred to the Eastern Fleet, returning to South Africa in March. In June she was reassigned to operate in the Mediterranean as a member of the 4th Cruiser Squadron under Rear Admiral Tennant. She was part of the covering force for the double convoy operation codenamed Operations "Harpoon" and "Vigorous" from Gibraltar and Alexandria to supply the island of Malta. In March, she was attacked and damaged by 15 Ju 87 from Sturzkampfgeschwader 3 and Italian Cant 1007 aircraft. Though they failed to hit Birmingham directly, she was damaged by several near misses. In September she returned to the Indian Ocean and was involved in the British operation to occupy Madagascar, codenamed Operation "Stream". In November Birmingham escorted a convoy to Mahajanga West Coast where the 10th Infantry Brigade was landed under air cover provided by the aircraft carrier Illustrious.

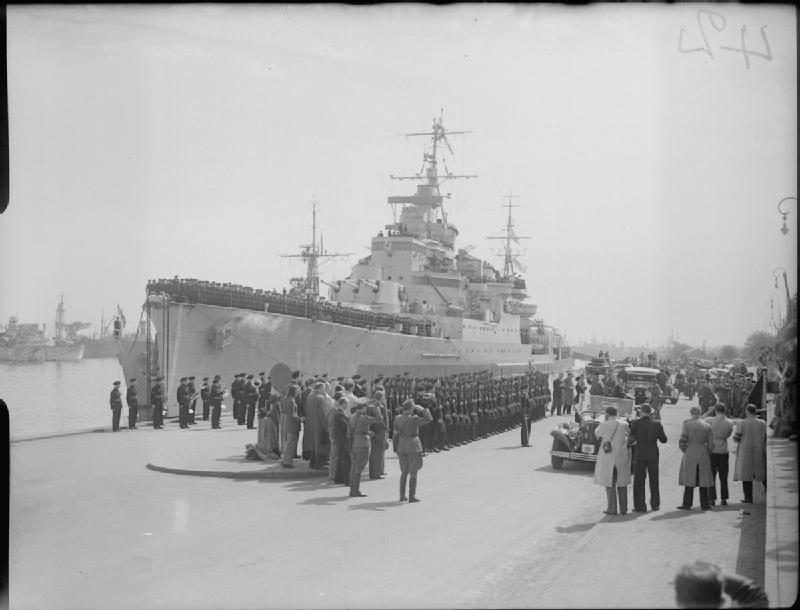
Field Marshal Montgomery saluting from his car while passing down a quayside lined with a Royal Marine Guard of honour from Birmingham. The Field Marshal had just landed at Copenhagen, Denmark following its liberation by British forces. Birmingham is moored to the quayside and her crew line the decks

In April 1943 Birmingham was again refitted in the UK, a process completed in October. She returned to the Mediterranean and on 28 November was torpedoed by the German submarine U-407 off the coast of Cyrenaica. The torpedo struck the keel, in line with the 'B' turret and right under the seaman boys' mess deck, killing about seventy men in that compartment. Seriously damaged, and with her bow almost severed, she succeeded in returning to Alexandria where temporary repairs were carried out. In June 1944, she sailed for the United States where more permanent repairs were carried out. 'X' 6 inch turret was removed and replaced by 16 (4x4) Bofors 40 mm gun plus an increase to 27 (10x2, 7x1) Oerlikon 20 mm cannon. In November 1944, the repairs were completed and she returned to home waters to join the 10th Cruiser Squadron at Scapa Flow.

In May 1945, as the war drew to a close, a force consisting of the cruisers Birmingham, Dido and several destroyers was tasked with occupying ports in the Baltic. The force passed through the German mine barrage off the Skagerrak, reaching Copenhagen on 9 May, taking control of the German cruisers Prinz Eugen and Nürnberg after their surrender. On 13 May Birmingham was relieved by the cruiser Devonshire and she returned to the UK.

== Postwar career ==
In 1948 Birmingham was transferred to the South Atlantic Command. On 4 January 1947, she embarked the departing governor of Burma on its independence. She served in the East Indies Fleet with the 4th Cruiser Squadron between 1949 and 1950. During 1950 and 1952 Birmingham underwent a modernisation, receiving new bridgework, a lattice foremast and air conditioning rendering her suitable for service in the Far East. To control the 4" A/A armament, she was given 2 – Mk 6 high angle directors at the corners of the former aircraft hangar. Her armament now consisted of 9 (3x3) 6 inch guns, 16 (4x4) 4 inch guns and 18 (6x2 & 6x1) Bofors 40 mm gun. This was her last modernisation as she was considered to be too old to justify any major modernisation. After this refit she was transferred to the Far East Fleet, where she was a member of the 5th Cruiser Squadron. She became involved in the Korean War where she expended 1,051 six-inch shells. In June 1952 as the Panmunjom (Korea) negotiations moved belatedly towards an armistice, Birmingham, along with the cruiser Newcastle and two frigates, supported American landing craft evacuating thousands of friendly Koreans from islands off the north-west coast. An armistice was finally reached in June 1953. In June 1954, Birmingham returned home from the Far East.

In 1955 Birmingham was transferred to the Mediterranean Fleet, where she was the flagship of the 1st Cruiser Squadron. The 1956 film The Baby and the Battleship was filmed aboard her. During the same year she was in the Mediterranean, Birmingham also took part in the film Battle of the River Plate starring Anthony Quayle and Peter Finch. The visible presence in the wardroom of a full-frontal painted nude, The Bane, painted in 1931 by Birmingham artist Bernard Fleetwood-Walker and loaned to the ship by Birmingham Museum and Art Gallery, caused some discussion at the Cannes Film Festival of 1957.

In June 1957, she was one of seven warships involved in an exercise off the Turkish Black Sea ports under the Commander in Chief of the Mediterranean Fleet, Admiral Sir Ralph Edwards — the exercises led to a strong protest from the Soviet government. In May 1959 whilst operating off Malta, Birmingham was involved in a collision with the destroyer Delight which caused the deaths of two sailors who were overcome by fumes while inspecting areas below Birmingham's waterline for damage.

== Decommissioning and disposal ==
Birmingham was paid off at HMNB Devonport on 3 December 1959. By this time she was the last of her class in service. She was broken up in September 1960 by Thos. W. Ward, of Inverkeithing. Her badge is still visible on the Selborne Graving Dock wall at Simon's Town, South Africa.
