= Admiral Boyle =

Admiral Boyle may refer to:

- Alexander Boyle (1810–1884), British Royal Navy vice admiral
- Algernon Boyle (1871–1949), British Royal Navy vice admiral
- Courtenay Boyle (1770–1844), British Royal Navy vice admiral
- Douglas Boyle (1923–2001), Canadian Forces vice admiral
- Edward Courtney Boyle (1883–1967), British Royal Navy rear admiral
- Michael E. Boyle (born 1965), U.S. Navy rear admiral
- William Boyle, 12th Earl of Cork (1873–1967), British Royal Navy admiral
