= German ship Hipper =

A number of vessels of the German Navy have borne the name Hipper, after Franz von Hipper.

- German cruiser Admiral Hipper, an Admiral Hipper-class cruiser, in service 1939–1945.
- German frigate Hipper (F214), a Black Swan-class sloop converted to a training ship, in service between 1958–1967.
