= Stanely Castle =

Castle in Renfrewshire, Scotland, UK

Coordinates: 55°49′24″N 4°27′14.5″W

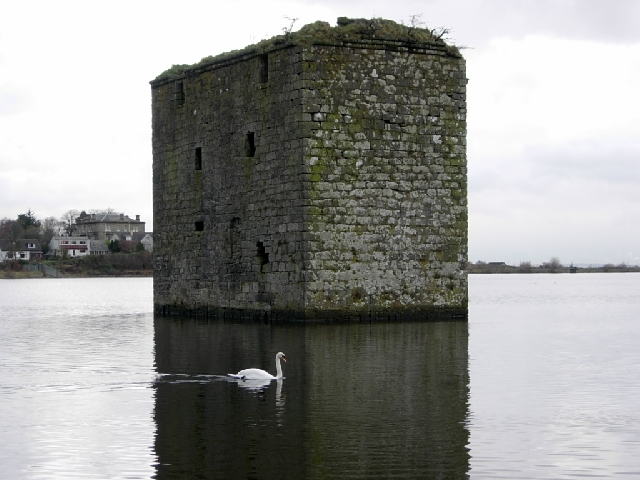
Stanely Castle

Stanely Castle is located in the waters of Stanely Reservoir, to the south of Paisley, Scotland, at the foot of the Gleniffer Braes. It was probably built in the early 15th century, on an island within a marsh. The castle is now a ruin. Since 1837 it has been partially submerged by the reservoir, and is completely inaccessible. When the water is drained it can be seen that the castle stands on a narrow promontory, which is connected to the reservoir bank in the southwest.

== History ==
Stanely was the ancient seat of the Danzielstons. In the early 15th century the estate passed to the Maxwells of Calderwood, who sold it in 1629 to Lady Ross of Hawhead. In the 18th century, it passed to the Boyle Earls of Glasgow. The castle was then used as a school, but was abandoned by the early 19th century. It was sold by the 4th Earl of Glasgow to the Paisley Water Company, who built the present reservoir.

== Construction ==
The castle is constructed in local freestone, which shows very little sign of weathering. It has been constructed of large, roughly squared and hammer dressed blocks, which have been laid in rough courses. Corbels and window margins are dressed. A high proportion of masonry is cut and dressed stone, especially in the interior. The windows are small, and there are keyhole-shaped arrow slits.

== Description ==
The castle is an L-shaped tower house of four storeys, which originally would have included a garret, but it is clear that the castle was constructed in two phases. The original castle being a rectangular tower aligned NNE-SSW. To this block was added a square extension or jamb. When the jamb was added it was necessary to add new openings into the new rooms. The castle was entered by its only door which is on the east side.

The first floor, and all upper floors, were reached by a spiral staircase in the northeast corner. The ground floor was occupied by two compartments or cellars. There was a private staircase in the south gable which gave private access to the hall above. The first floor was occupied by the kitchen in the jamb, and the great hall and a private cabinet in the main block. The second and third floors each contained two bedrooms in the main block and an additional room in the jamb. Each of these rooms contained a privy and fireplaces.

Stanely has two storeys over the hall, with no indication of rooms in the roof space. However it is possible that one attic room or a pair of small rooms could have been created. The Hearth Tax return for 1691 lists eleven hearths. Since the floors up to the parapet level only account for nine hearths, this strengthens the case for attic rooms in the main block.
