= Patrick Boyle, 8th Earl of Glasgow =

Scottish nobleman (1874–1963)

Captain The Right Honourable The Earl of Glasgow DSO
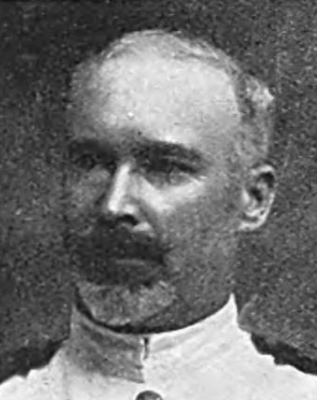

Member of the House of Lords (Note: As Baron Fairlie.)
- Lord Temporal
- In office 13 December 1915 – 14 December 1963
- Preceded by: The 7th Earl of Glasgow
- Succeeded by: The 9th Earl of Glasgow

Personal details
- Born: Patrick James Boyle; 18 June 1874
- Died: 14 December 1963 (aged 89)
- Spouse: Hyacynthe Mary Bell (m. 1906)
- Children: 5, including David
- Parent(s): David Boyle, 7th Earl of Glasgow; Dorothea Elizabeth Thomasina Hunter-Blair

Patrick James Boyle, 8th Earl of Glasgow (18 June 1874 – 14 December 1963), was a Scottish nobleman and a far right political activist, involved with fascist parties and groups.

== Royal Navy ==
Boyle was trained for a naval career at the cadet ship HMS Britannia and graduated as a Royal Navy Lieutenant on 22 June 1897. He was Flag Lieutenant to Rear Admiral Edmund Jeffreys, Senior Naval Officer, Coast of Ireland Station, serving on his flagship HMS Howe which was port guard ship at Queenstown. They transferred to HMS Empress of India in October 1901, when that vessel relieved the Howe. He was promoted to Commander on 31 December 1908, and eventually obtained the rank of Captain before retiring in 1919. He saw action during the First World War, commanding HMS Pyramus, and was awarded the Distinguished Service Order in 1915. Following his retirement from active duty he was admitted to the ceremonial role of Lieutenant of the Royal Company of Archers.

== Right-wing politics ==
Boyle was noted for his extremist views and took an active role in a number of rightist groups in the inter-war period. An anti-communist by inclination, his views were informed by a landing he made as a Naval Commander in Vladivostok in 1917 where he claimed to witness examples of Bolshevik terror that helped to solidify his rightist opinions. He was one of a number of large landowners who joined the British Fascists in the early 1920s, largely inspired by slump in agriculture and the simultaneous rise in taxation that they blamed on democracy and the rise of the left. Boyle served as leader of the British Fascists units in Scotland. Close to Brigadier R. B. D. Blakeney, Boyle joined Blakeney's splinter group the Loyalists in 1926 in order to support the work of the Organisation for the Maintenance of Supplies. This group had agreed to disavow fascism in order to co-operate with the government. Boyle disappeared from the political scene soon afterwards when, virtually bankrupted by the burden of his large estates, he emigrated to France, remaining there until 1930.

Following his return to the United Kingdom, Boyle once again became involved in rightist politics and was a regular invitee to the January Club, a high society discussion club organised by the British Union of Fascists. According to contemporary Labour Party documents Boyle subsequently provided funding to Oswald Mosley's party, which was one of the intentions of the January Club. Boyle also joined the Anglo-German Fellowship.

== Peerage ==
Boyle succeeded to the title of 8th Earl of Glasgow on 13 December 1915, also succeeding to the subsidiary titles of 8th Viscount Kelburn, 2nd Baron Fairlie of Fairlie, Ayrshire, and 8th Lord Boyle, of Kelburn, Stewartoun, Finnick, Largs and Dalry. He also served as Vice-Lord-Lieutenant of Ayrshire from 1942 to 1963.

Writer Evelyn Waugh recounts that in May 1942, Colonel John Durnford-Slater of No. 3 Commando was keen to get on good terms with Boyle, and offered to help him by blowing up a tree stump on his estate. The charge was miscalculated by a factor of ten, and the resulting explosion not only removed the stump but also flattened a nearby plantation of young trees and broke every window in his castle. Boyle retreated to the lavatory to regain his composure; but when he pulled the chain. the ceiling, weakened by the explosion, fell on his head.

== Personal life ==
Boyle married Hyacynthe Mary Bell, daughter of Dr William Abraham Bell of Pendell Court, Bletchingley, Surrey, on 29 May 1906 and had five children:

- Rear-Admiral David William Maurice Boyle, 9th Earl of Glasgow (24 July 1910 – 8 June 1984)
- Lady Grizel Mary Boyle (28 April 1913 – 26 September 1942) -- died after two weeks in a lifeboat in the open Atlantic after the sinking of the RMS Laconia
- Lady Hersey Margaret Boyle (11 July 1914 – 7 February 1993)
- Captain Hon. Patrick James Boyle (23 May 1917 – 4 May 1946)
- Lady Margaret Dorothea Boyle (20 November 1920 – 17 October 2021).

Thomas Inskip, 1st Viscount Caldecote, was his brother-in-law, being married to Boyle's sister.

== Notes ==
Peerage of Scotland
Preceded by David Boyle	Earl of Glasgow; 1915–1963	Succeeded by David Boyle
Peerage of the United Kingdom
Preceded by David Boyle	Baron Fairlie; 1915–1963; Member of the House of Lords (1915–1963)	Succeeded by David Boyle
