= Organisation for the Maintenance of Supplies =

British right-wing volunteer movement

The Organisation for the Maintenance of Supplies was a British right-wing movement, established in 1925 to provide volunteers in the event of a general strike. During the General Strike of 1926, it was taken over by the government to provide vital services, such as transport and communications.

== Prelude ==
On "Red Friday", 31 July 1925, the government avoided a confrontation with the Miners Federation of Great Britain, which was expected to be followed by secondary industrial action by the railwaymen of the National Union of Railwaymen, and wider confrontation. However, as Stanley Baldwin said later, "we were not ready". The government had an emergency plan but inadequate means of implementing it. It thus established a Royal Commission and provided a subsidy to enable the mineowners to maintain the miners' existing wages and hours of work.

In early August, Home Secretary William Joynson-Hicks reported to the cabinet on the state of preparations, and his recommendations were approved, but the establishment of a volunteer service was deferred.

== Formation ==
The OMS had its public origins in the letters page of The Times, where many were calling for the formation of a volunteer organisation to take over the jobs of striking workers, in the event of a general strike, which was widely feared by the conservative establishment at the time, as part of a communist plot. The same page was used on 25 September 1925 by the Home Secretary to announce the formation of just such a group, the new OMS. Nevertheless, he admitted, on 1 October, that he had known of its inauguration for many weeks and that its promoters had consulted him. The government had no objection to it.

The organisation, to be run by a committee chaired by Lord Hardinge, was to have branches in every city and to recruit volunteers in five classes, four of which were based on the men's fitness and age. The fifth was for women, who were to be set to work only where they could avoid any "rough handling". Lord Jellicoe and other top military men sat on the committee, to give the OMS a military discipline and to instil public confidence in the group that such important figures were involved.

The organisation was, however, explicitly non-political. British Fascists were barred from joining unless they changed their name, abandoned their military structure and changed their manifesto. That led to a split in the British Fascists, with several leaders leaving to become the loyalists, an organisation that would be absorbed into OMS. Still, it showed apparent independence by employing nobody in government service.

== Reaction ==
Whilst the scheme was enthusiastically supported by the right-wing Daily Mail it was denounced as a form of fascism not only by the Communist Party of Great Britain but also by the anti-communist Daily Express, which compared the OMS to the Ku Klux Klan and the Blackshirts. An early speech by one of the group's leaders was deemed unfit for broadcast by the BBC, which feared that it would compromise their impartiality.

Brigadier-General William Horwood, the Commissioner of the Metropolitan Police also refused to work with what he believed to be a fascist organisation, and by the end of 1925 the government had informed General Sir Robert McCalmont that in the event of any general strike, the OMS would be disbanded and its membership taken over entirely by the government.

Still, the OMS had the confidence of some provincial police forces and branches of the Conservative Party despite its inauspicious start.

== Development ==
The development of OMS was not regarded as wholly favourable by some government officials, who were concerned at rumours that OMS agents were expecting to supplant official organisations in the event of an emergency. The junior ministers William Mitchell-Thomson and J.C.C. Davidson met the leaders of OMS, who agreed not to establish branches where there were local objections, but to encourage unofficial contacts between the local officials. OMS would concentrate on recruiting lorry drivers rather than those more likely to be employed by local authorities.

OMS was short of funds by March 1926, having failed to gain the commercial backing that it hoped. It also lacked the means to train volunteers.

== General Strike ==
Following the outbreak of the strike and the introduction by the government of emergency powers, it turned over its membership lists to the new government civil commissioners and so became a state organisation. Although the OMS name continued to be used, any notion of independence was abandoned, and it became an arm of government. The group had some 100,000 members registered at the commencement of the strike, but the middle-class background of many of its volunteers meant that they often proved wholly unsuited to the manual work, such as the running railways and ports.

It produced slightly over 5,000 volunteers. Car drivers, lorry drivers and power station workers were the largest groups.

It managed to produce the British Gazette, a pro-government newspaper, during the strike.

== Fascism ==
The British Fascisti (BF), which maintained transport and communications units to be used in the event of a strike, provided an organisational structure for the OMS, but there was uncertainty at government level about allowing BF members to join the OMS given fears about their potentially revolutionary nature. Members of the BF were allowed to join only if it agreed to renounce fascism and the BF name, which was rejected by the majority of the group's controlling committee, under Rotha Lintorn-Orman. The minority faction, led by Brigadier-General R.B.D. Blakeney and Rear-Admiral A.E. Armstrong, split to form a new group known as the Loyalists (as well as the Scottish Loyalists under the Earl of Glasgow), which was subsumed into the OMS as soon as the strike began.

Still, individual fascists obtained high rank within the OMS. BF member and later co-founder of the National Fascisti Colonel Ralph Bingham worked along with Peter Howard, who had published a magazine for fascists in Ukraine and would later be a member of the New Party. They ran an OMS depot during the strike. The BF's Neil Francis Hawkins, later a leading figure within both the British Union of Fascists and the Union Movement, was also important in the OMS during the strike.

== Later organisations ==
The OMS can in some ways be compared to 1970s movements such as Civil Assistance, which played on widespread public fear of trade union militancy.

== Sources ==
- Arnot, R. Page (1967) [1926]. The General Strike, May 1926: its origin and history. Labour Research Department.
- Benewick, Robert (1969). A study of British fascism: Political Violence and Public Order. Allan Lane.
- Dorril, Stephen (2007). Blackshirt: Sir Oswald Mosley & British Fascism. Penguin Books.
- Mason, A. (April 1969). "The Government and the General Strike, 1926". International Review of Social History. 14 (1): 1–22. doi:10.1017/S0020859000003497.
- Perkins, Anne (2006). A Very British Strike: 3–12 May 1926. Macmillan.
- Phillips, G.A. (1976). The General Strike: the politics of industrial conflict. Weidenfeld and Nicolson.
- Renshaw, Patrick (1975). The General Strike. Taylor & Francis.
