= James Carr-Boyle, 5th Earl of Glasgow =

British naval commander and politician

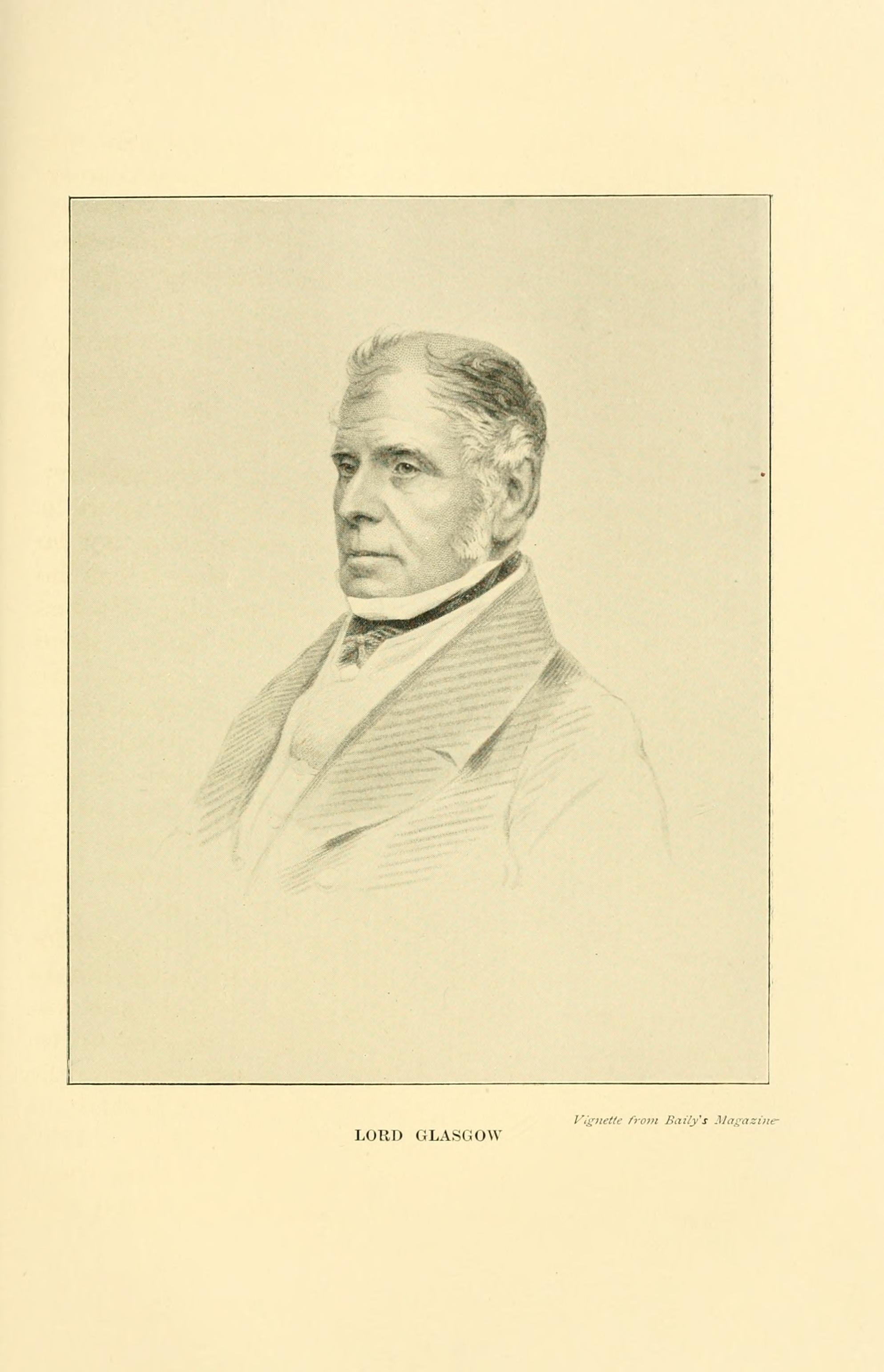
from Ashgill (1900)

Captain James Carr-Boyle, 5th Earl of Glasgow (10 April 1792 – 11 March 1869), styled Viscount Kelburn from 1818 until 1843, was a British naval commander and politician.

== Background ==
Glasgow was the son of George Boyle, 4th Earl of Glasgow, and Lady Augusta, daughter of James Hay, 15th Earl of Erroll. In 1822 he assumed by Royal licence the additional surname of Carr.

== Military and political career ==
Glasgow was a captain in the Royal Navy and also sat as Member of Parliament for Ayrshire from 1839 to 1843. Between 1844 and 1869 he served as Lord Lieutenant of Renfrewshire.

== Horse racing ==
Many wealthy aristocrats have been devoted to racing, but few have ever had so little success as Lord Glasgow, whose lifelong love affair with the turf left him with little to show by way of either prize money or prized studs. Part of the problem was Glasgow's boneheaded reluctance to give any of his horses names until they had proved themselves by winning races, a habit that naturally caused great confusion in the stables. On the evening before one event, according to anecdote, "he was induced to Christen three, and the following were the names under which they ran: 'Give-Him-a-Name', 'He-Hasn't-Got-a-Name', 'He-Isn't-Worth-a-Name'."

Glasgow also proved obstinately devoted to several bloodlines "of proved uselessness", and his notoriously vile temper hindered plans for the long-term development of the few promising animals he did possess. It was not unknown for him to order that horses that had failed to live up to expectations on the daily gallops be shot on the spot. His record, one despairing trainer noted, was six summary executions in a single morning. A keen huntsman, the eccentric Earl proved equally dangerous over timber. When unable to flush out any foxes, he was quite likely to arbitrarily designate one of his own huntsmen as the quarry and relentlessly pursue the unfortunate man across the countryside for miles.

== Family ==
Lord Glasgow married Georgina Ann, daughter of Edward Hay-Mackenzie, in 1821. He died in March 1869, aged 76, and was succeeded in the earldom by his half-brother, George. Lady Glasgow died in March 1895. As of 1861, the couple resided at Hawkhead House, Paisley.

== See also ==
- O'Byrne, William Richard (1849). "Carr-Boyle, James" . A Naval Biographical Dictionary . John Murray – via Wikisource.

Parliament of the United Kingdom
Preceded by John Dunlop	Member of Parliament for Ayrshire; 1839–1843	Succeeded by Alexander Haldane Oswald
Honorary titles
Preceded by Alexander Speirs	Lord Lieutenant of Renfrewshire; 1844–1869	Succeeded by Sir Michael Shaw-Stewart, Bt
Peerage of Scotland
Preceded by George Boyle	Earl of Glasgow; 1843–1869	Succeeded by George Boyle
Peerage of the United Kingdom
Preceded by George Boyle	Baron Ross; 1843–1869	Succeeded by George Boyle
