= George Boyle (priest) =

Scottish clergyman (1828-1901)

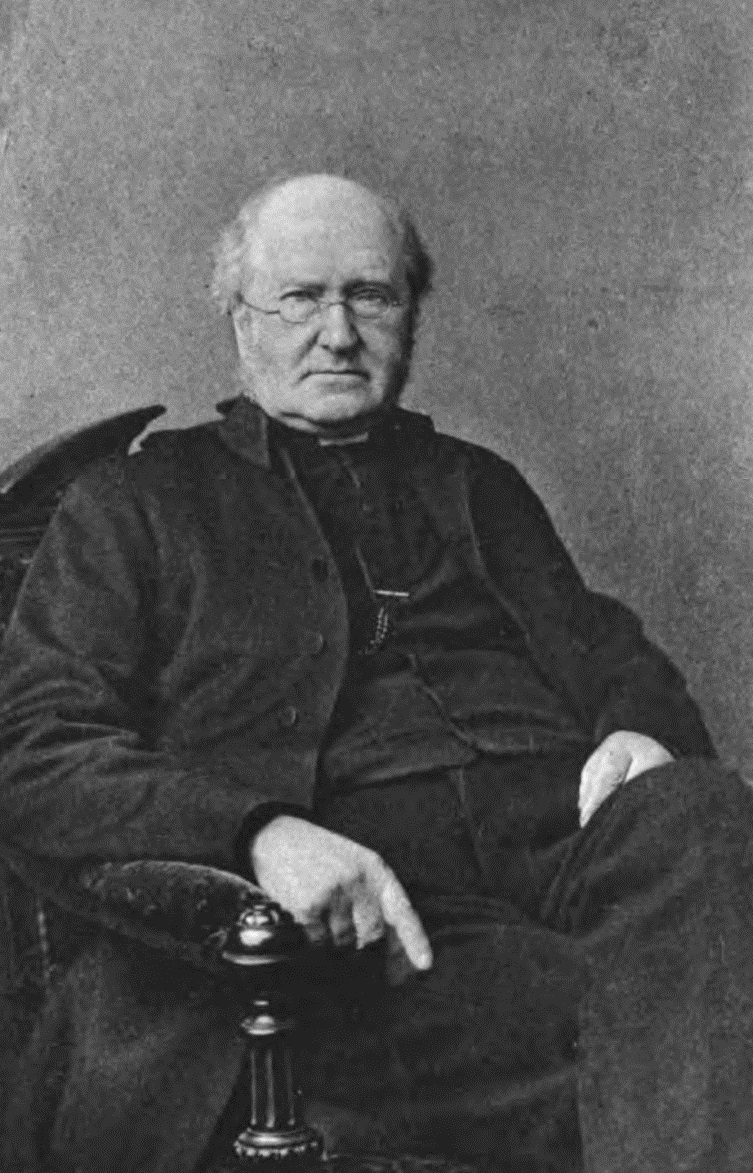
Portrait of George Boyle

George David Boyle (17 May 1828 – 21 March 1901) was Dean of Salisbury from 1880 until his death.

== Biography ==
George David Boyle was the eldest son of David Boyle, Lord Justice-General and President of the Court of Session in Scotland, by his second marriage with Camilla Catherine, eldest daughter of David Smythe, Lord Methven, and was born in 1828. He was educated at the Charterhouse and at Exeter College, Oxford (B.A. 1851; M.A. 1853). Between 1853 and 1860, he held in succession the curacies of Kidderminster and Hagley. He was incumbent of St. Michael's Handsworth, from 1861 to 1867, and rural dean of Handsworth in 1866–67. He was appointed vicar of Kidderminster in 1867, and rural dean in the following year. He was honorary canon of Worcester from 1872 till 1880, when he was appointed Dean of Salisbury.

He was president of the Oxford Union in 1849.

He was the author of Confession, according to the Rule of the Church of England and Lessons from a Churchyard.

In 1861 he married Mary Christina, eldest daughter of William Robins, of Hagley, Worcestershire. There were no children.
