= Alexander Boyle =

British naval officer (1810–1884)

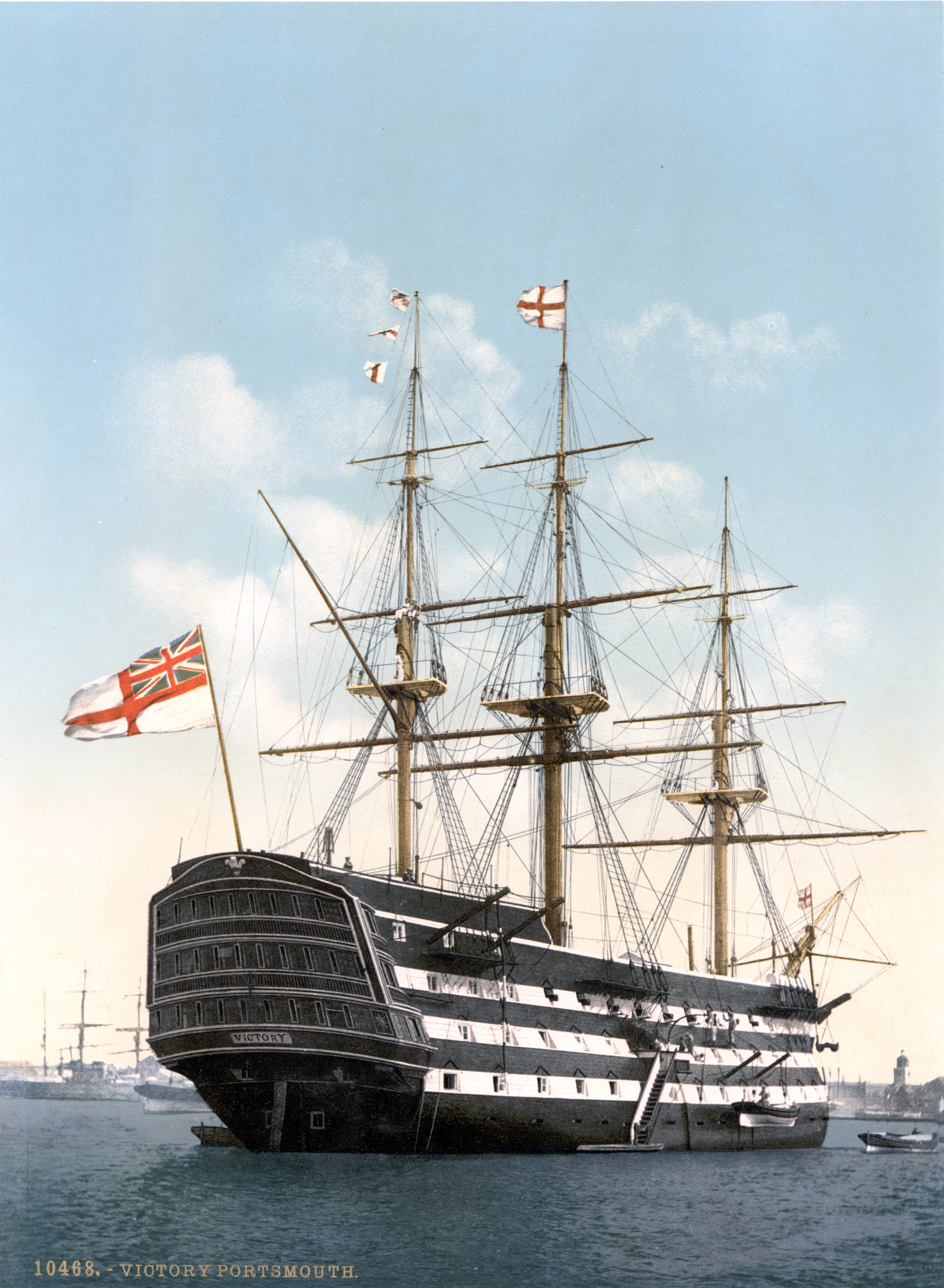
HMS Victory

Alexander Boyle (1810–1884) was a Royal Navy officer whose most famous command was HMS Victory, Nelson's flagship.

== Life ==
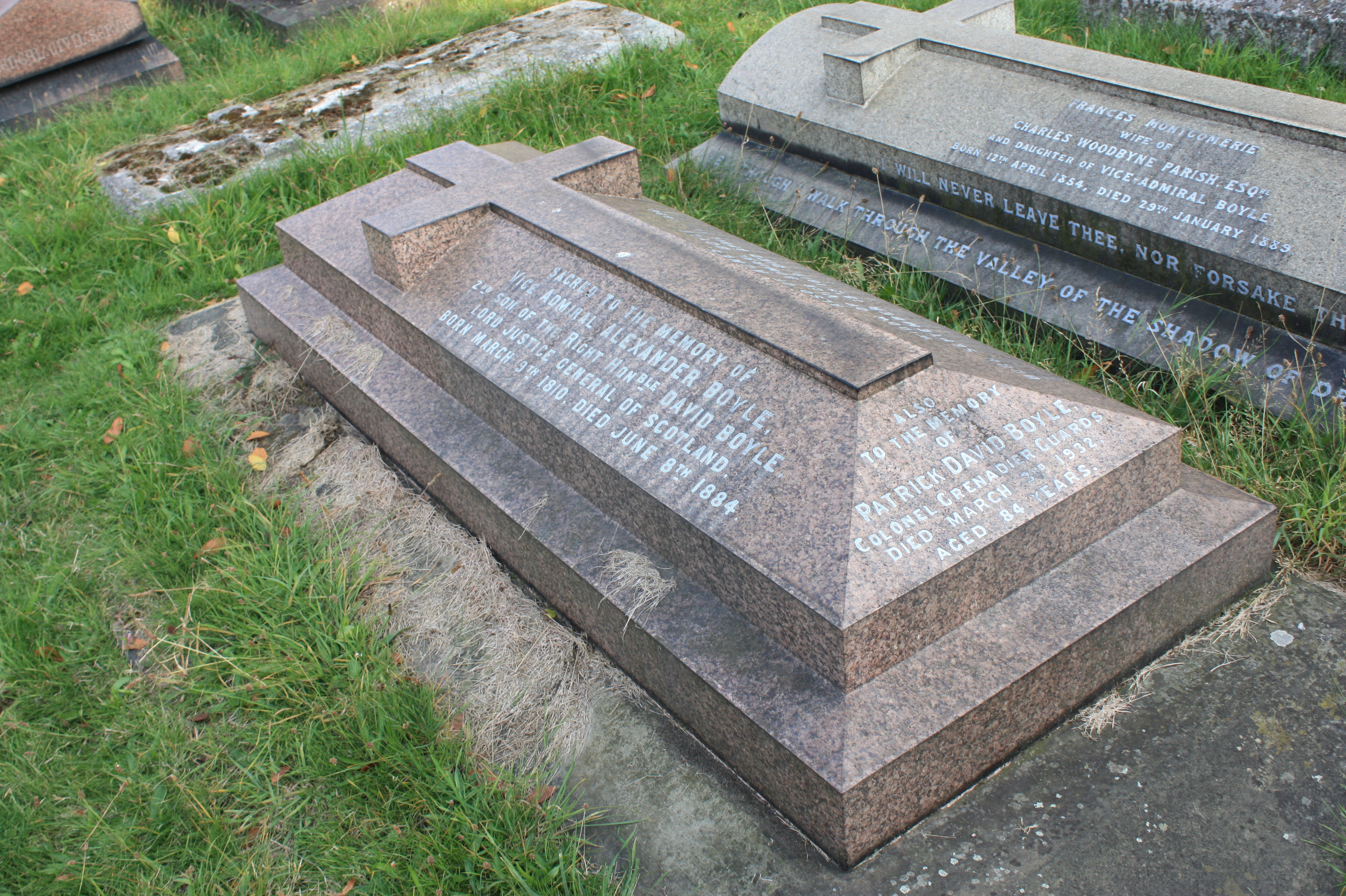
The grave of Alexander Boyle, Brompton Cemetery

He was born in Edinburgh at 41 George Street on 9 March 1810 the son of David Boyle, at that point both Solicitor General and MP for Ayrshire. His father was later made "Lord Boyle", Lord President of the Court of Session. He was also known as Lord Shewalton due to his Ayrshire estates. His mother was Elizabeth Montgomery.

He joined the Royal Navy on 4 September 1823 aged 13. He became a Lieutenant in October 1830 aged 20.

His first noted service (June 1832) was on HMS Champion an 18 gun sloop under Arthur Duncombe serving in the Mediterranean. In September 1836 he moved to the 36 gun frigate HMS Pique as commander. In September 1841 he moved to the 28-gun HMS North Star under James Everard Home based in Portsmouth. Boyle left the North Star after only a month, before its action during the Flagstaff War of 1845 in New Zealand. However, he joined the huge 110-gun HMS Queen which had been renamed in 1839 to acknowledge Queen Victoria. This served as the flagship of Admiral Edward Owen. In February 1842 Boyle was promoted to Commander and was made commander of HMS Queen.

In December 1845 he was made Captain and Commander of HMS Thunderbolt, a 6-gun paddle sloop based at the Cape of Good Hope. The ship was wrecked on rocks off Cape Receife on 3 February 1847. Boyle was officially reprimanded for this but was not dismissed.

After a break of some years, he was given charge of HMS Victory in April 1852, under first Admiral Thomas Briggs then Admiral Thomas John Cochrane. This had a relatively quiet life, based in Portsmouth. After two years on Victory he was made Second in Command of the 50 gun HMS Indefatigable in May 1854, patrolling the south-east coast of the United States as the flagship of Admiral Johnstone. In August 1855 he was given command of the 8 gun HMS Star which operated as a coastguard vessel and in August 1857 was made full Captain still on the American coast.

He retired in April 1875 with the rank of Rear Admiral and was promoted to Vice Admiral in August 1879.

He died on 8 June 1884 and is buried in Brompton Cemetery.

== Family ==
In 1844 he married Agnes Walker daughter of James Walker of Westminster. They had five daughters and three sons:

- Frances Montgomerie Boyle (d. 1889) married Charles Woodbine Parish son of Woodbine Parish.
- Patrick David Boyle (1848-1932) served in the Grenadier Guards and is buried with his parents
- James Boyle MVO (1850-1931) was a Captain in the Royal Irish Fusiliers and later served as British Consul to Funchal from 1907 to 1919
- Alexander Boyle (1857-1923) married Fanny Studholme and were parents to Alexander David Boyle RN

His elder brothers included David Boyle, 7th Earl of Glasgow.
