= Conrad Russell, 5th Earl Russell =

British historian and politician

The Right Honourable The Earl Russell FBA
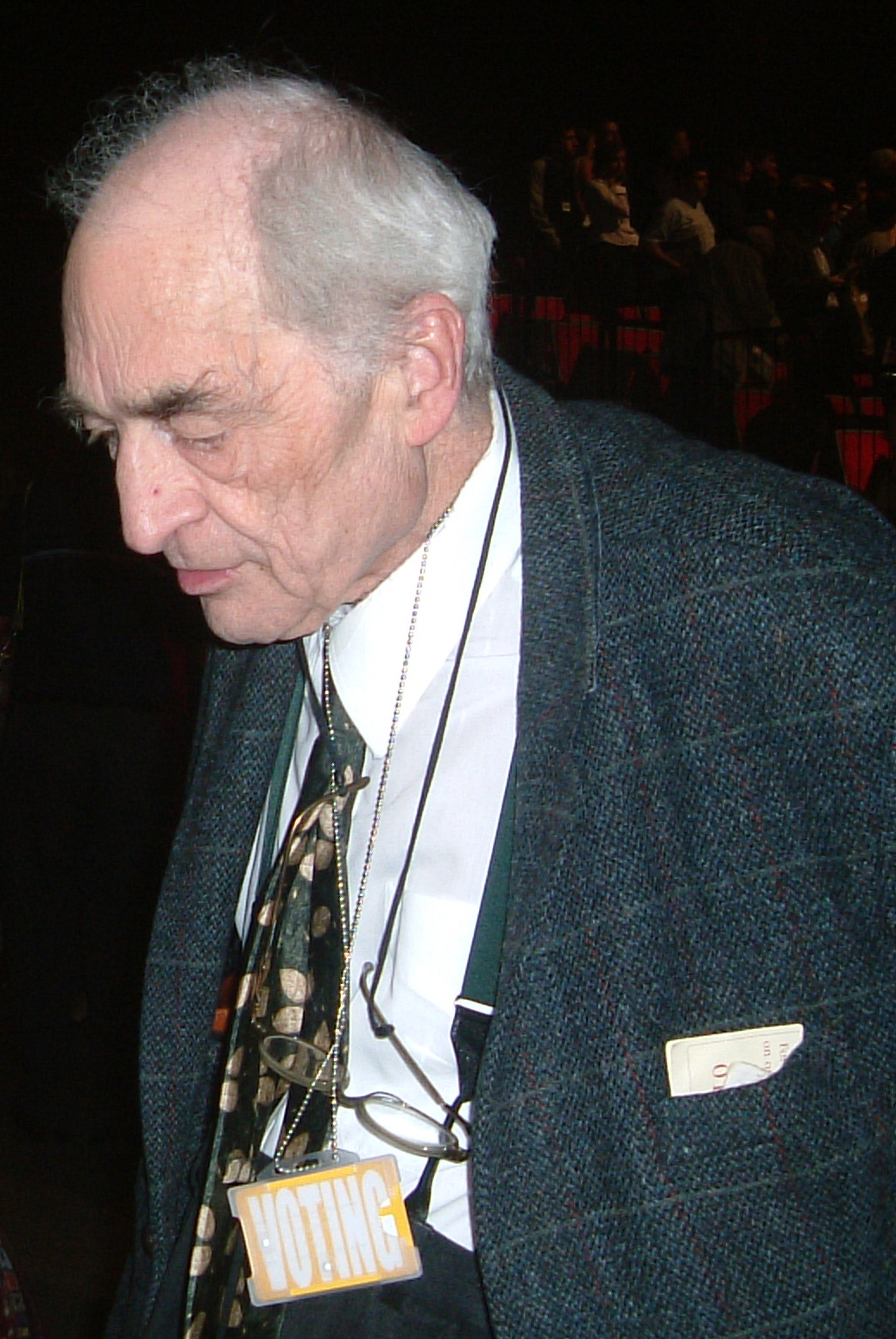
- Lord Russell at the Liberal Democrat Federal Conference in Brighton, September 2003

Member of the House of Lords
- Lord Temporal
- Hereditary peerage 21 March 1988 – 11 November 1999
- Preceded by: The 4th Earl Russell
- Succeeded by: Seat abolished
- Elected Hereditary Peer; 11 November 1999 – 14 October 2004
- Election: 1999
- Preceded by: Seat established
- Succeeded by: The 10th Earl of Glasgow

Personal details
- Born: Conrad Sebastian Robert Russell, 15 April 1937 Harting, West Sussex, England
- Died: 14 October 2004 (aged 67) Park Royal, London, England
- Party: Liberal Democrats (1988–2004)
- Other political affiliations: Labour; Liberal
- Spouse: Elizabeth Sanders (m. 1962; died 2003)
- Children: Nicholas; John
- Parent(s): Bertrand Russell; Patricia Spence
- Education: Oxford University
- Occupation: Politician, historian
- Profession: Academic

Conrad Sebastian Robert Russell, 5th Earl Russell (15 April 1937 – 14 October 2004), was a British historian and politician.

As an academic historian, he worked primarily on 17th-century English history, having extensively written and lectured on the parliamentary struggles of the English Civil Wars. In 1987 he succeeded his half-brother, John Russell, as Earl Russell, gaining a seat in the House of Lords.

== Early life ==
From a long family line of distinguished Whigs and Liberals, Russell was the son of the philosopher and mathematician Bertrand Russell and his third wife Patricia Russell. He was also a great-grandson of the 19th-century Whig Prime Minister Lord John Russell. He was named after his father's great friend Joseph Conrad. He was educated at Eton College, where he was a King's Scholar, and Merton College, Oxford.

In 1960, he began his career as a lecturer in history at Bedford College, London.

== Academic career ==
Russell became a historian working on the origins of the English Civil War and critical of older Whig and Marxist interpretations. His major works include Crisis of Parliaments: English history 1509–1660 (1971), Origins of the English Civil War (edited, 1973), Parliaments and English politics, 1621–1629 (1979), Unrevolutionary England, 1603–1642 (1990), and Fall of the British monarchies, 1637–1642 (1991). His work on early Stuart Parliaments was profoundly influenced by the work of Alan Everitt, who had argued that the English gentry were preoccupied with defending their positions in the localities rather than responding to the demands of the Crown. This no longer seems entirely plausible in the light of the work done by Richard Cust, Clive Holmes, Peter Lake and Christopher Thompson. Russell argued that the Civil War was much less a result of long term constitutional conflicts than had previously been thought, e.g. by Lawrence Stone and Christopher Hill, and that its origins are to be sought rather in the years immediately preceding the outbreak of war in 1642 and in the context of the problems of the multiple kingdoms of the British Isles, a hypothesis for which he was indebted to the pioneering study of Helmut Koenigsberger. This area is still being explored by historians like John Adamson and David Scott even if their detailed conclusions vary from those reached by Russell.

He was lecturer (and later reader) in history at Bedford College, University of London (now part of Royal Holloway), 1960–1979; professor of history at Yale University, US, 1979–1984; Astor Professor of British History at University College London, 1984–1990; and professor of British history at King's College London from 1990 to his retirement in 2003.

== Political career ==
As a young man, Russell's political allegiance varied between the Labour Party and the then weak Liberal Party. He stood as the Labour candidate in Paddington South in the 1966 general election, but failed to win the seat from the Conservatives.

He succeeded to the title of Earl Russell on the death of his half-brother, John Russell, in 1987. He was the first parliamentarian to take his seat as a Liberal Democrat, shortly after the party was formed in 1988 from a merger of the Liberal Party and the Social Democratic Party.

In 1999, all but 92 hereditary peers were removed from the House of Lords. Lord Russell was elected at the top of his party's list of hereditary peers to retain their seats, though he had consistently argued in favour of abolishing the Lords completely, and replacing it with an elected senate. He was admired in the House for his fund of historical anecdotes and dry sense of humour.

He was vice-president of the Liberal Democrat Youth and Students 1993–1994 and honorary president of the Liberal Democrat History Group 1998–2004. In 1988 he became Co-Chairman (later President) of the Council for Academic Autonomy, a group of university academics promoting the principles of academic freedom and the independence of universities from state and commercial control, and was instrumental in a crucial amendment to the Education Reform Act of 1988.

== Death ==
Russell's health worsened in the late 1990s and in 2004 he died of respiratory failure and the complications of emphysema, at Central Middlesex Hospital, a year after the death of his wife in 2003.

He was succeeded as Earl Russell by his elder son, Nicholas, who died in 2014 and was succeeded by his brother, John, who is also a politician.

== Published books ==
- The Crisis of Parliaments: English History 1509–1660 (1971)
- The Origins of the English Civil War (1973)
- Parliaments and English Politics, 1621–1629 (1979)
- Unrevolutionary England:1603-1642 (1990)
- The Causes of the English Civil War (1990)
- The Fall of the British Monarchies, 1637–1642 (1991)
- Academic Freedom (1993)
- An Intelligent Person's Guide to Liberalism (1999)

In his book Academic Freedom, Russell examines the ideal and the limits of academic freedom, and the relations between the university and the state. He notes (p. 24) that his father's career is a reminder that a free society is not a guarantee against losing an academic job for holding very unpopular opinions on non-academic subjects, as Bertrand Russell in fact did twice.

== Arms ==
Coat of arms of Conrad Russell, 5th Earl Russell
Crest A goat statant argent, armed and unguled or. Escutcheon Argent, a lion rampant gules, on a chief sable, three escallops of the field, over the centre escallop a mullet. Supporters Dexter, a lion gules; sinister, an heraldic antelope gules, armed, unguled, tufted, ducally gorged and chained, the chain reflexed over the back or; each supporter charged on the shoulder with a mullet argent. Motto Che sara sara (What must be must be).

== Sources ==
- Morrill, John (2008). "Russell, Conrad Sebastian Robert, fifth Earl Russell (1937–2004)". Oxford Dictionary of National Biography (online ed.). Oxford University Press. doi:10.1093/ref:odnb/94399. (Subscription, Wikipedia Library access or UK public library membership required.)

Peerage of the United Kingdom
Preceded by John Russell	Earl Russell; 1987–2004; Member of the House of Lords (1988–1999)	Succeeded by Nicholas Russell
Parliament of the United Kingdom
New office created by the House of Lords Act 1999	Elected hereditary peer to the House of Lords under the House of Lords Act 1999; 1999–2004	Succeeded by The Earl of Glasgow
