= Patrick Boyle, 10th Earl of Glasgow =

British politician (born 1939)

The Right Honourable The Earl of Glasgow DL
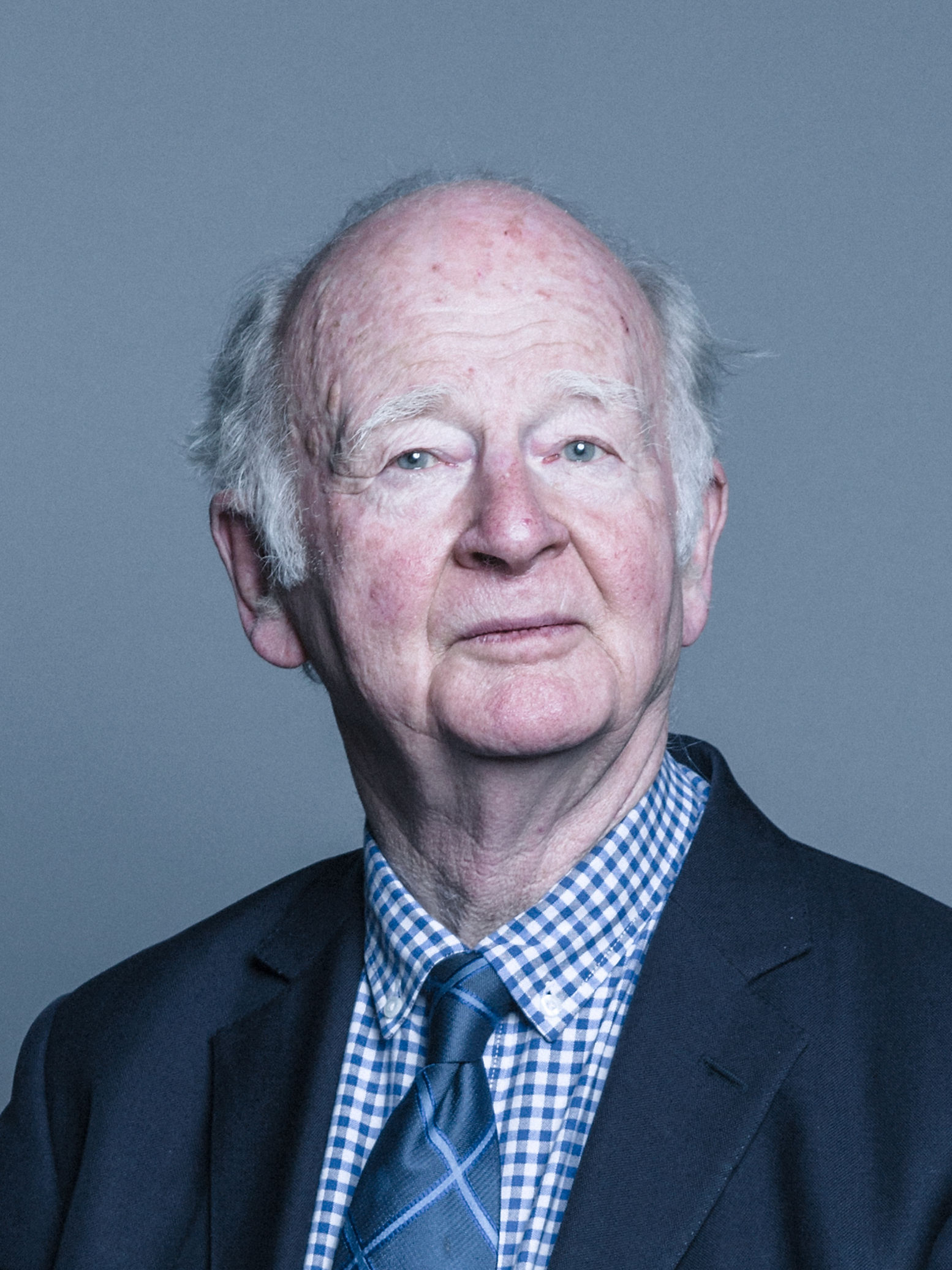
- Official portrait, 2018

Member of the House of Lords
- Lord Temporal
- Hereditary peerage 28 February 1990 – 11 November 1999
- Preceded by: The 9th Earl of Glasgow
- Succeeded by: Seat abolished
- Elected Hereditary Peer; 17 January 2005 – 29 April 2026
- By-election: 2005
- Preceded by: The 5th Earl Russell
- Succeeded by: Seat abolished

Personal details
- Born: Patrick Robin Archibald Boyle; 30 July 1939 (age 86) Marylebone, London, England
- Party: Liberal Democrat
- Spouse: Isabel James (m. 1974; died 2019)
- Children: David Boyle, Viscount Kelburn; Lady Alice Boyle
- Parent(s): David Boyle, 9th Earl of Glasgow; Dorothea Lyle
- Education: Eton College; University of Paris
- Occupation: Politician, peer
- Other titles: 4th Baron Fairlie

Patrick Robin Archibald Boyle, 10th Earl of Glasgow (born 30 July 1939), is a Scottish peer, politician and the current chief of Clan Boyle. The family seat is Kelburn Castle in Ayrshire. He sat as a Liberal Democrat peer in the House of Lords.

== Early life ==
He was born to the 9th Earl of Glasgow and his first wife Dorothea Lyle. He was educated at Ludgrove School and then Eton College, where he was elected a member of Pop. He attended the Sorbonne in Paris for his university studies.

== Career ==
In 1960, he served in the Royal Naval Reserve, receiving the rank of sub-lieutenant. He subsequently worked as an assistant director in films and as a television documentary producer, he founded Kelburn Country Centre in 1977.

He succeeded to his father's titles in 1984, and became a deputy lieutenant of Ayrshire and Arran in 1995. He was elected in 2005 to succeed the 5th Earl Russell as one of the 92 hereditary peers to remain in the House of Lords after the House of Lords Act 1999.

== Personal life ==
He married Isabel James, daughter of George Douglas James, on 30 November 1974. She died on 12 November 2019.

They had two children:

- David Michael Douglas Boyle, Viscount Kelburn (born 15 October 1978)
- Lady Alice Dorothy Boyle (born 10 June 1981)

== Notes ==
Peerage of Scotland
Preceded by David Boyle	Earl of Glasgow; 1984–present	Incumbent; Heir apparent: David Boyle, Viscount Kelburn
Peerage of the United Kingdom
Preceded by David Boyle	Baron Fairlie; 1984–present Member of the House of Lords (1990–1999)	Incumbent; Heir apparent: David Boyle, Viscount Kelburn
Parliament of the United Kingdom
Preceded by The Earl Russell	Elected hereditary peer to the House of Lords under the House of Lords Act 1999; 2005–2026	Position abolished under the House of Lords (Hereditary Peers) Act 2026
