= Methven Castle =

Castle in Perth and Kinross, Scotland

Coordinates: 56.4168°N 3.5549°W

Designations

Inventory of Gardens and Designed Landscapes in Scotland
- Official name: Methven Castle
- Designated: 30 June 1987
- Reference no.: GDL00285

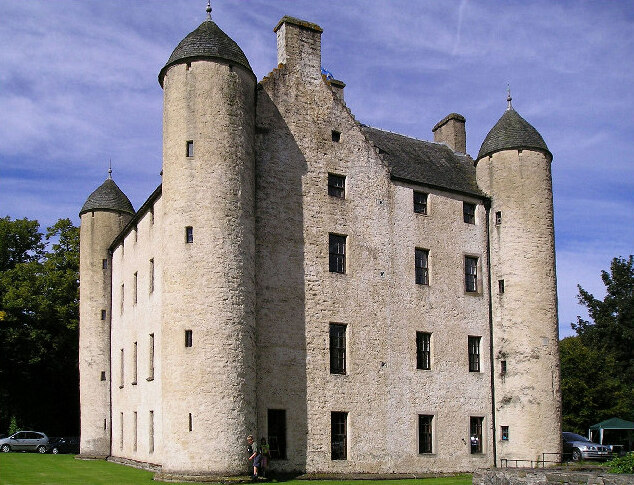
Methven Castle

Methven Castle is a privately owned 17th-century house situated east of Methven, in Perth and Kinross, Scotland.

== History ==
The lands of Methven were owned by the Mowbray family from the 12th century. The Mowbrays supported the claim of John Balliol against Robert the Bruce, and on the latter's victory Methven was confiscated by the crown, and given to Walter Stewart, the Bruce's son-in-law. His descendant, Walter Stewart, Earl of Atholl, was deprived of the lands following his involvement in a plot to kill King James I. The castle sustained a siege in 1444, and was visited by King James II in 1450. King James IV visited several times in the 1490s.

Methven Castle was given to Margaret Tudor (1489–1541), queen of James IV, King of Scots, and daughter of Henry VII of England, on 29 May 1503 as part of her marriage gift. She lived at Methven after her third marriage to Henry Stewart, 1st Lord Methven, in 1528 and died there on 18 October 1541. After the third Lord Methven died without heir in 1584, King James VI gave Methven to his favourite, the Duke of Lennox. In 1664 the estate was purchased by Patrick Smythe of Braco.

The present building is dated 1664, and was designed and built by the mason-architect John Mylne. It may incorporate older work including the central spine wall. An early drawing for Methven by Patrick Smythe shows a plan with similarities to Pitreavie Castle near Dunfermline. The architect James Smith may have been involved in the project.

The Smythe family remained in possession throughout the 18th and 19th centuries, making additions to the castle and the grounds. In 1923 the castle was sold, and changed hands several times until 1984, when owner and architect Kenneth Murdoch began extensive restoration work. The east wing was demolished, following the west wing which was pulled down in the 1950s, leaving only the 17th-century house, which was given a new roof. The castle is currently owned by David Murdoch, and is a category A listed building.

== Architecture ==
It comprises a square, four-storey main block, with narrow circular towers at each corner. These have ogee-shaped roofs, and the whole building is harled. The north front has a pair of crow-stepped gables, linked by a balustrade. An east wing was added first, then a western extension with a bay window, built around 1815, probably by James Gillespie Graham. Graham produced designs for rebuilding the whole structure, but this was never carried out. The building also had a clock tower, but this was demolished around 1965. Inside, the building was remodelled in 1800, and only a stair remains of the original interiors.

== Grounds ==
Parkland was laid out around the castle from the late 18th century. David Smythe, Lord Methven planted many of the woodlands, and a walled garden was constructed in 1796. In 1830 a pinetum, an arboretum consisting of conifers, was established, and is considered the first in Scotland. David's son William continued to expand the estate and constructed glasshouses. Although the woodlands continued to be managed into the 20th century, the gardens were neglected and numerous trees felled, including much of the pinetum, in the 1950s. The largest surviving tree is the Pepperwell Oak, with a girth of 22 feet 10 inches (6.96 m), as measured in 1985. In 1883 this tree was thought to be already 400 years old. The parks and gardens are listed in the Inventory of Gardens and Designed Landscapes in Scotland, the national listing of significant gardens.
