= George Boyle, 6th Earl of Glasgow =

Scottish nobleman

The Right Honourable The Earl of Glasgow DL
- 6th Earl of Glasgow
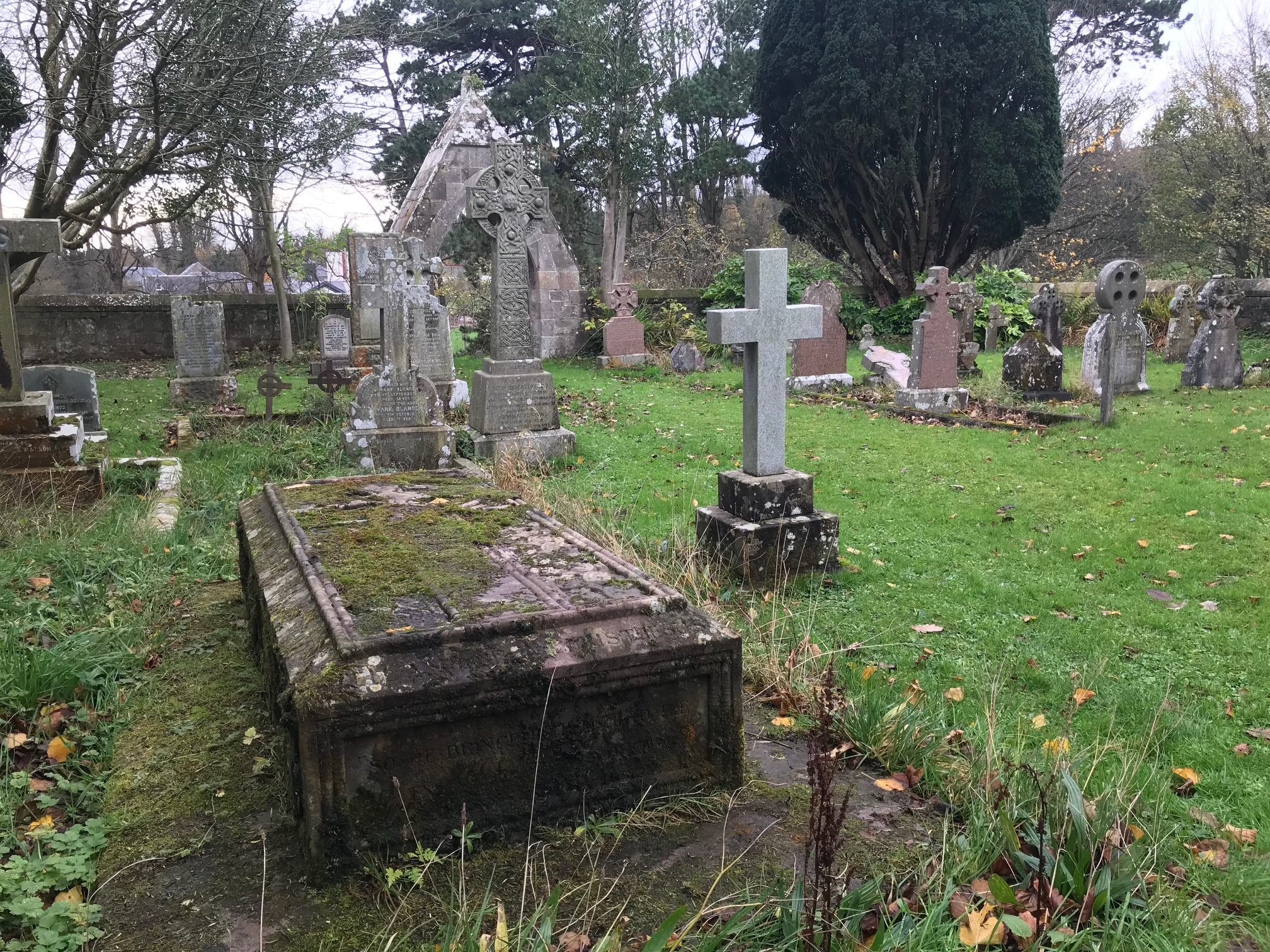
- Lord Glasgow's raised tomb within the grounds of the Cathedral of the Isles in Millport
- Predecessor: James Carr-Boyle, 5th Earl of Glasgow
- Successor: David Boyle, 7th Earl of Glasgow
- Born: George Frederick Boyle; 9 October 1825
- Died: 23 April 1890 (aged 64)
- Spouse: The Hon. Montague Abercromby (m. 1856)
- Issue: Gertrude Cochrane, Baroness Cochrane of Cults; Lady Muriel Boyle
- Parents: George Boyle, 4th Earl of Glasgow; Julia Sinclair

George Frederick Boyle, 6th Earl of Glasgow DL (9 October 1825 – 23 April 1890), was a Scottish nobleman.

He was the son of George Boyle, 4th Earl of Glasgow, and Julia Sinclair, daughter of Sir John Sinclair, 1st Baronet.

He was educated at Christ Church, Oxford, graduating BA in 1847 (MA in 1852).

In February 1847, Boyle traveled with Frederick Hamilton-Temple-Blackwood, 1st Marquess of Dufferin and Ava, to Skibbereen in County Cork to try and aid victims of the Irish Famine. Lord Dufferin left a memoir of their journey entitled Narrative of a Journey from Oxford to Skibbereen during the Year of the Irish Famine published in 1847 (27 pages).

He married Hon. Montague Abercromby (1835–1931), daughter of George Abercromby, 3rd Baron Abercromby, and Louisa Penuel Forbes, on 29 April 1856. They had two daughters

- Lady Gertrude Julia Georgina Boyle (15 November 1861 – 12 December 1950); married Thomas Cochrane, 1st Baron Cochrane of Cults, had eight children.
- Lady Muriel Louisa Diana Boyle (18 November 1872 – 3 April 1915); died unmarried

He was elected at a by-election in February 1865 as the Member of Parliament (MP) for Buteshire, but held the seat only until the general election in July 1865.

He succeeded to his half brother's titles on 11 March 1869.

He held the offices of deputy lieutenant of Fife and Renfrewshire. He held the office of Lord Clerk Register of Scotland from 1879 until his death.

He died at age 64, without male issue. On his death, the UK barony of Ross of Hawkhead became extinct.

== Religion ==
Boyle was an Episcopalian and was a long time associate of Bishop Alexander Forbes and a supporter of his views. Correspondence between the two men is held by the University of Dundee's archives. In 1848 the Boyle founded a choir school attached to the Church of St. Andrews, Millport. He followed this up in 1849 by founding and endowing the Episcopal College and Collegiate Church of the Holy Spirit, Cumbrae. The college was completed in 1851 to plans by William Butterfield and was later affiliated to the University of Durham as Cumbrae Theological College. While the Collegiate Church was elevated to the status of Cathedral of Argyll and the Isles in 1879, the college ultimately closed in 1888.

Parliament of the United Kingdom
Preceded by David Mure	Member of Parliament for Buteshire; February 1865 – July 1865	Succeeded by James Lamont
Political offices
Preceded by Sir William Gibson Craig	Lord Clerk Register; 1879–1890	Succeeded by The Duke of Montrose
Peerage of Scotland
Preceded by James Carr-Boyle	Earl of Glasgow; 1869–1890	Succeeded by David Boyle
Peerage of the United Kingdom
Preceded by James Carr-Boyle	Baron Ross; 1869–1890	Extinct
