= HMS Actaeon (U07) =

Modified Black Swan-class sloop

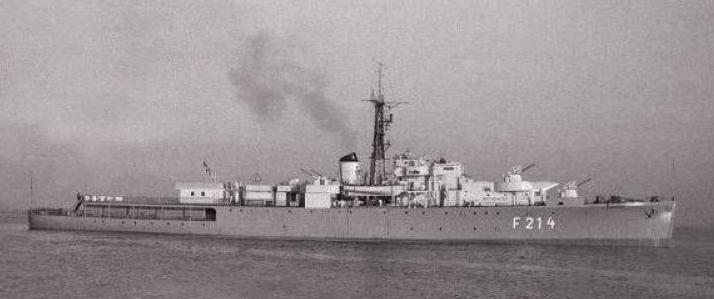
- Actaeon renamed Hipper in Bundesmarine service in 1962.

History

United Kingdom
- Name: Actaeon
- Namesake: Actaeon
- Ordered: 3 December 1941
- Builder: Thornycroft, Woolston
- Laid down: 15 May 1944
- Launched: 25 July 1945
- Commissioned: 24 July 1946
- Identification: Pennant number: U07
- Fate: Sold to Bundesmarine
- Notes: Actaeon’s badge is on display at Selborne Graving Dock, Naval Base Simon's Town.

West Germany
- Name: Hipper
- Namesake: Admiral Franz von Hipper
- Commissioned: 9 December 1958
- Identification: Pennant number: F 214
- Fate: Scrapped on 25 October 1967

General characteristics
- Class & type: Modified Black Swan-class sloop
- Displacement: 1,350 tons
- Length: 283 ft (86 m)
- Beam: 38.5 ft (11.7 m)
- Propulsion: Geared turbines; two shafts
- Speed: 20 knots (37 km/h; 23 mph) at 4,300 hp (3,200 kW)
- Complement: 192 men + 1 cat
- Armament: 6 × QF 4 in Mk XVI anti-aircraft guns; 12 × 20 mm anti-aircraft guns

HMS Actaeon was a modified Black Swan-class sloop built for the Royal Navy during the Second World War. She was completed too late for service in that conflict, but served on the South Africa station in the post-war era.

In 1958 she was sold to the Federal Republic of Germany where she was renamed Hipper and used as a cadet training ship.

== Construction ==
Actaeon was laid down by John I. Thornycroft & Company, Woolston, Southampton on 15 May 1944, and launched on 25 July 1945. The vessel was commissioned on 24 July 1946, with the pennant number U07.

Actaeon was powered by Parsons geared turbines driving two shafts, giving a speed of 19.75 knots She was armed with six QF 4 inch Mk XVI anti-aircraft guns in three dual turrets. supplemented by a close-in anti-aircraft outfit of four 40mm Bofors guns in two twin mounts and two single 40mm Bofors. Anti-submarine armament consisted of 110 depth charges and a Hedgehog anti-submarine spigot mortar.

== Royal Navy service ==
Actaeon was completed too late to see service during the Second World War. On 14 January 1947, she arrived in Simonstown, South Africa, to take up position and was regularly moored there. The same year she was officially reclassified as a frigate. In 1948, Actaeon made the first of her annual visits to the small port of Knysna.

From 17 April to 7 May 1952, Actaeon had her last recorded mooring date in the Selborne Graving Dock. On 14 January 1953, Actaeon ended her tour of duty at Cape Town station and returned to the UK to be decommissioned.

== Bundesmarine service ==
As part of the rearmament for its new Bundesmarine in 1957, the Federal Republic of Germany (West Germany) took over a total of seven Royal Navy ships as training frigates in the development phase of the Federal Navy, which, for the sake of simplicity, were grouped under the generic term of Class 138 school frigates, although they are by no means all identical.

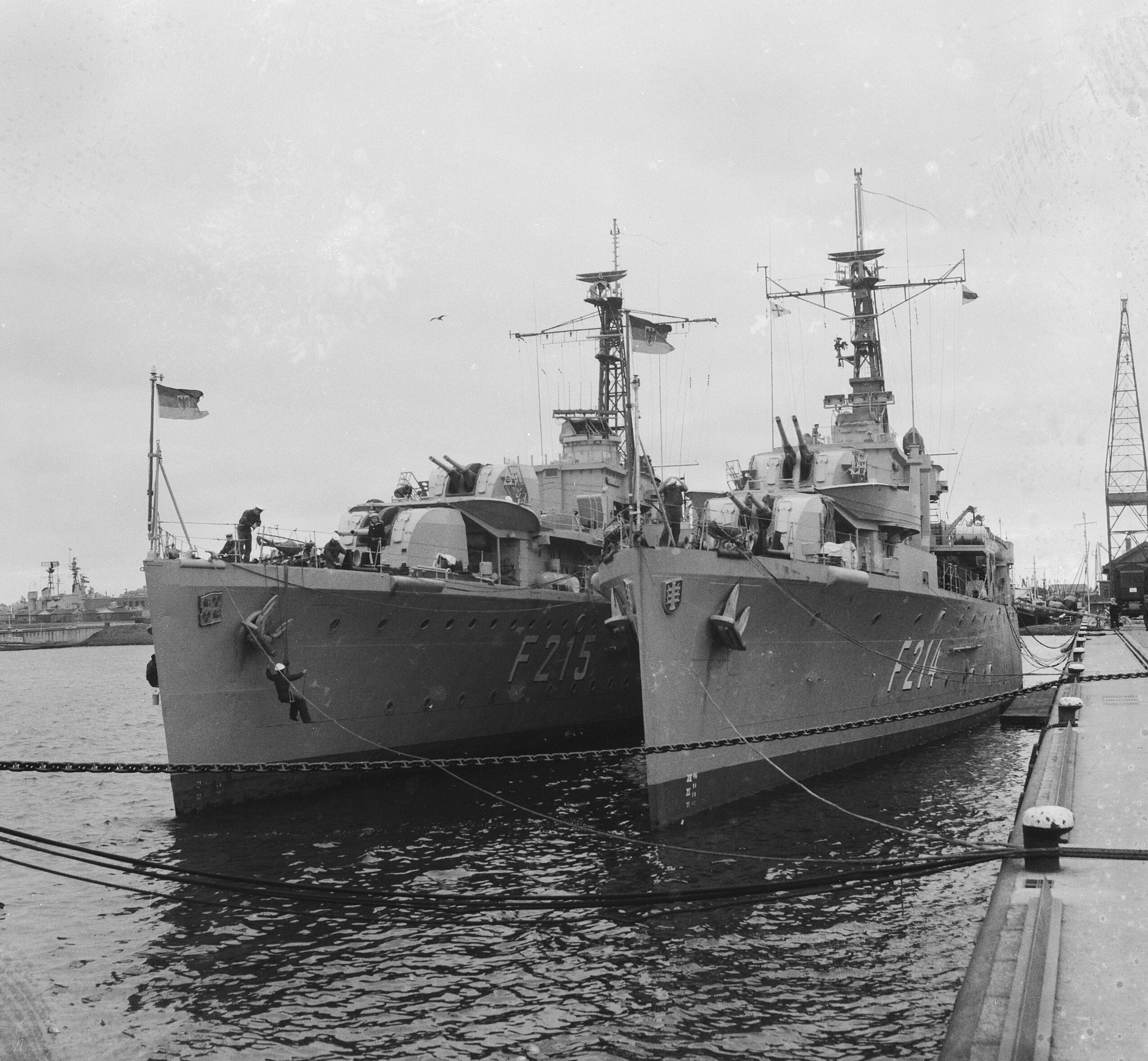
Graf Spee (left, F215) and Hipper (right, F214) at Den Helder on 17 September 1959.

Germany took over Actaeon, which was the only one of the seven ships that was not used during World War II. It was one of three ships of the modified Black Swan class. Germany put the Actaeon into service in January 1959 as Hipper for the Mürwik Naval Academy, where the former sloop-of-war was used for cadet training alongside sister ship Graf Spee. In 1961, the vessel was placed under the command of training ships.

The armament of the ship was changed several times during her service in the Federal Navy.

Hipper came with two twin 102 mm (4-inch) L/45 Mk XVI cannon at the front, which were successively replaced. In addition, she carried three individual 40 mm Bofors guns of an older model. Finally, Hipper and Graf Spee were given twin 40 mm Bofors guns on the bow one above the other and at the end of the widened deck structure two single guns of this type side by side, because they were installed on the new ships of the German Navy.

During the vessel's tenure she undertook a number of foreign voyages, often with her sister ship Graf Spee, several times to North American port cities, from Victoria (British Columbia) in the north to Valparaiso and Cape Horn in the Pacific. Other ports visited ranged from Reykjavik in the north to Lomé, Togo and from Dar es Salaam, Tanzania in the south to Bangkok in the east.

Hipper was taken out of service on 31 July 1964 after only five years of use. There were no plans to convert the frigate into an air traffic control ship due to her age. She served as a pontoon in July 1964, then was sold on 25 October 1967 along with Graf Spee at Hamburg for scrapping.
