= Patricia Russell =

Wife of Bertrand Russell (1910–2004)

Patricia Russell, Countess Russell (1910–2004), was the third wife of philosopher Bertrand Russell and a significant contributor to his book, A History of Western Philosophy.

Lady Russell was born Marjorie Helen Spence in 1910. As her parents had always wanted a boy, she was nicknamed 'Peter,' a name she retained throughout her life. She met Bertrand Russell in 1930, when he was 58 and she was a 20-year-old undergraduate at the University of Oxford, hired by Russell's second wife, Dora Black, as a governess. The two began an affair, and they were married at the Midhurst register office on 18 January 1936. They had one son, Conrad Sebastian Robert Russell, the 5th Earl Russell, who became a prominent historian and one of the leading figures in the Liberal Democrat party. They had an acrimonious separation in 1949.

Patricia was a member of the first board of the Harlow Development Corporation, serving from 1947 to 1950.

== Sources ==
- Ray Monk, Bertrand Russell. The Ghost of Madness. New York: Free Press. 2000.
- Gibberd, Frederick et al. Harlow: the story of a new town. Stevenage: Publications for Companies. 1980.
- Russell, Bertrand. A History of Western Philosophy. London: Unwin Paperbacks. 1984.
