= David Smythe, Lord Methven =

British judge

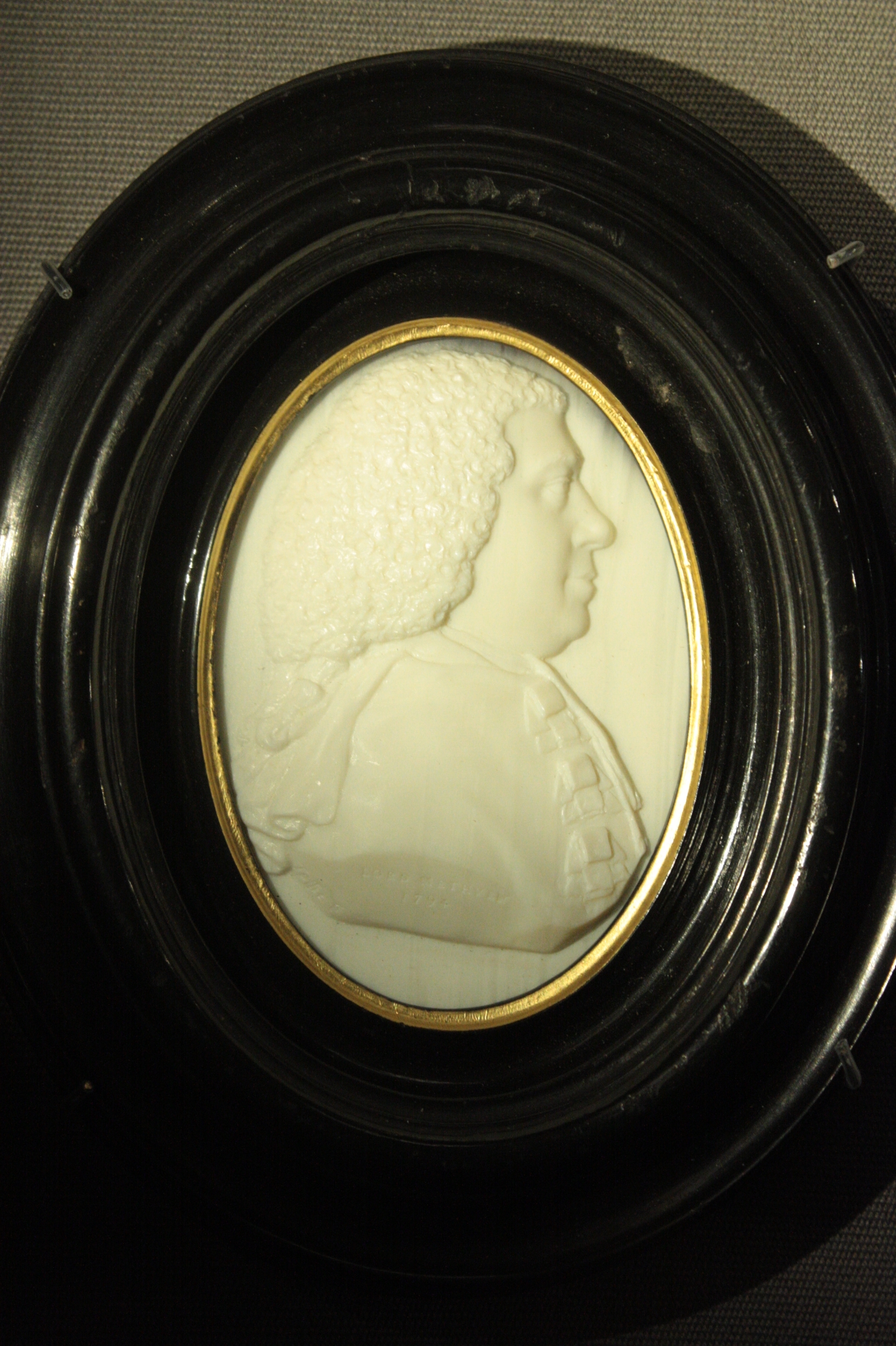
Cameo of David Smythe, 1794, Scottish National Portrait Gallery

The Hon David Smyth or David Smythe, Lord Methven FRSE LLD (1746–1806) was a Scottish lawyer and judge who rose to be a Senator of the College of Justice.

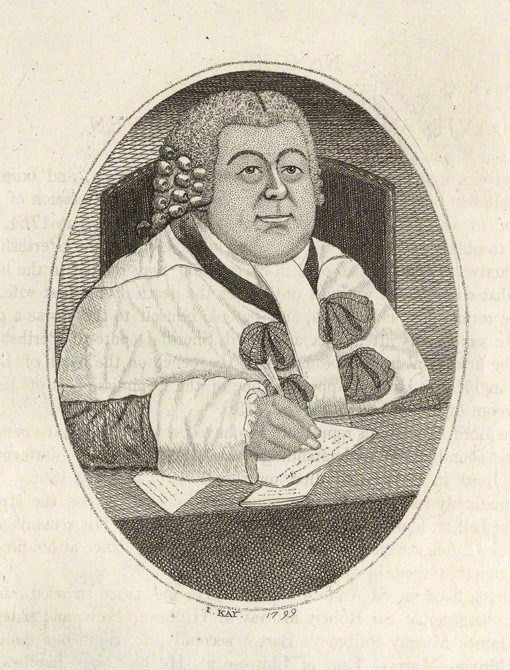
David Smythe, Lord Methven, caricature by John Kay

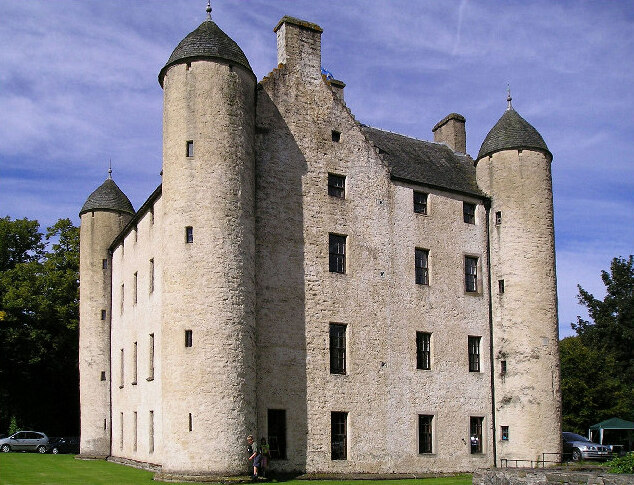
Methven Castle

== Life ==
The son of David Smythe of Methven (d.1764), and Mary Graham, daughter of James Graham of Braco, he was born at the family home of Methven Castle on 17 January 1746.

Having studied for the law, he was admitted advocate on 4 August 1769. From 1786 to 1793 he served as Sheriff Depute of Perthshire. In 1788 he was elected a Fellow of the Royal Society of Edinburgh. His proposers were Robert Arbuthnot, Dugald Stewart and Alexander Fraser Tytler.

Smythe was raised to the bench, in succession to Francis Garden of Gardenstone, on 15 November 1793, taking the title of Lord Methven. He was appointed a commissioner of justiciary on the death of Lord Abercromby, 11 March 1796, resigning the post in 1804. In 1797 he was living at 15 St Andrew Square.

He was taken ill suddenly while walking and died half an hour later at his house at 28 St Andrew Square in Edinburgh on 30 January 1806. He is buried in Canongate Kirkyard on the Royal Mile with his second wife. The grave lies within the eastern extension, close to the church.

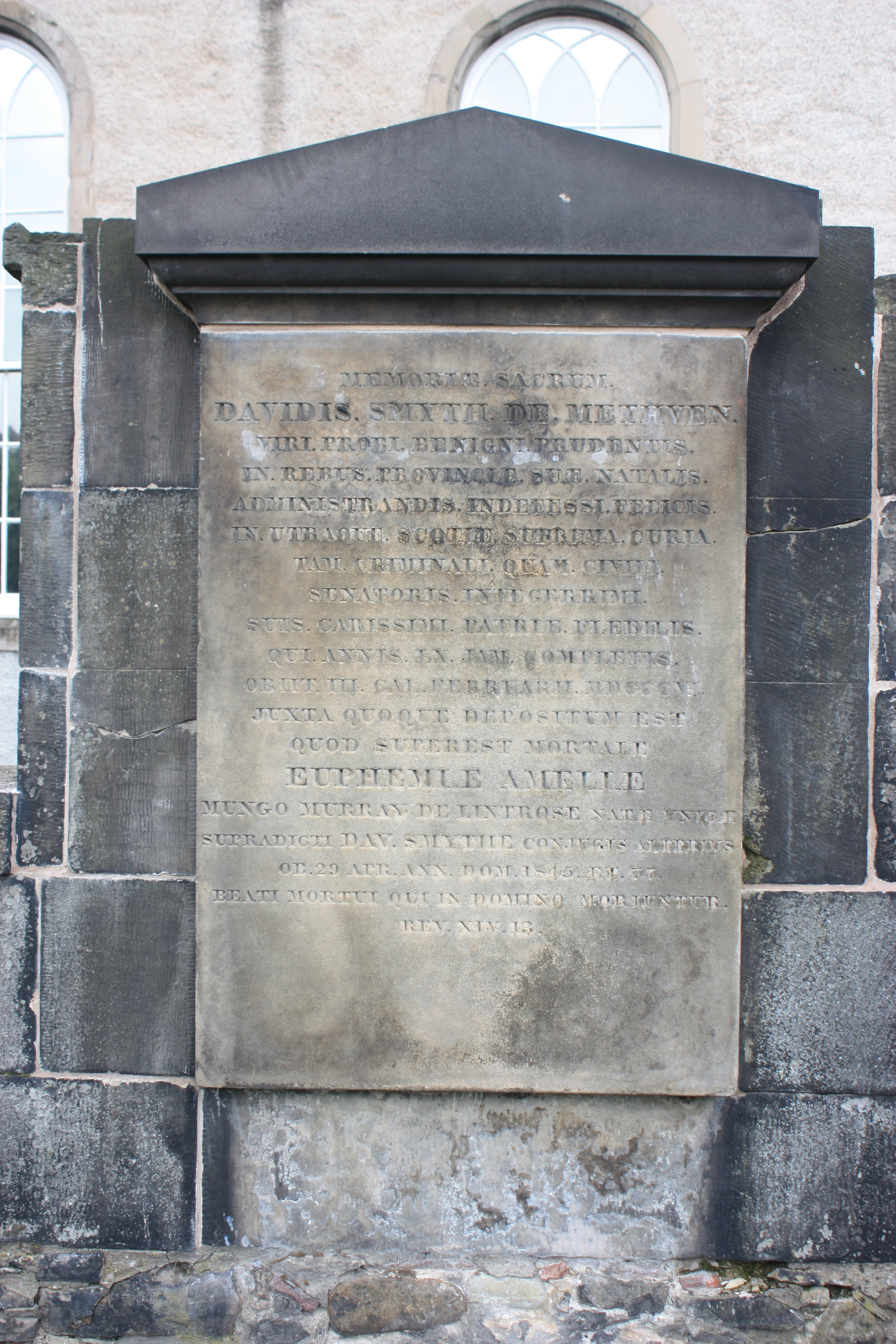
The grave of David Smyth, Lord Methven, Canongate Kirkyard

== Family ==
Smythe married, first, on 8 April 1772, Elizabeth, only daughter of Sir Robert Murray, bart., of Hillhead; she died on 30 June 1785, leaving three sons and four daughters. By his second wife, Euphemia Amelia Murray of Lintrose, a noted singer, daughter of Mungo Murray of Lintrose, who was reckoned a beauty of her time and was the subject of one of Robert Burns's songs, he had two sons and two daughters. Euphemia was known as "The Flower of Strathmore".

Smythe was succeeded in the estate by Robert Smythe, only surviving son of his first marriage; when Robert died in 1847 without issue, the succession fell to the elder son of the second marriage, William Smythe (1805–1895) of Methven Castle.

In 1827 his daughter, Catherine Campbell Smythe, married one of his legal colleagues, David Boyle, Lord Boyle.
