= David Boyle, 7th Earl of Glasgow =

British naval commander and colonial governor

The Right Honourable The Earl of Glasgow GCMG
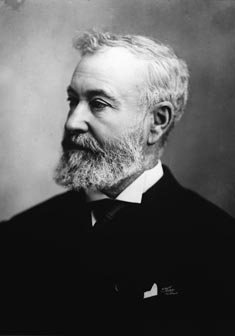
- The 7th Earl of Glasgow

12th Governor of New Zealand
- In office 6 June 1892 – 8 February 1897
- Monarch: Victoria
- Premier: John Ballance; Richard Seddon
- Preceded by: The Earl of Onslow
- Succeeded by: The Earl of Ranfurly

Member of the House of Lords (Note: As Baron Fairlie.)
- Lord Temporal
- In office 23 July 1897 – 13 December 1915
- Preceded by: Peerage created
- Succeeded by: The 8th Earl of Glasgow

Personal details
- Born: 31 May 1833
- Died: 13 December 1915 (aged 82)
- Spouse: Dorothea Elizabeth Thomasina Hunter-Blair (m. 1873)
- Children: 8, including Patrick
- Relatives: David Boyle, Lord Boyle (grandfather); Sir James Fergusson (cousin)

David Boyle, 7th Earl of Glasgow (31 May 1833 – 13 December 1915), was a British naval commander and colonial governor. He served as Governor of New Zealand between 1892 and 1897.

== Background ==
Boyle was the son of Patrick Boyle (eldest son of David Boyle, Lord Boyle, by his first wife, Elizabeth Montgomerie). His mother was Mary Frances Elphinstone-Dalrymple, daughter of Sir Robert Dalrymple-Horn-Elphinstone, 1st Baronet. He succeeded in the earldom in 1890.

== Royal Navy ==
Boyle served with the Royal Navy during the Crimean and Second Opium wars. He was commander of HMS Niobe when the ship wrecked in 1874. He retired with the rank of captain.

== Governor of New Zealand ==
Boyle was the Governor of New Zealand from 1892 to 1897. He was the cousin of another Governor, Sir James Fergusson. The Wellington suburb of Kelburn in New Zealand is named after Viscount Kelburn, the son of Boyle.

Upon his return to the UK, Lord Glasgow was elevated to the Peerage of the United Kingdom in 1897 as Baron Fairlie, of Fairlie in the County of Ayr, to enable him to sit in the House of Lords (the earldom of Glasgow and all its subsidiary titles being in the Peerage of Scotland).

== Later life ==
Lord Glasgow took an active interest in the city of Glasgow.

He received the honorary Doctor of Laws (LL.D) from the University of Glasgow when they celebrated the 450th jubilee in June 1901.

== Family ==
Lord Glasgow married Dorothea Elizabeth Thomasina Hunter-Blair (eldest daughter of Sir Edward Hunter-Blair, 4th Baronet, and his wife Elizabeth, daughter of George Wauchope), on 23 July 1873. They had five sons and three daughters:

- Capt. Patrick James Boyle, 8th Earl of Glasgow (18 June 1874 – 14 December 1963)
- Lt. Hon. Edward George Boyle (16 June 1875 – 23 October 1898), unmarried.
- Lady Augusta Helen Elizabeth Boyle (25 August 1876 – 12 May 1967), married (1) on 28 April 1898 Charles Lindsay Orr-Ewing (who died in 1903), and (2) on 30 July 1914 Thomas Inskip, 1st Viscount Caldecote.
- Lady Alice Mary Boyle (18 December 1877 – 1 Jan 1958), married on 18 July 1901 her second cousin, General Sir Charles Fergusson of Kilkerran, 7th Bt.
- Lady Dorothy Montagu Boyle (14 March 1879 – 17 March 1968), married on 25 April 1899 Gathorne Gathorne-Hardy, 3rd Earl of Cranbrook.
- Capt. Hon. James Boyle (11 March 1880 – 18 October 1914), married 15 September 1908 Katherine Isabel Salvin Bowlby. Killed in action in World War I.
- Air Cdre Hon. John David Boyle, CBE, DSO. (8 July 1884 – 1974), married (1) on 9 December 1913 Ethel Hodges (who died 1932), and (2) on 4 October 1934 Marie Gibb.
- Hon. Alan Reginald Boyle (8 October 1886 – 10 October 1958), married on 5 February 1916 to Isabel Julia Hull.

Lord Glasgow died in December 1915, aged 82, and was succeeded in the earldom by his eldest son, Patrick. The Countess of Glasgow died in January 1923.

== Notes ==
Government offices
Preceded by The Earl of Onslow	Governor of New Zealand; 1892–1897	Succeeded by The Earl of Ranfurly
Peerage of Scotland
Preceded by George Boyle	Earl of Glasgow; 1890–1915	Succeeded by Patrick Boyle
Peerage of the United Kingdom
New creation	Baron Fairlie; 1897–1915; Member of the House of Lords (1897–1915)	Succeeded by Patrick Boyle
