= David Boyle, Lord Boyle =

British judge

The Right Honourable Lord Boyle PC
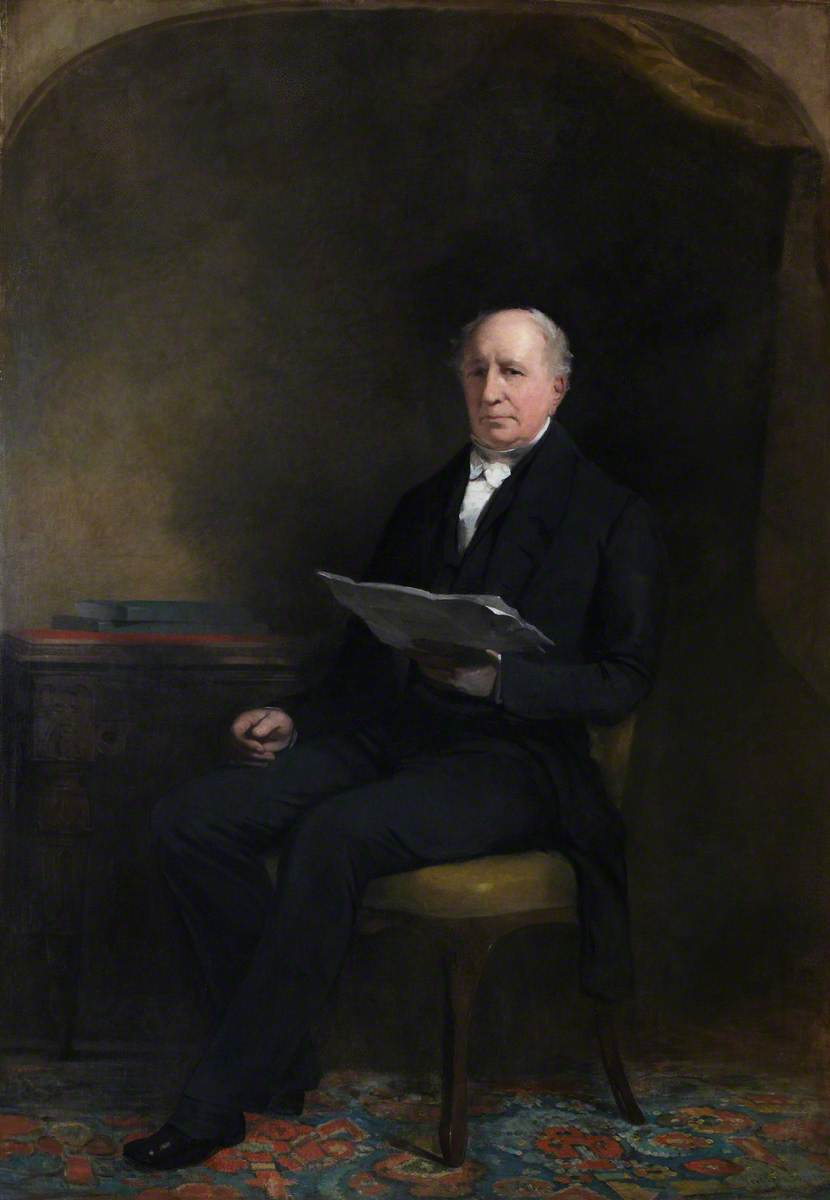
- Portrait of Boyle by John Watson Gordon

Lord President of Court of Session
- In office 7 October 1841 – 5 May 1852
- Preceded by: Lord Granton
- Succeeded by: Lord Colonsay

Personal details
- Born: 26 July 1772 Irvine
- Died: 30 January 1853 (aged 80)
- Resting place: Dundonald, South Ayrshire
- Spouses: Elizabeth Montgomery (m. 1804; died 1822) Catherine Campbell Smythe (m. 1827)
- Children: several, including Alexander and George
- Relatives: John Boyle, 2nd Earl of Glasgow (grandfather); Alexander Dunlop (grandfather); David Boyle, 7th Earl of Glasgow (grandson)

David Boyle, Lord Boyle FRSE (26 July 1772 – 4 February 1853) was a British judge.

== Life ==
Boyle was born at Shewalton near Irvine on 26 July 1772, the son of Elizabeth Dunlop, daughter of Professor Alexander Dunlop, and the Honorable Reverend Patrick Boyle of Shewalton (died 1798), son of John Boyle, 2nd Earl of Glasgow. His father had inherited the Shewalton estate through his uncle, Patrick Boyle, Lord Shewalton, who had never married.

He studied law at the University of St Andrews (1787) and then at the University of Glasgow (1789).

He became an advocate in 1793 and rose to be Solicitor General. He was based at 41 George Street in Edinburgh.

In 1798 he inherited the Shewalton estate on his father's death.

He was Member of Parliament (MP) for Ayrshire from 1807 to 1811 and served as Solicitor General for Scotland during that period. In 1811 he was appointed a Senator of the College of Justice, with the judicial title Lord Boyle. He was Lord Justice Clerk from 1811 to 1841. He became a Privy Counsellor in 1820 and Lord Justice General from 1841 to 1852.

From 1815 to 1817 he served as Rector of the University of Glasgow.

In 1833 his address was listed as 28 Charlotte Square at the west end of Edinburgh's New Town.

== Family ==
Boyle married firstly, in 1804, Elizabeth Montgomerie (died April 1822), daughter of Alexander Montgomerie, and niece of Hugh Montgomerie, 12th Earl of Eglinton. They had several children, including Patrick Boyle, father of David Boyle, 7th Earl of Glasgow; and Alexander Boyle, a vice-admiral in the Royal Navy.

Boyle married secondly, in 1827, Catherine Campbell Smythe, daughter of David Smythe, Lord Methven. Their children included George David Boyle, who became Dean of Salisbury. Boyle died on 4 February 1853, aged 80. His second wife died in December 1880.

His daughter, Helen, married Charles Dalrymple Fergusson, Baronet of Kilkerran.

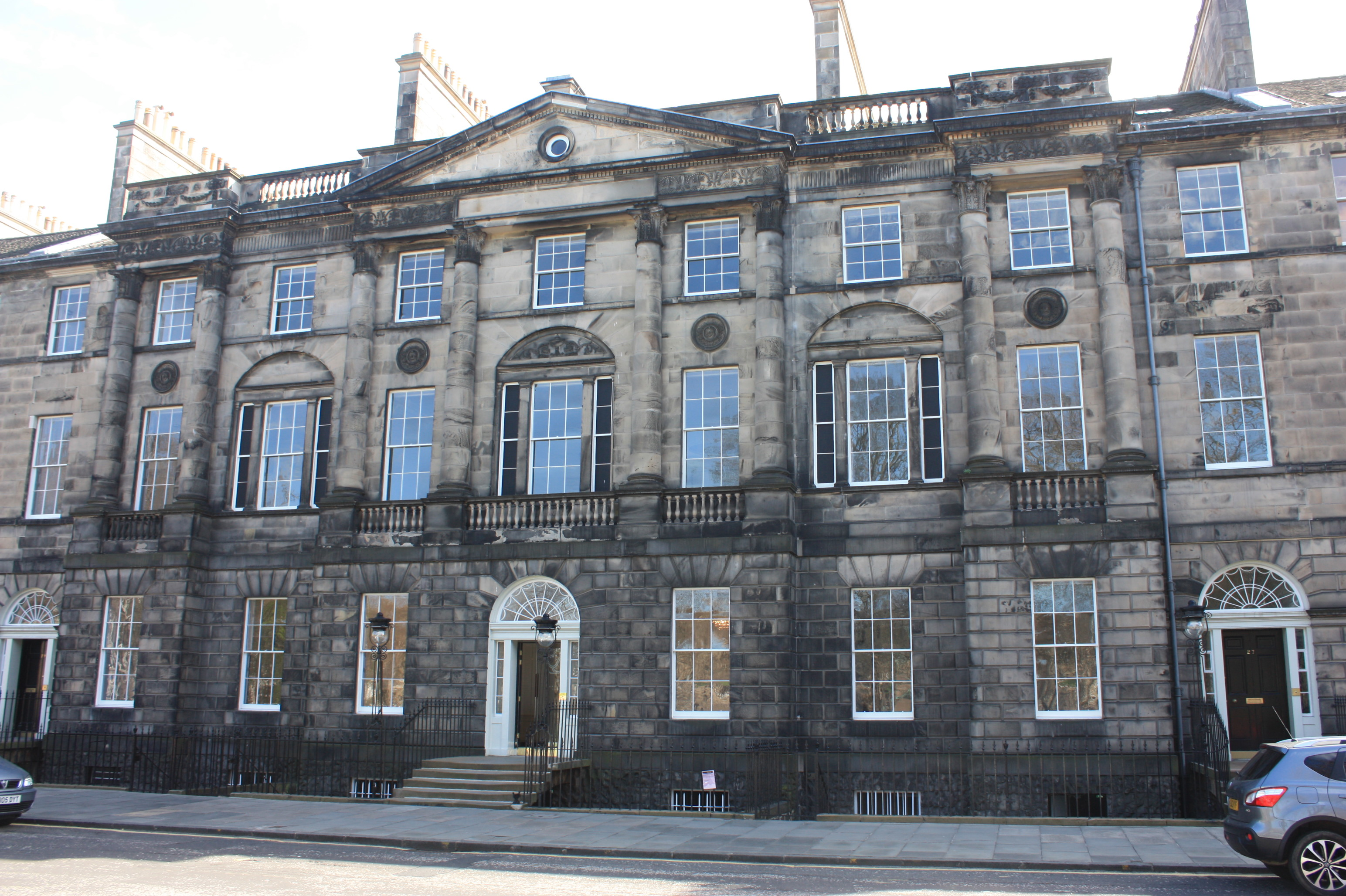
The central pavilion on the south side of Charlotte Square, home of Lord Boyle

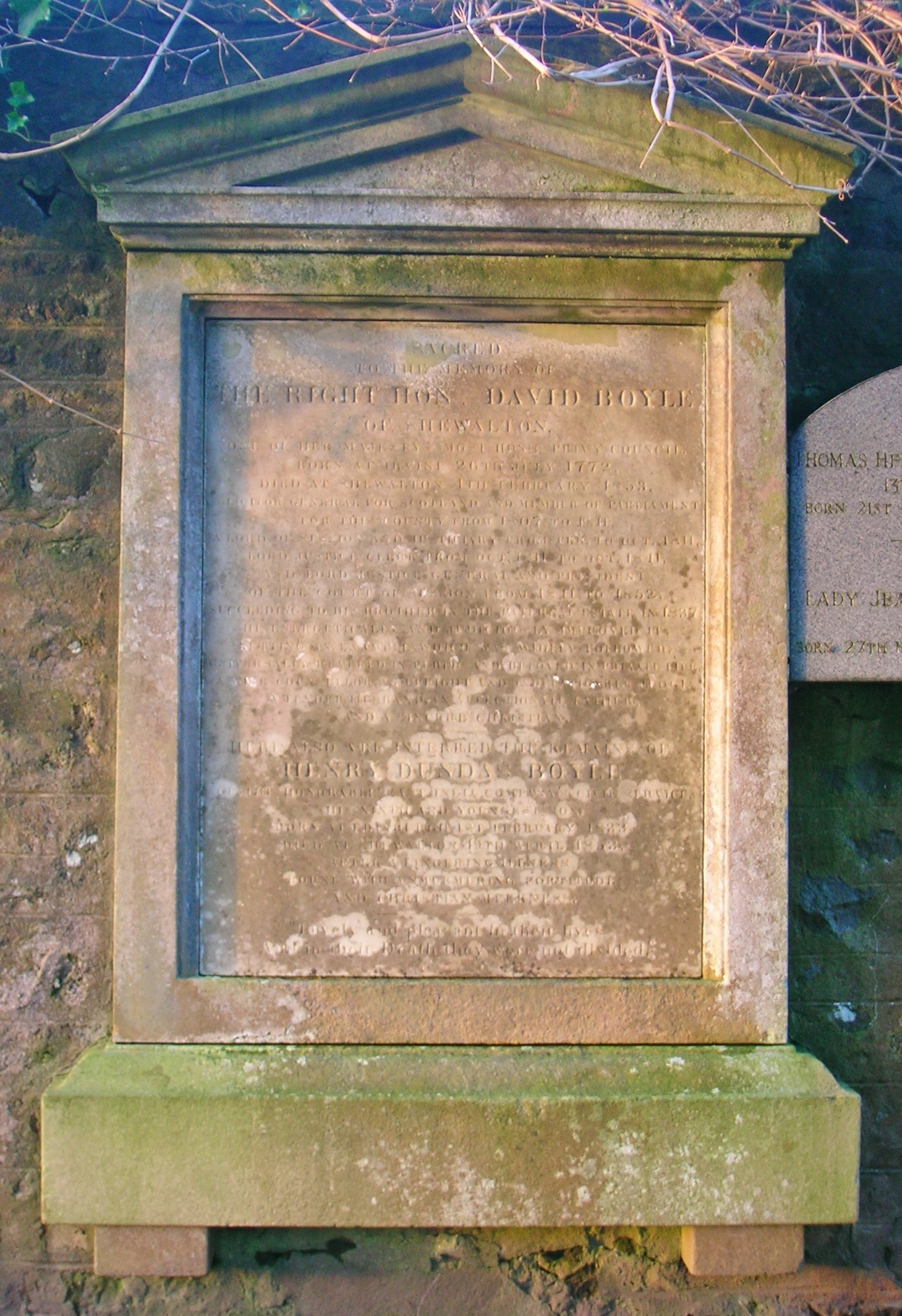
Memorial to David Boyle at Dundonald.

== Memberships ==
- Highland Society (1804)
- Fellow of the Royal Society of Edinburgh (1820)

== Notes ==
Parliament of the United Kingdom
Preceded by Sir Hew Dalrymple-Hamilton, Bt	Member of Parliament for Ayrshire; 1807 – 1811	Succeeded by Sir Hew Dalrymple-Hamilton, Bt
Legal offices
Preceded by John Clerk	Solicitor General for Scotland; 1807–1811	Succeeded by David Monypenny
Preceded by Charles Hope	Lord Justice Clerk; 1811–1841	Succeeded by John Hope
Preceded by Lord Granton	Lord Justice General; 1841–1852	Succeeded by Lord Colonsay
Academic offices
Preceded by Baron Lynedoch	Rector of the University of Glasgow; 1815–1817	Succeeded by Earl of Glasgow
