= Selborne Graving Dock =

Dry dock in Simon's Town naval base, Western Cape, South Africa

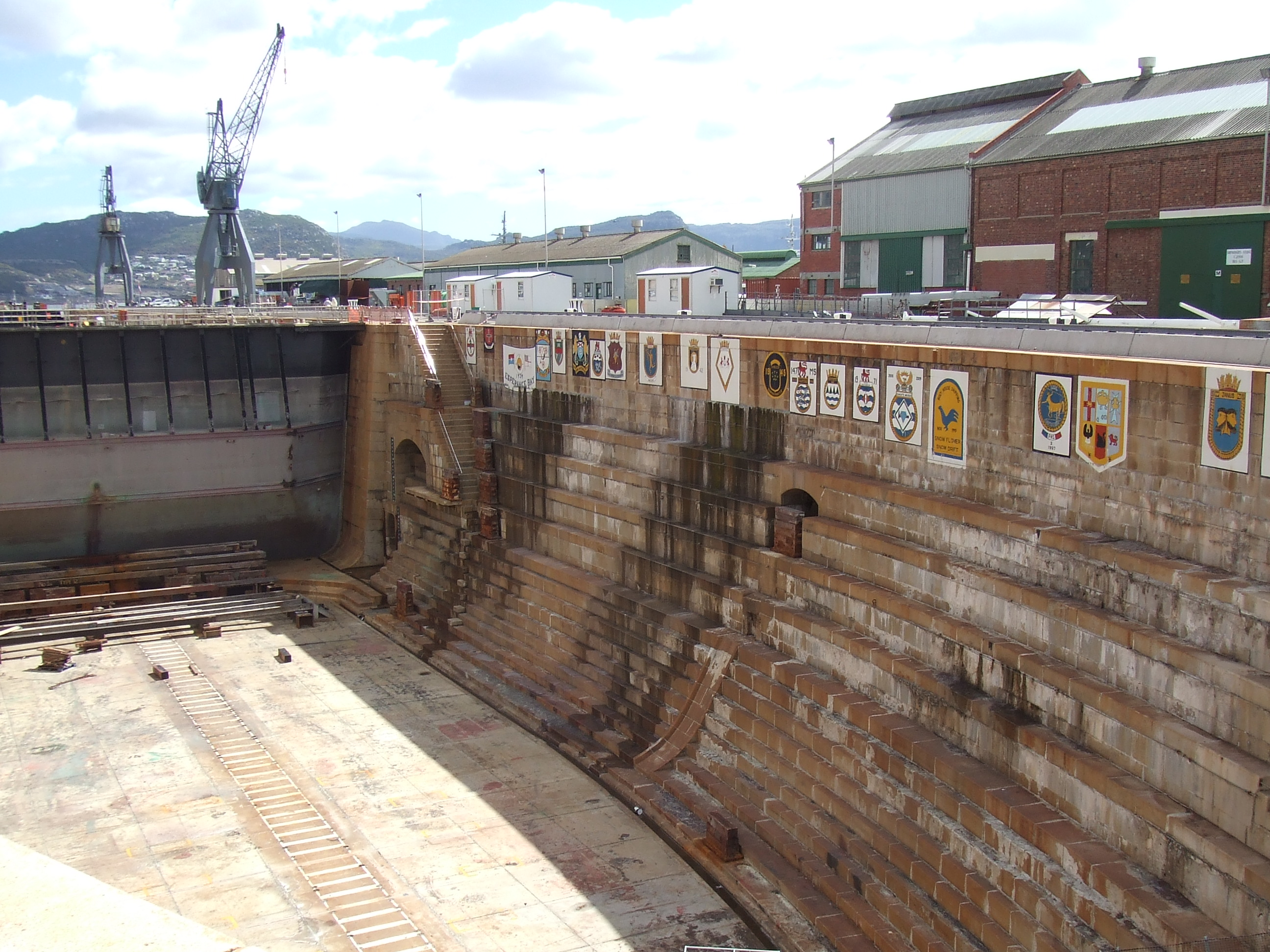

- Location within Cape Town

General information
- Type: Dry dock
- Architectural style: Graving
- Location: Naval Base Simon's Town, Simon's Town, Western Cape, South Africa
- Coordinates: 34°11′31″S 18°26′24″E
- Construction started: 15 November 1906; 119 years ago
- Inaugurated: 3 November 1910; 115 years ago
- Client: British Admiralty
- Owner: Department of Defence (South Africa)

Design and construction
- Main contractor: Sir John Jackson Ltd

The Selborne Graving Dock is a dry dock in Simon's Town, South Africa. It is situated within the Naval Base Simon's Town. It is named for William Palmer, 2nd Earl of Selborne, the High Commissioner for Southern Africa at the time of construction.

== History ==
On 27 July 1900 a tender for the construction of a yard was awarded to Sir John Jackson Ltd. The construction used Portland cement from England, as well as granite blocks from Norway. The foundation stone was laid on 15 November 1906, and the dry dock was opened on 3 November 1910; 115 years ago, by the Duke of Connaught.

The Dockyard (including the dry dock) was handed to South Africa in 1957, as part of the Simonstown Agreement.

== Images ==
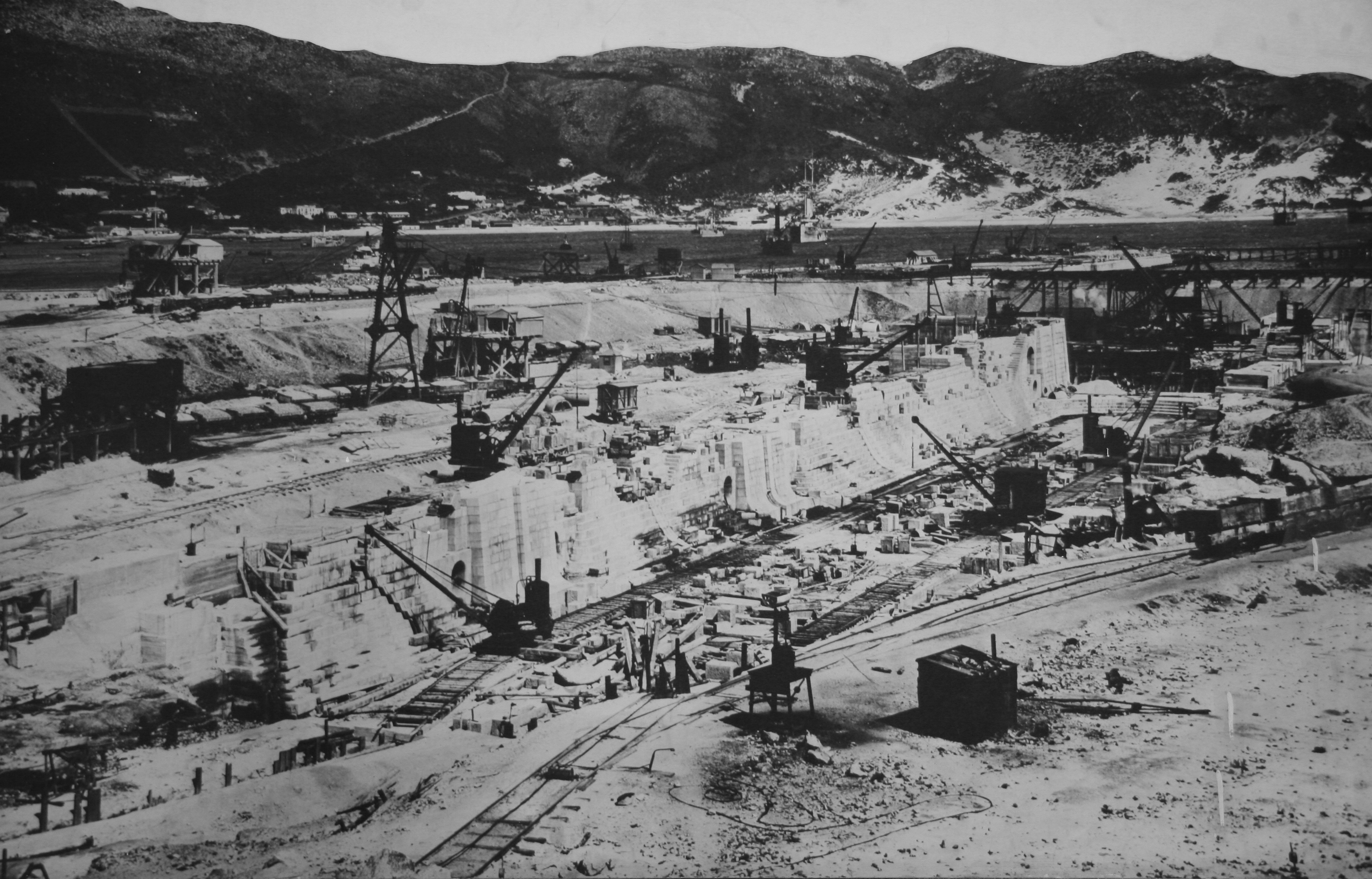
Construction in 1906

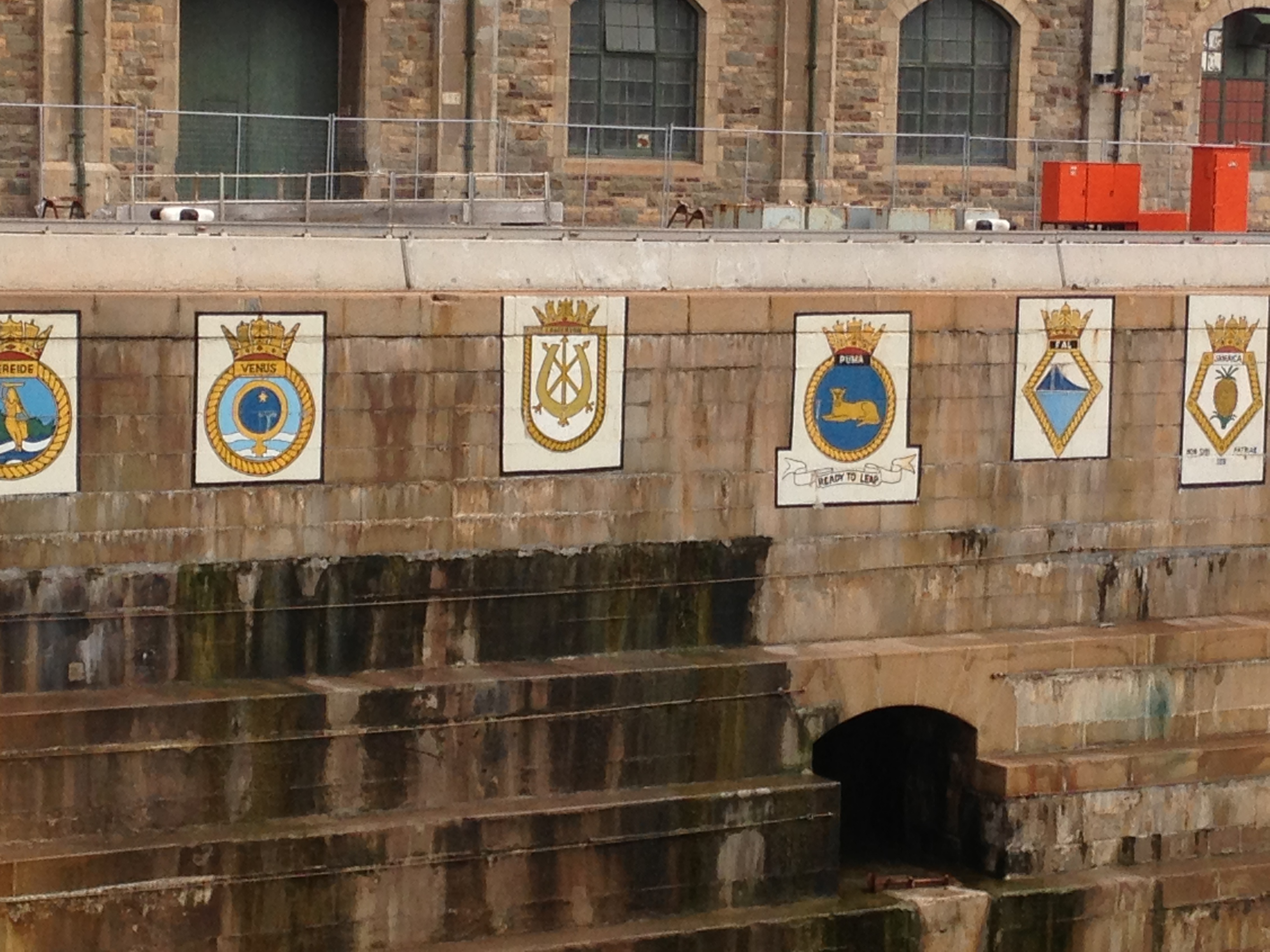
The ships crests painted on the wall

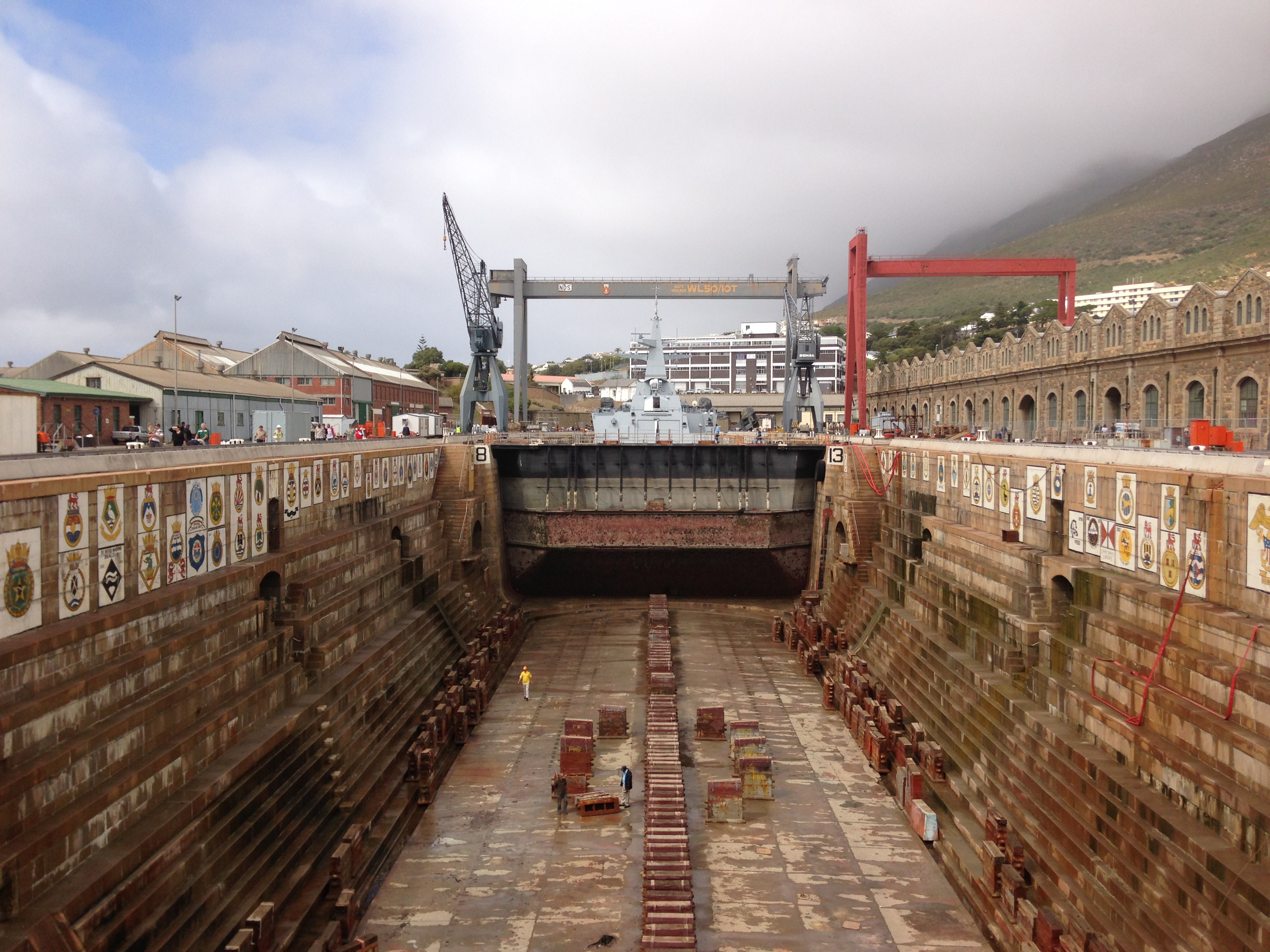
The dock split to allow two ships to enter
