= George Boyle, 4th Earl of Glasgow =

British peer

George Boyle, 4th Earl of Glasgow, GCH FRS (26 March 1766 – 6 July 1843), styled Lord Boyle until 1775, was a British peer.

He was the son of John Boyle, 3rd Earl of Glasgow, and his wife, Elizabeth, the daughter of George Ross, 13th Lord Ross. In 1775, he inherited his father's titles, was a Tory Scottish representative peer from 1790 to 1815, and was created Baron Ross in the Peerage of the United Kingdom that year to give him a seat in the House of Lords. From 1810 to 1820, he was Lord Lieutenant of Renfrewshire, Rector of the University of Glasgow from 1817 to 1819 and Lord Lieutenant of Ayrshire from 1820 to 1842. He was appointed a GCH in 1830.

On 7 March 1788, Glasgow married Lady Augusta Hay (1766–1822), the third daughter of James Hay, 15th Earl of Erroll. They had six children:

- John Boyle, styled Lord Boyle, RN (1789–1818)
- Lady Isabella Margaret (1790–1834)
- Hon. James Boyle, later 5th Earl of Glasgow (1792–1869)
- Lady Elizabeth Boyle (1794–1819)
- Lady Augusta Boyle (1801–1876), married Lord Frederick FitzClarence.
- Hon. William Boyle (1802–1819)

After the death of his wife in 1822, Glasgow married Julia Sinclair, the third daughter of Sir John Sinclair, 1st Baronet. They had two children:

- Hon. George Frederick Boyle, later 6th Earl of Glasgow (1825–1890)
- Lady Diana Boyle (1828–1877), married John Packington, 2nd Baron Hampton.

On his death in 1843, Glasgow's titles passed to his eldest son, James, by his first wife.

Honorary titles
Preceded by William McDowall	Lord Lieutenant of Renfrewshire; 1810–1820	Succeeded by The Lord Blantyre
Preceded by The Earl of Eglinton	Lord Lieutenant of Ayrshire; 1820–1842	Succeeded by The Earl of Eglinton
Academic offices
Preceded by Lord Boyle	Rector of the University of Glasgow; 1817–1819	Succeeded by Kirkman Finlay
Peerage of Scotland
Preceded by John Boyle	Earl of Glasgow; 1775–1843	Succeeded by James Boyle
Peerage of the United Kingdom
New creation	Baron Ross; 1815–1843	Succeeded by James Boyle
