= Richard Allibond =

English judge

Sir Richard Alibon
- Born: 1636
- Died: 22 August 1688 (aged 51–52); Brownlow Street, Holborn
- Burial place: St Peter and St Paul, Dagenham; 51.5397°N 0.1621°E
- Education: English College, Douai
- Occupation: Judge
- Spouse: Barbara Blackstone
- Relatives: Peter Allibond (grandfather); John Allibond (uncle)

Sir Richard Allibond or Allibone (1636–1688) was an English judge and justice of the King's Bench.

== Biography ==
He was a son of Job Allibond, and grandson of Peter Allibond, D.D., the rector of Chenies, Buckinghamshire. Job, having become a Roman Catholic, was disinherited, but he obtained a considerable place in the Post Office, which afforded him a comfortable subsistence and enabled him to give his children a liberal education. Richard, born in 1636, was entered as a student at the English College, Douai, on 24 March 1652. On returning to England he began his legal education at Gray's Inn in 1663. He was listed as a member there in 1670.

In 1686 he was selected by King James II of England to be one of his counsel, and was knighted. On 28 April 1687 he was made a serjeant-at-law, and then appointed to fill the place of a puisne judge in the King's Bench, vacated by the discharge of Francis Wythens. The appointment was very unpopular in consequence of Allibond being a Catholic, and Lord Macaulay asserts that he was even more ignorant of the law than Sir Robert Wright, who had been appointed Lord Chief Justice of England. At the famous Trial of the Seven Bishops in Trinity Term, 1688, Sir Richard Allibond laid down the most arbitrary doctrines, and exerted himself to the utmost to procure their conviction.

Lord Macaulay says 'he showed such gross ignorance of law and history as brought on him the contempt of all who heard him.' On going to the home circuit in July, immediately after the trial, he had the indecency, in his charge to the Croydon jury, to speak against the verdict of acquittal in the case of the bishops, and to stigmatise their petition to the King as a libel that tended to sedition. His death, which occurred in the following month on 22 August 1688 at his house in Brownlow Street, Holborn, saved him from the attainder with which he would probably have been visited if he had lived until after the Glorious Revolution. He was buried on 4 September 1688 near the grave of his mother at Dagenham in Essex, where a sumptuous monument was erected to his memory. His wife was Barbara Blakiston, of the family of Sir Francis Blakiston of Gibside, Durham, of the Blakiston baronets
