= Allibond =

Allibond is a surname. Notable people with the surname include:

- John Allibond (1597–1658), English headmaster of Magdalen College School
- Peter Allibond (1560–1629), English translator
- Richard Allibond (1636–1688), English judge
