= Allibone =

Allibone is a surname. Notable people with the surname include:

- Jill Allibone (1932–1998), English architectural historian
- Samuel Austin Allibone (1816–1889), American author, editor, and bibliographer
- Thomas Allibone (1903–2003), English physicist

== See also ==
- Allibond
