= RAF Chenies =

RAF Chenies
- Chenies, Buckinghamshire in England
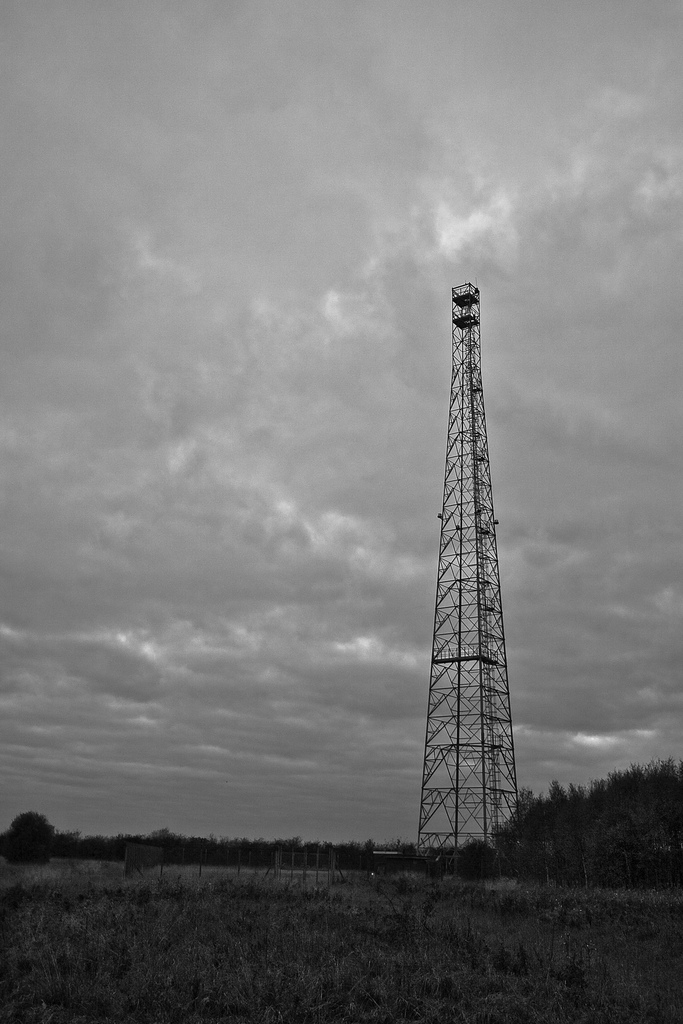
- Former HF transmitting antenna

Site information
- Type: Royal Air Force station
- Owner: Air Ministry
- Operator: Royal Air Force
- Controlled by: RAF Bomber Command

Location
- Coordinates: 51.689670°N 0.530662°W
- Grid reference: TQ015997

Site history
- Built: 1930

RAF Chenies is a former Royal Air Force radar intercept station located 1.4 miles (2.3 km) North of the village of Chenies in Buckinghamshire, built in the 1930s and originally used by RAF Bomber Command during the Second World War repurposed in the 1950s as part of the ROTOR air defence programme.

== Culture ==
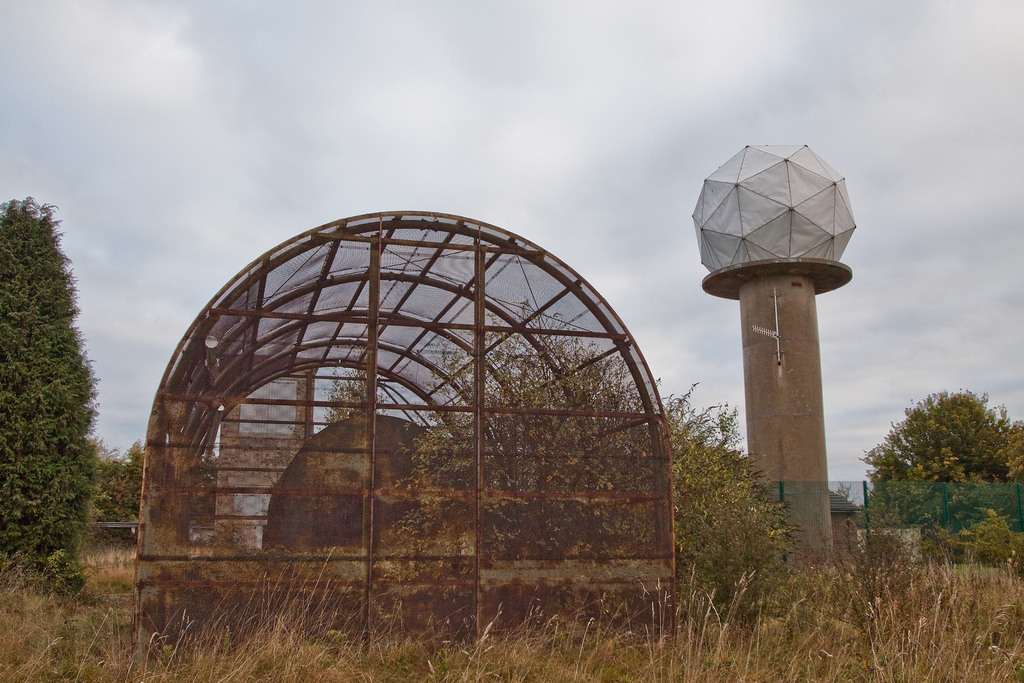
The Met Office radome sited next to abandoned structures

During later years of operation when large parts of the site was disused the Operations Room was used by the technicians to play a game called "The Chenies Ball". A volleyball net would be set up across the centre of the room and a variant of the game volleyball would be played where players were permitted to bounce the ball off the walls.

== Current use ==
In the 1980s the station was used as the site for a Met Office weather radar station with a 'golf ball' styled Radome, still in use today. As of September 2012, the site is being transformed to accommodate housing. All of the derelict buildings have been demolished, the antenna tower has been removed and construction is underway on at least two houses. The active radar installation is still securely fenced off inside the larger compound.
