= Richard Jerningham =

Sir Richard Jerningham
- Died: February or March 1525
- Spouse: Anne Sapcote
- Issue: Richard (illegitimate); Robert (illegitimate); Mary (illegitimate)
- Father: Sir John Jerningham
- Mother: Isabel Clifton

Sir Richard Jerningham (died February or March 1525) was a soldier and diplomat in the service of King Henry VIII.

== Family ==
According to MacMahon, the Jerningham family was ‘of ancient lineage’ and can be traced from Robert fitz Jernegan, a Suffolk knight who lived around the year 1200. Richard Jerningham was the younger son of Sir John Jerningham (d.1503) and Isabel Clifton, the daughter of Sir Gervase Clifton (d.1471) and Isabel Herbert. He had an elder brother, Edward Jerningham (d. 6 January 1515) of Somerleyton, Suffolk, who married Mary Scrope, and several sisters, including Margaret (or Mary) Jerningham, who married Thomas Stanhope, esquire, by whom she was the grandmother of Anne Stanhope, Duchess of Somerset.

== Career ==
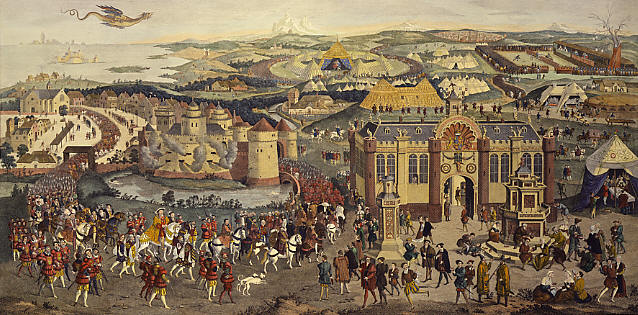
The Field of Cloth of Gold, at which Sir Richard Jerningham was one of the attendants of King Henry VIII

Jerningham was appointed a Gentleman of the Chamber to Henry VIII, and in January 1511 was sent to Germany to purchase armour on the King's behalf. He spent the following two years on the continent, travelling to Milan, Brussels, Innsbruck, and Venice. He had returned to England by July 1513, and accompanied the King on his campaign in France. He was among those knighted by the King in the Cathedral at Tournai on 25 September of that year.

He remained at Tournai for most of the ensuing five years, being appointed Marshal and Treasurer in 1515, and Deputy of the city in January 1517. He surrendered the keys of the city on 8 February 1519 in accordance with the King's agreement to return Tournai to the French.

In May 1519 Jerningham was one of the 'sad and ancient knights' appointed to the King's reorganized Privy Chamber. According to Hall's Chronicle, the King's Council called before them:

divers of the Privy Chamber which had been in the French Court, and banished them the Court for divers considerations, laying nothing particularly to their charges . . . which discharge out of the Court grieved sore the hearts of these young men, which were called the King’s minions. Then was there four sad and ancient knights put into the King’s Privy Chamber, whose names were Sir Richard Wingfield, Sir Richard Jerningham, Sir Richard Weston, and Sir William Kingston, and divers officers were changed in all places.

On 11 April 1520 Jerningham witnessed a treaty of commerce between Henry VIII and Emperor Charles V. In June of that year he accompanied the King to the Field of Cloth of Gold at Calais, where he was one of the challengers in the jousts, and attended the King at his meeting with the Emperor at Gravelines in July.

During the next two years Jerningham was twice sent on embassies to France. In January 1522 he was appointed to the post of Chamberlain of the Exchequer for life. When war once again broke out between France and England in May 1522, he was appointed Treasurer of the King's wars 'beyond the sea', and was with the large army under the Earl of Surrey which invaded Picardy between 30 August and 14 October, 'burning many towns, castles and villages'. In June 1523 he was despatched to Spain, where he and Richard Sampson served together as ambassadors. He accompanied Charles V's army when the Emperor invaded Guyenne in December 1523. While Jerningham was in Spain, Wolsey wrote to him on 4 December 1523 advising that 'the King's Highness, in consideration of your travails and pains sustained there, hath appointed you to be his Vice Chamberlain, and the same office doth keep and reserve for you purposely till your coming and return'.

Jerningham was given leave to return from Spain on 25 March 1524, and was back in England by May. In August 1524 he was sent on an embassy to Margaret of Austria in the Low Countries. In a letter to Sampson on 26 September 1524, Wolsey referred to Jerningham as the King's 'trusty councillor', indicating that he had at some point been sworn of the Privy Council. He returned to England in November, and died a few months later, in February or March 1525. His will was proved 24 July 1526.

== Marriage and issue ==
Jerningham married, about 1518, Anne Sapcote (d. 14 March 1559), the daughter and heir of Sir Guy Sapcote by Margaret Wolston, daughter and heir of Sir Guy Wolston (d.1504).

Anne (née Sapcote) was the widow of John Broughton (d. 24 January 1518) of Toddington, Bedfordshire, by whom she had a son and three daughters:

- John Broughton (d.1528).
- Katherine Broughton (d. 23 April 1535), who was the ward firstly of Cardinal Wolsey, and secondly Agnes, Duchess of Norfolk, who married Katherine, as his first wife, to her eldest son, William Howard, 1st Baron Howard of Effingham.
- Anne Broughton (d. 16 May 1562), who married, as his second wife, by dispensation dated 24 May 1539, Sir Thomas Cheney, Lord Warden of the Cinque Ports. There is a monument to her at Toddington.
- Elizabeth Broughton, who died in 1524. There is a monument to her at Chenies.

There were no issue of Jerningham's marriage, and after his death his widow, Anne (née Sapcote) married John Russell, 1st Earl of Bedford, by whom she was the mother of Francis Russell, 2nd Earl of Bedford. She was buried at Chenies, Buckinghamshire, on 21 March 1559.
