= Bedford Chapel =

Bedford Chapel may refer to:

- St_Michael's, Chenies#Bedford_Chapel
- Bedford Chapel, Bloomsbury
- Bedford Chapel, Golders Green Crematorium
