= William Cure the Younger =

English sculptor and mason

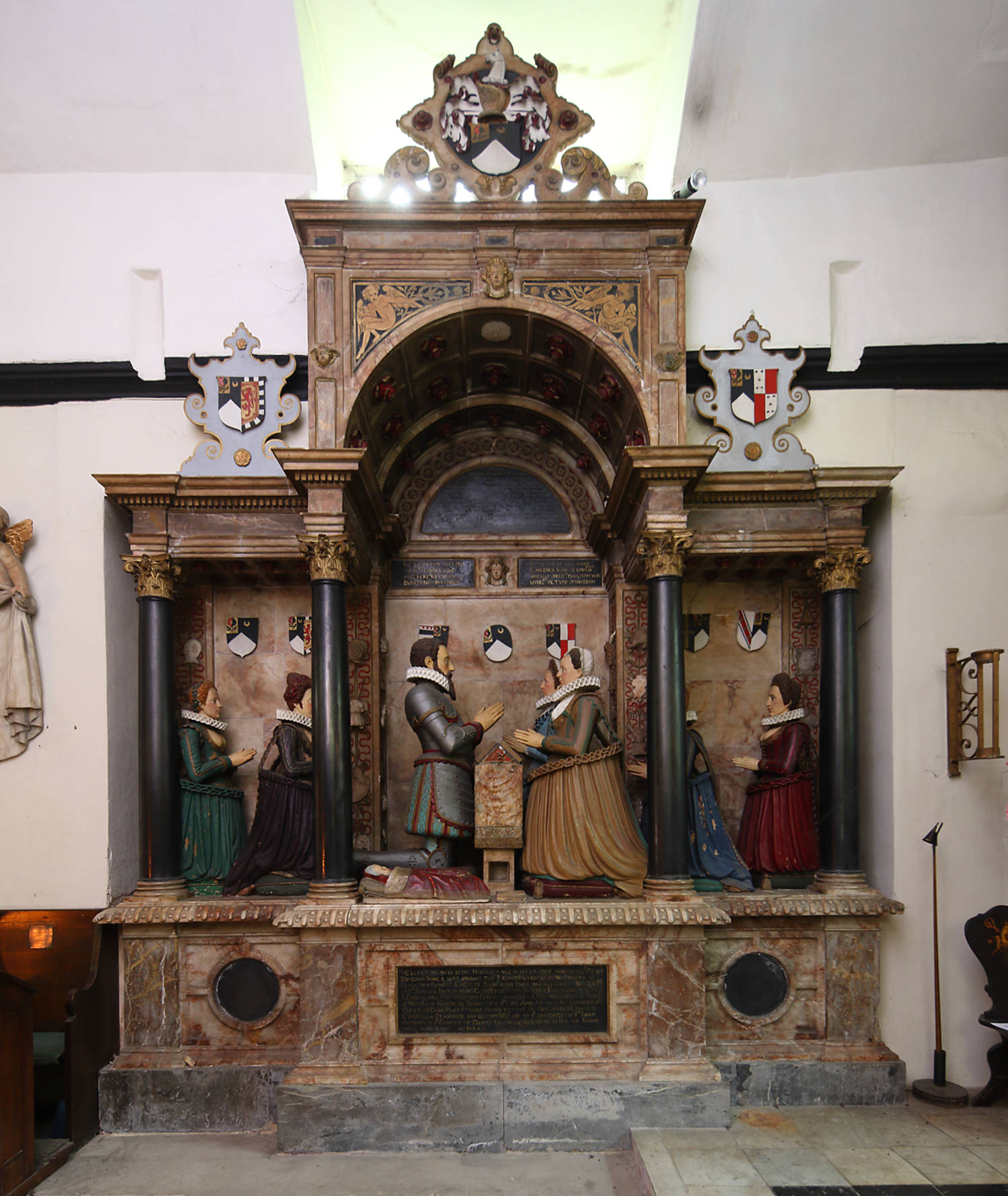
Monument to Sir Roger Aston and family by William Cure the Younger, 1611-13. St Dunstan, Cranford, London.

William Cure the Younger (fl. 1605; d. 1632) was an English sculptor and mason who served as King's Master Mason from 1605 to 1632. The son of Cornelius Cure and brother of Edward Cure, he inherited both his father's workshop and his position in the Office of Works, though he proved less competent than his predecessors in the Cure family dynasty.

== Early life and career ==
William Cure was born into a family of established sculptors and masons. His father, Cornelius Cure, had developed a distinctive classical style for monuments and chimney-pieces that brought the family considerable success. William presumably worked alongside his father before being appointed joint Master Mason in the Office of Works on 5 April 1605. He succeeded as sole Master Mason following his father's death, which occurred in either 1608 or 1609.

== Professional positions ==
Cure held the position of King's Master Mason from 1605 until his death in 1632, though his effectiveness in the role was questionable. He also styled himself "King's Master Sculptor" without formal appointment to such a position, possibly expressing resentment at the creation of this separate post for Maximilian Colt in 1608. By 1618, he had become a freeman of the Masons' Company of London and served as a member of its Court of Assistants in 1630.

== Royal commissions ==
In his capacity as Master Mason, Cure undertook various works for royal residences, though with mixed success. Between 1607 and 1609, he dismantled, repaired, and re-erected two fountains in the Privy Garden at Hampton Court. In 1613-14, he made a large chimney-piece without an overmantel for the hall of Somerset House, though this work was divided between him and other craftsmen, with Cure providing only one chimney-piece compared to at least three by his brother Edward. In 1615-16, he created two additional fountains for Hampton Court's Privy Garden and also worked on a fountain for Nonsuch Palace during the same period.

== Architectural sculptures ==
Cure's most documented architectural sculptures were the statues of King Henry VIII, Queen Anne of Denmark, and Charles, Prince of Wales (later King Charles I) for the Great Gate of Trinity College, Cambridge, completed in 1614-15. Contemporary and modern assessments have judged these works to be of poor quality, suggesting a decline in the family's artistic standards.

== Professional difficulties ==
Cure's tenure as Master Mason was marked by significant problems. In 1619, he failed to conduct the masonry work for Inigo Jones's Banqueting House at Whitehall, leading to his suspension from 1 June 1619. Nicholas Stone took over the work, and although Cure was technically reinstated in 1621, Stone had effectively superseded him. The suspension followed allegations that Cure had been absent from his duties for five consecutive months and had continued to be "careless and negligent" about royal works elsewhere.

His difficulties extended to private commissions. In 1619, the Russell family applied legal pressure to compel him to complete three overdue monuments that he had contracted to create. This pattern of delays and professional failures suggests some kind of personal or professional breakdown.

== Monument works ==
Despite his difficulties, Cure completed several significant monuments. He finished the monument to Mary, Queen of Scots in Westminster Abbey, which had been begun by his father. Other documented works include monuments to Sir Roger Aston and his family (1611/12-1613) at Cranford, London, and three monuments for the Russell family, all at Chenies, Buckinghamshire: Francis, 2nd Earl of Bedford and his first wife (1617/18-c.1620), Francis, Lord Russell of Thornhaugh and his family (1617/18-c.1620), and Anne, Countess of Warwick (1617/18-c.1620). He also collaborated with Nicholas Johnson on a monument to James Montague, Bishop of Winchester (1618-19) at Bath Abbey.

== Personal life ==
Cure lived in the parish of St Thomas the Apostle, Southwark, where he is recorded from 1611/12 until his death. In 1624, he served as a parochial assessor for the poll tax. He was married with at least three children and died intestate in 1632. In December 1632, a grant of administration of his goods was made to his widow, Joanna, with their three minor children named in the documentation.

== Assessment ==
William Cure the Younger represents the decline of what had been a successful family workshop. Whilst he continued to work in the classical style developed by his father and grandfather, he did so with decreasing conviction and competence. His failures in the prestigious role of King's Master Mason, combined with his difficulties in completing private commissions on time, marked the end of the Cure family's prominence in English sculpture and masonry.

As historian Mark Girouard observed, the "interesting history of the first fifty years of the Cure workshop" established by William Cure the Elder and continued by Cornelius Cure had "petered out in the third generation" under William Cure the Younger's stewardship.

== Sources ==
- Girouard, Mark (2021). A Biographical Dictionary of English Architecture, 1540-1640. London: Paul Mellon centre for studies in British art. ISBN 978-1-913107-22-2. p.109.
- White, Adam, A Biographical Dictionary of London Tomb Sculptors c.1560-c.1660, The Volume of the Walpole Society, 61 (1999), pp.44-47.
