= John Russell, 1st Earl of Bedford =

English royal minister (c. 1485–1555)

The Right Honourable The Earl of Bedford KG PC JP
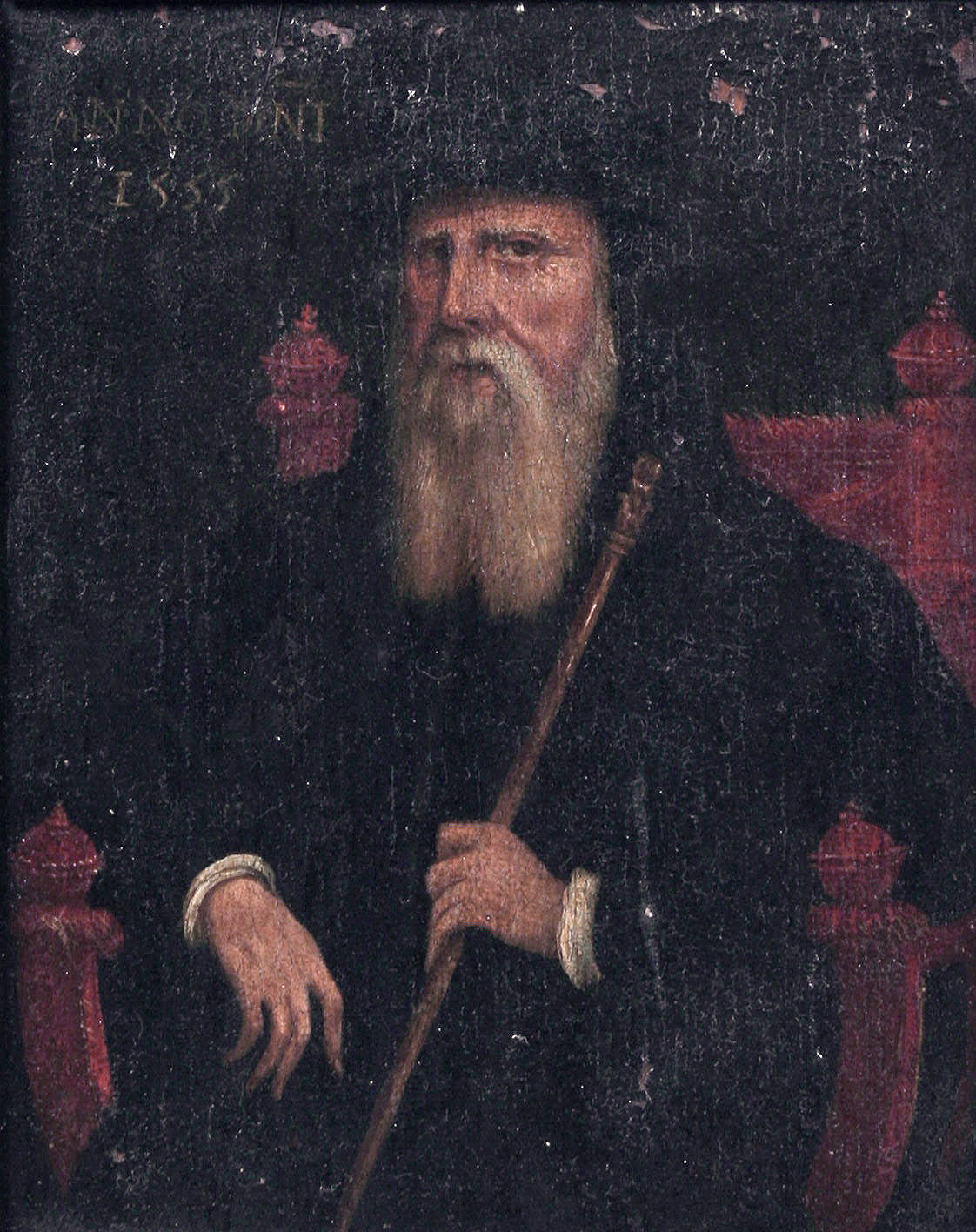
- John Russell, 1st Earl of Bedford, 1555

Lord High Steward for the coronation of Edward VI
- In office 20 February 1547 – 20 February 1547
- Monarch: Edward VI

Lord Privy Seal
- In office 1542–1555
- Monarchs: Henry VIII; Edward VI; Mary I
- Chancellor: See: Sir Thomas Audley (1542–1544); The Earl of Southampton (1544–1547); The Lord St. John (1547) (as Lord Keeper); The Lord Rich (1547–1551); Thomas Goodrich, Bishop of Ely (1551–1553); Stephen Gardiner, Bishop of Winchester (1553–1555)
- Preceded by: The Earl of Southampton
- Succeeded by: The Lord Paget

Lord High Admiral
- In office 1540–1542
- Monarch: Henry VIII
- Chancellor: Sir Thomas Audley
- Preceded by: The Earl of Southampton
- Succeeded by: The Earl of Hertford

Lord Lieutenant of Cornwall
- In office 1552–1554
- Monarchs: Edward VI; Mary I
- Preceded by: Unknown
- Succeeded by: The Earl of Bath

Lord Lieutenant of Devon
- In office 1552–1555
- Monarchs: Edward VI; Mary I
- Preceded by: Unknown
- Succeeded by: The Earl of Bath

Lord Lieutenant of Dorset
- In office 1552–1555
- Monarchs: Edward VI; Mary I
- Preceded by: Unknown
- Succeeded by: The Earl of Bath

Lord Lieutenant of Somerset
- In office 1552–1555
- Monarchs: Edward VI; Mary I
- Preceded by: Unknown
- Succeeded by: Vacant; The Earl of Pembroke

High Sheriff of Somerset and Dorset
- In office 1527–1527
- Monarch: Henry VIII
- Preceded by: John Seymour
- Succeeded by: Sir Andrew Luttrell

Member of Parliament for Buckinghamshire
- In office 9 August 1529 – 14 April 1536 Serving with Sir Andrew Windsor; Sir Francis Bryan (from 1532)
- Monarch: Henry VIII
- Chancellor: Sir Thomas More (1529–1532); Sir Thomas Audley (1532–1536)
- Preceded by: Unknown
- Succeeded by: Unknown

Personal details
- Born: John Russell c. 1485 Berwick-by-Swyre, Dorset
- Died: 14 May 1555 (aged 69–70)
- Resting place: Bedford Chapel, St Michael's Church, Chenies, Buckinghamshire
- Spouse: Anne Sapcote
- Relations: John Russell, 1st Earl Russell; Bertrand Russell; Winston Churchill (distant descendants)
- Children: Francis Russell, 2nd Earl of Bedford
- Parent(s): Sir James Russell (father); Alice Wyse (mother)
- Awards: Knight of the Order of the Garter; Privy Counsellor; Several life peerages
John Russell, 1st Earl of Bedford
- 1st Earl of Bedford
- Arms of Russell: Argent, a lion rampant gules on a chief sable three escallops of the first
- Tenure: 1550–1555
- Successor: Francis Russell, 2nd Earl of Bedford
- Other titles: 1st Baron Russell

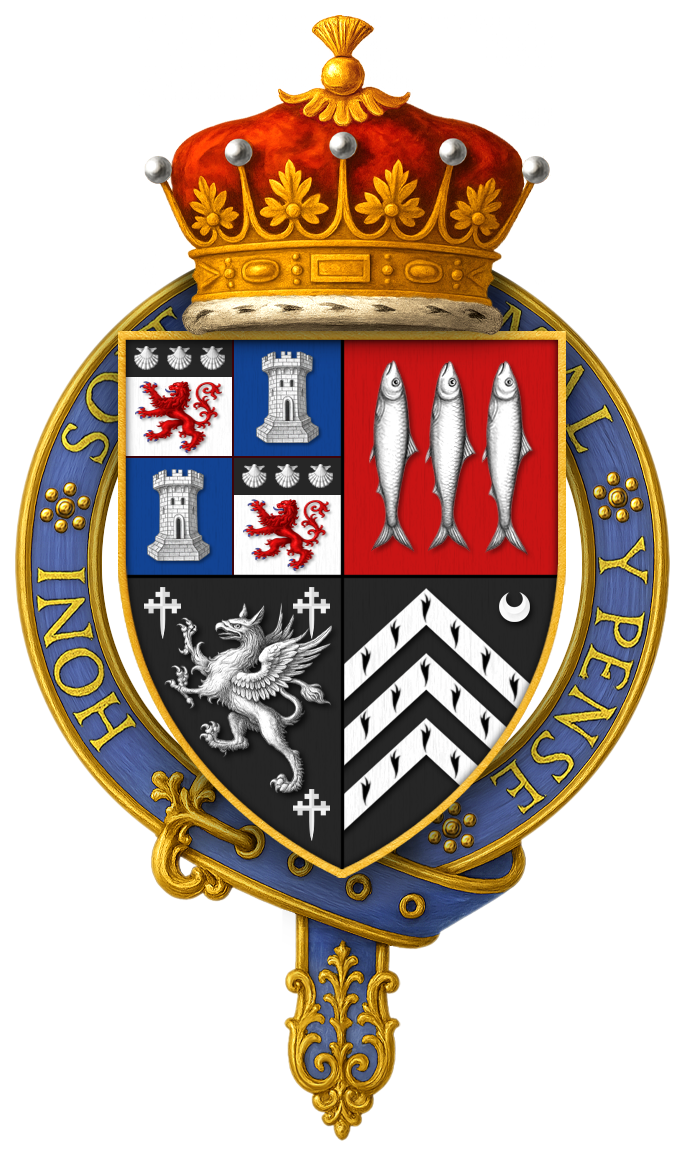
Quartered arms of John Russell, 1st Earl of Bedford as seen on his Garter stall plate. Quarterly of four: 1st grand quarter: Russell quartering Azure, a tower argent (de la Tour); 2: Gules, three herrings hauriant argent (Herringham); 3: Sable, a griffin segreant between three cross crosslets argent (Froxmere); 4: Sable, three chevronels ermine with a crescent for difference (Wyse)

John Russell, 1st Earl of Bedford, KG, PC, JP (c. 1485 – 14 March 1555) was an English royal minister in the Tudor era. He served variously as Lord High Admiral and Lord Privy Seal. Among the lands and property he was given by Henry VIII after the dissolution of the monasteries, were the Abbey and town of Tavistock, and the area that is now Covent Garden. Russell is the ancestor of all subsequent Earls and Dukes of Bedford and Earls Russell, including John Russell, Prime Minister of the United Kingdom (1865–6), and Bertrand Russell, the philosopher (1872–1970).

== Origins ==
John Russell was born c. 1485 probably at Berwick-by-Swyre, Dorset, the son of Sir James Russell (died November 1505) and his first wife Alice Wyse, daughter of Thomas Wyse of Sidenham, near Tavistock, Devon. James's father was possibly Sir William Russell, but more likely his brother John Russell (died before November, 1505) by his wife Alice Froxmere, daughter of John Froxmere of Droitwich, Worcestershire, because his coat of arms quarters Froxmere. The elder John Russell was the son of Sir Henry Russell (d. 1463/4), and Elizabeth Herring, daughter of John Herring of Chaldon Herring. Henry, a great-grandfather of the 1st earl, was a substantial wine merchant and shipper, who represented Weymouth in the House of Commons four times.

The Russell pedigree can only be traced back with certainty to Henry Russell's father, Sir Stephen Russell, the evidence being contained in a deed of April 1440 in which Henry Russell made over to his daughter Christina and her husband Walter Cheverell of Chauntemarle, a tenement in Dorchester to be held of himself and his heirs upon the rent of a red rose. In the deed, Henry referred to himself as "son and heir of Sir Stephen Russell and of Alice, his wife". This Alice appears to have been the heir general of the De la Tour family, which had long owned Berwick-by-Swyre, and by whom therefore the manor was brought into the Russell family.

Both Sir Henry and Sir Stephen were referred to as Gascoigne as well as Russell, possibly due to their wine trade with France (see Gascoigne), as in a 1442 pardon under the Privy Seal referring to "Henry Russell of Weymouth, merchant, alias Henry Gascoign, gentleman". It was long believed in the noble Russell family, certainly by the 2nd Earl of Bedford, that the family was descended from the ancient family of Russell of Kingston Russell in Dorset, three miles north-east of Berwick, which descent was declared unproven by Gladys Scott Thomson in her Two Centuries of Family History (London, 1930) an exhaustive and scholarly work on the early pedigree of the Earls of Bedford. (For a disambiguation of the Bedford Russells and the Russells of Kingston Russell, see Kingston Russell House.)

== Career ==
In 1506 John Russell was of service to Archduke Philip of Austria and Juana his wife (king and queen of Castile) when they were shipwrecked off Weymouth, and escorted the royal couple to the English court in London. He was one of the most accomplished gentlemen of his time and so impressed them by his gracious manners that they praised him highly to King Henry VII. He became a Gentleman of the Privy Chamber to Henry VII in 1507 and to his son and successor Henry VIII in 1509, who employed him in various military and diplomatic missions during the War of the League of Cambrai. He was at the taking of Thérouanne and Tournai. He was knighted on 2 July 1522 after losing an eye at the taking of Morlaix in Brittany, and he witnessed the Battle of Pavia.

Following his marriage in the Spring of 1526, he made alterations to his ancestral seat Chenies Manor House to reflect his new good fortunes. He now stood in favour with the king and Cardinal Wolsey, though he would not suffer disgrace at the fall of the latter.

He was made High Sheriff of Dorset and Somerset in 1528 and served as Member of Parliament for Buckinghamshire 1529–1536, retaining the royal favour despite the antipathy of Anne Boleyn. Late in 1536, he was made a Privy Counsellor, and helped to suppress the Pilgrimage of Grace.

The fall and execution of Henry Courtenay, Marquess of Exeter, left a power vacuum in the south-western counties of England, which Russell was called upon to fill. On 9 March 1538/1539 he was created Baron Russell, and appointed Lord President of the Council of the West. In the next month, he was made a Knight of the Garter. In July 1539 he was made High Steward of Cornwall, and Lord Warden of the Stannaries.

The Council of the West proved unsuccessful as an instrument of government, and did not survive the fall of Cromwell. Russell, however, remained a great magnate in the western counties, and obtained the office of Lord High Admiral in 1540. (The previous holder, the Earl of Southampton, replaced Cromwell as Lord Privy Seal.) After Henry VIII met Anne of Cleves at Rochester, the next day he asked Russell if he "thought her fair". Russell replied with his natural diplomacy and prudence that he took her "not to be fair, but of a brown complexion". In 1542, Russell himself resigned from the Admiralty and succeeded to the Privy Seal on the death of Southampton. He was High Steward of the University of Oxford from 1543 till his death.

During the Italian War of 1542, he unsuccessfully besieged Montreuil in 1544, and was Captain General of the Vanguard of the army for the attack on Boulogne in 1545. He was a close companion of King Henry VIII during the last years of his reign. On Henry's death in 1547, he was one of the executors of the king's will, and one of sixteen counsellors during the minority of his son King Edward VI.

On 21 June 1553 he was one of the twenty-six peers who signed the settlement of the crown on Lady Jane Grey. He was sent to attend King Philip II into England on his arrival from Spain to wed the Queen Mary.

== Earldom ==
He was Lord High Steward at the Coronation of King Edward VI (1547–1553) on 20 February 1547. He was created by that young king (in practice by the Regent) Earl of Bedford on 19 January 1550 for his assistance in carrying out the order of the Council against "images" and for promoting the new religion. In 1552, he was made Lord Lieutenant of Devon.

== Marriage and progeny ==
In the spring of 1526 he married Anne Sapcote, daughter of Sir Guy Sapcote of Huntingdonshire by his wife Margaret Wolston, and widow, successively, of John Broughton (d. 24 January 1518) of Toddington, Bedfordshire, by whom she had a son and three daughters, and, secondly, of Sir Richard Jerningham (d.1525), by whom she had no issue. By Anne Sapcote he had one child:

- Francis Russell, 2nd Earl of Bedford (1527–1585), son and heir

=== Step-children ===
The issue of Anne Sapcote by her first husband John Broughton (d. 1518) were as follows:

- John Broughton (d. 1528).
- Katherine Broughton (d. 23 April 1533), who was the ward firstly of Cardinal Wolsey, and secondly Agnes Howard, Duchess of Norfolk, who arranged the marriage of Katherine, as his first wife, to her eldest son, William Howard, 1st Baron Howard of Effingham.
- Anne Broughton (d. 16 May 1562), who married, as his second wife, by dispensation dated 24 May 1539, Sir Thomas Cheyney, Lord Warden of the Cinque Ports. There is a monument to her at Toddington.
- Daughter whose name is unknown, and who died between July 1517 and 1529.

== Death and burial ==
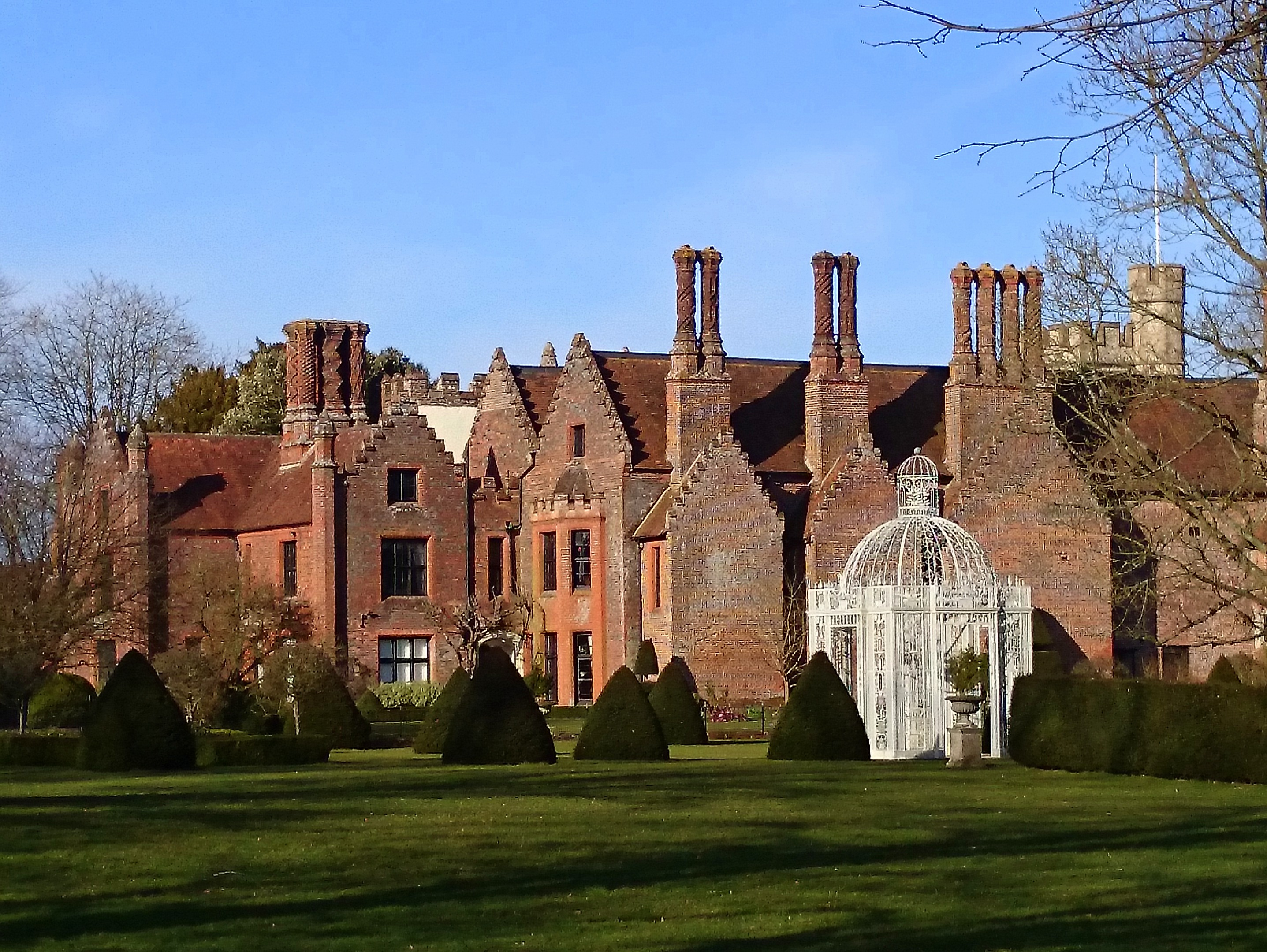
Chenies Manor

Russell died on 14 March 1554/5 and was buried at his ancestral manor of Chenies, Buckinghamshire, in the private Bedford Chapel of the parish church next to Chenies Manor House, his former chief residence. The Dukes of Bedford continue to be buried in this chapel.

His widow, Anne, died on 14 March 1559 and was buried at Chenies on 21 March 1559.

== Succession ==
Russell is the ancestor of all subsequent Earls and Dukes of Bedford and Earls Russell, including John Russell, Prime Minister of the United Kingdom, and the philosopher Bertrand Russell.

== Properties acquired ==
On the dissolution of the monasteries King Henry VIII granted Russell lands and properties including Tavistock Abbey and Plympton Abbey in Devon, the wealthiest two abbeys in Devon, and the Cistercian Dunkeswell Abbey also in Devon. He was granted the Blackfriars in Exeter, on the site of which he built his opulent townhouse known as Bedford House, from where he conducted his duties as Lord Lieutenant of Devon. These grants made him the largest landowner in Devon. In Bedfordshire, he acquired the site of Woburn Abbey which he made his chief seat. In London he was granted seven acres (28,000 m^{2}) called "Long Acre", and the kitchen garden of Westminster Abbey, which is now the site of Covent Garden. The present Duke of Bedford (or his trustees, the "Bedford trustees") retain still in 2013 several acres of prime London property comprising the Bedford Estate centred on Bedford Square and Tavistock Square.

== Garter stall plate ==
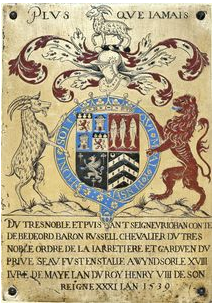
Garter stall plate of John Russell, 1st Earl of Bedford, installed as a Knight of the Garter 18 May 1539

John Russell's Garter stall plate survives affixed to the back of his stall in St George's Chapel, Windsor Castle. The shield shows quarterly of four: 1st grand quarter: quarterly 1st & 4th: Argent, a lion rampant gules on a chief sable three escallops of the first (Russell); 2nd & 3rd: Azure, a tower argent (de la Tour); 2nd Gules, three herrings hauriant argent (Herringham); 3rd Sable, a griffin segreant between three crosses crosslet fitchy argent (Froxmere); 4th: Sable, three chevronnels ermine in dexter chief a crescent or for difference (Wyse). Crest: A goat passant argent; Supporters: Dexter: A goat argent, Sinister: A lion rampant gules Motto: Plus que Jamais ("More than Never"). Inscription in French: Du tres noble et puisant Seigneur Johan Conte de Bedford Baron Russell Chevalier du tres noble Ordre de la Jarretiere et Garduen du Prive Seau, fust enstalle a Wyndsor le XVIII jure de Maye l'an du Roy Henry VIII de son reigne XXXI l'an 1539 ("Of the very noble and powerful Lord John, Earl of Bedford, Baron Russell, Knight of the Very Noble Order of the Garter and Keeper of the Privy Seal was installed at Windsor the 18th day of May the year of King Henry VIII of his reign the 31st, the year 1539").

== Footnotes ==
Political offices
Preceded by William FitzWilliam	Lord High Admiral; 1540–1542	Succeeded by Edward Seymour
Preceded by William FitzWilliam	Lord Privy Seal; 1542–1555	Succeeded by William Paget
Preceded by Sir William Paulet	Comptroller of the Household; 1537–1539	Succeeded by Sir William Kingston
Preceded by Unknown	Lord Lieutenant of Cornwall; 1552–1554	Succeeded by The Earl of Bath
Preceded by Unknown	Lord Lieutenant of Devon and Dorset; 1552–1555	Succeeded by The Earl of Bath
Preceded by Unknown	Lord Lieutenant of Somerset; 1552–1555	Unknown
Court offices
Preceded by The Marquess of Exeter	Lord Warden of the Stannaries; 1539–1555	Succeeded by The Earl of Bedford
Peerage of England
New title	Earl of Bedford; 1551–1555	Succeeded by Francis Russell
New title	Baron Russell (descended by acceleration); 1539–1553	Succeeded by Francis Russell
