= Samuel Austin Allibone =

19th-century American author

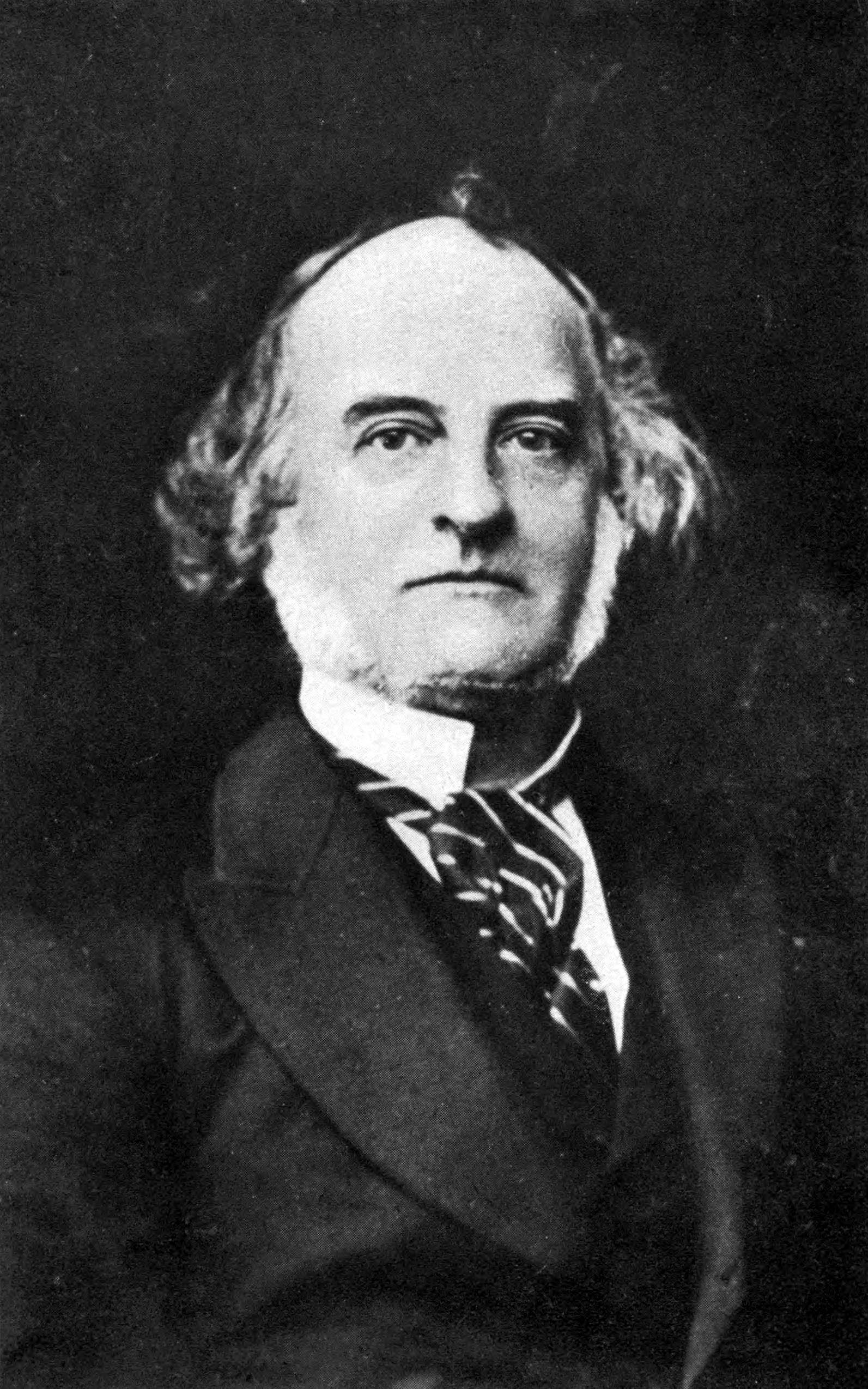
- Allibone in 1876
- Born: April 17, 1816; Philadelphia, Pennsylvania
- Died: September 2, 1889 (aged 73); Lucerne, Switzerland

Signature
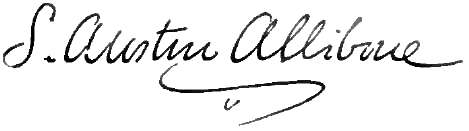

Samuel Austin Allibone (April 17, 1816 – September 2, 1889) was an American author, editor, and bibliographer.

== Biography ==
Samuel Austin Allibone was born in 1816 in Philadelphia, Pennsylvania, and was a descendant of French Huguenots and Quakers. He received a private education in Philadelphia. For many years, he attempted to establish himself as a merchant, but his efforts met with little success. He eventually abandoned business to pursue his passion for books, developing an extensive knowledge of English literature through wide reading and bibliographical research.

In 1865, he was elected as a member to the American Philosophical Society.

His most significant work is A Critical Dictionary of English Literature and British and American Authors. Allibone registered his copyright for the work in 1854. (Note: Entered, according to an act of Congress, in the year 1854, by S. AUSTIN ALLIBONE, in the clerk's office of the District Court of the United States, in and for the Eastern District of Pennsylvania.) As it happened, George William Childs of the publishing firm Childs & Peterson maintained offices at 602 Arch Street in Philadelphia, just a short walk from Allibone’s residence in the 900 block of Arch Street. In 1855, Childs printed a specimen of Allibone’s book for reviewers. This preview presented entries only for the first three letters.

Not until 1858 did Childs & Peterson register its successor copyright (Note: Entered, according to an act of Congress, in the year 1858, by GEORGE W. CHILDS, in the clerk's office of the District Court of the United States in and for the Eastern District of Pennsylvania.) and publish the first volume of Allibone’s Critical Dictionary, containing entries from A through J. In 1859, the Critical Dictionary was jointly published with the London firm of N. Trübner & Co., but the book was printed by Deacon & Peterson in Philadelphia.

The firm of Childs & Peterson dissolved in 1860, and Childs then joined with the Philadelphia publisher Joshua Lippincott for several months. In 1861 he re-established himself as a publisher under his own name, and the next sighting of the Critical Dictionary is Childs's 1863 reprint of the first Childs & Peterson edition of 1858. However, Childs retired from the book trade that year, and in 1864 he purchased the Public Ledger, a Philadelphia newspaper. Facilitated by Childs's friendship with both Allibone and Lippincott, the copyright in the Critical Dictionary passed to Joshua B. Lippincott in 1870. (Note: Entered, according to an act of Congress, in the year 1870, by J. B. LIPPINCOTT & CO., in the Clerk's Office of the District Court of the United States in and for the Eastern District of Pennsylvania.)

In quick succession the whole of Allibone’s Critical Dictionary then appeared: volume 1 in 1870, expanded to encompass A through L; also in 1870 volume 2 for M through S; and finally volume 3 in 1871, with the “forty indexes of subjects” that had been promised on the title page of each printing since 1858. Childs would later recall that he and Lippincott had together invested more than $60,000 to publish the three large volumes of Allibone's Critical Dictionary, which, according to McConnell, included generous support for Allibone in his labors.

The first volume of Lippincott’s edition retained Allibone’s dedication to George William Childs, but substituted “The Original Publisher of this Volume” for “The Publisher of this Work”. Volumes 2 and 3 he dedicated to his “friend Joshua B. Lippincott, whose enterprise enables me to give to the world the completion of this work”.

The title page of volume 1 in 1858 had promised 30 thousand articles. This promise expanded to more than 43 thousand in the first and second volumes of the Lippincott edition. The title page of the third volume in 1871 claimed more than 46 thousand articles. (Note: A final bibliographical note: the title of Allibone’s work as published by Childs was A Critical Dictionary of English Literature, and British and American Authors, that is, with a comma following Literature.)

Soon after the third volume appeared, a reviewer in the Catholic World accused Allibone, a staunch Episcopalian, of bias against Catholic writers, especially in relation to literature about Mary, Queen of Scots.

A two-volume supplement was prepared by John Foster Kirk for J. B. Lippincott. The first volume, A through G, appeared in 1891 and the second, H through Z, in 1892.

From 1867 to 1873 and again from 1877 to 1879, Allibone was book editor and corresponding secretary of the American Sunday School Union. From 1879 to 1888 he was librarian of the Lenox Library in New York City; he resigned due to failing health. He died at Lucerne, Switzerland, in 1889. In addition to his Critical Dictionary he published three large anthologies and several religious tracts. He contributed to the North American Review, the Evangelical Review and other periodicals. Allibone also prepared the indexes for Edward Everett's Orations and Speeches (1850–1859), and for Washington Irving's Life and Letters (1861–1864).

Samuel Allibone's brother was Thomas Allibone (1809–1876), senior member of the family's shipping concern, Thomas Allibone & Co. Thomas Allibone was president of the large Bank of Pennsylvania at the time of its collapse in September 1857.

== Works ==
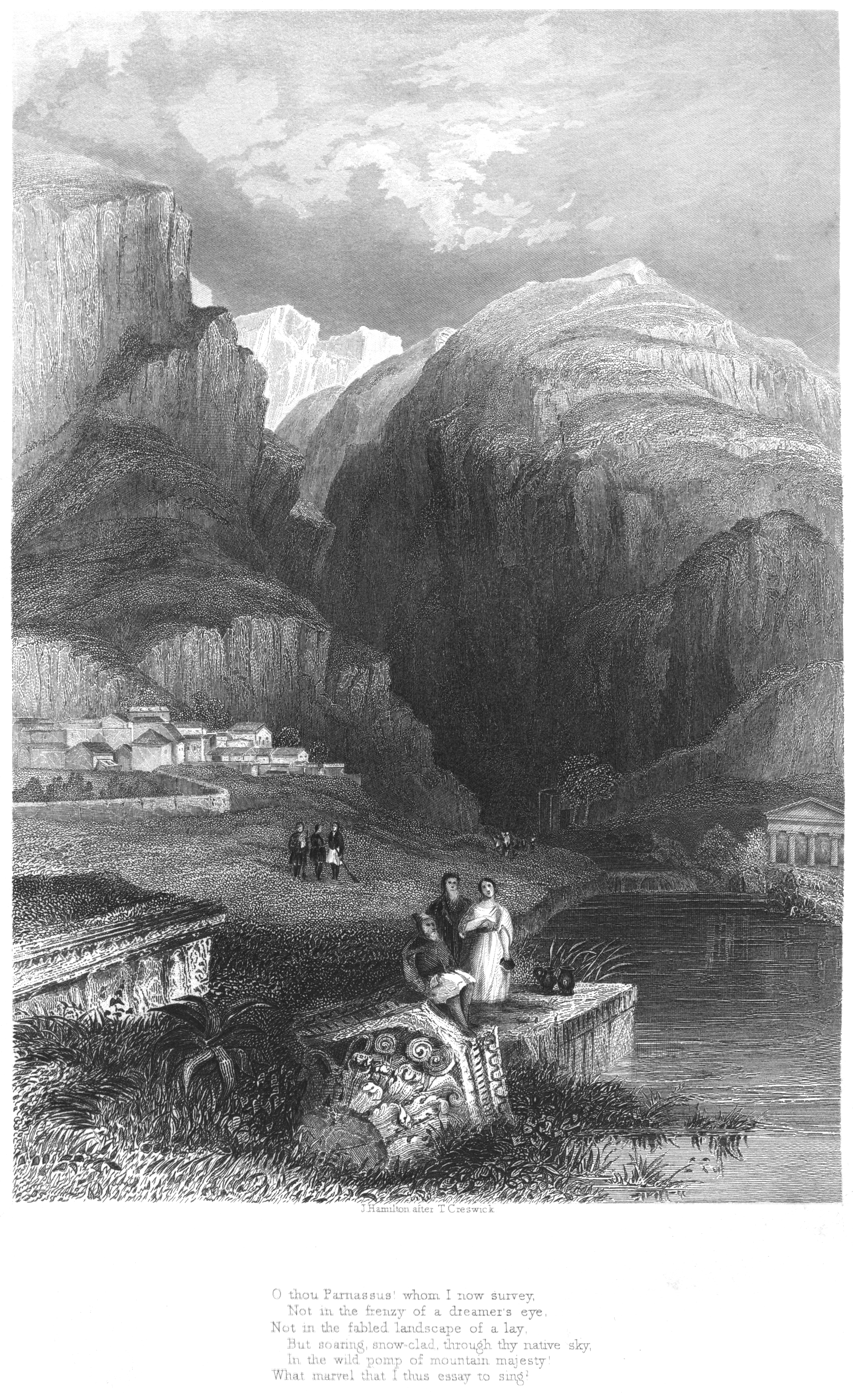
Frontispiece from the 1876 illustrated edition of Poetical Quotations.

- A Review, by a Layman, of a Work entitled, "New Themes for the Protestant Clergy". Philadelphia: Lippincott, Grambo, & Co. 1852.
- New Themes Condemned: or, Thirty Opinions upon "New Themes," and its "Reviewer.". Philadelphia: Lippincott, Grambo & Co. 1853.
- Alphabetical Index to the New Testament. Philadelphia: American Sunday-School Union. 1868.
- Explanatory Questions on the Gospels and the Acts. 1869. Although widely attributed to Allibone, no trace of this tract is now evident. It was probably published by the American Sunday-School Union.
- A Critical Dictionary of English Literature and British and American Authors. Philadelphia: J. B. Lippincott & Co. 1870–71.
- Evidences of the Divine Origin of the Holy Scriptures. Philadelphia: American Sunday-School Union. 1871.
- Poetical Quotations from Chaucer to Tennyson. Philadelphia: J. B. Lippincott & Co. 1873. The title page brags: "With copious indexes: authors, 550; subjects, 435; quotations, 13,600." Lippincott also issued Poetical Quotations in a fancy edition with a frontis piece and a different title page, which advertised that the book is "illustrated with twenty steel engravings."
- Prose Quotations from Socrates to Macaulay. Philadelphia: J. B. Lippincott & Co. 1876. The title page brags: "With indexes: authors, 544; subjects, 571; quotations, 8810."
- Great Authors of All Ages. Philadelphia: J. B. Lippincott & Co. 1880.
