= St Michael's, Chenies =

Church in Chenies, Buckinghamshire, England

Coordinates: 51°40′29″N 0°31′57″W

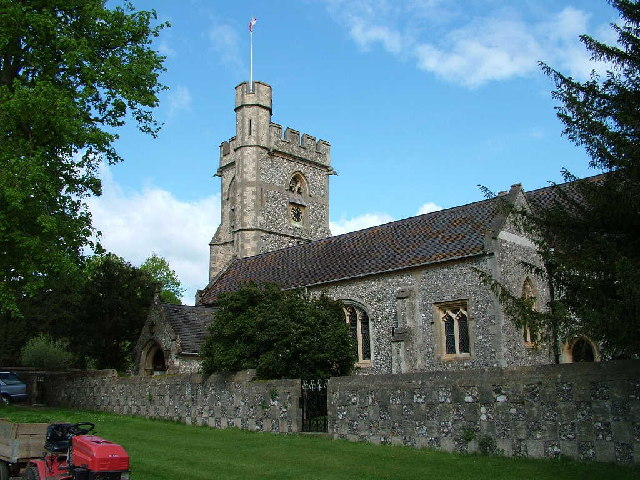
St Michael's Church at Chenies, viewed from the East

St Michael's Church at Chenies, Buckinghamshire, is a Grade I listed Anglican parish church in the Diocese of Oxford in England. It is not of great architectural interest but stands in an attractive position in the Chess Valley near the Chenies Manor House. The church is famous for its Bedford Chapel (photo), the mausoleum of the Russell family (Dukes of Bedford of Woburn Abbey) which is private and not open to the public.

== Parish church ==
=== History ===
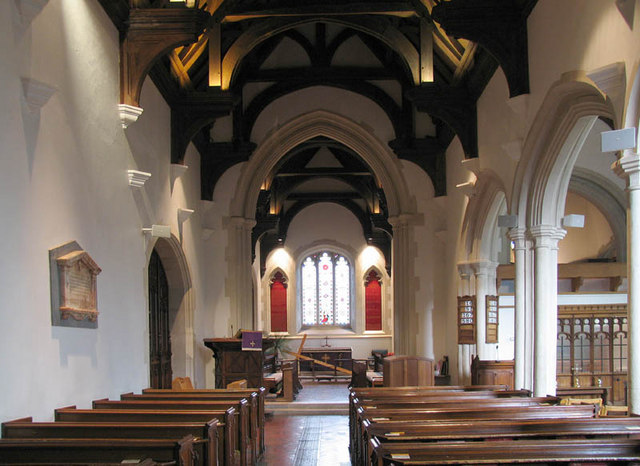
Interior of St Michael's

The present parish church mainly dates from the late 15th and early 16th centuries, replacing an earlier, mainly wooden church dating from the 12th century. The first church on this site and dedicated to St. Michael is believed to have been built in the latter part of the 12th century by Alexander de Isenhampstead. "Isenhampstead" was the original name of the village that later came to be known as "Isenhampstead Chenies" and by the 19th century simply as "Chenies".

In 1556 the Russell family (later Dukes of Bedford) added the Bedford Chapel, which was subsequently rebuilt and enlarged. After the church had fallen into disrepair during the 18th century, a major period of repairs and amendments was begun in 1829 by Lord Wriothesley Russell, Rector of Chenies for 57 years. This involved the closure of the church for part of the 1830s, during which time his father, the 6th Duke of Bedford, allowed the Long Room in the Chenies Manor House to be used for services. After St Michael's had been restored and repaired, it was reopened for public worship on 23 June 1836.

Another great renovation was carried out on St. Michael's in the period 1861–1887, during which the church was substantially rebuilt. In 1885 the Bedford Chapel was extended westwards towards the tower, in 1886-1887 the roof was raised and the present day hammer beam roof installed. In 1906 the Bedford Chapel was further extended. The belfry chamber was installed in 1933. Prior to that date the ringers were to be seen at the base of the tower on the same level as the nave. Electric light was installed for the first time in 1936. In 1959-1960 the organ was destroyed by storm damage and was replaced in 1960 by the present organ. The new organ console was placed at the south east corner of the nave where it still stands.

=== Description ===
The chancel, nave, south aisle and west tower date from the 15th century, while the north chapel (Bedford Chapel) was added in 1556. Most of the masonry is of flint rubble with stone dressings. The west tower features a stair turret in the south-east. The exterior walls had their flint facing reworked in the 1860s. Inside the church, there are many items of interest. At the north side of the church, an arch leads from the nave into the Bedford Chapel. There is a 12th-century 'Aylesbury' style font from the Norman period, also medieval brasses, and Victorian windows.

== Bedford Chapel ==
=== Description ===
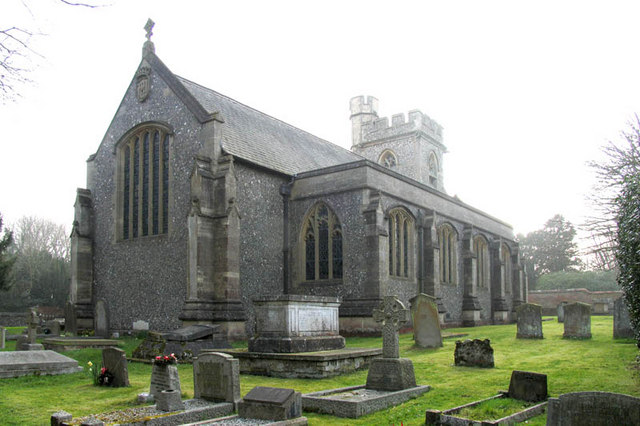
The exterior of St Michael's, with the Bedford Chapel attached

The Bedford Chapel (see photo and floor plan) is the private mausoleum of the Russell family, Dukes of Bedford. Although it is within the curtilage of St. Michael's Church, it is administrated from Woburn Abbey. It is not open to the public, though visible through the glazed screen in the church. The chapel contains what Nikolaus Pevsner described as "as rich a store of funeral monuments as any parish church of England".

The Bedford Chapel is attached to the north side of St Michael's Church and was commissioned in 1556 by Anne Sapcote († 1559), widow of John Russell, 1st Earl of Bedford, in accordance with her husband's will. An inscribed stone tablet is built into the outer face of the east wall of the chapel, below the window, and records: "Anno Dni 1556 / Thys Chappel ys, built by Anne / Countysse of Bedforde wyfe to / John Erle of Bedford accordyg to / ye last wyll of the sayd erle." Monuments in the Bedford Chapel range from one from the 15th century through elaborate 17th-century sculpture to one to the 9th Duke of Bedford († 1891). The Russell standard and banners hang from the walls and ten funeral hatchments are fixed to the roof. Throughout the chapel, all recumbent figures have their feet turned away from the East. Several coronets are fixed at cornice level on the South wall.

The floor of the Bedford Chapel is of black and white marble. There is an open wood roof with hammer beams, the ends of the corbels decorated with half figures of angels bearing coloured shields of the Russell and associated families. The series of six stained-glass windows on the north side is by C.E. Kempe, circa 1897. On the floor of the chancel is the helm and sword which hung over the stall of 7th Duke of Bedford in St George's Chapel, Windsor Castle as a Knight of the Garter. The large East window is dedicated to the 9th Duke of Bedford and his wife Elizabeth, as is a carved stone achievement on the outer face of the West gable wall. The 9th Duke and his wife were early supporters of cremation and paid for the construction of Woking Crematorium. Their ashes are buried in the Bedford Chapel, as are those of Herbrand Russell, 11th Duke of Bedford, who served as president of the Cremation Society of Great Britain from 1921 to his death in 1940.

In 1868, a new parish church was completed near Woburn Abbey in Woburn, Bedfordshire, under the 8th Duke of Bedford. It was equipped with a crypt beneath, which was originally intended as the burial place of the Dukes of Bedford and their family. In the end the Russell family continued to use the ancient mausoleum at Chenies, and the crypt of St. Mary's parish church in Woburn is now used for events and meetings. The hatch through which coffins would have been lowered into the crypt is still visible.

Lady Amberley, the wife of Viscount Amberley, eldest son of the 1st Earl Russell, died in 1874 of diphtheria caught from her daughter Rachel, who died five days later. Their deaths greatly affected Viscount Amberley, whose decision to have their bodies cremated without religious ceremony shocked English society. Lady Amberley's ashes were originally deposited in the grounds of their Wye Valley home along with those of her daughter. All three sets of remains were eventually moved to the Bedford Chapel shortly after Lord Amberley's own death in 1876.

=== Monuments ===
Arms of the Russell family, Earls and Dukes of Bedford

The Bedford Chapel is famous for its collection of monuments to the Earls and Dukes of Bedford from the Russell family, most of whom are buried in the vault beneath the chapel. The monuments of the highest quality and importance are:

- Monument to John Russell, 1st Earl of Bedford († 1555) and wife Anne Sapcote († 1559); a tomb chest with effigies.

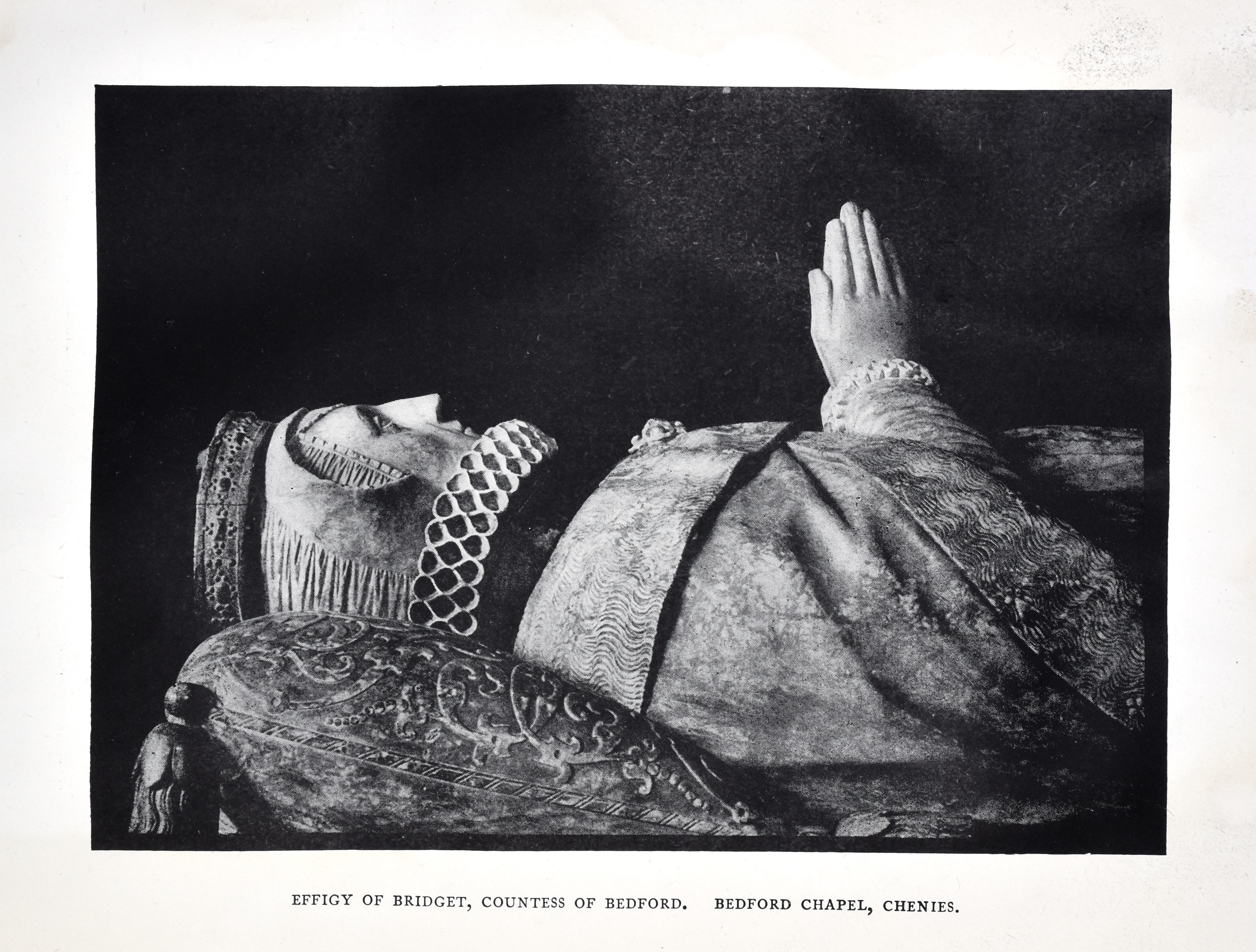
Monument to Bridget, Countess of Bedford, from Fryer (1916)

- Monument to Bridget Hussey († 1600), daughter of John Hussey, 1st Baron Hussey of Sleaford, widow of Sir Richard Morison and the 2nd Earl of Bedford and patron of St. Mary's Church, Watford, where she founded a chapel in 1595. Her table tomb with effigy originally stood in the church at Watford and was removed to the Bedford Chapel at Chenies in 1907.
- Monument to Anne Russell, Countess of Warwick († 1604); a tomb chest and effigy by William Cure the Younger.
- Monument to Elizabeth Russell, Lady Russell of Thornhaugh († 1611); a tomb chest and effigy. Also removed from Watford in 1907.
- Monument to Lady Frances Bourchier († 1612), unmarried daughter of William Bourchier, 3rd Earl of Bath. She died aged 25. Her monument stands in the centre of the chapel, opposite the entrance in the south side. It consists of a plain slab of black marble supported by four white marble Doric columns which forms a canopy to a second slab of black marble, under which is a step of black marble on the floor. Two heraldic lozenges exist on the lower slab each surmounted by an Earl's coronet, sculpted in relief in white marble. An inscription records the erection of the monument by Anne Clifford, Countess of Dorset (1590-1676) "her deare cosen", daughter of Lady Margaret Russell and therefore her first cousin, and she is mentioned several times in Anne's diaries which survive.
- Monument to Francis Russell, 2nd Earl of Bedford († 1619); a tomb chest with effigies by William Cure the Younger.
- Monument to Lady Frances Clinton († 1623), daughter of Edward Clinton, 1st Earl of Lincoln and wife of the 3rd Lord Chandos, mother-in-law of the 4th Earl of Bedford; a semi-reclining figure on base.
- Monument to Francis Russell, 4th Earl of Bedford († 1641) and his wife Catherine Brydges († 1657); a tomb chest with effigies of alabaster, back wall with 2 arches and big open pediment by William Cure the Younger.
- Monument to William Russell, 1st Duke of Bedford († 1700); marble pairs of Corinthian columns with oval portrait medallions between 2 life-size seated figures and baldacchino above.
- Monument to Wriothesley Russell, 2nd Duke of Bedford († 1711) and his wife Elizabeth Howland. The monument was made 1769 by Joseph Wilton to designs by Sir William Chambers. White alabaster, youth and maiden separated by clouds, putti cover.
- Memorial to Lady Georgiana Russell († 1858), by Richard Westmacott. Gothic arch with knobbly foliage, praying lady in profile.
- Monument to John Russell, 1st Earl Russell († 1878)
- Monument to Odo Russell, 1st Baron Ampthill († 1884) by Sir Joseph Edgar Boehm.
- Monument to Francis Russell, 9th Duke of Bedford († 1891), by G E Fox in Jacobean style.
- Memorial to Lord Arthur Russell († 1892), buried in Brompton Cemetery, London. The memorial in the Bedford Chapel is by Alfred Gilbert in Art Nouveau style.
- A 14th century monument to a member of the Cheyne family (medieval lords of the manor of Chenies) and his wife. Table tomb with effigies, of which the male was never completed.

== Churchyard ==
St.Michael's Church is surrounded by the parish cemetery. The Churchyard Extension contains the war grave of an airman of World War II, Aircraftsman 2nd Class John Lionel Crook, who died on 12 December 1944.
