= Chenies Manor House =

Historic building in Buckinghamshire, England

Coordinates: 51.674428°N 0.532966°W

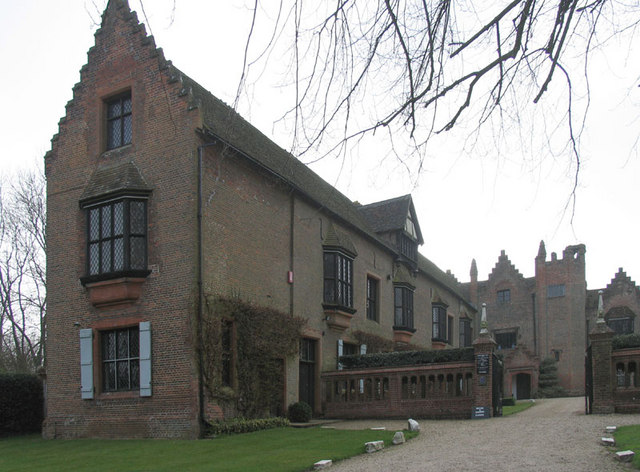
- Chenies Manor House
- Alternative names: Chenies Palace

General information
- Type: Country house
- Architectural style: Tudor
- Location: Chenies, Buckinghamshire, England
- Construction started: 1460
- Client: Sir John Cheyne

Chenies Manor House in the parish of Chenies in Buckinghamshire, England, is a Tudor Grade I listed building once known as Chenies Palace, although it was never a royal seat or the seat of a bishop. It was held by the Cheney family from 1180 and passed by marriage successively to the Semark and Sapcote families and then, in 1526, to the Russell family, Earls of Bedford, later Dukes of Bedford, by whom it was held for several centuries. Although the Russell family soon abandoned Chenies as its main seat in favour of Woburn Abbey in Bedfordshire, Chenies parish church remains the site of the private "Bedford Chapel", the mausoleum still in use by that family.

John Russell, 1st Earl of Bedford set about improving the house both as his home and enlarging it to the size and standard needed to house the royal court, so he could host visits from the king. The house was probably constructed by him around 1530–1550, while the significantly larger north range, which included the royal apartments, has been demolished. Russell had a meteoric career as an adviser to successive monarchs, becoming wealthy and titled and acquiring other properties. By about 1608 Woburn Abbey had become the principal family residence. Thereafter, Chenies became increasingly neglected; the surviving buildings were the ones which were still considered practical.

At the northern end of the west wing, there is an undercroft from the previous medieval manor house which occupied the same site, which is a scheduled ancient monument (SM 27145).

== History of the house ==
The buildings are situated at a high point in the local landscape, 400 yards (370 m) south of the River Chess, which forms the boundary between Buckinghamshire and Hertfordshire. The general area shows evidence of occupation in Roman times, including a villa found to the north east of the church, which was occupied between the 1st and 4th centuries AD. A house on this site is recorded to have existed in 1165, when the locality was known as Isenhampstead. There is no specific mention of the settlement in the Domesday Book of 1086, but it is thought to have then formed part of the Manor of Chesham. The church of St Michael stands directly to the east of the current manor and has parts dating back to the 12th century, although it was extensively reconstructed at later times. A watermill also stood, on the nearby river, in the 12th century.

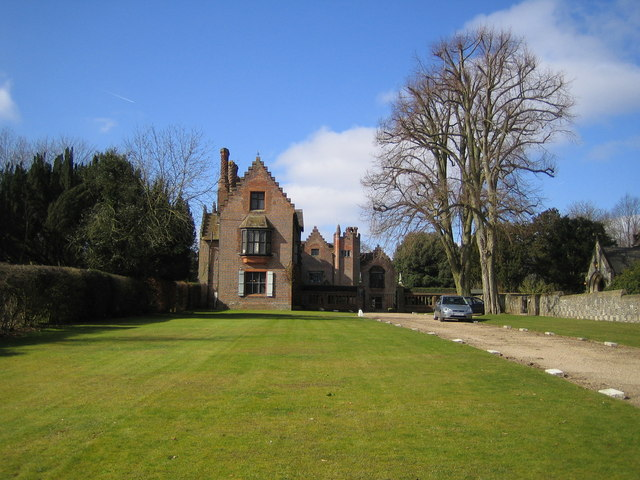
Chenies Manor House, showing the modern driveway approach from the east.

The first recorded Cheyne to own the property was Alexander Cheyne. It passed to his son John, who was sheriff of Buckinghamshire and Bedfordshire in 1278, and who was granted a knighthood. On his death in 1285 it was given to Edward I in payment of debts, when it was valued at £11 4s 3d. John's widow continued to draw a pension from the estate, and it was returned to Bartholemew Cheyne in 1296. There are records that the king stayed at Isenhampstead in 1290, which suggest a substantial house existed at that time.

The estate was referred to as Isenhampsted Chenies in 1321, distinguishing it from Isenhampstead Latimer. By that time it had passed to Bartholemew's son Alexander, and then by 1350 to his son Sir John Cheyne, who was also sheriff of Buckinghamshire and Bedfordshire. Sir John was sentenced to death in 1397, commuted to life imprisonment, for being a Lollard. His successor, John Cheyne, was a member of parliament in 1413 and 1425, and also served two terms as sheriff. The estate was then transferred by John and his son Alexander to another relative, Thomas Cheyne and from there passed to Thomas' brother John Cheyne, Lord of Drayton Beauchamp. On his death the property remained with his widow as they had no children, and although she remarried was left in 1500 to her niece Anne Philip. On Anne's death in 1510 the property was left to her grand daughter Anne Sapcote. She married John Broughton, but after his death in 1518 she married again in 1526 to John Russell, 1st Earl of Bedford, and thus the property entered the second significant family in its history.

John Cheyne's widow, Lady Agnes Cheyne, left the manor house in a contested will to her niece, Anne Semark, wife of Sir David Phelip, in 1494. It is believed Chenies passed to the Semark family of Thornhaugh, Northamptonshire, to re-promote the family at court. The Sapcote family was on the losing side with Richard at the Battle of Bosworth Field in 1485, where Henry VII claimed the throne for the House of Tudor. Phelip married Ann Semark after Bosworth, Phelip had a close friendship with the Cecils of Burghley, the Cecils and Semark were kin.

=== Russell family ===
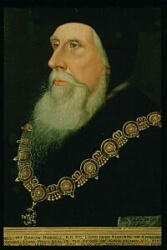
John Russell, first Earl of Bedford

John Russell was a rising man in Tudor England, who from a modest gentry background created a dynasty by being a loyal servant to Henry VII, Henry VIII, and Edward VI, for which he was well rewarded. He fought in wars, was knighted, joined the royal household and became a gentleman of the privy chamber to both Henry VII and Henry VIII, became a diplomat responsible for secret negotiations, member of parliament, privy councillor, Lord High Admiral, in 1539 Baron Russell of Chenies, Keeper of the Privy Seal, and one of the executors of Henry VIII's will. In 1550 he was created Earl of Bedford during the regency for Edward VI, and was reappointed Lord Privy Seal by Queen Mary after Edward's death. On the occasion of his marriage to Anne and acquisition of Chenies, the king gave him a wedding present of the neighbouring Manor of Amersham. At that time, the income from three manors which were the property of his new wife, Chenies, Thornaugh and Covington was £70 per annum, while Amersham was valued at £43 per annum (at this time, the crown typically granted lands to new landholders for a fee of twenty times their annual income). Part of the Chenies lands were enfeoffed, transferred to a new landholder in exchange for taking on feudal obligations which came with the manor. Russell made improvements to the house, and was probably responsible for the south wing.

Henry VIII is known to have visited the manor several times, with a court and retinue which might amount to 1000 persons. In 1534 he attended together with Anne Boleyn and Princess Elizabeth, and was probably there at the time of the execution of Sir Thomas More. In 1541 he visited with Katherine Howard, and the house was mentioned in evidence against her as somewhere she had committed adultery with Thomas Culpepper. Sir John Leland visited the house in 1544 and wrote:

"The old house of Cheynies is so translated by my Lord Russell that little or nothing of it in a manner remaineth untranslated: and a great deal of the house has been newly set up made of brick and timber: and fair lodgings be new erected in the garden. The house is within diverse places richly painted with antique works of white and Black. And there be about the House two Parkes as I remember. The Manor Place standeth at the West Ende of the Parishe Churche. In the Parishe Churche on the North side of it, as in a Chapelle, be two Tumbes of the Cheynies Lords of the Manor and the small village bearing their name".(Leland’s Itinerary, fol 122)

One of the deer parks is described in a lease made in 1571 as covering 484 acres. John Russell died in 1555 and was succeeded by his only son Francis Russell, 2nd Earl of Bedford. Francis had been part of the attempt to place Lady Jane Grey on the English throne instead of the catholic Mary, and as a result had been imprisoned and then exiled. He took part in the Battle of St. Quentin (1557), which involved Spanish and French forces, and had recovered some royal favour by the end of Mary's reign. On the accession of Queen Elizabeth I he became a Privy Councillor and became a trusted member of the government as his father had been. In 1560 the house was restyled by Francis, who had made it his principal home. Queen Elizabeth visited the house in July 1570 and stayed for four weeks. Records exist of a survey of the house listing repairs and alterations in preparation for the visit, including 18 square feet of glass for the Queen's rooms.

Francis died in 1585 with significant debts. An inventory of Chenies was drawn up for the purposes of a sale of household goods and reveals many details about the house: It had nine principal bedrooms, three kitchens and an armoury with equipment for fifty men. There were two separate ranges of buildings for the accommodation of servants. Francis's widow died in 1601, when living at Woburn Abbey, and her will listed Chenies as unfurnished and unoccupied.

Francis was succeeded by his grandson Edward Russell, 3rd Earl of Bedford, who was part of the abortive Essex Rebellion against the queen led by the Robert Devereux, 2nd Earl of Essex. As a result, he was fined £10,000 and confined for a time under house arrest at Chenies. Lady Anne Clifford, the Earl's cousin, stayed at Chenies for a month in 1602. The family fortunes revived after 1603 when King James VI of Scotland succeeded to the English throne as James I, and Edwards's wife, Lucy Russell, Countess of Bedford, became a Lady of the Bedchamber to the queen, Anne of Denmark. In 1608 Chenies was again in the hands of servants and the Russell family never returned.

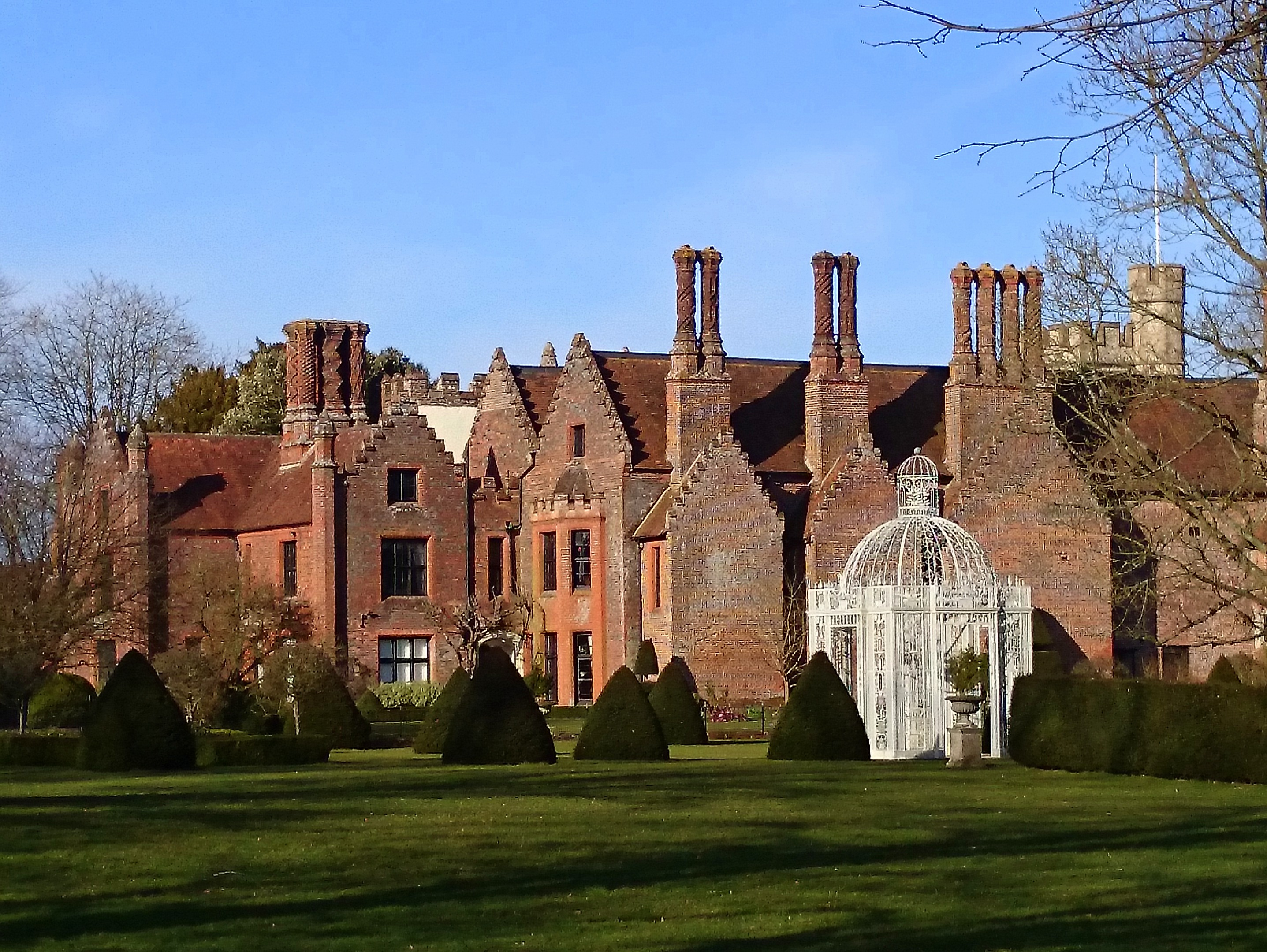
Chenies, south western corner, viewed from the south. At left is the oldest surviving part of the building; at right is the south façade showing its unusual lack of windows

In 1627 the estate passed to Edward's cousin Francis Russell, 4th Earl of Bedford, who had become a member of parliament and a supporter of the parliamentary side in the growing conflict between king and parliament. Francis died in May 1641 before the Civil War broke out, but his son William Russell, 1st Duke of Bedford was also on the parliamentary side, and Chenies was garrisoned with parliamentary troops. Graffiti found in the surviving medieval undercroft suggest that it might have been used as a prison at this time. William was part of the peace faction which sought to come to terms with the king, briefly defecting to the king during 1643, so that he took part in battles on both sides. William had an uneasy relationship with King Charles II after the Restoration of the Monarchy, but returned to favour in the reign of William and Mary, when he was created Duke of Bedford in 1694. By this time the Russell family had developed their estates in London (Bloomsbury and Covent Garden) as well as their other holdings around the country, and Chenies was very much a backwater to their personal and financial lives. However, the family continues to this day to be buried in the Bedford Chapel on the north side of Chenies parish church, next to the manor house.

In 1728 what is now the west wing was let as a farmhouse for £23 per annum. The south wing was largely empty. In 1735 the steward reported, "Chenies place is a very large old house, brick built with some very large and lofty rooms, but the apartments are not very regular and of not more value than to be pulled down." In 1746 the steward made a report on the number of windows because of the newly increased window tax, which went up from a maximum of 22 shillings for houses with 30 or more windows, to 2 shillings plus 1 shilling for each window: "The uninhabited part hath about 54, in the apartment I live in 34. Mr Davies hath 28. As to the 54, they may all be stopped up except 4 or 5, which rooms we lay up the old materials....Out of the 34 in my appartment [sic] I can spare 12 or 14." The tax continued to escalate on larger houses in future decades. In 1749 Horace Walpole visited the house, and reported that it consisted of buildings on three sides of a quadrangle, in very poor repair with some of the roofs missing. He noted that some of the stained glass remained fine; not long afterwards it was removed. Window taxes may have led to the odd look of the southern, sunny, side of the south wing, which might have been expected to look out on gardens, but where there are now very few windows. The entire north range may have been demolished at this time.

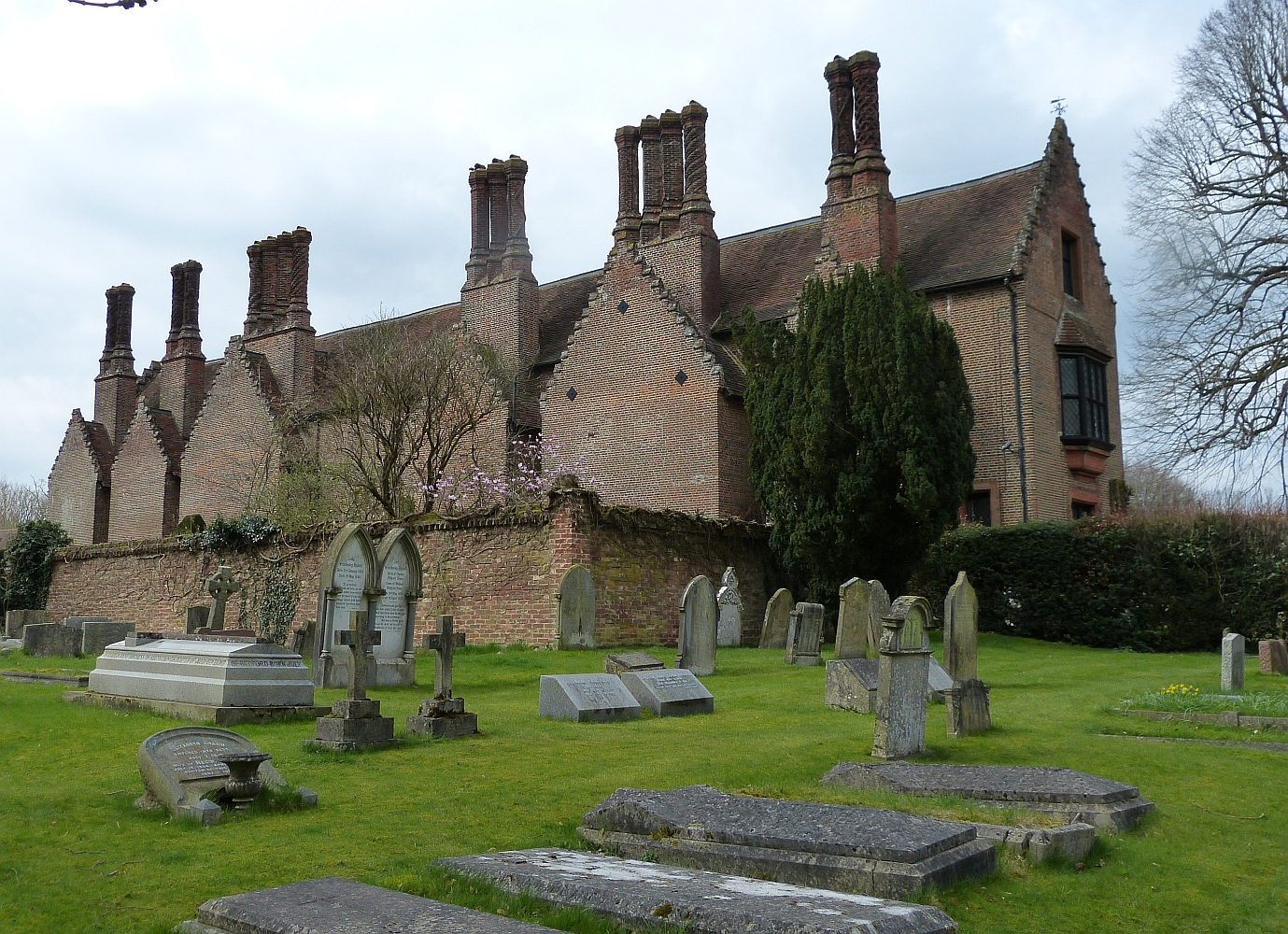
Chenies, south range, viewed from the south east, also lacking windows

By 1760 the south wing had been divided into 5 separate dwellings, with additional doors and stairs. The steward recommended that it would be best to demolish the building entirely, but some repairs were undertaken including new window frames. In about 1830 the architect Edward Blore was hired by Lord Wriothesey Russell to undertake further renovation. In 1840 a Tudor building attached to the west wing was demolished and rebuilt, with two bay windows added.

The manor remained in the possession of the Russells until it was sold in 1954. It is at present owned by the Macleod Matthews family, whose home it is. It is open to the public at limited times, being still used as a private house most of the time. It includes a medieval well, a dungeon and a reputed priest hole. Twenty-three individual-cut brick chimneys distinguish the house and are echoed throughout the village. It is noted for its surrounding gardens, including an extensive physic garden and two mazes (one open, the other with high hedges), set in an estate village overlooking the valley of the River Chess. From the village green a private gravel drive leads up to the Manor House. Immediately outside the gates is the parish church of St Michael on the north side of which is the private Bedford Chapel, built by Anne Sapcote, the widow of the 1st Earl, as requested in his will.

== 21st century historical investigations ==
The manor has been much changed since it was first constructed, without historical records being kept detailing this process, with the result that the exact age of the existing buildings is unclear, as is their relationship to the whole as it existed in Tudor times. Architectural historian Nikolaus Pevsner visited the manor house in the 1960s and described it as: "Beautifully mellow under the trees by the church, and archaeologically a fascinating puzzle."

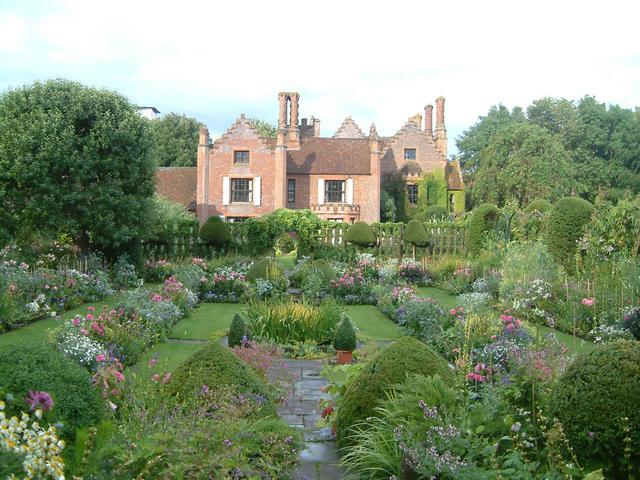
View across the gardens to the west of the manor, looking at the oldest surviving part, which is now the west wing

In 2004 the British archaeological television programme Time Team undertook an archaeological dig on the site to search for evidence of former wings of the manor. It was known at the start of this process that the existing west and south wings had formed parts of a much larger building which was partially described in old documents. It was believed that there had most probably been a quadrangle with north and east wings and a grand gatehouse, later demolished when the building ceased to be owned by such a wealthy family. Time Team started by surveying the region of the existing Tudor boundary wall on the east side of this quadrangle, which it was thought could once have been part of the wall of an eastern wing, but no evidence was found that there might once have been a more substantial structure in that area. Attention then turned to the northern side of the supposed quadrangle, and evidence was indeed found for a substantial Tudor building, broadly in line with the adjacent St Michael's church and extending towards it as had been described historically. However, this was not one side of a quadrangle, but extended an equal distance west of the current west wing.

Dating evidence obtained from timbers used in the west and south wings showed the southern wing to be later in date, though still Tudor. Seven timbers from the roof of the long gallery were positively identified to have precise felling dates in the range 1547–1552, suggesting construction during the year 1552. One large beam from the floor was also tested, giving a felling range of 1540–72, consistent with the date for the roof above. The floor used a timber design with one transverse major beam and tall narrow intermediate joists spanning from it, which makes this the earliest floor to this design which has been positively dated.

Three samples with precise felling dates of 1537–38 were found in the roof of the southern part of the western wing. The northern part of the roof had les precise dates, with a range of felling from 1515 to 1550, which are consistent with the dates for the southern part, the two separate roof sections being of similar design. Ceilings for the rooms below were an integral part of the construction, showing these had not been added later. The part of the building occupying the corner between the west and southern blocks might originally have been part of the western block, or the newer southern building. Samples obtained gave ranges of 1538–61 and 1550–80. Taken together the samples suggest the corner was contemporary with the south wing, but might also be consistent with an existing earlier part of the west wing being modified to join to the new section.

The evidence from the roof timbers suggests that at the time of the royal visit by Henry VIII, the southern wing had not existed. The building at that time may have been a 'T' shape with the long top of the 'T' formed by the now demolished buildings, and the vertical bar by the still existing south wing.

No formal entrance has been established with certainty. An existing freestanding building to the west of the current west wing, dates to Tudor times. It was thought this might have framed the formal gateway, which would have been between it and the western end of the missing north wing, facing west. Other buildings might then have framed a yard to the west of what is now the western wing. The demolished north wing was widest in the centre, with narrower extensions at either end. The excavations revealed evidence that the central block had originally had a straight northern face, overlooking formal gardens further north, which had then been remodelled with bay windows. It was estimated that the Tudor building was perhaps six times the extent of the buildings still remaining.

During the course of the excavation samples of 12th and 13th century pottery were found at various places. While this did not prove the existence of a manor house on the site at that time, it did confirm there was some sort of occupation. Taken with the existence of the Tudor and medieval buildings, plus the adjacent church, it is reasonable to assume this was also the site of Isenhamsted Manor. One piece of pottery was discovered probably dating to the early Bronze Age.

== Media appearances ==
The manor has been used many times in television programmes, such as To Play the King and also Midsomer Murders. It has also been used for scenes in dramatisations of classic period novels such as by Jane Austen and more recently the TV serial Little Dorrit, based on the eponymous book by Charles Dickens, in 2008.

In 1999 it appeared as the big house in the film Tom's Midnight Garden. In 2007 it was used as a location for the Woody Allen film Cassandra's Dream. Actors Ewan McGregor and Colin Farrell filmed scenes in the garden area.

The gardens, famous for their tulips, are promoted by the Campaign to Protect Rural England.
