= Anne Russell, Countess of Warwick =

English noblewoman

Anne Dudley
- Countess of Warwick
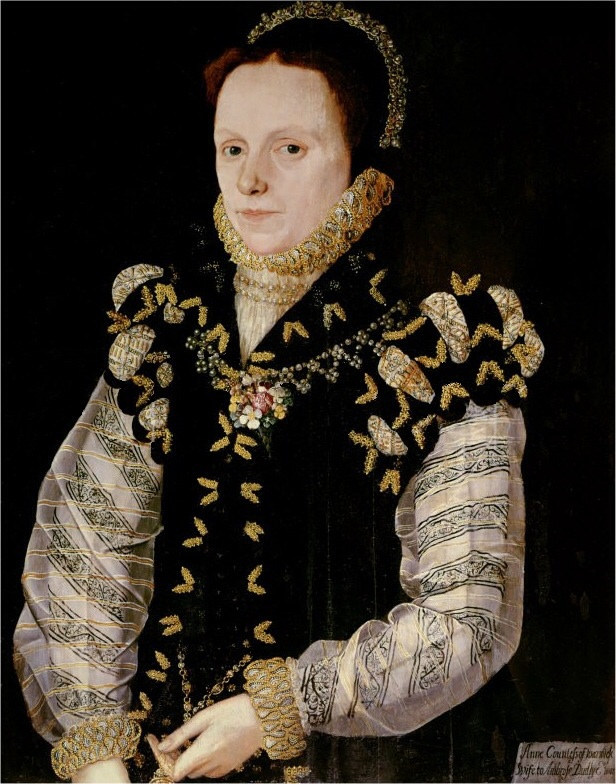
- Born: 1548/1549
- Died: 9 February 1604; Northaw, Hertfordshire
- Buried: Chenies, Buckinghamshire
- Noble family: Russell
- Spouse: Ambrose Dudley, 3rd Earl of Warwick
- Father: Francis Russell, 2nd Earl of Bedford
- Mother: Margaret St. John

Anne Dudley (née Russell), Countess of Warwick (1548/1549 – 9 February 1604) was an English noblewoman, and a lady-in-waiting and close friend of Elizabeth I. She was the third wife of Ambrose Dudley, 3rd Earl of Warwick.

== Family and marriage ==
Anne Russell was the eldest daughter of Francis Russell, 2nd Earl of Bedford and his first wife Margaret St. John. Possibly serving the future Elizabeth I from childhood, she became a maid of honour in 1559, shortly after the Queen's accession.

When she was 16 her father and Elizabeth's favourite, Robert Dudley, 1st Earl of Leicester, arranged her marriage to Ambrose Dudley, 3rd Earl of Warwick, Leicester's elder brother and nearly 20 years his bride's senior. The ceremony was performed on 11 November 1565 in the royal chapel at Whitehall Palace. The wedding was one of the great court festivities of Elizabeth's reign, with tournaments and banquets; it was also of political significance, since it matched two of the major Puritan families in the country. Neither Ambrose, twice a widower, nor Robert Dudley, a widower unlikely to remarry, had as yet any issue, so that to this marriage were pinned the hopes of the Dudley family's dynastic survival. However, no children were born to the couple, and as early as c. 1570 Robert Dudley wrote in a letter: "my brother you see long married and not like to have children". The marriage nevertheless turned out to be happy. During the 1570s and 1580s, the couple's principal residence outside London was North Hall in Northaw, Hertfordshire.

Like other courtiers, the Countess of Warwick gave valuable New Year's Day gifts to Elizabeth I, including a silver table and a perfuming pan, in 1578 sleeves and a skirt complementing a gown given by the Earl, and in 1588 a pair of gold earrings and a gold flower like a star. She also gave the queen a spoon with a coral handle set with a diamond and a fork set with rubies. The fork, an item rarely noted in Elizabethan inventories, may have been used for fruit or ginger syrup desserts known as sucket.

Ambrose Dudley suffered for decades from the effects of a leg injury sustained in military service in 1563. At the end of January 1590 his leg was amputated, as a consequence of which he died at Bedford House in the Strand, London on 21 February. The diplomat Sir Edward Stafford had visited him and his wife two days before; he had found the Earl in great suffering "which lasted him unto his death", and the Countess sitting "by the fire so full of tears that she could not speak".

== Widowhood ==
From her husband Anne Dudley inherited debts to the amount of some £7000. She retained the house at Northaw as her main residence for the rest of her life. In 1602 she sold a cottage in a garden in Stratford-upon-Avon to William Shakespeare. The Countess was the dedicatee of some 20 books. Many were by Puritan religious authors, yet she was also a patron of the poet Edmund Spenser in the 1590s.

Anne Countess of Warwick was the aunt and godmother of the diarist Lady Anne Clifford, and "a mother in affection" to her youngest brother, William, as well as her sisters Elizabeth and Margaret after their mother's death. She was also on the best terms with her brother-in-law, the Earl of Leicester, who wrote that he "did both honor & esteme hir asmoch as any brother did his syster". Anne Dudley served as an unsalaried Gentlewoman of the Queen's Privy chamber. According to Anne Clifford the Countess was one of Elizabeth's favourite ladies, "more beloved and in greater favour ... than any other woman in the kingdom". She was believed to be very influential in matters of patronage, and was at the dying Queen's bedside on March 24, 1603. Under the new sovereigns elderly widows had no place at court, although she was graciously received by King James on his arrival in England. "Something ill and melancholy", Anne Dudley retired to Hertfordshire in the autumn of 1603, where she died surrounded by her family on 9 February 1604. According to her wishes she was buried with her ancestors in the Bedford Chapel at St. Michael's Church, Chenies, Buckinghamshire.
