= Peter Allibond =

English translator (1560–1629)

Peter Allibond (1560 – 6 March 1629), was an English translator of theological treatises from the French and Latin.

He was the father of Dr John Allibond. Allibond was born in 1560 at Wardington, near Banbury, where many generations of his family had resided. Becoming a student of Magdalen Hall, Oxford, in 1578, he proceeded to his bachelor's degree in 1581 and to his master's in 1585. After some years spent in foreign travel, he entered into holy orders, and subsequently became rector of Chenies in Buckinghamshire, "where," says Anthony à Wood, "continuing many years, he did much improve the ignorant with his sound doctrine." It was while holding this benefice that he undertook his literary work.

In 1591 he published a book entitled Comfort for an Afflicted Conscience, wherein is contained both Consolation and Instruction for the Sicke, against the fearfull apprehension of their sinnes, of death and the devill, of the curse of the law, and of the anger and iust iudgment of God. Written by John de l'Espine, and translated by Peter Allibond. Allibond died on 6 March 1628–9, and was buried in the chancel of his parish church. Anthony à Wood describes him as "an ingenious man in the opinion of all that knew him." Three sons survived him, of whom Job, the youngest, became a convert to the Catholic Church.
