= John Allibond =

Master of Magdalen College School

John Allibond (1597–1658) was the master of Magdalen College School.

Allibond was born in Buckinghamshire, England, at Chenies, of which his father, Peter Allibond, was rector. He was educated at Magdalen College, Oxford, where he was admitted as chorister in 1612, matriculated 7 June 1616, proceeded B.A. in the same year, and M.A. three years later, and was clerk of the college from 1617 to 1625. He was master of the free school adjoining Magdalen from 1625 to 1632, and lectured on the theory of music; became D.D. 17 Oct 1643; was rector of St Mary de Crypt Church, Gloucester, from 1634 to 1638; was perpetual curate of St. Nicholas, Gloucester, from 1635 to 1645; and was appointed rector of Broadwell, Gloucestershire, in 1636, where he died in 1658.

Allibond provided an informative, if biased, description of the election for Gloucestershire's representatives to the Short Parliament in March 1640 in a letter to Peter Heylyn.

Allibond published anonymously ‘Rustica Acad. Ox. nuper reformatæ descriptio in Visitatione fanatica Octobris 6o, &c., 1648, cum Comitiis ibidem anno sequente . . . habitis,’ 1648. This was reprinted in 1705, in 1717 (with English verse translation by Ned Ward), and again in 1834. It appears also in Somer's Tracts. It is a very lively anti-puritan satire on the first stage of the parliamentary visitation. A manuscript key exists among Wood's papers. Allibond was also author of Latin verses in ‘Britanniæ Natalis,’ Oxon. 1630; of ‘Dulcissimis Capitibus etc. Invitatio ad frugi Prandiolum,’ printed in the ‘Clerk's Register,’ p. 48; and of a ‘Concio ad Clerum Oxoniensium’ among the Taylor MSS. at Oxford. He was an intimate friend of Peter Heylyn.
