= Chenies =

Village in Buckinghamshire, England

Coordinates: 51.675°N 0.532°W

- Location within Buckinghamshire
- Population: 246 (2011)
- OS grid reference: TQ016984
- Civil parish: Chenies
- Unitary authority: Buckinghamshire
- Ceremonial county: Buckinghamshire
- Region: South East
- Country: England
- Sovereign state: United Kingdom
- Post town: RICKMANSWORTH
- Postcode district: WD3
- Dialling code: 01923, 01494
- Police: Thames Valley
- Fire: Buckinghamshire
- Ambulance: South Central
- UK Parliament: Chesham & Amersham

Chenies is a village and civil parish in south-east Buckinghamshire, England. It is on the border with Hertfordshire, east of Amersham and north of Chorleywood.

== History ==
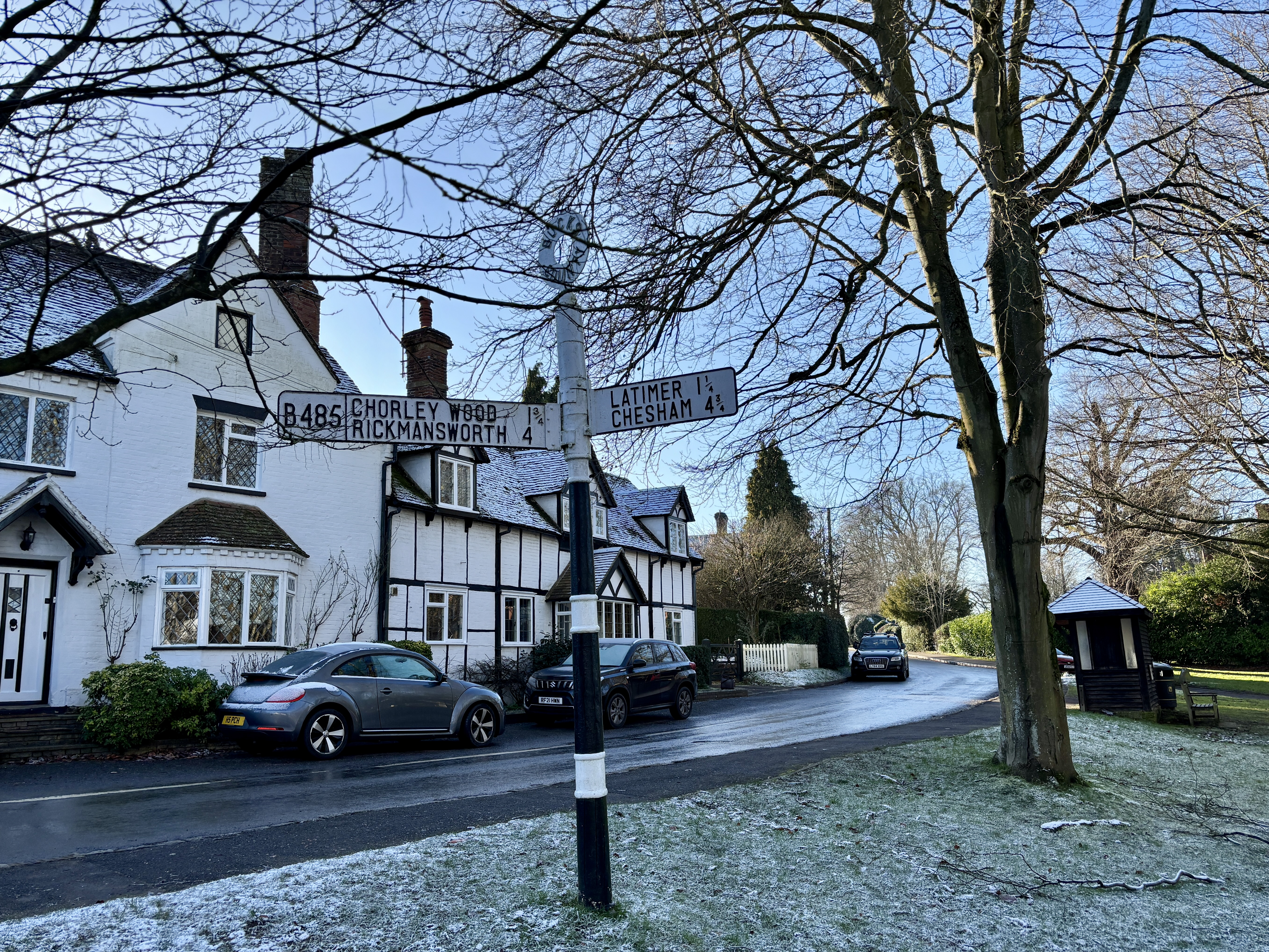
Chenies (junction of Latimer Road and Claypit Lane) in January 2025

Until the 13th century, the village name was Isenhampstead. There were two villages here, called Isenhampstead Chenies and Isenhampstead Latimers, distinguished by the lords of the manors of those two places. In the 19th century the prefix was dropped and the two villages became known as Chenies and Latimer.

Near this village there was once a royal hunting-box, where both King Edward I and King Edward II were known to have resided. It was the owner of this lodge, Edward III's shield bearer, Thomas Cheyne, who first gave his name to the village and his descendant, Sir John Cheyne, who built Chenies Manor House in around 1460 on the site.

Several paper mills were once established in Chenies, operated by the River Chess, which flowed here from further west in Buckinghamshire.

The village was held by the Cheney family from 1180 and passed by marriage successively to the Semark and Sapcote families and then, in 1526, to the Russell family (John Russell, 1st Earl of Bedford married Anne Sapcote). On June 12, 1954, the entire village was sold at auction for £182,000 in order to pay the death duties occasioned by the death of Hastings Russell, 12th Duke of Bedford. The 1,676-acre property included seven dairy farms, 44 homes, a hotel, 255 acres of woodland, watercress beds, and fishing rights.

== St Michael's Church ==
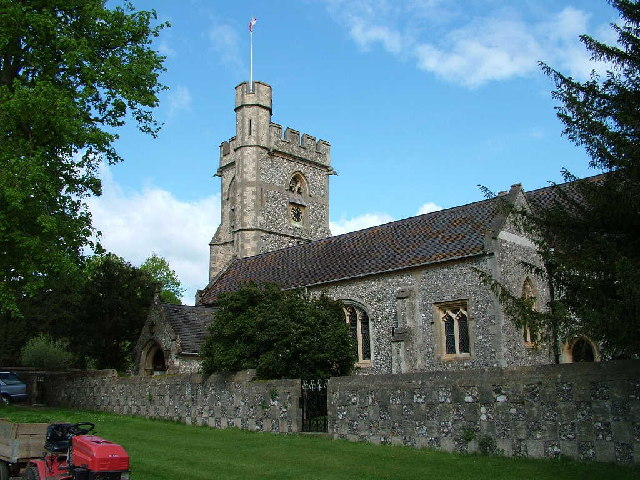
St Michael's Church

The parish church of St Michael includes the Bedford Chapel, burial place of many notable members of the Russell family. The church is not of great architectural interest but stands in an attractive position in the Chess Valley near the manor house. "The fabulous series of monuments to the Russells, Dukes of Bedford, and their connexions ... [are according to] the late Mrs. Esdaile ... 'one of the finest collections of tombs in England'."

The churchyard extension contains the war grave of an airman of World War II, Aircraftsman 2nd Class John Lionel Crook, who died on 12 December 1944.

== Sport ==
Chenies and Latimer Cricket Club play at the cricket ground in the village.

== See also ==
- Chenies Manor House
