= Grant Harrold =

British businessman, former butler to Charles III (born 1978)

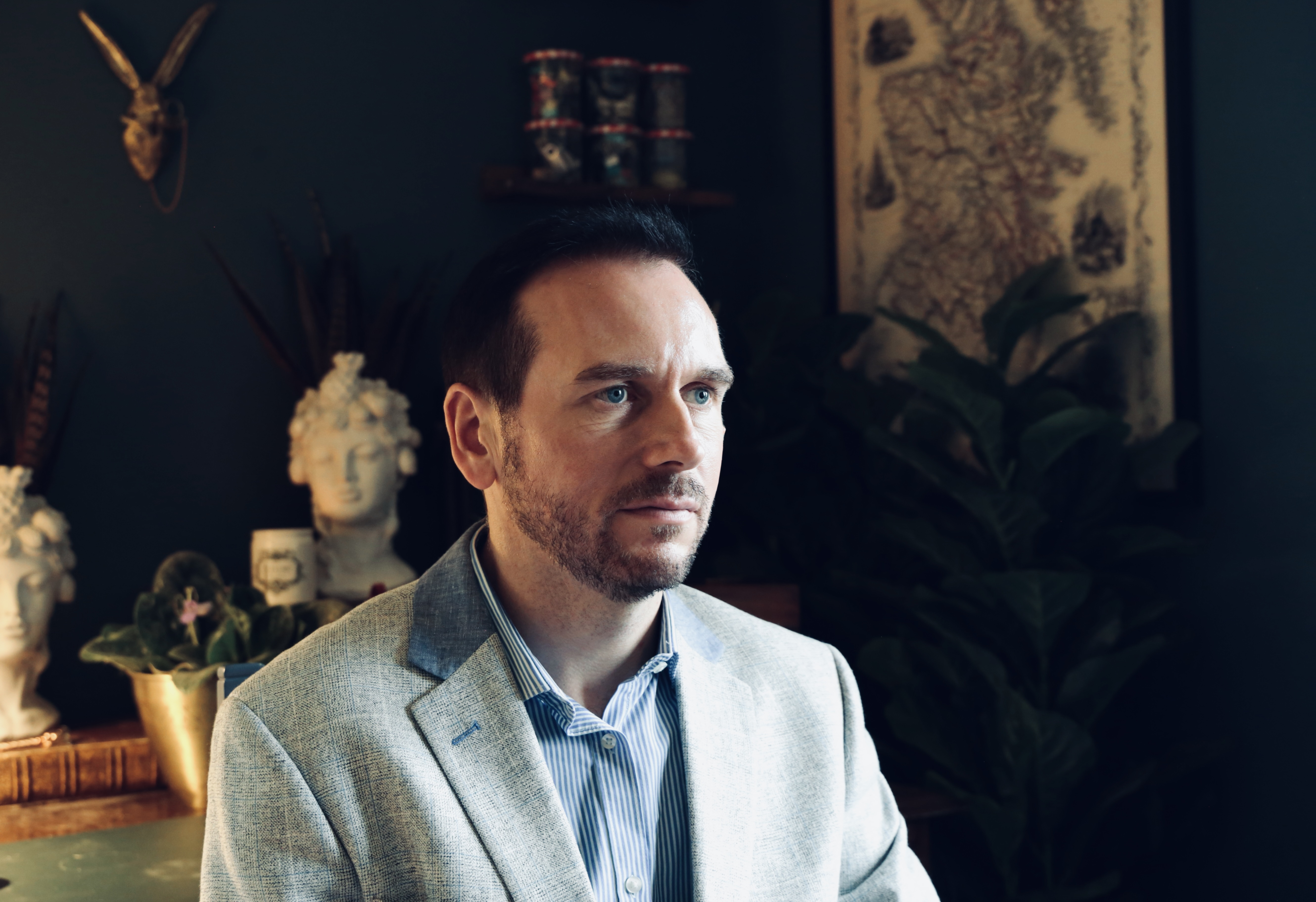
- Born: Grant William Veitch Harrold; 26 April 1978 (age 48); Airdrie, North Lanarkshire, Scotland
- Other name: The Royal Butler
- Occupations: Butler, etiquette expert, media personality
- Known for: Former butler to King Charles III, Queen Camilla, William, Prince of Wales and Prince Harry

Grant William Veitch Harrold (born 26 April 1978) is a British former butler to King Charles III (when he was Prince of Wales), now a British etiquette expert, and broadcaster.

== Youth ==
Grant Harrold was born in a Scottish working class family, living in a council house in Airdrie, North Lanarkshire. His father loved to visit castles and stately homes with his sons. The British royals were at the heart of the family fascination with aristocracy. Grant was too young to appreciate watching the 1981 wedding of Prince Charles and Lady Diana Spencer on television, but sat enthralled as Prince Andrew married Sarah Ferguson. The Queen Mother was his father’s favourite, but Grant himself adored Queen Elizabeth II. Grant Harrold didn’t feel happy at school. He felt different. While other boys were obsessed with football and computer games, Grant was living in his own imaginary kingdom, dreaming of the castle he would one day live in. Harrold was bullied at school. His mental escape was dreaming of moving as far as possible from Airdrie and becoming a member of the royal family, or at least working for them.

== Career ==
In his memoirs, The Royal Butler. My remarkable life of royal service (2025), Harrold describes his lifelong obsession with the British royal family. As a teenager he watched the documentary Elizabeth R: A Year in the Life of the Queen and The Remains of the Day. Queen Elizabeth II became his icon, the way other boys adored pop stars. He took opportunities to become a butler and get as close to the British royal family as possible.

He first worked as a butler at Ben Alder Lodge in Scotland, an ancient hunting home dating back to the seventeenth century which was later enlarged and modernised. His first employers were two families who shared the house: Urs Schwarzenbach and his wife Francesca, a former Miss Australia; and Major Christopher Hanbury and his wife Bridget. The Hanburys were close to the British royal family. During Harrold's service he met Prince Edward, son of Queen Elizabeth II, and his then-girlfriend Sophie Rhys-Jones.

Harrold's second opportunity came at Woburn Abbey. At the time, it was the object of a fly-to-the-wall BBC-documentary called Country House. He applied for a job after hearing a second series of Country House was planned. By serving at Woburn Abbey he learned to work as a butler for aristocratic families, and also immediately became a television star.

An ultimate opportunity came when his mother told him Clarence House, the main residence of the then-Prince of Wales, was looking for a butler. Harrold got an interview in October 2003. He learned that the butler vacancy was at Highgrove House, the Prince of Wales's family residence in Tetbury, Gloucester. He was warned he would have to relearn the job from scratch.

Harrold worked as a butler for Charles III from 2004 to 2011, when he was Prince of Wales. In 2011 the position of butler became redundant. In preparation for the time when Charles would one day become king, his household scaled back operations in his several houses. There were cutbacks, and a butler on duty at Highgrove was no longer required. Harrold's last day at Highgrove was 17 May 2011.

Harrold also looked after William, Prince of Wales and Catherine, Princess of Wales during his time at Highgrove. In his memoirs, The Royal Butler, he gives details about his contacts with members of the British royal family.

Based in Tetbury, Gloucestershire, he now runs an etiquette and butler school. He also gives talks and demonstrations on etiquette for afternoon tea, dinner parties and similar events. In 2014, Harrold's company Nicholas Veitch Limited, alongside Blenheim Palace, founded The Royal School of Butlers.

Since 2023, Harrold has served as a brand ambassador and Insight Speaker aboard Cunard, Princess Cruises, and Seabourn ships, delivering lectures to cruises guests on etiquette and his royal experiences.

== Media ==
Harrold first appeared regularly as the butler on the reality television programme Country House at Woburn Abbey between 2000 and 2003 whilst working for Robin Russell, 14th Duke of Bedford and his son Andrew Russell, 15th Duke of Bedford. In 2012, Harrold was part of the BBC Three series Be Your Own Boss.

He has also had appearances on television programmes including Can't Get the Staff and The Bachelor.

He regularly appears as a royal commentator on BBC News, Sky News, GB News, and in royal-themed television documentaries.

In 2026, Harrold joined The Royals Uncensored, a royal-focused spin-off of Piers Morgan Uncensored, appearing as a host alongside Katie Nicholl and Jo Elvin.

== Social media ==
Harrold has established a notable online presence under the brand "The Royal Butler", and has amassed a following of nearly 1 million across platforms including Instagram, TikTok, YouTube, Facebook, Threads, and Twitter. His monthly reach is estimated at between 3 and 9 million interactions.

== Publication ==
Harrold's memoir, The Royal Butler: My Remarkable Life in Royal Service, was published on 28 August 2025 by Orion Publishing.

== Controversies ==
In 2020, Harrold applied to register "The Royal Butler" as trademark for his business, but the trademark was denied. He claimed that he had won the right to the trademark as part of a settlement when he left Royal service.

The British newspaper The Times reported that Harrold reached an out-of-court settlement with the royal household in 2012 over claims that he was forced out of his £24,000-a-year job by bullying. Harrold does not mention these incidents in his memoirs. He claims the position of butler became redundant, and says he was offered the chance to move to London. He refused this, because the role would be very different from what he was used to, and he did not relish the thought of living in a big city.

In 2021, he was criticised by Asian communities for suggesting that people should never eat rice with their hands, a practice common in many Asian countries.
