= Tiarks =

Tiarks is a surname. Notable people with the surname include:

- Frank Cyril Tiarks (1874–1952), British banker
- Geoffrey Lewis Tiarks (1909–1987), British Anglican bishop
- Henrietta Joan Tiarks (born 1940), later Henrietta Russell, Duchess of Bedford, British landowner and horse breeder who married the 14th Duke of Bedford
- Johann Ludwig Tiarks (1789–1837), German astronomer in British service, who surveyed the Canada–US border in the 19th century
- John Tiarks, (1903–1974), British Anglican bishop
