= Armada Portrait =

Group of related portraits of Elizabeth I of England

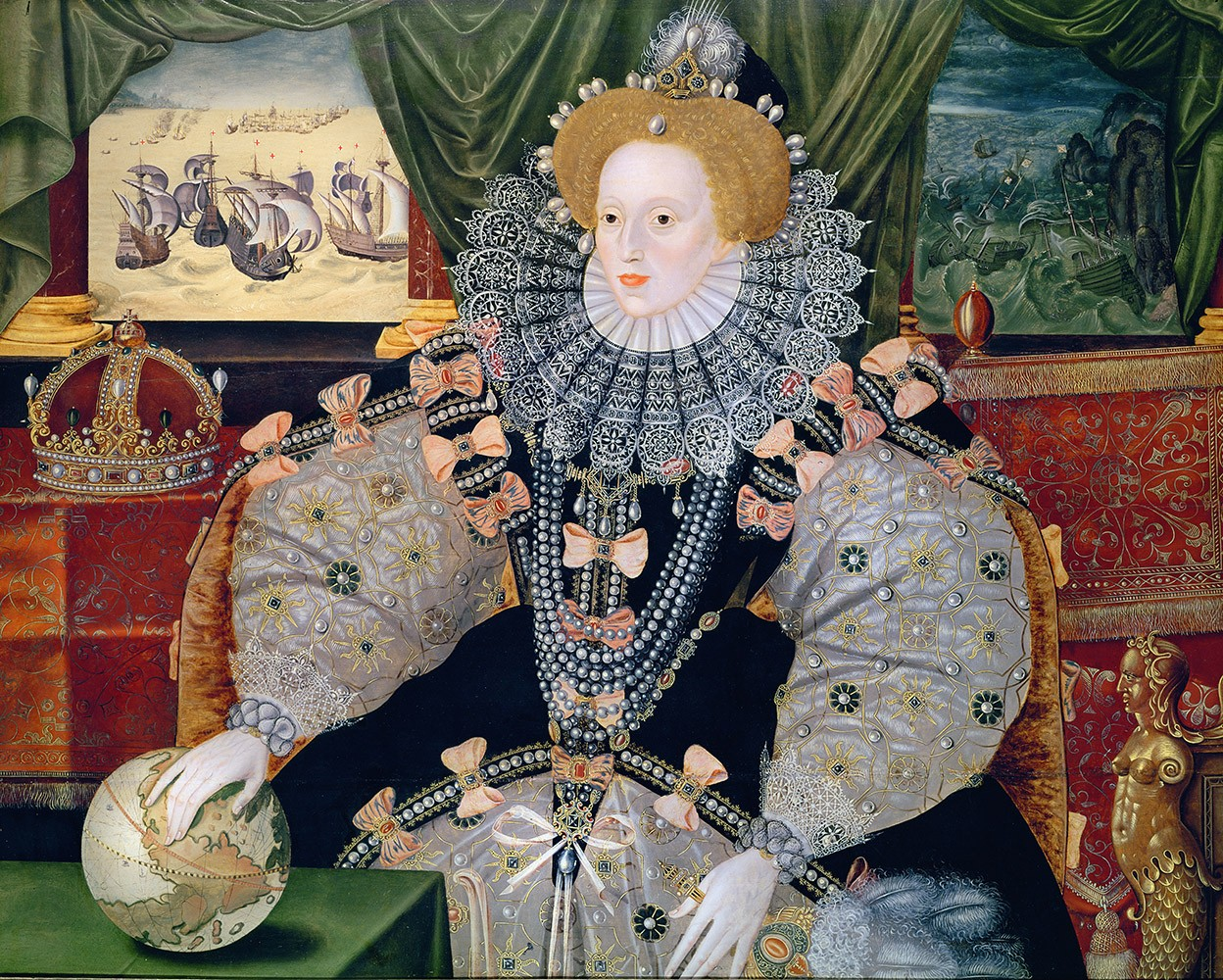
- Artist: Unknown English artist (formerly attributed to George Gower)
- Year: 1588
- Type: Oil on oak panel
- Location: Woburn Abbey

The Armada Portrait of Elizabeth I of England is the name of any of three surviving versions of an allegorical panel painting depicting the Tudor queen surrounded by symbols of royal majesty against a backdrop representing the defeat of the Spanish Armada in 1588.

== Iconography ==
The combination of a life-sized portrait of Elizabeth I with a landscape format is "quite unprecedented in her portraiture", although allegorical portraits in this format, such as the Family of Henry VIII: An Allegory of the Tudor Succession, a 1572 portrait attributed to Lucas de Heere pre-date the Armada Portrait.

English art in this period was isolated from trends in Catholic Italy, and owed more to Flemish manuscript illumination and heraldic representation than to Renaissance ideas of unity in time and space in art. The 'Armada Portrait' is no exception: the chair to the right is viewed from two different angles, as are the tables on the left, and the background shows two different stages in the defeat of the Armada. In the background view on the left, English fireships drift towards the Spanish fleet, and on the right the Spanish ships are driven onto a rocky coast amid stormy seas by the "Protestant Wind". On a secondary level, these images show Elizabeth turning her back on storm and darkness while sunlight shines where she gazes, iconography that would be repeated in Marcus Gheeraerts the Younger's 1592 "Ditchley" portrait of the queen.

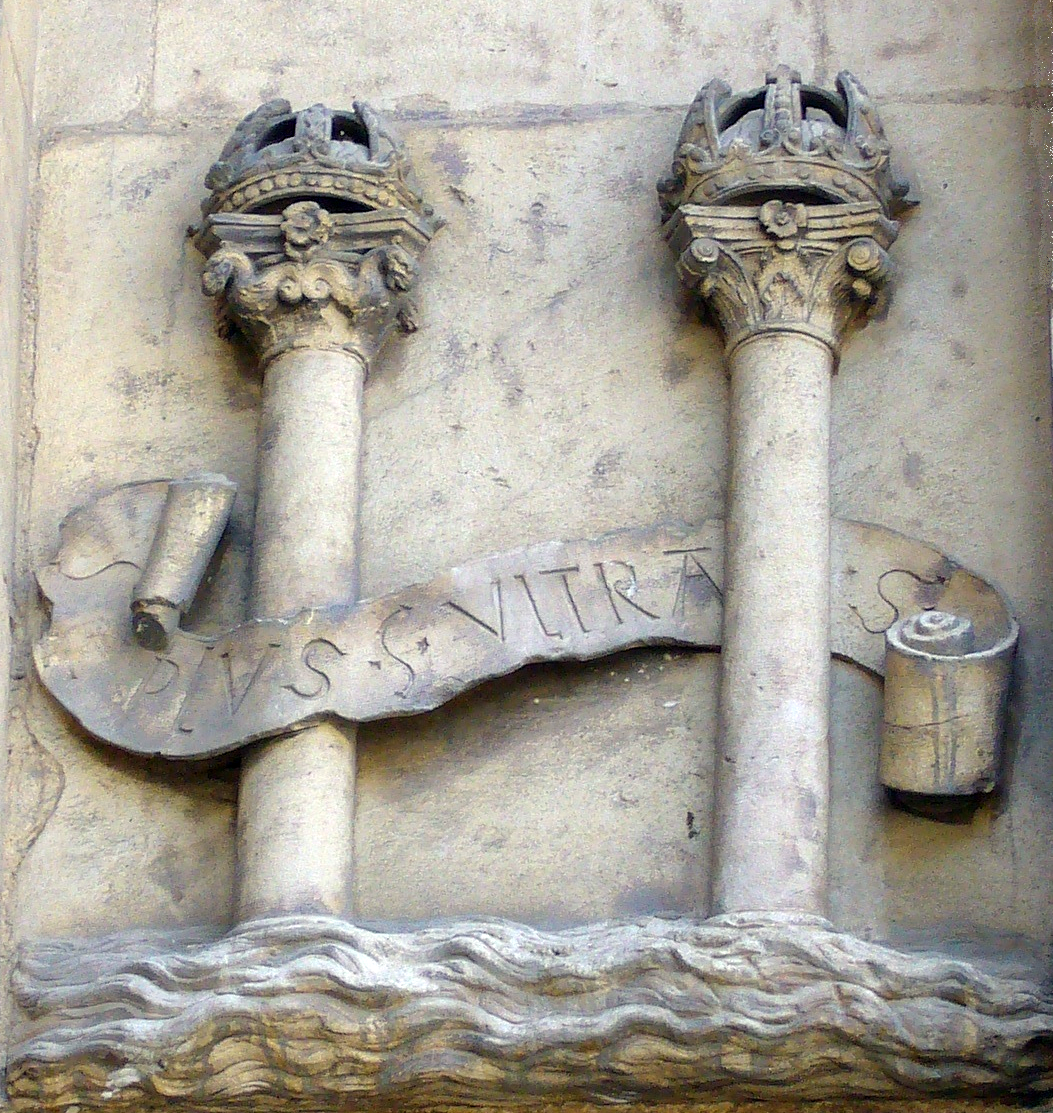
Personal device of Charles V, in the Seville city hall

The queen's hand rests on a globe below a crown (probably not the state crown), "her fingers covering the Americas, indicating England's [command of the seas] and [dreams of establishing colonies] in the New World". The queen is flanked by two columns behind, probably a reference to the famous impresa of Charles V, Philip II's father, which represented the Pillars of Hercules. The composition was painted following the greatest threats to Elizabeth's power, therefore this portrait aimed to reinforce her position as a capable female monarch.

Art historians Andrew Belsey and Catherine Belsey have pointed out the striking geometry of the painting, with the repeating patterns of circles and arches described by the crown, the globe, and the sleeves, ruff, and gown worn by the queen. Cultural historian, Isabel Davis, has noted that the portrait is composed using the structure provided by a Portolan map or sea chart: a ring of wind roses or compasses linked by a rhumbline network. Belsey and Belsey also contrast the figure of the Virgin Queen wearing the large pearl symbolizing chastity suspended from her bodice in front of her groin, it is also representative of Cynthia (Artemis), Greek Goddess of the moon and Virgin. They are further contrasted to the mermaid carved on the chair of state, which they claim either represent female wiles luring sailors to their doom, or that the mermaid symbolises the executed Queen Mary. Davis, in contrast, argues that the mermaid contributes to the cartographic design of the portrait. Elizabeth is facing away from the mermaid, possibly indicating that their conspiracies and Mary's execution have been put behind by Elizabeth. The crown also symbolises the English monarchy.

The chains of pearls in the portrait may represent the pearls which Elizabeth had bought from the collection of Mary, Queen of Scots in 1568, or further a reference to her mother Anne Boleyn. It is also suggested by historian Nicola Tallis in her book ‘Elizabeth’s Rival’ that the chain of pearls were bequeathed to Elizabeth following the death of her favourite the 1st Earl of Leicester.

== Versions ==
There are three surviving versions of the portrait, in addition to several derivative portraits:

- The version at Woburn Abbey
- The version in the National Portrait Gallery, London, which has been cut down at both sides leaving just a portrait of the queen.
- The version owned by the Tyrwhitt-Drake family, which may have been commissioned by Sir Francis Drake, was first recorded at Shardeloes in Buckinghamshire in 1775. Scholars agree that this version is by a different hand, noting distinctive techniques and approaches to the modelling of the queen's features. This version was heavily overpainted in the later 17th century, which complicates attribution and may account for several differences in details of the costume. The Drake version was purchased for the nation for £10.3 million in July 2016 following an Art Fund appeal. The work is hung in the national collection of Royal Museums Greenwich (RMG), in the Queen's House, a 17th-century royal residence built on the site of the original Greenwich Palace, Elizabeth I's birthplace.

The first two portraits were formerly attributed to Elizabeth's Serjeant Painter George Gower, but curators at the National Portrait Gallery now believe that all three versions were created in separate workshops, and assign the attributions to "an unknown English artist".

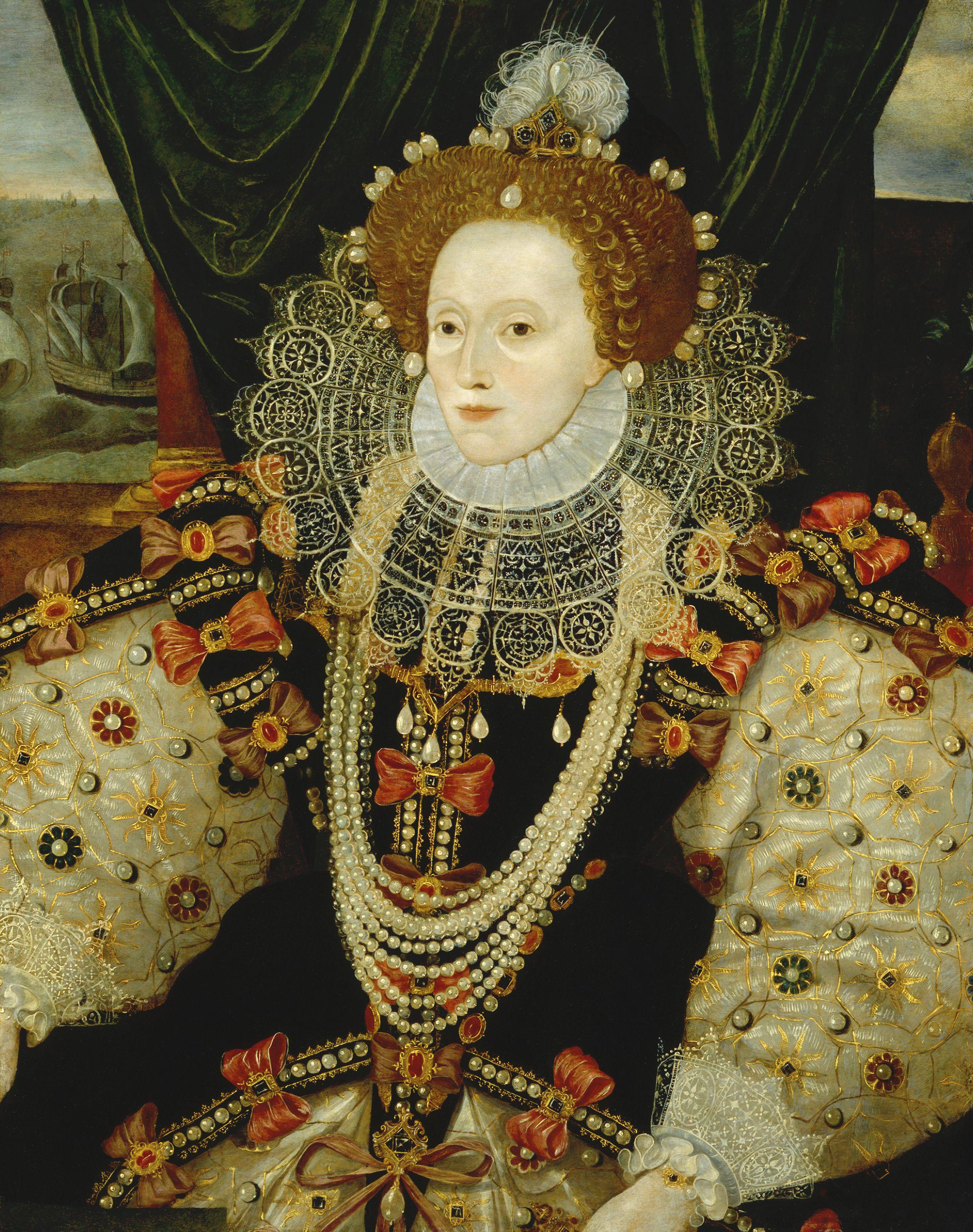
National Portrait Gallery version

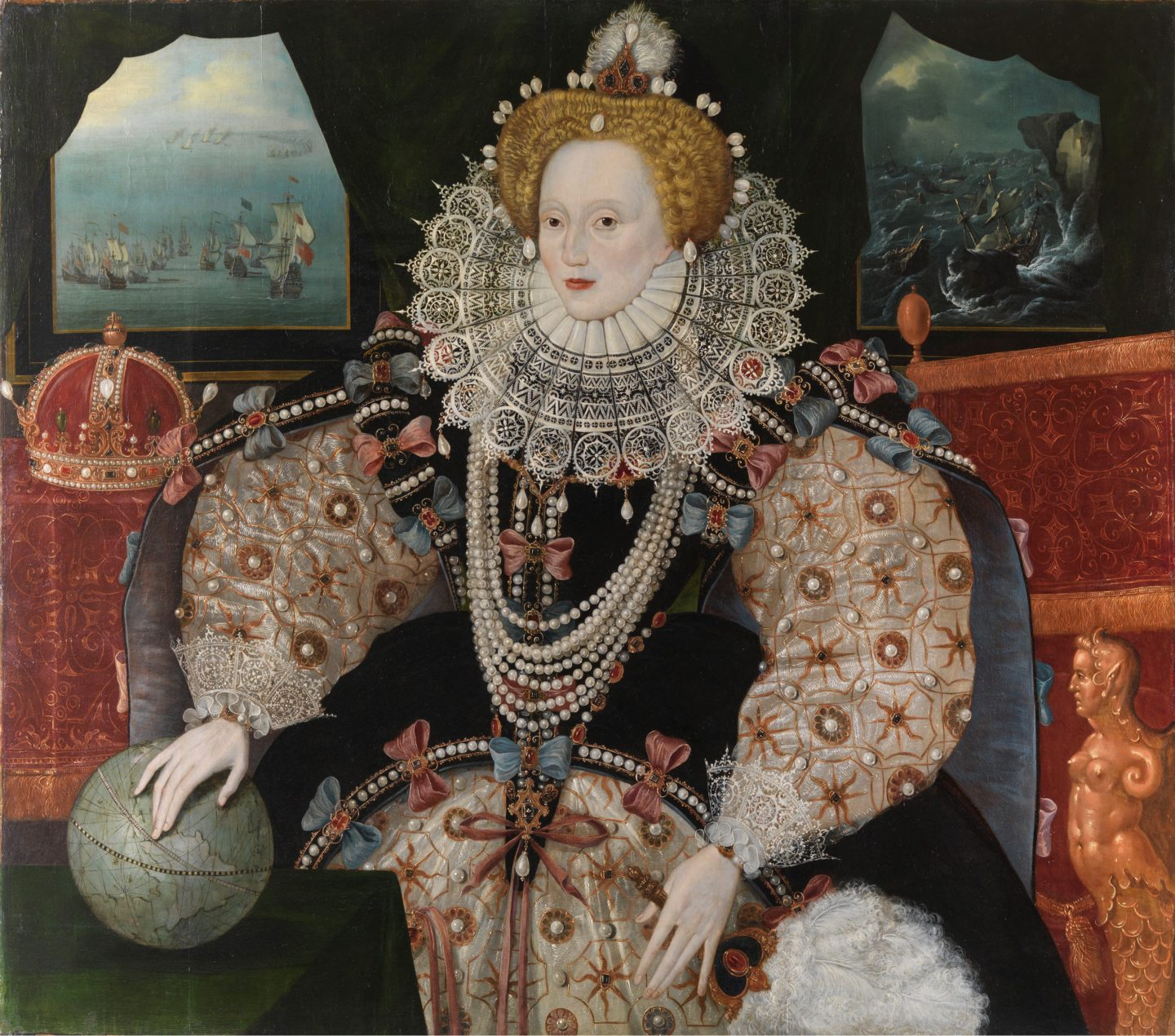
The "Drake" version, now at Queen's House, Royal Museums Greenwich

== See also ==
- Artists of the Tudor Court
- Portraiture of Elizabeth I
- George Gower
- 1550–1600 in fashion
