= He blew with His winds, and they were scattered =

Phrase used to celebrate the triumph of England over the 1588 Spanish Armada

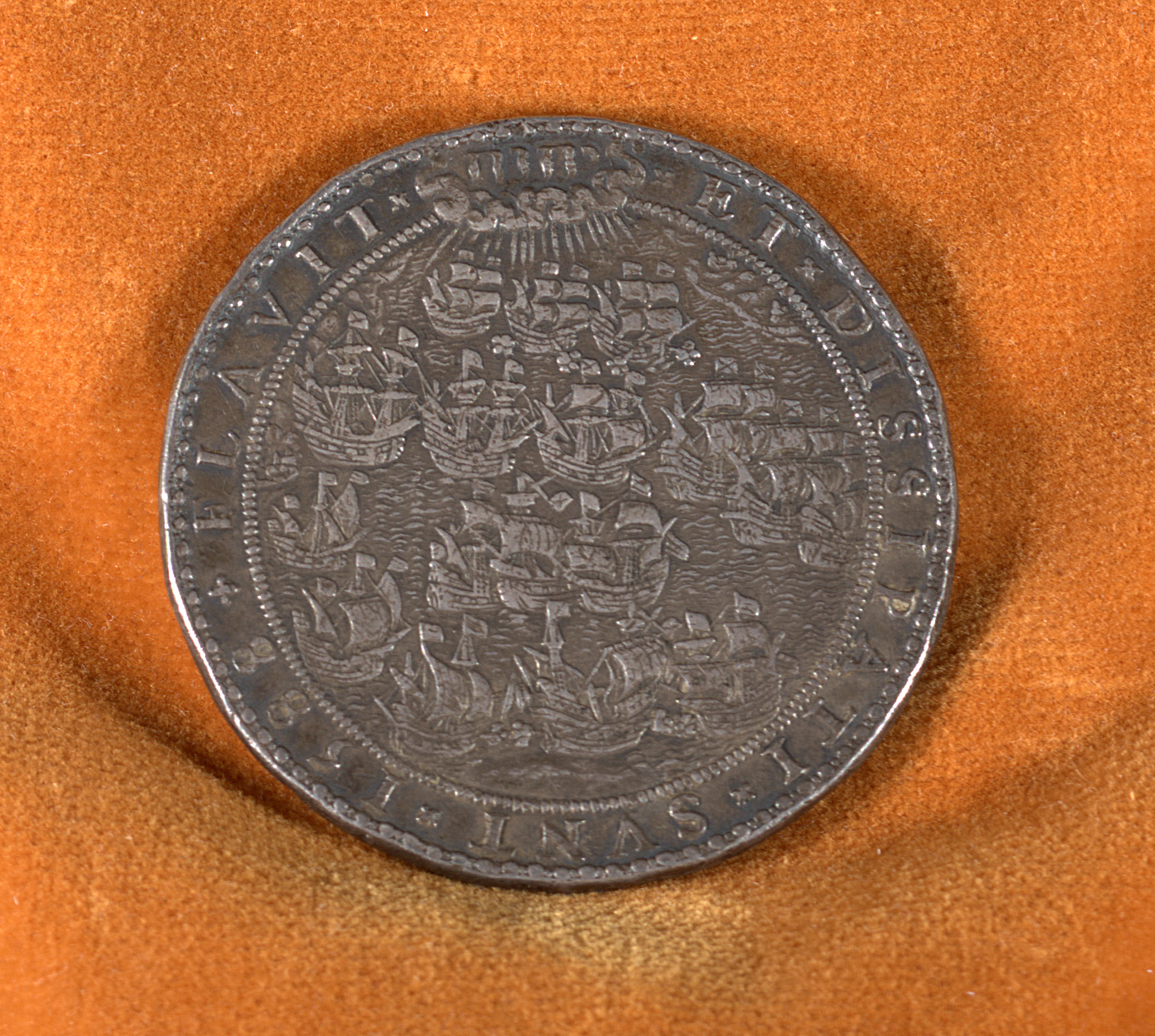
Armada Medal, bearing the inscription Flavit Jehovah et Dissipati Sunt

He blew with His winds, and they were scattered (Latin: Flavit et Dissipati Sunt) is a phrase used in the aftermath of the defeat of the Spanish Armada in 1588. It referred to the storms in the northern Atlantic Ocean that destroyed much of the Armada, a large naval fleet commanded by the Duke of Medina Sidonia, after it retreated following an engagement with the English and Dutch fleets off the coast of Calais. Medina Sidonia had been under orders from the Spanish King Philip II to invade England and to overthrow the Protestant English Queen Elizabeth I. Philip hoped thereby to reinstate Catholicism in England and end English support for the Dutch Republic in the Eighty Years' War, thus also preventing further attacks by English and Dutch privateers against the Spanish Empire in the Americas.

Medina Sidonia's fleet had been supposed to meet in the Spanish Netherlands with the ground troops commanded by the Duke of Parma, an army of over 30,000 men ready to land in England under the Armada's protection. However, unfavourable weather conditions, poor communications, and the unexpectedly strong resistance of the English fleet under Admiral Howard forced Medina Sidonia to return to Spain by rounding the northern coasts of Scotland and Ireland. The Spaniards' unfamiliarity with those waters, together with unusually powerful storms in the region, caused many of the ships to run aground in the western coast of Ireland, decimating the Armada.

The routing of the Spanish Armada, and especially the role of the weather in it, was interpreted by many in England and the Netherlands as a sign of God's support for the Protestant cause. The use in this context of the phrase Flavit et Dissipati Sunt, taken from the Biblical text of Job 4:9, seems to have originated in the inscription of a Dutch commemorative medal that was struck to mark the occasion. The English text "He blew with His Winds, and they were scattered" is inscribed upon the Armada Memorial in Plymouth Hoe, built in 1888 to mark the 300th anniversary of these events. The role of the weather in the Spanish Armada's defeat has also been called the "Protestant Wind", a term that is also applied to the weather conditions that favoured the landing in England of the army of the Dutch Prince William of Orange in 1688, enabling the "Glorious Revolution" that deposed the Catholic King James II.

== Background ==
Relations between Catholic Spain and Protestant England had been souring for a considerable period of time, eventually leading the outbreak of the undeclared Anglo-Spanish War in 1585. Events had been brought to a head by the English support for the revolt of the Dutch Protestant United Provinces against Spanish rule, in the Eighty Years' War. To prevent further English support for the Dutch Protestant cause, King Philip II of Spain planned an invasion of England. On 29 July 1587, he received authority from Pope Sixtus V to overthrow the English Queen Elizabeth, who had previously been excommunicated by Pope Pius V, and to place whomever Philip chose on the throne of England.

An Armada, the Spanish word for a battle fleet, was prepared to invade England, defeat its armies and depose Elizabeth. It consisted of around 130 ships, 8,000 sailors and 18,000 soldiers, 1,500 brass guns and 1,000 iron guns, and it was formally named as the Grande y Felicísima Armada ("Great and Most Fortunate Navy"). The Spanish Empire at this time was the wealthiest and most powerful in the world. By comparison, England was regarded as economically and militarily weak, as well as lacking in strong Continental allies.

== Defeat of the Armada ==
Armada Medal, a Dutch jeton struck in Dort in 1588, showing people praying to God for divine deliverance. The text reads: Homo proponit et Deus disponit, or "Man proposes and God disposes"

The Armada was subsequently defeated by the English fleet under the English admirals Lord Howard of Effingham (later Earl of Nottingham), Sir John Hawkins and Sir Francis Drake. The Armada was unable to pick up the Spanish army waiting in the Netherlands, and was forced instead to flee Northwards, around the East Coast of Britain, and attempted to return to Spain by sailing around the North coast of Scotland and around Ireland. Here, in addition to the usually rough seas, the ships ran into a heavy storm, sometimes described as one of the most northern hurricanes on record. Already in poor condition after an extended period at sea, many ships were sunk, or driven onto the Irish coast and wrecked. Over 50 ships were lost and the Armada ceased to be an effective force. The ships that returned to Spain were in poor condition and their crews weakened and diseased from the long journey.

== Aftermath ==
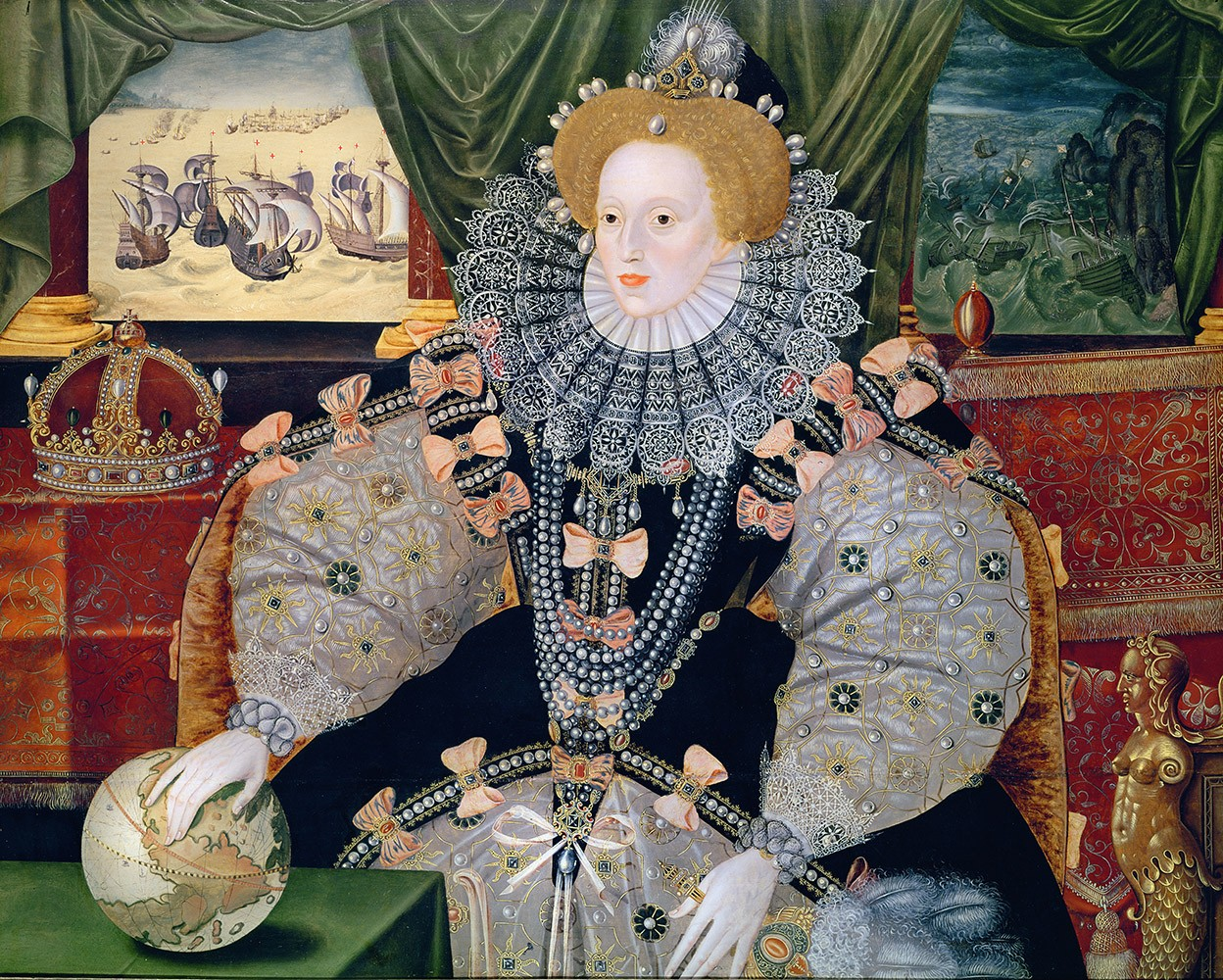
Portrait of Elizabeth made to commemorate the defeat of the Spanish Armada (1588). In the background, the ships of the Armada are depicted on a storm-tossed sea.

Phillip's plans to invade England had been effectively quashed, the weather having played a large part. A later legend had him declared, "I sent my ships to fight against the English, not against the elements". The Spanish-English conflict was viewed all over Europe as a contest between Catholicism and Protestantism. The unlikely victory was viewed by the English as being proof of God's support for the Protestant cause, church services in thanks were held across the country and a number of medals were produced in England and the Dutch Republic to commemorate the event.

One of the most famous, made in the Dutch Republic, bore an inscription in Latin: Flavit Jehovah et Dissipati Sunt, lit. 'Jehovah blew and they were scattered' (with the word "Jehovah", written in Hebrew: יהוה, the Tetragrammaton). It is a reference to the Book of Job 4:9–11 in the Vulgate Bible: Latin: flante Deo perisse, et spiritu iræ ejus esse consumptos. Rugitus leonis, et vox leænæ, et dentes catulorum leonum contriti sunt. Tigris periit, eo quod non haberet prædam, et catuli leonis dissipati sunt; the Elizabethan Bishops' Bible translation of which runs:

With the blast of God they perishe, with the breath of his nostrels are they consumed away. The roring of the lion, and the voyce of the lion, and the teeth of the lions whelpes are pulled out. The lion perisheth for lake of pray, & the lions whelpes are scattered abrode.

The inscription accompanied a scene of a fleet of ships on a stormy sea. The reverse displayed a church building, symbolizing the Protestant Church, remaining unmoved in a storm (symbolizing the Armada invasion), with the Latin inscription: Allidor Non Laedor, lit. 'I am assailed but not injured'. Other medals included one that showed a wrecked galleon, and on the obverse some people praying.

Another large silver medal displayed a scene of some sinking ships on one side; on the other it satirized the Pope, King Phillip, and other clerics and rulers, who were shown with bandages over their eyes, and with their feet resting on a bed of sharp spikes. Yet another, used by England as a Naval Reward medal, depicts a portrait of Queen Elizabeth, surrounded by her titles, and featuring on the reverse, an island on the sea with a large bay tree (supposedly immune to lightning) towering over a town, bearing the Latin inscription: Non Ipsa Pericula Tangunt, lit. 'not even dangers touch it'.

Other medals used the Latin term for God, in the phrase Latin phrase: Flavit Deus et Dissipati Sunt, lit. 'God blew and they were scattered', and featured on the obverse the biblical phrase of Matthew 2:18:

In Rama was there a voyce hearde, lamentation, wepyng, & great mournyng, Rachel weping [for] her children, and woulde not be comforted, because they were not

Queen Elizabeth is supposed to have awarded a medal to her admirals, bearing the phrase. The alternative term, "The Protestant Wind" is sometimes used, again to emphasise the divine nature of the victory.

The phrase, along with Elizabeth's speech to the troops at Tilbury, has become part of the popular mythology of the event, in a similar way that England expects that every man will do his duty has become a part of the national heritage after the Battle of Trafalgar. Altered and abbreviated versions of the phrase exist, such as God blew and they were scattered or God breathed and they were scattered.

== See also ==
- Kamikaze (typhoon)
