= Joan Barry (British actress) =

British actress (1903–1989)

- photo by Dorothy Wilding
- Born: Ina Florence Marshman Bell; 5 November 1903; Carlisle, England
- Died: 10 April 1989 (aged 85); Marbella, Spain
- Occupation: Actress
- Years active: 1922–1932
- Spouses: Henry Hampson (m. 1934; div. 1936) Henry Frederick Tiarks III (m. 1936)
- Children: 2, including Henrietta Russell, Duchess of Bedford

Joan Barry (born Ina Florence Marshman Bell; 5 November 1903 – 10 April 1989) was a British actress, whose career straddled the development of talkies.

== Family ==
She was the daughter of Francis Marshman Bell, who went to Sydney, Cumberland County, New South Wales, and wife Norah Cavanagh.

== Biography ==
Born in Carlisle, Cumberland, although some sources claim she was born three years earlier in London, she had her first role at the age of 15. Barry appeared at St James's Theatre, London when seventeen. She memorably dubbed the voice of Anny Ondra in the early Alfred Hitchcock thriller Blackmail (1929). The limited sound technology available at the time meant that Barry had to dub the Czechoslovak actress in real time as she performed the role.

Barry appeared on-screen for Hitchcock in Rich and Strange two years later. She continued to appear in a mixture of leading and top supporting roles (most memorably in Rome Express (1932)) until she retired to start a family.

== Marriages and issue ==
She retired from the screen after her first marriage in Merthyr Tydfil, Glamorgan, Wales in 1934. On 3 October 1936 she married her second husband, Henry Frederick Tiarks III (Woodheath, Chislehurst, London, Middlesex, 8 September 1900 – Marbella, 2 July 1995), son of banker Frank Cyril Tiarks and himself a wealthy merchant banker with Schroders also marrying for the second time, having married firstly on 27 April 1930 and divorced in 1936 to Lady Millicent Olivia Mary Taylour of the Marquesses of Headfort, who died on 24 December 1975. They had two children. One of them, Edward Henry Tiarks, died when he was only six months old in 1943. The other, Henrietta Joan Tiarks, married Robin Russell, the Marquess of Tavistock, who eventually became the 14th Duke of Bedford. She is now Henrietta, Dowager Duchess of Bedford.

== Filmography ==
| Year | Title | Role | Notes |
|---|---|---|---|
| 1922 | The Card | Nellie Cotterill | |
| 1923 | Hutch Stirs 'em Up | Joan | |
| 1925 | The Happy Ending | Molly Craddock | |
| 1928 | The Rising Generation | Peggy Kent | |
| 1929 | Blackmail | Alice White | Voice, Uncredited |
| 1929 | Atlantic | Betty Tate-Hughes | |
| 1931 | The Outsider | Lalage Sturdee | |
| 1931 | A Man of Mayfair | Grace Irving | |
| 1931 | Rich and Strange | Emily Hill | |
| 1932 | Ebb Tide | Mary | |
| 1932 | Women Who Play | Fay | |
| 1932 | The First Mrs. Fraser | Elsie Fraser | |
| 1932 | Sally Bishop | Sally Bishop | |
| 1932 | Rome Express | Mrs. Maxted | |
| 1933 | Mrs. Dane's Defence | Felicia / Mrs. Dane | (final film role) |
