= Robert Salmon (inventor) =

English inventor (1763–1821)

Robert Salmon (1763 – 6 October 1821) was an architect and inventor of agricultural implements. He was employed on the Duke of Bedford's estate in Woburn, Bedfordshire, England, in the late 18th and early 19th centuries.

== Early career ==
Salmon was born in 1763 in Stratford-upon-Avon, Warwickshire, the youngest son of William Salmon, a carpenter and builder. At an early age he entered the service of an attorney named Grey, residing near Leicester Fields, who aided him in his education. He soon displayed remarkable mechanical ability, and, being fond of music, made for himself a violin and other musical instruments.

A few years later, he obtained the appointment of clerk of works under the architect Henry Holland, and was engaged in the rebuilding of Carlton House, London. In 1790 he was employed under Holland at Woburn Abbey in Bedfordshire, where he attracted the notice of Francis Russell, 5th Duke of Bedford, and became the Duke's resident architect and mechanic in 1794.

== At Woburn ==
Salmon effected many reforms in the management of the Duke's property. From 1795 he designed Park Farm, Speedwell Farm and many other buildings on the Russell estates. The Duke was interested in the agrarian revolution of the day: Park Farm, designed in 1795, of which the first set of buildings were completed in 1797, was regarded as a model farm, using the latest machinery and techniques. The Duke started in Woburn annual exhibitions of sheep-shearing, and during these events Salmon's work in improving agricultural implements attracted much attention.

In 1797 the Society of Arts awarded him thirty guineas for a chaff-cutting engine, which was the parent of later chaffcutters. In 1801 Salmon exhibited his "Bedfordshire Drill", which became the model for succeeding drills. In 1803 he showed a new design of plough. In 1804 he brought out a "scuffler", or cultivator, and two years later he exhibited a self-raking reaping machine, which was described in 1808 in Bell's Weekly Messenger. In 1814 Salmon patented the first haymaking machine.

He received at various times silver medals from the Society of Arts for surgical instruments, a canal lock, a weighing machine, a humane mantrap, and a system of earthwalls. John Russell, 6th Duke of Bedford (who succeeded his brother the 5th Duke in 1802) conferred on Salmon the stewardship of his Chenies estate, so that he might improve the system of plantation. He paid great attention to the proper method of pruning forest trees, for which he invented an apparatus, and made experiments to determine the best method of seasoning timber.

== Retirement ==
In September 1821, in failing health, Salmon retired to Lambeth. He died within a month of his retirement, while on a visit to Woburn, on 6 October 1821. He was buried two days later in Woburn Church, where the 6th Duke of Bedford placed a tablet commemorating his "unwearied zeal and disinterested integrity".
