= Boaz and Ruth (paintings) =

Painting series by Rembrandt

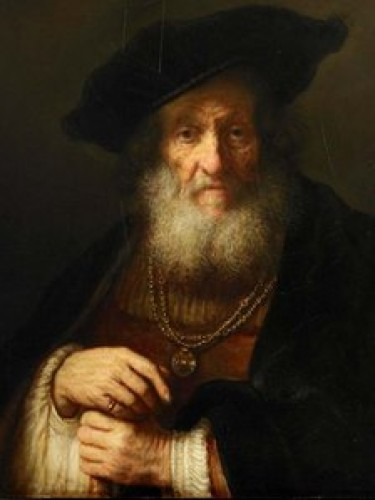
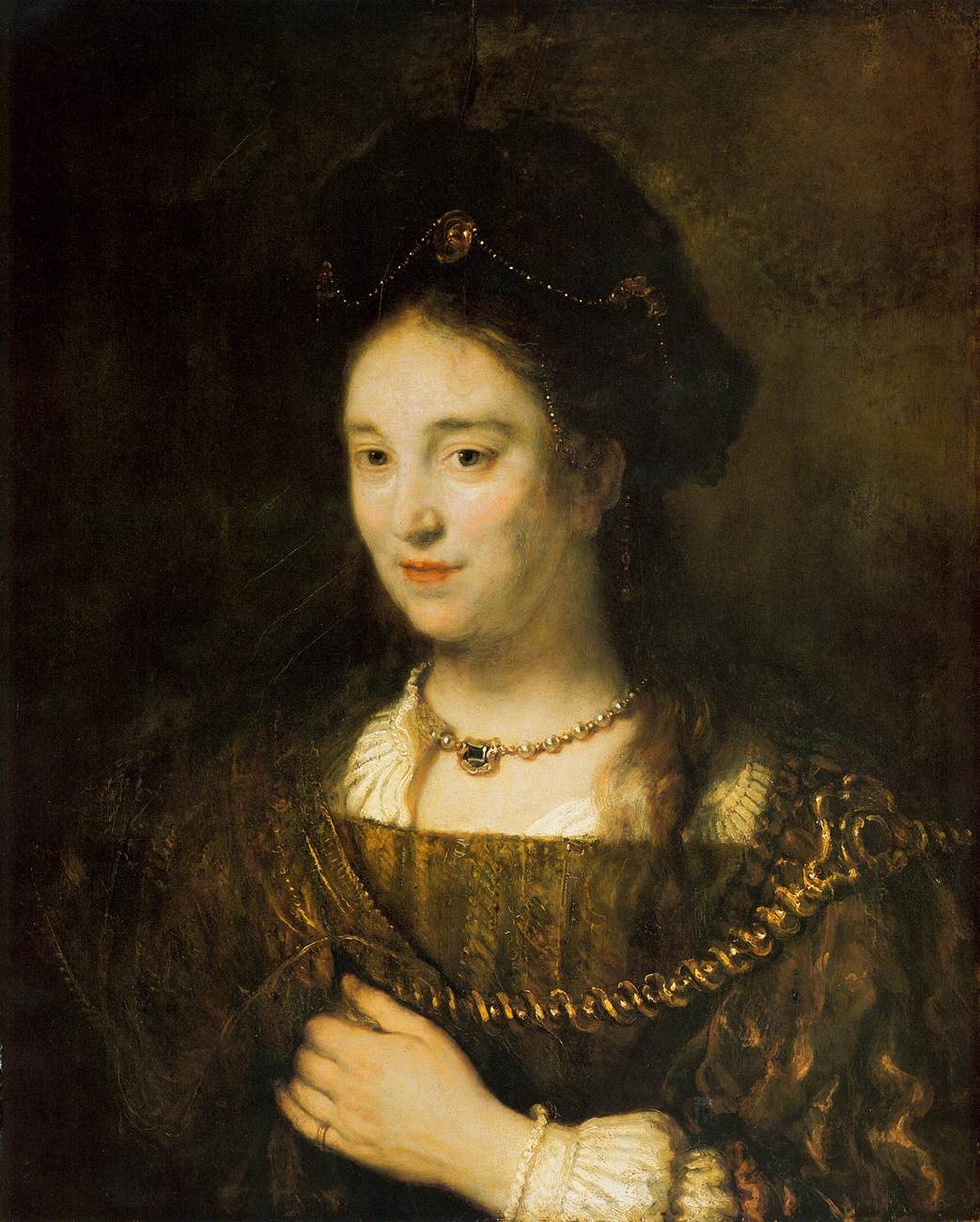
Boaz and Ruth

Boaz and Ruth are a pair of paintings by Rembrandt dated to 1643 and thought to represent the painter and his wife as the biblical characters Boaz and Ruth.

Ruth is in the possession of the Berlin Gemäldegalerie. Boaz, however, is in the collection at Woburn Abbey where it was hung high on a wall and only identified as a Rembrandt in 2012.

== See also ==
- List of paintings by Rembrandt
