= A Man of Mayfair =

1931 film directed by Louis Mercanton

- Swedish poster
- Directed by: Louis Mercanton
- Written by: Eliot Crawshay-Williams; Hugh Perceval
- Produced by: Walter Morosco
- Starring: Jack Buchanan; Joan Barry; Warwick Ward; Nora Swinburne
- Music by: Percival Mackey
- Production company: Paramount British Pictures
- Distributed by: Paramount British Pictures
- Release date: 9 May 1932
- Running time: 83 minutes
- Country: United Kingdom
- Language: English

A Man of Mayfair is a 1932 British musical comedy film directed by Louis Mercanton and starring Jack Buchanan, Joan Barry and Warwick Ward.

== Production ==
It was made at British and Dominions Elstree Studios by the British subsidiary of Paramount Pictures. he film's sets were designed by the art director Holmes Paul. Buchanan had recently made the hit Monte Carlo for Paramount in Hollywood and came to Britain to appear in this film which Paramount put larger resources into rather than other American companies who produced quota quickies. Shortly afterwards he was signed up by Herbert Wilcox and appeared in several films for him during the decade beginning with Goodnight, Vienna (1932).

== Cast ==
- Jack Buchanan as Lord William
- Joan Barry as Grace Irving
- Warwick Ward as Ferdinand Barclay
- Nora Swinburne as Elaine Barclay
- Ellaline Terriss as Old Grace
- Lilian Braithwaite as Lady Kingsland
- Cyril Raymond as Charles
- Charles Quatermaine as Dalton
- Sebastian Smith as Macpherson
- J. Fisher White as Wilson

== Bibliography ==
- Low, Rachael. Filmmaking in 1930s Britain. George Allen & Unwin, 1985.
- Wood, Linda. British Films, 1927-1939. British Film Institute, 1986.
