= Kamikaze (typhoon) =

Historic windstorms that stopped Mongol fleets (1274, 1281)

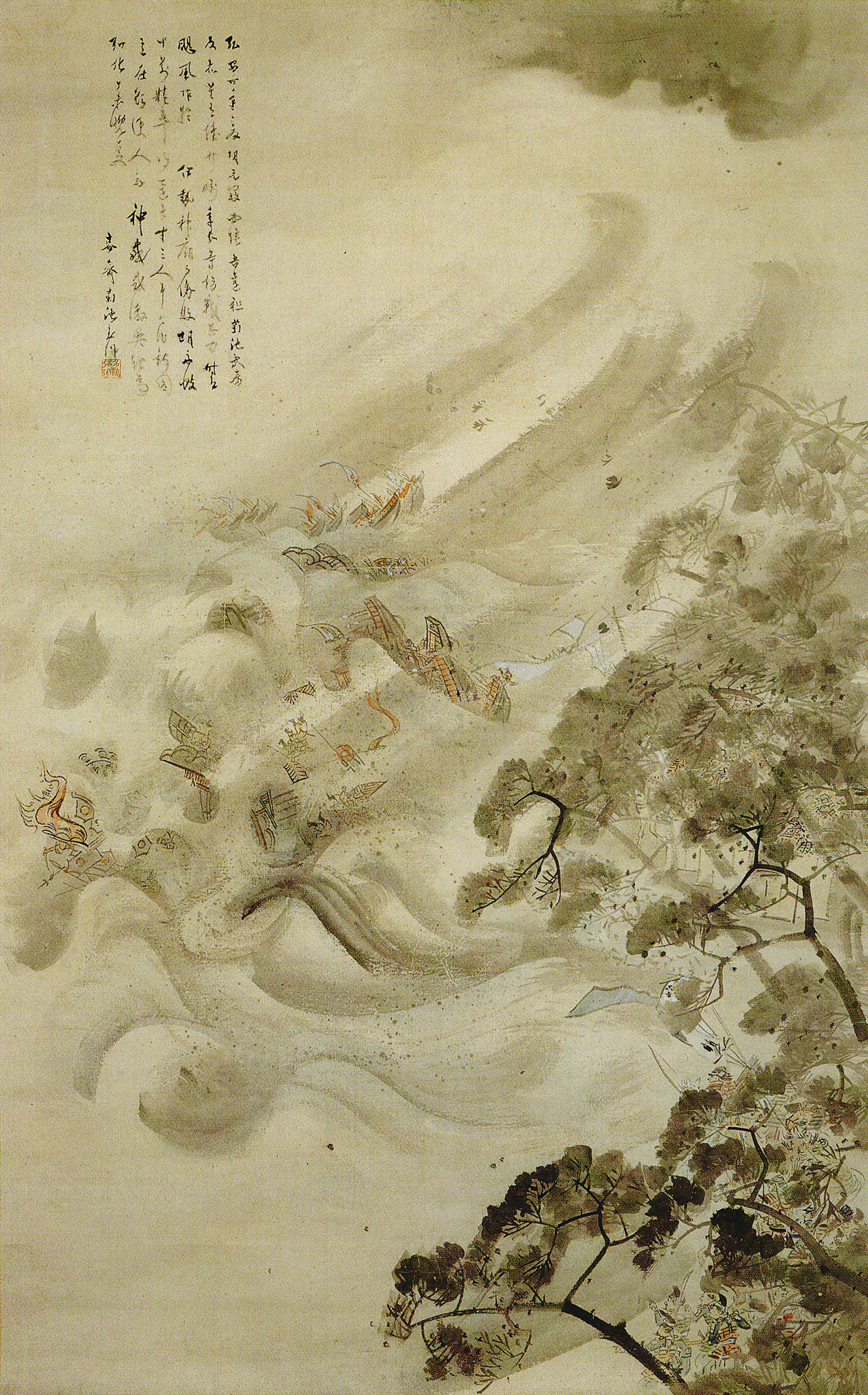
The Mongol fleet destroyed in a typhoon, ink and water on paper, by Kikuchi Yōsai, 1847

The kamikaze (Japanese: 神風, lit. 'divine wind') were winds or storms that are said to have saved Japan from two Mongol fleets under Kublai Khan. These fleets attacked Japan in 1274 and again in 1281. Due to the growth of Zen Buddhism among Samurai at the time, these were the first events where the typhoons were described as "divine wind" as much by their timing as by their force. Since Man'yōshū, the word kamikaze has been used as a Makurakotoba of waka introducing Ise Grand Shrine.

The term "kamikaze" is the native Japanese kun'yomi reading of the characters, and the main reading of them that was used more throughout history was the on'yomi (Sinitic) "shinpu".

== History ==
The latter fleet, composed of "more than four thousand ships bearing nearly 140,000 men", is said to have been the largest attempted naval invasion in history whose scale was only recently eclipsed in modern times by the D-Day invasion of allied forces into Normandy in 1944. The size of the fleet is often disputed by modern historians, however.

== Events ==
In the first invasion, the Mongols successfully conquered the Japanese settlements on Tsushima and Iki islands. When they landed on Hakata Bay, however, they met fierce resistance by the armies of samurai clans. Despite conquering several miles inland, resistance and/or resupply caused them to withdraw to their ships. In the midst of the withdrawal, they were hit by a typhoon. Most of their ships sank and many soldiers drowned.

The first incident took place in autumn 1274 when a Mongol fleet of 500 to 900 ships carrying 30,000 to 40,000 men attacked Japan. While in Hakata Bay, Kyushu, a typhoon hit the fleet. An estimated 13,000 men drowned, around one-third of the ships sank, and the rest were damaged.

During the time period between the first and second invasion, the Japanese built the Genkō Bōrui, a stone wall roughly 2 meters wide and 2 meters tall spanning around 20 kilometers along the shore of Hakata Bay, to protect themselves from future assaults.

Seven years later, the Mongols returned. Unable to find any suitable landing beaches due to the walls, the fleet stayed afloat for months and depleted their supplies as they searched for an area to land. After months of being exposed to the elements, the fleet was destroyed by a great typhoon, which the Japanese called "kamikaze" (divine wind). The Mongols never attacked Japan again, and more than 70,000 men were said to have been captured.

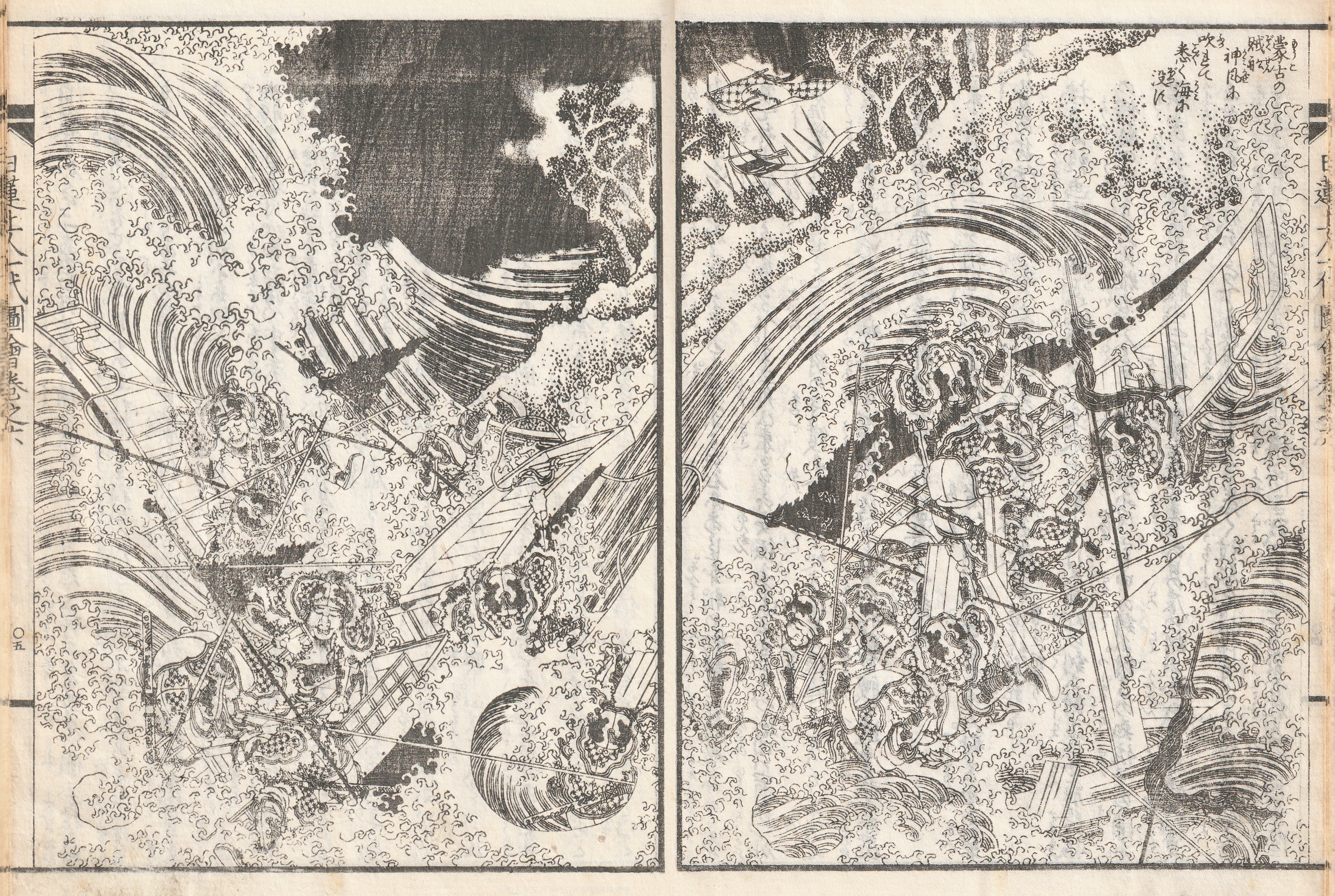
Illustration by Katsushika Isai (1821–1880), the disciple of Hokusai

The second fleet was larger, comprising two forces with an estimated total of 4,400 ships and 140,000 men, greatly outnumbering the Japanese soldiers, who had an estimated 40,000 samurai and other fighting men. The typhoon led to the death of at least half the men, and only a few hundred vessels survived. Following the storm, most survivors were killed by the Japanese. This event is considered "one of the largest and most disastrous attempts at a naval invasion in history."

== In myth ==
In popular Japanese myths at the time, the god Raijin was the god who turned the storms against the Mongols. Other variations say that the gods Fūjin, Ryūjin or Hachiman caused the destructive kamikaze.

== As a metaphor ==
The name given to the storm, kamikaze, was later used during World War II as nationalist propaganda for suicide attacks by Japanese pilots. The metaphor meant that the pilots were to be the "Divine Wind" that would again sweep the enemy from the seas. This use of kamikaze has come to be the common meaning of the word in the English lexicon.

== See also ==
- Act of God
- Battle of Bun'ei
- Battle of Kōan
- Boreas
- Divine providence
- Miracle of the House of Brandenburg
- Mongol invasions of Japan
- Protestant Wind
- Tornado
