= Woburn Abbey =

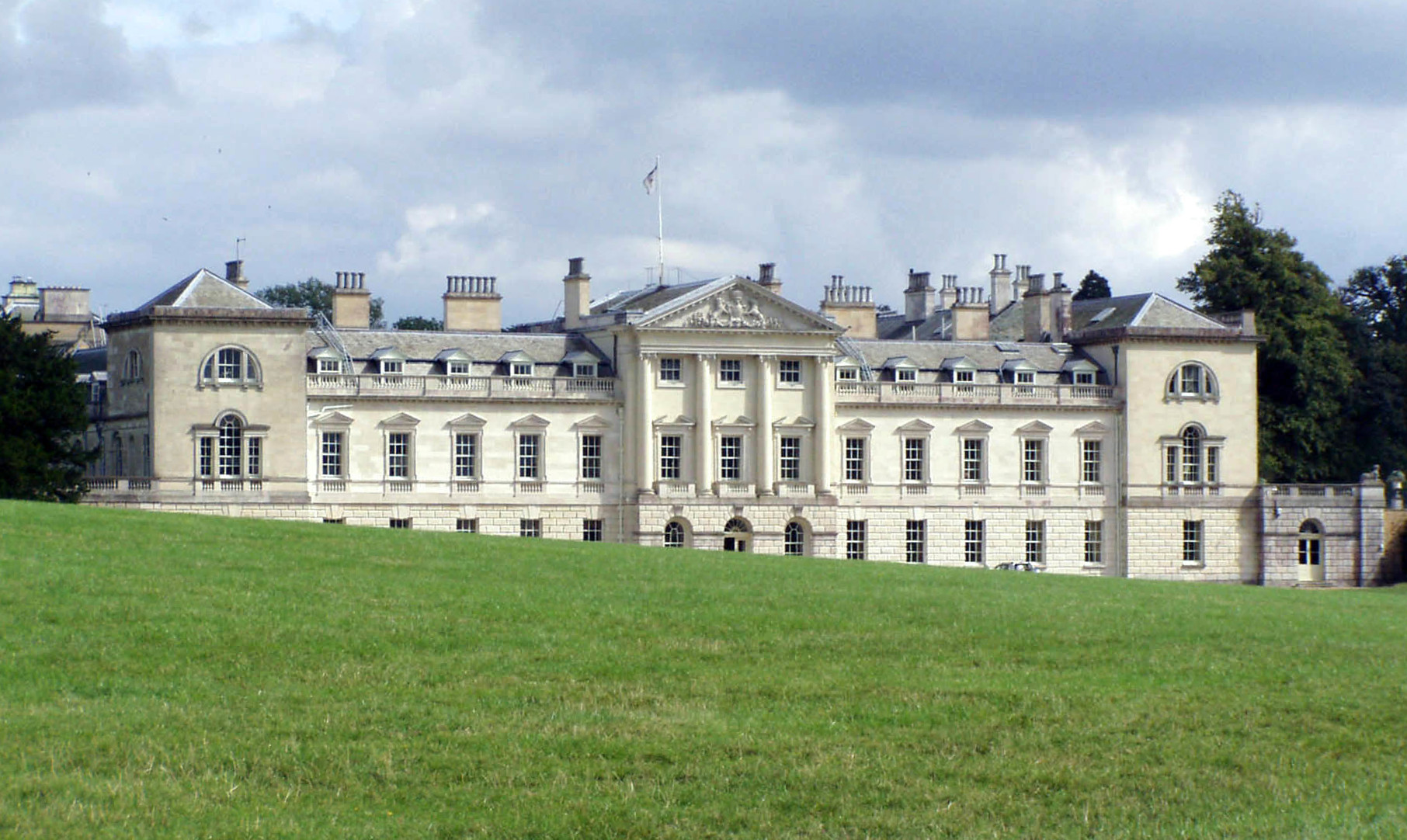
- The west front of Woburn Abbey

General information
- Type: Stately home
- Location: Woburn, Bedfordshire, England
- Coordinates: 51.9831°N 0.5968°W
- Owner: Duke of Bedford

Listed Building – Grade I
- Designated: 22 October 1952
- Reference no.: 1114006

National Register of Historic Parks and Gardens
- Designated: 30 November 1986
- Reference no.: 1000364

Woburn Abbey (/ˈwoʊbərn/), (Note: Locally until c.1960 referring to the Village or Abbey /wuːbərn/) occupying the east of the village of Woburn, Bedfordshire, England, is a country house, the family seat of the Duke of Bedford. Although it is still a family home to the current duke, it is open on specified days to visitors, along with the diverse estate surrounding it, including the historic landscape gardens and deer park (by Humphry Repton), as well as more recently added attractions including Woburn Safari Park, a miniature railway and a garden/visitor centre. It was built by William Russell, 1st Baron Russell of Thornhaugh.

== Pre-20th century ==
=== Monastic origins ===
Woburn Abbey, comprising Woburn Park and its buildings, was set out and founded as a Cistercian abbey in 1145. The Cistercian community was dissolved by Henry VIII in 1538.

=== Early Russell family rebuilding projects ===
In 1547 the estate became the seat of the Russell family and the Dukes of Bedford, Around 1630, Francis Russell, 4th Earl of Bedford undertook the first rebuilding, demolishing or incorporating original abbey building and built the manor house on the monastic site, although the name Abbey was retained.

=== Eighteenth Century ===
The second rebuilding occurred under architects Henry Flitcroft and John Sanderson between 1747 and 1761.

In April 1786 John Adams and Thomas Jefferson, both future Presidents of the United States, visited Woburn Abbey and other notable houses in the area. After visiting them Adams wrote in his diary "Stowe, Hagley, and Blenheim, are superb; Woburn, Caversham, and the Leasowes are beautiful. Wotton is both great and elegant, though neglected". However he was also damning about the means used to finance the large estates, and he did not think that the embellishments to the landscape made by the owners of the great country houses would suit the more rugged American countryside.

Further rework undertaken between 1787 and 1790 was directed by Henry Holland.

== Second World War ==
Visiting Woburn Abbey in March 1939, the MP and diarist Henry Channon described the well-kept-up "feudal magnificance" of the estate shortly before the outbreak of war. This included more than twenty drawing rooms, thirty cars and whole rooms devoted each to collections of Joshua Reynolds, Canalettos and Van Dyck paintings.

From 1941 Woburn Abbey was the headquarters of the secretive Political Warfare Executive (PWE) which had its London offices at the BBC's Bush House.

== 1945 to 1970s ==
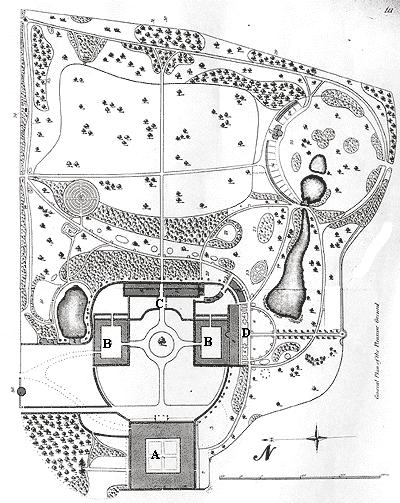
Layout of Woburn before partial demolition. Building 'C' and the upper half of building 'A' (the east part of the main western building) were demolished.

Following World War II, dry rot was discovered and the east wing of the Abbey was subsequently demolished. When the 12th Duke died in 1953, his son the 13th Duke was exposed to death duties of $14 million and what remained of the Abbey was semi-derelict. Instead of handing the family estates over to the National Trust, he kept ownership and opened the Abbey to the public for the first time in 1955. It soon gained in popularity and in its first ten years, it had ticket sales of $11 million, helping to pay off much of the death duties. Other amusements were added, including Woburn Safari Park on the grounds of the Abbey in 1970. Asked about the unfavourable comments by other aristocrats when he turned the family home into a safari park, the 13th Duke said, "I do not relish the scorn of the peerage, but it is better to be looked down on than overlooked."

== 1970s to present ==
The 13th Duke, Ian Russell, moved to Monte Carlo in 1974. His son Robin, who enjoyed the courtesy title Marquess of Tavistock, ran the Abbey with his wife in his father's absence. In the early 1990s, the Marquess and The Tussauds Group planned to turn the Abbey into a large theme park with the help of John Wardley, creator of the roller coasters "Nemesis" and "Oblivion". However, Tussauds bought Alton Towers and built one there instead. From 1999 to 2002, the Marquess and the Marchioness, the former Henrietta Joan Tiarks, were the subjects of the Tiger Aspect Productions reality series Country House in three series, totalling 29 episodes, which aired on BBC Two. It detailed the daily life and the business of running the Abbey. The Marquess of Tavistock became the 14th Duke on the death of his father in November 2002 in Santa Fe, New Mexico, United States. The 14th Duke was the briefest holder of the Dukedom and died in June 2003. On the death of the 14th Duke, his son Andrew became the 15th Duke, and he continues his father's work in running the Woburn Abbey Estate. The building is a Grade I listed building.

== Collection ==
The art collection of the Duke of Bedford is extensive and encompasses a wide range of western artwork. The holdings comprise some 250 paintings, including works by Rubens, Van Dyck, Canaletto and Velasquez. Moreover, the collection encompasses examples of the finest manufacturers of furniture, French and English in many periods, and a diverse collection of porcelain and silverware.

=== Paintings ===
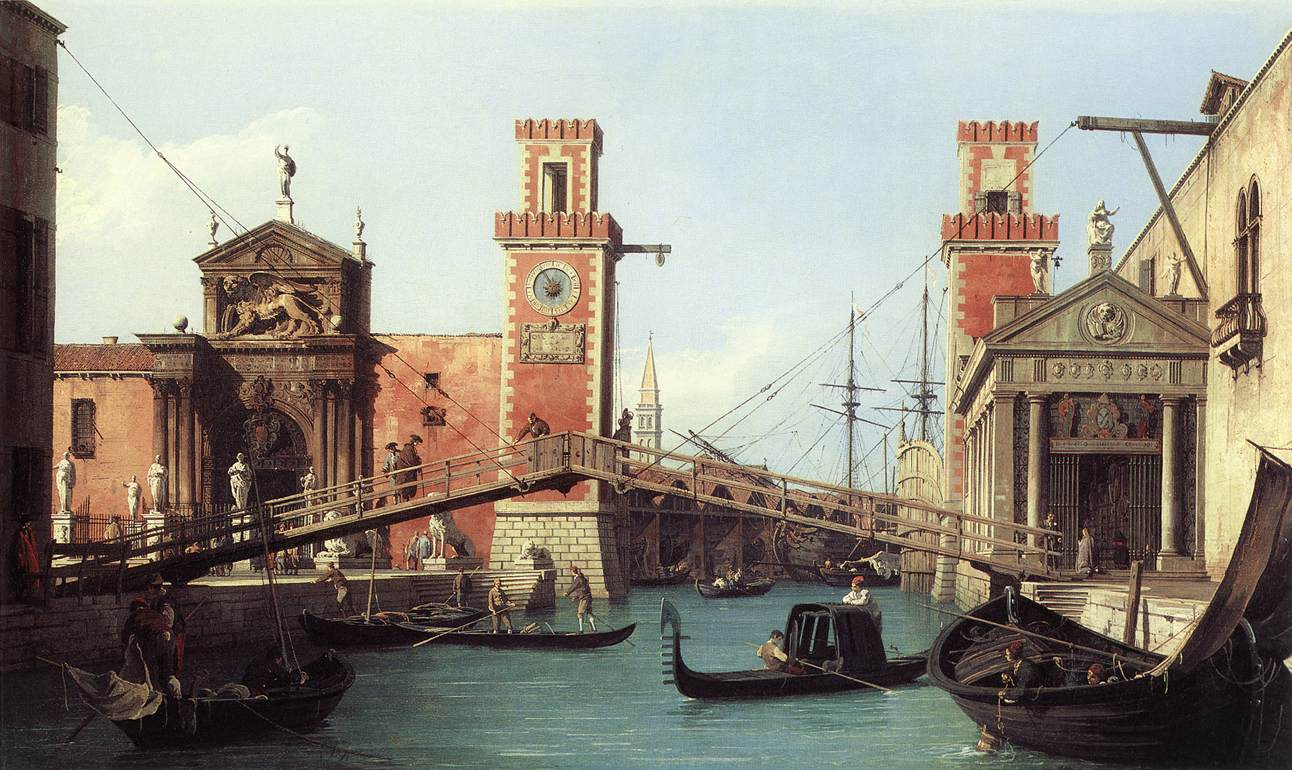
View of the entrance to the Arsenal, Canaletto, 1732

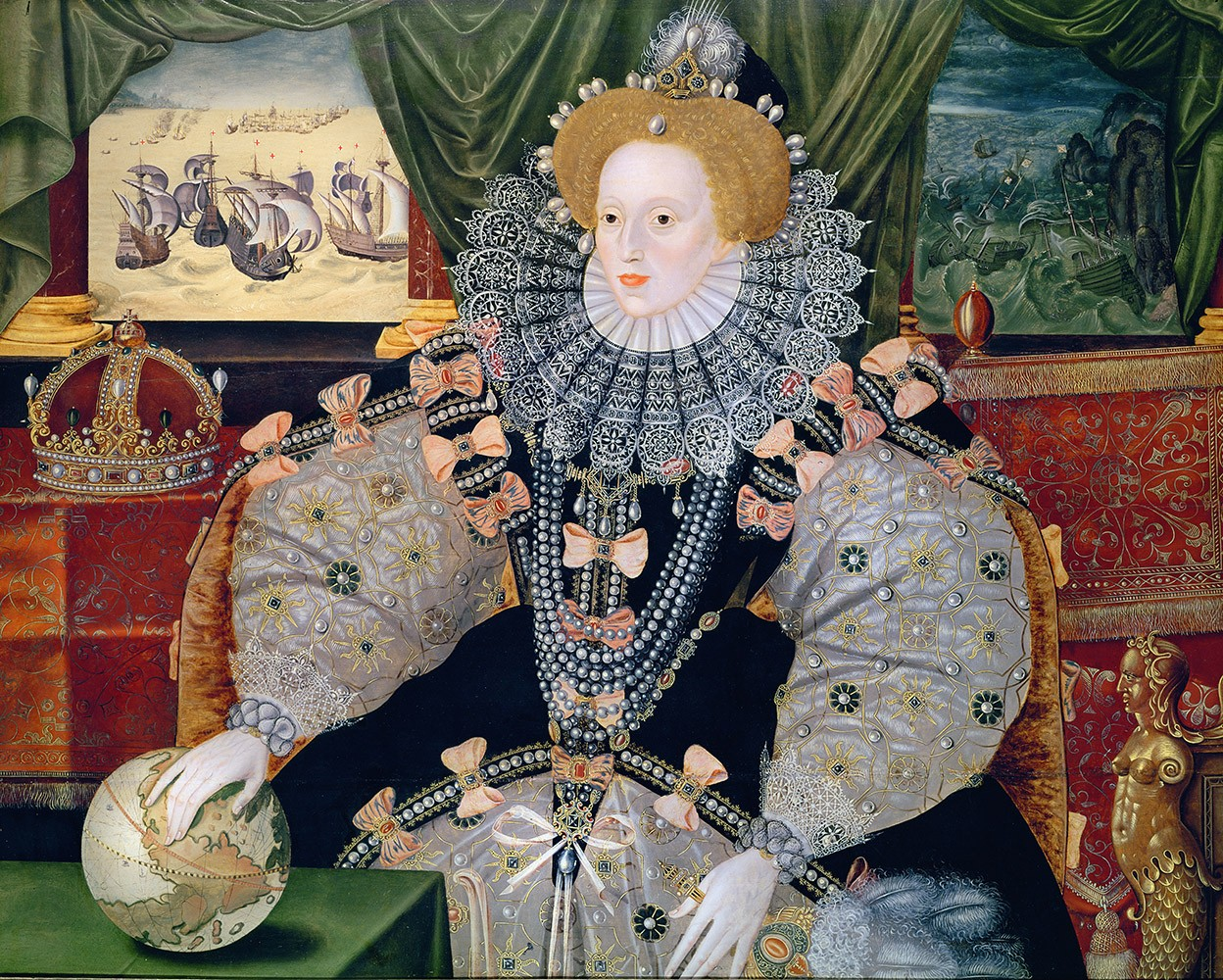
The Armada Portrait of Elizabeth I, 1588?

Dutch School

- Asselyn, Jan – 1 painting
- Cuyp, Aelbert Jacobsz – 5 paintings
- Delen, Dirk van – 1 painting
- Flinck, Govert – 1 painting
- Goyen, Jan van – 1 painting
- Potter, Paulus – 2 paintings (A Hawking Party, 1653)
- Rembrandt, Harmenszoon van Rijn – 2 paintings (Boaz, 1643 and Self-portrait, 1640)
- Ruisdael, Jacob van – 2 paintings
- Steen, Jan – 2 paintings
- Velde, Willem van de Velde (the Younger) – 1 painting
- Werff, Adrian van der – 1 painting

English School

- Gainsborough, Thomas – 1 painting
- Gheeraerts, Marcus (the Younger) – 2 paintings
- Hayter, Sir George – 4 paintings
- Hoppner, John – 2 paintings
- Knapton, George – 1 painting
- Landseer, Edwin Henry – 2 paintings
- Reynolds, Joshua – 12 paintings
- George Gower – (The Armada Portrait of Elizabeth I, 1588?, one of the greatest English portraits in existence)

Flemish School

- Critz, John de – 1 painting
- Dyck, Anthony van – 10 paintings (Aubert Lemire, Dean of Antwerp, c. 1630)
- Eworth, Hans – 1 painting

French School

- Bercham, Nicholas – 1 painting
- Lorrain, Claude (known as Claude Gellée) – 2 paintings
- Lefebvre, Claude – 1 painting
- Loo, Carl van – 1 painting (Portrait of Louis XV)
- Poussin, Nicolas – 2 paintings
- Vernet, Claude Joseph – 2 paintings

German School

- Holbein, Hans (the Younger) – 1 painting

Italian School

- Batoni, Pompeo – 1 painting
- Canaletto – 24 paintings (View of the Entrance to the Venetian Arsenal, c. 1732 – one of Canaletto's greatest works)
- Ricci, Sebastiano – 1 painting
- Salvi, Giovanni (Il Sassoferrato) – 2 paintings

Spanish School

- Murillo, Bartolomé Esteban – 1 painting
- Velázquez, Diego – 1 painting (Portrait of Admiral Pulido Pareja, Captain General of the Armada Fleet of New Spain)

== See also ==
- List of monastic houses in Bedfordshire
- Woburn Place, Woburn Walk, Woburn Square in Central London
- Robert Salmon (1763–1821), architect of many buildings on the Duke of Bedford's estate

== Notes and references ==
Notes
