= Henrietta Russell, Duchess of Bedford =

British landowner and horse breeder

Her Grace The Dowager Duchess of Bedford
- Born: Henrietta Joan Tiarks; 5 March 1940 (age 86); London, England
- Spouse: Robin Russell, 14th Duke of Bedford (m. 1961; died 2003)
- Issue: Andrew Russell, 15th Duke of Bedford; Lord Robin Russell; Lord James Russell
- Parents: Henry Frederick Tiarks III; Joan Barry

Henrietta Russell, Dowager Duchess of Bedford (born Henrietta Joan Tiarks; 5 March 1940) is a landowner and horse breeder, and the widow of Robin Russell, 14th Duke of Bedford, with whom she lived at Woburn Abbey. Until her husband succeeded to the Dukedom in 2002, she was better known as the Marchioness of Tavistock.

== Family background ==
Henrietta Joan Tiarks was born in London, on 5 March 1940, daughter of Henry Frederick Tiarks III (Chislehurst, London, 8 September 1900 – Marbella, 2 July 1995), a wealthy merchant banker with Schroders, and wife (3 October 1936) Ina Florence Marshman Bell (Carlisle, Cumbria, 5 November 1903 – Marbella, 10 April 1989), an actress known as Joan Barry. Her parents married on 3 October 1936; both having been married previously, he on 27 April 1930, div. 1936, to Lady Millicent Olivia Mary Taylour, daughter of the 4th Marquess of Headfort (? - 24 December 1975) and she in Merthyr Tydfil, Glamorgan, Wales, in October / December 1919 to Henry Hampson.

She is a granddaughter of Frank Cyril Tiarks and a relative of Mark Phillips.

== Marriage and issue ==
She married the then Marquess of Tavistock, Robin Russell, on 20 June 1961 at St Clement Danes in London, thereby becoming the Marchioness of Tavistock. He succeeded his father, becoming the 14th Duke of Bedford, on 25 October 2002, at which point Henrietta became Duchess of Bedford. They had three sons:

- Andrew Ian Henry Russell, 15th Duke of Bedford (b. 30 March 1962)
- Lord Robin Loel Hastings Russell (b. 12 August 1963)
- Lord James Edward Herbrand Russell (b. 11 February 1975)

Her husband died on 13 June 2003 aged 63 as the result of a stroke. As with other ranks of nobility, she retains her late husbands title. They had already handed over control of Woburn Abbey to their eldest son Andrew, then Lord Howland, in 2001. She only became officially "Dowager Duchess" after the death of her stepmother-in-law, Nicole Russell, Duchess of Bedford, in 2012.

Since her husband's death, Henrietta, Duchess of Bedford has lived primarily in New Zealand, where she raises horses and has homes in Matamata, Central Otago, and Auckland.

== Media appearances ==
As Henrietta Tiarks, she made four appearances on the BBC television record review series Juke Box Jury in 1960. As Marchioness of Tavistock, she made one more appearance on Juke Box Jury in 1964, and other television appearances included Call My Bluff and Crufts.

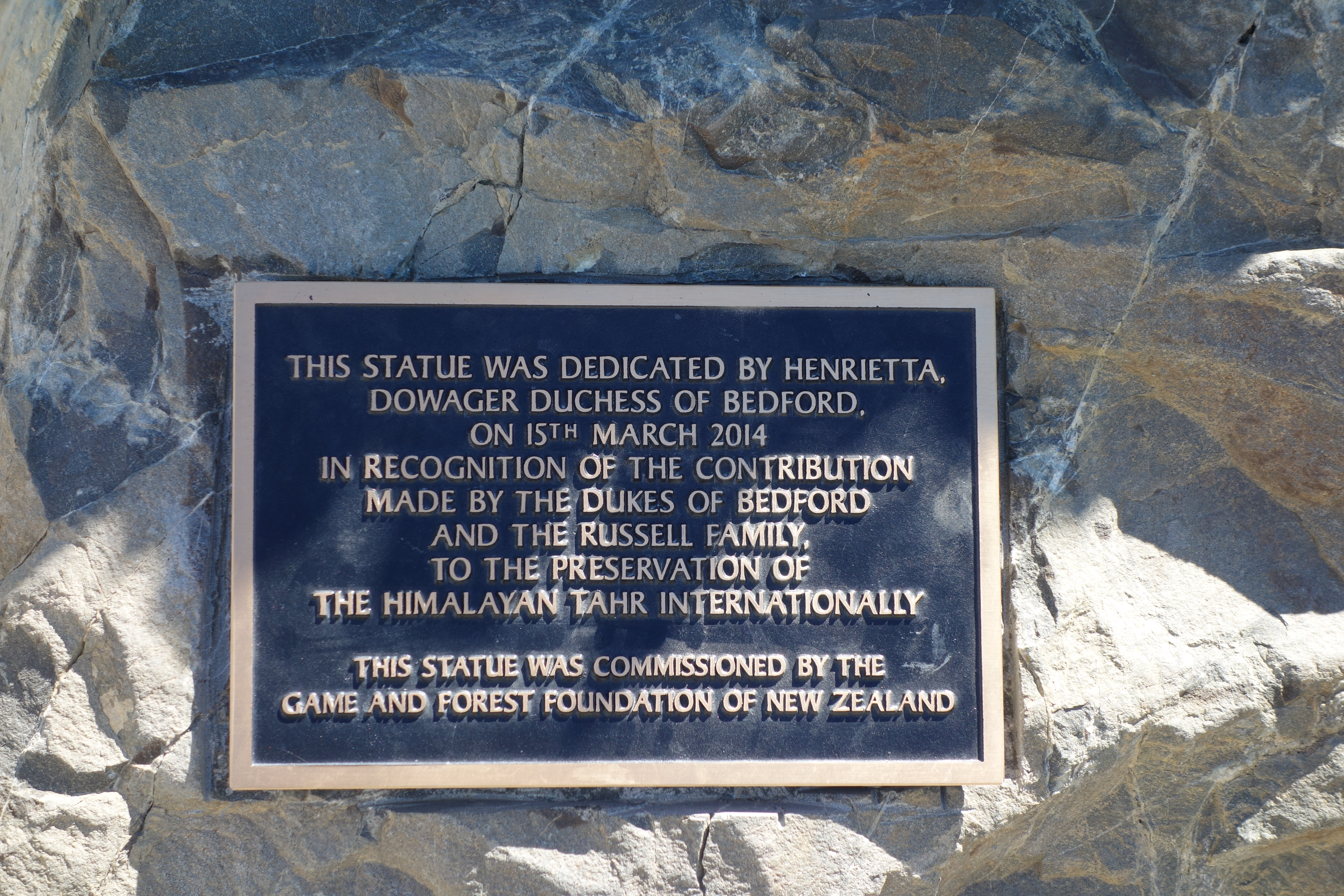
Plaque of the Lake Pukaki tahr sculpture

The Duke and Duchess appeared in three series of the BBC Two reality television programme Country House, screened from 1999 to 2002 detailing daily life at Woburn Abbey, the Bedfords' ancestral home in Bedfordshire, England.

Her autobiography, Chance to Live, was published in 1991, and she appeared as a castaway on the BBC Radio programme Desert Island Discs on 3 May 1992.

The 11th Duke of Bedford gifted Himalayan tahr to the New Zealand government in 1903 and 1909. Himalayan tahr are near-threatened in their native India and Nepal, but are so numerous in New Zealand's Southern Alps that they are hunted recreationally. A statue of a Himalayan tahr was unveiled in May 2014 at Lake Pukaki and dedicated by the Dowager Duchess of Bedford.

== Bibliography ==
- —— (1991). Chance to Live. Headline. ISBN 978-0747203537.
