= Protestant Wind =

Maritime winds that aided Protestants over Catholics

The phrase Protestant Wind has been used in more than one context, notably:

1. The storm that lashed the Spanish Armada in 1588. The wind wrecked the Spanish fleet and thus saved England from invasion by the army of Philip II of Spain. The English made a commemorative medal saying 'He blew with His winds, and they were scattered'.
2. The favourable winds that enabled William of Orange to invade England (while keeping opposing ships in port) in 1688, when King James II was deposed in the Glorious Revolution.

== See also ==
- Kamikaze (typhoon)
