= Frank Cyril Tiarks =

British banker (1874–1952)

Frank Cyril Tiarks OBE (also known as F. C. Tiarks) (9 July 1874 – 7 April 1952) was an English banker.

== Family ==
He was son of Henry Frederick Tiarks (23 December 1832 – 18 October 1911), banker, partner in J. Henry Schröder & Co. in London, and wife Agnes Morris (1840 – 5 February 1923), adopted daughter of Alexander Schlüsser, partner in J. Henry Schröder & Co. in London.

He was the grandson of Johann Gerhard Tiarks, who came from Lower Saxony and became a chaplain to the Duchess of Kent.

== Biography ==
Tiarks was educated on HMS Britannia 1887–1889, and served as midshipman in the Royal Navy 1889–1894. He resigned his commission following the death of his elder brother, to join his father in business. Among his appointments were a directorship of the Bank of England (1912–1945); a partnership in J. Henry Schröder & Co.; a partnership in the Anglo-Iranian Oil Company (1917–1948); and High Sheriff of Kent for 1927. He was created an Officer of the Most Excellent Order of the British Empire.

In the First World War he served under Sir William Reginald Hall, Director of Naval Intelligence, in Room 40 at the Admiralty as a Lieutenant and later a Lieutenant-Commander in the Royal Naval Volunteer Reserve.

Of German descent himself, like his wife, he was listed as a member of the Anglo-German Fellowship, of the British Union of Fascists but also in Hitler's 'Black Book'.

== Marriage and issue ==
Tiarks married in Hamburg, Germany, on 18 November 1899 Emmie "Emmy" Marie Franziska Brödermann (15 February 1875 – 27 July 1943), daughter of Eduard Matthias Brödermann, merchant, and wife Ramona Luisa Clara Ignacia Störzel. They had:

- Henry Frederic Tiarks (1900–1995) m. firstly Lady Millicent Taylour and divorced, m. secondly to actress Joan Barry, their daughter was Henrietta Russell (nee Tiarks), Duchess of Bedford
- Ramona Maria Clara Tiarks (1902–1991)
- Edward Mathias Tiarks (1904–1929) died in flying accident.
- Myra Emmy Tiarks (1910–2006)
- Peter Frank Tiarks MC (1910–1975) married firstly to Pamela (Silvertop) Clarke, secondly to Lady Henrietta Finch-Hatton, had issue (his will pr. London, 19 August, at £318,036)

His granddaughter, Henrietta Tiarks, The Dowager Duchess of Bedford, is the widow of the 14th Duke of Bedford. He is also first cousin thrice removed of Mark Phillips.

After his death, his will was proved at £222,830 on 8 July 1952.
