= Andrew Russell, 15th Duke of Bedford =

British nobleman and peer (born 1962)

His Grace The Duke of Bedford
- Duke of Bedford
- Tenure: 13 June 2003 – present
- Predecessor: Robin Russell, 14th Duke of Bedford
- Other titles: Lord Howland (1962–2002); Marquess of Tavistock (2002–2003)
- Born: 30 March 1962 (age 64)
- Spouse: Louise Rona Crammond (m. 2000)
- Issue: Lady Alexandra Russell; Henry Russell, Marquess of Tavistock
- Heir: Henry Russell, Marquess of Tavistock
- Parents: Robin Russell, 14th Duke of Bedford; Henrietta Tiarks

Andrew Ian Henry Russell, 15th Duke of Bedford (born 30 March 1962), is a British peer and landowner. His main estate is based at Woburn Abbey in Bedfordshire. He ranked 210 on the 2024 Sunday Times Rich List with an estimated fortune of £801 million.

== Life ==
The eldest son of Robin Russell, 14th Duke of Bedford, and his wife, Henrietta Tiarks, Bedford was educated at Hall School, Hampstead, and Heatherdown School, near Ascot in Berkshire, followed by Harrow School and Harvard, where he received his BA degree. He was known as Lord Howland until his grandfather's death in 2002, when he adopted the courtesy title Marquess of Tavistock, previously held by his father.

He has two younger brothers, Robin and James.

On 13 June 2003 he succeeded to the dukedom of Bedford when his father suffered a fatal stroke, also becoming 15th Marquess of Tavistock, 19th Earl of Bedford, 17th Baron Russell of Thornhaugh, and 15th Baron Howland of Streatham.

== Personal life ==
On 16 October 2000, at St Margaret's Church, Westminster, Lord Howland (as he then was) married Louise Rona Crammond, a daughter of Donald Ian Crammond.

They have two children:

- Lady Alexandra Lucy Clare Russell (born 9 July 2001)
- Henry Robin Charles Russell, Marquess of Tavistock (born 7 June 2005, London)

== Styles ==
- 1962–2002: Lord Howland
- 2002–2003: Marquess of Tavistock
- Since 2003: His Grace The Duke of Bedford

Peerage of England
Preceded by Robin Russell	Duke of Bedford; 2003–present	Incumbent; Heir apparent: Henry Russell, Marquess of Tavisock
Orders of precedence in the United Kingdom
Preceded by The Duke of St. Albans	Gentlemen; The Duke of Bedford	Followed by The Duke of Devonshire
