= Robin Russell, 14th Duke of Bedford =

British peer, stockbroker and animal conservationist. (1940 – 2003)

His Grace The Duke of Bedford
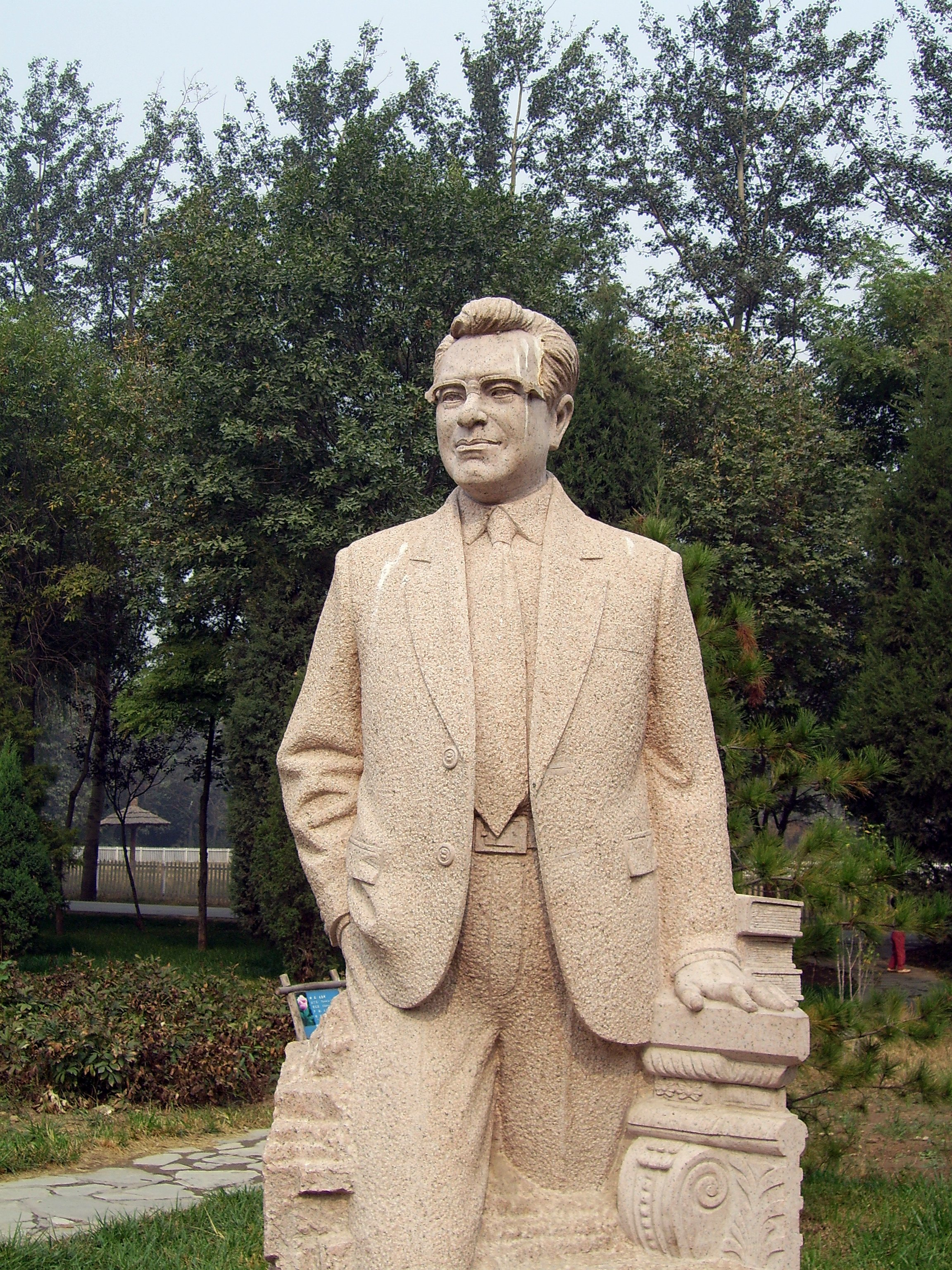
- 2005 statue of the 14th Duke of Bedford, Nan Haizi Garden, Beijing, in commemoration of his family's role in saving the Père David's deer from extinction
- Tenure: 25 October 2002 – 13 June 2003
- Successor: Andrew Russell, 15th Duke of Bedford
- Other titles: 14th Marquess of Tavistock; 18th Earl of Bedford; 18th Baron Russell; 16th Baron Russell of Thornhaugh; 14th Baron Howland
- Born: 21 January 1940; London, England
- Died: 13 June 2003 (aged 63); London, England
- Spouse: Henrietta Joan Tiarks (m. 1961)
- Issue: Andrew Russell, 15th Duke of Bedford; Lord Robin Russell; Lord James Russell
- Parents: Ian Russell, 13th Duke of Bedford; Clare Gwendolen Bridgman

Henry Robin Ian Russell, 14th Duke of Bedford DL (21 January 1940 – 13 June 2003) was a British peer, stockbroker and animal conservationist. He became well known to the public by appearing in three series of the BBC reality television programme Country House. During his childhood he was styled by the courtesy title Lord Howland, one of his grandfather's lesser titles, and from 1953 (following his father's inheritance of the dukedom) and for most of his adult life was styled by the courtesy title Marquess of Tavistock, his father's senior subsidiary title, and as he survived his father by only 7 1/2 months, he himself held the dukedom for that short period during 2002–2003.

== Career ==
=== Origins and education ===
He was born on 21 January 1940 at the Ritz Hotel in London, the son and heir apparent of John Ian Robert Russell, Lord Howland (1917–2002) (from August 1940 Marquess of Tavistock and from 1953 13th Duke of Bedford), by his first wife Clare Gwendolyn Bridgeman (1903–1945), who died of an overdose of sedatives, formerly the wife of Major Kenneth Chamney Walpole Hollway, MC. His father emigrated to South Africa in 1948 to farm in the Paarl area and the future 14th Duke was educated there at Western Province Preparatory School and then at the Diocesan College. He completed his education at Institut Le Rosey in Switzerland and at Harvard University in the United States. The vast historic estates of the Dukes of Bedford included Woburn Abbey in Bedfordshire, the Bedford Estate in London's Covent Garden and Bloomsbury and estates in Devonshire around the town of Tavistock, with a residence at Endsleigh Cottage.

=== Business career ===
In 1974, while working as a stockbroker at de Zoete & Bevan and living in Suffolk, he took over the running of the Woburn Estates from his father, a pioneer of the commercialisation of country houses, who then retired as a tax-exile to Monaco. Robin, then styled Marquess of Tavistock, continued with the modernisation of the Woburn estate and Woburn Safari Park established by his father, and himself established the Woburn Golf and Country Club, a successful business on the Woburn estate. However, his plans to develop a major theme park at Woburn failed to come to fruition.

He suffered a severe stroke on 21 February 1988 when he was aged just 48, which he was not expected to survive. It curtailed his powers of speech and movement and led him to pursue a more relaxed lifestyle, and to be much less of a workaholic during his later years.

With his wife, Henrietta Tiarks (Marchioness of Tavistock and later Duchess of Bedford), he appeared in the BBC series Country House, detailing the daily life and estate management at Woburn Abbey, the ancestral seat of the Russell family.

He succeeded his father to the dukedom on 25 October 2002, but died just 7 1/2 months later on 13 June 2003 after another stroke in the Tavistock Intensive Care Unit, National Hospital for Neurology and Neurosurgery, Queen Square, Bloomsbury, London, which he had been instrumental in establishing. This made him the shortest-lived Duke of Bedford. He had already handed over control of Woburn Abbey to his eldest son Andrew, Lord Howland, in 2001.

=== Père David's deer ===
After the extirpation in 1900 of the Chinese population of Père David's deer (or Milu deer), Herbrand Russell, 11th Duke of Bedford, was instrumental in saving the species, having acquired the few remaining deer from European zoos and formed a breeding herd in the deer park at Woburn Abbey. Robin Russell, then Marquess of Tavistock (the future 14th Duke of Bedford), the 11th Duke's great-grandson, was instrumental in re-establishing the species in China, having donated to that country two drafts from the Woburn herd, one in 1985 (5 males and 15 females) and the other in 1987 (18 females). The deer were released into the Nan Haizi Garden, later renamed Milu Park, in southern Beijing, the former imperial hunting grounds of the Ming and Qing emperors where the deer were last known in China. In 2005 the Beijing authorities erected a statue of the 14th Duke (who had died two years earlier) at Nan Haizi to mark the 20th Anniversary of the Milu reintroduction, in the presence of his widow and three sons.

== Marriage and issue ==
As Marquess of Tavistock on 20 June 1961 at St Clement Danes Church in London (south of the Russell family's estate of Covent Garden and Bloomsbury) he married Henrietta Joan Tiarks (born London, 5 March 1940), debutante of the year in 1957 and then a successful model, the only surviving child and heiress of Henry Frederick Tiarks (born Woodheath, Chislehurst, 8 September 1900 – died Marbella, 2 July 1995), a partner and director of Schroders merchant bank, by his second wife (whom he married on 3 October 1936) Ina Florence Marshman Bell (born London, 5 November 1903 – died Marbella, 10 April 1989), an actress known as Joan Barry, whose first husband had been Henry Hampson. Henry Tiarks had married firstly on 27 April 1930 (divorced in 1936) Lady Millicent Olivia Mary Taylour (died 24 December 1975), daughter of Geoffrey Taylour, 4th Marquess of Headfort. Henrietta, Dowager Duchess of Bedford, is a granddaughter of Frank Cyril Tiarks and a relative of Mark Phillips, and following her husband's death spends most of her time at their house in Matamata, New Zealand. By Henrietta Tiarks he had issue three sons:

- Andrew Ian Henry Russell, 15th Duke of Bedford (b. 30 March 1962), eldest son and heir, who is married with a son (Henry Robin Charles Russell, Marquess of Tavistock (b.2005)) and a daughter;
- Lord Robin Loel Hastings Russell (b. 12 August 1963)
- Lord James Edward Herbrand Russell (b. 11 February 1975)

Peerage of England
Preceded by Ian Russell	Duke of Bedford; 2002–2003	Succeeded by Andrew Russell
