= Denzil Fortescue, 6th Earl Fortescue =

British Earl (1893–1977)

The Right Honourable The Earl Fortescue
- Born: Denzil George Fortescue; 13 June 1893; Castle Hill, Devon, England
- Died: 1 June 1977 (aged 83); Ebrington, Gloucestershire, England
- Children: 4, including Richard
- Military career
- Allegiance: United Kingdom
- Branch: British Army
- Service years: 1915–1918; 1939–1944
- Rank: Lieutenant colonel
- Commands: Royal Devon Yeomanry; 1st Heavy Regiment, Royal Artillery
- Conflicts: First World War; Second World War
- Awards: Military Cross

Denzil George Fortescue, 6th Earl Fortescue MC TD (13 June 1893 – 1 June 1977) was a British peer and farmer who served in both the First World War and Second World War.

== Early life and education ==
Fortescue was the third born and second surviving son of Hugh Fortescue, 4th Earl Fortescue and Hon. Emily Ormsby-Gore, daughter of William Ormsby-Gore, 2nd Baron Harlech. He grew up at the family estate at Castle Hill, North Devon. He was educated at Eton and New College, Oxford, where he studied under William Spooner. He received the Military Cross in 1919:

== Career ==
He joined the Royal North Devon Yeomanry and in 1915 was sent to Gallipoli. After suffering a severe bout of dysentery, he returned home to recover. He rejoined the war in 1916 in France, where he fought at the Battle of the Somme. In four weeks, he fought in six battles.

For conspicuous gallantry and devotion to duty during operations at Forest and Preux-au-Bois on 25 October and 4 November 1918. He rode forward amongst the attacking troops for the purpose of gaining firsthand knowledge of the situation at a critical period of the battle, and sent back information of the greatest value.

— Citation in The London Gazette, 9 December 1919

Fortescue was commanding officer of the Royal Devon Yeomanry 1935–1941, and commanding officer of the 1st Heavy Regiment, Royal Artillery, 1942–1944.

In 1958, he succeeded to the Earldom on the death of his older brother, Hugh Fortescue, 5th Earl Fortescue, whose only son, Hugh, Viscount Ebrington had been killed at El Alamein in 1942. He became a "regular attender and occasional speaker at the House of Lords."

He lived at the family seat, Ebrington Manor, where he became a successful fruit farmer.

== Marriages and children ==
He married, firstly, Marjorie Ellinor Trotter, the granddaughter of John Hamilton, 1st Baron Hamilton of Dalzell, on 10 June 1920 and they were divorced in 1941. They had three children:

- Richard Archibald Fortescue, 7th Earl Fortescue (14 April 1922 – 7 March 1993) he married Penelope Henderson on 24 October 1949. They have two children, five grandchildren and one great-grandson. He remarried Margaret Stratton on 3 March 1961 and they were divorced in 1987. They have two daughters and two grandsons. He remarried, again, Carolyn Hill on 5 January 1989.
  - Charles Hugh Richard Fortescue, 8th Earl Fortescue (10 May 1951) he married Julia Sowrey on 12 December 1974. They have three daughters and one grandson:
    - Lady Alice Penelope Fortescue (8 June 1978)
    - Lady Kate Eleanor Fortescue (25 October 1979) she married Oliver Henry Bonas. They have one son:
      - Ossie Charles Bonas (31 October 2012)
    - Lady Lucy Beatrice Fortescue (29 April 1983)
  - Lady Celia Ann Fortescue+ (30 December 1957) she married David Adams in 1988. They have two children:
    - Georgina Penelope Anne Adams (1990)
    - Charles Michael Richard Adams (1992)
  - Lady Laura Margaret Fortescue+ (1 May 1962) she married Simon Jamieson on 1 July 1995. They have two sons:
    - Jerry Jocelyn Jamieson (1 June 1996)
    - Hugh Archibald Jamieson (8 September 1997)
  - Lady Sarah Jane Fortescue (16 August 1963) she married Francis David Sherston Chapman on 19 December 1995.
- The Honourable Martin Fortescue (b. 5 January 1924 – 15 May 2005) he married Prudence Rowley on 23 April 1954. They have four children and eight grandchildren. He remarried Caroline Loftie on 18 November 1994.
  - John Andrew Francis Fortescue (27 March 1955) he married Phoebe Burridge in 1990. They have three children:
    - Thomas Henry Horatio Fortescue (1993)
    - Hugh Augustus Francis Fortescue (9 November 1995)
    - Ophelia Marion Louisa Fortescue (22 July 1999)
  - Katharine Fortescue (30 December 1956) she married Robert Whitaker, son of Evald Mattievich Whitaker, on 9 September 1995.
  - Georgina Elizabeth Fortescue (9 November 1958) she married Nicholas Armour on 31 July 1982. They have two daughters:
    - Emily Frances Armour (1985)
    - Sophie Elizabeth Armour (1987)
  - Anthony William Fortescue (10 April 1962) he married Emma Lambert in 1992. They have three children:
    - William George Fortescue (30 June 1994)
    - Amelia Prudence Fortescue (20 March 2000)
    - Lucy Emma Fortescue (19 December 2001)
- Lady Bridget Ellinor Fortescue (b. 17 October 1927) she married Wing Commander Gordon Sinclair on 25 November 1952. They have four children and eleven grandchildren:
  - Alan Gordon William Sinclair (11 September 1956) he married Fiona B. MacEwan in 1983. They have three sons:
    - Thomas Sinclair (1985)
    - Archie Sinclair (1988)
    - Geordie Sinclair (1993)
  - Caroline Fiona Sinclair (5 November 1958) she married Julian Raymond Eric Smith, son of Jeremy Fox Eric Smith and Julia Mary Rona Burrell, on 8 May 1982. They have three children:
    - Oliver George Eric Smith (10 March 1983)
    - Lucy Alexandra Smith (18 December 1984)
    - Henry Thomas Eric Smith (9 September 1986)
  - Joanna Rosalind Sinclair (19 July 1963) she married Mark P. R. Rimell in 1992. They have two children:
    - Benjamin Charles Philip Rimell (1994)
    - Amelia Sophie Rimell (1996)
  - Robert Alister Sinclair (2 February 1965) he married Rebecca Power. They have three children:
    - Hebe Elizabeth Bridget Sinclair (5 April 2010)
    - Henry Robert Sinclair (1 June 2011)
    - Eve Sinclair

Fortescue married, secondly, Hon. Sybil Hardinge, daughter of Henry Hardinge, 3rd Viscount Hardinge, on 8 August 1941 - she had divorced her first husband Hugh Douglas-Pennant, 4th Baron Penrhyn earlier in 1941. They had one son:

- The Honourable Seymour Henry Fortescue (b. 28 May 1942) he married Julia Pilcher (daughter of Sir John Arthur Pilcher) in 1966 and they were divorced in 1990. They have two children and six grandchildren. He remarried Jennifer Simon on 23 August 1990. They have one daughter.
  - Marissa Clara Fortescue (20 October 1973) she married Maximilian, 7th Prince of Bentheim-Tecklenburg-Rheda, on 30 September 2000. They have four children:
    - Moritz Friedrich Carl, Hereditary Prince of Bentheim-Tecklenburg-Rheda (27 March 2003)
    - Princess Louise Helena Agnes Delia of Bentheim-Tecklenburg (22 April 2005)
    - Princess Amalia Anna Elisabeth of Bentheim-Tecklenburg (25 October 2007)
    - Prince Carl-Emil Maximilian Moritz-Casimir of Bentheim-Tecklenburg (10 August 2010)
  - James Adrian Fortescue (15 April 1978) he married Olivia Rodgers. They have two daughters:
    - Isla Rose Julia Fortescue (26 October 2011)
    - Aurelia Mary Elizabeth Fortescue (22 September 2014)
  - Alexandra Kate Fortescue (10 July 1991)

== Death ==
The sixth earl died 1 June 1977, just shy of his 84th birthday. A monument was erected in his honour at St Eadburgha's Church in Ebrington.

Peerage of Great Britain
Preceded by Hugh William Fortescue	Earl Fortescue; 1958–1977	Succeeded by Richard Archibald Fortescue
