= Charles Fortescue =

Charles Fortescue may refer to:

- Charles Granville Fortescue (1861–1951), British Army officer
- Charles LeGeyt Fortescue (1876–1936), Canadian electrical engineer
- Charles Fortescue, 8th Earl Fortescue (born 1951), British peer and landowner
