= Hugh Fortescue, 1st Earl Fortescue =

British peer

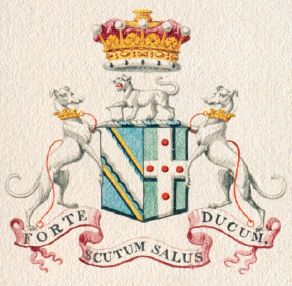
Heraldic achievement of Hugh Fortescue, 1st Earl Fortescue, showing arms of Fortescue impaling Grenville, c.1800, Possibly from a bookplate: Baron: Azure, a bend engrailled argent plain cottised or; Femme: Vert, on a cross argent five torteaux. The Latin motto of Fortescue is shown beneath: Forte Scutum Salus Ducum ("A Strong Shield is the Salvation of Leaders")

Hugh Fortescue, 1st Earl Fortescue (12 March 1753 – 16 June 1841) was a British peer, created Earl Fortescue in 1789.

He was the Member of Parliament (MP) for Beaumaris from 1784 to 1785.

== Origins ==
He was the son of Matthew Fortescue, 2nd Baron Fortescue, younger half-brother of Hugh Fortescue, 1st Earl Clinton.

== Residences ==
Earl Fortescue's residences were as follows:

- Castle Hill, Filleigh, North Devon.
- Ebrington Manor, Gloucestershire.
- Weare Giffard Hall, Devon.

== Marriage and progeny ==
Lord Fortescue married Hester Grenville (1767–1847), daughter of the Prime Minister George Grenville, on 10 May 1782. They had nine children:

- Lady Hester Fortescue (1784-1873), married Peter King, 7th Baron King and had issue.
- Hugh Fortescue, 2nd Earl Fortescue (1783–1861)
- Captain Hon. George Matthew Fortescue (1791–1877), married Lady Louisa Ryder, daughter of Dudley Ryder, 1st Earl of Harrowby and had issue, including Louia Susan, who married William Westby Moore of Dublin.
- Lady Mary Fortescue (15 September 1792, Filleigh, Devon – 12 August 1874, London). Married 15 February 1823 to Sir James Hamlyn Williams of Edwinsford, Carms., and Clovelly, Devon. Buried at Talley, Carms., in the family vault at her special request).
- Rev. Hon. John Fortescue (1796–1869)
- Lady Elizabeth Fortescue (1801–1867), married William Courtenay, 11th Earl of Devon and had issue.
- Lady Catherine Fortescue (1787 – 20 May 1854), said to have been deaf and dumb. She married in 1820 (as his second wife) her lifelong friend Hon. Newton Fellowes (1772 – January 1854), of Eggesford House, Devon, who became in the last year of his life 4th Earl of Portsmouth. They had issue, 1 son (the 5th Earl of Portsmouth b. 1825, from whom all later earls are descended) and three daughters. Her husband's two sons by his first wife both died young and/or unmarried before their father inherited the title.
- Lady Anne Fortescue (died 1864), married George Wilbraham and had issue.
- Lady Eleanor Fortescue (1798–1847), chest tomb in Weare Giffard Church, Devon.

Parliament of Great Britain
Preceded by Sir George Warren	Member of Parliament for Beaumaris; 1784–1785	Succeeded by Sir Hugh Williams, Bt
Honorary titles
Preceded by The Earl Poulett	Lord Lieutenant of Devon; 1788–1839	Succeeded by The Viscount Ebrington
Vacant Title last held by The Duke of Bedford	Vice-Admiral of Devon; 1831–1839	Succeeded by The Viscount Ebrington
Peerage of Great Britain
New creation	Earl Fortescue; 1789–1841	Succeeded by Hugh Fortescue
Preceded by Matthew Fortescue	Baron Fortescue (descended by acceleration); 1785–1839	Succeeded by Hugh Fortescue
