= Hugh Fortescue, 5th Earl Fortescue =

British soldier and politician (1888–1958)

Colonel The Right Honourable The Earl Fortescue KG CB OBE MC PC
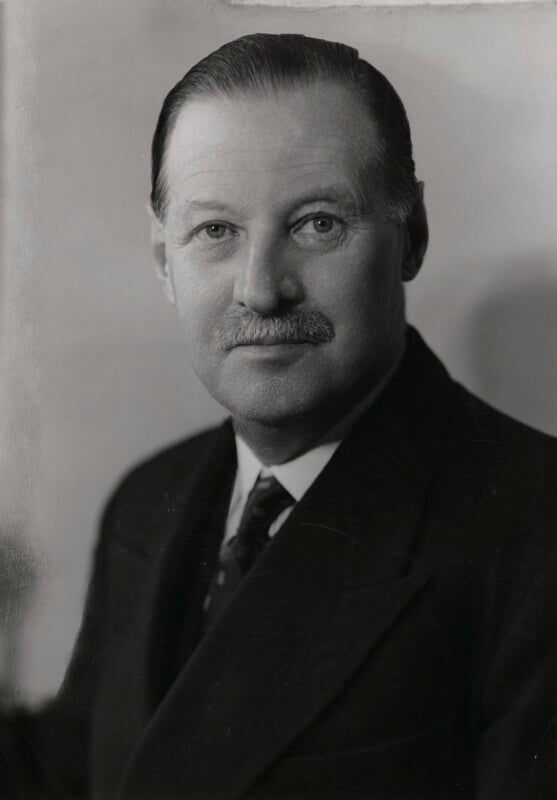
- Fortescue in 1953

Chief Whip of the House of Lords Captain of the Honourable Corps of Gentlemen-at-Arms
- In office 5 November 1951 – 27 June 1957
- Prime Minister: Winston Churchill; Anthony Eden; Harold Macmillan
- Preceded by: The Lord Shepherd
- Succeeded by: The Earl St Aldwyn
- In office 22 March 1945 – 4 August 1945
- Prime Minister: Winston Churchill
- Preceded by: The Lord Snell
- Succeeded by: The Lord Ammon

Lord-in-waiting Government Whip
- In office 26 August 1937 – 22 March 1945
- Prime Minister: Neville Chamberlain; Winston Churchill
- Preceded by: The Earl Erne
- Succeeded by: The Marquess of Normanby

Member of the House of Lords Lord Temporal
- In office 29 October 1932 – 14 June 1958; Hereditary Peerage
- Preceded by: The 4th Earl Fortescue
- Succeeded by: The 6th Earl Fortescue

Personal details
- Born: Hugh William Fortescue; 14 June 1888 St George Hanover Square, London, England
- Died: 14 June 1958 (aged 70) Castle Hill, North Devon
- Party: Conservative
- Spouse: Margaret Beaumont
- Children: 4, including Margaret
- Parent(s): Hugh Fortescue, 4th Earl Fortescue; Emily Ormsby-Gore
- Civilian awards: Knight Companion of the Order of the Garter; Companion of the Order of the Bath

Military service
- Allegiance: United Kingdom
- Branch/service: British Army
- Years of service: 1907–1918; 1939–1944
- Rank: Colonel
- Unit: Royal Scots Greys, Royal Corps of Signals
- Commands: Royal Devon Yeomanry
- Battles/wars: First World War; Second World War
- Military awards: Officer of the Order of the British Empire; Military Cross

Arms of Fortescue: Azure, a bend engrailed argent plain cotised or. Canting motto: Forte Scutum Salus Ducum ("A Strong Shield is the Salvation of Leaders")

Hugh William Fortescue, 5th Earl Fortescue (14 June 1888 – 14 June 1958), styled Viscount Ebrington from 1905 until 1932, of Castle Hill in the parish of Filleigh, of Weare Giffard Hall, both in Devon and of Ebrington Manor in Gloucestershire, was a British peer, military officer, and Conservative politician.

== Origins ==
Hugh Fortescue was the eldest son of Hugh Fortescue, 4th Earl Fortescue (1854–1932) by his wife Emily Ormsby-Gore, a daughter of William Ormsby-Gore, 2nd Baron Harlech.

== Career ==
=== Early life ===
He was educated at Eton College from 1901 to 1905, followed by the Royal Military College, Sandhurst.

=== Military service ===
In 1907 Fortescue joined the Royal Scots Greys. During the First World War (1914–18) he served in France as a regimental officer for the Scots Greys, followed by the Royal Corps of Signals. He was twice wounded in battle and received the Military Cross in 1917. Following the war he went to India where he served as an instructor at the Cavalry School at Sangor. He then served as aide-de-camp to Henry Rawlinson, 1st Baron Rawlinson, Commander-in-Chief in India. He returned to England in 1922 and joined the Royal Devon Yeomanry. He was promoted lieutenant colonel in command in 1924 and colonel in 1930 and in 1935 he became Colonel Commandant of the Honourable Artillery Company. At the outbreak of the Second World War in 1939, Fortescue joined the General Staff. He was appointed an Officer of the Order of the British Empire for war services in 1942 and Companion of the Order of the Bath in the 1946 Birthday Honours.

=== Political career ===
Fortescue succeeded his father in the earldom in 1932 and took up his seat in the House of Lords. He served under Conservative Prime Ministers Stanley Baldwin, Neville Chamberlain and Winston Churchill as a Lord-in-waiting (government whip in the House of Lords) from 1936 to 1945 and under Churchill as Captain of the Honourable Corps of Gentlemen-at-Arms (chief government whip in the House of Lords) in 1945. During the Labour Party's term in power from 1945 to 1951, he was Chief Opposition Whip in the House of Lords. He was again Captain of the Honourable Corps of Gentlemen-at-Arms under Churchill from 1951 to 1955 and under Prime Minister Sir Anthony Eden from 1955 to 1957. He was admitted to the Privy Council in 1952 and received the very great honour of being appointed a Knight Companion of the Order of the Garter in 1951.

Fortescue served as president of both the British Horse Society and Royal Agricultural Society.

== Marriage and progeny ==
On 8 February 1917 in London, Fortescue married Margaret Beaumont, a daughter of Wentworth Beaumont, 1st Viscount Allendale by his wife Lady Alexandrina Vane-Tempest, a daughter of George Vane-Tempest, 5th Marquess of Londonderry. By his wife he had four children:

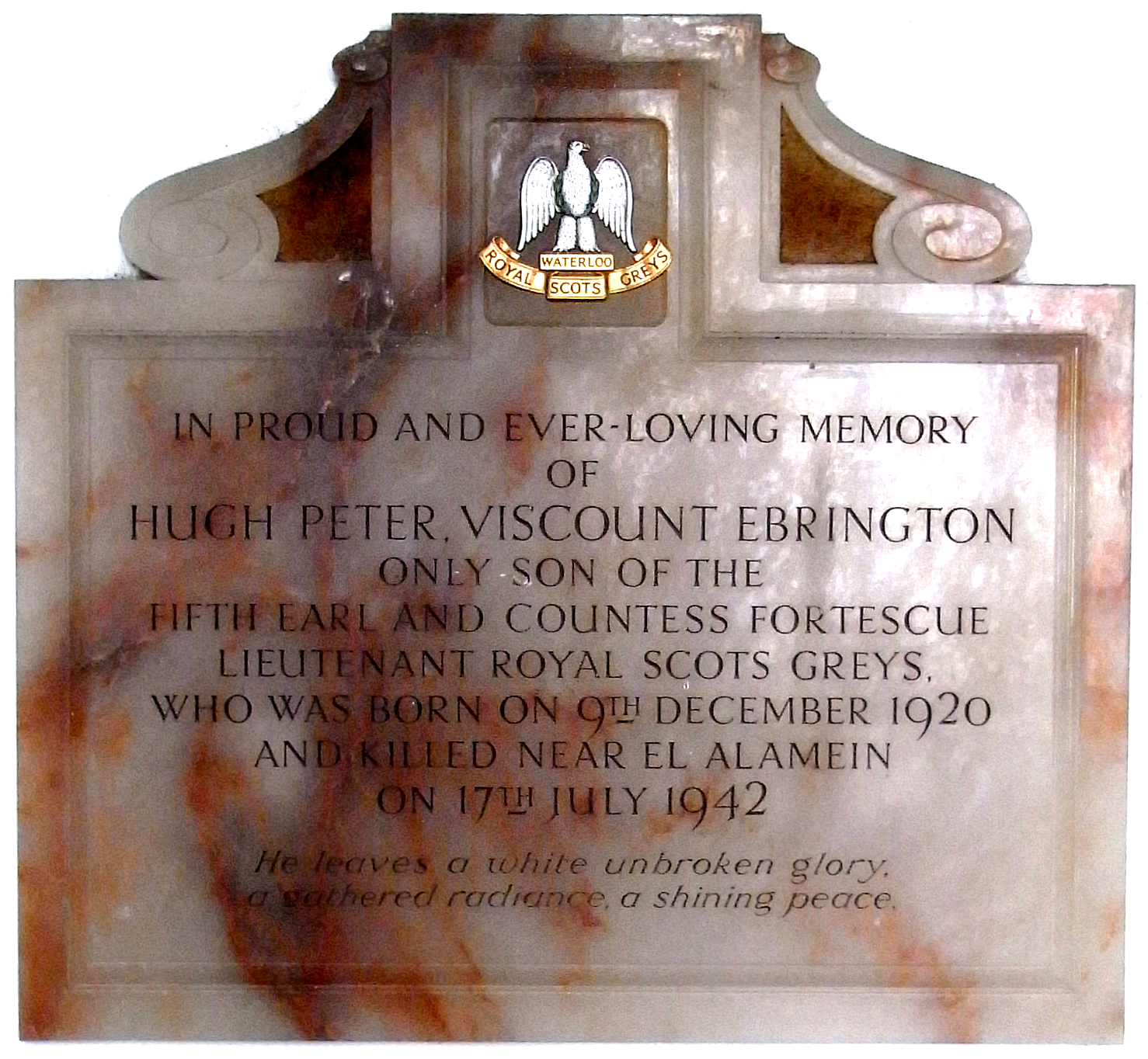
Mural monument to (Hugh) Peter Fortescue, Viscount Ebrington (1920–1942), Filleigh Church

- The Hon. Diana Margaret Fortescue (17 May 1919 – 6 April 1920), who died an infant.
- (Hugh) Peter Fortescue, Viscount Ebrington (1920–1942), only son and heir apparent, killed in action during World War II fighting for his father's old regiment the Royal Scots Greys at the First Battle of El Alamein. He died unmarried. His mural monument exists in the Fortescue Chapel of St Paul's Church, Filleigh, inscribed as follows:

"In proud and ever-loving memory of Hugh Peter, Viscount Ebrington, only son of the Fifth Earl and Countess Fortescue, Lieutenant Royal Scots Greys, who was born on 9 December 1920 and killed near El Alamein on 17 July 1942. He leaves a white unbroken glory, a gathered radiance, a shining peace"

- Lady Margaret Fortescue (13 December 1923 – 25 May 2013), eldest surviving daughter and co-heiress, who married the prominent race-horse breeder Bernard van Cutsem of Newmarket, Suffolk, and had issue. Following her inheritance (see below) Lady Margaret found herself frequently commuting the long distance between Newmarket and Devon to administer her estates at Castle Hill and at Simonsbath on Exmoor. Shortly after 1879 her grandfather Hugh Fortescue, 4th Earl Fortescue (1854–1932), Master of the Devon and Somerset Staghounds 1880/81–87, had acquired the reversion of the whole of the former Royal Forest of Exmoor after the death of Frederick Winn Knight. When Castle Hill was largely destroyed by a fire in 1934, the Fortescue family moved to Simonsbath House whilst rebuilding was in progress. Lady Margaret devoted much time to attempting to put the Exmoor estate, purchased by her grandfather largely for his sporting interest, onto a profitable footing. The marriage was unsuccessful and eventually the couple were divorced and in 1966 she resumed the surname of Fortescue. She served as a Deputy Lieutenant of Devon. In 2001 she gave a lengthy interview for the Exmoor Oral History Archive of the Dulverton and District Civic Society, which provides a valuable insight into many aspects of modern Devon history.
- Lady Elizabeth Fortescue (1 October 1926 – 17 January 2010), second daughter and co-heiress, who married William Lloyd Baxendale, Coldstream Guards, of Uckfield, Sussex, and had issue.

== Death and succession ==
Fortescue died on his 70th birthday in June 1958, four days after the death of his wife, whose funeral he was too ill to attend. As his only son and heir apparent, Lord Ebrington, had been killed in action at the Battle of El Alamein in 1942, he left no male issue, and was therefore succeeded in the earldom by his younger brother, Denzil Fortescue, 6th Earl Fortescue (1893–1977), who also inherited Ebrington Manor in Gloucestershire, thenceforth the principal seat of the Earls Fortescue.

Although the title passed to his brother on his death, the 5th Earl left his principal and grandest seat, Castle Hill, Filleigh in North Devon, to his elder surviving daughter, Lady Margaret Fortescue (1923–2013). Castle Hill is now the home of her daughter Eleanor, Countess of Arran (née van Cutsem) and her husband Arthur Gore, 9th Earl of Arran. The 5th Earl Fortescue left his secondary Devon seat, Weare Giffard Hall, to his younger daughter Lady Elizabeth Baxendale (born 1926), who sold it in 1960.

Military offices
Preceded by Viscount Galway	Colonel Commandant and President, Honourable Artillery Company; 1935–1943	Succeeded by Viscount Gort
Political offices
Preceded by The Marquess of Dufferin and Ava	Lord-in-waiting; 1937–1945	Succeeded by The Marquess of Normanby
Preceded by The Lord Snell	Captain of the Gentlemen-at-Arms; 1945	Succeeded by The Lord Ammon
Preceded by The Lord Shepherd	Captain of the Gentlemen-at-Arms; 1951–1957	Succeeded by The Earl St Aldwyn
Party political offices
Preceded by The Lord Templemore	Conservative Chief Whip in the House of Lords; 1945–1957	Succeeded by The Earl St Aldwyn
Honorary titles
Preceded by The Lord Mildmay of Flete	Lord Lieutenant of Devon; 1936–1958	Succeeded by The Lord Roborough
Peerage of Great Britain
Preceded by Hugh Fortescue	Earl Fortescue; 1932–1958	Succeeded by Denzil Fortescue
