= Modbury Priory =

Former priory in Devon, England

Coordinates: 50.34848°N 3.89035°W

Modbury Priory was a Benedictine priory in the parish of Modbury, Devon, England, established before 1129 which was one of the longest surviving alien priories in England, most of which were suppressed in 1414. It was located close to the present parish church of St George in the town of Modbury, but its exact location is unclear.

== History ==
=== Foundation ===
It was founded at some time before 1129 by Ralph de Vautort and his brother Reginald I de Vautort (died about 1123), 1st feudal baron of Trematon in Cornwall (Latinised to de Valletorta), an Anglo-Norman follower of Robert, Count of Mortain, half-brother of King William the Conqueror. Reginald I de Vautort held 55 manors in Devon and Cornwall from Robert, one of which was Modbury. The Vautort family is believed to have originated at the manor of Torteval in Calvados, Normandy. The priory was a dependency of the Abbey of Saint-Pierre-sur-Dives in Calvados. The right to appoint a new prior continued to be held by the lord of the manor of Modbury, for many generations in the 15th and 16th centuries the Champernowne family (Latinised to de Campo Arnulphi), with the approval of the Bishop of Exeter. Thus this right was exercised in 1361/2 by Thomas Champernowne and in 1429/30 by Hugh Champernowne.

=== Donated to Eton College ===
It survived King Henry V's Suppression of Alien Priories of 1414, but in 1441, under the priorship of William Benselyn, it was finally dissolved by King Henry VI, who gave its possessions to his new foundation of Eton College.

=== Donated to Tavistock Abbey ===
King Edward IV, having deposed Henry VI in 1461, reassigned Modbury's lands in 1466 to Tavistock Abbey in Devon, much favoured by him, but these were soon after restored to Eton, which continued to hold many of them until the 19th century and beyond.

== Sources ==
- Religious buildings and life in early Modbury, The History of Modbury, Devon
- Modbury Priory, Pastscape, English Heritage
