= Church of St Eadburga, Ebrington =

Church in Gloucestershire, England

Coordinates: 52.0580°N 1.7335°W

Church of St Eadburga
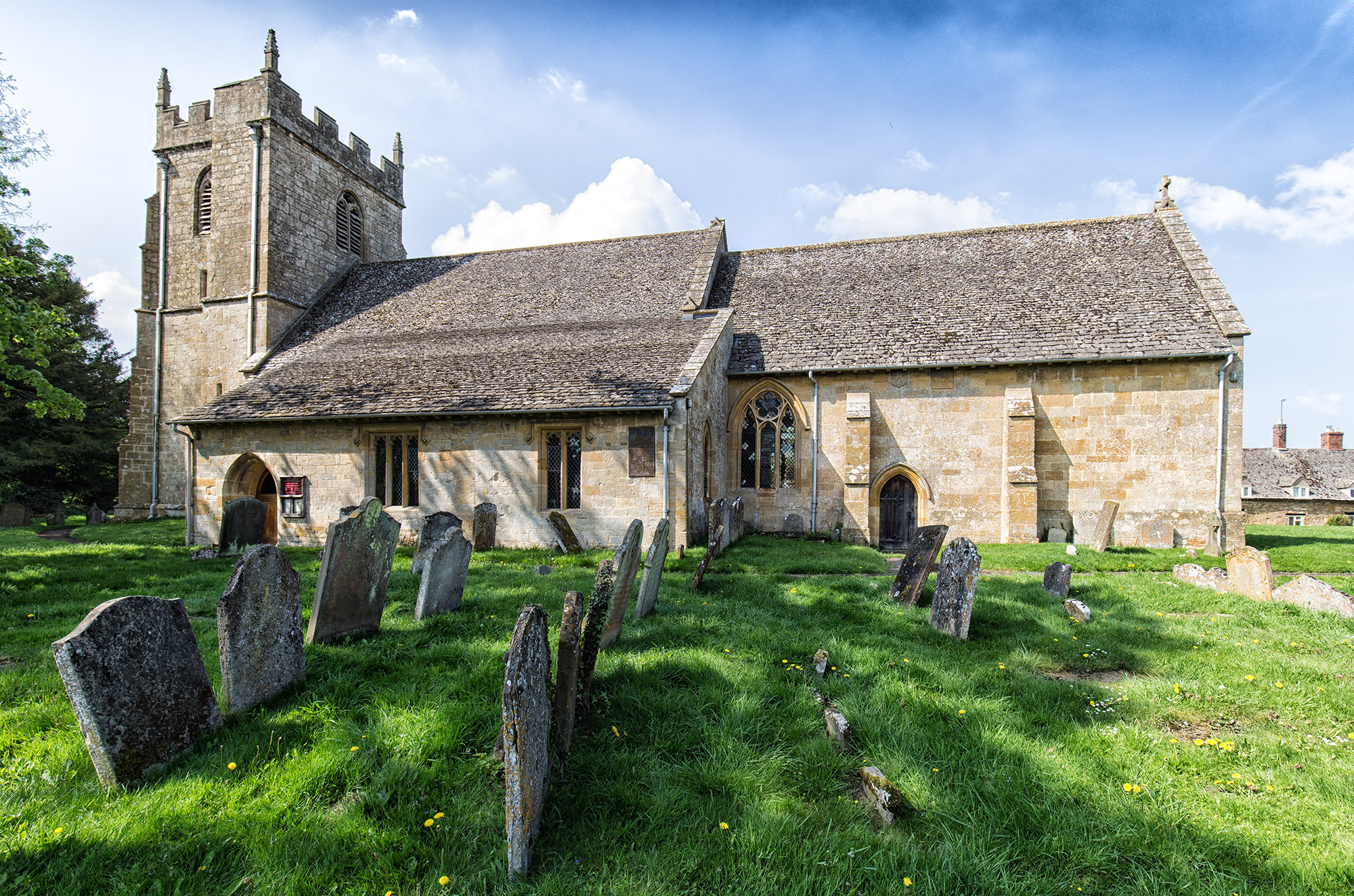

- Denomination: Church of England
- Website: www.ebringtonchurch.org.uk/welcome.htm

Architecture
- Heritage designation: Grade I listed building
- Designated: 25 August 1960

Administration
- Province: Canterbury
- Diocese: Gloucester
- Benefice: Vale and Cotswold Edge

The Anglican Church of St Eadburga at Ebrington in the Cotswold District of Gloucestershire, England, was built in the 13th century. It is a grade I listed building.

== History ==
The church has a Norman nave. The aisle and chancel are from the 13th century. A Victorian restoration was carried out in 1875 and 1876.

The parish is part of the Vale and Cotswold Edge benefice within the Diocese of Gloucester.

== Architecture ==
The stone building is supported by buttresses and has a limestone slate roof. It has a two-stage tower.

It includes monuments to the Fortescue family including one to Sir John Fortescue in his robes as Lord Chief Justice.

There is a 17th-century canopied pulpit and medieval stained glass windows, some of which is from the 16th and 17th centuries. A wooden royal coat of arms dates from 1725. The font is from the 13th century.

The church contains a carved wooden board as a memorial to those from the village who died in World War II.
