= David Fursdon =

English cricketer

Lord Lieutenant of Devon
- Incumbent
- Assumed office 17 April 2015
- Monarchs: Elizabeth II; Charles III
- Preceded by: Eric Dancer

High Sheriff of Devon
- In office 1 January 2009 – 1 January 2010

Personal details
- Born: 20 December 1952 (age 73) Bitchet Green, Kent, England
- Spouse: Catriona née McCreath
- Children: 3
- Occupation: Landowner and former cricketer
- Profession: Cricketer
- Website: https://www.lordlieutenantofdevon.org.uk

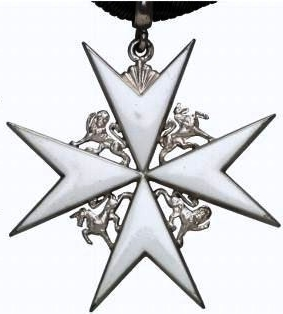
CStJ neck badge

Edward David Fursdon (born 20 December 1952) is an English landowner and former cricketer.

David Fursdon serves as the current Lord Lieutenant of Devon.

== Early life, military service and cricket ==
The son of Major General Francis William Edward Fursdon, and his wife, Joan Rosemary Worssam, he was born in 1952 at Bitchet Green, Kent. After attending Sherborne School, Fursdon was commissioned into the 6th Gurkha Rifles as a Second Lieutenant in February 1972, serving in Brunei and British Hong Kong. He had previously won a scholarship to the University of Oxford, where after military service he studied at St John's College from October 1972–July 1975.

While studying at Oxford, Fursdon made his debut in first-class cricket for Oxford University against Gloucestershire at The Parks in 1973. He played first-class cricket for Oxford until 1975, making sixteen appearances. Playing as an all-rounder, he scored 479 runs for Oxford at an average of 22.80 and a top score of 112 not out, which was his only first-class century and came against Cambridge University in The University Match of 1975. With his right-arm medium-fast bowling, he took 37 wickets at a bowling average of 35.94, with best figures of 4 for 13. He also made a single first-class appearance for a combined Oxford and Cambridge Universities cricket team against the touring Indians in 1974, taking his career best bowling figures of 6 for 60 during the first innings of the match. In addition to playing first-class cricket while at Oxford, he also made four List A one-day appearances for the Combined Universities cricket team which defeated two first class counties in the 1975 Benson & Hedges Cup. He gained two cricket blues while at Oxford and is a member of MCC.

== Civil Service, teaching and later life ==
After graduating from Oxford, Fursdon joined the Civil Service, working at the Ministry of Defence in the Navy Department and on nuclear disarmament and as part of a British delegation at a United Nations Conference on Disarmament in Geneva in 1979. Fursdon left HM Civil Service in 1979 and transferred to Devon to take on the challenge of resuscitating the Fursdon Estate. To help this he firstly became a teacher at Blundell's School, serving subsequently on the school's board of governors for 27 years, the last 11 as chairman. He played minor counties cricket for Devon in 1981, making four appearances in the Minor Counties Championship.

Fursdon attended the Royal Agricultural University (RAU) 1984/06 (elected Honorary Fellow in 2016), qualifying as a rural surveyor (FRICS) and worked as an equity partner, land agent and property auctioneer at Stags until 2003. He was Board Chairman (2003–05) and then President (2005–07) of the Country Land and Business Association (CLA), was a Commissioner of the Affordable Rural Housing Commission in 2005/06 and was a member of the Board of both the Crown Estate (2008–16) and English Heritage (2010–14).

He volunteered as Chairman of the SW Board for the London 2012 Olympic Games which oversaw the torch relay in the SW and the sailing competition at Weymouth and Portland; as Chairman of the DEFRA/Industry Future of Farming Review in 2013 looking at opportunities for New Entrants in Agriculture and as Chairman of the SW Rural Productivity Commission for the four SW LEPs in 2015. Other voluntary roles include Trustee on the Board of the National Trust (from 2016); Trustee of the Prince's Countryside Fund (from 2019), rural non-executive for the Duchy of Cornwall (from 2008) and initially working on the agricultural skills agenda and then as the first Chairman of TIAH (The Institute for Agriculture and Horticulture).

In 2014 Fursdon became Chairman of Dyson Farming and in 2017, a Commissioner and subsequently (2019) a Trustee of the Food, Farming and Countryside Commission.

High Sheriff of Devon for 2009/10, since 2015 Fursdon has served as Lord Lieutenant of Devon, being appointed CStJ in 2018 and awarded an Hon DSc from Harper Adams University in 2017.

With his wife, Catriona née McCreath (m. 1978), he has three sons and five grandchildren.

== See also ==
- Burke's Landed Gentry

Honorary titles
Preceded by Sir Eric Dancer	Lord Lieutenant of Devon; 2015–present	Incumbent
