= Fursdon =

Fursdon may refer to:

- David Fursdon (born 1952), English cricketer, Lord Lieutenant of Devon since 2015
- Major General Francis William Edward Fursdon - see 1980 New Year Honours
- George Fursdon, High Sheriff of Devon in 1752
- John Fursdon (died 1638), English Benedictine monk
- John Fursdon (MP), Member of Parliament for Liskeard (UK Parliament constituency) in 1420
- Phil Fursdon, singer in Racey

== See also ==
- Fursdon, Devon, a historic house and farming estate in Devon
