= Earl Fortescue =

Earldom in the Peerage of Great Britain

- Arms of Fortescue: Azure, a bend engrailed argent plain cotised or
- Creation date: 1789
- Created by: George III
- Peerage: Peerage of Great Britain
- First holder: Hugh Fortescue, 3rd Baron Fortescue
- Present holder: Charles Fortescue, 8th Earl Fortescue
- Heir presumptive: John Fortescue
- Remainder to: Heirs male of the body
- Subsidiary titles: Viscount Ebrington; Baron Fortescue of Castle Hill
- Seat: Ebrington Manor
- Former seat: Castle Hill
- Motto: Forte Scutum Salus Ducum ("A Strong Shield is the Salvation of Leaders")

Earl Fortescue is a title in the Peerage of Great Britain that was created in 1789 for Hugh Fortescue, 3rd Baron Fortescue (1753–1841), a member of parliament for Beaumaris and Lord-Lieutenant of Devon.

== History ==
The Earls Fortescue descend from Sir Hugh Fortescue (1665–1719) of Filleigh and of Weare Giffard, both in Devon, whose first wife's first cousin had been 13th Baron Clinton and 5th Earl of Lincoln. In 1721 the abeyance of the ancient barony of Clinton was terminated in favour of his son Hugh Fortescue (1696–1751), who thus became the 14th Baron Clinton. On 5 July 1746, he was created Earl Clinton, with normal remainder to the heirs male of his body and Baron Fortescue, of Castle Hill in the County of Devon, with special remainder, failing heirs male of his body, to his half-brother Matthew Fortescue. Both titles were in the Peerage of Great Britain.

Hugh Fortescue, 1st Earl Clinton (1696–1751), had no legitimate children and thus on his death the barony of Clinton fell into abeyance (see Baron Clinton for later history of this title) while the earldom of Clinton became extinct. He was succeeded in the barony of Fortescue (according to the special remainder) by his half-brother Matthew Fortescue, 2nd Baron Fortescue.

Matthew's son Hugh Fortescue, 3rd Baron Fortescue (1753–1841), was a member of parliament for Beaumaris and served as Lord-Lieutenant of Devon. In 1789 he was created Viscount Ebrington, of Ebrington in the County of Gloucester, and Earl Fortescue, in the Peerage of Great Britain. He married Hester Grenville, a daughter of Prime Minister George Grenville.

He was succeeded by his eldest son Hugh Fortescue, 2nd Earl Fortescue (1783–1861), who was a prominent Whig politician. After representing several constituencies in the House of Commons he was summoned in 1839 to the House of Lords through a writ of acceleration in his father's junior title of Baron Fortescue. He then served under Lord Melbourne as Lord-Lieutenant of Ireland from 1839 to 1841 and under Lord John Russell as Lord Steward of the Household from 1846 to 1850. His son Hugh Fortescue, 3rd Earl Fortescue (1818–1905), was also a Whig politician and held minor office from 1846 to 1851 in the same government as his father. In 1859 he was summoned to the House of Lords through a writ of acceleration in his father's junior title of Baron Fortescue. His eldest son Hugh Fortescue, 4th Earl Fortescue (1854–1932), sat as Liberal Member of Parliament for Tiverton and for Tavistock. He also held the honorary position of Lord-Lieutenant of Devon. On his death the titles passed to his eldest son Hugh Fortescue, 5th Earl Fortescue (1888–1958), a Conservative politician who served as Captain of the Honourable Corps of Gentlemen-at-Arms (Chief Government Whip in the House of Lords) in 1945 and from 1951 to 1958. He died without surviving male issue and (having bequeathed the two principle ancestral seats of Castle Hill, Filleigh, and Weare Giffard Hall, to his two daughters), was succeeded in the earldom by his third and youngest brother Denzil Fortescue, 6th Earl Fortescue (1893–1977), who inherited the ancient Fortescue seat of Ebrington Manor in Gloucestershire. He was succeeded by his eldest son Richard Fortescue, 7th Earl Fortescue (1922–1993), who was succeeded by his eldest son Charles Fortescue, 8th Earl Fortescue (born 1951), living in 2015.

Several other members of the Fortescue family may also be mentioned. The Hon. George Fortescue, second son of the first Earl, was Member of Parliament for Hindon. The Hon. John Fortescue, second son of the second Earl, was Member of Parliament for Barnstaple. The Hon. Dudley Fortescue, third son of the second Earl, was Member of Parliament for Andover. The Hon. Sir Seymour John Fortescue (1856–1942), second son of the third Earl, was a captain in the Royal Navy and also served as Serjeant at Arms in the House of Lords. The Hon. Arthur Grenville Fortescue (1858–1895), fourth son of the third Earl, was a captain in the army and the grandfather of Arthur Henry Grenville Fortescue, a brigadier in the army. The Hon. Sir John William Fortescue, fifth son of the third Earl, was a major in the army and writer on the British Army. The Hon. Charles Grenville Fortescue (1861–1951), sixth son of the third Earl, was a brigadier-general in the army.

== Seats ==
The principal seat of the present Earl Fortescue is Ebrington Manor, near Chipping Campden, Gloucestershire, purchased by his distant ancestor Sir John Fortescue (c.1394-1479), Chief Justice of the King's Bench, a younger grandson of the Fortescue family of Whympston in the parish of Modbury in Devon, the earliest Fortescue seat in England. The more grandiose former seat Castle Hill, Filleigh, North Devon, rebuilt as a Palladian mansion by Hugh Fortescue, 1st Earl Clinton (1696–1751), has been since the death of the 5th Earl in 1958, the property and residence of descendants in the female line. Other historic Devon seats of branches of the Fortescue family were: Whympston in the parish of Modbury; Weare Giffard; Buckland Filleigh; Preston; Spriddlestone in the parish of Brixton and Fallapit in the parish of East Allington, all in Devon.

== Barons Fortescue (1746) ==
- Hugh Fortescue, 1st Earl Clinton, 1st Baron Fortescue, 14th Baron Clinton (1696–1751)
- Matthew Fortescue, 2nd Baron Fortescue (1719–1785), half-brother;
- Hugh Fortescue, 3rd Baron Fortescue (1753–1841), son, created Earl Fortescue in 1789

== Earls Fortescue (1789) ==
- Hugh Fortescue, 1st Earl Fortescue (1753–1841)
- Hugh Fortescue, 2nd Earl Fortescue (1783–1861)
- Hugh Fortescue, 3rd Earl Fortescue (1818–1905)
- Hugh Fortescue, 4th Earl Fortescue (1854–1932)
- Hugh William Fortescue, 5th Earl Fortescue (1888–1958)
- Denzil George Fortescue, 6th Earl Fortescue (1893–1977)
- Richard Archibald Fortescue, 7th Earl Fortescue (1922–1993)
- Charles Hugh Richard Fortescue, 8th Earl Fortescue (born 1951)

The heir presumptive is the present holder's first cousin John Andrew Francis Fortescue (born 1955).
