= Richard Fortescue, 7th Earl Fortescue =

Richard Archibald Fortescue, 7th Earl Fortescue (14 April 1922 – 7 March 1993) was a British peer, the son of Denzil Fortescue, 6th Earl Fortescue.

He married firstly, Penelope Henderson (d. 1959) on 24 October 1949. They had two children:

- Charles Hugh Richard Fortescue, 8th Earl Fortescue (b. 10 May 1951)
- Lady Celia Ann Fortescue (b. 30 December 1957), married David Adams and had issue.

He married secondly, Margaret Stratton, on 3 March 1961 and they were divorced in 1987. They had two children:

- Lady Laura Fortescue (b. 1 May 1962)
- Lady Sarah Fortescue (b. 1963)

Lord Fortescue married thirdly, Carolyn Hill in 1989.

Peerage of Great Britain
Preceded by Denzil Fortescue	Earl Fortescue; 1977–1993	Succeeded by Charles Fortescue
