= Eric Dancer =

British businessman (born 1940)

Lord Lieutenant of Devon
- In office 16 September 1998 – 17 April 2015
- Monarch: Elizabeth II
- Preceded by: John St Aubyn Parker
- Succeeded by: David Fursdon

Sir Eric Dancer KCVO CBE KStJ (born 17 April 1940) is a British businessman and formerly Lord-Lieutenant of Devon.

== Biography ==
Dancer was born in Sheffield in 1940. He won a scholarship to King Edward VII School and went on to Sheffield Polytechnic where he became a graduate of the Chartered Institute of Management and the Chartered Institute of Purchasing and Supply. After moving to Devon in 1980 he attained the Diploma in Company Direction at Exeter University.

His career has been in industry, with over 30 years at Board level of which the last 20 were as Managing Director of Dartington Crystal, prior to his retirement in 2000.

He was the founding Chairman of Devon and Cornwall Training and Enterprise Council, the TEC National Council, the West Country Development Corporation, served as a National TEC Assessor, Advisor to the Secretary of State for Employment, Member of the National Training Task Force, Member of the Councils of the CBI and Royal Society of Arts and as a Governor of the University of Plymouth.

In 1998 he was appointed Her Majesty's Lord-Lieutenant of Devon (a post which he held until 2015), and a Knight of Grace of the Order of St John and Justice of the Peace. In 2001 he received an Honorary Doctorate from Sheffield Hallam University and in 2002 was commissioned Honorary Captain Royal Naval Reserve. Honorary Doctorates of Law and Business were conferred by Exeter and Plymouth Universities respectively in 2010.

He is a Freeman of the City of London, Liveryman of the Worshipful Company of Glass Sellers, Life Member of the Royal Society of Arts, President, Patron or Trustee of some 20 Charities in Devon, Chairman of the Magistrates Advisory Committee for Devon and Cornwall and Devon County President of The Reserve Forces and Cadets.

Dancer lives in South Devon with his wife Carole and having given up flying light aeroplanes, gliders and sailing, spending his free time listening to music, reading, current affairs and world travel.

On 21st October 2025, Dancer was mentioned on the BBC Radio 1 breakfast show with Greg James, where he was highlighted as the answer to a question on Yesterday's Quiz. The caller, Beth the Midwife, was asked to name a cricketer.

== Honours and awards ==
- 15 June 1991 - Dancer was appointed Commander of the Order of the British Empire (CBE) in 1991 for services to business and training.
- 20 January 1999 - Promoted to a Knight of the Order of St. John (K.stJ)
- 15 June 2013 - Dancer was appointed a Knight Commander of the Royal Victorian Order (KCVO) in the 2013 Birthday Honours for his work as Lord-Lieutenant.

== Honorary Doctorate ==
Sir Eric Dancer was awarded an Honorary Doctorate of Business from Plymouth University and Honorary Doctor of Laws from Exeter University in 2010.

== Footnotes ==
Honorary titles
| Preceded by The Earl of Morley | Lord Lieutenant of Devon; 1998–2015 | Succeeded by David Fursdon |
