= Ebrington =

Village in Gloucestershire, England

Coordinates: 52.0580°N 1.7322°W

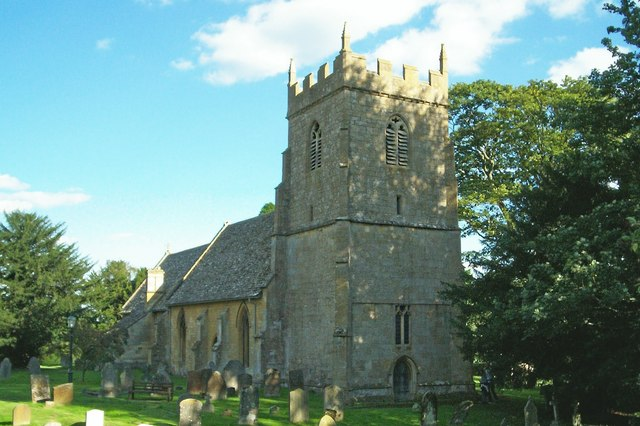
- Church of St Eadburga, Ebrington

- Location within Gloucestershire
- Population: 570 (2011)
- Civil parish: Ebrington
- District: Cotswold
- Shire county: Gloucestershire
- Region: South West
- Country: England
- Sovereign state: United Kingdom
- Post town: CHIPPING CAMPDEN
- Postcode district: GL55
- Dialling code: 01386
- Police: Gloucestershire
- Fire: Gloucestershire
- Ambulance: South Western
- UK Parliament: North Cotswolds
- Website: Ebrington Parish Council

Ebrington (known locally as Yabberton or Yubberton) is a village and civil parish in Gloucestershire, England, about 2 miles (3.2 km) from Chipping Campden. It has narrow lanes and tiny streets of Cotswold stone houses and cottages, many of which are thatched. Near Ebrington is the National Trust property of Hidcote Manor with notable Cotswold gardens.

== History ==
Ebrington has a history of settlement reaching back to before the Roman era. Iron Age pottery, a gold coin and Neolithic/Bronze Age flints have been found. The village is 26 NNE of Cirencester (Roman Corinium, Britain's second largest town after London). The Cotswold region formed part of the rich 'villa zone' of Roman Britain, the wealthiest part of Britain. The Fosse Way Roman road runs south-west 6 miles away from the village. In 1958–1959, a Roman villa on the eastern edge of the village, facing towards the Fosse Way, was excavated. Described as a bathing house, the rooms were "sumptuously appointed" and included a tesselated floor and a plunge bath. Roman tiles were re-used in the church buildings.

Ebrington is mentioned in the Domesday Book of 1086 as a settlement of 33 households situated within hundred of Witley and the county of Gloucestershire. This put the village in the largest 40% of settlements recorded in Domesday and included two mills and 8 slaves. The tenant in chief was William Goizenboded who held land from the king in 13 other places, all but one in Gloucestershire.

Ebrington Manor has existed at Ebrington since the 14th century; it is owned by the Fortescue family who also had estates in Exmoor.

== Church ==
The ancient church of St Eadburga shows many monuments to the family including one to Sir John Fortescue in his robes as Lord Chief Justice. Sir John died in 1476. The church is mainly Perpendicular with some Norman work remaining in the north and south doorways, of its other notable features the church shows a 17th-century canopied pulpit and medieval stained glass windows. It is a Grade I listed building. In the church is a memorial to John Tonge, a slave trader from a prominent slave trading family in Bristol, who died in Ebrington.

== Economy ==
The Ebrington Arms pub at the centre of the village dates from 1640, and was voted the Campaign for Real Ale (CAMRA) North Cotswolds Pub of the Year in 2009, 2010 and 2011. It has held two AA Rosettes for food since 2010.

== Education ==
Ebrington Primary school is federated with a larger primary (St James in Chipping Campden). It received a "Good" Ofsted inspection in 2014 and in 2019 was rated as "Requires Improvement". Ebrington Primary celebrated its 175 birthday in 2016 with a 'living history' day for the children and the official opening of new playground equipment.

== Geography ==
The Fruit and Vegetable Preservation Research Station was built in the west of the village.
