= Lord Lieutenant of Devon =

Office created during the reign of Henry VIII

The Office of the Lord Lieutenant was created during the reign of Henry VIII (1509–1547), taking over the military duties of the Sheriffs and control of the military forces of the Crown. From 1569 there was provision for the appointment of Deputy Lieutenants, and in 1662 the Lord-Lieutenant was given entire control of the militia. The Regulation of the Forces Act 1871 transferred this function back to the Crown, and in 1921, the office lost its power to call upon men of the county to fight in case of need. Since 1711 all the Lord Lieutenants have also been Custos Rotulorum of Devon.

== Appointment and current duties ==
Lord Lieutenants are appointed by the King for each county in the United Kingdom, to represent the Crown. They are non-political and retire at the age of 75. The post is unpaid.

The five main duties of the Lord Lieutenant are:

- Arranging visits to the county by members of the royal family and escorting royal visitors;
- Presenting medals and awards on behalf of His Majesty, and advising on honours nominations;
- As Custos Rotulorum of Devon, leading local judicial bodies as Chairman of the Advisory Committees on Justices of the Peace and General Commissioners of Income Tax;
- Liaising with local units of the Royal Navy, Royal Marines, Army (and Territorial Army), Royal Air Force and associated cadet forces; and
- Participating in civic and voluntary activities.

== List of Lord Lieutenants of Devon ==
The following persons served as Lord Lieutenant of Devon:

- John Russell, 1st Earl of Bedford 1552–1555 of Bedford House, Exeter and of Chenies in Buckinghamshire;
- John Bourchier, 2nd Earl of Bath 1556–1561, of Tawstock, Devon
- Francis Russell, 2nd Earl of Bedford 1584 – 28 July 1585
- William Bourchier, 3rd Earl of Bath 12 September 1586 – 12 July 1623 (son-in-law of his predecessor Francis Russell, 2nd Earl of Bedford), of Tawstock, Devon
- Francis Russell, 4th Earl of Bedford 18 July 1623 – 9 May 1641 jointly with
- William Russell, 1st Duke of Bedford 30 March 1637 – 1642
- Interregnum
- George Monck, 1st Duke of Albemarle 23 July 1660 – 3 January 1670, of Potheridge, Devon
- John Granville, 1st Earl of Bath 10 February 1670 – 1675, of Stowe, Kilkhampton, Cornwall and of Bideford, Devon;
- Christopher Monck, 2nd Duke of Albemarle 2 December 1675 – 1685, of Potheridge, Devon
- John Granville, 1st Earl of Bath 7 December 1685 – 1696 jointly with
- Charles Granville, 2nd Baron Granville 6 May 1691 – 1693
- Thomas Grey, 2nd Earl of Stamford 24 April 1696 – 1702
- John Poulett, 1st Earl Poulett 21 July 1702 – 1714
- Sir William Courtenay, 2nd Baronet 4 December 1714 – 1716, of Powderham, Devon
- John Carteret, 2nd Baron Carteret 13 July 1716 – 1721
- Hugh Fortescue, 14th Baron Clinton 9 August 1721 – 1733, of Castle Hill, Filleigh, Devon
- Robert Walpole, 2nd Earl of Orford 9 May 1733 – 31 March 1751, of Heanton Satchville, Petrockstowe, Devon (which he never visited) and of Houghton Hall, Norfolk
- John Russell, 4th Duke of Bedford 23 April 1751 – 5 January 1771
- Vere Poulett, 3rd Earl Poulett 6 February 1771 – 14 April 1788
- Hugh Fortescue, 1st Earl Fortescue 21 May 1788 – 1839, of Castle Hill, Filleigh, Devon
- Hugh Fortescue, 2nd Earl Fortescue 15 November 1839 – 14 September 1861, of Castle Hill, Filleigh, Devon
- Edward Seymour, 12th Duke of Somerset 9 November 1861 – 28 November 1885, of Stover, Teigngrace, Devon and of Berry Pomeroy, Devon;
- Stafford Northcote, 1st Earl of Iddesleigh 20 January 1886 – 12 January 1887, of Pynes, Upton Pyne, Devon
- Charles Hepburn-Stuart-Forbes-Trefusis, 20th Baron Clinton 16 February 1887 – 29 March 1904, of Heanton Satchville, Huish
- Hugh Fortescue, 4th Earl Fortescue 22 April 1904 – 1928, of Castle Hill, Filleigh, Devon
- Francis Bingham Mildmay, 1st Baron Mildmay of Flete 30 June 1928 – 1936, of Flete, Holbeton, Devon
- Hugh Fortescue, 5th Earl Fortescue 5 May 1936 – 14 June 1958, of Castle Hill, Filleigh, Devon
- Massey Lopes, 2nd Baron Roborough 16 July 1958 – 5 October 1978, of Maristow, Tamerton Foliot
- Sir Richard Amyatt Hull 5 October 1978 – 10 May 1982
- John St Aubyn Parker, 6th Earl of Morley 10 May 1982 – 16 September 1998 of Saltram, Plympton
- Sir Eric Dancer 16 September 1998 – 17 April 2015
- David Fursdon since 17 April 2015

== Deputy lieutenants ==
A deputy lieutenant of Devon is commissioned by the Lord Lieutenant of Devon. Deputy lieutenants support the work of the lord-lieutenant. There can be several deputy lieutenants at any time, depending on the population of the county. Their appointment does not terminate with the changing of the lord-lieutenant, but they usually retire at age 75.

=== 19th century ===
- 25 January 1831: John Quicke
- 25 January 1831: William Nation
- 25 January 1831: John Milford
- 25 January 1831: Samuel White
- 25 January 1831: John White Abbott
- 25 January 1831: Charles Holman
- 25 January 1831: George Truscott
- 25 January 1831: William Browning
