= Charles Fortescue, 8th Earl Fortescue =

British peer and landowner (born 1951)

The Right Honourable The Earl Fortescue
- Born: 10 May 1951 (age 73)
- Education: Eton College
- Spouse: Julia B. Sowrey (m. 1974)
- Children: 3 daughters
- Parents: Richard Fortescue (father); Penelope Jane Henderson (mother)

Charles Hugh Richard Fortescue, 8th Earl Fortescue (born 10 May 1951) is a British peer and landowner. He was a hereditary member of the House of Lords from 1995 to 1999.

The son of Richard Fortescue, 7th Earl Fortescue, and his wife Penelope Jane Henderson, he was educated at Eton College.

On 7 March 1993, Fortescue succeeded to his father's peerages, Earl Fortescue and Viscount Ebrington (1789) and Baron Fortescue (1746), all in the peerage of Great Britain. This at the time gave him a seat in the House of Lords as of right, but in the event he did not take it up until December 1995, and in November 1999 it came to an end, as a result of the House of Lords Act 1999.

On 12 December 1974, Fortescue married Julia B. Sowrey, daughter of Air Commodore John Adam Sowrey and Audrey Alice Estelle Harper, and they had three daughters:

- Lady Alice Penelope Fortescue (born 1978)
- Lady Kate Eleanor Fortescue (born 1979)
- Lady Lucy Beatrice Fortescue (born 1983)

In 2003, Fortescue was reported in Burke's Peerage to have his country seat at Ebrington Manor, Ebrington, Gloucestershire.

The heir presumptive to the peerages is a cousin, John Andrew Francis Fortescue (born 1955).

== Notes ==
Peerage of Great Britain
Preceded by Richard Fortescue	Earl Fortescue; 1993–present	Incumbent
