= Castle Hill, Filleigh =

Country house in Devon, England

Coordinates: 51.0401°N 3.8969°W

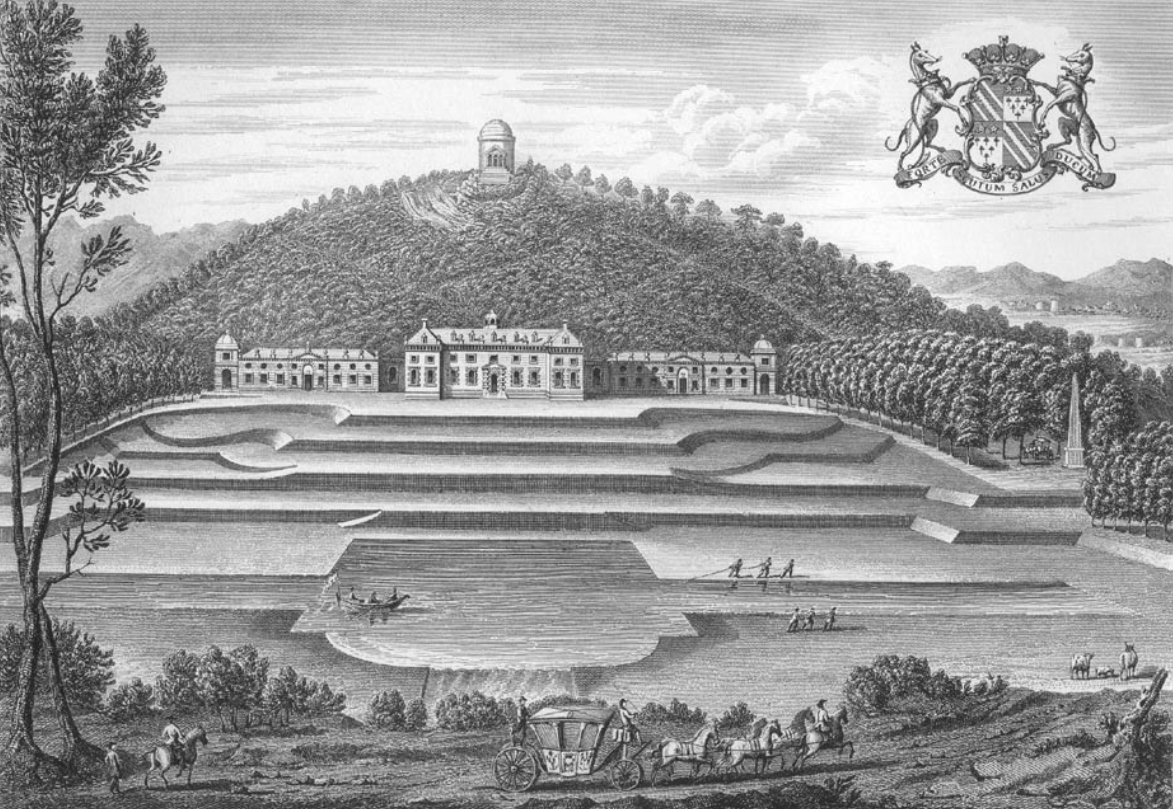
Castle Hill, Filleigh, Devon, as built by Hugh Fortescue, 1st Earl Clinton, whose arms, quartering Clinton, are shown at top right

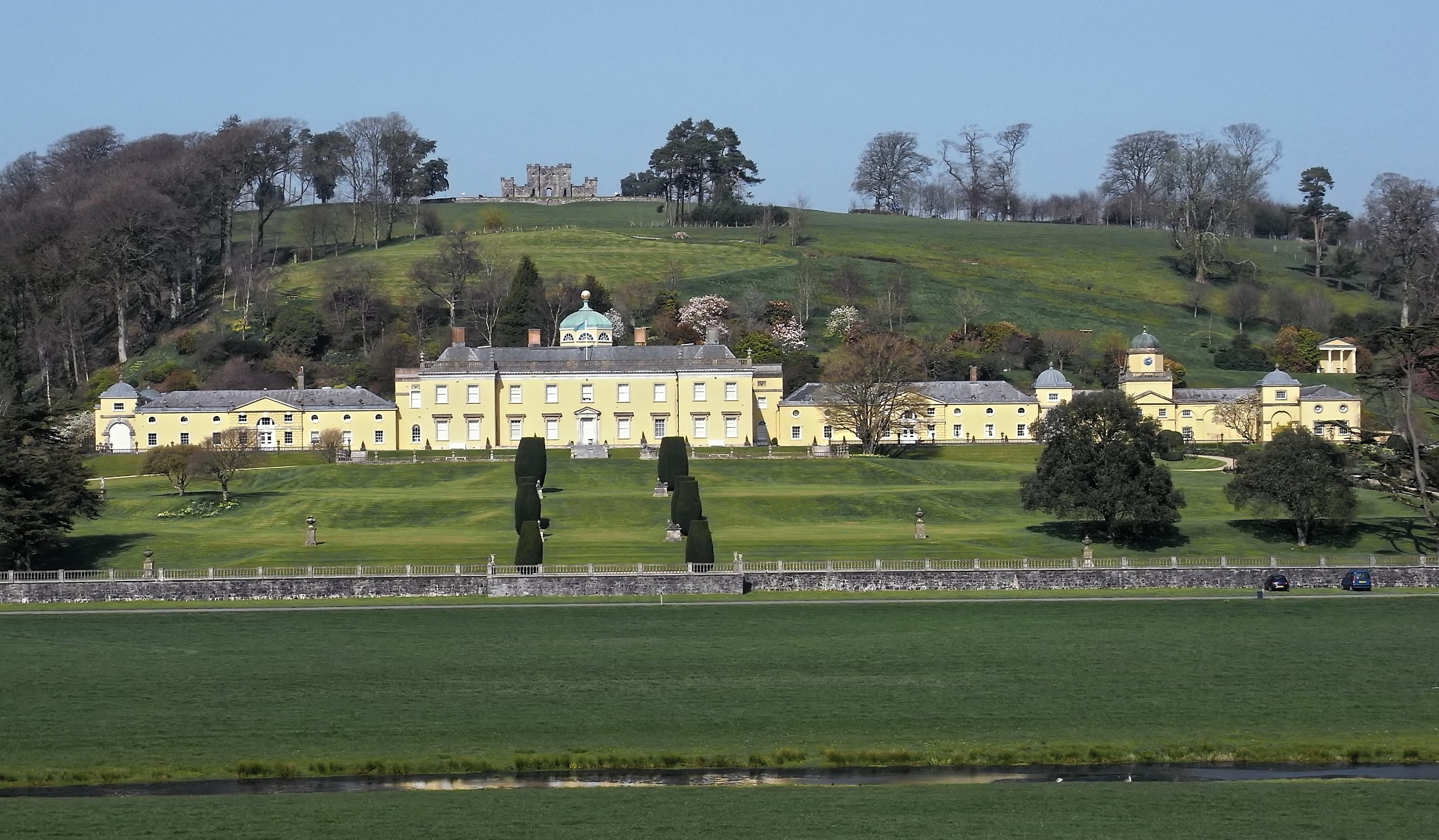
Castle Hill in 2014. The architectural "sham castle" is on the hill behind

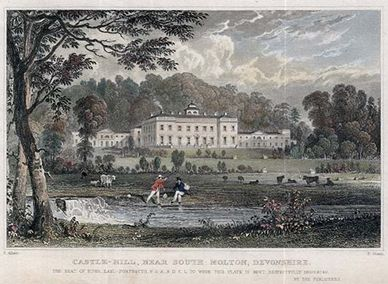
Engraving of Castle-Hill, 1830

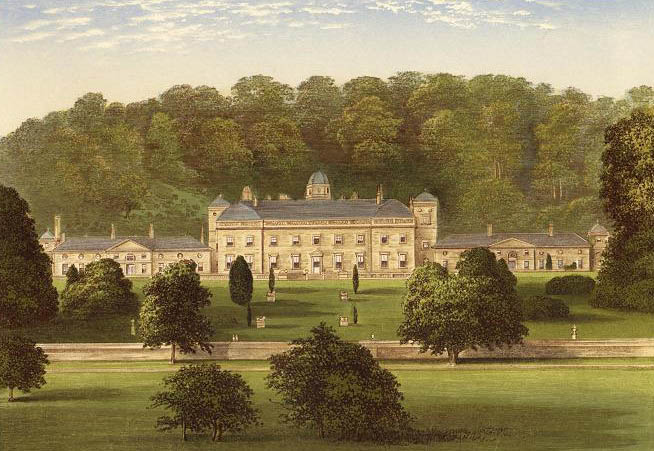
Castle Hill in 1880, south facade, published in Morris's "Country Seats"

Arms of Fortescue: Azure, a bend engrailed argent plain cotised or. Latin canting motto: Forte Scutum Salus Ducum ("A Strong Shield is the Salvation of Leaders").

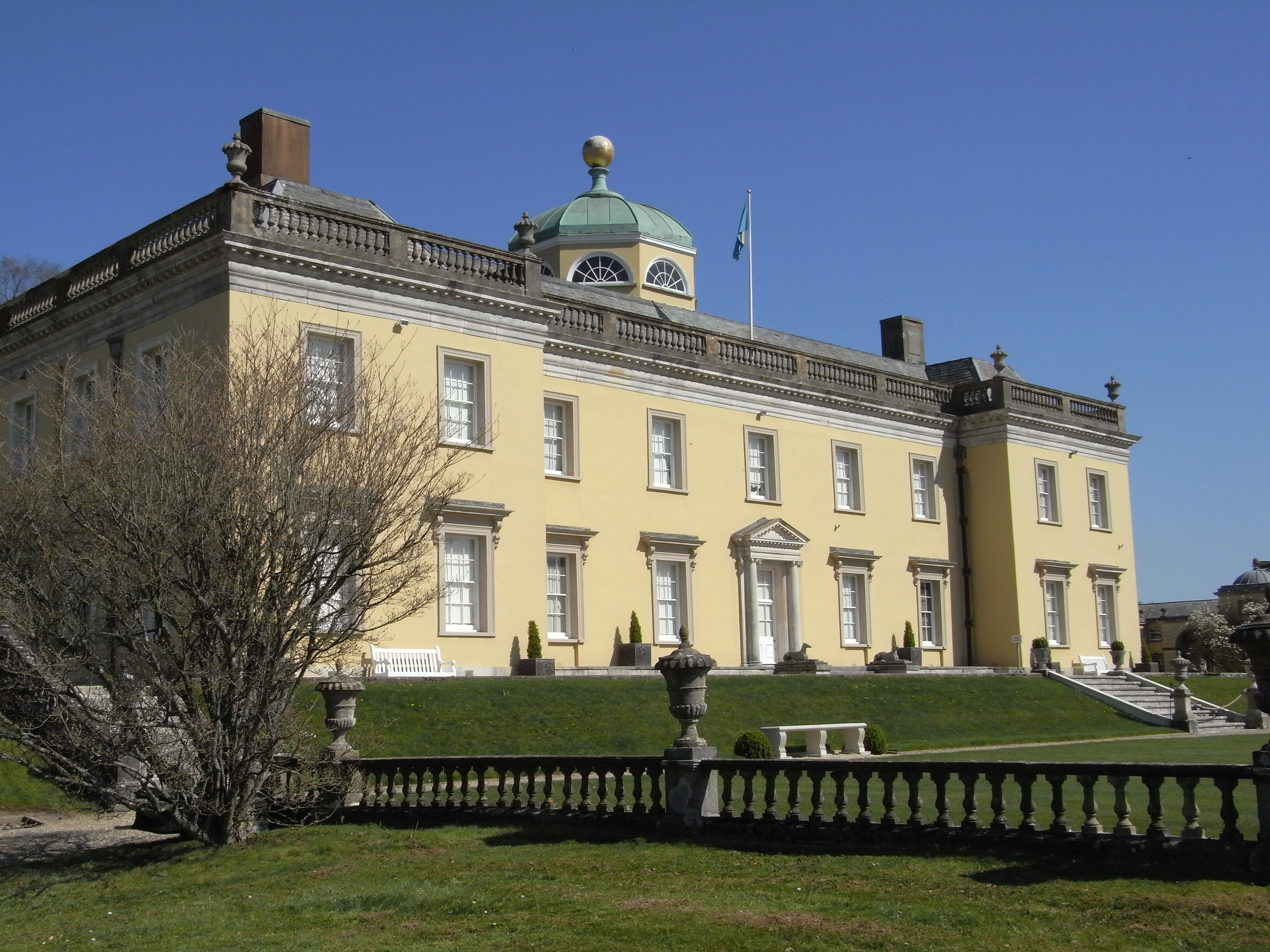
Castle Hill, main range, viewed from SW

Castle Hill in the parish of Filleigh in North Devon, is an early Neo-Palladian country house situated 3 miles (5 kilometres) north-west of South Molton and 8 mi (13 km) south-east of Barnstaple. It was built in 1730 by Hugh Fortescue, 14th Baron Clinton (1696–1751), who was later created in 1751 1st Baron Fortescue and 1st Earl of Clinton, the son of Hugh Fortescue (died 1719), lord of the manor of Filleigh, Weare Giffard, etc., whose family is earliest recorded as residing in the 12th century at the manor of Whympston in the parish of Modbury in South Devon. The Fortescue family became major land owners, influential in British and West Country history. Castle Hill is a rare example in Devon of an 18th-century country mansion "on the grand scale".

The house was substantially reconstructed following a disastrous fire in 1934. It was designated a Grade II* listed building in 1967. The park and gardens are Grade I listed in the National Register of Historic Parks and Gardens. Today the property is leased by Eleanor, Countess of Arran (born 1949), the granddaughter of Hugh Fortescue, 5th Earl Fortescue (1888–1958).

== Predecessor ==
The manor of Filleigh has been held by the Fortescue family since the 15th century, although the family's main seat until the late 17th century was Weare Giffard, some 12 mi (19 km) to the west. An older late Tudor manor house on the site was re-modelled in 1684 by Arthur Fortescue and his son Hugh Fortescue (died 1719). A plaque to the left of the north entrance front of the main range is inscribed in Latin: Re-Edificat(us) Per Arthur Fortescue AR(miger) AD 1684 ("Re-built by Arthur Fortescue, esquire, AD 1684").

Lady Fortescue kept a record of the rainfall at Filleigh Castle Hill. A project being carried out at the University of Reading is recording handwritten weather records from the past. Her name is shown as being the observer making the records at Filleigh Castle Hill.

== Palladian rebuilding ==
Hugh Fortescue (1696–1751), who in 1721 inherited the title 14th Baron Clinton, via his mother, consulted Lord Burlington (1694–1753), the pioneer and arbiter of Palladianism in England, on the design of his proposed new mansion. In 1728/9 he appointed Burlington's favoured builder Roger Morris to reface the house in Portland stone. The former hall was remodelled as a double-height saloon.

== 19th-century additions ==
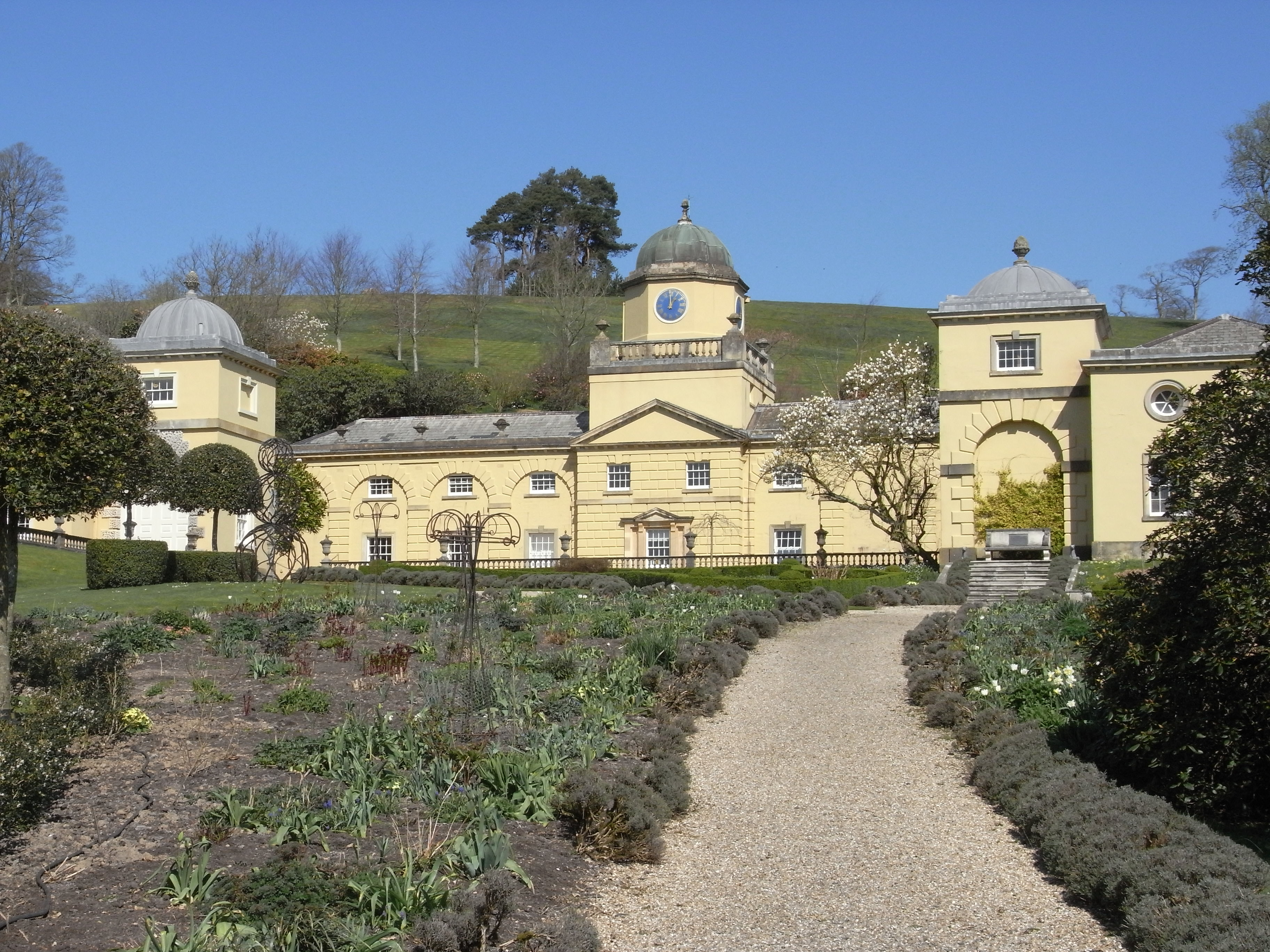
Service wing to east side of house, 1861, to design of Blore, with clock tower above. Viewed from south

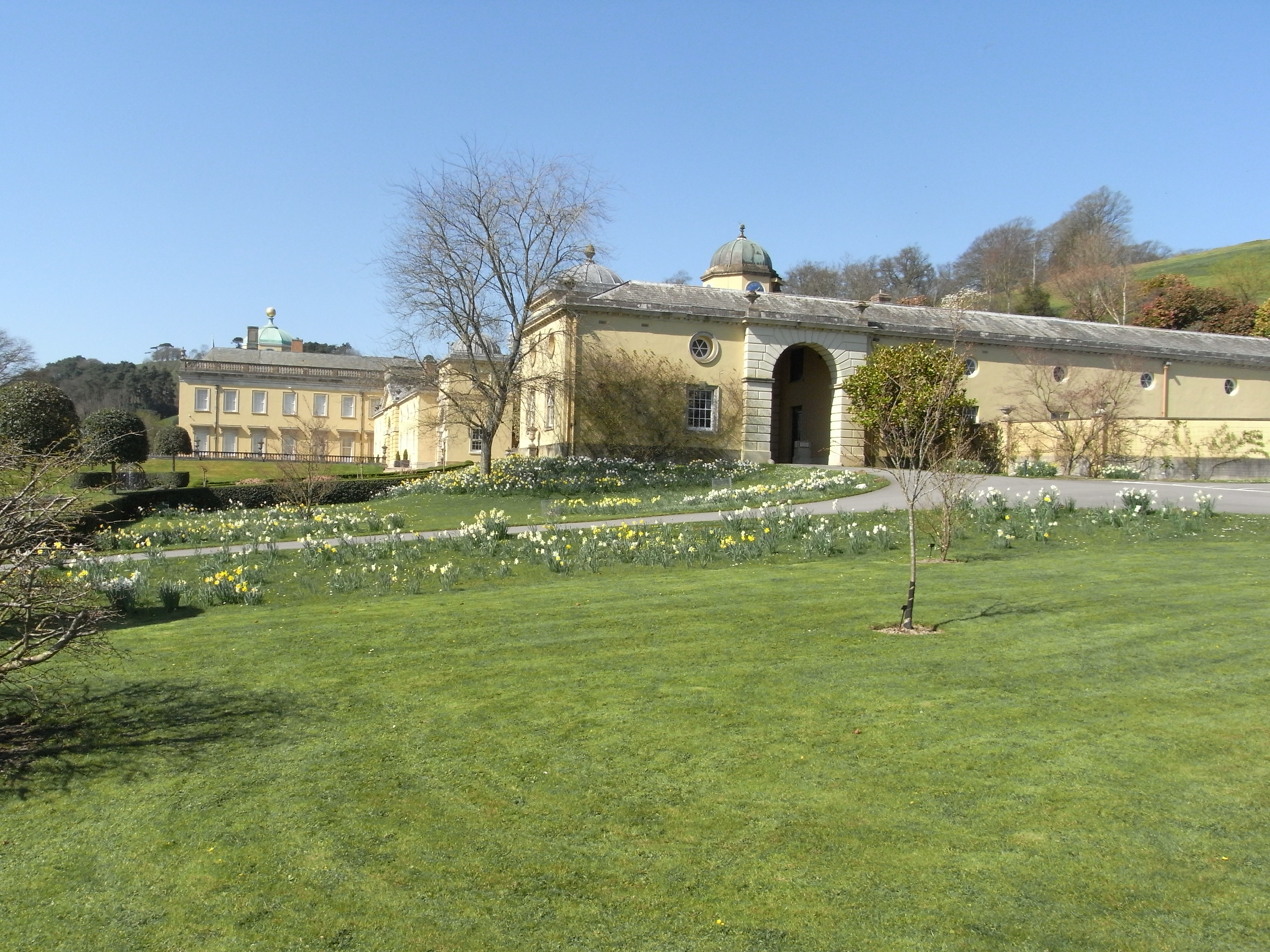
The stable block, viewed from the east. The main vehicular entrance to the house is through the large arch along a road which passes directly in front of the service block, the clock tower of which can be seen behind. The main range is visible to the left (south).

A circular library was added in the early 19th century. In 1841 the architect Edward Blore (1787–1879) added a porte-cochere on the north side of the main range, now demolished and replaced in 1974 by an entrance porch to the design of Raymond Erith. Blore also refashioned the entrance hall and stairs and added a top storey with mansard roof. In 1861 Blore added at the east side of the house service wings and stables, thus considerably elongating the southern appearance of the building beyond the east wing. The service wing is set back from the east wing by the width of the entry road which passes directly in front of it, and is topped in its centre by a clock tower. Adjoining it on its east end and extending backwards to give the ensemble an L-shape, is Blore's stable block. This has small circular windows with portrait busts, and is pierced on its long eastern face by the imposing full height main entrance arch, through which vehicles pass and continue past the front of the service wing and through decorative inner gates into the courtyard situated between the north facade of the main range and the steep and rocky hillside.

== 1934 fire damage ==
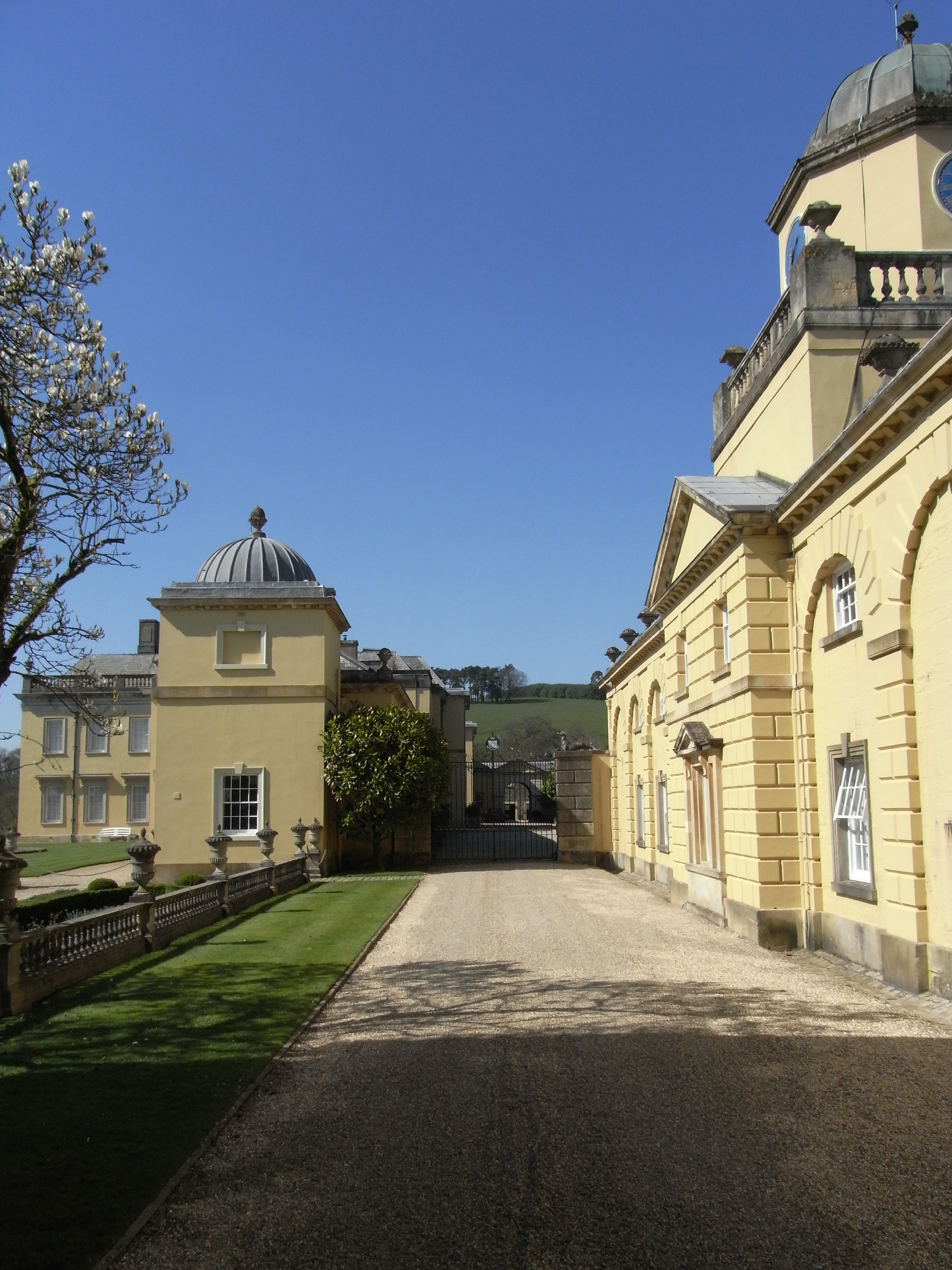
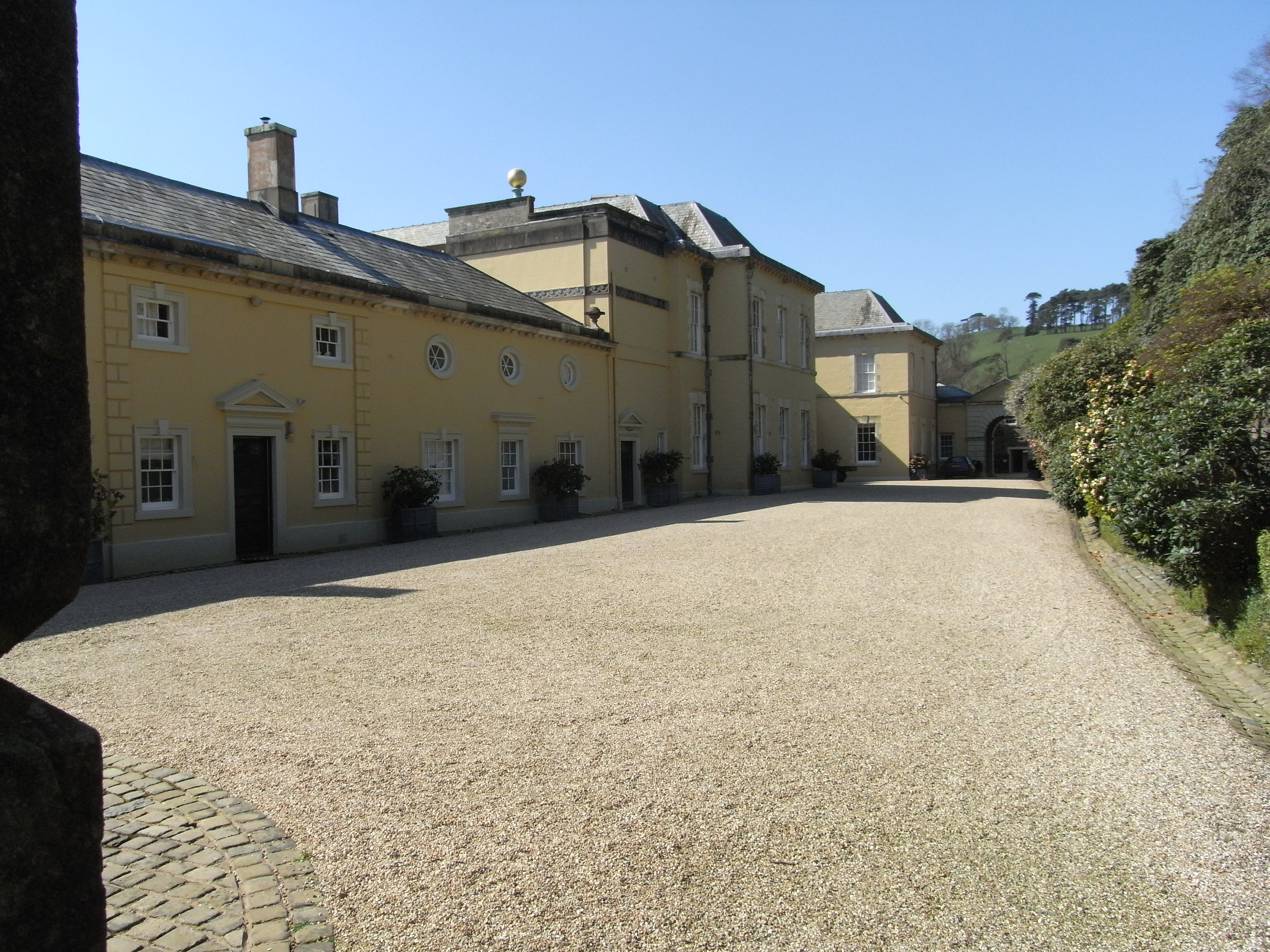
Left: Castle Hill, entry approach road viewed from under entrance arch looking west towards decorative iron gates to inner courtyard, Service Block to right, beyond which is (right): North Front and main entrance courtyard, viewed westwards from gates from service courtyard, situated behind service block.

A major fire broke out in the early morning of 9 March 1934 and burned for two days. It destroyed much of the interior and killed two members of staff, the housekeeper and a maid. The 5th Earl had recently installed a central heating system, the boiler of which, situated underneath the library floor, had malfunctioned. After the fire, the house was restored to the 18th-century style by Lord Gerald Wellesley (1885–1972), soldier, diplomat and architect, with Trenwith Wills. Although 49 paintings, including many Fortescue family portraits, were saved from the fire with only minor smoke damage, all were shortly afterwards destroyed by fire when the delivery lorry returning them from the restorer caught fire whilst parked overnight in a garage pending their return to Castle Hill.

== Grounds ==
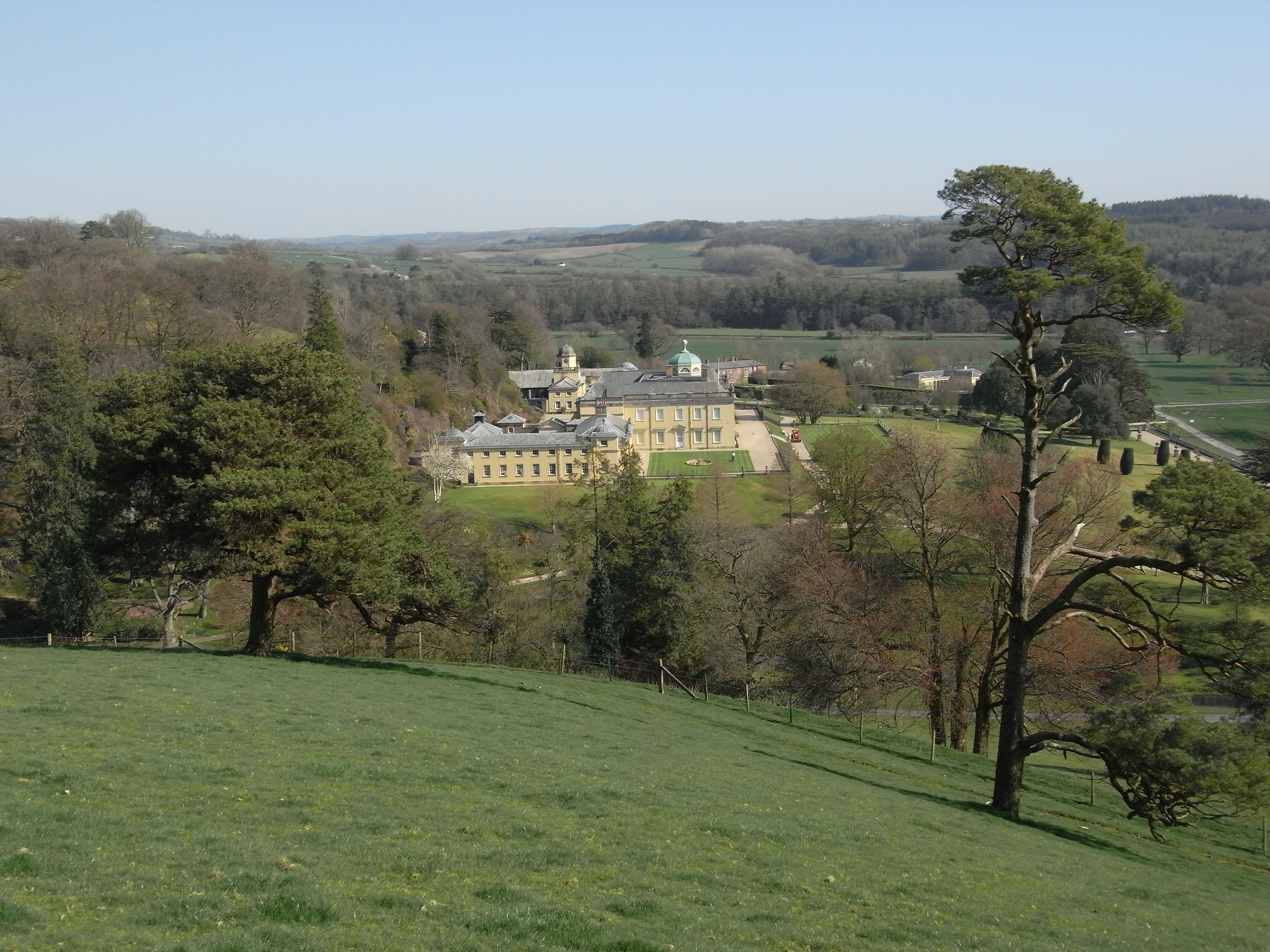
Castle Hill, panoramic view of west side, seen from Oxford Down Hill looking eastwards. A large "Peace Clump" of Scots Pine trees was planted on Oxford Down by the 4th Earl in 1919 to commemorate the end of World War I.

The house is surrounded by landscaped grounds containing many picturesque structures and decorative points-de-vue. The former include three small classical-style Greek temples, the Sunrise Temple (1831), the Sunset Temple (1831) and Satyr's Temple (1861); the Traveller's Cross, erected in 1831, but formerly situated on a roadside near North Aller; Ugley Bridge (1861), an imitation of an old Devon packhorse bridge; The Sybils' Cave (1861), filled in while the house served as a home for evacuated children during World War II, but since re-opened. The ancient parish church formerly situated next to the former pre-Palladian manor house was demolished in 1732 by Lord Clinton with the licence of Stephen Weston, Bishop of Exeter, and was rebuilt to a new design in its present position some 1 mi (1.6 km) to the west of the house, visible from the terrace. This made available an unencumbered site for the planned landscaping. Other points-de-vue include the Sham Castle, the Triumphal Arch, the Ebrington Tower and the Sham Village (now demolished).

=== Sham castle ===
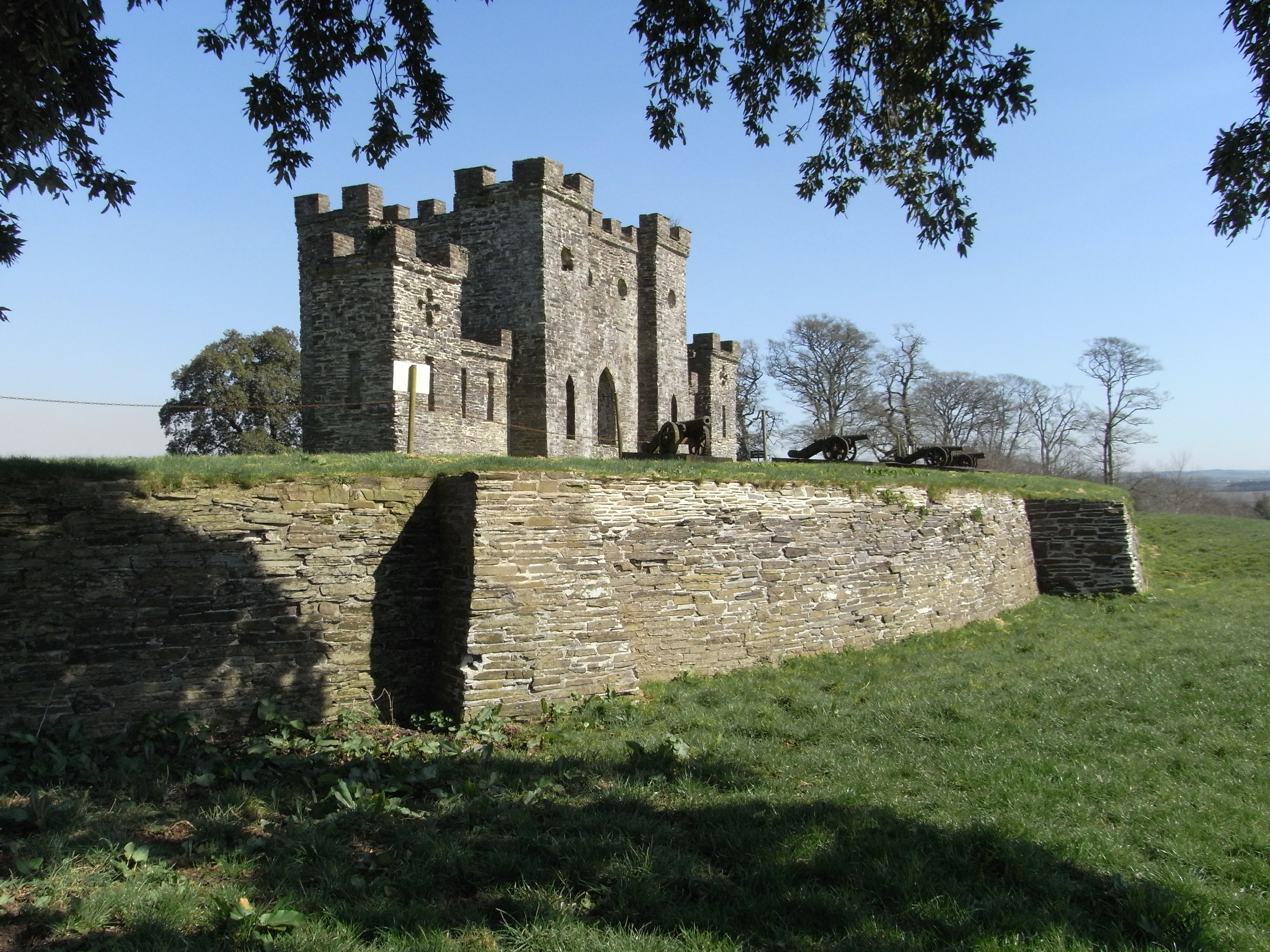
Architectural "Sham Castle" on top of hill to immediate north of house, with decorative cannon aimed southward, viewed from SW

A sham castle dating from about 1746 occupies the hill behind the house to the north, possibly inspired by Vanbrugh, and is said to be the feature which gave the house its name. When Lord Lieutenant of Devon, Hugh Fortescue, 4th Earl Fortescue (1854–1932) flew the Fortescue standard from the castle, he noted in his diary that his ancestor Matthew Fortescue, 2nd Baron Fortescue (d.1785) had "armed" it, as a modern reference to which in 1991 Lady Margaret Fortescue installed the decorative cannon now present on its south lawn. It served for a while as a banqueting hall, at which time it was lined with oak panelling from nearby North Aller House, which in 1812 was moved on to Weare Giffard Hall. The building was later converted into a dwelling house, originally intended for a couple to tend the tame pheasants, and later lived in by the huntsman of the Fortescue Harriers, Abraham Moggeridge. From the castle can be seen to the west Lundy Island and at a closer distance, Bampfylde Clump to the north in North Molton parish.

=== Triumphal arch ===
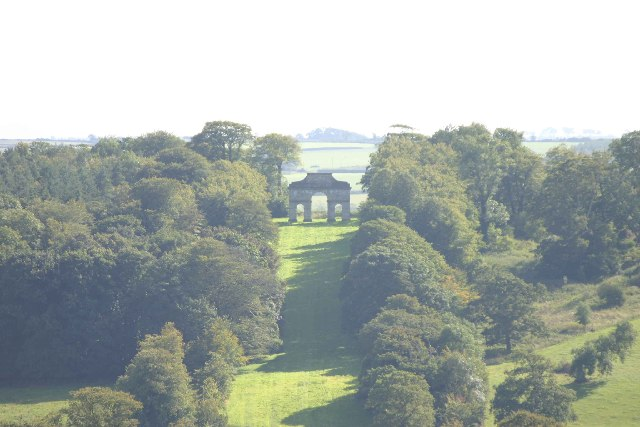
Triumphal Arch on top of hill opposite south front of house, here viewed from the Sham Castle

The original Triumphal Arch, situated on top of the hill 1/2 mile (800 metres) opposite the south front of the house and on the same axis as the sham castle behind, was built by Lord Clinton in 1730. It had been allowed to become covered in ivy and in 1951 collapsed during a strong wind. Following the death of both her parents in 1958, Lady Margaret Fortescue in 1961 rebuilt the Arch in its original form in their memory. Financial contributions were made by the tenants of the estate and by friends of the family. The modern structure is of reinforced concrete faced with the original stone.

=== Sham village ===
A sham village, now demolished, with church tower was constructed by Lord Clinton on the horizon at High Bray.

=== Ebrington Tower ===
The Ebrington Tower was built in 1992 by Lady Margaret Fortescue on the site of the former Sham Village. The tower was built in memory of her only brother Viscount Ebrington, 21, who was killed in 1942 in action with the Royal Scots Greys at the Battle of El Alamein in Egypt, and whose mural memorial marble tablet can be seen in the Fortescue Chapel in Filleigh Church. Due to his loss, on the death of his father the 5th Earl in 1958, the family titles passed by law to the latter's younger brother, but in the absence of an entail, the Castle Hill and Weare Giffard estates he was free to bequeath to his two daughters. The tower, made from local stone, consists of three stories and is crenellated on top. It was designed by Hal Moggridge who had organised much of the reparatory landscaping work following the great storm of 1990, and was built by Graham Davey.

== Descent to Countess of Arran ==
Arms of Gore family, Earls of Arran: Gules, a fesse between three crosses fitchée or

The last Earl Fortescue to own Castle Hill was Hugh Fortescue, 5th Earl Fortescue (1888–1958) who died in June 1958, aged 70. As he had no surviving male issue he was succeeded in the earldom by his younger brother, Denzil Fortescue, 6th Earl Fortescue. However the 5th Earl bequeathed Castle Hill, his principal seat, to his elder surviving daughter, Lady Margaret Fortescue (born 1923). Lady Margaret had married in 1948 Bernard van Cutsem, and had issue. It is now the home of her daughter Eleanor, Countess of Arran (born 1949), who married on 28 September 1974 Arthur Gore, 9th Earl of Arran (born 1938). She was awarded the MBE in the Queen's Birthday Honours 2008. They have two daughters, Lady Laura Duckworth-Chad and Lady Lucy Fortescue-Gore.

== Public access ==
The gardens are open to the public for much of the year. The house is not open to the public but occasional guided tours for small groups are arranged on application. The Grand Hall of the house and three other main rooms are, however, available for civil wedding ceremonies, and marquee receptions are also provided. A conference room with a capacity for 100 people is available for hire.

== Sources ==
- Cherry, Bridget & Pevsner, Nikolaus, The Buildings of England: Devon, London, 2004, Castle Hill, Filleigh, pp. 247–249
- Lauder, Rosemary, Devon Families, Tiverton, 2002, Fortescue, pp. 75–82
- Filleigh History Group & Arran, Countess of, The Secrets of Castle Hill Gardens, 2003. (Booklet for sale on site)
