= Modbury =

Town in Devon, England

Coordinates: 50.349111°N 3.886896°W

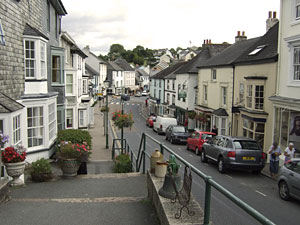
- Church Street, Modbury

- Location within Devon
- Population: 1,454 (2001)
- OS grid reference: SX63835946
  - London: 181 mi (291 km)
- Civil parish: Modbury
- District: South Hams
- Shire county: Devon
- Region: South West
- Country: England
- Sovereign state: United Kingdom
- Post town: IVYBRIDGE
- Postcode district: PL21
- Dialling code: 01548
- Police: Devon and Cornwall
- Fire: Devon and Somerset
- Ambulance: South Western
- UK Parliament: South West Devon
- Website: Modbury Parish Council website

Modbury is a Town, ecclesiastical parish, civil parish and former manor in the South Hams district of the county of Devon in England."market town", as from at least 1199 the lord of the manor has held the right to hold a regular market. The town is situated on the A379 road, which links it to Plymouth and Kingsbridge. The current parish population is approximately 1,500.

== Etymology ==
The name Modbury is a corruption of the Anglo-Saxon name, Moot burgh from 'Moot' meaning either 'Mud' or 'meeting' and 'bury' meaning 'fortified enclosure'.

== History ==
Modbury is recorded in the Domesday Book of 1086. It has had permission to hold a weekly fair since before 1199. The population of the town was greatly reduced as a consequence of the Black Death in the 14th century.

=== Civil war ===
Modbury was the site of two battles in the English Civil War. The first battle was a surprise attack by a mounted Parliamentarian force led by Sir William Ruthven that moved under cover of darkness from Plymouth via Ivybridge on 7 December 1642. In the early morning charge they routed a mostly untrained Royalist force that had gathered in the town, where Sir Ralph Hopton, the King's senior commander in the West Country, was holding council at the manor house of Champernowne Court. The house was badly damaged by fire, Hopton escaped but many notable Devon Royalists were captured.

The second Battle of Modbury occurred on 22 February 1643 when the Royalists forces, expecting an attack by Parliamentarian forces assembled at nearby Kingsbridge, had fortified the town. Outnumbered approximately four to one, and running short of ammunition, the royalists retreated. This victory was largely instrumental in the lifting of the Siege of Plymouth, and the driving of the encircling Royalist forces into Cornwall.

=== 19th century ===
By 1801, the population of Modbury had risen to 1,813, with almost half engaged in the wool trade. The impact of the mechanisation of the wool industry had a dramatic effect on the economic prosperity and population of the town from the mid-1820s. Many workers left the town and headed to large cities in search of employment, while others left the country altogether, emigrating to America.

The railway line bypassed Modbury, contributing still further to this decline. Modbury remained an important market town until as late as 1944 when the cattle market ceased.

== Manor ==
The manor of Modbury was held from the time of Domesday Book by the Vautort family, and passed successively to the families of Okeston and Champernowne. In Domesday Book it's listed as two separate parts; the principal one as Motbilie, one of the holdings of Robert, Count of Mortain, half-brother of William the Conqueror. Robert's tenant was one of his important Anglo-Norman followers, Reginald I de Vautort. Later, Sir Roger de Vautort granted the manor, together with Bridford, to Sir Alexander de Okeston, of Okeston (alias Oxton), Devon, the second husband of Joan de Vautort, widow of Ralph de Vautort, Sir Roger's elder brother. Joan de Vautort was the mistress of Richard, 1st Earl of Cornwall (1209–1272), second son of King John. By Okeston she had a son Sir James Okeston, who before he died childless named as his heir the son of his half-sister Joan, daughter of Earl Richard and wife of Richard Champernowne of Clyst Champernowne, near Exeter, Devon. The Champernown family was thenceforth seated at Modbury. Sir James Okeston (son of Sir Alexander de Okeston) granted Bridford to Richard Champernowne, as evidenced in a deed dated 1314

The manor house, last occupied by the Champernowne family and known as "Court House", was situated on the north side of the parish church of St George, on or near the site of Modbury Priory, founded in the 12th century by the Vautort lords of the manor. It was destroyed during the Civil War (1642–1651) and the remnants were sold for building materials in 1705.

Modbury Manor lends its name to the New England town of Madbury, New Hampshire. Located in the Southeastern region of the state, Madbury was settled by Sir Francis Champernowne who originally gave the name to his farm located there.

== Church ==
The parish Church of St George is Grade I listed. The main body of the church is fourteenth century and is constructed of coursed rubble with granite dressings beneath slate roofs. The tower has angle buttresses and a broach spire believed to have been struck by lightning in AD 1621 and rebuilt as a copy of the original. The nave has a wagon roof, as do the aisles and transepts, the Lady Chapel, the Vestry, and the chancel. Dendrochronological analysis suggest the church was reroofed in the sixteenth century. The church was placed on Historic England's Heritage at Risk Register in 2013 with concerns about roof damage and damp. A 2015 Heritage Lottery Fund grant led to an extensive programme of roof repairs and restoration.

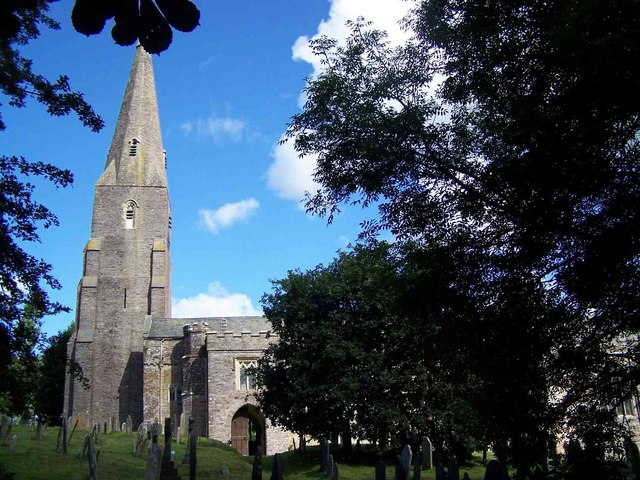

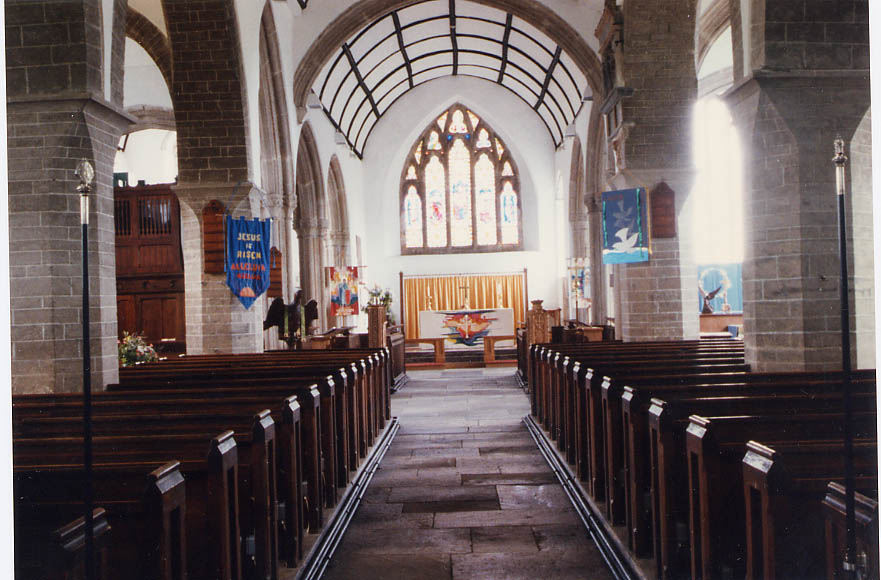
The exterior and interior of Modbury's parish church of Saint George.

== Historic estates ==
=== Little Modbury ===
The estate of Little Modbury, formerly owned by the le Rouse (le Rous) Family, was subdivided in the 18th century, and now is just a locale south of the village, although Little Modbury Farm still maintains the name.

=== Orcheton ===
Orcheton within the parish was long a seat of the Prideaux family. The much mutilated effigy survives in the Orcheton (or Prideaux) aisle of Modbury Church of Sir John Prideaux (c.1347-1403) of Orcheton, twice a Member of Parliament for Devon in 1383 and 1388.

=== Shilstone ===
In the parish, just outside the village of Modbury, is Shilstone Manor, a restored Georgian manor house on the estate of Silfestana, a property listed in Domesday Book, also known as "Shivelston". At the time of Domesday Book it was in the demise of Osbern de Salceid. The Hill family (originally "de la Hille") owned the estate from the late 14th century, notably Judge Robert Hill and his son Robert Hill II, Sheriff of Devonshire, until around 1614 when the fortunes of that branch of the Hill family had declined, the estate was acquired by the Savery family, whose members included members of Parliament, and who were engaged in both farming and trade.

In the 20th century the house had fallen into disrepair and was being used as a farmhouse. In the early 2000s it was restored to its Georgian glory. The restoration won several awards including Country Life's ‘Restoration of the Century’ award and The Georgian Group's ‘New Building in the Classical Tradition’ award for restoring the "1800 remodelling of mediaeval house". The historic gardens at Shilstone have also been restored.

The English inventor Thomas Savery, who invented a pioneering steam pump, was born about 1650 at the old medieval manor at Shilstone.

=== Wympston ===
Whympston (Wimpston) in the parish of Modbury is a historic manor. King John granted the estate to John Fortescue in 1209. It became the earliest English seat of the prominent Norman family of Fortescue, influential in British and West Country history, which survives today as Earl Fortescue, seated in Gloucestershire, but until recently seated at Castle Hill in Devon.

=== Yarnacombe ===
Yarnacombe in the parish of Modbury is a historic manor, once belonging to the Hart Family, and subsequently to the attorney W. Mackworth Praed.

== Plastic bag ban ==
In April 2007 local traders declared that for environmental reasons, they would no longer give customers plastic bags. This initiative led to other communities, such as Ilam in Staffordshire and Hebden Bridge in West Yorkshire, pursuing similar enterprises.

== Modbury Rovers Junior F.C. ==
Modbury has a recreation field with a football pitch, tennis courts and a tarmac all-weather surface used mainly for skateboarding. This is the home of Modbury Rovers a Junior football club, who compete in the FA Pioneer Youth and other local leagues.

== Notable former residents ==
- Katherine 'Kat' Ashley née Champernowne (? – 1565) governess to Elizabeth I was probably born in or near the village
- Sir George Baker, 1st Baronet (1 January 1722 – 15 June 1809), physician to King George III, was born in the town
- William Battie (sometimes spelt Batty), president of the Royal College of Physicians in 1764 was born in the town
- Thomas Savery (c. 1650 – 15 May 1715) inventor of the first commercially used steam-powered device, a steam pump, was born at Shilstone

== See also ==
- Modbury Priory
