= Ebrington Manor =

Grade II listed manor house in Gloucestershire, England

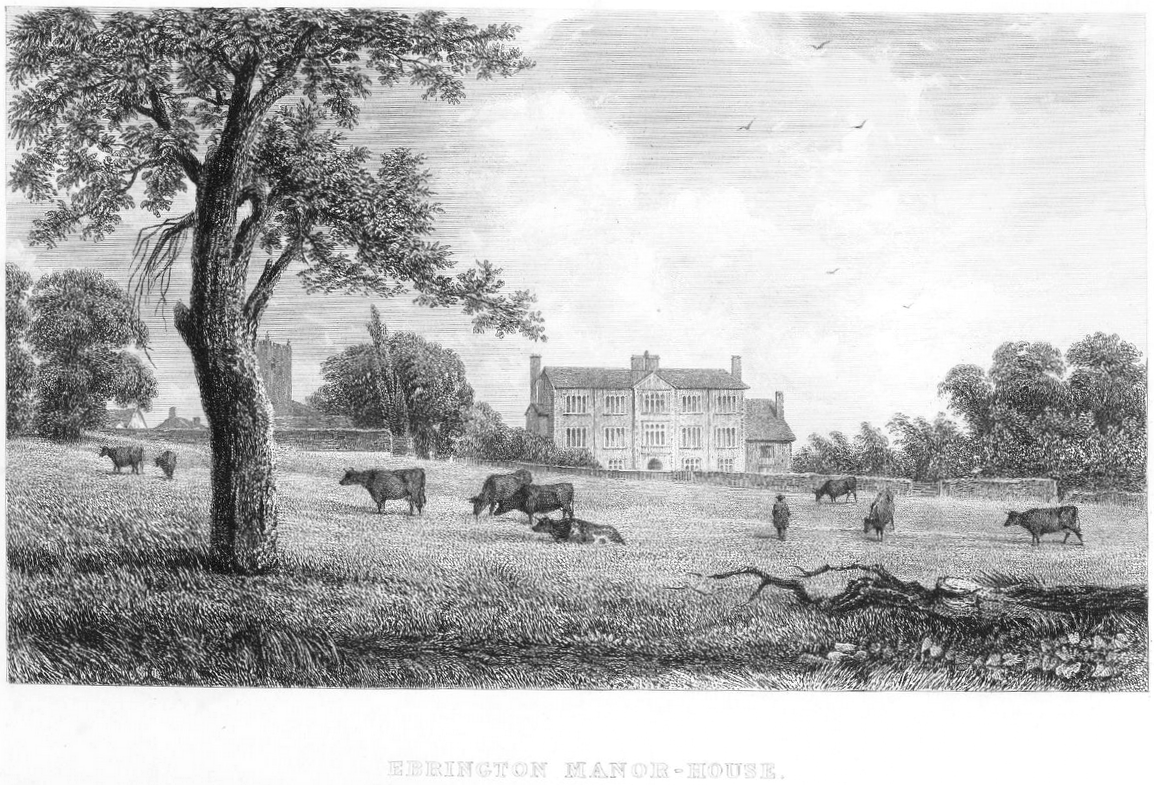
- Ebrington Manor House, west front, in a 19th-century engraving. St Eadburgha's Church, the parish church of Ebrington, is just visible at left

- Location in Gloucestershire
- 52°03′27″N 01°44′01.68″W
- Location: Ebrington, Gloucestershire, England

Ebrington Manor is a grade II listed manor house in the parish of Ebrington in Gloucestershire, England. Since 1476 it has been a seat of the Fortescue family, since 1789 the Earls Fortescue.

== Location ==
It is located within the village of Ebrington in Gloucestershire, immediately to the south-west of the parish church of Ebrington.

== History ==
The house dates back to the fourteenth or fifteenth century, and was significantly altered twice, in the seventeenth and nineteenth centuries. It was built on land purchased by Sir John Fortescue (c.1394-1479), who was Chief Justice of the King's Bench.

An heraldic cartouche above the entrance door displays the arms of Fortescue impaling Aylmer, representing Hugh Fortescue (1665–1719), and his second wife Lucy Aylmer, whom he married after 1708, a daughter of Matthew Aylmer, 1st Baron Aylmer (circa 1650–1720), grandparents of Hugh Fortescue, 1st Earl Fortescue (1753-1841).

During World War II the house was run by the American Red Cross for rest and recuperation for United States Army Air Forces bomber crews. In 1970 the house was the location of an attempted murder and arson.

The current Earl has three daughters and no sons. Therefore the family has been involved in a campaign to change inheritance laws.

It was listed as a grade II building by English Heritage on 25 August 1960.

== Architecture ==
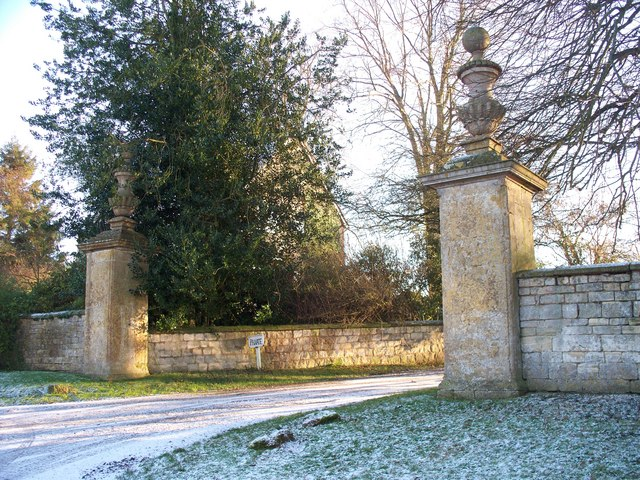
Entrance gate piers

The limestone building has grey slate roofs and a central five-flue chimney. The main body of the house includes a 17th-century hall and balustraded gallery. There is extensive plasterwork throughout the house, some of which was moved from a summer house in the grounds. The main entrance gate piers and the summer-house in the grounds are both grade II* listed buildings. The garden was laid out in the 1940s.
