= George Fortescue (MP) =

British military officer and Whig politician

George Matthew Fortescue (Note: The second forename is spelled Mathew (one T) by The History of Parliament, but Matthew (two Ts) on his gravestone.) (21 May 1791 – 24 January 1877) was a British military officer and Whig politician, who served as MP for Hindon 1826–1831.

Fortescue was the son of Hugh Fortescue, 1st Earl Fortescue and his wife Hester Grenville, daughter of Prime Minister George Grenville.

In the army, Fortescue served in India and reached the rank of captain. Due to ill health, he took half-pay in 1816.

Fortescue was elected unopposed as one of the two MPs for Hindon in the 1826 and 1830 elections. He voted for Lord John Russell's first Reform Bill in March 1831 (which would have abolished the constituency of Hindon if it had passed), and stood down at the 1831 election which followed the bill's defeat.

He was buried at Boconnoc Church.

== Family ==
On 19 February 1833, he married Lady Louisa Elizabeth Ryder, daughter of Dudley Ryder, 1st Earl of Harrowby. They had four sons and four daughters:

- Louisa Susan Anne Fortescue (1833–1864), married William Westby Moore
- George Grenville Fortescue (1835–1856)
- Harriet Eleanor Fortescue (1836–1924), married Admiral Sir Augustus Phillimore
- Hugh Granville Fortescue (1838–1875), Captain in the Coldstream Guards
- Mary Fortescue (1840–1925), married Rev. Vernon Harcourt Aldham
- Elizabeth Frances Fortescue (1843–)
- Cyril Dudley Fortescue (1847–1890), Lieutenant-Colonel in the Coldstream Guards
- John Bevill Fortescue (1850–1938), barrister, High Sheriff of Cornwall in 1894

== Notes ==
Parliament of the United Kingdom
Preceded by John Plummer; Frederick Gough	Member of Parliament for Hindon; 1826–1831; With: Arthur Gough-Calthorpe (1826–30); John Weyland (1830–31)	Succeeded by Edward Stanley; John Weyland
