= John Holles =

John Holles may refer to:

- John Holles, 1st Duke of Newcastle-upon-Tyne (9 January 1662 – 15 July 1711)
- John Holles, 1st Earl of Clare (May 1564 – 4 October 1637)
- John Holles, 2nd Earl of Clare
