= Holles =

Holles is a surname. Notable people with the surname include:

- Denzil Holles, 1st Baron Holles (1599–1680), English statesman and writer, one of the "Five Members" (of Parliament) whose attempted arrest by King Charles I sparked the First English Civil War
- Denzil Holles, 3rd Baron Holles (1675–c. 1692), English noble and Member of Parliament (MP)
- Denzil Holles (MP) (c. 1538–1590) MP for East Retford
- Francis Holles, 2nd Baron Holles (1627–1690), English noble and MP
- Gervase Holles (1607–1675), English lawyer, antiquarian, and politician
- William Holles (1471?–1542), English merchant, Lord Mayor of London in 1539
- William Holles (MP) (1510–1591), MP for Nottinghamshire
