= William Holles (disambiguation) =

William Holles was Lord Mayor of London.

William Holles or Hollis may also refer to:

- William Holles (MP) (1510–1591), MP for Nottinghamshire
- William Hollis (1816–?), English cricketer

== See also ==
- William Holle, engraver
