= Holles (disambiguation) =

Holles may refer to:

- Holles, a surname (with a list of people of this name)
- Hölles, in the municipality of Matzendorf-Hölles, near Vienna, Austria
- Holles Street, Marylebone, London, a street
- National Maternity Hospital, Dublin, Ireland, often known as Holles Street Hospital or simply Holles
