= John Holles, 1st Earl of Clare =

English nobleman (1564–1637)

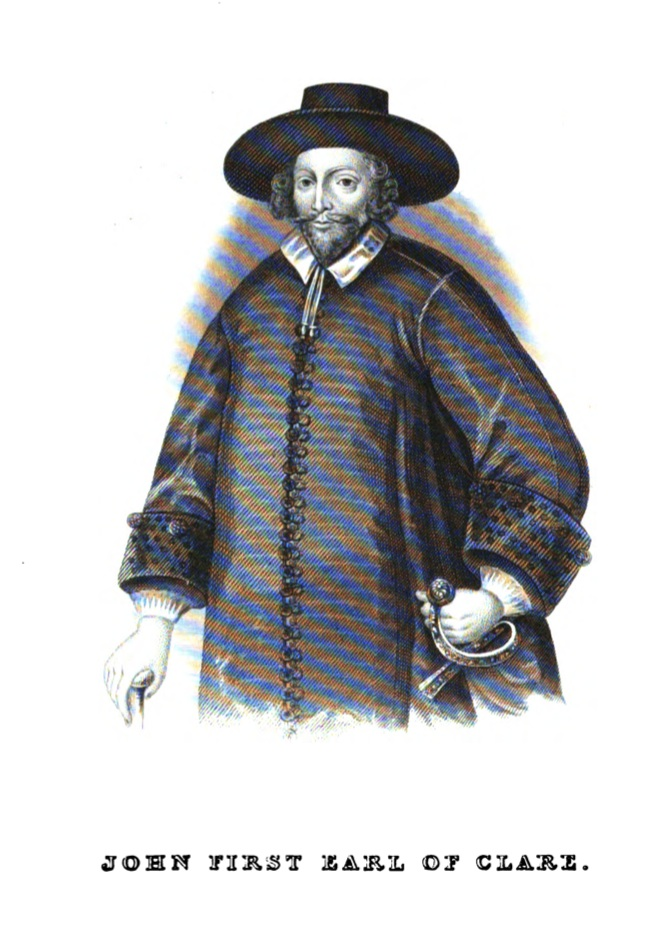
John Holles, First Earl of Clare

John Hollis, 1st Earl of Clare (May 1564 – 4 October 1637) was an English nobleman.

He was the son of Denzil Holles of Irby upon Humber and Eleanor Sheffield (daughter of Edmund Sheffield, 1st Baron Sheffield of Butterwick). His great-grandfather was William Hollyes, Lord Mayor of London. He was born at Haughton Hall, Nottinghamshire and educated at Christ's College, Cambridge from 1579, aged 12, after which he studied law at Gray's Inn from 1583. He was at Court until 1599.

Holles married Anne Stanhope (daughter of Sir Thomas Stanhope) on 23 May 1591 in Shelford, Nottinghamshire. Through his marriage to Anne, he inherited Thurland Hall in Nottingham which was later known as Clare Place. The family seat was at Haughton Hall in the parish of Bothamsall, which was demolished in the late eighteenth century. He served as High Sheriff of Nottinghamshire for 1591–92.

He was comptroller of the household of Prince Henry until the prince's death on 6 November 1612.

He was Member of Parliament for Nottinghamshire from 1604 to 1611 and from 1614 to 1616. He was created 1st Baron Haughton on 9 July 1616 and 1st Earl of Clare on 2 November 1624.

He died at home in Nottingham and is buried in St. Mary's Church, Nottingham. He had 6 sons and 4 daughters.

== Student of Architecture ==
Around 1604, he mentioned in a letter to the Earl of Northumberland that he was returning the earl's architecture books, including works by Vitruvius, Vignola and Guigati, which were required by Sir Edward Francis.

Northumberland had sent him other volumes by Jacques I Androuet du Cerceau, Philibert de l'Orme, Sebastiano Serlio, Wendel Dietterlin, and Leon Battista Alberti, and he knew that Holles had his own copy of the works of Palladio.

== Children ==
- Arabella Holles (1594–1631), married Thomas Wentworth, 1st Earl of Strafford
- John Holles, 2nd Earl of Clare (1595–1666), married Elizabeth Vere. MP for East Retford
- Robert Holles (1597-1666)
- Denzil Holles, 1st Baron Holles (1599–1680) MP for Mitchell
- Francis (1604–1622)
- Eleanore Holles, married Oliver Fitzwilliam, 1st Earl of Tyrconnel, became Countess of Tyrconnel, buried in St. Mary's Church, Nottingham 11 April 1681

== Ancestry ==
Ancestors of John Holles, 1st Earl of Clare

16. Thomas Holles
8. William Holles
17.
4. William Holles
18. George Scopham
9. Elizabeth Scopham
19.
2. Denzil Holles
20.
10. John Denzel
21.
5. Anne Denzell
22.
11.
23.
1. John Holles, 1st Earl of Clare
24. Robert Sheffield
12. Sir Robert Sheffield
25. Helen Delves
6. Edmund Sheffield, 1st Baron Sheffield
26. George Stanley, 9th Baron Strange
13. Jane Stanley
27. Joan le Strange, 9th Baroness Strange
3. Eleanor Sheffield
28. John de Vere
14. John de Vere, 15th Earl of Oxford
29. Alice Kilrington
7 Anne de Vere
30. Edward Trussell
15. Elizabeth Trussell, Countess of Oxford
31. Margaret Donne

== Coat of arms ==
Coat of arms of John Holles, 1st Earl of Clare
Coronet A coronet of an Earl Crest A boar passant azure tusked and bristled or. Escutcheon Ermine, two piles in point sable. Supporters Dexter: a lion or; sinister, a tiger or. Motto Spes audaces adjuvat.

Peerage of England
New title	Earl of Clare; 1624–1637	Succeeded by John Holles
New title	Baron Haughton; 1616–1637	Succeeded by John Holles
