= John Bell & Croyden =

Pharmacy in London

Coordinates: 51°30′59.57″N 0°8′56.64″W

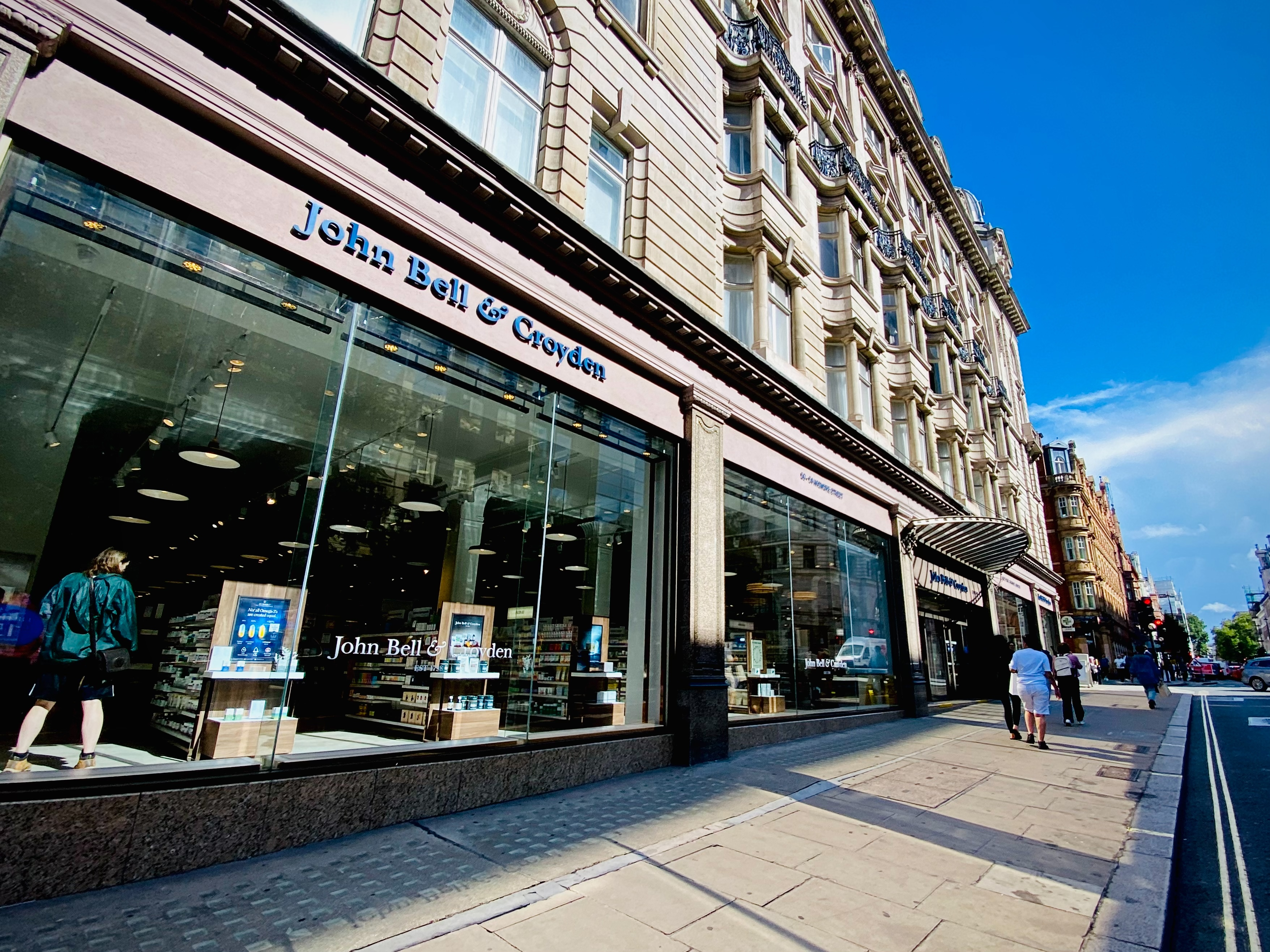
John Bell & Croyden shop on Wigmore Street

John Bell & Croyden is a pharmacy located on Wigmore Street, London. The company dates from 1798 and has been based on its current premises since 1912. It is currently owned by the Bestway Healthcare Group.

The shop was refurbished in 2015.
