= John Holles, 2nd Earl of Clare =

English nobleman (1595–1666)

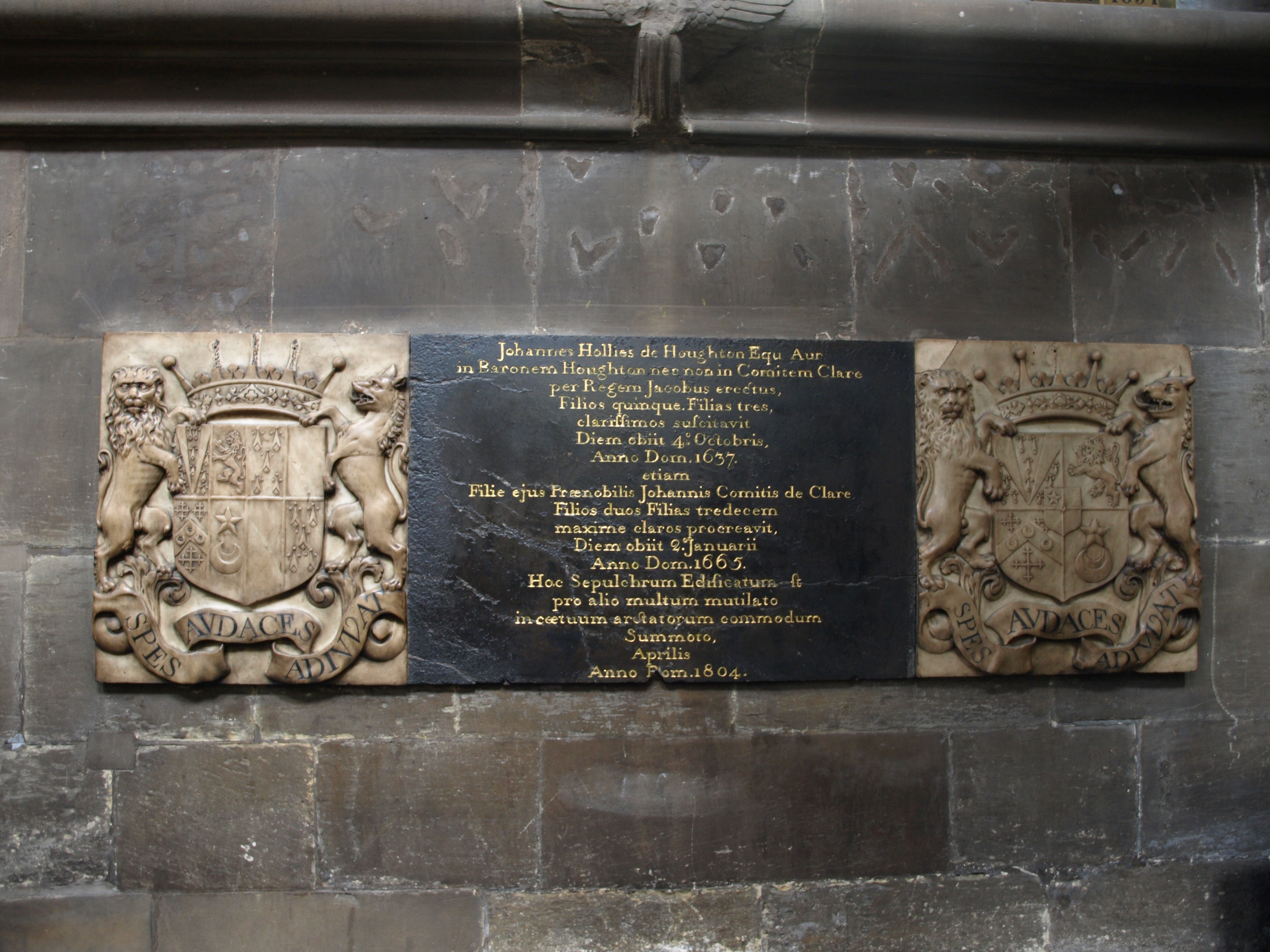
Memorial to the 1st and 2nd Earls of Clare in St Mary's Church, Nottingham

John Holles, 2nd Earl of Clare (13 June 1595 – 2 January 1666) was an English nobleman.

== Life ==
Holles was born in Haughton, Nottinghamshire, the eldest son of John Holles, 1st Earl of Clare and Anne Stanhope, and the brother of Denzil Holles, 1st Baron Holles. Styled Lord Haughton from 1624, he was member of parliament for East Retford in three parliaments (1623–1626) before succeeding to the peerage in 1637.

During the Thirty Years' War, at the siege of Bois-le-Duc in 1629, he served as a volunteer under the command of his father-in-law, Horace Vere, 1st Baron Vere of Tilbury.

Although he had quarrelled with Thomas Wentworth, 1st Earl of Strafford, who had married his sister, Arabella, in 1641 he opposed the Earl of Strafford's impeachment in the House of Lords, and during the trial asked several questions favourable to his defence. After Parliament sentenced Strafford to death by attainder, he pleaded hard with King Charles I for Strafford's life, but without success.

He took some part in the Civil War, but "he was very often of both parties, and never advantaged either". His attitude has been described as one of "dubious neutrality". He was made Recorder of Nottingham in 1642. After the Restoration, he gained a pardon from King Charles II.

== Family ==
Holles married Elizabeth Vere, daughter of Horace Vere, 1st Baron Vere of Tilbury, on 4 September 1626. They had eight children:

- John Holles, died young
- Gilbert Holles, 3rd Earl of Clare (1633–1689)
- Lady Anne Holles (1635 – 1707), married Edward Clinton, Lord Clinton
- Lady Eleanor Holles (1636 – 1709), whose will endowed Lady Eleanor Holles School.
- Lady Elizabeth Holles (1638 – 1666), married Wentworth FitzGerald, 17th Earl of Kildare
- Lady Arabella Holles (1639 – 1707), married Sir Edward Rossiter of Somerley
- Lady Susan Holles (1640 – bef May 1710), married c. July 1663 Sir John Lort, 2nd Baronet
- Lady Diana Holles (1641 – 1716), married Harry Bridges of Keynsham
- Lady Penelope Holles (1643 – 1684), married on 13 April 1667 Sir James Langham, 2nd Baronet

Holles is buried in St. Mary's Church, Nottingham.

== Coat of arms ==
Coat of arms of John Holles, 2nd Earl of Clare
Coronet A coronet of an Earl Crest A boar passant azure tusked and bristled or. Escutcheon Ermine, two piles in point sable. Supporters Dexter: a lion or; sinister, a tiger or. Motto Spes audaces adjuvat.

Peerage of England
Preceded by John Holles	Earl of Clare; 1637–1666	Succeeded by Gilbert Holles
