= Listed buildings in Haughton, Nottinghamshire =

Haughton is a civil parish in the Bassetlaw District of Nottinghamshire, England. The parish contains four listed buildings that are recorded in the National Heritage List for England. Of these, one is listed at Grade II*, the middle of the three grades, and the others are at Grade II, the lowest grade. The parish contains the hamlet of Haughton and the surrounding countryside, and the listed buildings consist of a ruined church, two farmhouses and a range of farm buildings.

== Key ==
Grade	Criteria
II*	Particularly important buildings of more than special interest
II	Buildings of national importance and special interest

== Buildings ==
Name and location	Photograph	Date	Notes	Grade
St James' Church; 53.24940°N 0.96576°W		Early 12th century	The church was originally a domestic chapel, and is now in ruins. It is in stone, and the remains are of the nave, the chancel and a north chantry chapel. They include a blocked three-arcade with the remains of octagonal columns, moulded capitals, and double-chamfered arches. The south doorway, dating from the early 12th century, has remnants of zigzag decoration.	II*
Haughton Farmhouse; 53.24435°N 0.97953°W	—	Mid 18th century	The farmhouse is in red brick, with a floor band and a pantile roof. There are two storeys and attics, a main range of four bays, and a buttress on the right corner. In the centre is a closed porch with a doorway and casement windows on the sides. The other windows on the front are sash windows, and all the openings are under segmental arches. Recessed to the right is a conservatory, recessed to the left is a single-storey porch, and at the rear is a wing with two storeys, two bays and dentilled eaves.	II
Farm Buildings, Haughton Farm; 53.24454°N 0.97921°W	—	Late 18th century	The farm buildings include stable blocks, a pigeoncote and a barn, and have been partly converted for other uses. They are in red brick with pantile roofs, and form a quadrangle plan, with extensions. The pigeoncote and the barn have two storeys, and the other buildings have one. Inside the stables are hay racks, and the pigeoncote contains brick nesting boxes.	II
Watermill Farmhouse; 53.24697°N 0.98468°W	—	Early 19th century	The farmhouse is in red brick on a plinth, with dentilled eaves and a pantile roof. There are two storeys and an attic, a main range of three bays, and a rear lean-to. Three steps lead up to the central doorway that has a cornice on wooden consoles, and the windows are casements with cambered arches.	II
