= Wigmore Street =

Street in London, England

Coordinates: 51°30′58″N 0°09′01″W

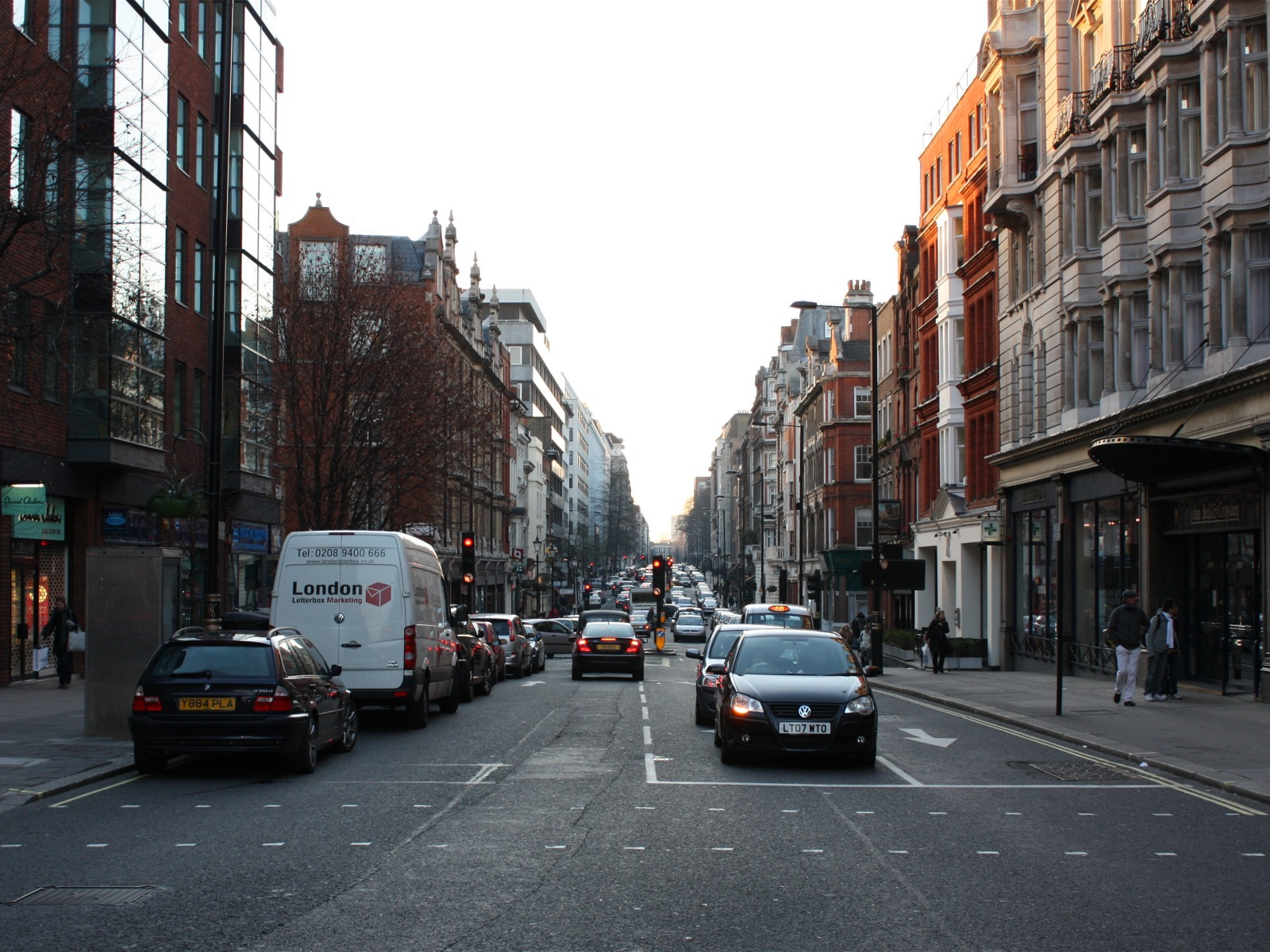
Wigmore Street, London

Wigmore Street is a street in the City of Westminster, in the West End of London. The street runs for about 600 yards parallel and to the north of Oxford Street between Portman Square to the west and Cavendish Square to the east. It is named after the village of Wigmore and its castle in Herefordshire, a seat of the family of Robert Harley, politician around the time of Queen Anne, who owned land in the area.

Numbers 18-22 Wigmore Street, the Brinsmead Galleries, were built in 1892, designed by Leonard V. Hunt for John Brinsmead & Sons piano manufacturers. There are nine showrooms. The well-known Wigmore Hall concert hall (at No 36 Wigmore Street) was also built by a piano manufacturers, the German company C. Bechstein Pianofortefabrik in 1899–1901, with a showroom next door. It is located on the north side, just to the east of the junction with Welbeck Street.

For about a hundred years beginning in the late 19th century, Wigmore Street had a great concentration of optometrists, dispensing opticians, makers of ophthalmic instruments, and related professions. Harley Street and Wimpole Street, famous for their private medical practices, are nearby and have junctions with Wigmore Street. The veteran pharmacy John Bell & Croyden has been located in premises on the street since 1912.

Number 95 Wigmore Street was the location of the original offices of the Beatles' Apple Corps in 1968 prior to their move to Savile Row.

The nearest tube stations are on Oxford Street, which runs south of and parallel to Wigmore Street: Marble Arch, located to the south-west; Bond Street to the south, and Oxford Circus to the south-east.

The corner of Wimpole and Wigmore Streets features in the famous legal case about causing a "nuisance" between neighbours – Sturges v. Bridgman (1879).
