= Haughton Hall, Nottinghamshire =

Haughton Hall
- Location within Nottinghamshire

General information
- Coordinates: 53.248706°N 0.974858°W
- Construction started: 1509
- Completed: 1545
- Destroyed: after 1770
- Client: William Holles

Haughton Hall was an English country house near Haughton, Nottinghamshire.

== History ==
Houghton Hall was built by William Holles and his son William Holles (MP). The park of 240 acres was enclosed in 1509 and the small house was greatly extended. Gervase Holles reported that the hall contained a shield inscribed W.H. A.D. 1545. The park was later extended to 900 acres.

After William Holles (MP) died in 1590, the estate passed through the hands the Earls of Clare, and then through to the Dukes of Newcastle-under-Lyme. When they built themselves a house at Clumber in 1770, Haughton Hall was demolished.

Around 1610, Prince Henry was entertained in the house for several days by John Holles who was Comptroller of the Household for the prince until his death in 1612.
