= Richard Fortescue (politician) =

Member of the Parliament of England

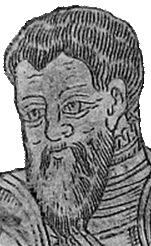
- Richard Fortescue (d. 1570), detail from monumental brass, Filleigh Church

Sheriff of Devon
- In office 1562-1563

Member of Parliament for Tavistock

Personal details
- Born: c. 1517
- Died: 30 June 1570 (aged 52–53) Filleigh, Devon, England
- Spouse: Joan Morton
- Children: 3+, including Hugh

Richard Fortescue (c. 1517–1570) of Filleigh, North Devon was an English Member of Parliament and prominent land-owner and member of the Devonshire gentry, ancestor to the Earls Fortescue.

== Origins ==
The Fortescues are an ancient family, whose roots can be traced back to Norman times. He was the eldest son of Bartholomew Fortescue, Esq. (d. 1557), lord of the manor of Filleigh and of several other manors, by his wife Ellen More (or Moore), daughter of Maurice More of Moor Hayes in Cullompton, Devon. He was a great-grandson of Sir John Fortescue (c. 1394 - c. 1480), chief justice.

== Career ==
Richard Fortescue was elected MP for Tavistock in 1545. He was a Justice of the Peace for Devon by 1558/9, and Sheriff of Devon in 1562-3.

== Marriage and progeny ==
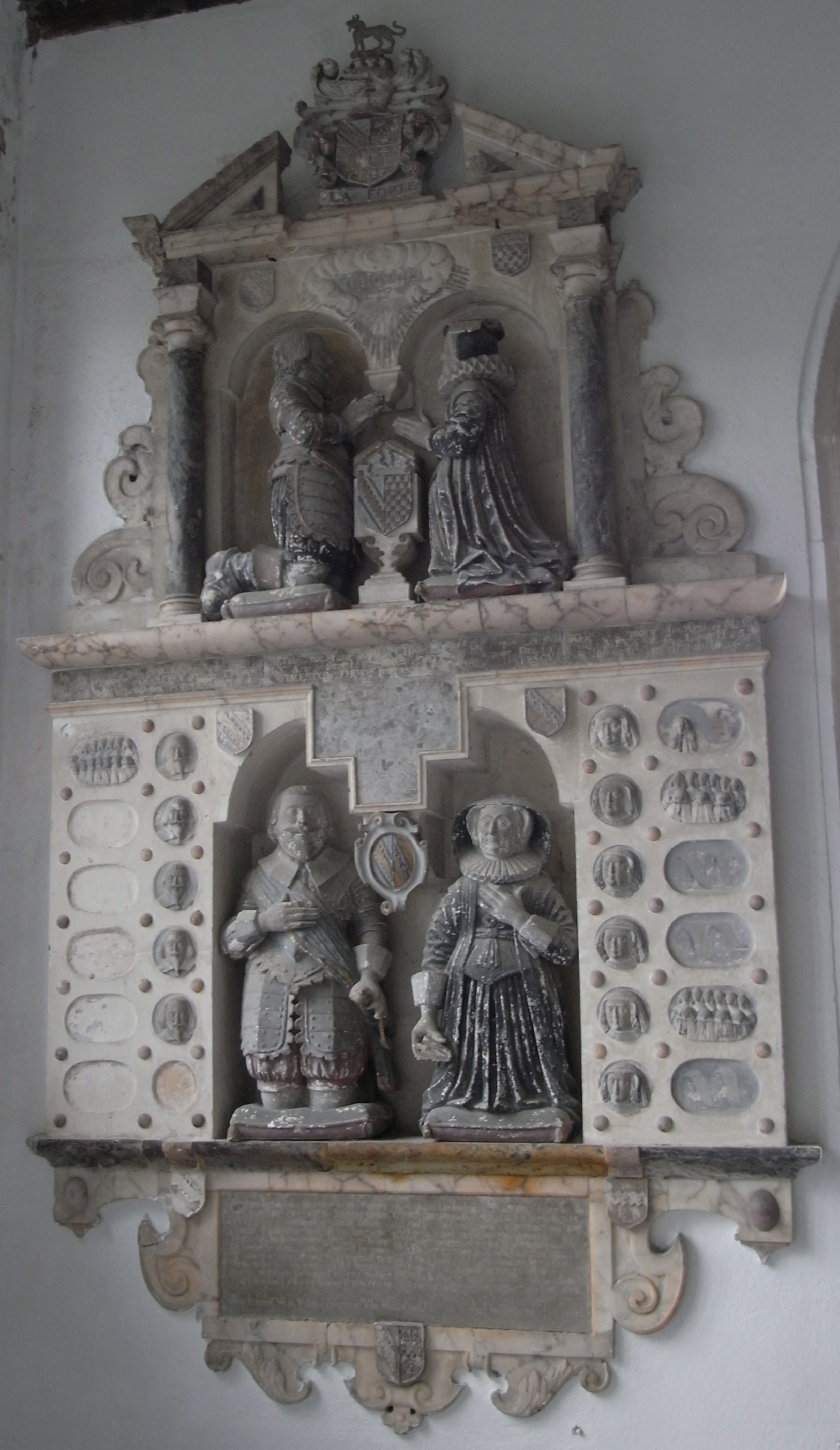
Mural monument erected in 1638 in Weare Giffard Church, the top tier showing Hugh Fortescue (1544–1600), son of Richard Fortescue, and his wife Mary Chichester.

He married about 1544 Joan Morton, daughter of Robert Morton, by Dorothy, daughter of Sir John Fitz James, of Redlynch (in Bruton), Somerset, Chief Baron of the Exchequer, Chief Justice of the King’s Bench, 1526–39. They had at least one son, and two daughters, including:

- Hugh I Fortescue (1544–1600), Sheriff of Devon in 1583, who married Elizabeth Chichester (d. 1630), a daughter of Sir John Chichester (d. 1569) of Raleigh. He was buried in Weare Giffard Church, where exists his monument erected by his grandson Hugh Fortescue (1592–1661), who married in 1612 at Petrockstowe Mary Rolle (d. 1648/9) of Heanton Satchville, Petrockstowe. Their grandson was Hugh Fortescue (1665–1719), MP, who married Bridget Boscawen (d. 1708), daughter of Hugh Boscawen (d. 1701) by his wife Lady Margaret Clinton (d. 1688) the senior co-heiress to the Clinton barony.
- Mary Fortescue (d. 1623), wife of Hugh III Culme (d. 1618) of Molland-Champson.

== Death and burial ==
He died on 30 June 1570 at Filleigh, and was buried in Filleigh Church, where two monumental brasses exist in his memory.

== Monumental brasses ==
Two monumental brasses which formerly adorned a tomb-monument of Richard Fortescue exist in Filleigh Church, having been removed from their original setting in the old parish church of Filleigh, demolished c. 1730 to make way for landscaping surrounding the Palladian mansion of Castle Hill, which was a re-modelling of Richard Fortescue's ancient manor house. Both are now affixed within Victorian wooden frames on the north wall of the nave of the new parish church of St Paul, built in 1732 some half mile away from its former location next to the manor house. There are two heraldic escutcheons on each brass, in poor condition with parts torn away.

=== Brass of Richard Fortescue ===
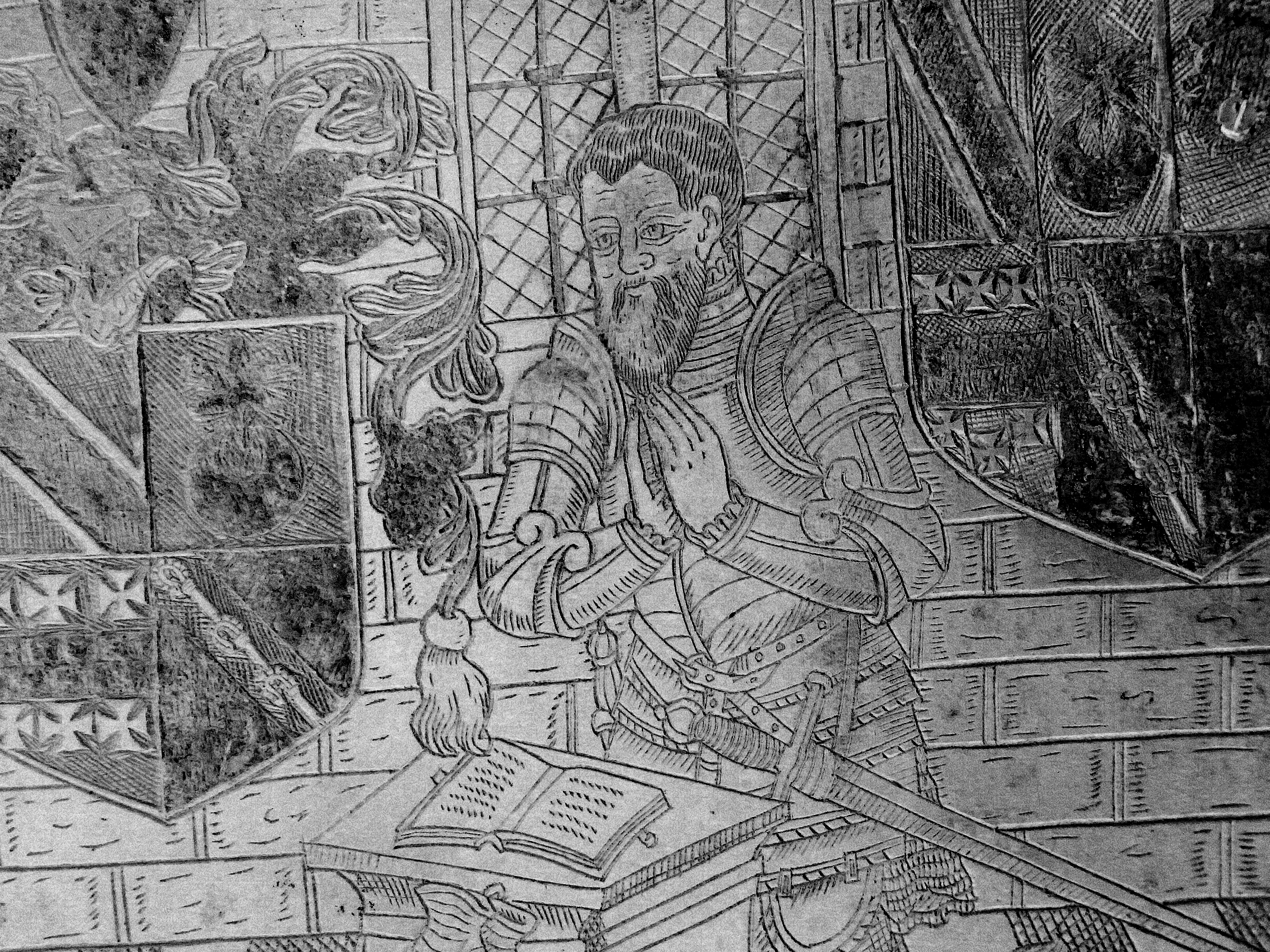
Monumental brass depicting Richard Fortescue, Filleigh Church

The right-hand (easternmost) brass on the nave wall depicts Richard Fortescue as a heavily bearded figure dressed in armour kneeling towards the left at a prie-dieu, with his helmet and gauntlets on the floor. It is inscribed below in Gothic script:

Here lyeth Richard Ffortescue of Ffylleygh, Esquier, who dyed on the last daye of June in the yere of oure lorde god 1570.

On either side are two escutcheons. That on the dexter shows the arms of Fortescue in the first quarter with three other quarterings. The escutcheon is surmounted by a crest, apparently a plain shield, in Latin scutum, alluding to the Latinized family name de Forti Scuto meaning "(from) a strong shield". In the 2nd quarter are the arms of Denzil (or Denshill): Sable a crescent with a mullet issuing from between its horns argent [see Sir George Carew's Scroll of Arms 1588 (1901): 93]. The arms in the 3rd quarter are the arms of Filleigh: Gules, a fess vairee between 6 crosses formee or. In the 4th quarter are the arms of Walter Treawyn of Weare Gifford, (d. 1381) by marriage to whose daughter and heiress, according to Tristram Risdon, the Fortescues had acquired Weare Giffard: Argent, on a bend vert between six crosses crosslet fitchee gules three crozier heads or.

The shield to the sinister shows Fortescue, with quarterings as at dexter, impaling Morton: Quarterly, 1st and 4th: Gules, a goat's head erased or; 2nd and 3rd: Ermine, (Moreton). These are the arms of his wife's family. They are the same arms borne by Joan Morton's kinsman, John Morton (c. 1420 – 15 September 1500), Archbishop of Canterbury 1486 to 1500. The heraldic overmantel now at Simonsbath House originally from Weare Giffard Hall, both former Fortescue residences, appears to confirm the blazon. A framed handwritten note, c. 1900, made by a member of the Fortescue family hangs by the side of the Simonsbath House overmantel and states the arms to be of Morton.

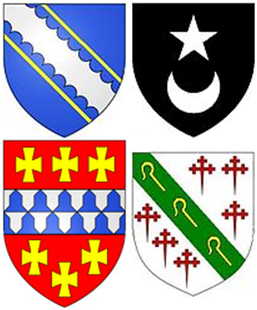
The shield in front of Richard Fortescue shows the following quartered arms: 1: Fortescue; 2: Denzil; 3: de Filleigh; 4: de Weare (or Trewin)

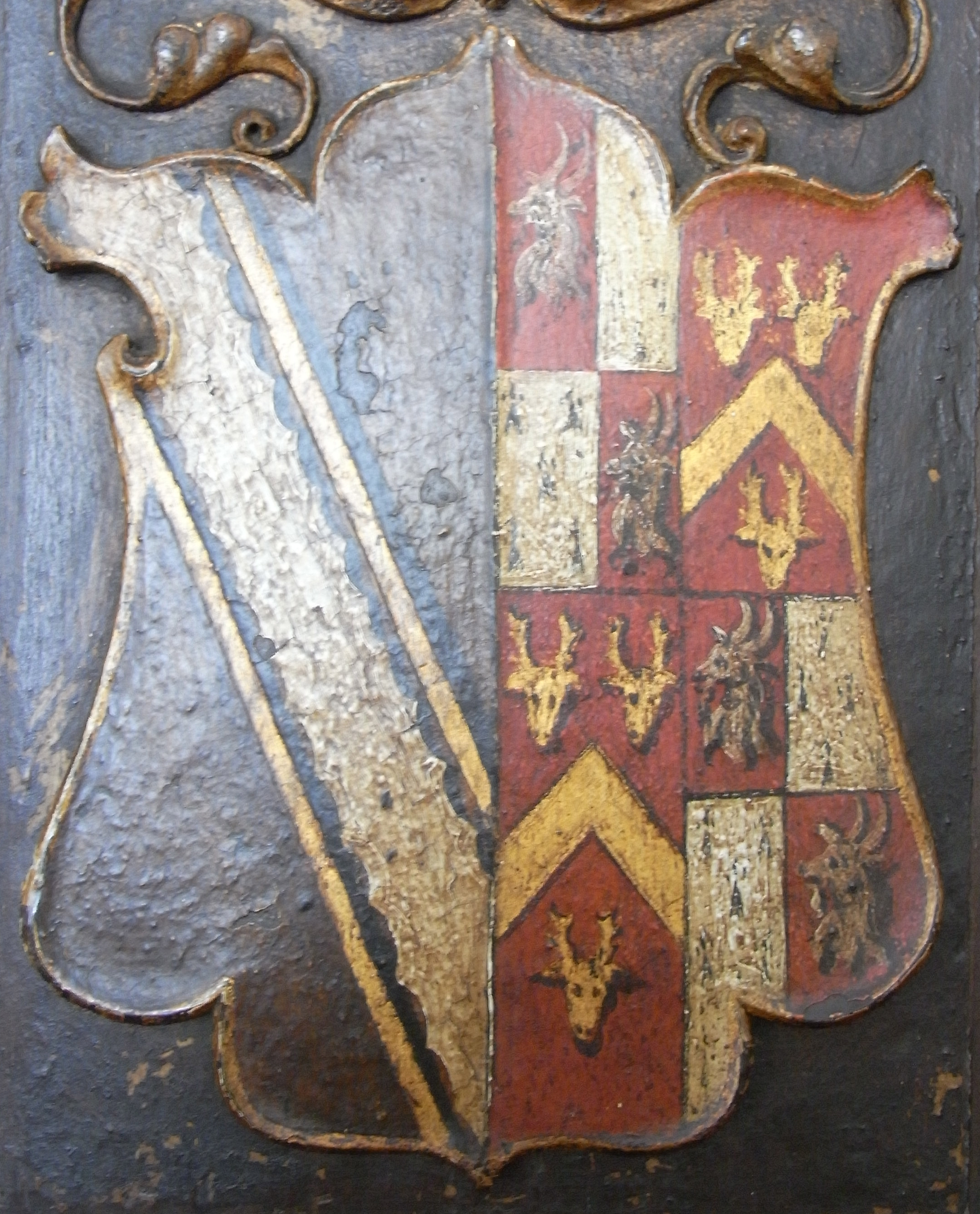
Arms of Richard Fortescue (d. 1570) from Weare Giffard overmantel now at Simonsbath House. The arms of his wife are shown impaled in the sinister half as follows: 1st & 4th grand quarters: quarterly 1st & 4th: Gules, a goat's head erased argent armed or; 2nd & 3rd: Ermine (Moreton); 2nd & 3rd grand quarters: Gules, a chevron between three stag's heads cabossed or (Hagget of Kent)

== Sources ==
- Virgoe, Roger, Biography of Richard Fortescue, published in History of Parliament: House of Commons 1509-1558
- Nichols, John Gough, The Herald & Genealogist, Vol. 8, London, 1874, Notes on the Arms of Sir Francis Drake, pp. 307-313
- Friend, Hilderic, Bygone Devonshire, London, 1898, pp. 80-81
- Lysons, Samuel, Magna Britannia, Vol. 6, 1822, Antiquities: Ancient Church Architecture
