= Weare Giffard =

Village, civil parish and former manor in Devon, England

Coordinates: 50°58′N 4°11′W

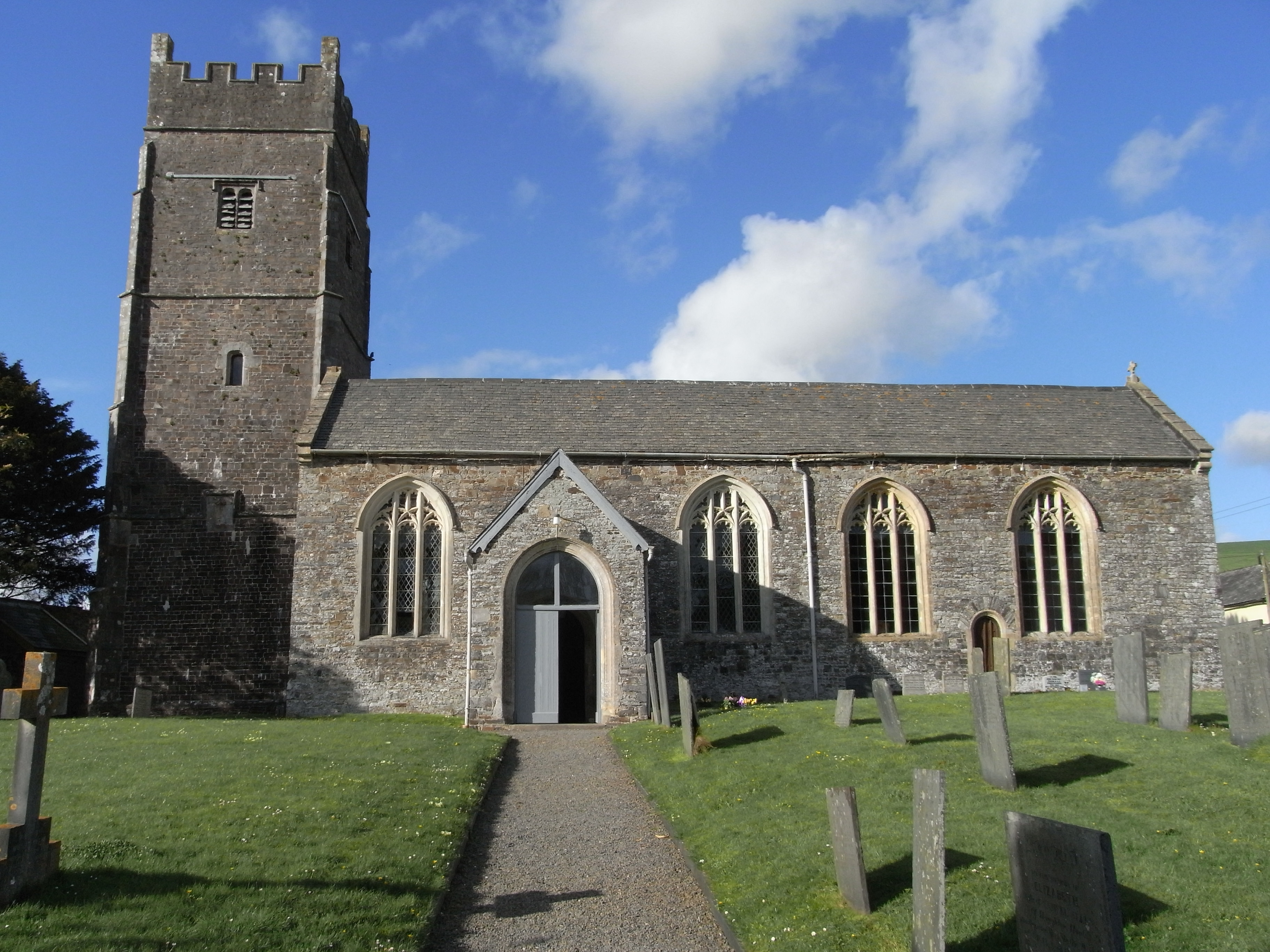
- Church of the Holy Trinity, Weare Giffard, viewed from the south

- Location within Devon
- Population: 345 (2011 census)
- Civil parish: Weare Giffard
- District: Torridge
- Shire county: Devon
- Region: South West
- Country: England
- Sovereign state: United Kingdom

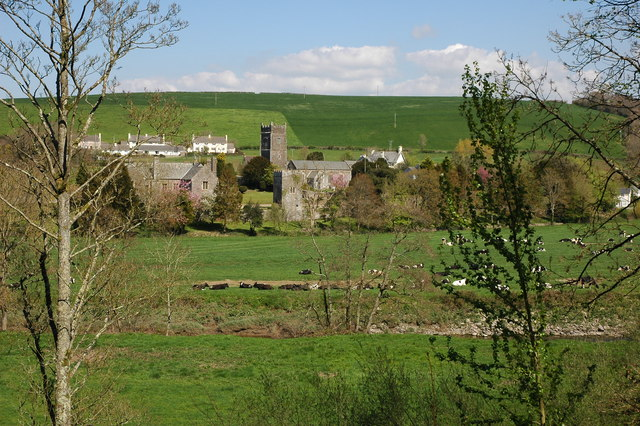
Weare Giffard Church and Weare Giffard Hall, viewed from the southwest across the River Torridge on the Tarka Trail. The main modern settlement is situated to the right, some 1/2-mile upstream along the Torridge valley

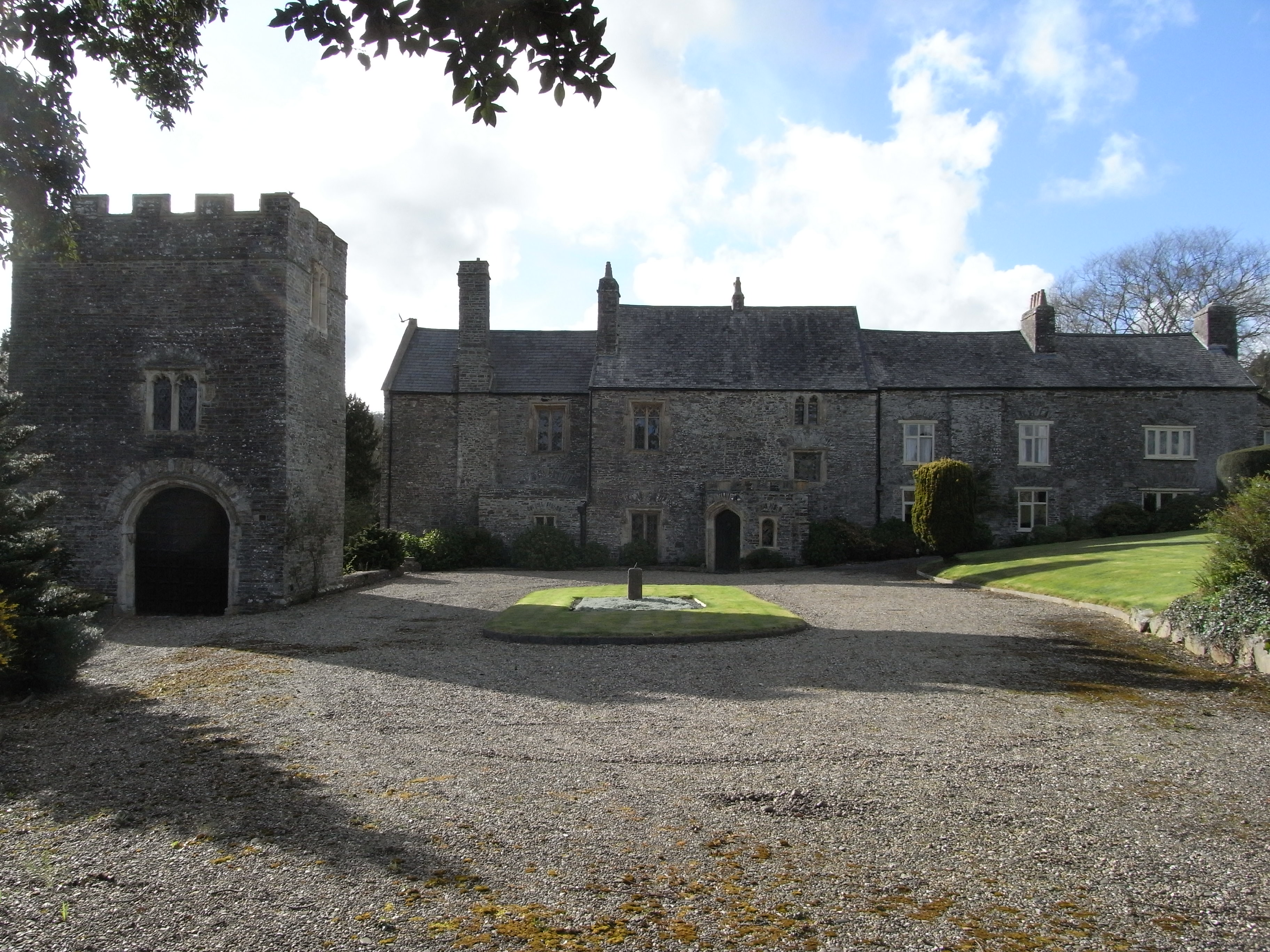
Weare Giffard Hall, manor house of Weare Giffard, North Devon. Viewed from the east at formal entrance gates

Weare Giffard is a small village, civil parish and former manor in the Torridge district, in north Devon, England. The church and manor house are situated 2 1/2 miles NW of Great Torrington in Devon. Most of the houses within the parish are situated some 1/2-mile east of the church. The church is situated on a hillside to the north and slightly above the wide and flat valley floor of the River Torridge. The Church of the Holy Trinity and the adjacent Weare Giffard Hall are designated members of the Grade I listed buildings in Devon. In 2011 the parish had a population of 345.

== History ==
The historian of Devon Tristram Risdon (d. 1640) supposed the name Weare to be derived from a fish weir which was historically situated in the river to catch fish. The construction of a fish-weir generally required a licence from the feudal overlord, as naturally these affected the catches of other inhabitants further along the river. Many disputes are recorded in the medieval records over disputes concerning fish-weirs.

== Descent of the manor ==
=== Giffard ===
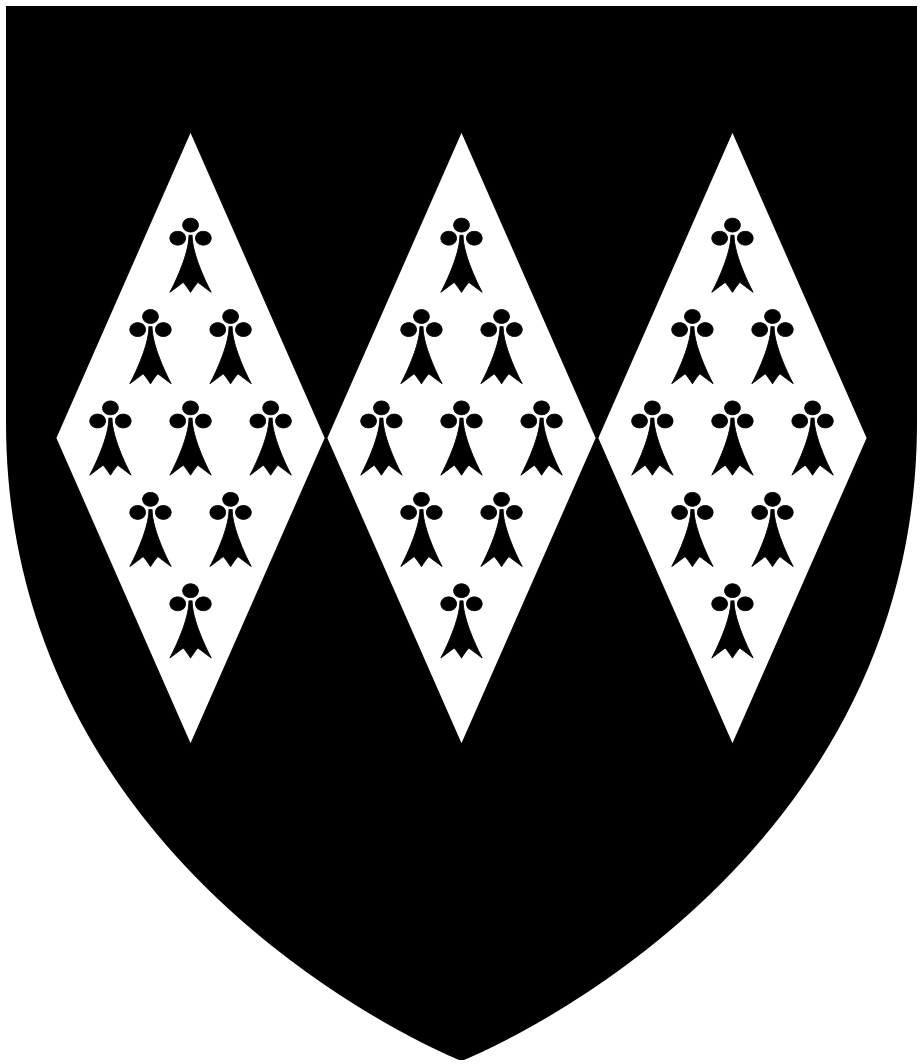
Arms of Giffard: Sable, three fusils conjoined in fesse ermine. These arms can be seen in Chittlehampton Church, Devon, on the monument of John Giffard (d. 1622) of Brightley. They came to prominence again in the 19th century as the arms of Hardinge Giffard (1823–1921), Lord High Chancellor of Great Britain, who was elevated to the peerage in 1885 as Baron Halsbury of Halsbury in the County of Devon, and was created Earl of Halsbury in 1898

One of the earliest holders of the manor was the 13th-century Sir Walter Giffard, after whom the manor subsequently took its suffix, who lived during the reign of King Henry III (1216–1272). He left a daughter Emma as his sole heiress who married three times:

- Firstly to Hugh Widworthy, without issue.
- Secondly to Sir William Trewin, for whom she produced issue, William Trewin, who took the surname "de Wear" in lieu of his patronymic.
- Thirdly to Sir Robert Dynham, without issue.

Stone effigies of an early member of the Giffard family and his wife exist in the Parish Church, now housed separately in arched niches set into the north wall of the nave. They are believed to represent Sir Walter Giffard and his wife Lady Alice de St George, whose son was also named Walter, however no identifying inscriptions or armorials survive to confirm any attribution of identity. The original location of these effigies was in the north transept, from which they were removed in the 19th century to make room for the new organ.

==== Surviving branches of Giffard ====
The estate of Brightley in the parish of Chittlehampton, about 10 miles east of Weare Giffard, was acquired by Sir Roger Giffard (d. 1547) on his marriage to Margaret Coblegh, the heiress of Brightley. Over the porch of Brightley Barton, now a large farmhouse, still exists an escutcheon bearing the arms of Giffard. Roger was a son of Sir Thomas Giffard (c. 1461–1513) of the manor of Halsbury, about 13 miles west of Weare Giffard. The Giffards of Halsbury appear to have been a cadet line of the Giffards of Weare. Bartholomew Giffard (died c. 1314) of Clovelly, married Joan de Halsbury, the heiress of Halsbury. The 13th-century Testa de Nevill lists the manor of Clovelly as being held by Sir Roger Giffard from his overlord Sir Walter Giffard of Wear. The senior male line at Clovelly died out in 1303 on the death of Sir Matthew Giffard, who left two daughters co-heiresses.

=== de Wear ===
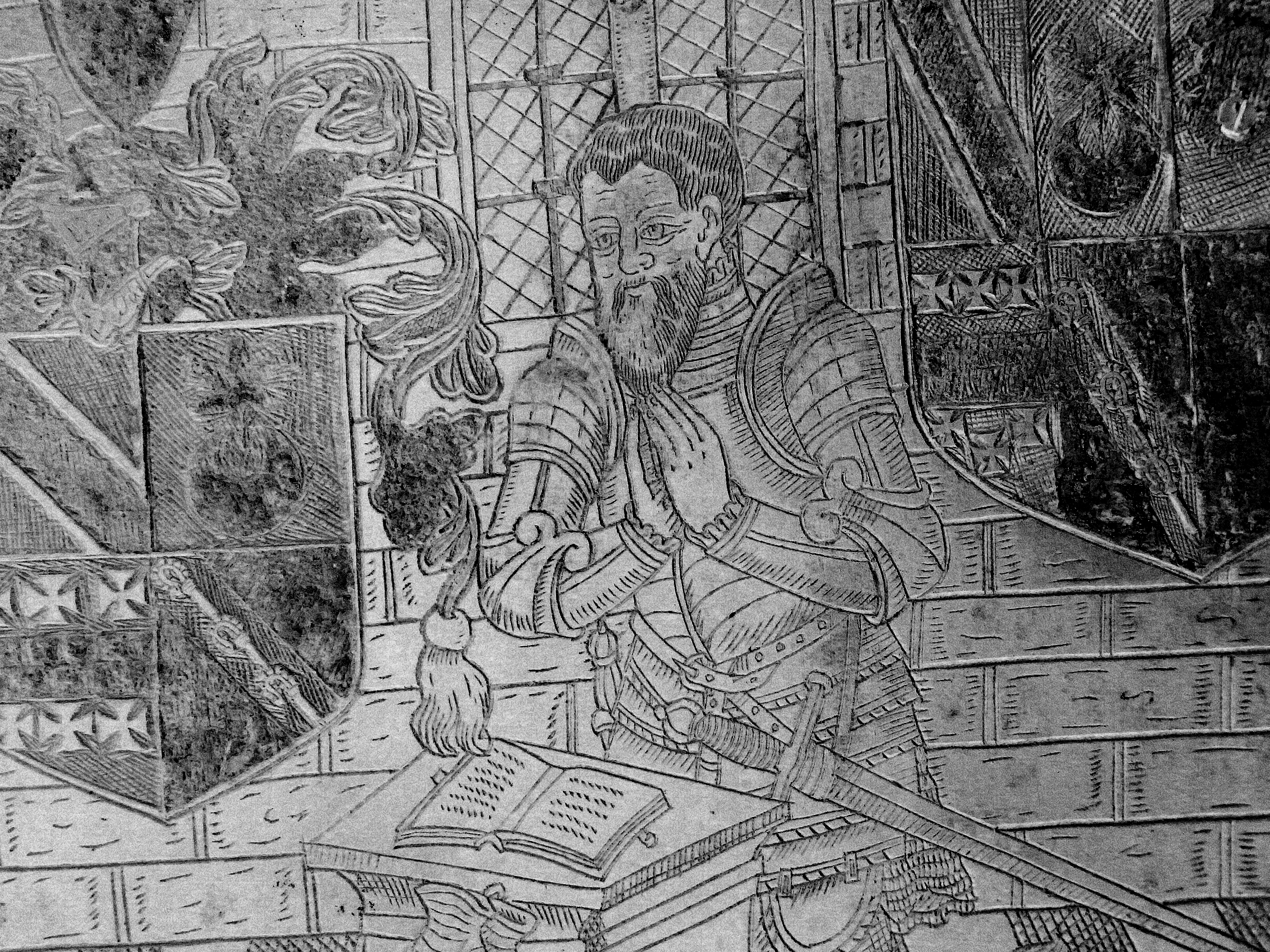
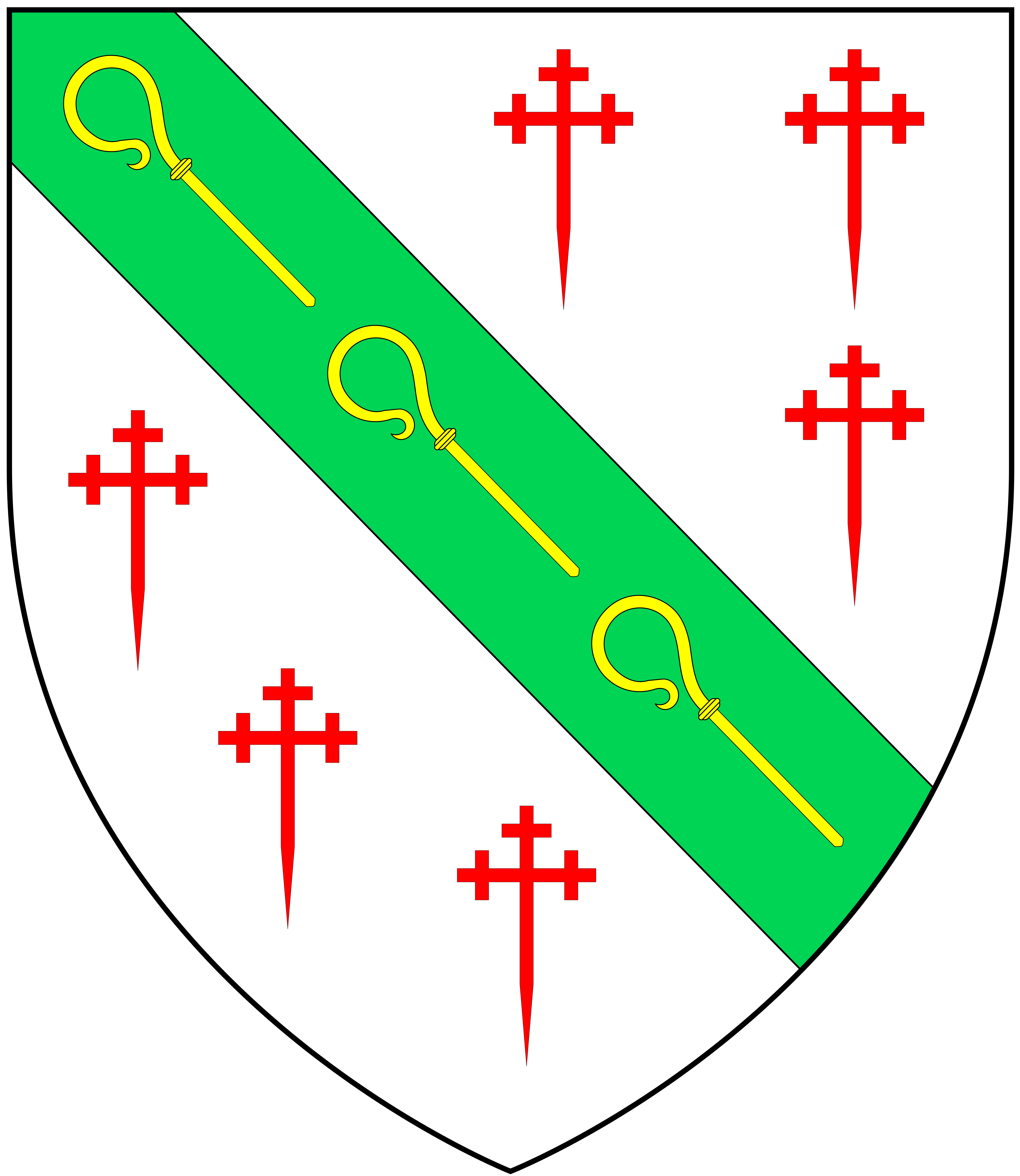
Monumental brass depicting Richard Fortescue (d. 1570), Filleigh Church. The arms of Trewin of Weare Giffard are shown in the 4th quarter of the escutcheon on the dexter side: Argent, on a bend vert between six crosses crosslet fitchee gules three crozier heads or

The Trewin (or Treawyn, etc.) family, alias "de Weare", are said to have used fishes as an heraldic device, in reference to the fish-weir within the manor and such devices are sculpted on the spandrels of the western arch of the western porch to the Hall. The arms of William Trewin alias Weare (d. 1421) are shown in the 4th quarter of the escutcheon on the monumental brass depicting Richard Fortescue (d. 1570) in Filleigh Church: Argent, on a bend vert between six crosses crosslet fitchee gules three crozier heads or.

The last of in the male line of the de Wear family was William de Wear, who died c. 1421 and left a daughter his sole heiress, who became the wife of Richard Denzell, descended from a cadet branch of the Denzell family of Denzell manor in St Mawgan parish, near St Columb Major, near Newquay, Cornwall.

=== Denzell ===
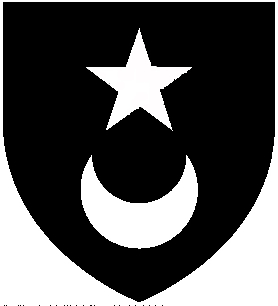
Arms of Denzell: Sable, a mullet in chief and a crescent in base argent

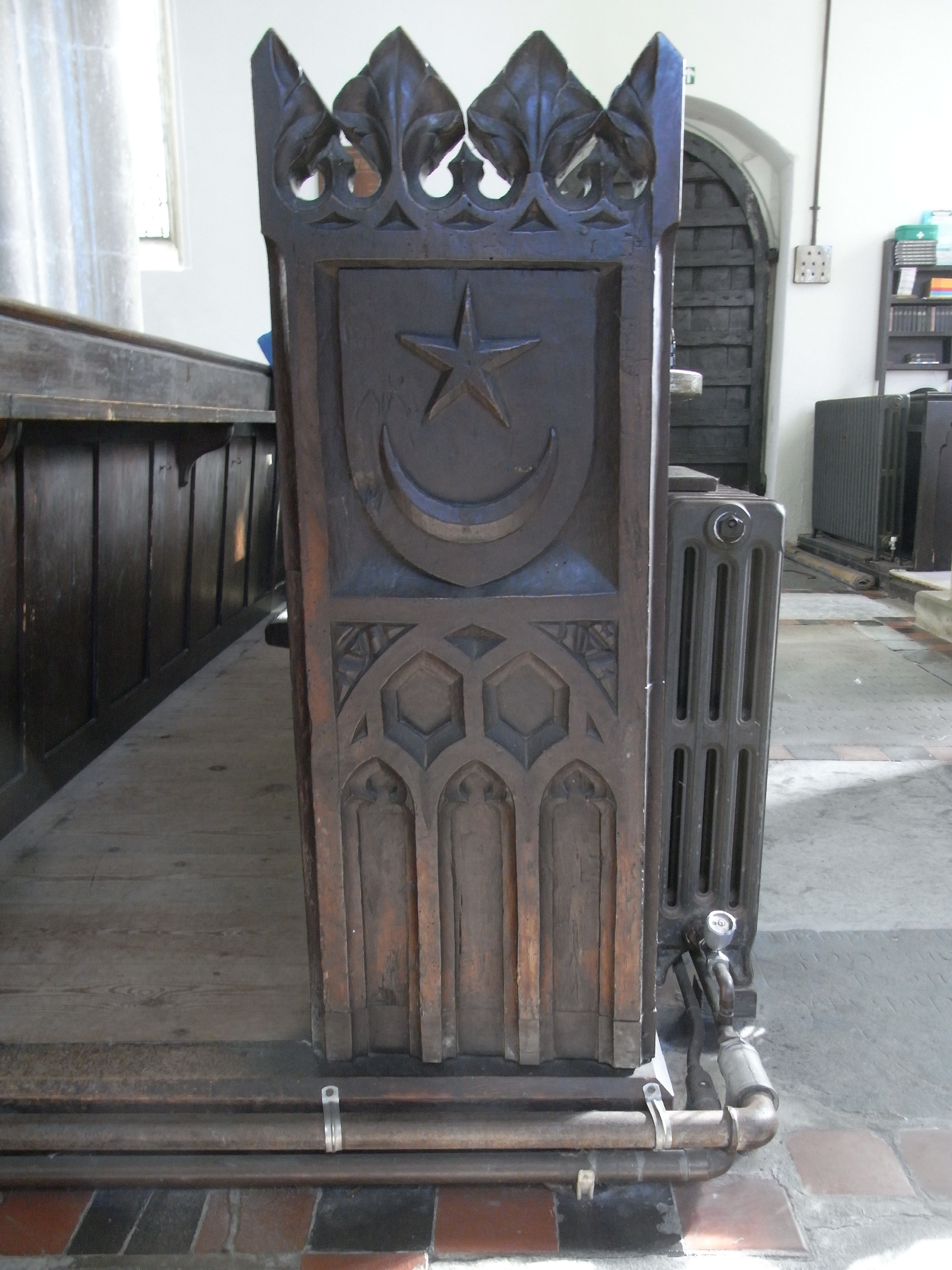
Heraldic bench-end c. 1510, Weare Giffard Church, looking towards entrance door in south wall of nave, showing arms of Denzell family: Sable, a crescent in base and a mullet in chief argent

The senior line of the Denzell family became extinct in the male line on the death of John Denzel (d. 1535), serjeant-at-law and Attorney-General to the Queen Consort, Elizabeth of York. He held large estates in Cornwall and left two daughters as his co-heiresses, Ann who married Sir William Holles (1509–91), later Lord Mayor of London, and another daughter who married into the Roskymer family. It was a cadet branch of this family which had acquired Weare Giffard by marriage to the heiress of Weare.

Richard Denzell had one son, also named Richard, by his wife the de Wear heiress, and he left no male progeny but a daughter Elizabeth as his sole heiress. The arms of Denzell were: Sable, a mullet in chief and a crescent in base argent. These arms survive sculpted on a bench-end, c. 1510, in Weare Giffard Church and also sculpted in stone on the monument to Sir Richard de Pomeroy (1442–1496), in St Mary's Church, Berry Pomeroy. Sir Richard de Pomeroy (1442–1496), KB, knighted by King Henry VII, Sheriff of Devon in 1473, married Elizabeth Densell (d. 1508), daughter and co-heiress of Richard Densell of Weare Giffard and Filleigh, Devon, and widow of Martin Fortescue (d .1472), of Wimpstone, Modbury. The Denzell arms are also shown in the second quarter of the arms of Richard Fortescue (c. 1517–1570) on his monumental brasses in Filleigh Church.

=== Fortescue ===
Arms of Fortescue: Azure, a bend engrailed argent plain cotised or. Canting motto: Forte Scutum Salus Ducum ("A Strong Shield is the Salvation of Leaders")

In 1454 Sir Martin Fortescue (d. 1472), second son of Sir John Fortescue (1395–1485), Chief Justice, of Ebrington Manor in Gloucestershire, married Elizabeth Densyll, the daughter and heiress of Richard Densyll of Weare Giffard and Filleigh, and thereby the manor became a possession of the Fortescue family, together with substantial other Densyll manors including East Buckland, Bray (both adjacent to Filleigh), Buckland Filleigh, Combe and Tamerton. The Filleigh Estate, comprising some 5,500 acres (22 km^{2}), together with Castle Hill mansion is still today privately owned by descendants of the Fortescue family. The last Earl Fortescue to own Castle Hill was Hugh Fortescue, 5th Earl Fortescue (1888–1958) who died in June 1958, aged 70. As he had no surviving male issue he was succeeded in the earldom by his younger brother, Denzil Fortescue, 6th Earl Fortescue. However the 5th Earl bequeathed Castle Hill, his principal seat, to his elder surviving daughter, Lady Margaret Fortescue (b. 1923) and bequeathed Weare Giffard to his younger daughter Lady Elizabeth Fortescue (b. 1926), who sold the manor in 1960. Lady Margaret had married in 1948 Bernard van Cutsem, and had issue. Castle Hill is now the home of her daughter Eleanor, Countess of Arran (b. 1949), who married on 28 September 1974 Arthur Gore, 9th Earl of Arran (b. 1938). Lady Elizabeth married in 1946 Major William Lloyd (John) Baxendale, Coldstream Guards, of Hailwell House, Framfield, Uckfield, Sussex, and had issue:

- David Hugh (b. 1952)
- Peter Anthony (b. 1955)
- Lucinda Margaret (b. 1958)

Lady Elizabeth Baxendale sold the manor of Weare Giffard in 1960.

== Weare Giffard Hall ==
Weare Giffard Hall was described thus by Sabine Baring-Gould:

"In approaching the house, we have on our left the square gateway tower, and enter, by a low modern Gothic porch, the entrance hall. Above the fireplace are two oak carvings of the Adoration of the Magi and the Resurrection. The walls of the hall are lined with tapestry. The best view of the hall roof is obtained from the gallery. The north wall is ornamented with three full-length portraits in the style of Sir Peter Lely, and some Elizabethan medallions. On the south wall are three coats-of-arms in relief: the Royal arms, dating 1599; on the right, the Bedford; on the left, those of Bourchier, Earl of Bath. To the height of 10 ft. the walls are panelled with richly carved oak. There are several rooms with interesting fireplaces".

== Fortescue mural monument ==
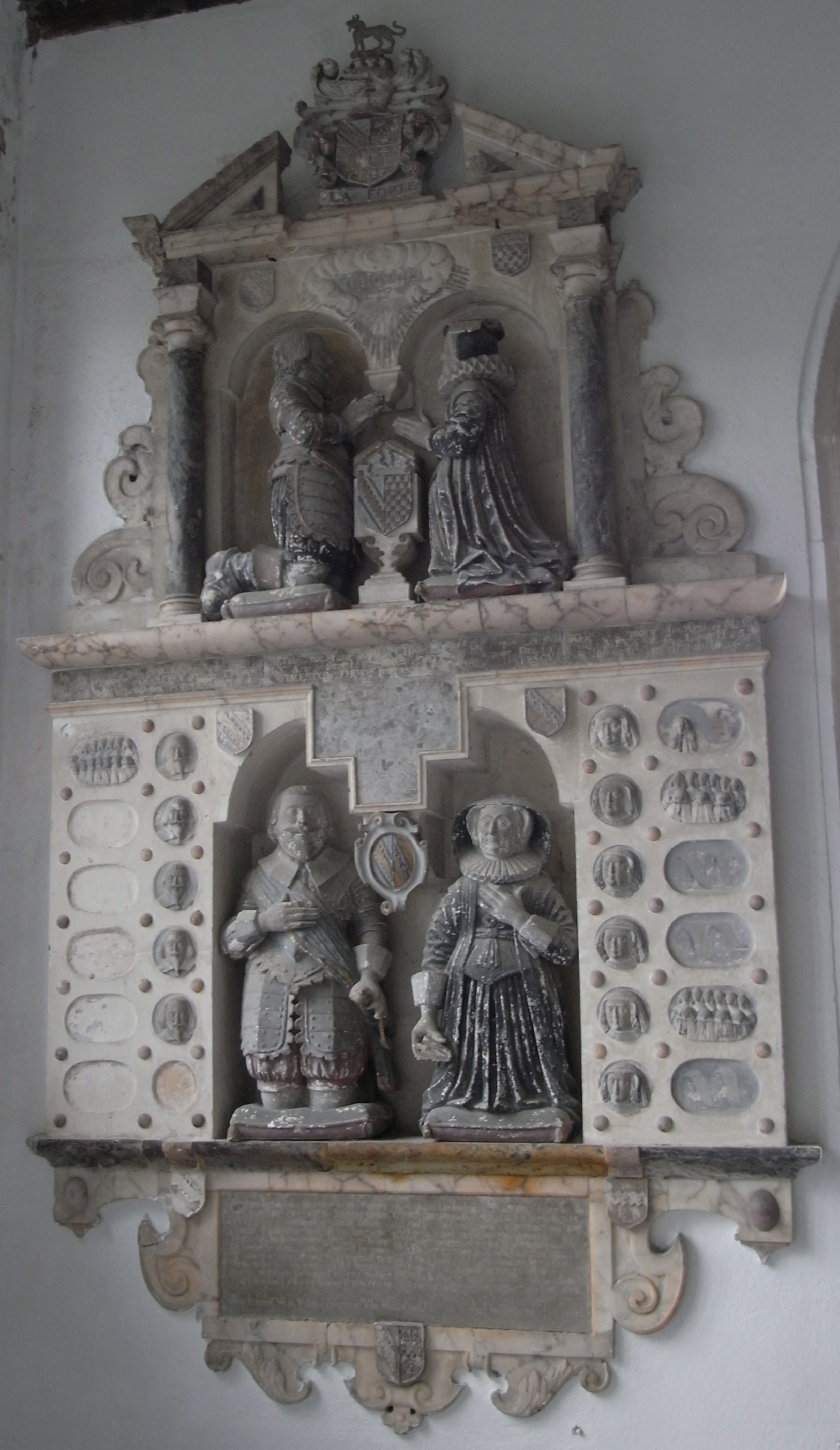
1638 Mural monument in Weare Giffard Church to 3 generations of the Fortescue family. South wall of south aisle chapel ("Fortescue Chapel")

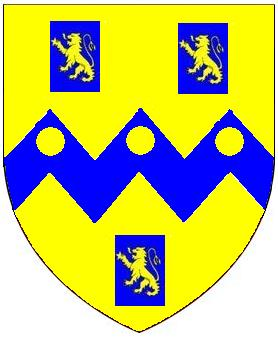
Arms of Rolle, as shown on the lowest tablet: Or, on a fesse dancetté between three billets azure each charged with a lion rampant of the first three bezants

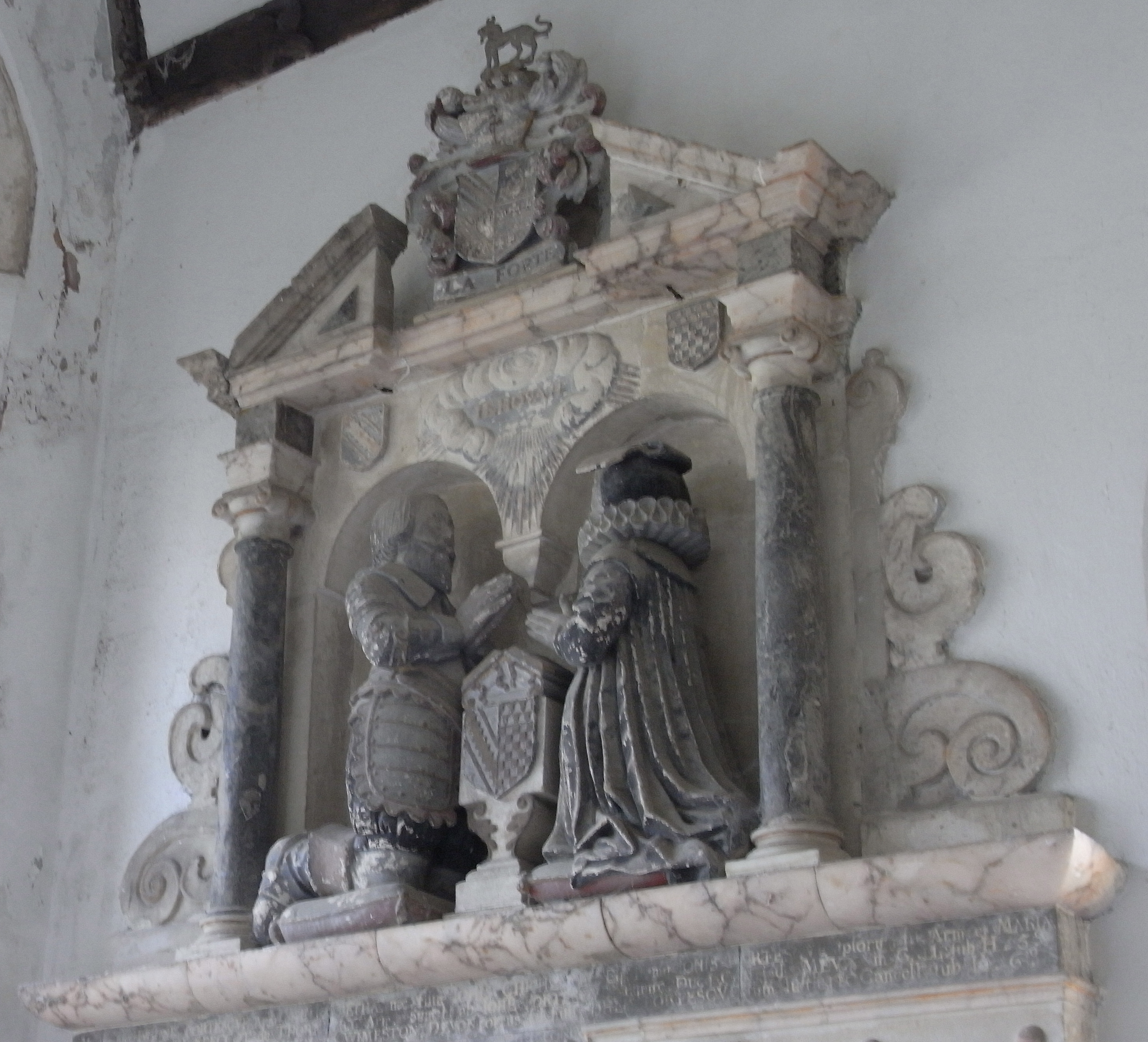
Top tier figures of Hugh Fortescue and his wife Elizabeth Chichester, daughter of Sir John Chichester (d. 1569) of Raleigh. On the side of the prie dieu is an escutcheon showing the arms of Fortescue impaling Chichester: Checky or and gules, a chief vair

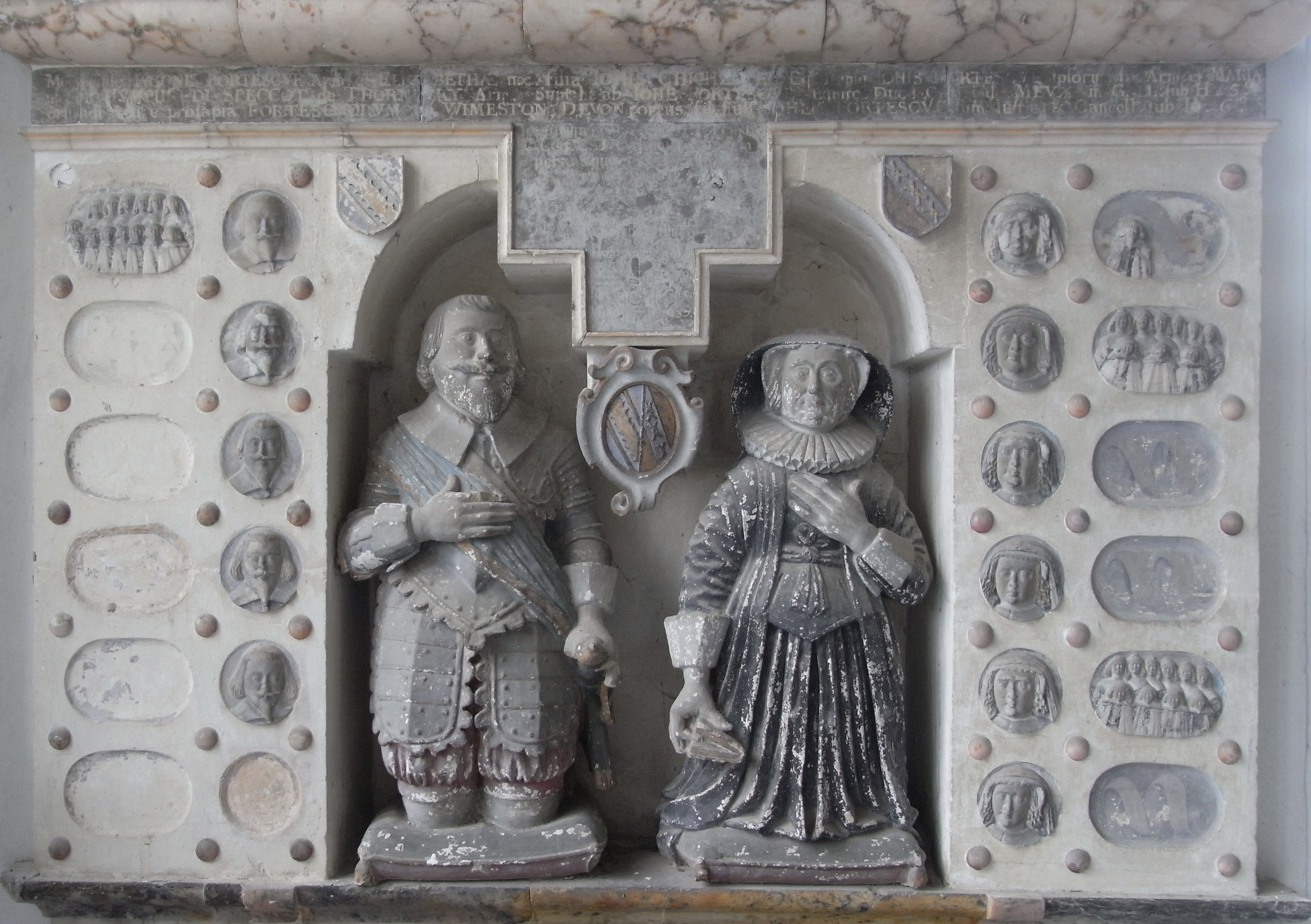
Lower tier figures of John Fortescue and his wife Mary Speccot of Thornbury, Devon, about 10 miles SW of Weare Giffard. Between the couple on a cartouche are the arms of Fortescue impaling Speccot: Or, on a bend gules three millrinds argent

High up on the south wall of the south aisle chapel ("Fortescue Chapel") of the parish church is affixed the Fortescue mural monument, erected in 1638 by Hugh Fortescue (1592–1661). Hugh was married to his third cousin Mary Rolle (1587–1649), daughter of Robert Rolle (1560–1633) of Heanton Satchville, in Petrockstowe parish, by his wife Joan Hele (d. 1634). Robert Rolle was the eldest son of Henry Rolle by his wife Margaret Yeo (d. 1591), heiress of Heanton Satchville, Petrockstowe, whose monumental brasses can be seen in Petrockstowe Church. Margaret Yeo was the daughter and sole heiress of Robert Yeo by his wife Mary Fortescue, daughter of Bartholomew Fortescue (d. 1557)of Filleigh, the grandfather of Hugh Fortescue (d. 1600), the figure shown on the top tier of the Weare Giffard monument, son of Richard Fortescue (d. 1570), MP, of Filleigh, whose two monumental brasses can be seen in Filleigh Church. The monument is a two tiered baroque structure, showing on the top tier under a broken classical pediment (supporting an heraldic achievement under which is inscribed in large capitals: LE FORT JEHOVAH) Hugh's grandparents, Hugh Fortescue (1544–1600) and his wife Elizabeth Chichester (d. 1630), daughter of Sir John Chichester (d. 1569) of Raleigh, kneeling opposite each other in prayer with a prie dieu between them. Underneath on the second tier within a niche is shown his son John Fortescue (d. 1605) and his wife Mary Speccot, kneeling side by side facing the viewer, each with a hand on his and her own breast as if making a sacred oath. On either side of them are shown within medallions the faces in relief of their many children. Inscribed across the monument at the top of the lower (second) tier is the following Latin text:

Memoriale Hugonis Fortescue arm(igeris) et Elizabethae ux(oris) filiae Joh(anni)s Chichester Equit(is) itemque Joh(ann)is Fortescue eorum fil(ii) arm(igeris) et Mariae ux(oris) filiae Humphredi Speccot de Thornbury arm(igeris) Sunt hi ab Joh(ann)e Fortescue Equite Duce castri de Meaux in Gall(ia) sub H(enrico) 5.o (Quinto) oriundi qui praesepia Fortescutorum de Wimeston Devon ortus habuit fil(ium) Joh(ann)em Summum Justic(ium) et Cancell(arium) sub H(enrico) 6.o (Sexto) sepultum Ebertoniae Glocest(ria) Familia quidem perantiqua et etiamnum felici subole propagata sepulti sunt: Hugo, Aug. 2 1600; Joh(ann)es April 5, 1605: Elizabetha May 7, 1630; Maria April 11, 1637.

Which may be translated literally as:

In memory of Hugh Fortescue, Esquire, and of Elizabeth his wife, daughter of John Chichester Esquire and also of John Fortescue, the son of them, Esquire, and of Mary his wife, daughter of Humphrey Speccot of Thornbury, Esquire. These arose from John Fortescue, Knight, Captain of the Castle of Meaux in France, arisen under Henry the Fifth a scion of the Fortescues of Wympstone, Devon. He had a son John, Chief Justice and Chancellor under Henry the Sixth. He was buried at Ebrington in Gloucestershire. Indeed the very ancient family even now is happy with fruitful issue and are buried here: Hugo, Aug. 2 1600; John April 5, 1605: Elizabeth May 7, 1630; Mary April 11, 1637

Affixed to the lower edge of the monument is a stone tablet inscribed with the following verse:

"Stay Reader stay this structure seemes t'invite,
Thy wandring eyes on it to fixe thy sighte,
In this pile's summitte thou mayst discrie,
Heav'ns all beholding and all ...viding eye,
That sheads his benediction...beames,
Of love and goodness on these fruitfull streames,
Of humerous issue sprong from nuptiall tyes,
With various ancient worthy families,
Here is in breife presented to thy view,
The long-liv'd race of honour'd FORTESCUE:

Combin'd in holye rites on TIME'S faire scrole,
W.th CHICHESTER then SPECCOT last with ROLLE,
And long and wide may SACRED GRACE and FAME,
Produce and propagate this generous name,
That it may brooke what HONOUR gave in feild,
LE FORT-ESCU the strong and LASTING SHIELD,
A shield not only theyr owne right to fence,
But also to repell wrongs violence,
Which that it may accordingly be done,
Pray (Reader) pray GOD BE THEIR SHEILD AND SUNNE

The last line which follows in Latin comprises a chronogram dating device, similar to that on the Dennis monument erected in 1643 in Buckland Brewer Church to the Dennis family of Orleigh Court:

hVgo fortesCVe sCVtIger sVperstes VIr MarIae roLLe IsthoC fIerI feCIt honorIs CaVsa

Restated without the exaggerated capitals: Hugo Fortescue scutiger superstes vir Mariae Rolle isthoc fieri fecit honoris causa, which may be translated as: "Hugh Fortescue, Esquire, surviving, the husband of Mary Rolle made this to come into existence in cause of honour".

The Roman numerals inscribed in extra-large capitals must be added together individually, to give the date of 1638 for the erection of the monument, as follows: (V+C+V+C+V+I+V+V+I+M+I+L+L+I+C+I+I+C+I+I+C+V=1,638)

Below the tablet and to the right side are shown escutcheons with the arms of Rolle of Heanton Satchville, Petrockstowe.

== Chest tomb of Eleanor Fortescue ==
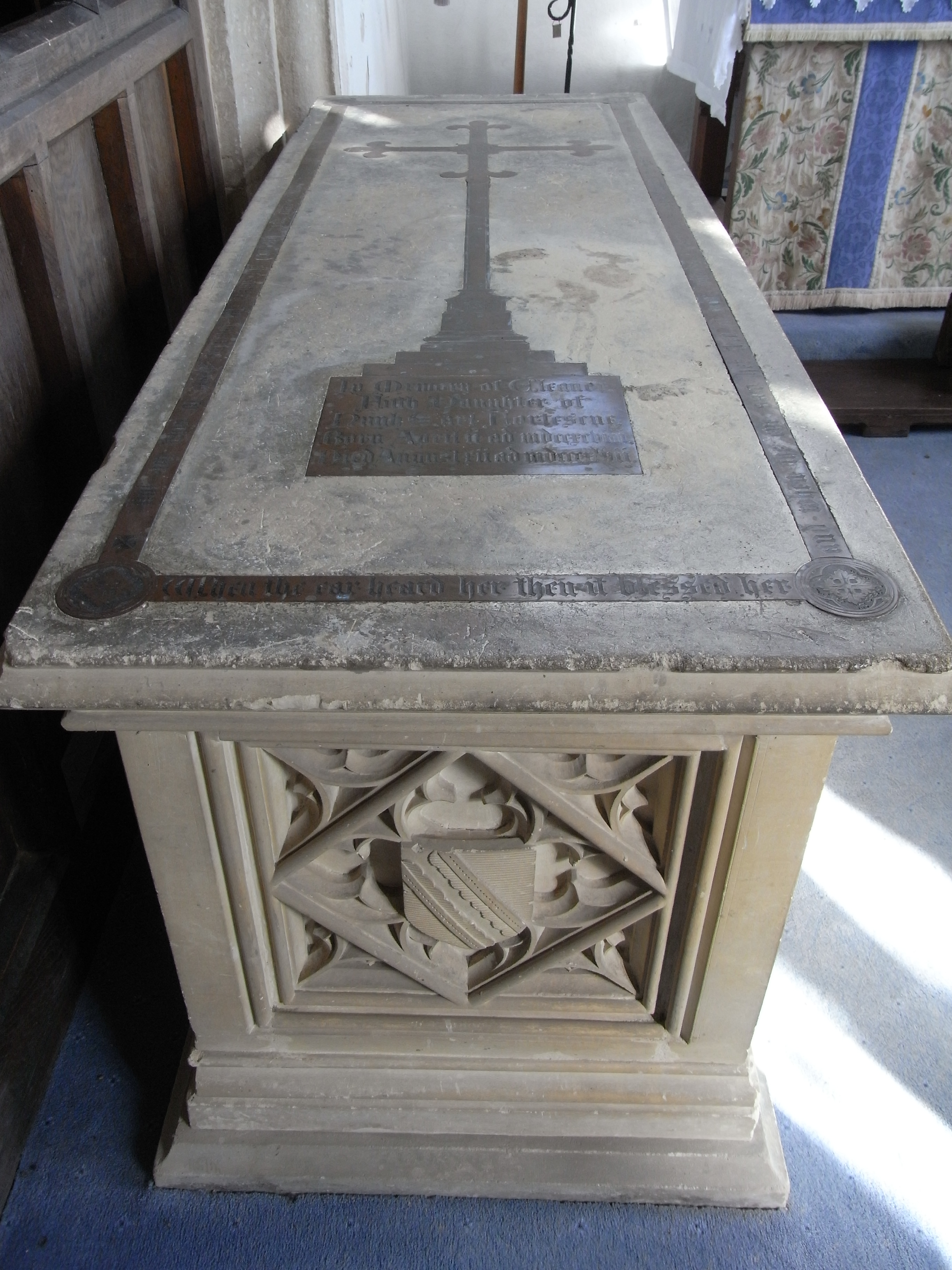
Chest tomb of Lady Eleanor Fortescue (1798–1847), chancel of Weare Giffard Church

Against the north wall of the chancel stands the chest tomb, in imitation of a mediaeval model, of Lady Eleanor Fortescue (1798–1847), fifth daughter of Hugh Fortescue, 1st Earl Fortescue (1753–1841). The following text is inscribed on a ledger line around the edge of the top slab, amended from Job's Parable, Book of Job 29: 11–13, from 1st person speaking to third:

"When the ear heard her then it blessed her and when the eye saw her then it gave witness to her because she delivered the poor that cried and the fatherless and him that had none to help him. The blessing of him that was ready to perish came upon her and she caused the widows heart to sing for joy".

It is sculpted on the west end with a shield of the Fortescue arms and is inscribed on top:

"In memory of Eleanor fifth daughter of Hugh Earl Fortescue born April ii ad mdccxcviii died August xii ad mdcccxlvii"

== Governance ==
- Weare Giffard is governed by the six members of the Weare Giffard Parish Council who are elected every four years. One of the six councillors is elected Chairman for a term lasting twelve months. The Council meets four times a year in the Village Hall.
- Weare Giffard is represented in the House of Commons by the constituency of Torridge and West Devon. It is currently held by the Conservative Party in the person of Rt. Hon. Geoffrey Cox QC MP.

== See also ==
- Annery kiln, disused lime-kiln on opposite bank of River Torridge to Weare Giffard, in parish of Monkleigh
- John Brinsmead and Sons, piano manufacturer whose founder John Brinsmead (1814–1908) was born in the village

== Sources ==
- Risdon, Tristram, The Chronological Description or Survey of the County of Devon, London, 1811
- Cherry, B. & Pevsner, N., The Buildings of England: Devon, London, 2004, Weare Giffard, pp. 891–893
- Lauder, Rosemary, Devon Families, Tiverton, 2002, Fortescue, pp. 75–82
