= Denzil Holles (MP) =

Member of the Parliament of England (ca. 1538–1590)

Denzil Holles (ca. 1538 – 12 April 1590) JP of Irby upon Humber, was a member of parliament for East Retford.

Denzil Holles, the son of William Holles (MP), was given the manor of Irby upon Humber by his father, on the occasion of his marriage to Eleanor, daughter of Edmund Sheffield, 1st Baron Sheffield, in the mid-16th century. Holles was not an absentee landlord, spending much of his time in Irby. He made numerous improvements to the estate and was in the process of constructing a new manor house when he died in 1590. Writing in the 1600s, when the estate was owned by Denzil's son John Holles, 1st Earl of Clare, cousin Gervase Holles described it as:

...a place happy in the sweetness of the air and very delightful by the pleasant hills and dales, where there are dry and inviting walks both summer and winter, with a welcome prospect towards the sea; affording as good hawking and hunting, and as good conveniency for training and airing young horses, as can be found anywhere.

He married Eleanor Sheffield, daughter of Edmund Sheffield, 1st Baron Sheffield. The baptism of at least five of his children are recorded in the parish registers. They include:

- William Holles (1562–1637);
- John Holles, 1st Earl of Clare (1564–1637);
- Frances Holles (b. 1566) married Francis Cooke of Trusley;
- Jane Holles (b. 1568) married Thomas Sanderson;
- Anne Holles;
- Thomas Holles married Gertrude.

He served as a captain under Ambrose Dudley, 3rd Earl of Warwick putting down the Northern Rebellion in 1569.

He was appointed member of parliament for East Retford twice, in 1584, and again in 1586.

He died in April 1590 was buried in the chancel of the church at Irby upon Humber.
