= Filleigh =

Village in Devon, England

Coordinates: 51°02′06″N 3°54′36″W

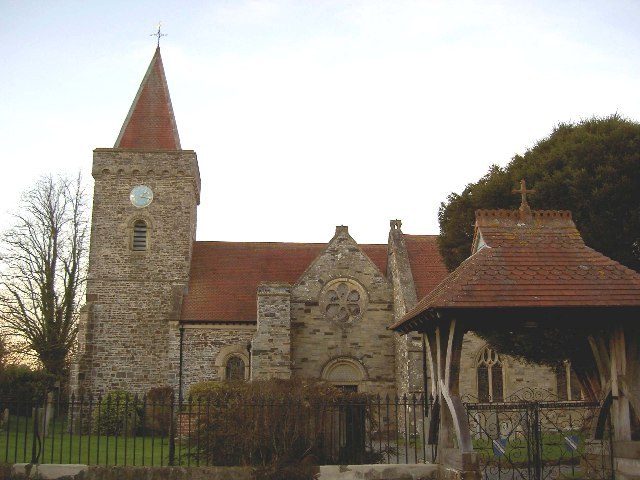
- St Paul's Church, Filleigh, viewed from south

- Location within Devon
- District: North Devon
- Shire county: Devon
- Region: South West
- Country: England
- Sovereign state: United Kingdom
- Police: Devon and Cornwall
- Fire: Devon and Somerset
- Ambulance: South Western

Filleigh /faɪliː/ is a small village, civil parish and former manor in North Devon, on the southern edge of Exmoor, 3.5 miles (5.6 km) west of South Molton. The village centre's street was, until the 1980s opening of the North Devon Link Road, the main highway between the North Devon administrative centre of Barnstaple and South Molton, leading westwards to Taunton. Much of the village's land is contained within grade I listed park and garden, Castle Hill, which straddles both sides of the Link Road providing a glimpse of some of it.

== History ==
=== Manor ===
Domesday

Baldwin the sheriff has 1 estate which is called Filleigh, which Osfrith held on the day that King Eadweard was alive and dead, and it paid 〈geld〉 for 4 virgates. 8 ploughs can plough these. Of it Baldwin has 1 virgate and 3 ploughs in demesne and the villans 2 virgates and 6 ploughs. There Baldwin has 9 villans and 6 bordars and 3 slaves and 3 swineherds, who pay 15 pigs, and 14 beasts and 10 pigs and 60 sheep and 10 acres of woodland and 7 acres of meadow and 30 acres of grazing-land; and it is worth 3 pounds a year and, when he received it, it was worth as much 40 shillings.

==== De Filleigh ====
The manor was held in the 14th century by a family which took its name from the manor, de Filleigh. The family also held lands within the neighbouring settlements of East Buckland, Bray and Charles.

==== Denzell ====
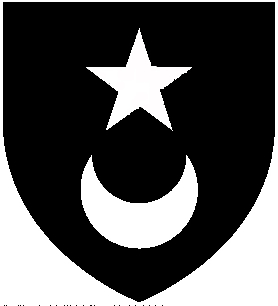
Arms of Denzell: Sable, a mullet in chief and a crescent in base argent. These arms survive sculpted in stone on the monument to Sir Richard de Pomeroy (1442–1496), in Berry Pomeroy Church

On default of male heirs, the manor passed by marriage to the Denzell (or Densyll etc.) family. This family originated from Denzell manor in St Mawgan parish, near St Columb Major, near Newquay, Cornwall. The senior line became extinct in the male line on the death of John Denzel (died 1535), sergeant-at-law and Attorney-General to the Queen Consort, Elizabeth of York. He held large estates in Cornwall and left two daughters as his co-heiresses, Ann who married Sir William Holles (1509–1591), later Lord Mayor of London, and another daughter who married into the Roskymer family. It was a cadet branch of this family which had acquired the de Filleigh lands by marriage. The arms of Denzell were: Sable, a mullet in chief and a crescent in base argent. These arms can be seen sculpted on a bench-end, c. 1510, in Weare Giffard Church, where exist others adorned with Fortescue arms and those of other heiresses who brought possessions to the Fortescue family. The Denzell arms are also shown in the second quarter of the arms of Richard Fortescue (died 1570) on his monumental brasses in Filleigh Church.

==== Fortescue ====
In 1454 Sir Martin Fortescue (died 1472), second son of Sir John Fortescue (1395–1485), Chief Justice, of Ebrington Manor in Gloucestershire, married Elizabeth Densyll (d.1508), a daughter and co-heiress of Richard Densyll of Filleigh, and thereby the manor became a possession of the Fortescue family, together with substantial other Densyll manors including Weare Giffard, Buckland Filleigh, Combe and Tamerton. Elizabeth Denzell survived her first husband and remarried to Sir Richard de Pomeroy (1442–1496), KB, feudal baron of Berry Pomeroy, Devon, Sheriff of Devon in 1473. The Easter Sepulchre monument to Sir Richard Pomeroy and Elizabeth Denzell survives in St Mary's Church, Berry Pomeroy, with sculpted armorials, but is missing all its original monumental brasses, robbed before 1701, as described by the biographer Rev. John Prince (1643–1723), for many years vicar of Berry Pomeroy: "As for any monuments raised over the graves or sepulchres of the dead relating to this family there is only one remaining, now robbed of its former splendour. It is an altar-tomb under an arch in the north wall of the chancel raised near breast-high covered with a fair table of green marble which was sometime inlay'd with a coat of arms and a motto under of gilded brass or copper. On a rough marble stone about six-foot long and three deep fastened in the wall over the tomb and under the canopy were inlaid in like manner the effigies of four several persons in large proportion with labels proceeding out of their mouths. Also four smaller figures between as many escotcheons, (sic) all of gilded brass or copper. Which are long since become the prey of some greedy or childish hand. At the east end of this monument is Pomerai impailed with Denzil, at the west end single, which shew it was raised to the memory of Sir Richard Pomeroy and his lady, who was the daughter and heir of Denzil. The arch is finely fretted and flowered". The arms of Denzell A mullet in chief and a crescent in base impaled by Pomeroy, are sculpted in stone, but without any tinctures or colouring, under the east end of the arched alcove containing this monument and provide valuable confirmation of the form of the Denzell arms.

The Filleigh Estate, comprising 5,500 acres (22 km^{2}), together with Castle Hill mansion are still today privately owned by descendants of the Fortescue family.

== Church of St Paul ==
=== Old Church ===
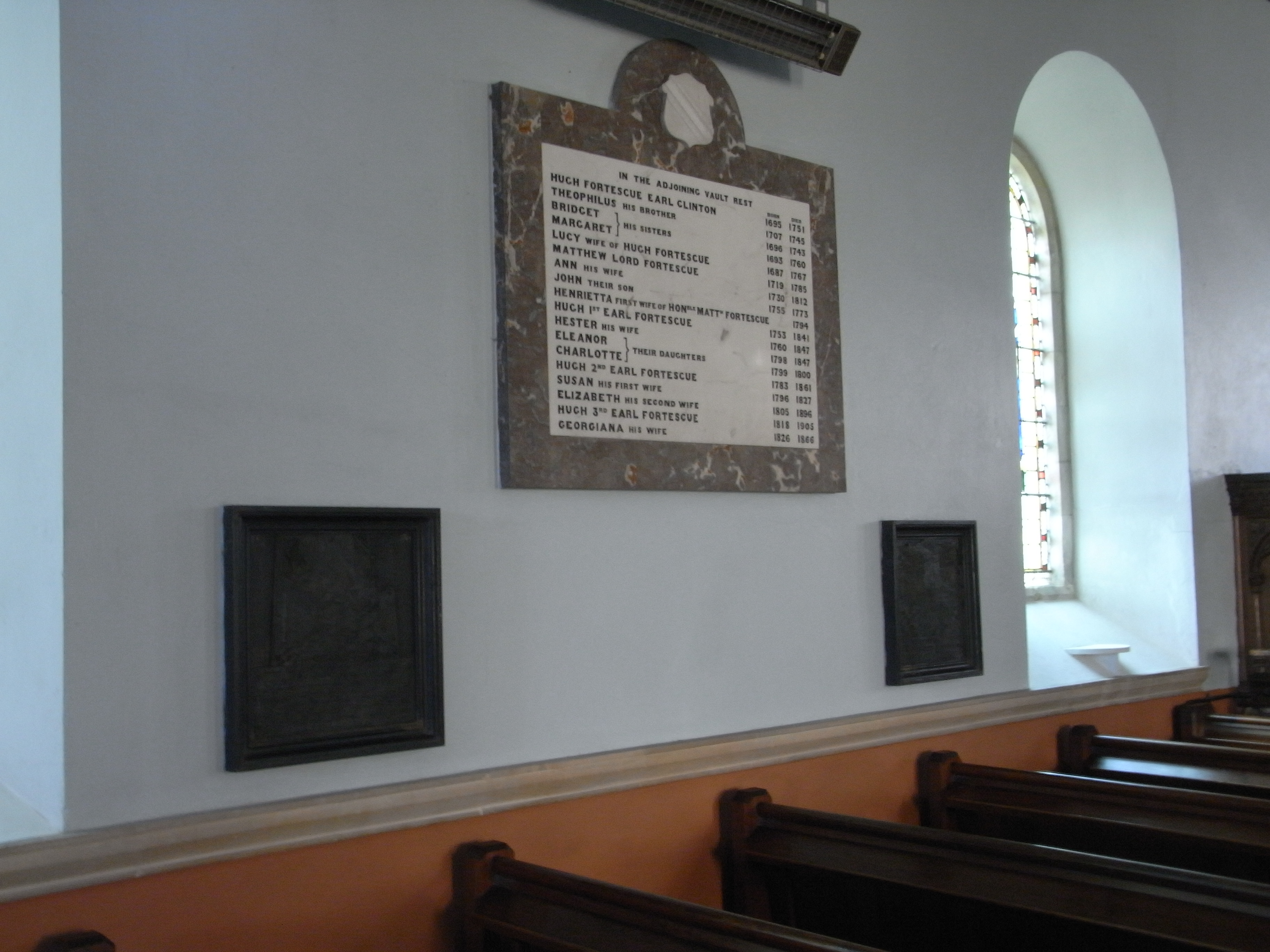
A list of Fortescues buried in the family vault on the church wall above two brasses from Richard Fortescue's tomb

The old mediaeval church was demolished by Lord Clinton in about 1730. The only surviving objects from the old church are two monumental brasses on the north wall of the nave of the new church which formerly adorned the now lost tomb-monument of Richard Fortescue (died 1570), great-grandson of Sir Martin Fortescue.

=== New Church ===
The present parish church of St Paul was built in 1732 on a new site 1/2-mile west of the new Palladian mansion of Castle Hill which was then being built by Lord Clinton. It was designed to be an "eye-catcher", visible from the terrace of Castle Hill. It was re-modelled in 1876–1877 to the plans of Clark of Newmarket, Gilbert Scott having been consulted on the plan in 1864, in a neo-Norman style, and resulted in the addition of a south aisle, now the "Fortescue Chapel", and chancel in the form of an apse. The Fortescue Chapel contains several mural monuments to members of that family.

== Castle Hill ==
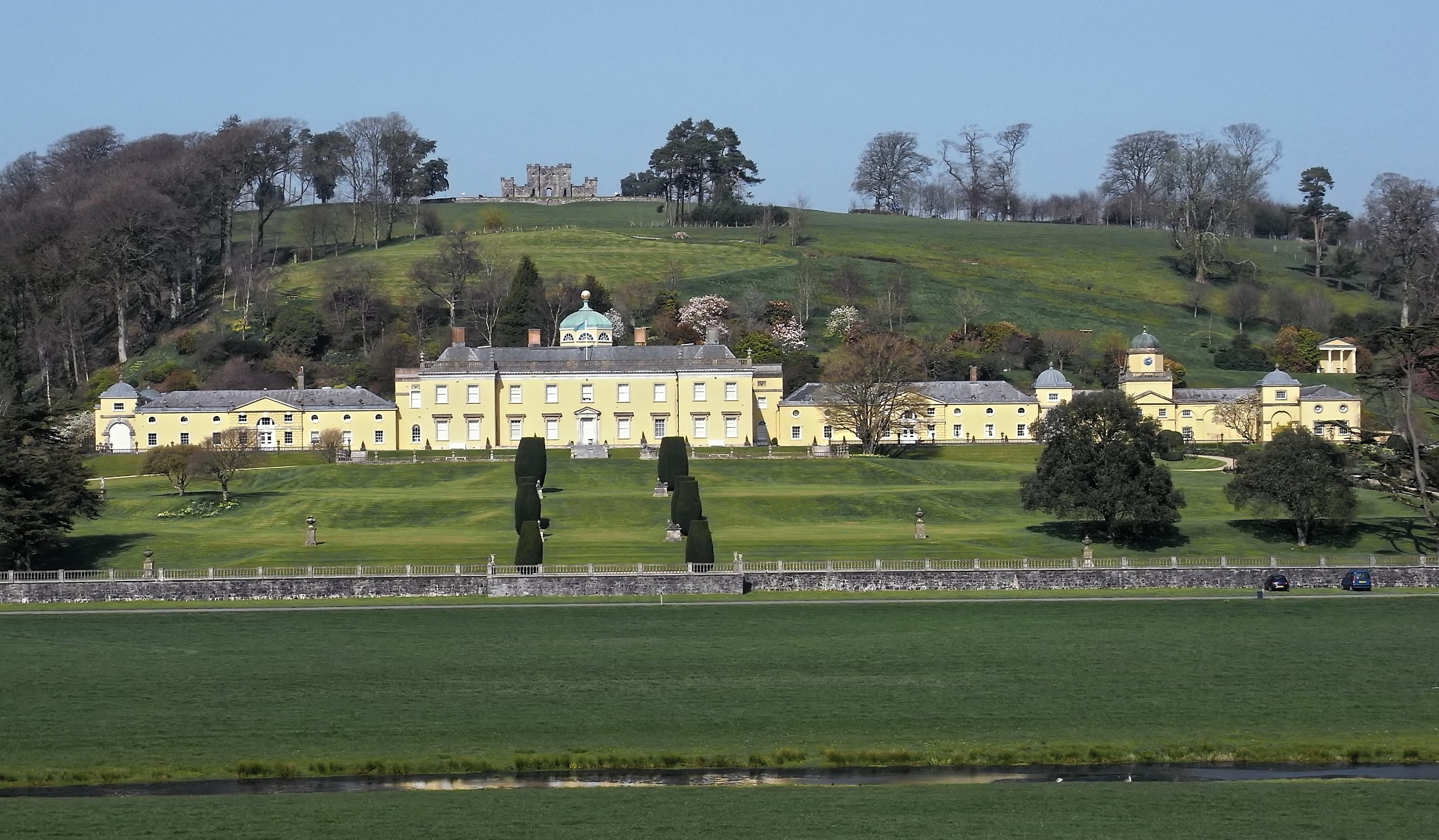
Castle Hill, Filleigh, south facade

Castle Hill is a privately owned Palladian country house built in 1730 by Hugh Fortescue, 14th Baron Clinton (1696–1751), who was created in 1751 Baron Fortescue of Castle Hill and Earl of Clinton. The house is occasionally opened to the public, whilst its surrounding garden and parklands are open to public access during spring and summer months. The Castle Hill estate borders the village.

Much of the land is included in the estate covering a substantial area. Its grade I status in terms of landscape is due to its diversity. Included are a series of ornamental drives through garden and woodland, mature and replanted woodland as well as follies, some of impressive façade size.

== Railway ==
In 1873, the Devon and Somerset Railway opened a line from Taunton to Barnstaple, including a station at Filleigh. This became part of the Great Western Railway in 1901, and closed in 1966.
