= Irby upon Humber =

Village in Lincolnshire, England

Coordinates: 53.526502°N 0.198324°W

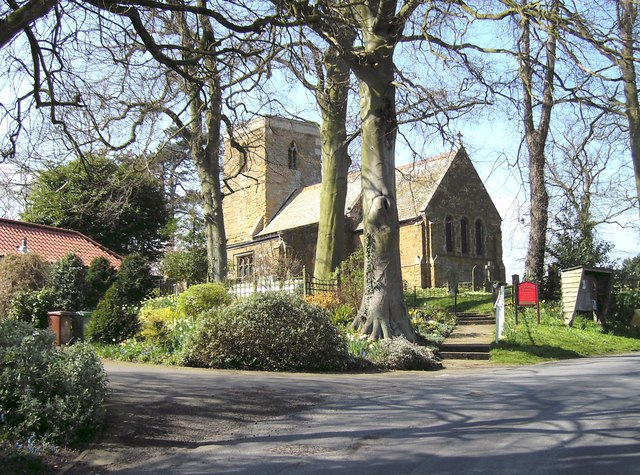
- St Andrew's Church, Irby

- Location within Lincolnshire
- Population: 128 (2011)
- OS grid reference: TA195048
  - London: 140 mi (230 km) S
- Civil parish: Irby
- Unitary authority: North East Lincolnshire
- Ceremonial county: Lincolnshire
- Region: Yorkshire and the Humber
- Country: England
- Sovereign state: United Kingdom
- Post town: Grimsby
- Postcode district: DN37
- Police: Humberside
- Fire: Humberside
- Ambulance: East Midlands
- UK Parliament: Brigg and Immingham

Irby upon Humber or Irby-on-Humber is a small village and (as just Irby) a civil parish in North East Lincolnshire, England. The village is situated on the A46 road, 1.5 miles (2.4 km) south-west of Laceby.

Village population at the 2001 census was 124, increasing to 128 at the 2011 Census. The residence of the Bishop of Grimsby is at Irby.

== History ==
The village shares part of its name with other places in England such as Irby in the Marsh and Irby, Merseyside. David Mills in A Dictionary of British Place-Names gives the meaning of Irby as 'settlement or village of the Irish'.

In the 11th-century Domesday Book, Irby's population of 11 villagers, 7 smallholders, 52 freemen, in over 70 households, was considered 'very large'. St Andrew's Church, with 12th-century nave features and a 13–14th-century tower, was built on the site of an earlier church mentioned in the Domesday record.

Denzil Holles, a grandson of the Lord Mayor of London William Holles, was given the manor of Irby by his father, on the occasion of his marriage to Eleanor, daughter of Edmund Sheffield, 1st Baron Sheffield, in the mid-16th century. Holles was not an absentee landlord, spending much of his time in Irby, and the baptisms of at least five of his children are recorded in the parish registers. He made numerous improvements to the estate and was in the process of constructing a new manor house when he died in 1591.

Writing in the 1600s, when the estate was owned by Denzel's son John Holles, 1st Earl of Clare, cousin Gervase Holles described it as:

...a place happy in the sweetness of the air and very delightful by the pleasant hills and dales, where there are dry and inviting walks both summer and winter, with a welcome prospect towards the sea; affording as good hawking and hunting, and as good conveniency for training and airing young horses, as can be found anywhere.

In 1840, Irby and the surrounding parish had 263 inhabitants and a notable local industry was chalk quarrying in the area of the Dale.

== Geography ==
The Irby A46 bypass was 1.5 miles. The bypass opened on Saturday 12 December 1964, being built by A. Monk Ltd of Padgate in Warrington.
