= John Brinsmead and Sons =

John Brinsmead and Sons was a British piano manufacturer, founded by John Brinsmead in 1836.

== History ==
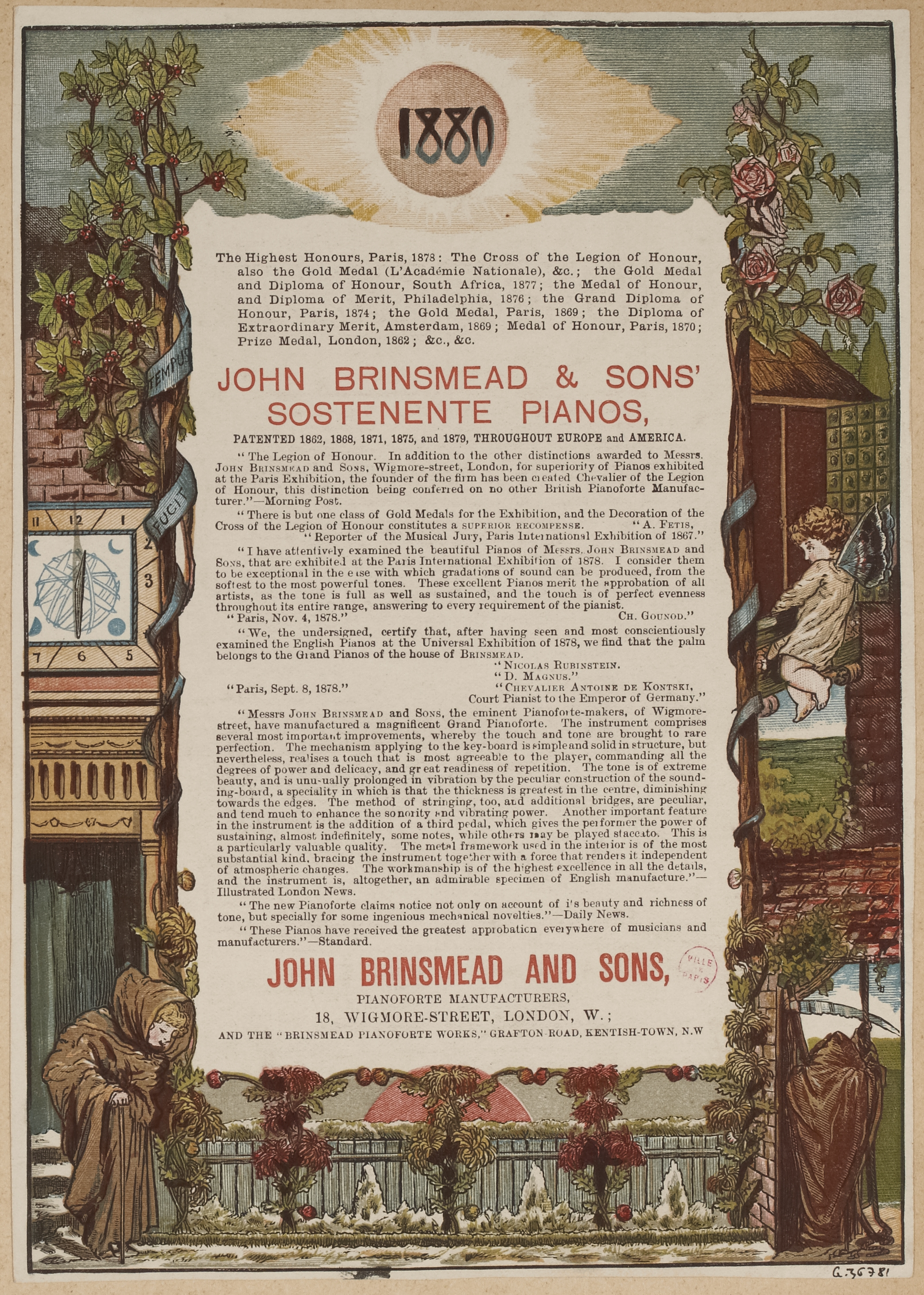
Advertisement, 1880

John Brinsmead, the founder and head of the firm, was born on 13 October 1814 in Weare Giffard, North Devon, a son of Henry Brinsmead, an innkeeper and lime burner, and his wife Elizabeth. After apprenticeship as a cabinet-maker in Great Torrington, he went by foot in 1835 to London, where he was a journeyman piano-case maker.

He began business as a piano maker in 1836, initially with his elder brother Henry (who left the following year) at 35 Windmill Street, Tottenham Court Road. He later moved to neighbouring Charlotte Street, and to workshops in Chenies Street in 1841. The next move was to 18 & 20 Wigmore Street, in 1863, when his sons Thomas (1844–1906) and Edgar (1848–1907) were taken into partnership. A large factory was built after 1870 in Grafton Road, Kentish Town. The company gained a reputation for building expensive, well made pianos, and its products were exported across Europe.

In recognition of exhibits in the Paris Exhibition of 1878, John Brinsmead was awarded the Legion of Honour by the French government. In 1883, the company gained the right to place "Pianoforte Makers to HRH the Prince of Wales" on their pianos.

=== Twentieth century ===
The firm became a private limited company in 1900, and at that time employed more than 200 men. John Brinsmead died on 17 February 1908 and is buried on the west side of Highgate Cemetery. His two sons in the business had predeceased him, and his grandson, the managing director Henry Billinghurst (1874–1955) took over the company. The company became bankrupt in January 1920, after a period of skilled labour shortage and industrial unrest. In 1921 it was purchased by J.B. Cramer & Co., which made pianos under the name John Brinsmead Ltd; this company was purchased by Kemble & Co in 1960.
