= William Holles =

Lord Mayor of London (1471?–1542)

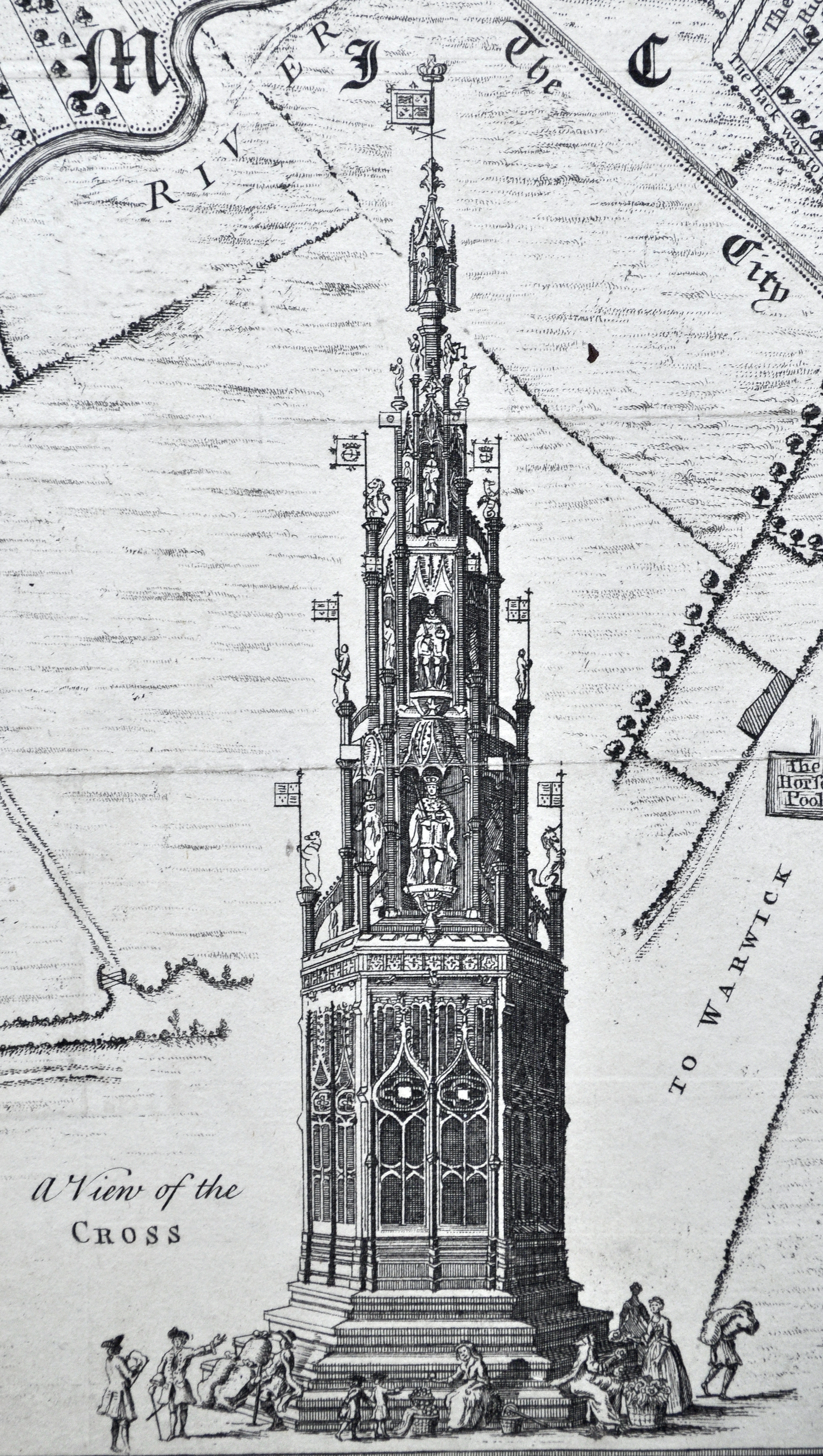
Coventry Cross funded by William Holles and erected in 1544 as shown on Bradford's Map 1748/9

Sir William Holles (or Hollis) (1471?– 20 October 1542) was a British tradesman and politician in 15th and 16th centuries. He rose from apprenticeship to a mercer to become master warden of his company and Lord Mayor of London in 1539.

== Life ==
William Holles was admitted to the freedom of the Worshipful Company of Mercers on 17 September 1499 and became master of the company in 1528. He was elected Sheriff of London in 1527.

He was knighted by Henry VIII in 1533 and became Lord Mayor of London on St Edward's Day, 13 October, 1539. On 3 January 1539–40 he received in great state Anne of Cleves on her way through the city before her marriage On 4 February, Holles and the Aldermen accompanied the king and queen by water to Westminster.

Holles was a wealthy merchant, and besides two houses in London, one in Bishopsgate Street, where he kept his mayoralty, and another in the parish of St Mary-le-Bow, acquired several manors in Derbyshire, Nottinghamshire, Staffordshire, Middlesex and Essex. He also was the owner of Clement's Inn in the Strand.

== Death and legacy ==
He died at his house in London on 13 October 1542, and was buried in St Helen's Church, Bishopsgate, where a monument to his memory was erected in the middle of the north aisle. His property portfolio passed down through several generations of the family and became the basis of the property owned by the Earl of Clare. He left the bulk of the estate to his grandson William (grandfather of John Holles, 1st Earl of Clare).

He left £200 (equivalent to £59,625 in 2025) in his will to pay for the Coventry Cross which was built in 1544, and taken down in 1771. A replica was unveiled in 1976.

== Family ==
He was the son of Thomas Holles of Stoke, Coventry. He married Elizabeth, daughter of George Scopham. Lady Elizabeth Holles died on 13 March 1543, and was buried in St Helen's Church, Bishopsgate. By her will she endowed six almshouses for that parish, leaving the care of their erection to her executor, Sir Andrew Judd.

They had three sons and two daughters

- Thomas Holles
- Sir William Holles (1509–91), who developed Haughton Hall in Haughton, Nottinghamshire, and married Anne, daughter of John Denzel, of Denzel, Cornwall.
- Francis Holles
- Anna Holles
- Joanna Holles
