= John Denzel =

Estate holder in Cornwall (died 1535)

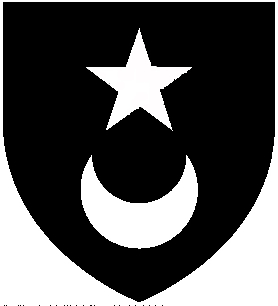
Arms of Denzell: Sable, a mullet in chief and a crescent in base argent

John Denzel (died 1535) held large estates in Cornwall and became serjeant-at-law and Attorney-General to the Queen Consort, Elizabeth of York. He had at least two daughters who became his co-heiresses, of whom Ann married Sir William Holles (1509–91) who became Lord Mayor of London. Another daughter married into the Roskymer family.

== Denzell manor ==
His home was the barton and manor of Denzell, in the parish of St Mawgan in Cornwall, which belonged to an ancient family of that name.

== Cadet branch ==
A cadet branch of the family had earlier acquired by marriage lands in North Devon, which were subsequently held from 1454 to the present by the Fortescue family. In 1454 Sir Martin Fortescue (d.1472), second son of Sir John Fortescue (1395–1485), Chief Justice, of Ebrington Manor in Gloucestershire, married Elizabeth Densyll, the daughter and heiress of Richard Densyll of Filleigh, and thereby the manor became a possession of the Fortescue family, together with substantial other Densyll manors including Weare Giffard, Buckland Filleigh, Combe and Tamerton. The Fortescue family quartered the arms of Denzell in the second quarter of greatest honour, and the Denzell arms may be seen sculpted on a bench end from c. 1510 in Weare Giffard Church.

== Armorials ==
The Arms of Denzell are blazoned as: Sable, a mullet in chief and a crescent in base argent.
