= William Holles (MP) =

16th-century English politician (1509/10–1591)

Sir William Holles (1509/10 – 18 January 1591) JP of Haughton, Nottinghamshire was a member of parliament for Nottinghamshire and also High Sheriff of Nottinghamshire, Derbyshire and the Royal Forests.

He was born the second son of William Holles of Haughton, and Elizabeth, daughter of George Scopham. He married Anne Denzell, daughter of John Denzel of Cornwall on 20 May 1535. After her death he married Ida Grosvenor, daughter of Sir Richard Grosvenor of Cheshire, around 1570.

His children were:

- Denzil Holles (b. ca. 1538 – 12 April 1590) married Eleanor Sheffield, daughter of Edmund Sheffield, 1st Baron Sheffield
- Gervase Holles
- Gertrude Holles

He was elected to parliament in October 1553 as member for Nottinghamshire.

He was elected a Knight of the Carpet on 22 February 1547, two days after the coronation of King Edward VI.

He died on 26 January 1591 and was buried in the family chapel dedicated to St James at his house at Haughton Hall, Nottinghamshire.
