= Haughton, Nottinghamshire =

Coordinates: 53.24697°N 0.98239°W

Haughton
- Civil parish
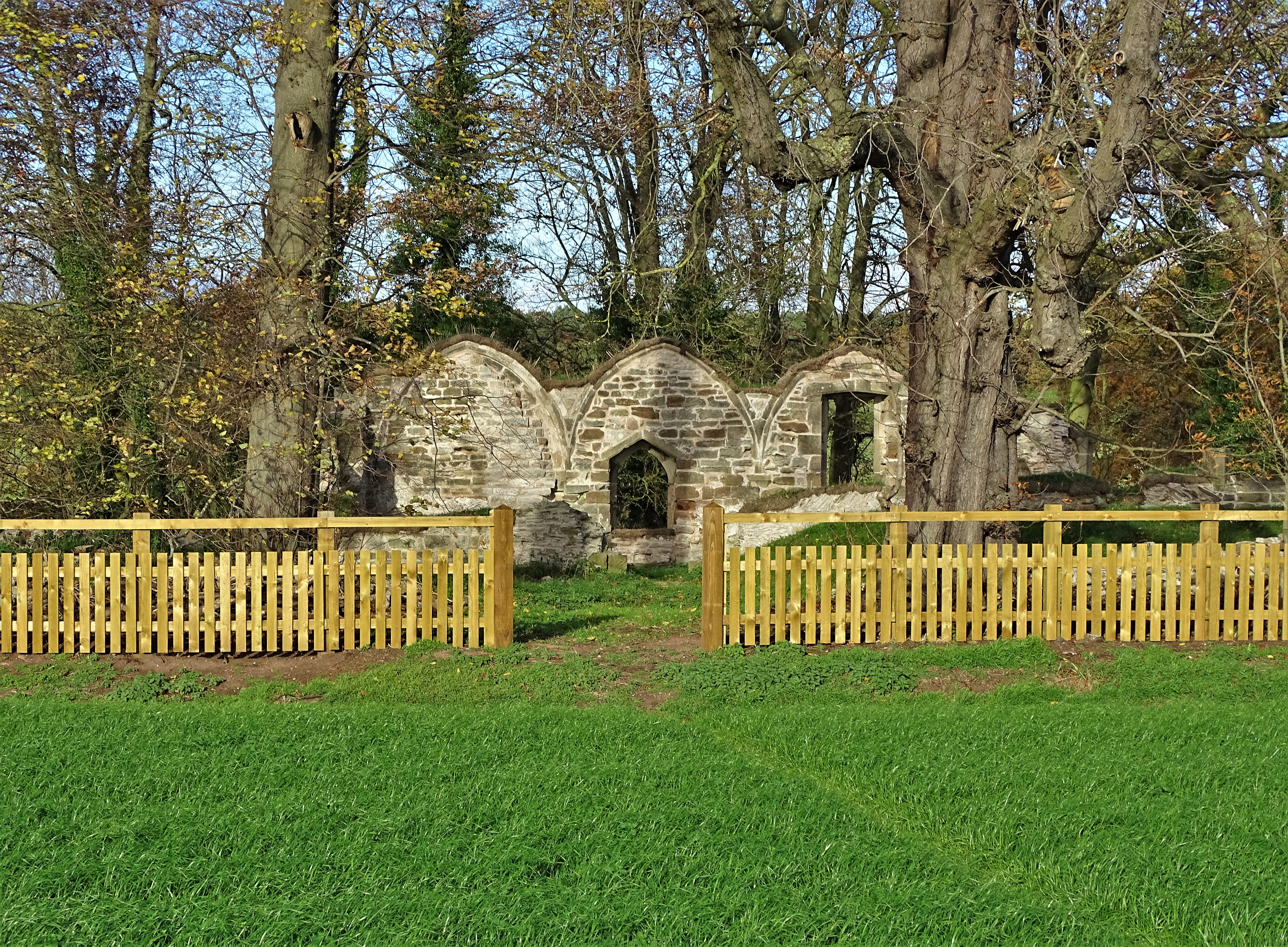
- Part-restored ruin of Haughton Chapel

- Location within Nottinghamshire
- Interactive map of Haughton
- Area: 1.59 sq mi (4.1 km^{2})
- Population: 40 (2021)
  - Density: 25/sq mi (9.7/km^{2})
- OS grid reference: SK 678726
  - London: 125 mi (201 km) SE
- Civil parish: Bothamsall
- District: Bassetlaw
- Shire county: Nottinghamshire
- Region: East Midlands
- Country: England
- Sovereign state: United Kingdom
- Post town: RETFORD
- Postcode district: DN22
- Dialling code: 01623
- Police: Nottinghamshire
- Fire: Nottinghamshire
- Ambulance: East Midlands
- UK Parliament: Newark

Haughton is a hamlet in the English county of Nottinghamshire.

Haughton lies on the south bank of the River Maun about one mile south west from Bothamsall (where the population is included). Administratively it forms part of the Bassetlaw district.

The population as recorded in the UK 2021 census was 40 residents.

== See also ==
- Listed buildings in Haughton, Nottinghamshire
- Haughton Hall, Nottinghamshire
