= Guillaume Charlier =

Belgian sculptor

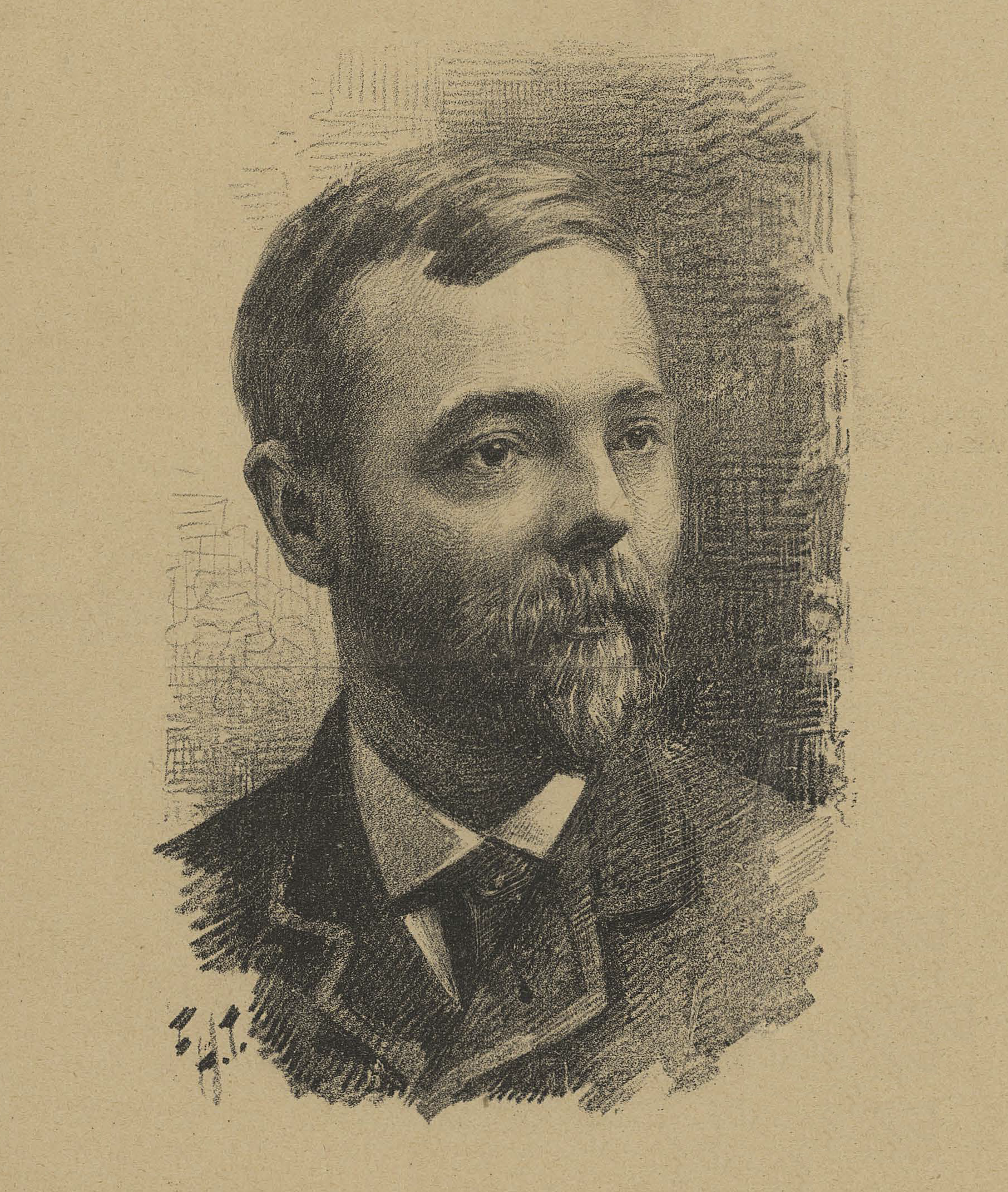
Portrait of Guillaume Charlier by Ch. Tichon 1889

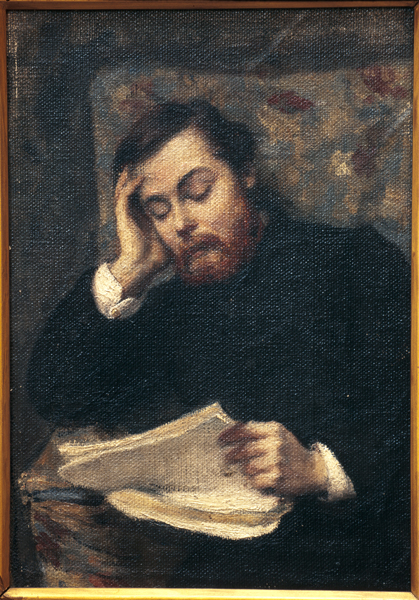
Portrait of Guillaume Charlier by Eugène Broerman (Musée des Beaux-Arts de Tournai)

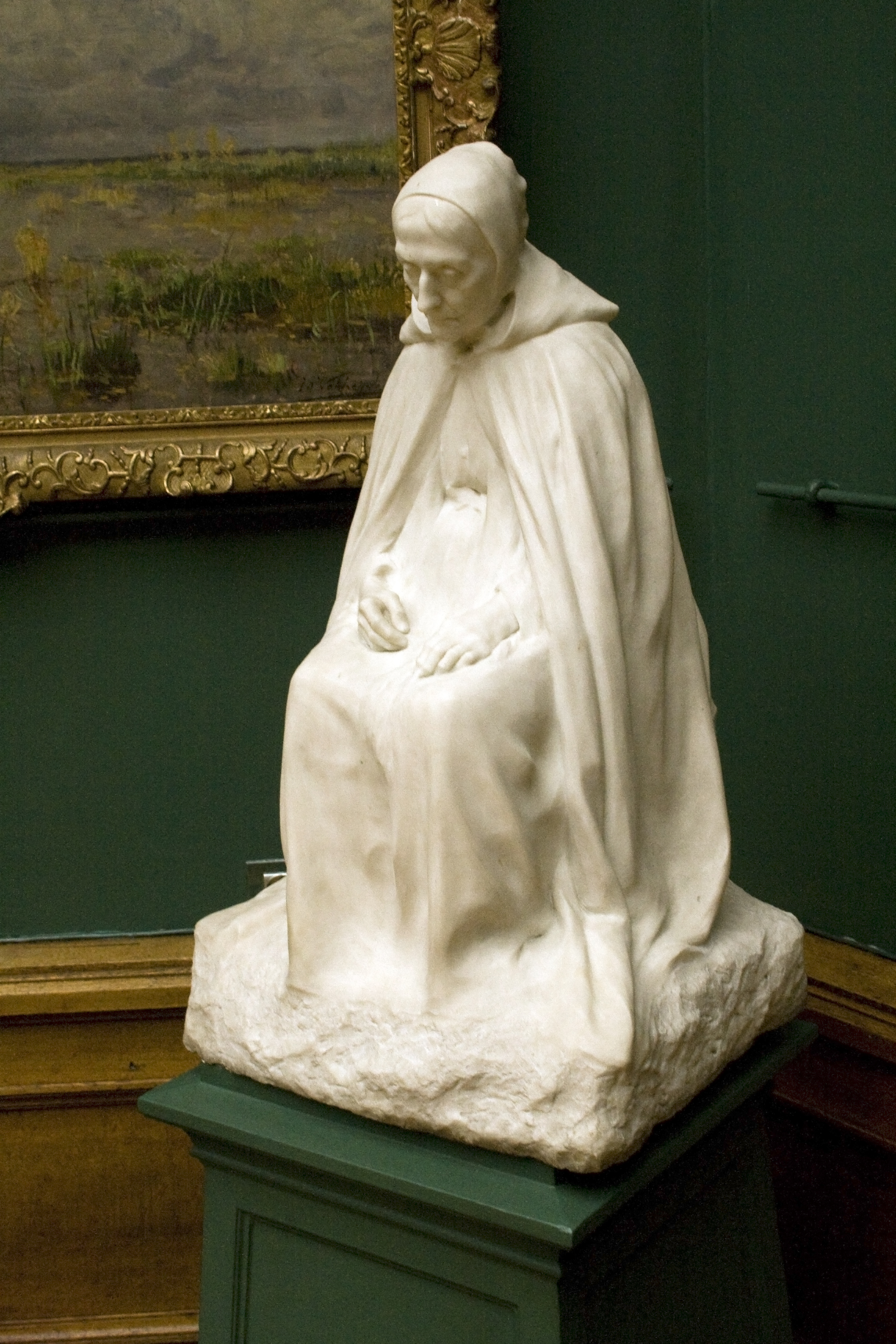
Old Lady, Charlier Museum

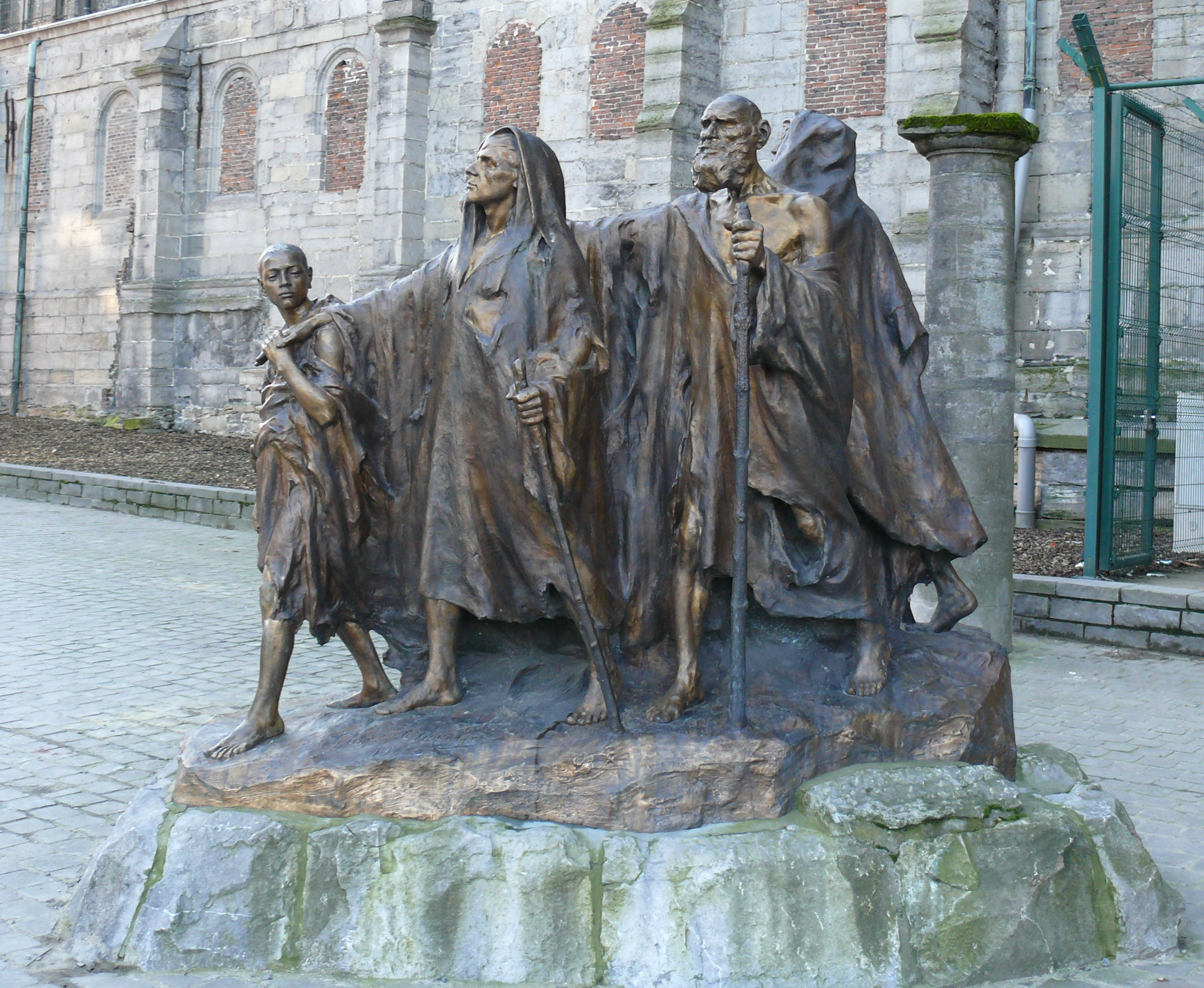
Charlier, Les aveugles ("The Blind Men"), Tournai

Guillaume Charlier (1854–1925) was a Belgian sculptor, most of whose works are now kept in the Charlier Museum in Saint-Josse-ten-Noode.

== Life ==
Charlier was born in Ixelles, the eldest son of a large family. He was 15 years old in 1870 when his father died and he was obliged to become the family's breadwinner. In 1880, Henri Van Cutsem, an art collector and patron of artists, bought his first works. Charlier spent some months in Italy where he came into contact with ancient art. He was also interested in the ordinary man in the street. He was also a portraitist. He was a member of the Société Nationale des Beaux-Arts and became a member of the Groupe des XX in 1885, when the sculptor Jef Lambeaux resigned from it.

In 1904 Henri Van Cutsem, his patron, died and bequeathed him the house in the Avenue des Arts in Saint-Josse-ten-Noode where he had been living and working. When Charlier himself died in 1925 his will left the house to the Commune of Saint-Josse-ten-Noode on condition that it should be opened to the public as a museum, as it was in 1928.

Charlier is buried in the Cemetery of Saint-Josse-ten-Noode.

His works are now in Brussels in the Charlier Museum, in Tournai in the collections of Henry Van Cutsem now held by the Musée des Beaux-Arts de Tournai and in Blankenberge.
