= Quarles van Ufford =

Dutch family of English descent

- noble family
- Country: Netherlands; United Kingdom
- Founded: 16th century
- Founder: John Quarles

Quarles van Ufford (also: Quarles or Quarles de Quarles, stemming from Quarles) is a Dutch family of English descent, whose members have belonged to Dutch nobility since 1815.

== History ==
The lineage started with William Quarles from Norfolk whose son John is first mentioned in 1524. John Quarles was warden of the broadcloth buyers guild in London in 1570. Willem († 1688), a lineal descendant born in England, who was employed by the VOC, settled in the Netherlands and became warden of the Bailiff of Schieland (bailiwick) in 1670. He was ancestor to the Dutch Quarles lineages.

His grandson Willem Quarles de Quarles (1717–1781), was appointed Baron of the Holy Roman Empire on 14 October 1751. Another grandson, Lodewijk (1719–1781), was ancestor to the lineage of Quarles van Ufford, belonging to the untitled nobility per 1815. 16 September 1815 Pieter Willem Lodewijk Quarles de Quarles (1758–1826) received confirmation of his title of Baron.

Alexandre Quarles van Ufford (1956) and his progeny are members of Belgian nobility since 1992. He is a son of the late Dutch ambassador Bryan Quarles van Ufford (1920–1975) who was married to the late Belgian Jonkvrouw Marie-Emilie van der Linden d'Hooghvorst (1918–1991).

== Scions ==
- Alexander Johan Quarles de Quarles (1845–1914), Governor of the Celebes Islands
- Carolina Frederika Henriette Quarles van Ufford (1887–1972), honorary citizen of Geldrop
- Cypriaan Gerard Carel Quarles van Ufford (1891–1985), Mayor and Queen's Commissioner
- Hendrik Quarles van Ufford (1822–1860), military officer
- Jacques Jean Quarles van Ufford (1788–1855), Minister of Marine ad int.
- Jan Hendrik Jacob Quarles van Ufford (1855–1917), member of the House of Representatives and of the Council of State of the Netherlands
- Johan Willem Quarles van Ufford (1882–1951), Queen's Commissioner
- Karel Frederik Quarles van Ufford (1880–1942), president of International Federation for Equestrian Sports
- Lili Byvanck-Quarles van Ufford (1907–2002), archaeologist
- Louis Albert Quarles van Ufford (born 1916), Mayor
- Bryan Edward Quarles van Ufford (1920–1975), Diplomat
- Louis Jacques Quarles van Ufford (1891–1971), member of sports organising committee
- Jonkheer Arnoud Robert Alexander Quarles van Ufford (1920–1979), half-brother of actress Audrey Hepburn
- Jonkheer Ian Edgar Bruce Quarles van Ufford (1924–2010), half-brother of actress Audrey Hepburn
- Maurits Lodewijk Quarles van Ufford (1910–1944), Mayor
- Wilhelm Herman Daniël Quarles van Ufford (born 1929), Mayor and director-general of the Kabinet der Koningin
- Jonkheer Pieter Quarles van Ufford (father-in-law of Hugh van Cutsem)
- Emilie (Quarles van Ufford) van Cutsem (widow of Hugh van Cutsem), a close friend of the British Royal family.
- Henriëtte Margriet Elisabeth Quarles van Ufford, president of the Dutch society for radiologists

== See also ==
- Quarles van Ufford pumping station
