= Henri Van Cutsem =

Belgian patron of the arts and painter

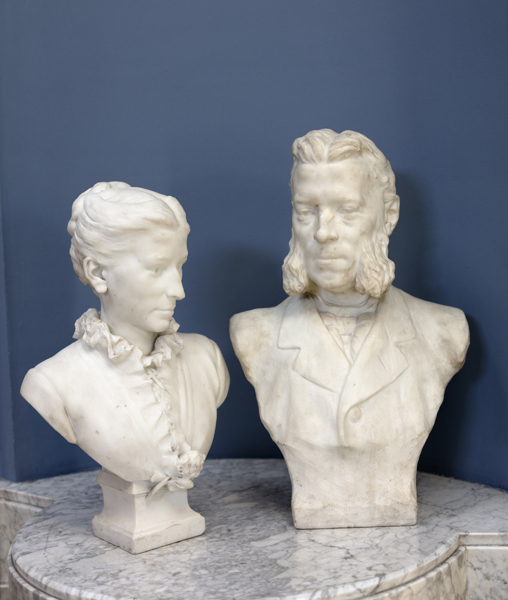
Guillaume Charlier: Marble busts of Henri Van Cutsem and his wife Léontine (née Van Opstal), Musée des Beaux-Arts, Tournai

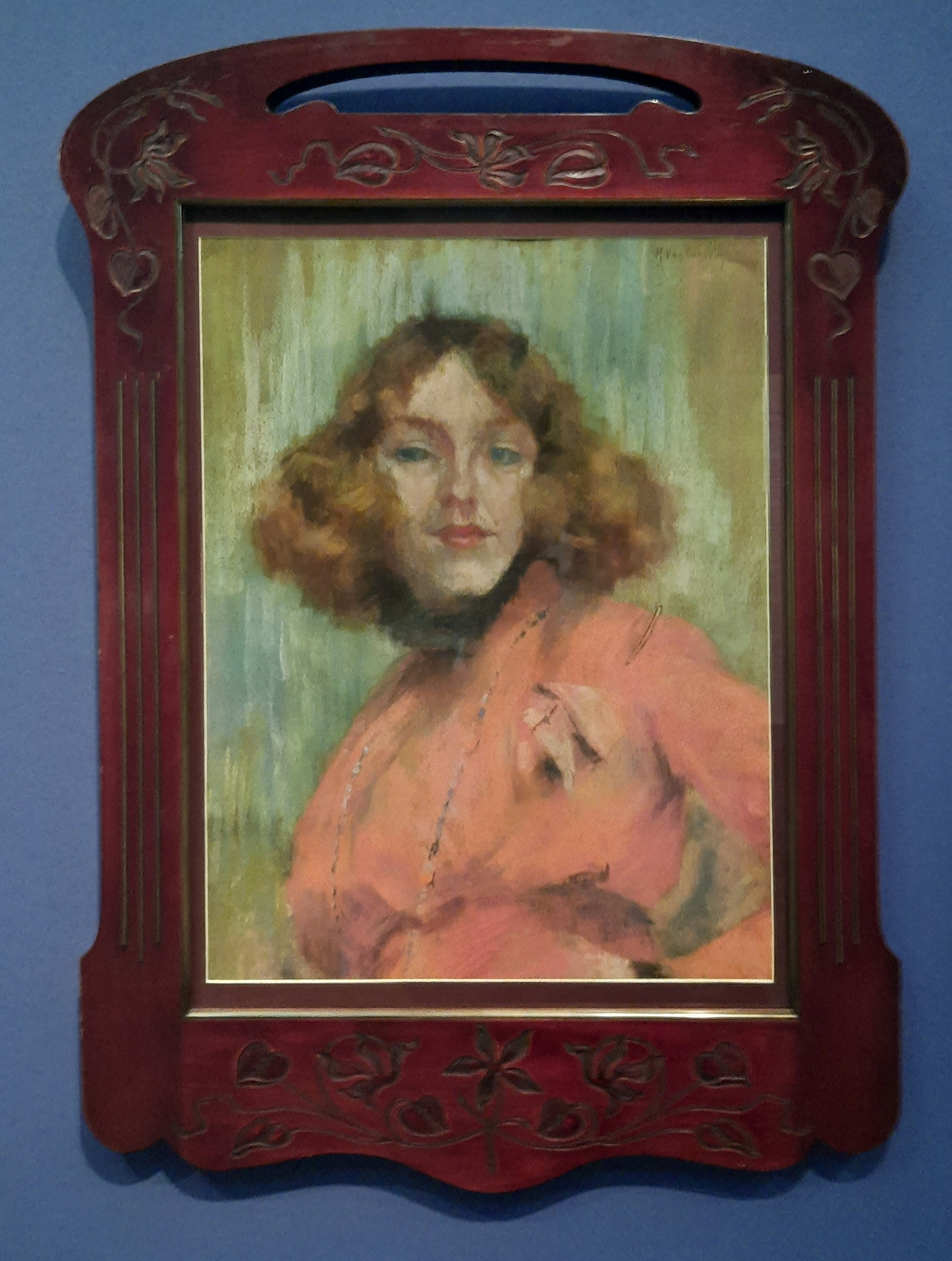
Henri Van Cutsem: Pastel portrait of Sarah Bernhardt, c. 1903, Reiss-Engelhorn-Museen, Mannheim

Henri-Émile Van Cutsem (1839–1904) was a Belgian patron of the arts, and also himself a painter

== Biography ==
Van Cutsem was born in Brussels into a family of hoteliers who had become wealthy from their business. He studied law at Liège. During long stays in Paris he developed good relations with many of the artistic community. In 1890 he acquired two adjacent blocks of flats on the Avenue des Arts in Saint-Josse-ten-Noode which he had refurbished by Victor Horta.

He died in Ochamps of pneumonia.

== Patronage ==
Van Cutsem developed his father's art collections and gave his moral and financial support to many artists, notably the sculptor Guillaume Charlier, to whom Van Cutsem bequeathed his property on the Avenue des Arts, which after Charlier's death became the Charlier Museum, established on 21 October 1928.

Among the many artists whom he supported were Édouard Agneessens, Théodore Baron, Géo Bernier, Jan Van Beers, Eugène Broerman, Albéric Collin, James Ensor, Joseph Stevens and Willy Finch.

== Legacy ==
Van Cutsem's collections were given to the Musée des Beaux-Arts in Tournai.
