= Hendrik Quarles van Ufford =

Dutch soldier, writer, and planter

- Born: 4 July 1822; Loosduinen
- Died: 15 June 1868 (aged 45); Ketandan
- Occupations: Soldier; Writer; Planter

Jonkheer Hendrik Quarles van Ufford (Loosduinen, 4 July 1822 - Ketandan, 15 June 1868), father of P. van Heerdt tot Eversberg-Quarles van Ufford, was a Dutch soldier, writer, and planter.

In 1842, he became a midshipman in the Dutch Royal Navy.

After rising to the rank of Lieutenant first class, he became an adjutant to the Governor-General of the Dutch East Indies AJ Duymaer van Twist. He accompanied him on his official journey through the Moluccas and anonymously produced the book Aanteekeningen betreffende eene reis door de Molukken (Item drawings concerning a journey through the Moluccas of the Governor-General AJ Duymaer van Twist,) published in The Hague in 1856.

In 1858 he was, at his request, honorably dismissed from the country's naval service. He settled at Ketandan, a village of what is now Indonesia, as an indigo planter.

On 2 December 1860, he married Anna Madeleine Scheltema, known as "Netje" (b. 3 Juni 1843). Because of the distance between his plantation and her home in Semarang, much of their courtship was conducted by letter. Their frank and warm correspondence shows them both strongly looking forward to their marriage. Hendrik's older brother Willem objected to the marriage. The Quarles van Ufford family is Dutch nobility, and Willem wanted Hendrik to find and marry a woman of similar rank. Netje, who had been born in Semarang, was an orphan from a non-noble Dutch family. Hendrik defended his choice, and married Netje. Together they had four children, the oldest of whom P. van Heerdt tot Eversberg-Quarles van Ufford became a well-known Dutch feminist and artist.

Hendrik died at Ketandan on 15 June 1868.
