= Hugh van Cutsem =

English landowner, banker, businessman and horse-breeder

- Born: Hugh Bernard Edward van Cutsem; 21 July 1941
- Died: 2 September 2013 (aged 72)
- Education: University of Cambridge
- Occupations: Landowner; Banker; Businessman; Horsebreeder
- Spouse: Emilie Quarles van Ufford (m. 1971)
- Children: 4
- Parent(s): Bernard van Cutsem; Mary Compton
- Relatives: Jonkheer Pieter Quarles van Ufford (father-in-law)
- Family: Van Cutsem family

Hugh Bernard Edward van Cutsem (21 July 1941 – 2 September 2013) was an English banker, businessman, landowner and horse-breeder.

== Early life and education ==
Hugh Bernard Edward van Cutsem was born on 21 July 1941, as a member of the Van Cutsem family. His father Bernard van Cutsem was a millionaire horse-trainer and -breeder. His mother was Mary Compton, a descendant of the chiefly line of Clan Farquharson. The van Cutsems were Catholics of Belgian origin who had moved to England in the nineteenth century.

He was educated at Sunningdale School and Ampleforth College, a Roman Catholic boarding school in Ampleforth, North Yorkshire, and graduated from the University of Cambridge. He then served as an officer in the Life Guards.

== Business career ==
Van Cutsem worked as an investment banker at Hambros Bank. Later he began his own company and purchased further companies, including a data storage company.

== Land ownership ==
Van Cutsem inherited his father's stud Northmore Farm in Exning near Newmarket, Suffolk, in 1976. He also owned a 4,000-acre estate in Norfolk, best known for its private wild game shoots. In 2001, the estate had thirty-five pairs of stone-curlews, a very rare bird. In addition he owned a hunting lodge and grouse moor managed for shooting interest on the North Yorkshire-Cumbria border. In the 1990s, he sold his father's farm in Exning and purchased the Hilborough estate in Norfolk, whence he transferred his horse-breeding operations. In 1994, he won a Country Landowners' Association award for his restoration of an old barn on the Hilborough estate; the Prince of Wales (later Charles III) presented the award.

He was a founding member of the Countryside Movement, a non-profit organization which later became the Countryside Alliance, focussed on shooting. He was also a significant fundraiser for the Game & Wildlife Conservation Trust, a British charity promoting game and wildlife management whilst working with the shooting and hunting community. Moreover, he served as Chairman of the Countryside Business Trust. He was also elected to the Council of the National Trust.

== Marriage and issue ==
On 10 June 1971, he married Emilie Quarles van Ufford, who was born in the Netherlands as the daughter of Jonkheer Pieter Quarles van Ufford, at Guards Chapel, Wellington Barracks. They had four sons:

- Edward Bernard Charles van Cutsem (born 1973); godson of King Charles III and a page boy at his wedding to Lady Diana Spencer; educated at Ampleforth College (1991), he graduated from Durham University (1995) with a degree in Combined Arts; formerly a managing director at BlackRock and more recently a venture capital investor; married Lady Tamara Katherine Grosvenor, daughter of Gerald Grosvenor, 6th Duke of Westminster, and Natalia Phillips, in 2004. They have three children:
  - Jake Louis Hannibal van Cutsem (born 2009)
  - Louis Hugh Lupus van Cutsem (born 2012)
  - Isla van Cutsem (born 2015)
- Hugh Ralph van Cutsem (born 1974); married Rose Nancy Langhorne Astor, daughter of David Waldorf Astor (a grandson of Waldorf Astor, 2nd Viscount Astor) and Clare Pamela St. John in 2005. They have three children:
  - Grace Emilie Clare van Cutsem (born 2007); goddaughter of the Prince of Wales and a bridesmaid at his wedding to Catherine Middleton.
  - Rafe Michael Waldorf van Cutsem (born 2009)
  - Charles Hugh Valentine van Cutsem; a page of honour to King Charles III.
- Nicholas Peter Geoffrey van Cutsem (born 1977); godfather to Prince Louis of Wales; married Alice Caroline Hadden-Paton, daughter of former cavalry officer Nigel Hadden-Paton, and sister of actor Harry Hadden-Paton, on 14 August 2009. They have one daughter:
  - Florence van Cutsem (born 2014); goddaughter of the Duke of Sussex and a bridesmaid at his wedding to Meghan Markle.
- William Henry van Cutsem (born 1979); godfather to Prince George of Wales; educated at Ampleforth College; married Rosanna Ruck-Keene on 11 May 2013.

For ten years the family rented Anmer Hall in Anmer, Norfolk, on the royal family's Sandringham estate. They later moved into a neo-Palladian mansion designed by architect Francis Johnson in Hilborough, on their estate.

A devout Catholic, he built a chapel near his Hilborough residence for family occasions, and arranged for priests to visit. However, he also regularly attended Mass at Our Lady of Pity in Swaffham with his family. In 1993, he was appointed a Knight of the Sovereign Military Order of Malta.

Hugh van Cutsem became a friend of King Charles III during his university days.

== Death and funeral ==
Van Cutsem died on 2 September 2013, aged 72. His funeral took place in Brentwood Cathedral in Essex and was conducted by Thomas McMahon, Bishop of Brentwood. Each of his four sons also gave a reading; Cardinal Cormac Murphy-O'Connor read the prayer of commendation; the choir sang "Pie Jesu". It was attended by the then Prince of Wales (later Charles III); his sons, Prince William and Prince Harry; and his wife, Camilla, then-Duchess of Cornwall; together with Andrew Parker Bowles; Prince Richard, Duke of Gloucester; Birgitte, Duchess of Gloucester; the Prince and Princess of Liechtenstein; Ralph Percy, 12th Duke of Northumberland; Gerald Grosvenor, 6th Duke of Westminster; and Natalia Grosvenor, Duchess of Westminster.
