= Lady Margaret Fortescue =

- Fortescue in 1948
- Born: 13 December 1923; Ebrington Manor, Chipping Campden, Gloucestershire, England
- Died: 25 May 2013 (aged 89); Castle Hill, Filleigh, Devon, England
- Occupations: Huntswoman and landowner
- Known for: One of the UK's largest private landowners
- Spouse: Bernard van Cutsem (m. 1948; div. 1968)
- Children: Two daughters
- Parent(s): Hugh Fortescue, 5th Earl Fortescue; Hon. Margaret Helen Beaumont
- Relatives: Wentworth Beaumont, 1st Viscount Allendale (grandfather); Arthur Gore, 9th Earl of Arran (son-in-law)

Lady Margaret Fortescue DL (13 December 1923 – 25 May 2013) was a British huntswoman and one of the country's richest private landowners, holding the Castle Hill estate and 20,000 acres (31 mi^{2}) of Exmoor.

== Early life ==
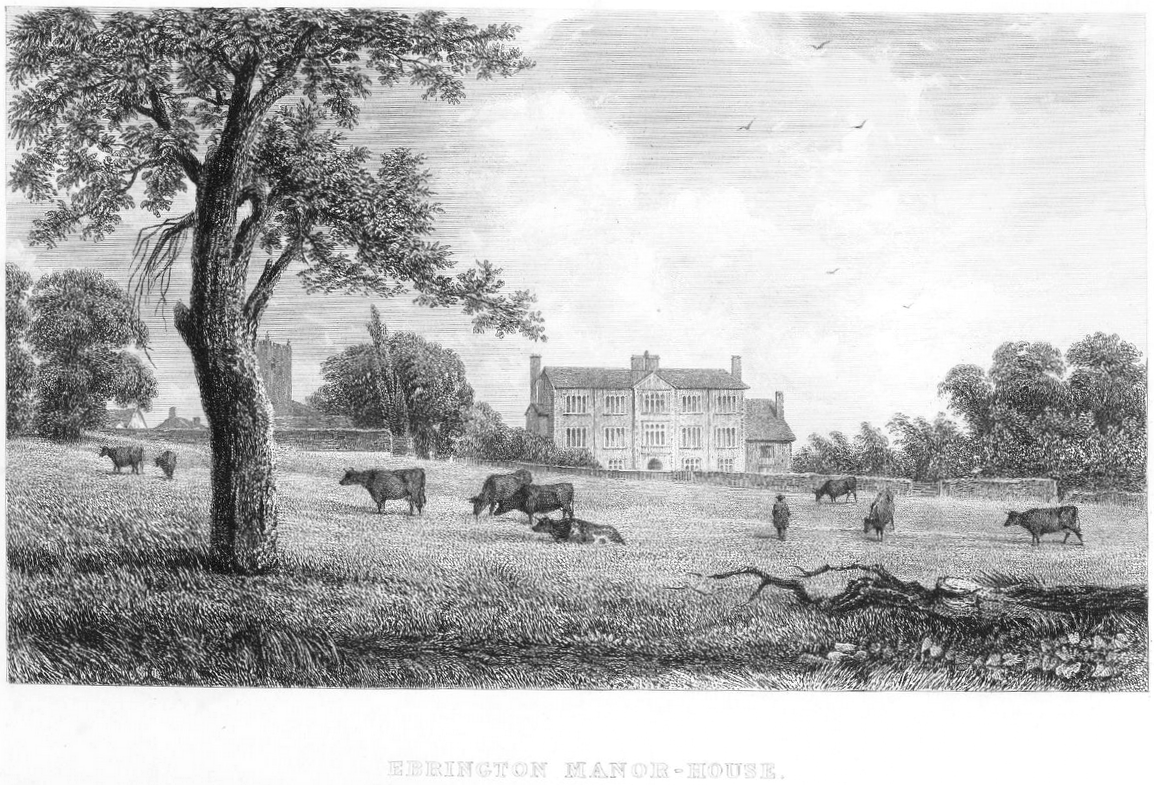
Ebrington Manor House, west front, 19th century engraving

Lady Margaret Fortescue was born on 13 December 1923 at Ebrington Manor, Chipping Campden, Gloucestershire, the elder daughter of Hugh Fortescue, 5th Earl Fortescue (1888–1958), and his wife, the Hon. Margaret Helen Fortescue, née Beaumont (1892–1958), the daughter of Wentworth Beaumont, 1st Viscount Allendale. She was educated at home by governesses in Castle Hill, then at a Swiss finishing school.

== Career ==
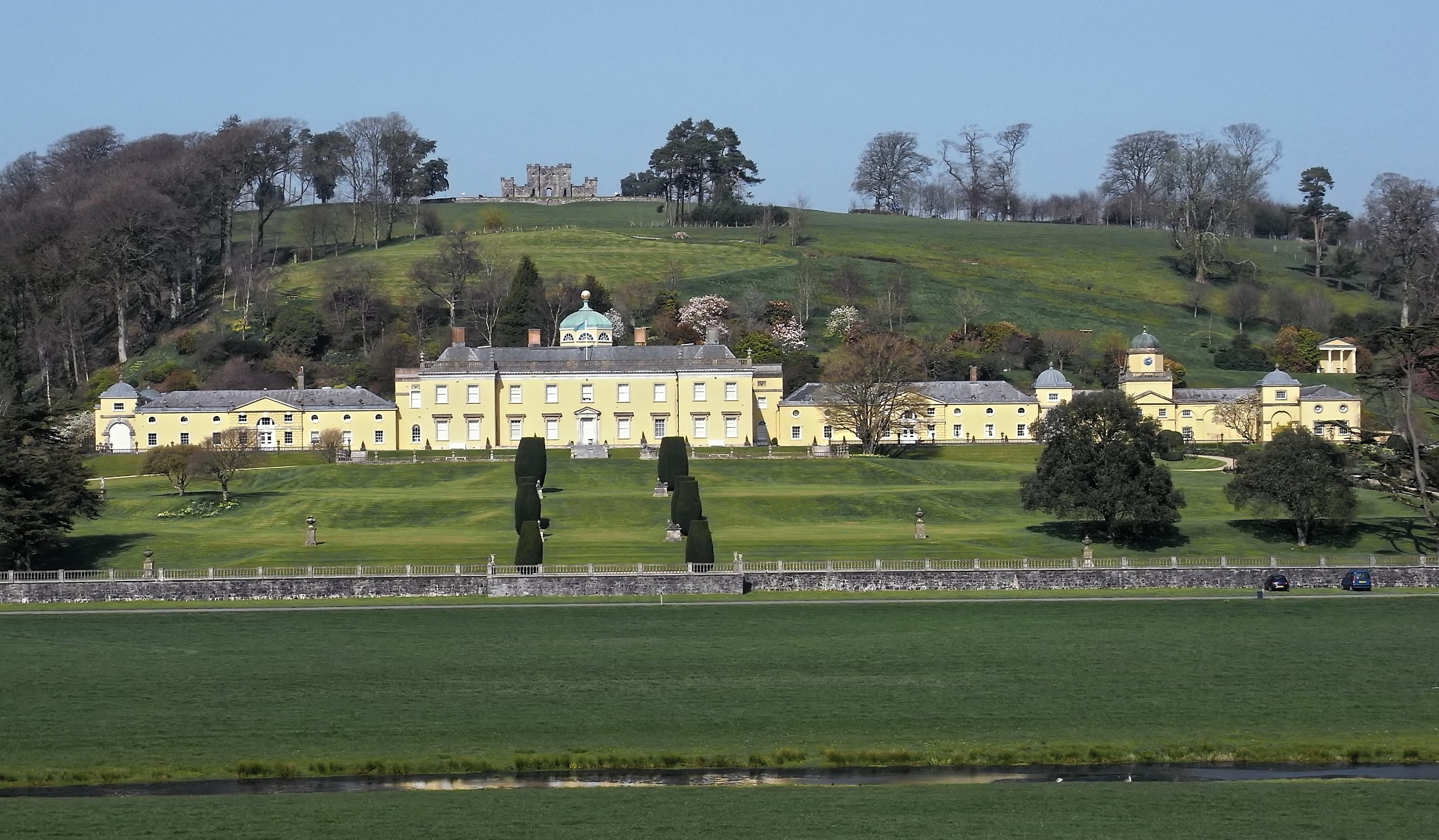
Castle Hill

During the Second World War, Fortescue worked in London's War Office as a secretary, and living in a Belgravia flat in known as "The Hovel", as well as in Cairo.

Fortescue was well known for riding side saddle. Fortescue was a fearless rider, and had several falls, and "after consulting her doctor and swallowing a few painkillers with wine, she almost invariably carried on".

In the 1950s, she travelled by private train, "with horses, grooms and a retinue of staff on board".

On her father's death in 1958, she inherited the Castle Hill estate, and became one of the country's largest private landowners.

Fortescue served as a Deputy Lieutenant of Devon.

== Family and death ==
On 31 July 1948, Fortescue married Bernard van Cutsem (1916–1975), a racehorse trainer and breeder, member of the Van Cutsem family. They had two daughters. The elder, Eleanor (b. 1949), married Arthur Gore, 9th Earl of Arran. She helped raise two stepsons from his first marriage. In 1966, she left him, retook her maiden name and divorced in 1968.

Fortescue died at the Garden House, Castle Hill, Filleigh, on 25 May 2013, survived by both daughters.
