= Bernard van Cutsem =

English horsebreeder and racehorse trainer (1916–1975)

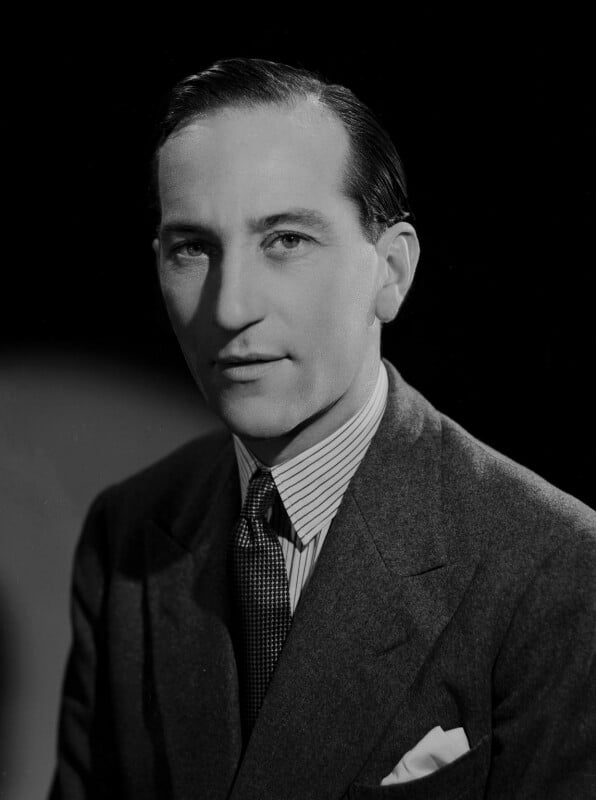
- Van Cutsem in 1948

Personal information
- Born: 23 January 1916 United Kingdom
- Died: 8 December 1975 (aged 59)
- Occupations: Breeder; Trainer

Horse racing career
- Sport: Horse racing

Major racing wins
- British Classic Race wins as trainer: 2000 Guineas (1)

Significant horses
- Park Top, Karabas, High Top, Crowned Prince, Sharpen Up, Noble Decree

Bernard Henry Richard Harcourt van Cutsem (23 January 1916 – 8 December 1975) was an English horsebreeder and racehorse trainer.

== Ancestry and early life ==
The van Cutsem family are Catholics, and of Belgian origin. The Van Cutsem family was said to descend from a illegitimate son of Henry II, Duke of Brabant, who was given a knighthood and an estate, called Cuetssem Velde, near Sint-Pieters-Leeuw. By the 13th century, the family possessed considerable land, and, by 1514, a property known as t'Hof van Cuetssem. Members of the family migrated to England in the 19th century.

Bernard Henry Richard Harcourt van Cutsem was born on 23 January 1916. His father was Henry Harcourt van Cutsem (1877–1917) and his mother, Eleanor Mary Josephine Southwell Trafford.

Van Cutsem attended Jesus College, Cambridge and served as a second lieutenant in the Life Guards during the Second World War.

== Career ==
Van Cutsem bred horses at Northmore Farm in Exning, near Newmarket, Suffolk, widely known as the birthplace and global centre of thoroughbred horse racing. He became a millionaire, thanks to his training and breeding of champion horses. For example, he trained High Top (1969–1988), Park Top and Sharpen Up (1969–1992). Moreover, he trained the winner of the Washington, D.C. International Stakes, the City and Suburban Handicap and the King George VI and Queen Elizabeth Stakes in 1969. Additionally, he trained the winners of the Blue Riband Trial in 1970, 1971 and 1972. He also trained the winner of the Dewhurst Stakes and the Seaton Delaval Stakes in 1971, the winners of the Observer Gold Cup in 1971 and 1972, and the winner of the 2,000 Guineas Stakes in 1972.

The Superlative Stakes was previously known as the Bernard van Cutsem Stakes in his honor.

== Personal life ==
Bernard van Cutsem married Mary Compton (1919-1989), daughter of Major Edward Robert Francis Compton (1891–1977) and Sylvia Farquharson of Invercauld (1899–1950), on 28 September 1939. They had two sons:

- Hugh van Cutsem (1941–2013); close friend of Charles III.
- Geoffrey Neil van Cutsem (born 1944); married Sally McCorquodale, daughter of Scottish athlete Alastair McCorquodale and sister of Neil McCorquodale, the husband of Lady Sarah Spencer (the elder sister of Diana, Princess of Wales).

They divorced, and in 1948, he married Lady Margaret Fortescue (1923–2013), daughter of Hugh Fortescue, 5th Earl Fortescue (1888–1958) and Hon. Margaret Helen Beaumont (1892–1948). They had two daughters:

- Eleanor van Cutsem (born 1949). married Arthur Gore, 9th Earl of Arran.
- Rosamund Isabelle van Cutsem (born 1952).

In 1966, she left van Cutsem, resumed her maiden name, and they divorced in 1968. Bernard Van Cutsem died on 8 December 1975 at Westminster Hospital. He was 59 years old.
