= Charlier Museum =

Art museum in Brussels, Belgium

- Musée Charlier (French); Charliermuseum (Dutch)
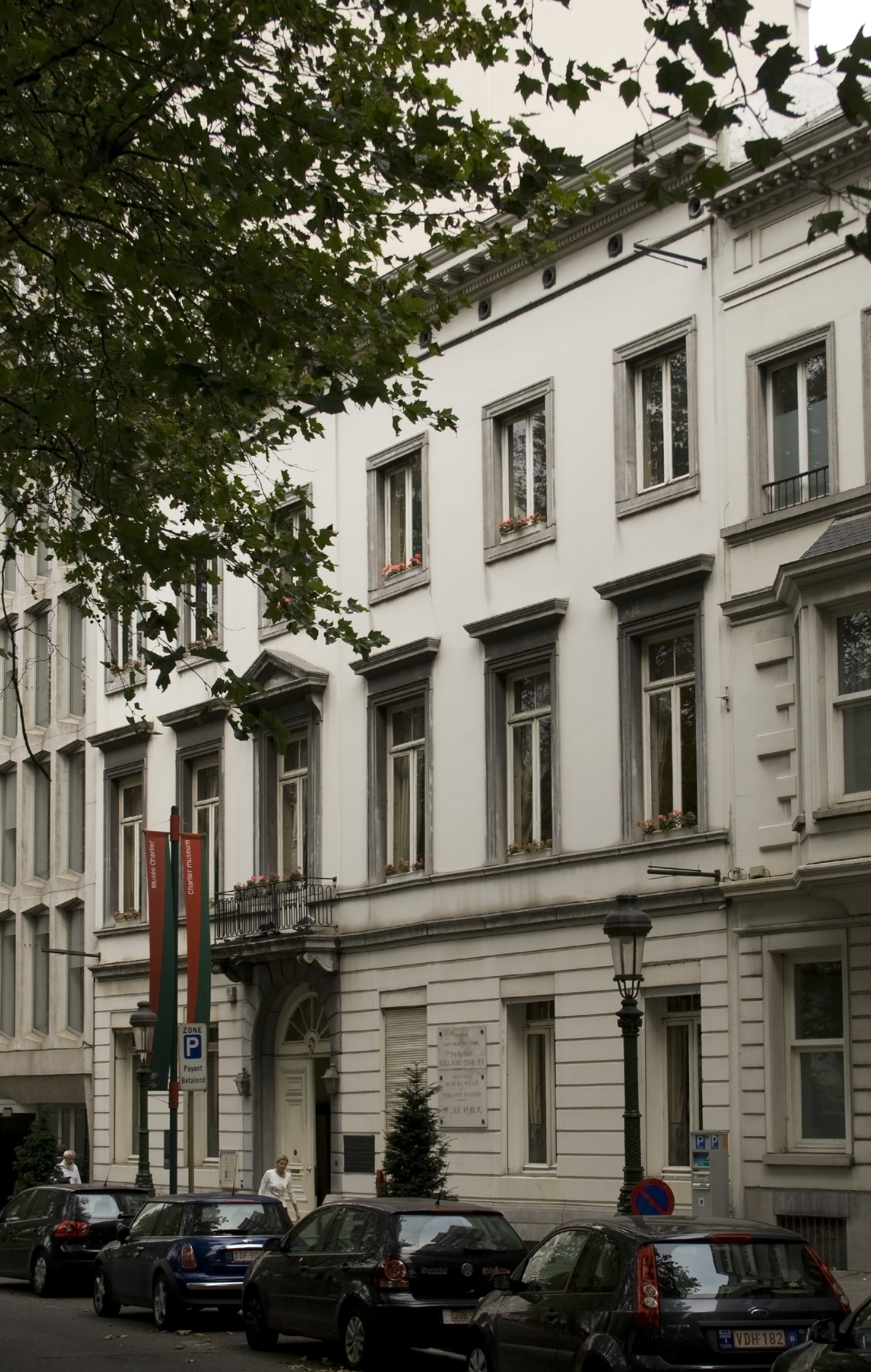
- Exterior of the museum
- Interactive fullscreen map
- Established: 1928; 98 years ago
- Location: Avenue des Arts / Kunstlaan 16, 1210 Saint-Josse-ten-Noode, Brussels-Capital Region, Belgium
- Coordinates: 50°50′51″N 4°22′11″E
- Type: Art museum
- Public transit access: 1 2 5 6 Arts-Loi/Kunst-Wet and 2 6 Madou
- Website: www.charliermuseum.be

The Charlier Museum (French: Musée Charlier; Dutch: Charliermuseum) is a museum in Saint-Josse-ten-Noode, a municipality of Brussels, Belgium, exhibiting Belgian art from the end of the 19th century. It is often used for concerts of classical music.

The museum is located on the Small Ring (Brussels' inner ring road), at 16, avenue des Arts/Kunstlaan.

== History ==
The current museum building was bought by the art collector Henri Van Cutsem in 1890. Van Cutsem hired the architect Victor Horta to remodel and extend the building, notably through the installation of two skylights that illuminate the interior of the ground-floor rooms. The renovation in Art Nouveau style was completed in 1893. In 1904, Van Cutsem died and left the house to the sculptor Guillaume Charlier. When Charlier died in 1925, his will requested that the house and the collection be opened as a public museum. The museum was opened in 1928.

== Collection ==
The museum houses a large number of 19th-century paintings, etchings, and drawings by Belgian artists such as Hippolyte Boulenger, Guillaume Vogels, James Ensor, Anna Boch, Auguste Oleffe, Jacob Smits, Alfred Stevens, Émile Wauters, and Antoine Wiertz. Sculptors are also represented, including Guillaume Charlier, Émile Namur, and Rik Wouters. The rooms are rich in furniture and decorative art objects from the Louis XV, Louis XVI, and Empire periods, as well as tapestries from Brussels, Oudenaarde, and Aubusson, along with carpets, porcelain, and silverware bearing various hallmarks.

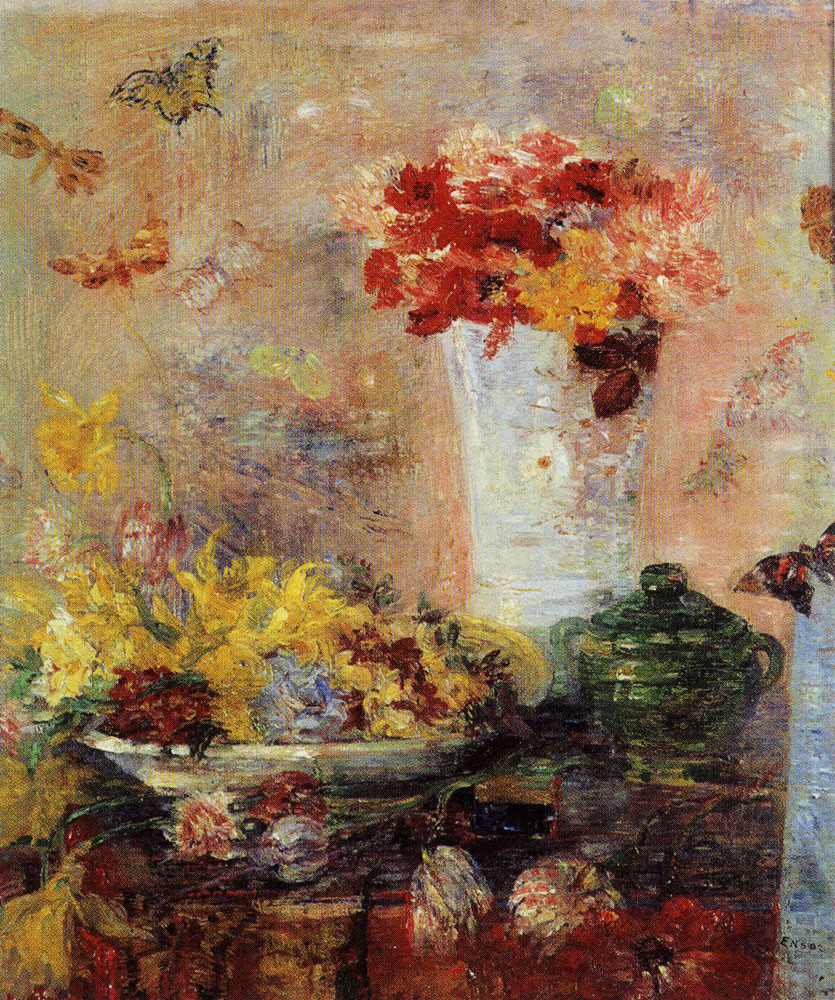
Flowers and Butterflies, James Ensor, 1889

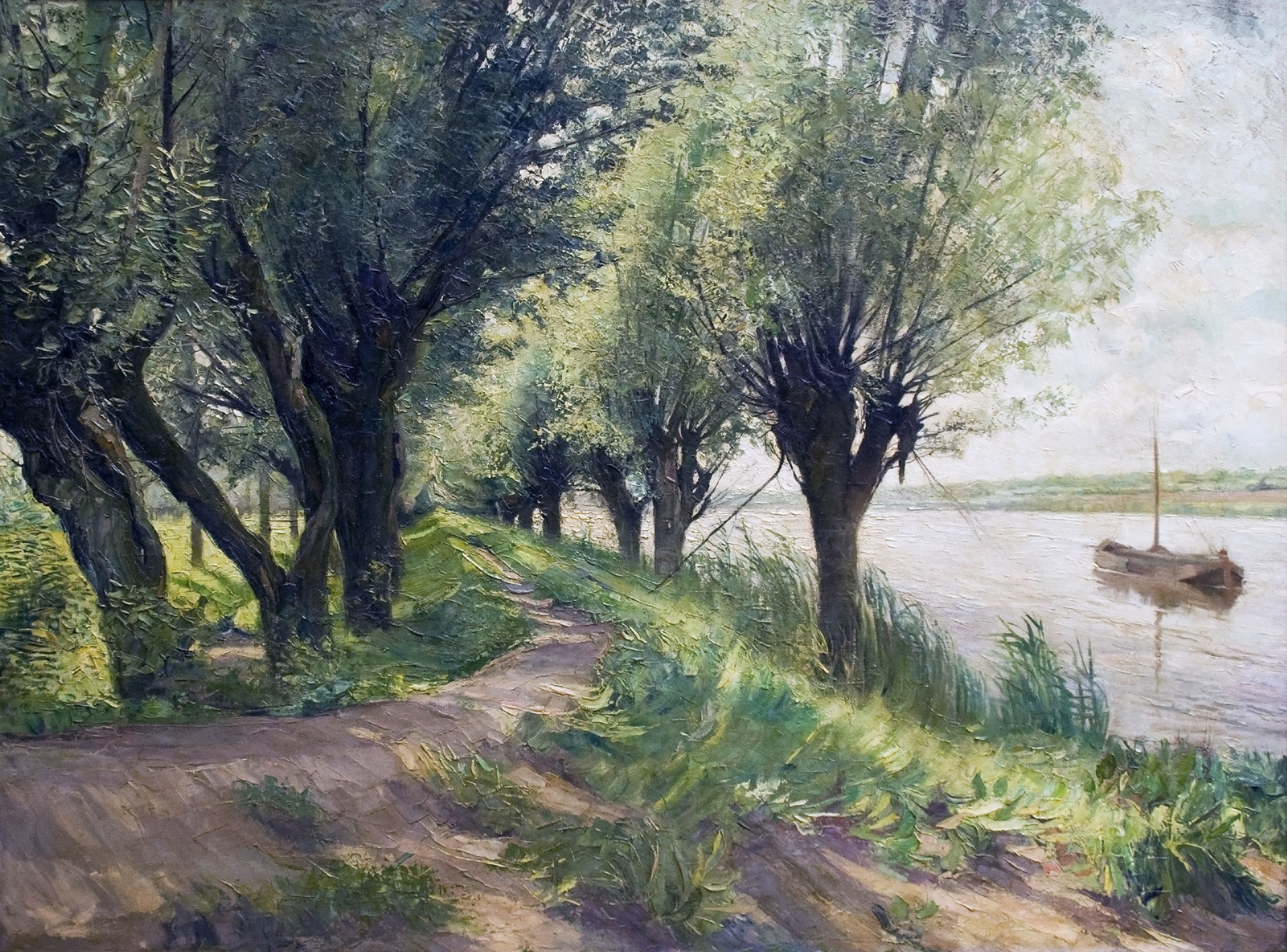
Willows by the Scheldt, Guillaume Van Strydonck, 1890

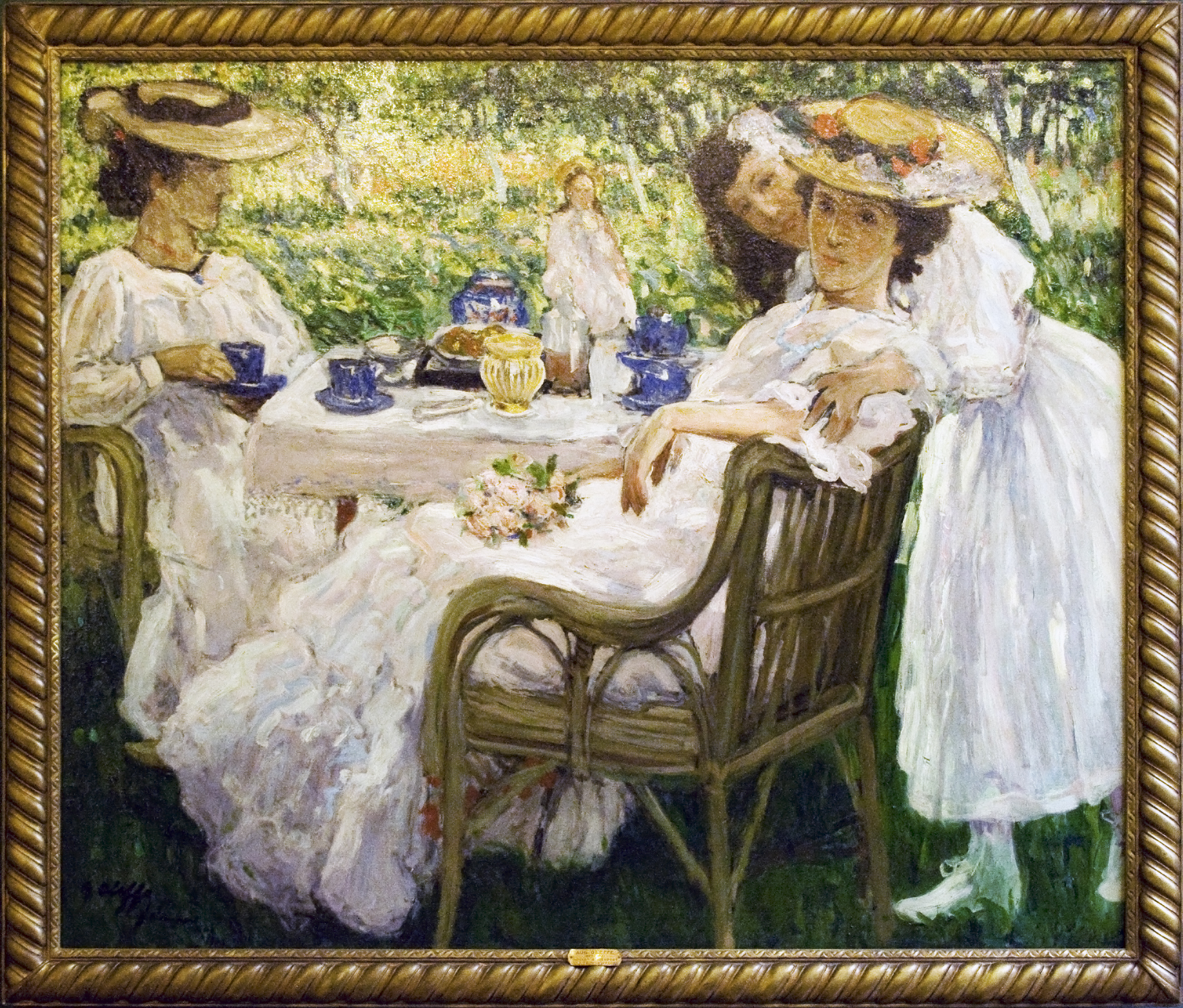
July in Newport, Auguste Oleffe, 1904

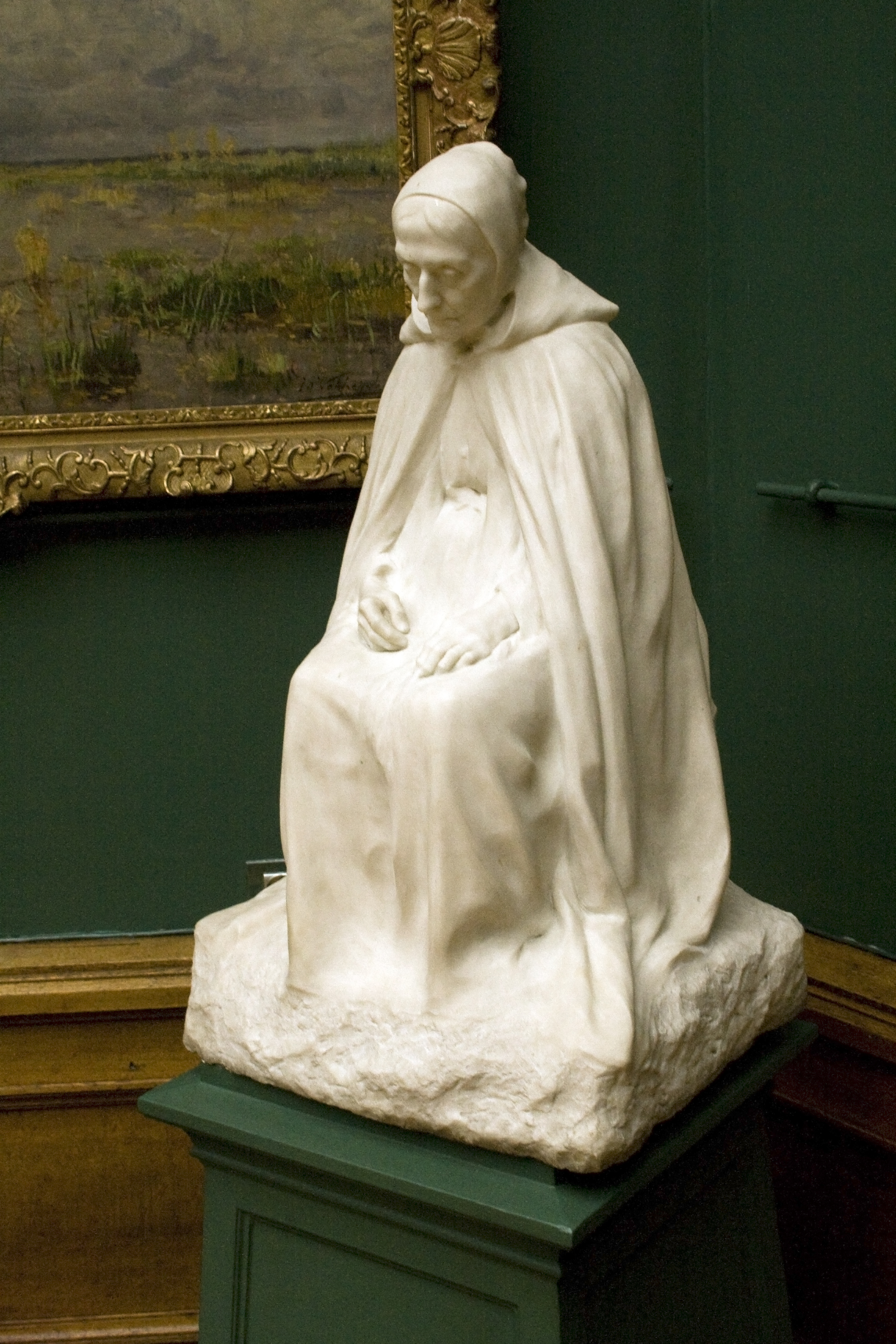
Old Lady, Guillaume Charlier, 1906

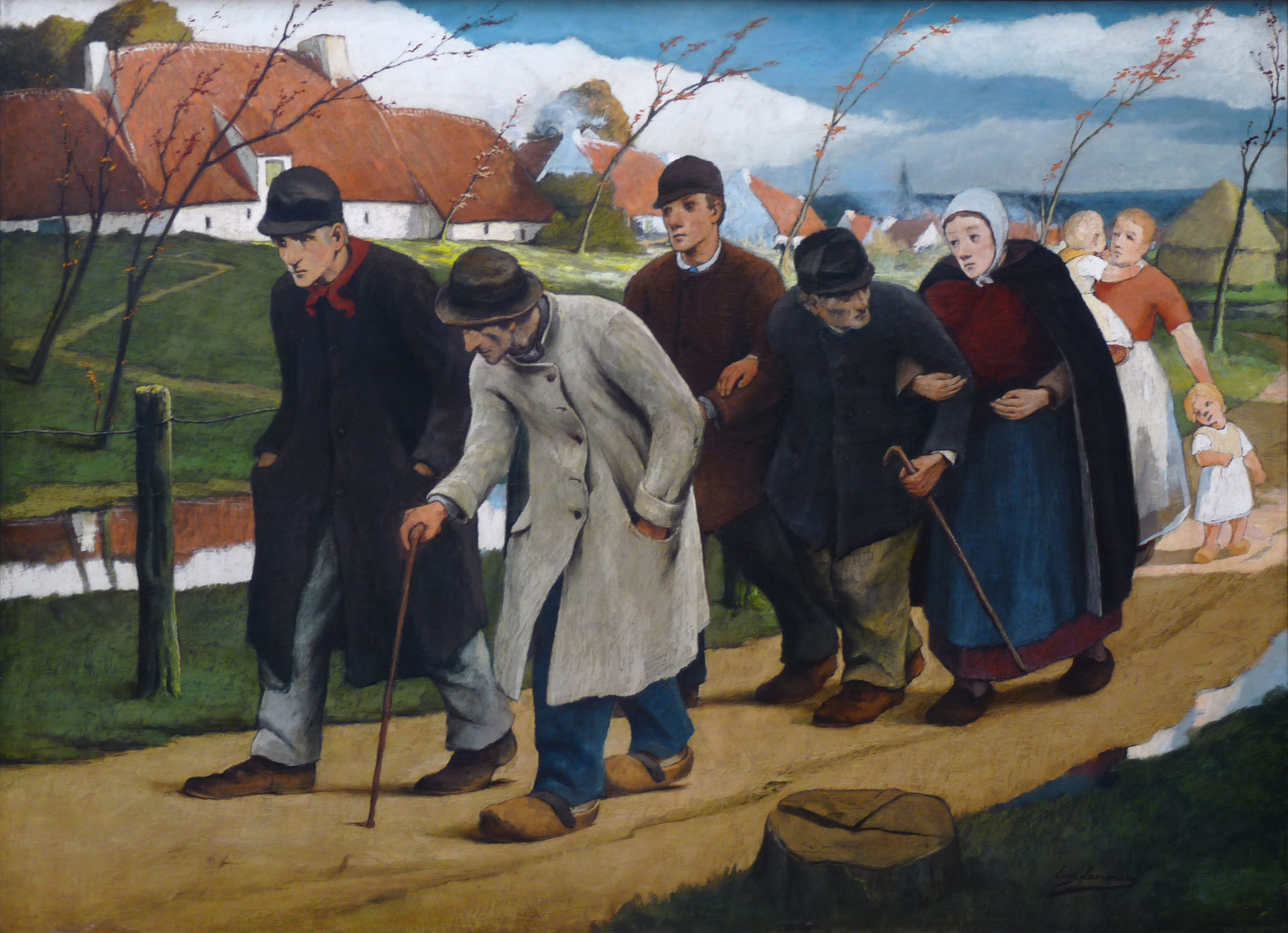
The Walk, Eugène Laermans, 1907

== See also ==
- List of museums in Brussels
- Art Nouveau in Brussels
- History of Brussels
- Culture of Belgium
- Belgium in the long nineteenth century
