= Van Cutsem =

Coat of arms of the Van Cutsem family

The Van Cutsem family is an old and notable family of Dutch origin historically rooted in Flemish Brabant (present-day Belgium) and later established branches in Great Britain. The family belong to the Belgian nobility and are traditionally said to descend from an illegitimate son of Henry II, Duke of Brabant, who was later knighted and given an estate called Cuetssem Velde near Sint-Pieters-Leeuw in Brabant. Over centuries the family acquired considerable land and status in the region, later spreading to England in the 19th century where they became well connected with the British aristocracy and, in the 20th and 21st centuries, with the British royal family.

== Notable members ==
- Bernard van Cutsem (1916–75), English racehorse breeder and trainer
- Henri Van Cutsem (1839–1904), Belgian patron of the arts
- Hugh van Cutsem (1941–2013), English banker, landowner and horse breeder
- Louis Van Cutsem (1909–1992), Belgian sculptor
- Margaret van Cutsem, otherwise Lady Margaret Fortescue (1923–2013), English landowner and huntswoman
- William van Cutsem, known as William Vance (1935–2018), Belgian comics artist
- Edward van Cutsem (b. 1973), godson of King Charles III and a page boy at his wedding to Lady Diana Spencer
- Nicholas van Cutsem (b. 1977), godfather of Prince Louis of Wales
- William van Cutsem (b. 1979), godfather of Prince George of Wales
- Grace van Cutsem (b. 2007), goddaughter of the Prince of Wales and a bridesmaid at his wedding to Catherine Middleton
- Florence van Cutsem (b. 2014), goddaughter of the Duke of Sussex and a bridesmaid at his wedding to Meghan Markle
