= Joseph Stevens (painter) =

Belgian animalier painter and engraver

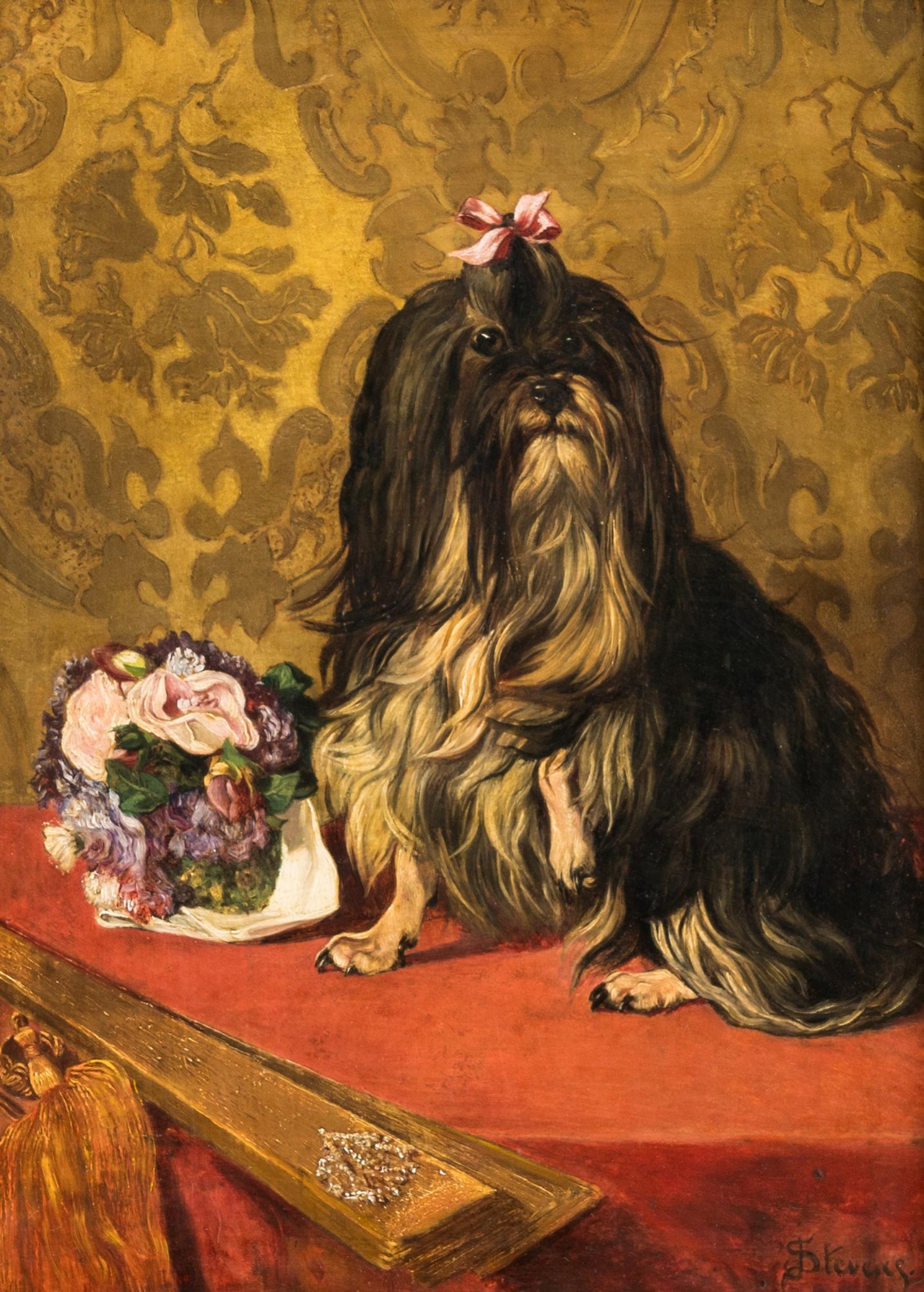
Folette

Joseph Stevens, birth name Edouard Joseph Léopold Stevens (26 November 1816 – 2 August 1892) was a Belgian animalier painter and engraver. He is mainly known for his paintings with dogs as the principal subject. This included dog portraits, dogs interacting among themselves or with their masters and dog markets. From depicting sentimental scenes in a Romanticist manner his art developed towards a more Realist rendering of dogs living on the street or working for travelling entertainers. He won the admiration of the French realist painter Courbet for these efforts. He was a pioneer of Realism in Belgian art. He further painted horses and singeries, scenes with monkeys engaging in human activities. A few marines by his hand are also known.

== Life ==
He was born in Brussels on 26 November 1816 as the son of Jean François Léopold Stevens (1791–1837) and Catherine Victorine Dufoy (1797–1875). His father had originally served in the armies of the French Empire and the Kingdom of the United Netherlands. The Stevens family was well-off and passionate about art. Father Stevens was an art collector, with a particular interest in Théodore Géricault. He wished his sons to embark on an artistic career.

Driver dogs

Joseph's younger brothers also became involved in the art world: Alfred (1823 – 1906) became a prominent painter of scenes with elegant women and Arthur (1825 – 1890) became an art critic and art dealer. Joseph first studied at the college established by the Italian Pietro Gaggia in Brussels. He studied drawing at the Académie Royale des Beaux-Arts of Brussels and followed courses with the animaliers Louis Robbe and Eugène Verboeckhoven. Initially he was more interested in a military career and enjoyed horse riding and physical exercise. Only after marrying on 3 December 1845 in Saint-Josse-ten-Noode the Irishwoman Marie Graham, originally from Cavan in Ireland, did he become more serious about his artistic career.

Largely self-taught, he finished his training in Paris, without enrolling in a school, and frequented the studio of Alexandre-Gabriel Decamps, as well as painters of the Barbizon School and of the "Groupe du Restaurant du Havre" including Thomas Couture, Eugène Isabey, Théodore Rousseau and others. He exhibited at the Brussels Salon from 1842.

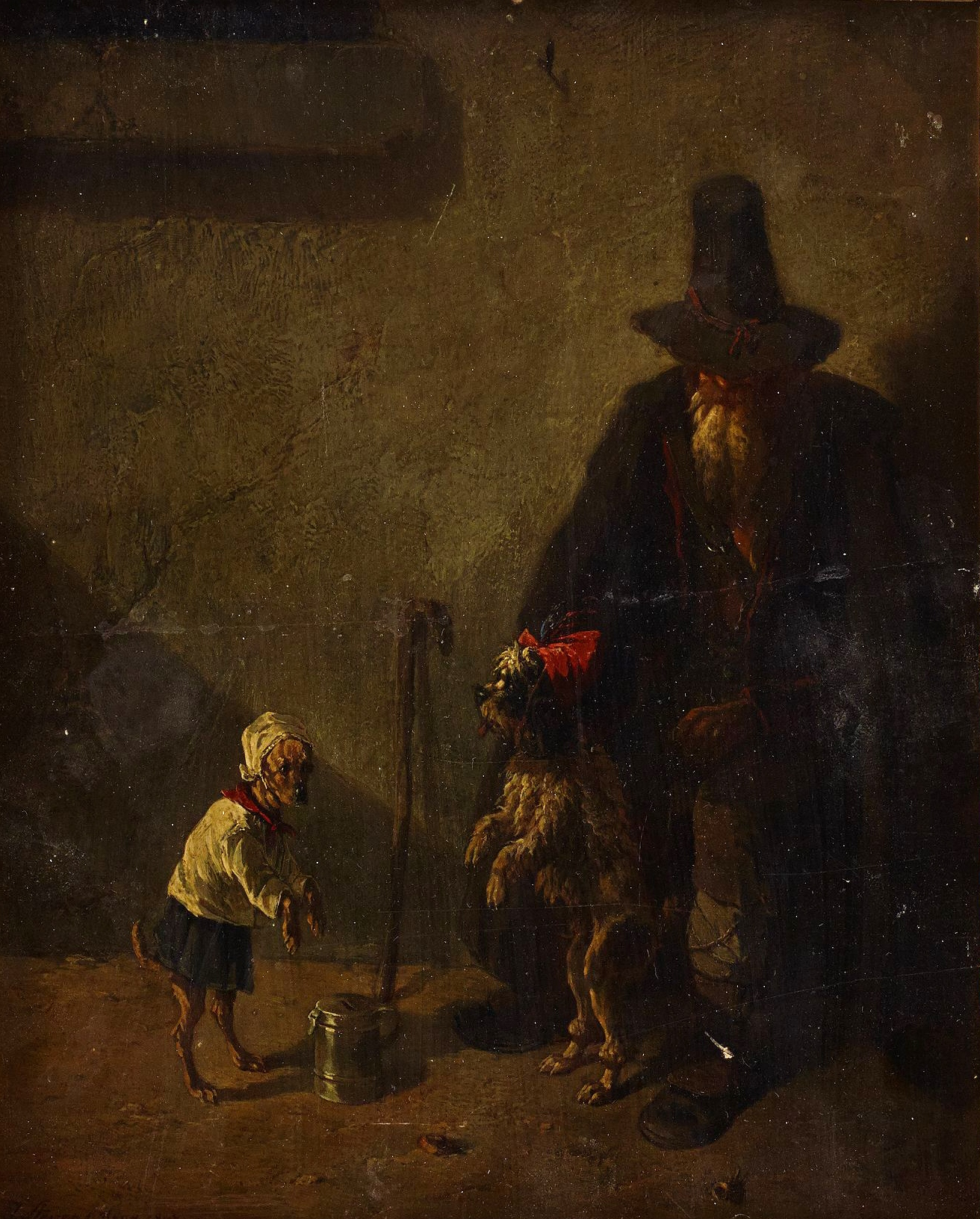
The dog trainer

In 1852 he joined his two brothers in Paris where he lived for several years, dividing his time between the worldliness of the Imperial Court, in particular the Jardin des Tuileries, and the Bohemianism of café life. Reportedly, he rode every morning on horseback in the Bois de Boulogne, where he came into contact with Empress Eugénie, wife of Emperor Napoleon III. When Eugénie later decided to take art classes, Stevens became her tutor. Eugénie became his patroness and thanks to her he was allowed to paint in the saddlery of the Emperor in the Bois de Boulogne. Here he made many drawings of horses which he exhibited in Amsterdam in 1854, and later in Dijon in 1858.

Realist painting, of which he was one of the pioneers, attracted from the 1850s the interest of predominantly French critics and intellectuals. In Paris he became acquainted with Charles Baudelaire, with whom he reconnected again in Brussels in 1864. The poet dedicated to him the piece Les Bons Chiens ("Good Dogs"), the penultimate work, preceding the Épilogue, in the posthumous collection Le Spleen de Paris (Paris Spleen), also known as Petits Poèmes en prose ("Little Poems in Prose"). In the prose poem Baudelaire pays tribute to stray dogs. In paragraph 12 he describes Stevens' L'Intérieur du saltimbanque ("The Room of the Traveling Entertainer"), a painting showing two dogs in a spare room with food stewing on a stove. The French novelist Léon Cladel dedicated to Stevens his Léon Cladel et sa kyrielle de chiens ("Léon Cladel and His Many Dogs", 1885), a collection of memories in which Cladel recalls, one dog after another, his canine companions over his lifetime.

In 1868, he was one of the founding members of the Société Libre des Beaux-Arts in Brussels. It was an artistic circle formed by Belgian artists as a reaction against academicism and to advance Realism in painting as well as artistic freedom. The society was active until 1876, by which time the aesthetic values it espoused had found acceptance at the official Salon. It played a formative role in establishing avant-gardism in Belgium. Stevens finally returned to live in Brussels in 1869.

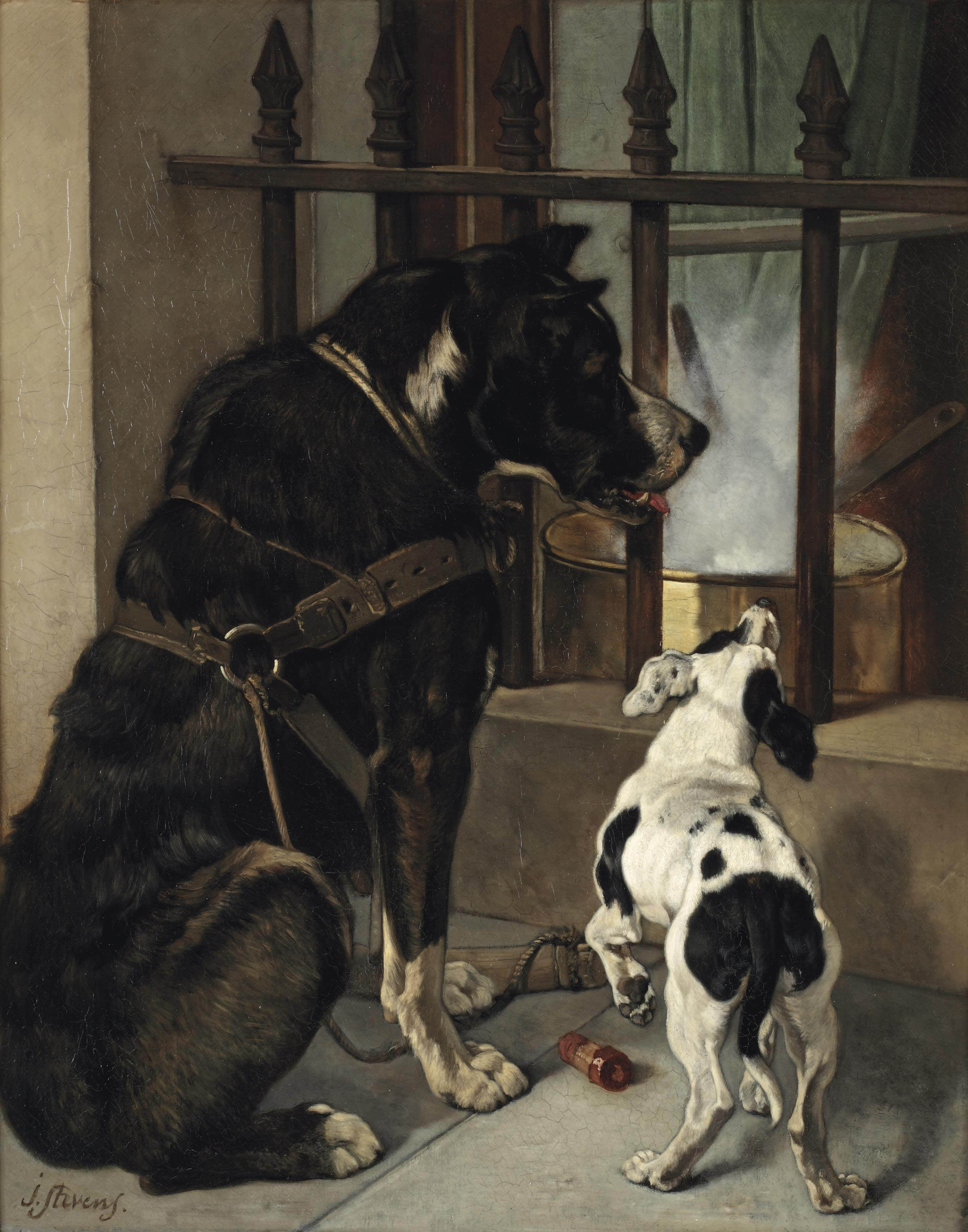
Hungry friends

His work attracted many patrons, notably Henri Van Cutsem. The Belgian King Leopold II also bought paintings of his. He received many distinctions during his career including:

- Medal 2nd class of the Paris Salon of 1852.
- the Medal 2nd class of the Universal Exhibition of Paris of 1855.
- the Medal recall - Paris - 1857.
- the Medal 2nd class of the Paris Salon of 1861.
- Chevalier of the Order of Leopold of Belgium in 1861.
- Chevalier of the Imperial Order of the Légion d'Honneur in 1861.
- Officer of the Order of Leopold of Belgium in 1866.
- the Medal of the Universal Exhibition of Vienna in 1873.
- the Medal of Honor at the London Salon in 1875.

Despite (or perhaps because of) his success, he fell prey to alcoholism in his later years and was no longer able to paint. He died on 2 August 1892 in Ixelles and was buried in Zaventem.

The French painter Ernest Meissonier painted his portrait.

== Works ==
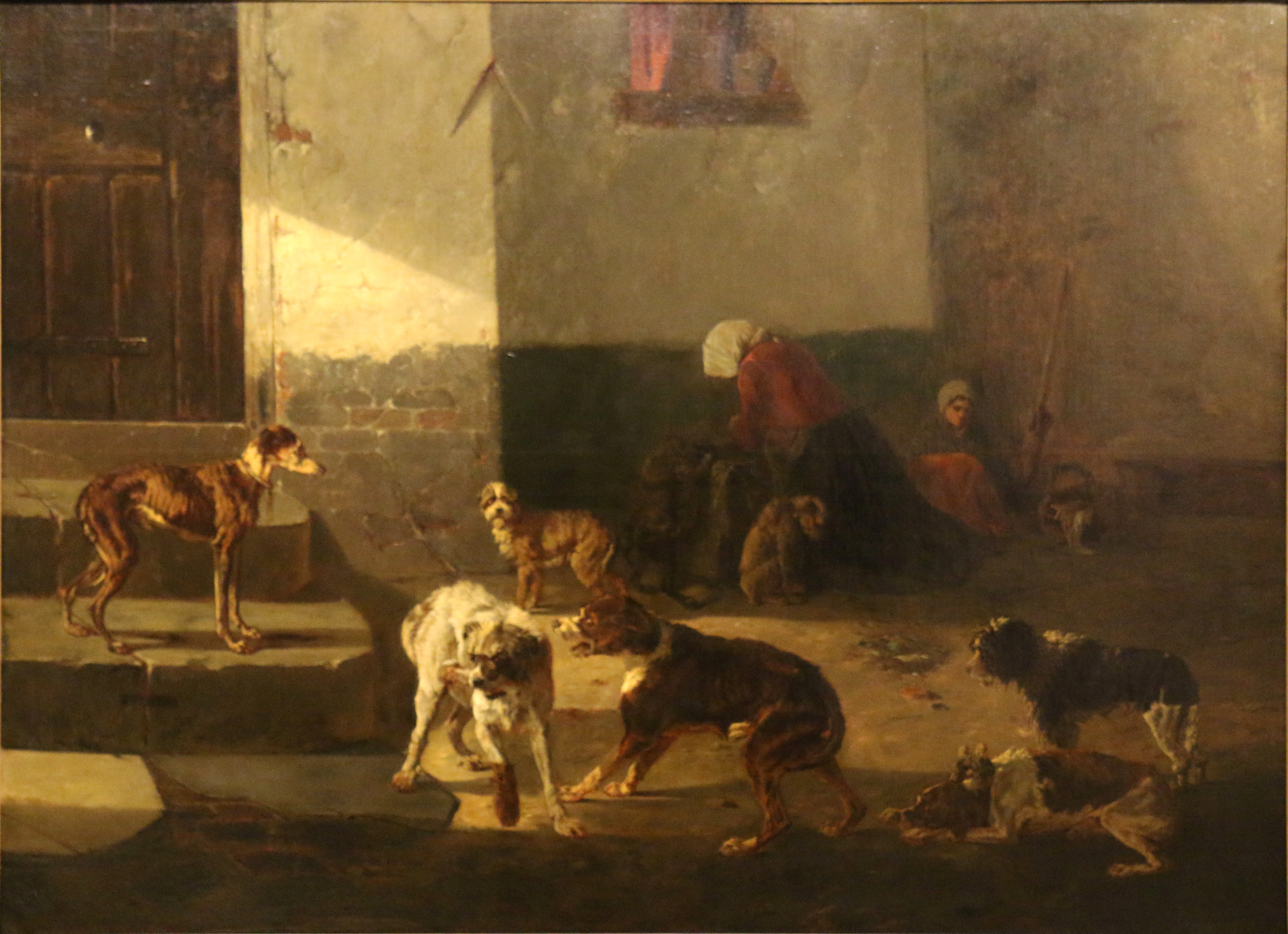
Morning in Brussels

Stevens is known for his paintings with domestic animals, mainly dogs, monkeys and horses. Dogs were his principal subject. He made dog portraits and created scenes of dogs interacting among themselves, with other animals or with their masters and dog markets. He further painted singeries, scenes with monkeys engaging in human activities. A few marines by his hand are also known.

He initially depicted dogs in sentimental scenes with a Romanticist flavour. His art developed towards a more Realist rendering of dogs living on the street or working for travelling entertainers. A similar turn towards Realism could be witnessed in other Belgian painters, such as his brother Alfred, Charles de Groux and Gustave Léonard de Jonghe. A breakthrough piece was his 1848 painting entitled Morning in Brussels. It showed stray dogs searching for food in the gutters and garbage dumps. In the background, barely visible, are two silhouettes of women, probably two beggars, who clearly share a fate similar to that of the dogs.

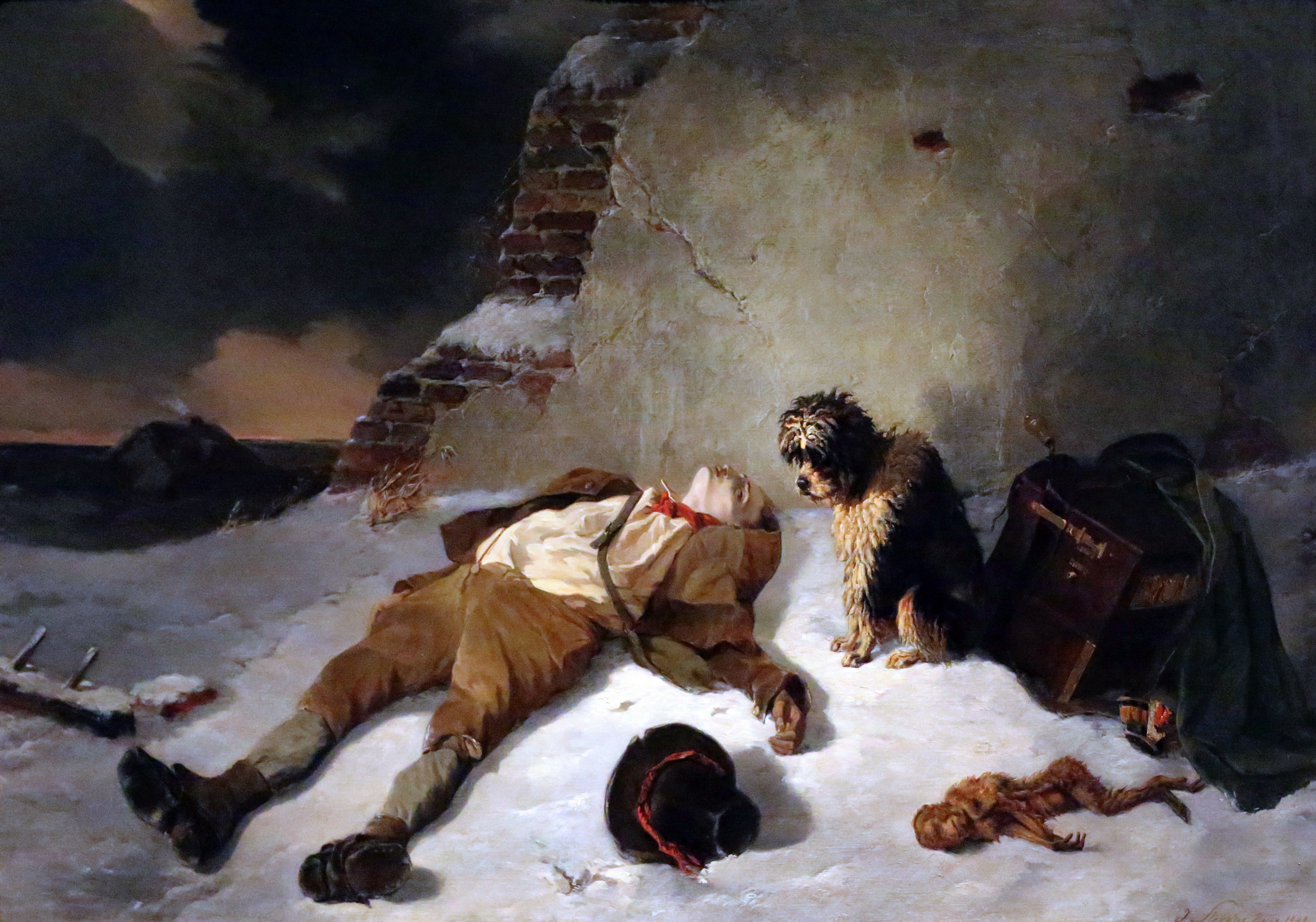
Alone in the world

With this work he was a pioneer of Realism in Belgian art. This new style was in line with experiments already underway in France. Stevens continued creating metaphorical scenes in which usually dogs, sometimes a few horses or a monkey, evoke the plight of the wretched. These works can be seen as a half-hearted attempt at creating social realist art without the conviction to fully commit to the cause of the downtrodden. His palette, which was dominated by browns and blacks broken by a few flashes of light, gives a muted atmosphere to the realist scenes. It was only in the work of Constantin Meunier that the social realist intention in Belgian painting came fully into its own. Stevens could not free himself of his initial bourgeois sentimentalism as is evident in his 1848 painting Alone in the world (Royal Museums of Fine Arts of Belgium).

== Museum holdings ==
- Royal Museum of Fine Arts Antwerp
- Royal Museums of Fine Arts of Belgium (RMFAB)
- Belfius Art Collection
- Museum of Fine Arts, Ghent
- Musée des beaux-arts de Marseille: At the door
- Musée d'Orsay: The punishment of Tantalus
- Mu.ZEE (Kunstmuseum aan zee), Ostend
- Musée des beaux-arts de Rouen: A dog's job

== Gallery ==
Selected works

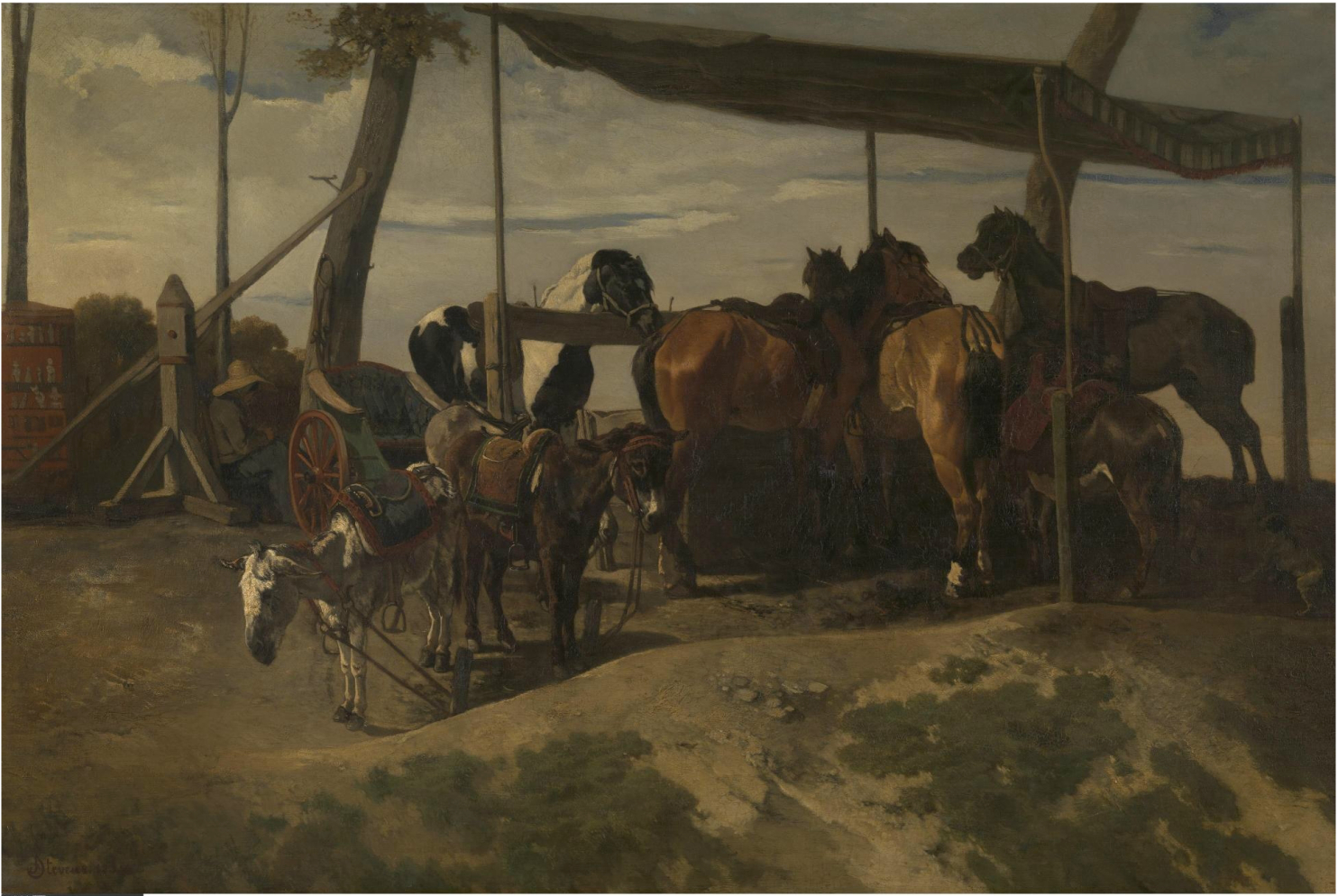
Rental of horses and donkeys (Museum of Fine Arts Ghent)

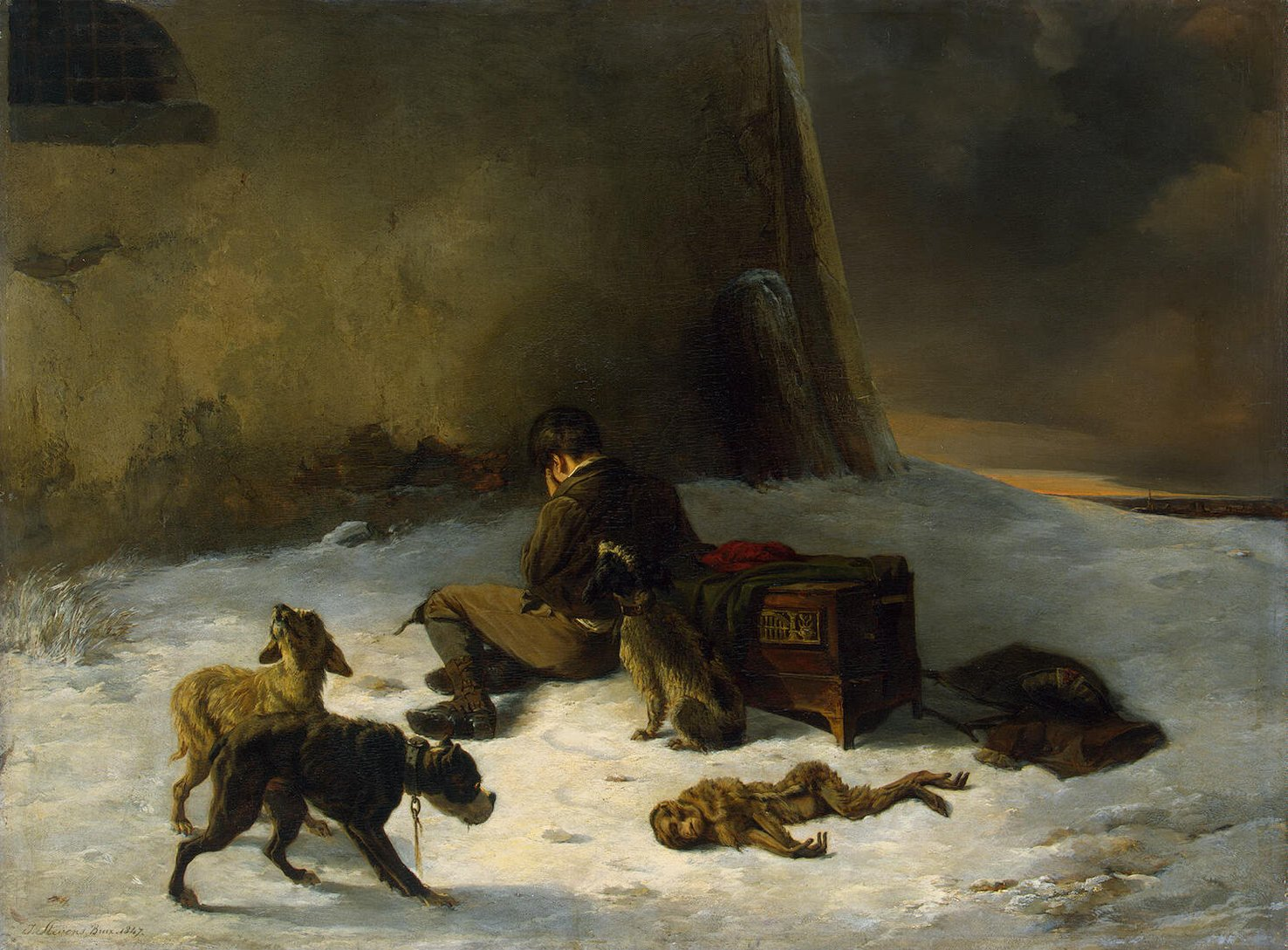
Misfortune of a travelling actor (Hermitage)

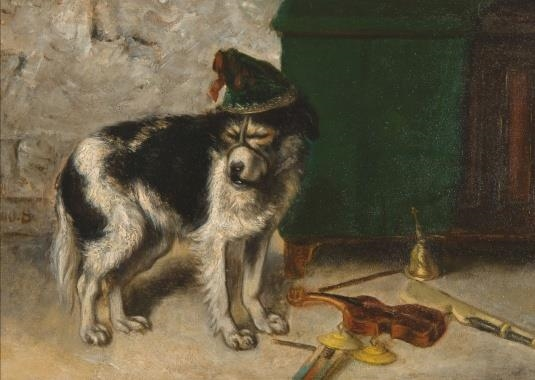
Dog of a travelling entertainer

Undertaker

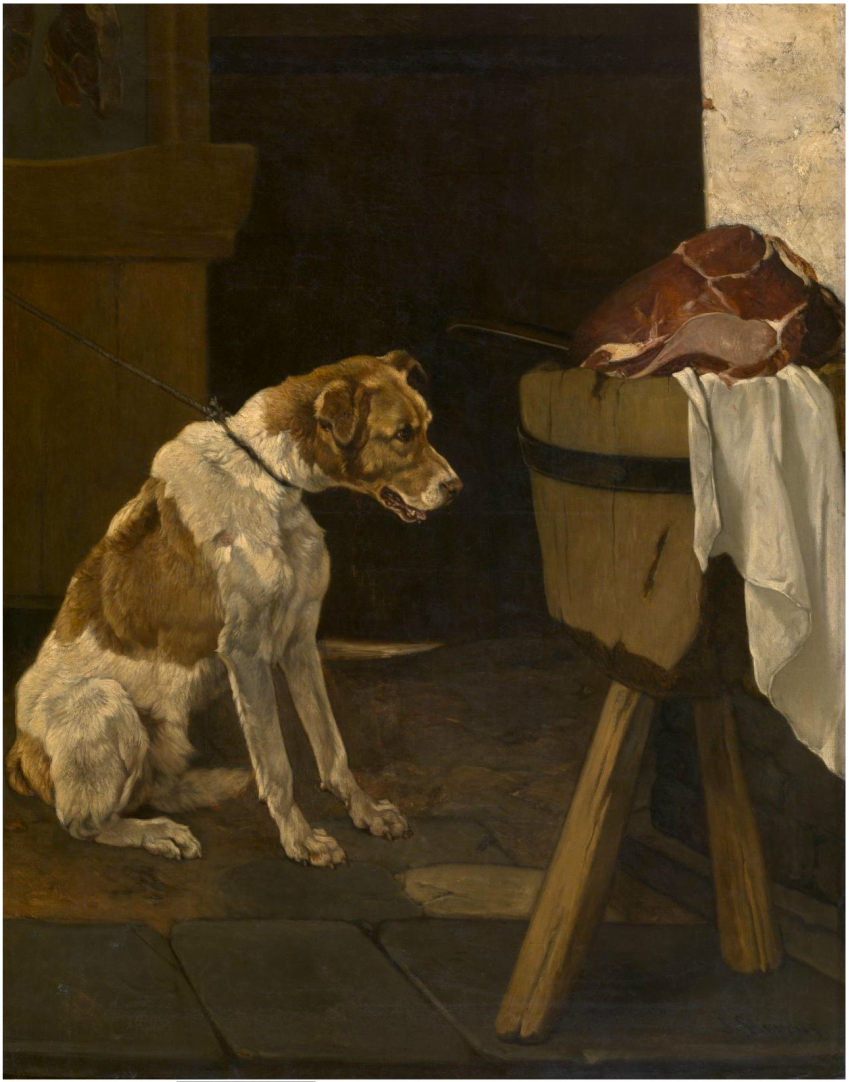
Punishment of Tantalus (KMSKA)

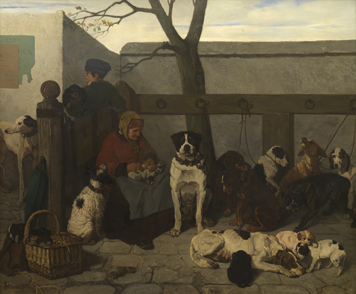
The Dog Market in Paris (RMFAB)

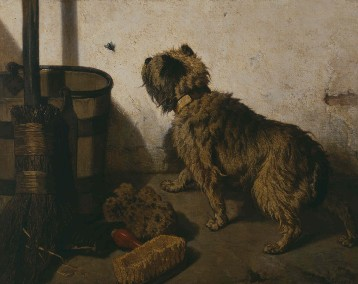
The Dog and the Fly (RMFAB)

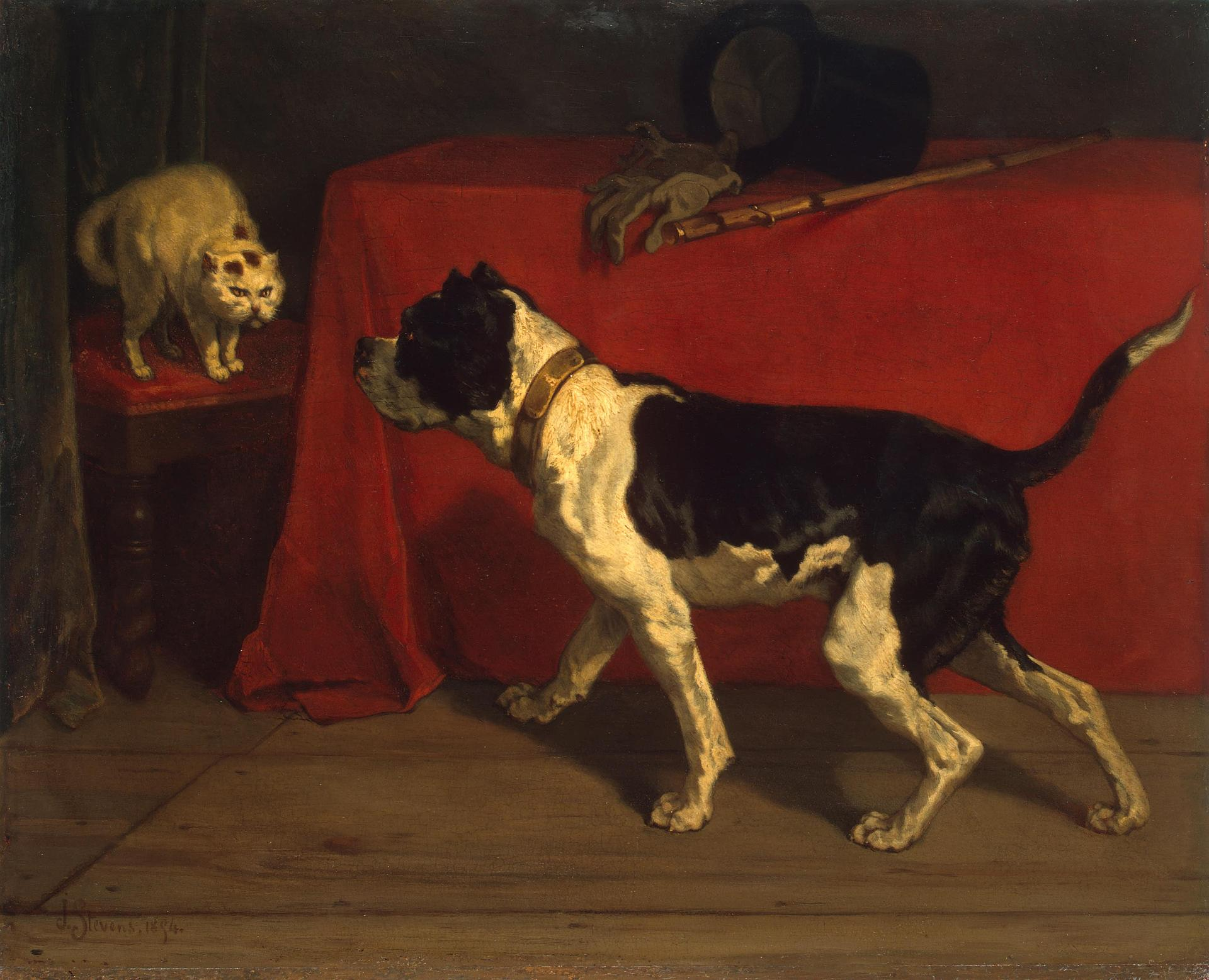
Enemies (Hermitage)

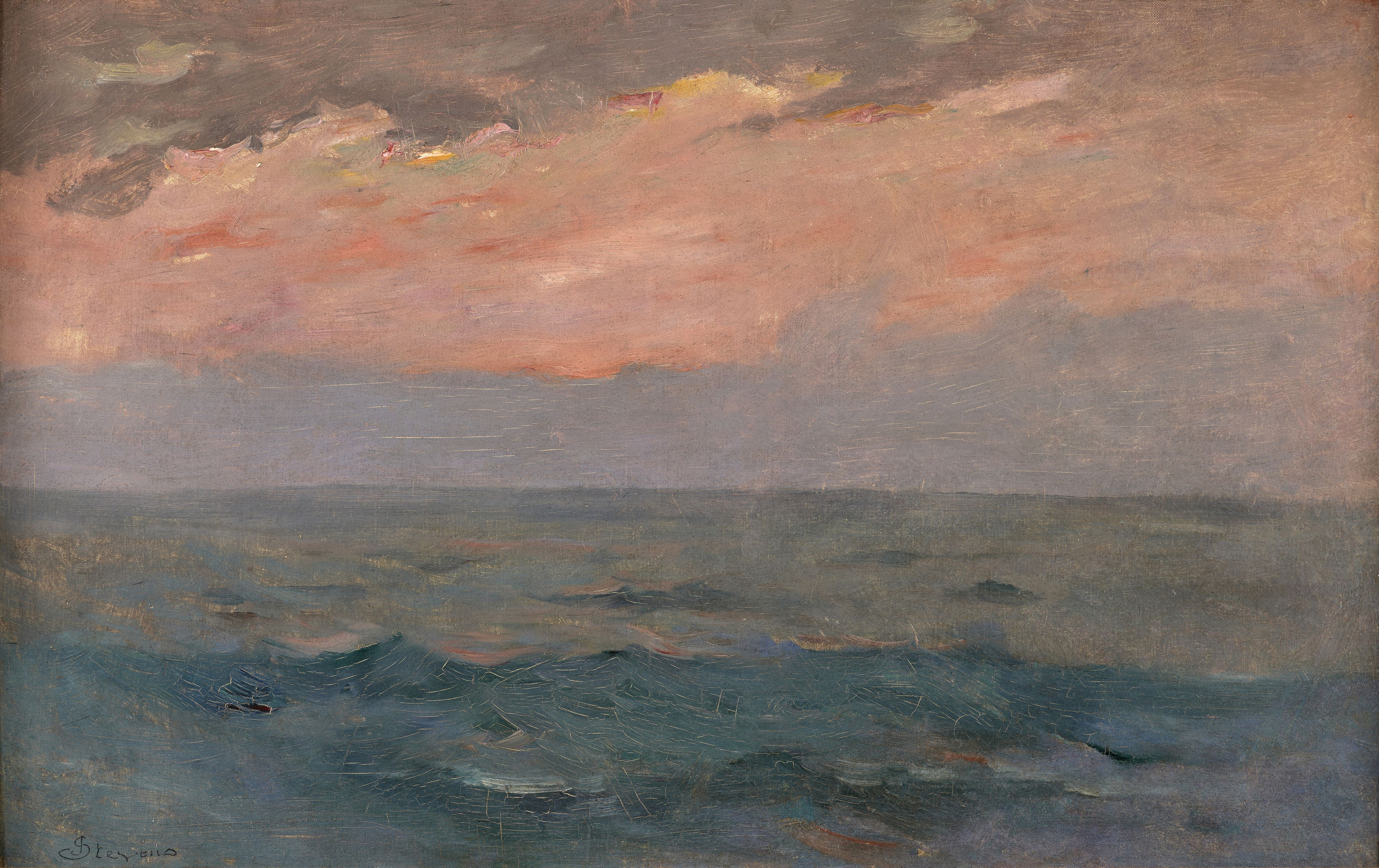
Rough seas under glowing skies
