= P. van Heerdt tot Eversberg-Quarles van Ufford =

Dutch feminist and artist

- Born: 5 December 1862; Ketandan, Dutch East Indies
- Died: 2 December 1939 (aged 76); The Hague, The Netherlands
- Spouse: Victor van Heerdt tot Eversberg (m. 1884)

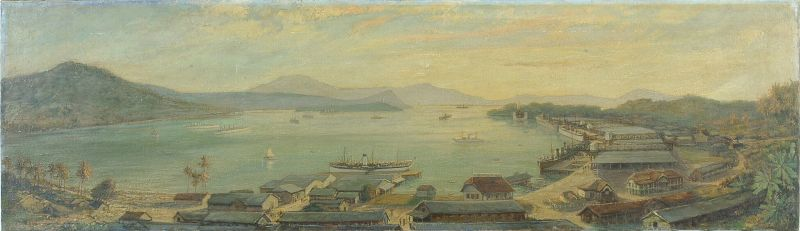
Oil painting by "Ph. van Heerdt tot Eversberg-Quarles van Ufford" now in the collection of Amsterdam's Tropenmuseum. It shows the harbor of Sabang, in Sumatra.

Countess Anne Philippine Madeleine van Heerdt tot Eversberg-Quarles van Ufford (5 December 1862 – 2 December 1939) was a Dutch feminist, artist, and peace activist. She was involved, among other things, as a board member of the Dutch Association for Women's Suffrage and as acting president of the World Union of Women for International Peace.

== Personal life ==
Philippine was the daughter of Hendrik Quarles van Ufford and Anne Madeleine Scheltema. She was born on 5 December 1862 on the family's indigo plantation in the village of Ketandan, in what is now Indonesia but was then the Dutch East Indies. When Philippine was six years old, her father died. Anne Madeleine then moved back to Europe with her four children, of whom Philippine was the eldest. The family stayed briefly in the Netherlands, then moved to Switzerland, where Philippine obtained a "multilingual education" and a certificate of primary education.

In 1879, the family returned to the Netherlands, where Philippine studied at the Royal Academy of Art, The Hague. According to the Netherlands Institute for Art History, her art teachers included Fridolin Becker (1830-1895) and Margaretha Roosenboom (1843-1896).

Philippine's brothers introduced her to Count (Graaf) Victor van Heerdt tot Eversberg, whom she married in 1884. That same year, the couple moved to Suriname to manage a coffee plantation. A year later their only son was born. When it was clear that they could not make the coffee plantation profitable, her husband accepted a position as adjutant to the Governor-General of the Dutch East Indies in Batavia. In 1901, the family returned from Batavia to The Hague, where Philippine again started painting and became a member of the Pulchri Studio.

== Women's suffrage ==
In the Netherlands, together with her mother-in-law Emilie van Heerdt tot Eversberg-van Lansberge, Philippine became involved in the women's movement. Emilie had been involved in the Nationale Tentoonstelling van Vrouwenarbeid 1898 (National Exhibition of Women's Labor 1898.) This exhibition promoting the importance of women's labour was organized by feminists to honor the 1898 inauguration of Netherlands Queen Wilhelmina. Several works painted by Philippine were included in the exhibition, which attracted more than 90,000 visitors.

Philippine herself became an engaged member of the Nederlandsche Bond voor Vrouwenkiesrecht (Dutch Association for Women's Suffrage), which was founded in 1907. She was president of the Bloemendaal department and was on the board of the social education committee. She also regularly wrote articles for De Ploeger, the magazine of the association. For example, in 1910 De Ploeger published a piece by her entitled "Wat wij vrouwen door het kiesrecht hopen te bereiken" ("What we hope to achieve by women's suffrage"), in which she argues that women's suffrage will positively influence society in many ways. She also emphasized, like many members of the Association, the importance of educating girls and women as responsible voters. In "Eene eeretaak. Open brief aan alle Nederlandse meisjes en vrouwen" ("A glorious task. Open letter to all Dutch girls and women") (1910) she wrote about the "duties" that come with the "right" to vote. Philippine managed the literature list compiled by the Association to inform and educate women into thoughtful voters.

Encouraged by the success of their 1898 exhibition of women's labour, Dutch feminists organized a second exhibition to show women's progress during a century since the origin of the Dutch monarchy in 1813. The feminist exhibition De Vrouw 1813-1913 (The Woman 1813-1913) attracted more than 300,000 visitors. Its visual arts display included artworks by Philippine.

== Peace movement ==
After the women's suffrage was acquired (1919), Philippine became all the more concerned with the importance of education. She always emphasized that it is important to make women at home in the themes that they will have to deal with as voters. World peace was for Philippine, like many first-wave feminists, a central theme. Philippine also emphasized that women had to be well-educated in order to be able to fulfill their role as educator of the next, hopefully peace-loving, generation. In this capacity, Philippine was involved, among others, in the Vereeniging voor Volkerenbond en Vrede (Society for the League of Nations and Peace.) For example, in 1919 she published "Volkerenbond, vooruitgang en opvoeding" ("League of Nations, progress and education") in which her interests in women's suffrage and world peace come together. Philippine, who spoke fluent French, also became honorary vice president of the Union mondiale de la femme pour la concorde internationale (World Union of Women for International Peace). After Clara Guthrie d'Arcis died in 1937, Philippine became acting president.

She died in The Hague on 2 December 1939 at the age of 76.
