= Louis Van Cutsem =

Belgian sculptor

- Born: May 1909
- Died: April 1992 (aged 82); Evere, Belgium
- Occupation: Sculptor

Louis Van Cutsem (May 1909 – April 1992) was a Belgian sculptor, member of the Van Cutsem family. His work was part of the sculpture event in the art competition at the 1936 Summer Olympics.
