= Musée des Beaux-Arts, Tournai =

Art museum in Tournai, Belgium

Coordinates: 50°36′10″N 3°23′8″E

Musée Des Beaux-Arts De Tournai
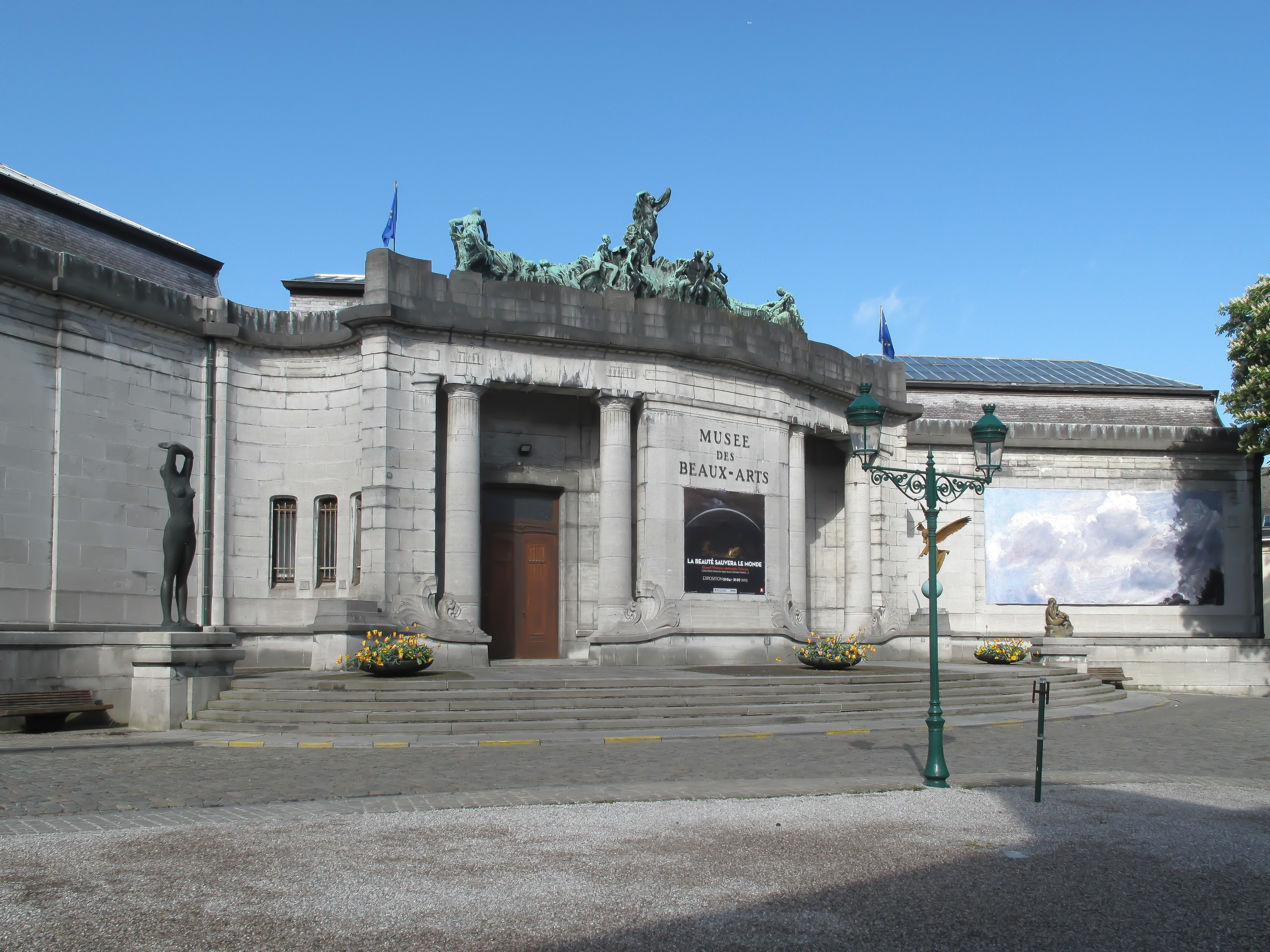

- Location within Belgium
- Location: Tournai, Belgium
- Type: Art museum
- Website: mba.tournai.be

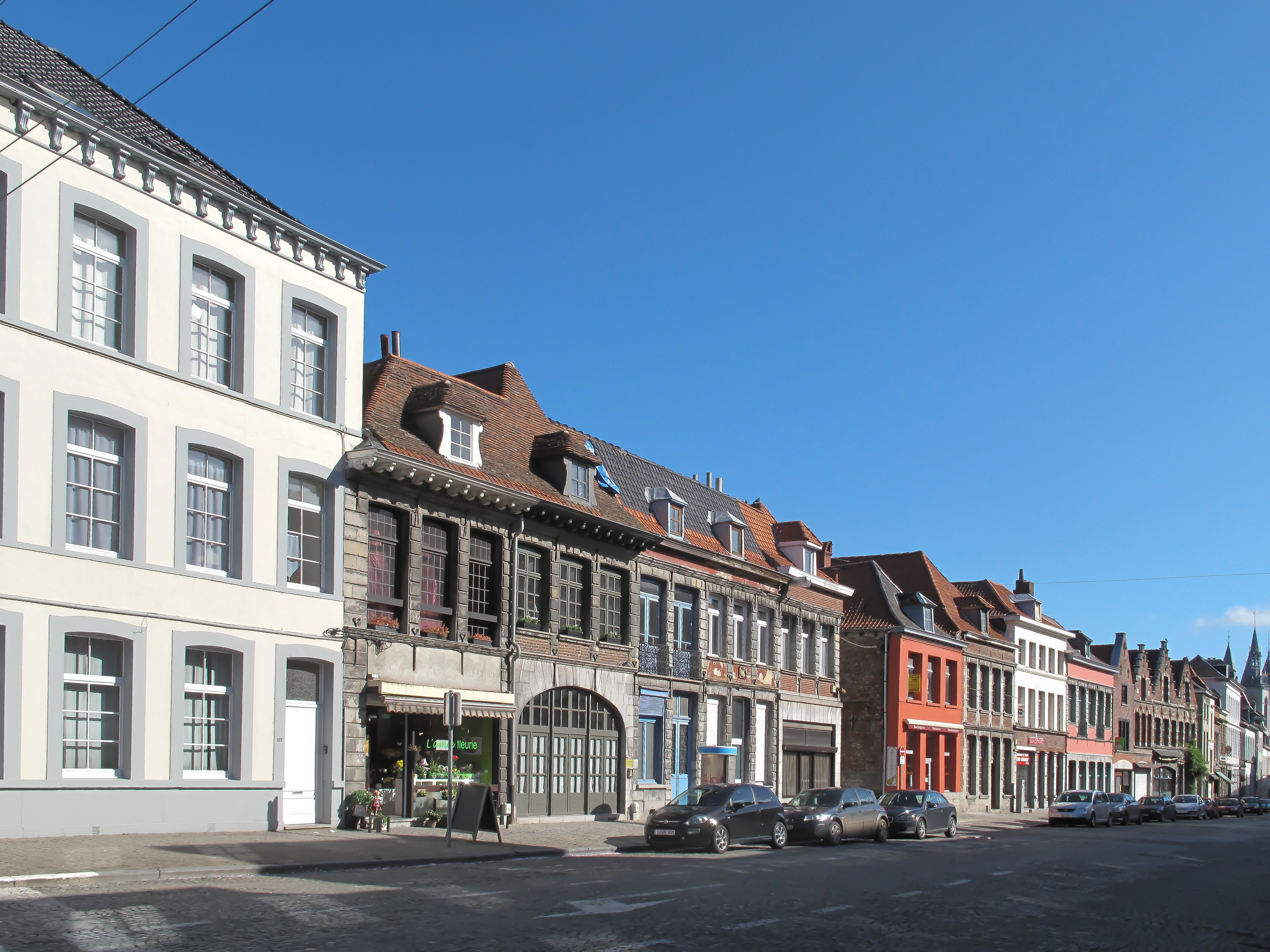
View to a street: rue Saint Martin

The Musée des Beaux-Arts in Tournai, Belgium, is an art museum.

At the beginning of the 20th century, Henri Van Cutsem, a Belgian art collector, offered his collection of art to the city of Tournai in 1905. The collection contained important works by important 19th century French painters like Manet, Monet, Seurat and others.

The Belgian Art Nouveau architect Victor Horta started drafting a new building that would contain the Van Cutsem donation and other holdings already owned by the city of Tournai but the First World War intervened and construction was delayed. Horta abandoned his first designs made in a typical Art Nouveau style, shifting to the popular art deco style. The building, which opened in 1928, is a graceful curved version of the usually strict linearity of art deco, in this, it is similar to Horta's Brussels Central Station.

== See also ==
- Palais des Beaux-Arts / Paleis voor Schone Kunsten in Brussels
