= Eugène Broerman =

Belgian painter (1861–1932)

- Born: Eugène Broerman; 12 June 1861; Belgium
- Died: 7 October 1932 (aged 71) n/a
- Education: Académie Royale des Beaux-Arts
- Occupation: Painter

Eugène Broerman (12 July 1861 – 7 October 1932) was a Belgian painter.

== Life ==
Broerman trained at the Académie Royale des Beaux-Arts in Brussels. His house, Antoine Delporteplein 2, Saint-Gilles, has been a protected historical monument since 1997.

== Honours ==
- Member of the Royal Academy of Science, Letters and Fine Arts of Belgium.
- 1932: Commander of the Order of Leopold.

== Works by Broerman ==
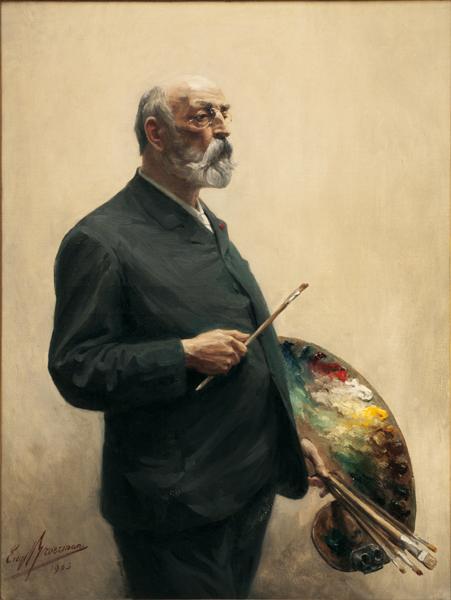
Portrait of André Hennebicq

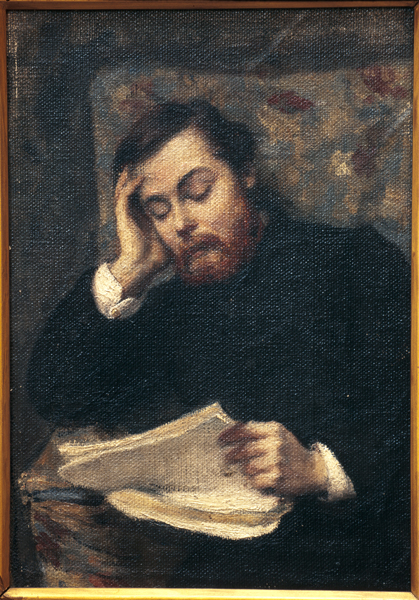
Portrait of Guillaume Charlier

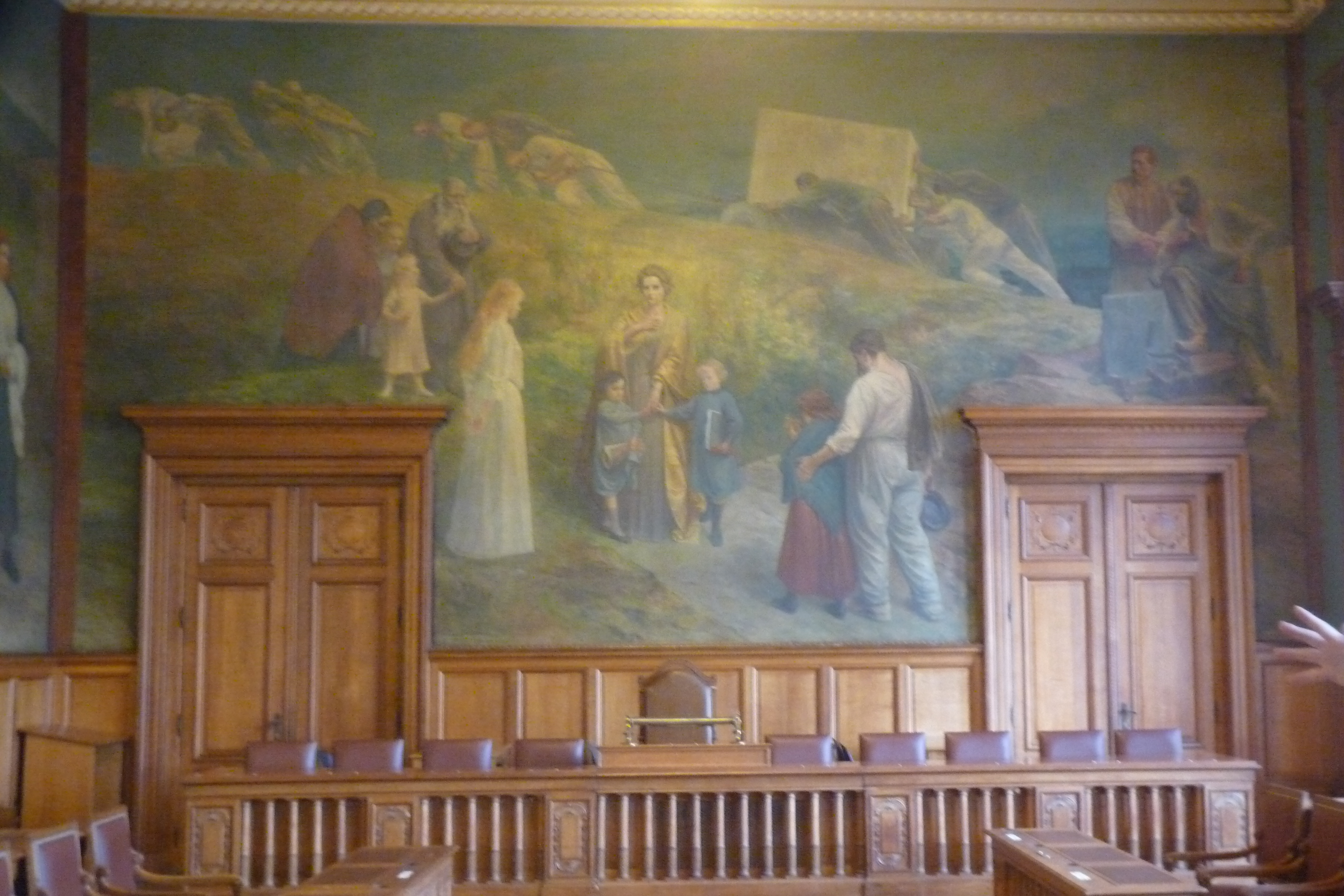
Mural in Council Chamber, Saint-Gilles, Belgium

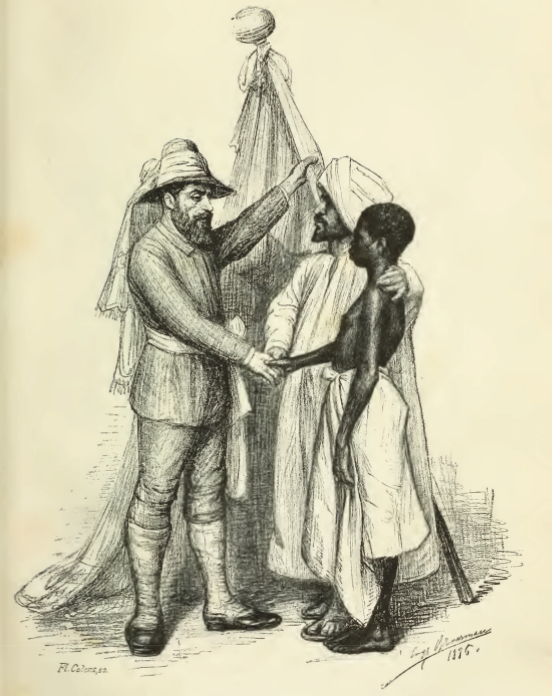
The Union of the Three Races
