= Bryan Edward Quarles van Ufford =

Dutch diplomat

Bryan Edward Quarles van Ufford (27 May 1920, Semarang, Dutch East Indies — 21 September 1975 Leiden) was a diplomat from the Netherlands. As of 1972, he was Dutch ambassador to Luxembourg. Later he served as the leader of the Dutch delegation to the Mutual and Balanced Force Reductions (MBFR) exploratory talks in Vienna in early 1973.
