= Fortescue (surname) =

Fortescue is an English surname that originated from the old Norman epithet Fort-Escu ("strong shield"). People with the surname include:

- Adrian Fortescue (1874–1923), English Catholic priest and polymath
- Adrian Fortescue (martyr) (c. 1476–1539), English nobleman and martyr beatified by the Catholic Church
- Anthony Fortescue (1535–1608), English conspirator
- Charles Granville Fortescue (1861–1951), British Army officer
- Charles LeGeyt Fortescue (1876–1936), Canadian electrical engineer
- Chichester Fortescue (disambiguation)
- Denzil Fortescue, 6th Earl Fortescue (1893–1977)
- Dudley Fortescue (1820–1909), British politician
- Dudley Fortescue (MP for Sudbury) (died 1604), English politician
- Eleanor Fortescue-Brickdale (1872–1945), English artist
- Edmund Fortescue (disambiguation)
- Francis Fortescue (c. 1563–1624), English politician
- Grace Fortescue (1883–1979), New York socialite who killed a defendant charged with the rape of her daughter
- George Fortescue (c. 1578–1659), English essayist and poet
- Harriet Angelina Fortescue (1825–1889), British writer on international affairs
- Henry Fortescue (Lord Chief Justice) of Ireland
- Henry Fortescue (MP, died 1576)
- Hugh Fortescue (disambiguation)
- John Fortescue (disambiguation)
- Lady Margaret Fortescue (1923-2013), one of the UK's largest private landowners
- Michael Fortescue, linguist specializing in Arctic and native North American languages
- Nicholas Fortescue the Elder (1575?–1633), English Chamberlain of the Exchequer
- Nicholas Fortescue the Younger (1605?–1644), knight of St John
- Richard Fortescue (disambiguation)
- Rosie Fortescue, a participant in the first season of the British structured-reality television series Made in Chelsea
- Tim Fortescue (1916–2008), British politician
- Thomas Fortescue (disambiguation)
- William Fortescue (disambiguation)
- Winifred Fortescue (1888–1951), British actress and writer

== Fictional characters ==
- Florean Fortescue, in Harry Potter
- J. Fortescue, a nonexistent doctor created as a hoax, supposedly a founder of the International Board of Hygiene

== See also ==
- Camilla Fortescue-Cholmondeley-Browne, a character on the BBC series Call the Midwife
- Sir Daniel Fortesque, a character in MediEvil
