= Nicholas Fortescue =

Nicholas Fortescue may refer to:

- Nicholas Fortescue the Elder (1575?–1633), chamberlain of the exchequer
- Nicholas Fortescue the Younger (1605?–1644), knight of St John
