= Fortescue =

Fortescue may refer to:

== People ==
- Fortescue (surname), a list of people with the name
- Fortescue Ash (1882–1956), Anglican bishop in Australia
- Fortescue Cuming (1762–1828), Irish-born traveler and author
- Fortescue Graham (1794–1880), British Royal Marines general

== Places ==
- Fortescue, Missouri, United States, a village
- Fortescue, New Jersey, United States
- County of Fortescue, Queensland, Australia
- Fortescue Bay, Tasmania, Australia
- Fortescue River, Western Australia

== Titles ==
- Earl Fortescue, a title in the Peerage of Great Britain
- Fortescue baronets
- Baron Fortescue of Credan, an extinct title in the Peerage of Ireland

== Other uses ==
- Fortescue (company), an Australian mining and energy company, previously known as Fortescue Metals Group
  - Fortescue railway line, railway line operated by the company
- Fortescue National Football League, an Australian rules football league
- Fortescue (novel), an 1846 novel by Irish writer James Sheridan Knowles
- Fortescue, protagonist of The House of Fortescue, a 1916 silent film
- Fortescue grunter (Leiopotherapon aheneus), a freshwater fish
- Centropogon australis or Fortescue, a venomous fish common to Eastern Australia
