= George Fortescue =

English essayist and poet

George Fortescue (c.1578–1659) was an English essayist and poet.

== Life ==
Fortescue, born in London in or about 1578, was the only son of John Fortescue, by Ellen, daughter of Ralph Henslow of Barrald, Kent. His father was the second son of Sir Anthony Fortescue (third son of Adrian), by Katharine, daughter of Sir Geoffrey Pole. His father resided for many years in London, but in his old age he retired to St. Omer to avoid persecution as a Catholic. George probably received part of his education in the English College of Douay, was in October 1609 admitted as a boarder in the English College at Rome, and was recalled by his parents to Flanders 30 April 1614. He was in London secretary to his cousin Anthony Fortescue, the resident for the Duke of Lorraine at the time of his dismissal by the Houses of Parliament in 1647. He was arrested, and, after an imprisonment of sixteen weeks, was ordered to quit the kingdom with his principal. His reputation for learning was so great that Edmund Bolton placed his name in the original list of the members of the projected royal academy, or senate of honour. Among his correspondents were Galileo Galilei, Cardinal Francesco Barberini, nephew of Urban VIII, Famiano Strada, the historian of the Spanish wars in Flanders, Thomas Farnaby, the critic and grammarian, and Gregorio Panzani, who was sent by Urban VIII on a mission to the English Catholics.

He died in 1659, his will being dated on 17 July in that year.

== Works ==
- His principal work is entitled 'Feriæ Academicæ, auctore Georgio de Forti Scuto Nobili Anglo,’, a volume of Latin essays
- 'The Sovles Pilgrimage to heavenly Hierusalem. In three severall Dayes Journeyes: by three severall Wayes: purgative, illuminative, unitive. Expressed in the Life and Death of Saint Mary Magdalen,’ 1650, 4to
