= The Difference between an Absolute and Limited Monarchy =

15th-century English pamphlet

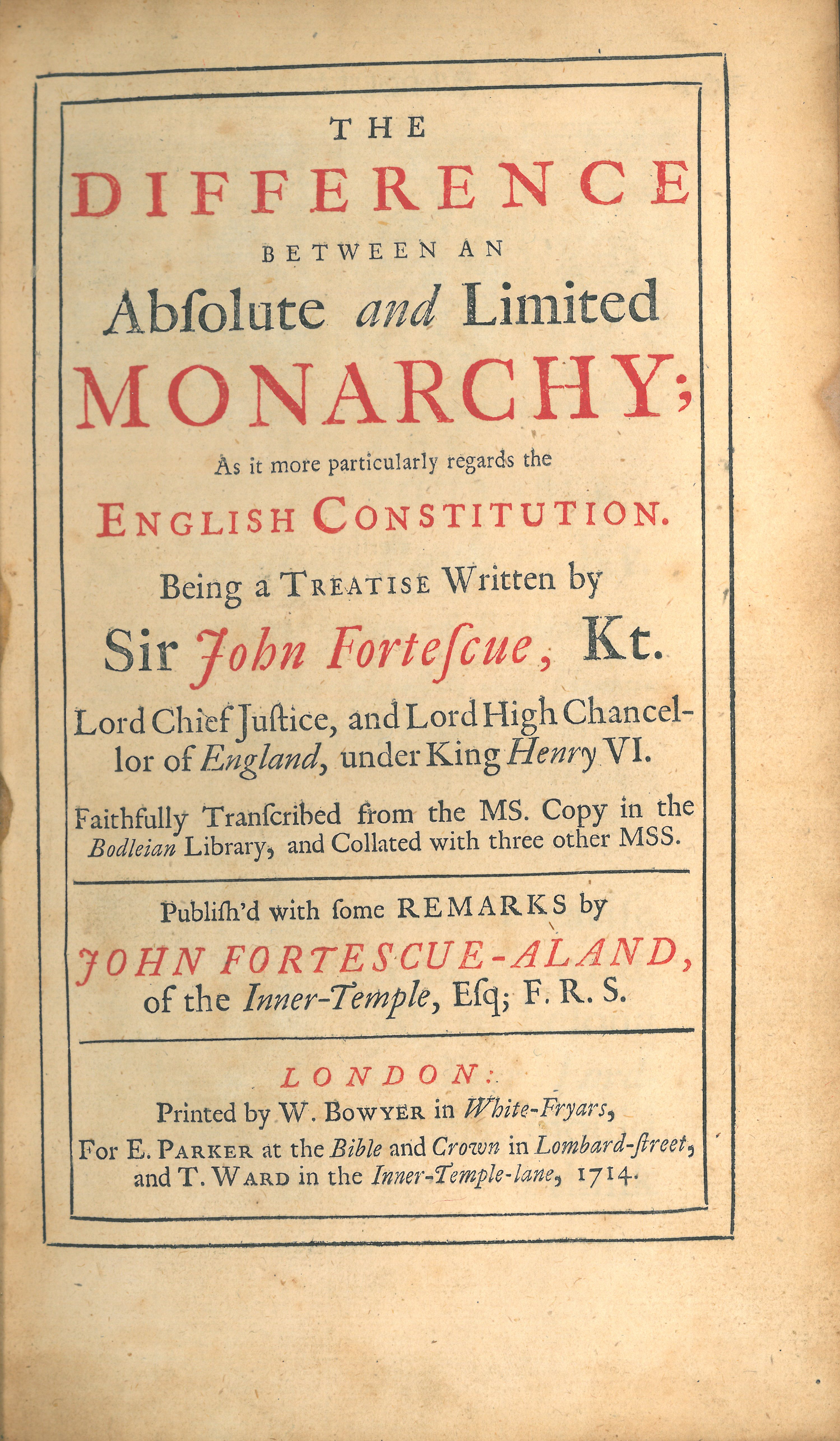
- Title page of the first printed edition (1714)
- Author: Sir John Fortescue
- Original title: The Governance of England
- Language: English
- Subject: Political philosophy, constitutional law
- Genre: Political treatise
- Published: 1714
- Publisher: John Fortescue Aland
- Publication place: Kingdom of England
- Media type: Print (manuscript; later book)

The Difference between an Absolute and Limited Monarchy or The Governance of England is a political treatise attributed to Sir John Fortescue (c. 1394–c. 1479), an English judge and Lord Chief Justice of the King's Bench, in which he offers a comparative analysis of forms of kingship.

== Background ==
Fortescue was Chief Justice of the King's Bench until Henry VI was deposed in 1461 during the Wars of the Roses. Fortescue joined Henry in exile where he wrote the manuscript and was also tutor to Henry's son Edward.

== Contents ==
The manuscript was written in English around 1471 provide the first discussion of the political and conceptual underpinnings of the common law, besides commenting on England's constitutional framework. In the Cotton library there is a manuscript of this work, and its title indicates that it was addressed to Henry VI. However, many passages show plainly that it was written in favour of Edward IV.

Written within the tradition of late medieval constitutional thought, the work distinguishes between dominium regale (often rendered as an absolute monarchy) and dominium politicum et regale (a limited monarchy), arguing that royal authority is best exercised under law and with the consent of the realm. Drawing on English legal practice, Fortescue contends that a limited monarchy more reliably secures justice, the liberties of subjects, and the common good. The treatise is frequently cited for its early articulation of constitutional ideas that later informed English political and legal theory.

== Publication ==
The Difference between an Absolute and Limited Monarchy, based on Fortescue's 1471 manuscript, was published in 1714 by a descendant, John Fortescue Aland.

A revised edition of this work, with a historical and biographical introduction, was published in 1885 by Charles Plummer under the title The Governance of England.

== Sources ==
- Chisholm, Hugh, ed. (1911). "Fortescue, Sir John (lawyer)" . Encyclopædia Britannica (11th ed.). Cambridge University Press.
- Ives, E. W. (22 September 2005). "Fortescue, Sir John". Oxford Dictionary of National Biography (online ed.). Oxford University Press. doi:10.1093/ref:odnb/9944. (Subscription, Wikipedia Library access or UK public library membership required.)
- Sobecki, Sebastian (2015), Unwritten Verities: The Making of England's Vernacular Legal Culture, 1463–1549, Notre Dame, Ind.: University of Notre Dame Press, ISBN 978-0-268-04145-8
- Woodger, L. S. (1993). "FORTESCUE, John (d.1479), of Devon". History of Parliament Online. The History of Parliament Trust.
- McIlwain, Charles Howard (1932), The Growth of Political Thought in the West: From the Greeks to the End of the Middle Ages, New York, N.Y.: Macmillan, p. 359, OCLC 494805
- S. B. Chrimes (1934), "Sir John Fortescue and His Theory of Dominion", Transactions of the Royal Historical Society, 17 (4th series): 117–147, doi:10.2307/3678523, JSTOR 3678523, S2CID 155648025

=== Editions ===
- Aland, John Fortescue, ed. (1714). The Difference between an Absolute and Limited Monarchy: As It More Particularly Regards the English Constitution. Being a Treatise Written by Sir John Fortescue, Kt. Lord Chief Justice, and Lord High Chancellor of England, under King Henry VI. Faithfully Transcribed from the MS. Copy in the Bodleian Library, and Collated with Three Other MSS. Publish'd with Some Remarks by John Fortescue-Aland, of the Inner-Temple, Esq; F.R.S. London: John Fortescue Aland; printed by W. Bowyer in White-Fryars, for E. Parker at the Bible and Crown in Lombard-Street, and T. Ward in the Inner-Temple-Lane. OCLC 642421515.. (According to the ESTC, further editions were issued under this title in 1719 and 1724).
- Plummer, Charles, ed. (1885). The Governance of England, otherwise Called the Difference between an Absolute and a Limited Monarchy. Oxford: Clarendon Press. OCLC 457292673.. Digital versions of text are available online, including at The University of Michigan's Corpus of Middle English and Prose and Verse.
- Fortescue, Thomas, ed. (1869). The Works of Sir John Fortescue, Knight, Chief Justice of England and Lord Chancellor to King Henry the Sixth. London: Printed for private distribution. OCLC 47732533.. [Photo reprints of the original Clermont text are now available, including an edition from The British Library, Historical Print Editions (2011): ISBN 978-1241522131]
- Lockwood, Shelly, ed. (1997). On the Laws and Governance of England. Cambridge: Cambridge University Press. ISBN 0-521-58996-7. - Includes The Governance of England in modern English
