= John Fortescue =

John Fortescue may refer to:

- John Fortescue (Devon lawyer) (died before 1436), English landowner and administrator
- John Fortescue (judge) (c. 1394–1479), English lawyer, judge and Member of Parliament
- John Fortescue of Salden (1531/1533–1607), third Chancellor of the Exchequer of England
- John Fortescue Aland, 1st Baron Fortescue of Credan (1670–1746), English jurist
- John Fortescue (MP for Barnstaple) (1819–1859), British MP
- Sir John Fortescue (historian) (1859–1933), British statesman and military historian

== See also ==
- John Inglett-Fortescue (1758–1840), British Member of Parliament
