= Chichester Fortescue =

Chichester Fortescue may refer to:

- Chichester Fortescue (1718–1757), MP for Trim
- Chichester Fortescue (1750–1820), admiral and MP for Trim, son of the above
- Chichester Fortescue (1777–1826), MP for Hillsborough, nephew of the above
- Chichester Parkinson-Fortescue, 1st Baron Carlingford (1823–1898), Liberal politician, son of the above, known as Chichester Fortescue until 1863

== See also ==
- Fortescue (surname)
