= Thomas Dingley =

English prior

Sir Thomas Dingley (executed 9 or 10 July 1539) was an English prior of the Knights of St. John of Jerusalem. He is venerated as a Roman Catholic martyr, having been declared venerable by Pope Leo XIII in 1886.

== Biography ==
Sir Thomas was the son of John Dingley of Boston, Lincolnshire and his wife, Mabel, daughter of Edmund Weston. He was included in a bill of attainder passed under Henry VIII of England; another person on the same bill was Margaret Pole, Countess of Salisbury. He was accused, together with Robert Granceter, merchant, of "going to several foreign princes and persuading them to make war with the King". He had no trial, and no proof of treasonable practices was ever brought against him. He was found guilty of high treason 28 April 1539, and beheaded on Tower Hill, together with Sir Adrian Fortescue.

There is a discrepancy among the chroniclers as to the date of the execution. Stow gives 10 July, the Gray Friars' "Chronicle" and Wriothesley, 9 July.

The village of Dingli, Malta is probably named after the knight Dingley, who had owned lands in the surrounding area.
