= John Fortescue Aland, 1st Baron Fortescue of Credan =

English judge, politician, and writer

The Right Honourable The Lord Fortescue of Credan FRS
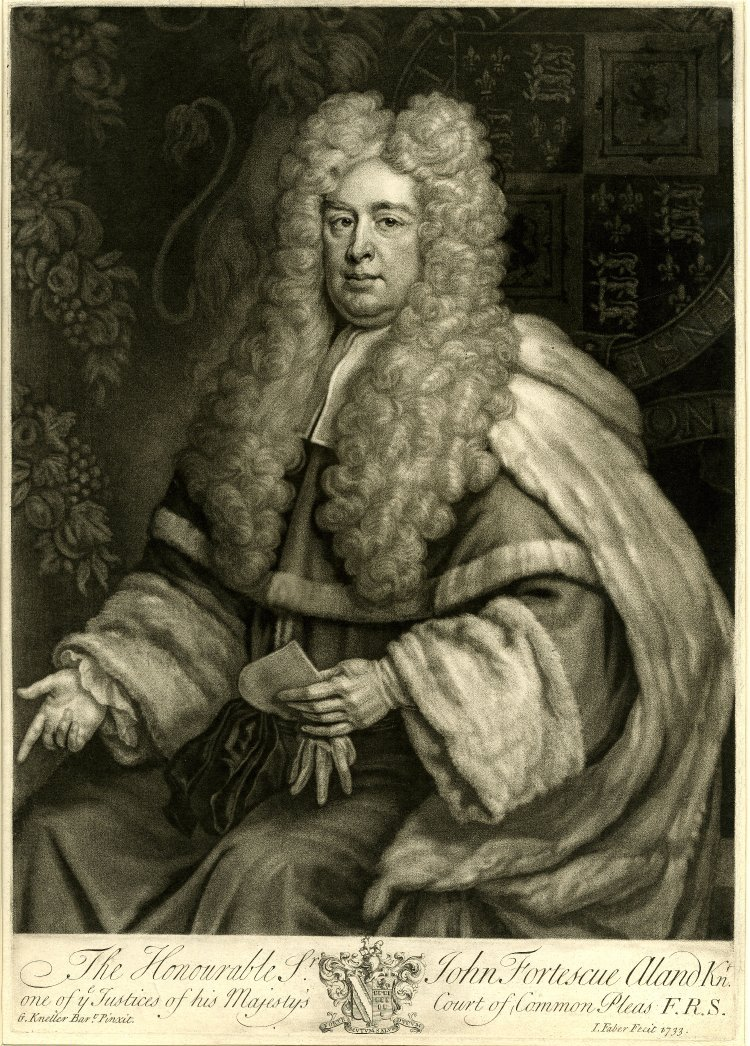

Baron of the Exchequer
- In office 24 January 1717 – 1718
- Preceded by: Sir James Montagu
- Succeeded by: Sir Francis Page

Justice of the Court of King's Bench
- In office 1718 – 10 June 1727

Justice of the Court of Common Pleas
- In office 27 January 1728 – 1746

Personal details
- Born: John Fortescue; 7 March 1670 England
- Died: 19 December 1746 (aged 76) England
- Resting place: Stapleford Abbotts, Essex; 51°38′37.9″N 0°10′4.01″E
- Party: Whig
- Spouse(s): Grace Pratt (m. c. 1707), Elizabeth Dormer (m. 29 December 1721)
- Children: 6

John Fortescue Aland, 1st Baron Fortescue of Credan (7 March 1670 – 19 December 1746) was an English lawyer, judge, politician and peer who sat in the British House of Commons from 1715 to 1717. Aland wrote on English legal and constitutional history, and was said to have influenced Thomas Jefferson. A member of both the Middle Temple and Inner Temple, he became a King's Counsel in 1714 and was then appointed Solicitor General, first to the Prince of Wales and then to his father George I in 1715. After a short stint as a member of parliament, Aland was knighted and elevated to the Bench as a Baron of the Exchequer in 1717. He was subsequently a justice of the Court of King's Bench (1718–1727) and of the Court of Common Pleas (1728–1746), save for a brief hiatus between 1727 and 1728 which has been attributed to George II's displeasure with one of his legal opinions.

In 1714, Aland wrote and published a volume titled The Difference between an Absolute and Limited Government based on a manuscript in the Bodleian Library by his distant ancestor Sir John Fortescue, to which he added an extended preface. This was possibly the earliest English-language work on constitutional history. Jefferson referred to Aland's views in the 1719 edition of this work, and in another preface by him on a 1748 collection of judicial decisions which he edited, titled Reports of Select Cases in All the Courts of Westminster-Hall.

== Early life and education ==
John Fortescue Aland, born on 7 March 1670, was the second son of Edmund Fortescue of Bierton, Buckinghamshire, and his wife, Sarah, eldest daughter of Henry Aland of County Waterford, Ireland. In 1704, upon succeeding to his mother's property in Ireland upon the death of his elder brother Edmund, he took Aland as an additional surname.

It is unclear whether he was educated at home or attended a public school, but at any rate he studied law at the Middle Temple in 1688 and was called to the Bar in 1695. He was then called to the Inner Temple in 1712, and made a bencher of that Temple in 1716.

== Legal, judicial and political career ==
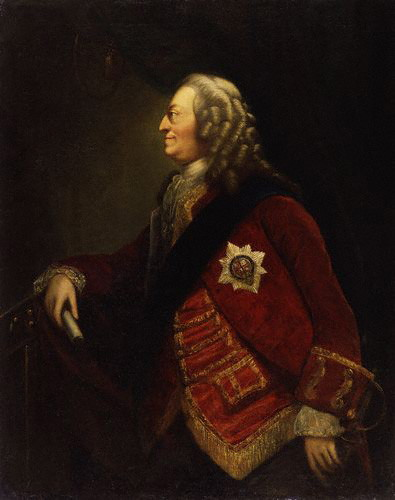
A c. 1753 portrait of George II by Thomas Worlidge. Did the King dismiss Fortescue Aland as a judge in 1727 for a decision that displeased His Majesty?

Fortescue Aland, who was elected a Fellow of the Royal Society on 20 March 1712 and became a King's Counsel in 1714, was appointed Solicitor General, first to the Prince of Wales (later George II) on 22 October that year, and to then to his father George I in December 1715. He succeeded his father-in-law Sir John Pratt, being returned unopposed by the Duke of Somerset as a Whig Member of Parliament for Midhurst at the 1715 general election. He then became solicitor-general, but vacated his parliamentary seat when he was raised to the Bench as a Baron of the Exchequer and knighted on 24 January 1717. He was a justice of the Court of King's Bench from the court vacation in the Michaelmas term of 1718 until 1727, and of the Court of Common Pleas from 1728 until the Trinity term in 1746.

Upon the death of George I and the accession of the Prince of Wales as George II on 11 June 1727, Fortescue Aland was not issued a fresh patent and was thus removed as a judge. One reason given for this was his response to the following question which had been referred by George I to the courts:

Whether the education and care of his majesty's (king George the First's) grandchildren in England, and of Prince Frederic [sic] (father to his present majesty [George III]), eldest son of his royal highness the prince of Wales (grandfather to king George the Third [George II]) when his majesty should think fit to cause him to come into England, and the ordering the places of abode, and appointing their governors, governesses, and other instructors, attendants, and servants, and the care and approbation of their marriages, when grown up, belonged as of right to his majesty, as king of the realm, or not?

The referral arose from a quarrel between the King and the Prince of Wales, which led to the King banishing the Prince of Wales and his wife Caroline from St James's Palace, the King's residence, and preventing them for a time from seeing their children who remained in the care of the King. Fortescue Aland was one of the ten judges who held that George I did have the right to make decisions concerning the education and marriages of his grandchildren. On George II's accession, Fortescue Aland wrote to George Walpole, one of the new King's Gentlemen of the Bedchamber, asking for protection "if there should be any difficulty in renewing my patent" due to George II's dissatisfaction with his opinion. He pointed out: "His Majesty has all along approved of my services, when I was his solicitor-general, whilst Prince of Wales; and when I was solicitor-general to his father; and himself made me a baron of the Exchequer by your recommendation; for he was regent and present in council when that was done."

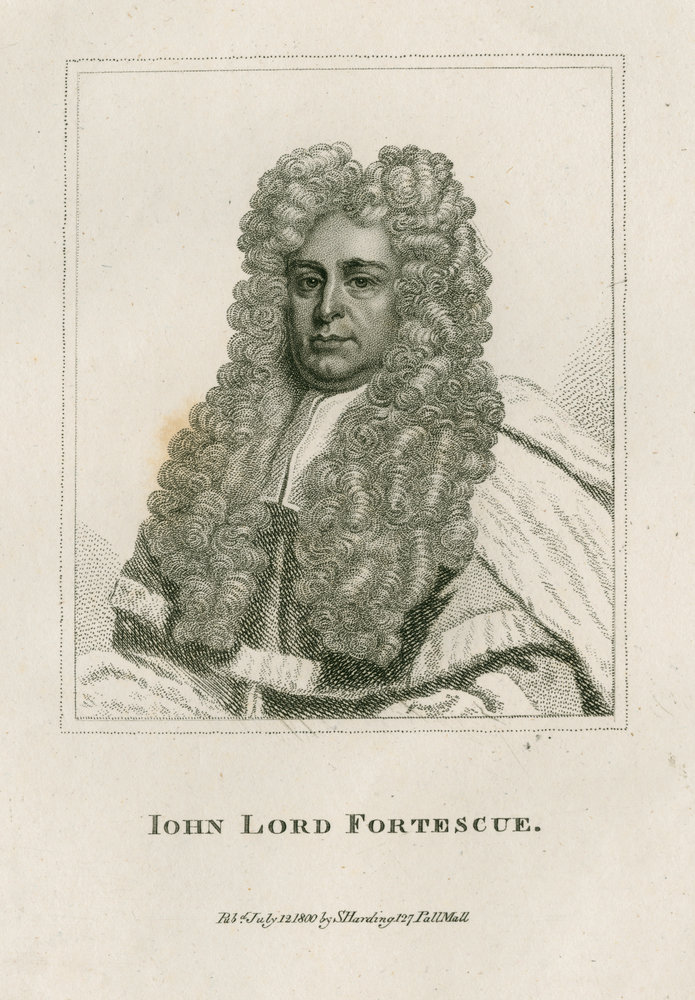
An 1800 stipple engraving of Fortescue Aland by Silvester Harding in the collection of The Royal Society. Fortescue Aland was elected a Fellow of the Society in 1712.

However, William Tooke, in his New and General Biographical Dictionary (1798), "very much doubt[ed] the authenticity of the said general assertion" as he did not see why George II, whom he regarded as "eminent for his regard to public justice", would have removed a judge "merely for giving his opinion in his judicial capacity, for executing his office faithfully, impartially, honestly, and according to the best of his skill and knowledge, without fear or affection, prejudice or malice, because his opinion happened to counteract the wishes of the heir apparent". In any case, if the King had in fact acted for this unjust motive, he had a change of heart and reinstated Fortescue Aland as a judge on 27 January 1728. This was the last occasion on which a judge failed to have a patent renewed on a monarch's accession to the throne. The University of Oxford conferred on Fortescue Aland an honorary Doctor of Civil Law (D.C.L.) by diploma on 4 May 1733. Tooke notes that the writers Francis Gregor and George Hicks said Fortescue Aland had "sat in the supreme courts of judicature with applause, and to general satisfaction; that he deservedly had the name of one perfectly read in the northern and saxon literature".

Following Fortescue Aland's resignation as a judge in 1746 at the age of 76, having served in that capacity for some 30 years, he was raised to the Peerage of Ireland as Baron Fortescue of Credan in the County of Waterford under the Privy Seal at Kensington on 17 June 1746, and by patent at Dublin on 15 August the same year. He died four months later on 19 December 1746.

== Publications and influence ==
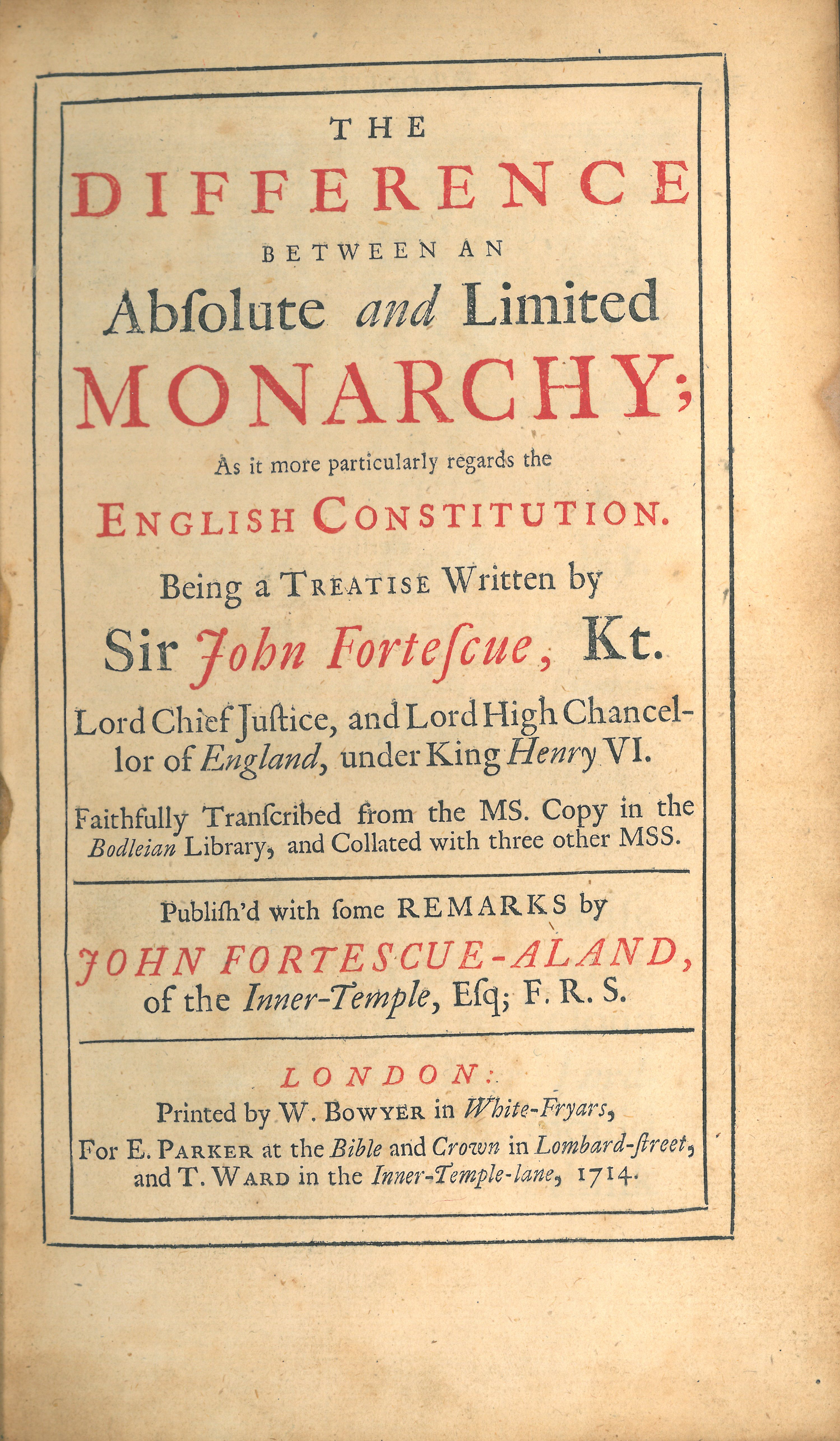
The title page of the first edition of Fortescue's The Difference between an Absolute and Limited Monarchy (1714), which Fortescue Aland arranged to be published

In 1714, Fortescue Aland produced a volume entitled The Difference between an Absolute and Limited Monarchy, based on a manuscript in the Bodleian Library by his distant ancestor Sir John Fortescue (c. 1394 – c. 1480). His own comments on the subject were in an extended preface. (The work was re-edited by Charles Plummer in 1885 as The Governance of England.) This has been claimed to be the earliest work in English on constitutional history.

A collection of judicial decisions edited by Fortescue Aland was published two years after his death as Reports of Select Cases in All the Courts of Westminster-Hall (1748).

Jefferson read the 1719 edition of The Difference between an Absolute and Limited Monarchy, and its recommendation of Anglo-Saxon for common lawyers, when he was studying under George Wythe. Later, in 1814, Jefferson mentioned the preface of Fortescue Aland's Reports of Select Cases with approval of his learning, when writing to Thomas Cooper. But he did not accept the way Fortescue Aland left the relationship of church law (in particular the Ten Commandments) to English common law an open question, preferring the analysis of David Houard.

== Family ==
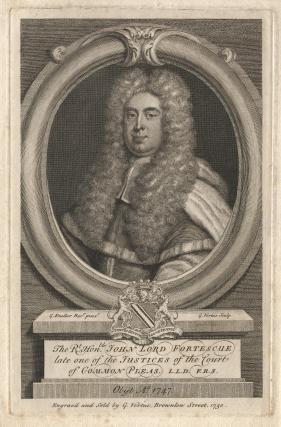
A 1750 line engraving of Fortescue Aland by George Vertue, also after the portrait by Kneller, with his coat of arms

Around 1707, Fortescue Aland married Grace Pratt, daughter of Sir John Pratt, the Lord Chief Justice of England and Wales. All of their five children predeceased him without issue. Following Grace's death, Fortescue Aland married Elizabeth Dormer (5 September 1691 – April 1794), daughter of Robert Dormer, also a judge of the Court of Common Pleas, on 29 December 1721 in St Bride's Church, London. They had one son, Dormer, who succeeded his father as the second and last Baron Fortescue of Credan upon Fortescue Aland's death. Fortescue Aland was buried in the chancel of St Mary the Virgin, Stapleford Abbotts, in Essex, and his second wife was later buried alongside him. As Dormer died unmarried on 9 March 1780 the family and title of Fortescue Aland became extinct, and his estates passed to the heir of Earl Clinton who was Lord Fortescue of Castle Hill.

The blazon of Fortescue Aland's coat of arms was as follows: "Azure, a bend engrailed Argent, cottised Or", the crest "a plain shield Argent", the supporters "two greyhounds Argent, collar and lined Gules", and the motto "Forte scutum salus ducum" ("A strong shield is the salvation of leaders").

== Notes ==
Parliament of Great Britain
Preceded by Sir John Pratt; William Woodward Knight	Member of Parliament for Midhurst; 1715–1716; With: William Woodward Knight	Succeeded by William Woodward Knight; The Viscount Midleton
Legal offices
Preceded by Nicholas Lechmere	Solicitor General for England and Wales; 1715–1717	Succeeded by William Thompson
Peerage of Ireland
New creation	Baron Fortescue of Credan; 1746	Succeeded by Dormer Fortescue-Aland
