= John Pratt (judge) =

English judge and politician

The Right Honourable Sir John Pratt
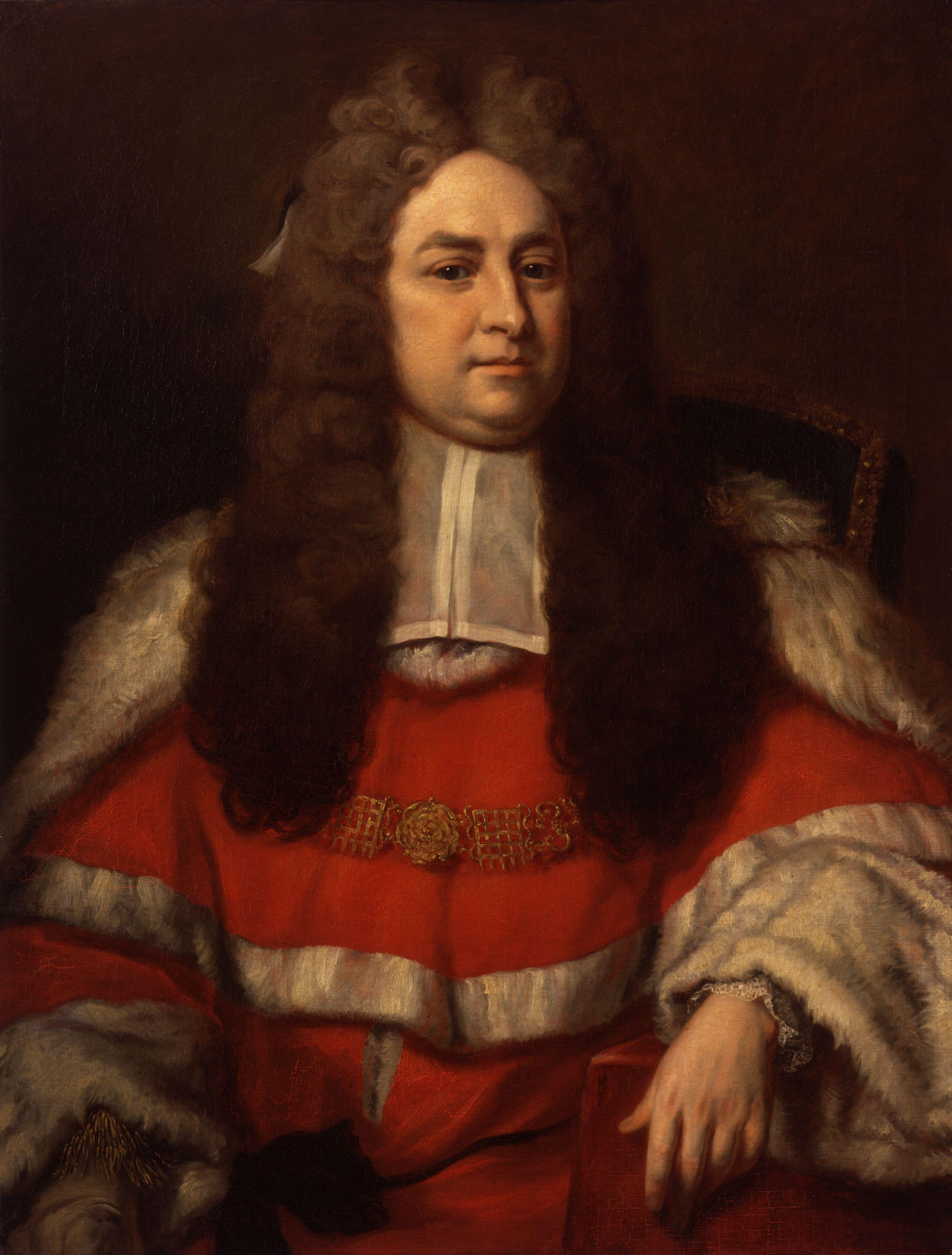
- Sir John Pratt by Michael Dahl

Lord Chief Justice of England
- In office 15 May 1718 – 2 March 1725

Chancellor of the Exchequer
- In office 2 February 1721 – 3 April 1721

Personal details
- Born: 1657 England
- Died: 1725 (aged 67–68) England
- Occupation: Judge, politician

Sir John Pratt PC (1657–1725) was an English judge and politician. He was Lord Chief Justice of England from 15 May 1718 until 2 March 1725. He was appointed as an interim Chancellor of the Exchequer on 2 February 1721 until 3 April 1721.

== Life ==
He was the son of Richard Pratt of Standlake, Oxfordshire. After matriculating at Magdalen Hall, Oxford, on 14 March 1672–3, he migrated to Wadham College where he was elected scholar in 1674, and fellow in 1678. He graduated B.A. in 1676, and proceeded M.A. in 1679.

Pratt was admitted on 18 November 1675 a student at the Inner Temple, where he was called to the bar on 12 February 1682. He appeared for the Crown before the House of Lords in Sir John Fenwick's case, 16–17 December 1696, and before the House of Commons for the East India Company in support of the petition for a charter on 14 June and 1 July 1698. He was made serjeant-at-law on 6 November 1700, and was heard by a committee of the House of Commons as counsel for the court of exchequer against a bill for curtailing the fees of the officers of that court on 25 February 1706.

On 17 January 1710 Pratt was assigned, with Sir Simon Harcourt, as counsel for Henry Sacheverell, but declined to act. On 20 December 1711 he appeared before the House of Lords in support of the patent conferring an English dukedom on James Douglas, 4th Duke of Hamilton. On 28 December 1711 he was returned to parliament for Midhurst, for which he sat a silent (or all but) member until the dissolution which followed the accession of George I. Meanwhile, on Lord Cowper's recommendation, he was raised to a puisne judgeship in the court of king's bench, and was sworn in accordingly on 22 November 1714 and knighted.

On the question of prerogative submitted to the judges in January 1718, whether the custody of the royal grandchildren was vested in the Prince of Wales or the king, Pratt concurred with the majority of his colleagues in favour of the Crown. He was one of the commissioners of the great seal in the interval (18 April–22 May 1718) between the resignation of Lord Chancellor Cowper and the seal's transference to Lord Keeper Parker. He succeeded the latter, 15 May, as lord chief justice of the court of king's bench, being sworn of the Privy Council on 9 October.

In the case of Colbatch v. Bentley, in 1722 (see John Colbatch, Richard Bentley) he resisted the combined influence of Sir Robert Walpole and Lord Macclesfield, which Bentley had enlisted in his interest. Walpole could only explain it by supposing that Pratt was conscious of having "got to the top of his preferment". His treatment of the Jacobite Christopher Layer has damaged his reputation.

Pratt bought, about 1705, the manor of Stidulfe's Place, which he renamed Wilderness, in the parish of Seal, Kent; also, in 1714, Bayham Priory, in the parish of Frant, Sussex, the ancient church of which he disroofed. He died at his house in Great Ormond Street, London, on 24 February 1725.

== Family ==
Pratt married twice.

By his first wife Elizabeth, daughter of Henry Gregory, rector of Middleton-Stoney, Oxfordshire, he had issue four daughters and five sons, including:

- His heir John, his fourth son by his first wife (see Robert Tracy 1655–1735).
- Of Pratt's daughters by his first wife, the second, Grace, married Sir John Fortescue Aland.

By his second wife Elizabeth, daughter of Hugh Wilson, canon of Bangor, he had four sons and four daughters.

- Charles Pratt, 1st Earl Camden was the third son by the second marriage.
- Jane, his second daughter by his second wife, married Nicholas Hardinge
- Anna Maria, his third daughter by the same wife, married Thomas Barrett Lennard, 16th Baron Dacre.

== Cases ==
- Armory v Delamirie (1722) 1 Strange 505

== See also ==
- Lord Chief Justice
- Lord Camden

Assembly seats
Preceded by Robert Orme; Lawrence Alcock	Member of Parliament for Midhurst; 1711–1715; With: Lawrence Alcock 1711–1713; William Woodward Knight 1713–1715	Succeeded by William Woodward Knight; John Fortescue Aland
Legal offices
Preceded by The Earl of Macclesfield	Lord Chief Justice of the King's Bench; 1718–1725	Succeeded by Robert Raymond
Political offices
Preceded by John Aislabie	Chancellor of the Exchequer; 1721	Succeeded by Robert Walpole
