= Old English alphabet =

Old English alphabet may refer to:

- Anglo-Saxon runes (futhorc), a runic alphabet used to write Old English from the 5th century
- Old English Latin alphabet, a Latin-derived alphabet used to write Old English from the 8th to the 12th centuries
