= Tom Price Senior High School =

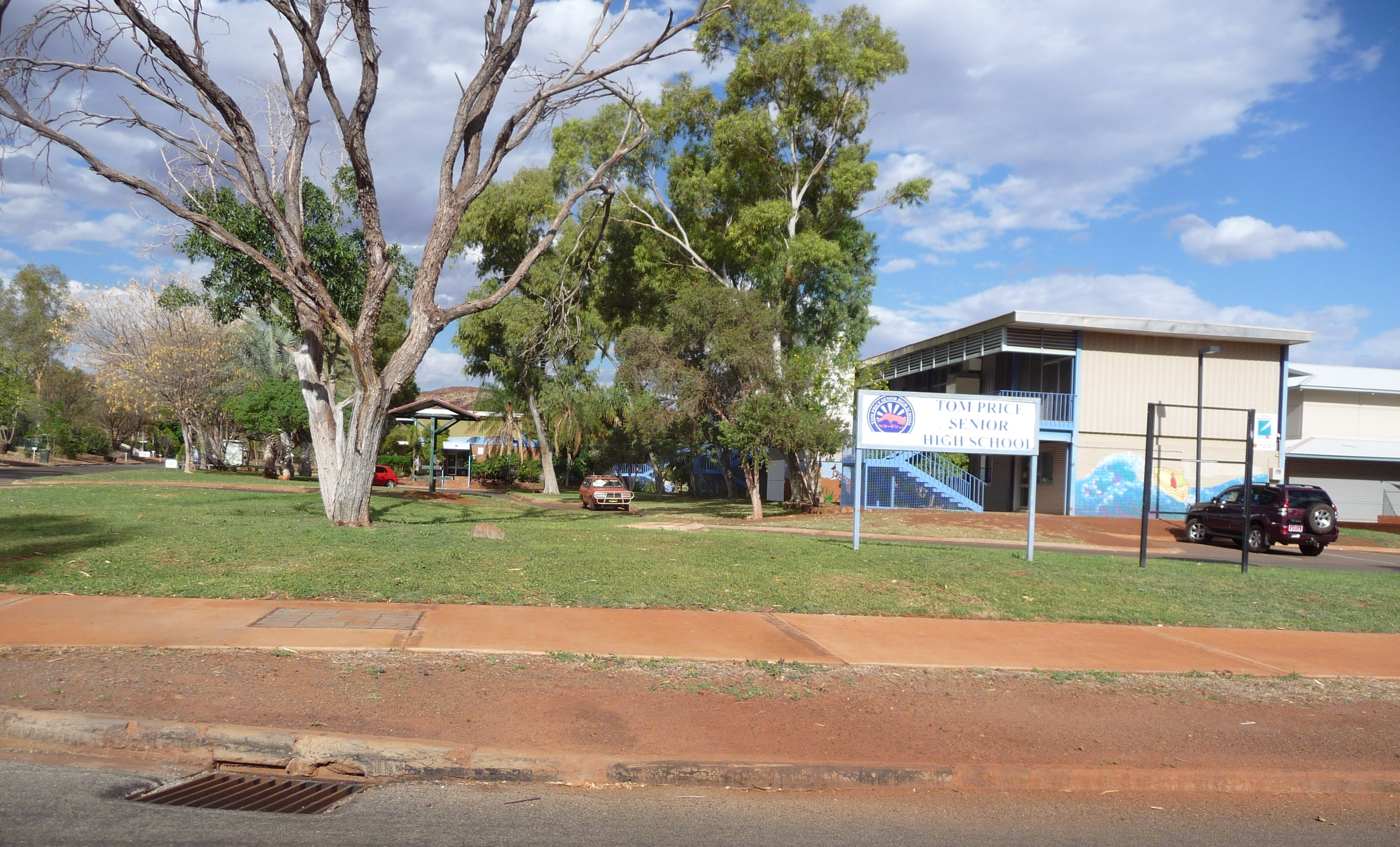

Location
- Tom Price, Western Australia; Australia; 22°41′15″S 117°47′36″E

Information
- Type: Government comprehensive secondary school
- Motto: Not for self but for all
- Established: 1971; 55 years ago
- Educational authority: WA Department of Education
- Principal: Stephanie McDonald
- Teaching staff: 31.2 FTE (2023)
- Years: 7–12
- Enrolment: 305 (2023)
- Campus type: Remote
- Colours: Red, white and blue
- Website: tompriceshs.wa.edu.au

Tom Price Senior High School is a government comprehensive secondary school located in Tom Price, a regional centre 1,092 kilometres (679 mi) north east of Perth, Western Australia.

The school is operated by the WA Department of Education. The school principal is Trevor Henderson.

Established as a district high school in 1971 it enrolled students from Year 1 to Year 10. With an enrolment of 700 students, the school became a senior high school in 1995, switching to enrolling students from Year 8 to Year 12. Enrolments at the school have been reasonably steady over the past few years with 242 students enrolled in 2007, 254 in 2008, 250 in 2009, 238 in 2010, 245 in 2011, 246 in 2012 and 312 in 2018. In 2023, 32 percent of enrolled students identified as Indigenous Australians and 15 percent as being from a language background other than English.

== See also ==
- List of schools in rural Western Australia
- Education in Western Australia
