= Fortescue National Football League =

Australian rules football competition

- Sport: Australian rules football
- Founded: 1970
- No. of teams: Paraburdoo Saints Tom Price Panthers Tom Price Tigers Townsite Eagles
- Country: Australia
- Venue: Tom Price Paraburdoo
- Most recent champion: Townsite Eagles
- Most titles: Townsite Eagles (22)

The Fortescue National Football League, named after the Fortescue River, is an Australian rules football competition based in the Pilbara region of Western Australia. It features three clubs (Panthers, Tigers, Townsite Eagles) from the town of Tom Price and one (Saints) from Paraburdoo. It was founded in 1970.

The league is affiliated with the West Australian Football Commission through the Western Australian Country Football League.

== History ==
Australian Rules football commenced in Tom Price with a social game between workers in the Pit ( Mine area) and Crushing and Screening area in late 1969 or early 1970. Following the success of that game, an informal meeting was held at a residence in Willow Road to proceed with the establishment of a competition. A further meeting was held to formally establish the structure of the committee and guidelines for conducting the competition along with delegation areas from which the teams were to be derived from.

At this meeting Ted Routley was elected the inaugural president, Max Tredrea secretary and Ben Jenke treasurer. The teams were to be composed of players who worked in the respective work areas of the Mining operations. i.e., The Hill Football club was composed of players who worked in the actual pit area, Crushers from the Crushing and Screening and rail operations, Centrals from the Mine administration, workshop and supply areas and Towns employees from town services staff, banks, post office, catering, airlines and retail establishments. Colin (Poppa) Bielski, Hamersley Irons’ popular Liaison Officer (who knew almost nothing of Australian Football) was duly appointed patron and donated the Bielski Medal for the best fairest and best player in the competition. Ben Jenke, the inaugural treasurer was the first umpire, being the only one with any experience.

The competition was initially known as the Fortescue National Football Association, but later removed the word “Association” and replaced it with “League”.

Only one game could be played each week due to the oval, which by now had a beautiful covering of grass, being shared with teams from other sporting codes. Therefore, each team played a game every two weeks. Two sets of Guernseys were purchased by Max Tredrea, one being gold with blue trimmings and the other blue with gold trimmings. Hill, later that season, purchased a set of Guernseys of their own based on West Perth colours. Initial coaches were Townsite - Ray Farrelly, Paul Pouncett - Crushers (now Tigers), David Prime - Centrals (later merged with Hill to form Panthers) and Peter Passamani - Hill.

Winners of the first game played were Townsite who went through the season undefeated only to narrowly lose the Grand Final to Hill. The inaugural Bielski medal winner was Des Routley (the president's son) from Townsite. The reopening of Hamersley Irons’ Paraburdoo operations in 1973 saw a team named Saints from Paraburdoo entering the competition and winning the premiership in their first year, repeating it in 1976 after being runners-up in 1974 to Centrals. Another team from Paraburdoo, Demons, entered the competition in 1974 bringing to a total of six clubs. In 1973 Fortescue entered a team in the ‘C’ Section of the Wesfarmers Country Championships winning the Section. However 1974 in B Section of the championships the League was unsuccessful.

The inaugural BP Championships was held in Mt Newman in 1976 for North West Leagues and was won by Fortescue who went on to repeat their success in 1978 and 1979 They were runners up in 1977 and 1980.

In 1979 Ken Turner, Russell Schumacher, Reg Dube’ and Alan Stott with cooperation from Bob Cramer and others provided financial assistance to purchase premises to establish the Crushers Football and Sporting Club. A liquor licence was obtained and the club was duly established. This trend was adopted by other clubs in the competition with Towns and Demons following soon after.

This move established Crushers football team, by now known as Tigers as formidable force in the competition, winning their first premiership in 1983 (coached by Geoff Baldock) and repeating it in 1984. The 1984 Grand final was the first played in Paraburdoo with Demons and Tigers clashing. Demons were to taste success in 1985.

There were many outstanding footballers that missed out on winning the Bielski. These included Don Newman, Clem Thompson, Drew Schapel, Ray Sellars, Leon Warren, Robert Foan, David Jackson and Barry Peters. David Maher from the Tigers played 311 league and combined games during his stellar career with the club, spanning seventeen seasons and capping his career off by winning two Bielski Medals.

Les Becker was at the helm of the League's combined sides in the 1970s, coaching it to three BP Championship wins. He also coached with success at Centrals and later went on to coach Tigers.

Charlie Salmon also coached Tigers for a number years culminating in a premiership in 1989. He went on to coach Pioneers in the Newman National Football, becoming President of that league, and umpiring. He died in unfortunate circumstances, and was laid to rest with the 1989 premiership flag at his side. The umpiring fraternity are notable as well, with Marty Tompkins being one who worked for the league throughout his career. Barry Peters, Ben Jenke, Barley Bogar, Chris Clowser, Roger Nancarrow, David Schumacher, Lance White, Terry Hutton, Bob Foan and Colin Cooke (umpire and convenor today) have all worked with the league as well.

The league tribunals had many players believing they had been wronged, claiming to have a better knowledge of the rules than the members of the panel. Kevin Hagan, the local Justice of Peace sat regularly on tribunals and earned the reputation of “The Hanging Judge”. One player was overheard to have said that he “would rather go to the gallows than front the Judge”. He would often request that “the guilty party” be brought in to have his case heard. Compared to other leagues the Fortescue is a “young” league, but during its existence it has had its share of controversy, tribulations and successes.

The league has had players from all states and nationalities spread throughout the clubs over the years. A survey carried out during the mid seventies revealed that over eighty per cent of the players originated from outside of Western Australia.

Australian Football since its inception 1970 in Tom Price has broken down divisions that had emanated in the workplace and many new friendships were created across the working environment in the region. Passion generated from the introduction of football brought the towns to life once the season started creating a healthy rivalry.

Hamersley Iron Pty Ltd (now Rio Tinto) and the Shire of Ashburton must be acknowledged for the provision and maintenance of the wonderful facilities that football in the communities enjoy.

The league congratulates the Country Football League for its initiative in compiling the publication and trust it will receive wide acclaim from football lovers. In conclusion recognition must be given to those who have acknowledged the final siren and sadly are not with us today. Memories of your involvement are treasured and contributions held sincerely in high esteem. You are not forgotten.

In the 2011 season forward Simon Ponter, playing for Paraburdoo, set a new all-time league record, kicking 106 goals in 11 matches. He became the first player in league history to kick 100 goals in a season. He kicked 18 goals in a single game against the Tom Price Tigers in June 2011.

In the 2022 season Guy Lawson, playing for the Tom Price Tigers managed to kick 0 goals for the season despite being primarily a forward.

By Adrian Marshall: Adrian worked with MMA at Tom Price in 1970, was involved in organising the inaugural competition and played with Towns. He left within a few years but returned to Paraburdoo when that project started around 1973. The Pilbara Championship Fairest & Best Player Medal is named after him.

== Clubs ==
=== Locations ===
Locations of the 2025 Fortescue National FL clubs

Club	Colours	Nickname	Home Ground	Est.	Years in FNFL	Premierships	
Club	Colours	Nickname	Home Ground	Est.	Years in FNFL	Total	Years
Paraburdoo		Saints	Paraburdoo Sports Oval, Paraburdoo	1973	1973-	10	1973, 1976, 1990, 1991, 2009, 2015, 2016, 2019, 2022, 2025
Tigers (Crushers 1970-83)		Tigers	Tom Price Oval, Tom Price	1970	1970-	11	1983, 1984, 1989, 1992, 1993, 1995, 1997, 1998, 2000, 2004, 2021
Tom Price Panthers		Panthers	Tom Price Oval, Tom Price	1992	1992-	3	1996, 2012, 2013
Townsite		Eagles	Tom Price Oval, Tom Price	1970	1970-	22	1975, 1977, 1978, 1979, 1986, 1994, 1999, 2001, 2002, 2003, 2005, 2006, 2007, 2008, 2010, 2011, 2014, 2017, 2018, 2023, 2024, 2026

== Former clubs ==
Club	Colours	Nickname	Home Ground	Est.	Years in FNFL	Premierships		Fate
Club	Colours	Nickname	Home Ground	Est.	Years in FNFL	Total	Years	Fate
Centrals		Magpies	Tom Price Oval, Tom Price	1970	1970–1991	6	1971, 1974, 1980, 1981, 1982, 1988	Merged with Hill to form Panthers in 1992
Hill			Tom Price Oval, Tom Price	1970	1970–1991	2	1970, 1972	Merged with Centrals to form Panthers in 1992
Paraburdoo		Demons	Paraburdoo Sports Oval, Paraburdoo	1974	1974–1995	1	1985	Folded after 1995 season

== Grand final results ==
Year	Premiers	Score	Runners up	Score
1970	Hill	10.19 (79)	Towns	9.10 (64)
1971	Centrals	16.20 (116)	Crushers	13.11 (89)
1972	Hill	9.11 (65)	Crushers	8.13 (61)
1973	Saints	13.19 (97)	Hill	11.13 (79)
1974	Centrals	21.31 (157)	Saints	15.13 (103)
1975	Towns	18.18 (126)	Hill	16.8 (104)
1976	Saints	19.21 (135)	Towns	17.14 (116)
1977	Towns	18.15 (123)	Crushers	12.13 (85)
1978	Towns	17.13 (115)	Saints	10.16 (76)
1979	Towns	13.18 (96)	Saints	10.19 (79)
1980	Centrals	20.12 (132)	Towns	10.17 (77)
1981	Centrals	12.10 (82)	Saints	8.8 (56)
1982	Centrals	17.9 (111)	Towns	10.16 (76)
1983	Crushers	19.14 (128)	Saints	11.9 (75)
1984	Tigers	14.13 (97)	Demons	11.20 (86)
1985	Demons	15.14 (104)	Towns	11.8 (74)
1986	Towns	18.19 (127)	Tigers	16.16 (112)
1987	?		Demons	
1988	Centrals	11.15 (81)	Tigers	11.15 (81)
1988	Centrals	15.13 (103)	Tigers	9.13 (67)
1989	Tigers	16.23 (119)	Hill	14.15 (99)
1990	Saints	26.25 (181)	Hill	8.11 (59)
1991	Saints		Tigers	
1992	Tigers		Demons	
1993	Tigers		Saints	
1994	Towns	10.10 (70)	Tigers	7.11 (53)
1995	Tigers	9.9 (63)	Panthers	5.8 (38)
1996	Panthers	15.12 (102)	Tigers	12.8 (80)
1997	Tigers	15.7 (97)	Panthers	8.5 (53)
1998	Tigers	13.9 (87)	Panthers	6.4 (40)
1999	Towns	15.12 (102)	Tigers	5.6 (36)
2000	Tigers	11.11 (77)	Towns	4.6 (30)
2001	Towns	11.13 (79)	Tigers	5.13 (43)
2002	Towns	13.10 (88)	Tigers	6.9 (45)
2003	Towns	20.9 (129)	Tigers	6.4 (40)
2004	Tigers	7.15 (57)	Towns	8.5 (53)
2005	Towns	26.9 (165)	Panthers	5.6 (36)
2006	Towns	24.15 (159)	Panthers	3.4 (22)
2007	Towns	16.13 (109)	Panthers	9.9 (63)
2008	Towns	13.12 (90)	Panthers	13.7 (85)
2009	Saints	13.6 (84)	Towns	9.12 (66)
2010	Towns	14.16 (100)	Saints	10.10 (70)
2011	Towns	17.10 (112)	Saints	6.9 (45)
2012	Panthers	16.16 (112)	Towns	12.10 (82)
2013	Panthers	14.14 (98)	Towns	10.7 (67)
2014	Towns	19.12 (126)	Panthers	12.10 (82)
2015	Saints	12.13 (85)	Panthers	7.7 (49)
2016	Saints	15.9 (99)	Towns	10.9 (69)
2017	Towns	8.14 (62)	Saints	8.11 (59)
2018	Towns	23.13 (151)	Tigers	3.11 (29)
2019	Saints	9.11 (65)	Towns	8.12 (60)
2021	Tigers	9.7 (61)	Towns	7.11 (53)
2022	Saints	10.13 (73)	Tigers	7.3 (45)
2023	Towns	10.10 (70)	Saints	8.8 (56)
2024	Towns	14.9 (93)	Saints	3.10 (28)
2025	Saints	8.10 (58)	Panthers	8.4 (52)
2026	Towns	17.7 (109)	Saints	8.10 (58)
