= Thomas Fortescue =

Thomas Fortescue may refer to:

- Thomas Fortescue (Wallingford MP) (1534–1611), English MP for Wallingford (UK Parliament constituency)
- Thomas Fortescue (1683–1769), Irish politician, MP for Dundalk 1727–60
- Thomas Fortescue, 1st Baron Clermont (1815–1887), Irish Whig politician
- Thomas Fortescue (1744–1799), MP for Trim in the Irish House of Commons 1768–99
- Thomas Fortescue (secretary) (1784–1872), Anglo-Indian civilian and secretary
