= Edmund Fortescue =

Edmund Fortescue may refer to:

- Edmund Fortescue (died 1624) (1560–1624)
- Edmund Fortescue (died 1647) (1610–1647)
- Sir Edmund Fortescue, 1st Baronet (1642–1666)
