= Hugh Fortescue =

Hugh Fortescue may refer to:

- Hugh Fortescue (1665–1719), British politician
- Hugh Fortescue, 1st Earl Clinton (1696–1751), British peer
- Hugh Fortescue, 1st Earl Fortescue (1753–1841), British peer
- Hugh Fortescue, 2nd Earl Fortescue (1783–1861), British Whig politician
- Hugh Fortescue, 3rd Earl Fortescue (1818–1905), British peer and politician
- Hugh Fortescue, 4th Earl Fortescue (1854–1932), English Liberal politician
- Hugh Fortescue, 5th Earl Fortescue (1888–1958), British peer and Conservative politician
