= Baron Fortescue of Credan =

Baron Fortescue of Credan, in the County of Waterford, was a title in the Peerage of Ireland. It was created on 15 August 1746 for John Fortescue Aland. The title became extinct on the death of his son, the second Baron, in 1781.

== Barons Fortescue of Credan (1746) ==
- John Fortescue Aland, 1st Baron Fortescue of Credan (1670–1746)
- Dormer Fortescue-Aland, 2nd Baron Fortescue of Credan (1723–1781)
