= William Fortescue =

William Fortescue may also refer to:

- William Fortescue (judge) (1687–1749), British judge, Master of the Rolls 1741–1749
- William Fortescue (died 1629) (c. 1562–1629), MP for Sudbury, Chipping Wycombe and Stockbridge
- William Fortescue, 1st Earl of Clermont (1722–1806), Irish politician
- William Fortescue, 2nd Viscount Clermont (1764–1829), Irish politician, nephew of the above
- William Fortescue (1733–1816), Irish politician, MP for Monaghan Borough 1798–1800
