= Nicholas Fortescue the Younger =

English Knight of St. John

Sir Nicholas Fortescue the younger (c. 1605–1644), was an English Knight of St. John.

He was the fourth son of Sir Nicholas Fortescue, Chamberlain of the Exchequer. His father was throughout his life a member of the Roman Catholic Church, and his sons were brought up in that religion. It is probable that the memory of Sir Adrian Fortescue, who had late in his life become a member of the Order of St. John, was cherished among his kinsmen, who adhered to the faith for the sake of which they believed him to have died a martyr, and it may be assumed that this feeling inspired Nicholas with the ambition to resuscitate the order, which had completely died out in England. In 1637 he went to Malta, furnished, if Pozzo is to be believed, the historian of the order, with a direct commission from Queen Henrietta Maria, who, "in her zeal for the restoration of the true religion" in her adopted country, desired to revive the English branch of the order. Fortescue was received as a Knight of Malta in 1638, and his project was favourably reported upon to the Grand Master, the Pope, and Cardinal Barbarini, protector of the order, by a commission appointed to investigate the matter. The chief difficulty, which proved insuperable, was to procure the sum of twelve thousand scudi, to be expended in buildings, fees, and other expenses necessary to the refoundation of the order in England. The negotiations extended over some years, during which time Fortescue travelled to and from England several times. During one of his journeys he was a guest of the English College at Rome, where, as the Strangers' Book of the college shows, he dined with John Milton, like himself travelling abroad. In 1642 the scheme was finally abandoned, owing, says Pozzo, to the "impious turbulence of the English people, which overthrew alike the cause of holy religion and of its royal patroness". Sir Nicholas, with his brothers William and Edmund, joined the royal army. According to the Loyal Martyrology he was slain in a skirmish in Lancashire while advancing with Prince Rupert's army to the relief of York; but it is more probable that he was killed at the Battle of Marston Moor, since he was buried at Skipton on 5 July 1644.

The following character of Sir Nicholas is given in Lloyd's Memoirs of Excellent Personages:

"Sir Nicholas Fortescue, a knight of Malta, slain in Lancashire, whose worth is the more to be regarded by others, the less he took notice of himself; a person of so dextrous an address that when he came into notice he came into favour; when he entered the court he had the chamber, yea the closet of a prince; a gentleman that did much in his person, and, as he would say, let reputation do the rest; he and Sir Edmund Fortescue were always observed so wary as to have all their enemies before them and leave none behind them".

The allusion to Sir Edmund may refer to Sir Edmund Fortescue of Fallapit; but it seems more probable that it relates to Edmund, brother of Sir Nicholas, who held a post at court as Keeper of Sewer (overseer) to the queen.
