= Charles Plummer (historian) =

British historian (1851–1927)

Charles Plummer FBA
- Born: 1851
- Died: 1927 (aged 75–76)
- Education: University of Oxford (BA, SCL)
- Occupations: Historian; cleric

Charles Plummer, FBA (1851–1927) was an English historian and cleric, best known as the editor of Sir John Fortescue's The Governance of England, and for coining the term "bastard feudalism".

== Early life and education ==
He was the fifth son of Matthew Plummer of St Leonards-on-Sea, Sussex. He matriculated at Corpus Christi College, Oxford in 1869, graduating B.A. and S.C.L. in 1873 and becoming a Fellow.

== Career ==
Plummer was an editor of Bede, and also edited numerous Irish and Hiberno-Latin texts, including the two volume Vitae Sanctorum Hiberniae (1910), a modern companion volume to which is Richard Sharpe's Medieval Irish saints' lives: an introduction to Vitae Sanctorum Hiberniae.

Plummer edited John Earle's Two of the Saxon Chronicles Parallel (1865), producing a Revised Text with notes, appendices, and glossary in 1892. This work presented the A and E texts of the Anglo-Saxon Chronicle.

Plummer delivered the Ford Lectures at Oxford University in 1901.
