= Richard Fortescue =

Richard Fortescue may refer to:

- Richard Fortescue (politician) (c. 1517–1570), English member of parliament and landowner
- Richard Fortescue, 7th Earl Fortescue (1922–1993), British peer
- Richard Fortescue (soldier) (died 1655), English soldier
