= J. Fortescue =

Fictitious American surgeon

Honorable J. Fortescue (alleged to have been born in 1868) was a nonexistent American surgeon and founder of the International Board of Hygiene that the League of Nations recognised in 1926.

Honorable J. Fortescue was a brainchild of San Diego pathologist Rawson Joseph Pickard (1882–1963). The International Board of Hygiene was little else than a group of drinking friends who had founded it in a Turf Bar in Tijuana, Baja California, during Prohibition in the United States. Pickard named his character after John Fortescue (1385–1479), an English lawyer.

Because most of the meetings were organised outside the borders of the U.S., the Board had to be international, and because many of the members were medical professionals, its theme was hygiene—the League of Nations already had its own International Board of Health. Anyone who had attended the meeting once became a lifetime member. On October 21, 1926, Pickard sent a long letter to the League of Nations headquarters in Geneva and received recognition in a couple of weeks.

In the following years, various organisations and publications expressed interest about the Board and its reclusive president Fortescue. The United States National Research Council included him in a directory of child psychologists and he was invited to join the American Conference on Hospital Service. Pickard wrote dozens of articles in Fortescue's name and answered journalists' enquiries in his stead. It appears none of the recipients ever bothered to check his credentials.

At the same time, the membership of the International Board of Hygiene spread by invitation. Every meeting was concluded with the reading of a scientific paper.

The 1936 Who's Who in San Diego included an entry about Fortescue, listing his multiple publications, memberships in associations, medical studies and travels, including winning the "Fleischmann prize" (actually a letter-writing contest for Fleischmann's Yeast). It also claimed that his mother was Lola Montez and that he lived in Paris. His only official address was "The International Board of Hygiene, 1908 Eutaw Place, Baltimore, Maryland". Some of the studies would have been really groundbreaking at the time, preceding such scientific studies like Kinsey surveys.

Rawson Pickard died in 1963. The correspondence of the Honorable J. Fortescue ceased as well.
