= Anthony Fortescue =

Anthony Fortescue (d. 1570/71) was an English conspirator. It has generally been thought that he was the third son of Sir Adrian Fortescue, but this Anthony Fortescue had already left England and was settled in Padua when the conspiracy was hatched in the autumn of 1562.

== Fortescue and the Poles ==
Anthony Fortescue married Katherine Pole, gentlewoman, of the diocese of Chichester, on 20 May 1544. Katherine was the daughter of sir Geoffrey Pole of Lordington, Sussex, younger brother of Cardinal Reginald Pole. The third son of sir Adrian Fortescue, the conspirator's namesake, was born in 1535/36. He was thus too young to have married in 1544. The future conspirator, on the other hand, is not likely to have been born much after about 1525. As Katherine Pole's husband, he was also the brother-in-law of his fellow-conspirators : Arthur Pole and Edmund Pole. They probably died in 1570, as did Fortescue. When Katherine's mother, Constance Pakenham Pole, signed her will on 7 August 1570, two of her daughters were named as Katherine Fortescue and Mary Cufawde (viz. Cufford); but when Mary Cufawde signed her own will on 22 November 1571, she named her sister as Katherine Henslowe. Sometime between these two dates, then, Anthony Fortescue had died and his widow had married her second husband : Ralph Henslowe of Boarhunt in Hampshire. According to John Strype, Anthony Fortescue was the comptroller of the household of Cardinal Pole when he returned to England and became Archbishop of Canterbury. When Fortescue was arrested, he was said to have been a gentleman resident of Lambeth, which lends colour to Strype's comment, for Pole stayed at his palace in Lambeth when he did business in London. The two Poles, on the other hand, were said to have been living in London. The Lambeth connection makes it likely that it was the conspirator and not the non-conspirator, was one of the witnesses when Elizabeth Stafford, duchess of Norfolk, signed her will on 30 November 1558; for Elizabeth lived at Lambeth, too.

== Conspiracy and Imprisonment ==
Fortescue is remembered for his part in the conspiracy of 1562, but Strype mentions an earlier stage in its conception, dating back to 1558. On 22 November, order was given by the Privy Council for the apprehension of Anthony Fortescue, and two conjurors, named Kele and Prestal. They were all set at liberty three days later. The main course of events leading up to the conspirators’ arrest at on 11 October 1562 is fully set out in the indictment found at Southwark on 19 February 1563. Briefly, their plan was that Arthur Pole should be declared Duke of Clarence, a title to which he had some claim, and that under this pretence he should seek the assistance of the Guises in France to send him to Wales at the head of an army, where he would declare Mary Queen of Scots, to whom by now Edmund Pole was to have been married, as the rightful queen of England — and so march on London. They were said to have conspired to this end on 1 September 1562. Besides the three men already mentioned, there were five others, all gentlemen residents of London : John Prestall (who was cautioned in 1558), Humphrey Barwyke, Edward Cosyn, Richard Byngham, and Antony Spencer. Only Fortescue lived outside the city, at Lambeth, and it was here that the conspiracy was hatched. On 10 September, at Southwark, Prestall and Cosyn conjured up an ‘evil spirit’ to help them. On 16 September, Fortescue, with the help of Barwyke, informed the French and Spanish ambassadors of the conspirators’ designs, and asked for their help. On 10 October, Prestall and Cosyn went over to the continent to further the plot, and on 11 October, Fortescue hired Henry Watson to bring his boat to St Olave's Wharf in London. This would convey them to a ship from Flanders moored at Gravesend, which was then to take them over to the continent as well. But as they waited at a tavern called the Dolphin, they were discovered and arrested. Barwyke had been a spy all along. The conspirators caught at St Olaves were locked up in the Tower of London over the winter, before being brought to trial on 26 February. All but Fortescue pleaded not guilty, but they were all found guilty by the court, and sentenced to execution at Tyburn. However, they were all pardoned by the queen, and their sentence was commuted to one of life imprisonment. The Pole brothers were locked up in the Tower, where they were both still living in 1568, but seemed to have died shortly afterwards. Strype thought that Fortescue was released, but gives no evidence. At any rate, whether in prison or elsewhere, Anthony Fortescue, conspirator, died in 1570/71.

== Anthony Fortescue of Padua (1534/5-1608) ==
The non-conspirator was the third son of sir Adrian Fortescue and his second wife Anne Reade. After the execution of her first husband in 1539, either in that year or in 1540, Anne married Thomas Parry, who later became comptroller of the household of princess Elizabeth. In 1549, at the age of 14, this Anthony Fortescue was admitted to Winchester College, Hampshire, when he was said to be of Brightwell, in Oxfordshire. Brightwell is where the Parrys lived. He wrote a Latin poem on the occasion of the visit to the college of Edward VI in 1552. He seems to have gone up to New College, Oxford, by 1552, where he passed Bachelor of Common Law at Oxford on 30 May 1559. But he left Oxford soon after, for he was one of the twenty odd members of New College who were ‘purged’ in the visitation of Oxford in 1560, ‘for refusing to attend the English service in the Chapel’. Fortescue went straight to Padua, where he was a prominent member of the English nation at the university from 1561 onwards. Despite his absence from the country, his mother presented Fortescue to the rectory of Symondsbury in Dorset, on 27 April 1563, when his proxy was his elder brother Thomas Fortescue. By 1572, however, he had passed up this piece of revenue, for Thomas Fortescue presented it to William Hemmerford, instituted on 11 November. Thomas was the custodian of his brother Anthony's movable goods, including his books, for when he signed his will on 10 May 1608, he stipulated that all of these should ‘be safely kept and delyvered to the vse of [his] said brother’. But their fate is unknown.
