= Nicholas Fortescue the Elder =

Sir Nicholas Fortescue the Elder (1575?–1633) was an English Chamberlain of the Exchequer.

He was the eldest son of William Fortescue of Cookhill, and grandson of Sir Nicholas Fortescue, Groom Porter to Henry VIII, to whom the Cistercian nunnery of Cookhill, on the borders of Worcestershire and Warwickshire, was granted in 1542.

Fortescue, who was throughout his life a zealous Roman Catholic, for several years harboured at Cookhill the Benedictine monk, Augustine Baker. In 1605, after the Gunpowder Plot and the rising of the Roman Catholics of Warwickshire, Fortescue underwent several examinations, and fell under some suspicion on account of a large quantity of armour found in his house. His name appears twice in the Calendar of State Papers in connection with the plot. A letter from Chief-justice Anderson and Sheriff Warburton to the Privy council states that Fortescue of Warwickshire, though summoned to appear before them, had not come forward to be examined. A declaration by himself says that the armour in question has been in his house for five years, and adds that he has not seen Wintour, the conspirator, for eight years, and was not summoned to join the rising in Warwickshire. He succeeded in clearing himself from these suspicions and lived at Cookhill unmolested until about 1610, when he was appointed a commissioner of James's household and of the navy.

He was knighted in 1618, and in the same year, on the death of Sir John Poyntz (formerly Morice) of Chipping Ongar, he obtained the lucrative and honourable post of Chamberlain of the Exchequer, which he held until May 1625, when he resigned it. During 1622 and 1623 his name appears as serving on royal commissions, to inquire into the state of the plantations of Virginia and of Ireland, into the depredations committed by pirates on the high seas, and on royal grants of lands.

Fortescue died at his house in Fetter Lane on 2 November 1633, and was buried in the private chapel of Cookhill, where his tomb may still be seen. He married Prudence, daughter of William Wheteley of Holkham, Norfolk, by whom he had five sons, William, Francis, Edmund, Nicholas, John, and two daughters.
