= Adrian Fortescue (martyr) =

English Roman Catholic martyr

Blessed Adrian Fortescue TOSD
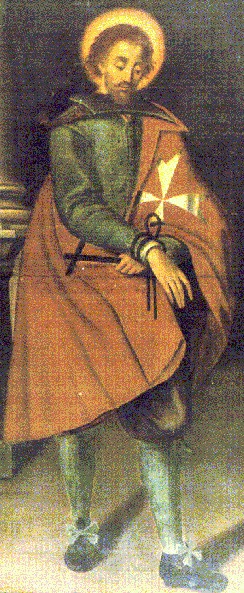
- A painting of Fortescue located at the Collegio di San Paolo in Rabat, Malta
- Born: c. 1476; Hertfordshire, England
- Died: 9 July 1539 (aged 62); Tower Hill, London, England
- Venerated in: Roman Catholic Church
- Beatified: 13 May 1895, Saint Peter's Basilica, Vatican City by Pope Leo XIII
- Feast: 9 July
- Attributes: Crown of martyrdom martyr's palm cross or crucifix bound hands sword axe in neck Knight of the Order of St. John

Sir Adrian Fortescue (c. 1476 – 9 July 1539) was a courtier at the court of King Henry VIII of England and member of the Third Order of Saint Dominic who was executed in 1539 and later beatified as a Roman Catholic martyr.

== Life ==
Adrian Fortescue was the son of Sir John Fortescue of Ponsbourne Park at Newgate Street in Hertfordshire. He descended from Richard Fortescue, younger brother of Sir Henry Fortescue (fl. 1426), Lord Chief Justice of the Common Pleas in Ireland, and of Sir John Fortescue (ca. 1394 – ca. 1480), Lord Chief Justice of England and Wales, all sons of Sir John Fortescue (fl.1422) of Whympston in the parish of Modbury, Devon, appointed in 1422 Captain of the captured Castle of Meaux, 25 miles NE of Paris. His mother Alice was the daughter of Geoffrey Boleyn, Lord Mayor of London, and great aunt to Henry VIII's second wife, Anne Boleyn.

He was made a Knight of the Bath in 1503. He spent most of his time in the country, busy with his lands and with county affairs. He lived at his wife's family seat at Stonor Park in Oxfordshire, where he served as a Justice of the Peace. Fortescue participated in England's wars against France in 1513 and 1523 and was present at the meeting in 1520 between Henry VIII and Francis I of France at the Field of the Cloth of Gold.

He was made a Knight of the Order of St. John in 1532 and the following year became a Dominican Tertiary of the Blackfriars of Oxford. He attended the coronation of Anne Boleyn in June of that year.

On 29 August 1534, he was arrested without any stated reason and taken to Woodstock, where he was questioned. He was freed after a period of months. In February 1539 he was again arrested, and in April he was among those condemned for treason without a trial by Parliament for unspecified acts presumably relating to hostility to Henry VIII's church policies. He was beheaded at the Tower of London on 9 July 1539. His servants were also killed for treason on the same day but were hanged, drawn and quartered at Tyburn.

== Family ==
Fortescue was twice married:

- first to Anne, daughter of Sir William Stonor and Anne Neville, daughter of John Neville, 1st Marquess of Montagu. Anne died in 1518. By his first wife, Fortescue had two daughters:
  - Margaret, married to Thomas Wentworth, 1st baron Wentworth;
  - Frances, married to Thomas Fitzgerald, 10th earl of Kildare.
- secondly to Anne, daughter of Sir William Rede, of Boarstall, Buckinghamshire and widow of Sir Giles Greville. By his second wife he had three sons and two daughters:
  - Sir John Fortescue of Salden, Chancellor of the Exchequer;
  - Sir Thomas Fortescue, MP Wallingford;
  - Sir Anthony Fortescue;
  - Elizabeth, married to Sir Thomas Bromley, lord chancellor of England;
  - Mary, whose son was Thomas Cavendish the circumnavigator.

Anne survived her husband, and afterwards married Sir Thomas Parry, comptroller of Queen Elizabeth's household. She was granted the manor of Great Washbourne in 1557.

== Veneration ==
The Order of St. John of Jerusalem (Order of Malta) has advocated devotion to Blessed Adrian as a martyr since the 17th century and Pope Leo XIII beatified him on 13 May 1895.

In 1970 a Sub-Priory of the Blessed Adrian Fortescue of the Order of Malta was founded and renamed in 1993 as Grand Priory of England.

== See also ==
- Thomas Dingley
