= Rusty (given name) =

Rusty is a given name.

Notable people with the name include:

== People ==
- Rusty Anderson (born 1959), American guitarist
- Rusty Areias (born 1949), American politician
- Rusty Bryant (1929–1991), American saxophonist
- Rusty Cooley (born 1970), American guitarist
- Rusty Crawford (1885–1971), Canadian ice hockey player
- Rusty Cundieff (born 1960), American actor and director
- Rusty Day (1945–1982), American musician
- Rusty Dedrick (1918–2009), American trumpeter
- Rusty DeWees (born 1960), American actor and comedian
- Rusty Draper (1923–2003), American singer
- Rusty Duke, American judge
- Rusty Edwards (born 1955), American hymn writer and minister
- Rusty Egan (born 1957), British drummer
- Rusty Fein (born 1982), American figure skater
- Rusty Frank, American dancer, choreographer, and historian
- Rusty Fricke (born 1964), American arena football player
- Rusty Gerhardt (born 1950), American baseball pitcher
- Rusty Glover (born 1966), American politician
- Rusty Goffe (born 1948), British dwarf entertainer
- Rusty Goodman (1933–1990), American gospel singer and songwriter
- Rusty Greer (born 1969), American baseball player
- Rusty Hamer (1947–1990), American actor
- Rusty Hardin (born 1941), American lawyer
- Rusty Harrison (born 1981), Australian speedway rider
- Rusty Hevelin (1922–2011), American science fiction publisher and collector
- Rusty Higgins, American saxophonist
- Rusty Hilger (1962–2019), American football player
- Rusty Hopkinson, Australian rock musician
- Rusty Humphries (born 1965), American radio host
- Rusty Jackson (1950–1997), American football player
- Rusty Jacobs (born 1967), American actor
- Rusty Jeffers (born 1964), American bodybuilder
- Rusty Joiner (born 1972), American model
- Rusty Jones (disambiguation), multiple people
- Rusty Keaulana (born 1966), American surfer
- Rusty Kidd (1946–2020), American politician
- Rusty Kruger (born 1975), Canadian lacrosse player
- Rusty Kuntz (born 1955), American baseball player
- Rusty LaRue (born 1973), American basketball player and coach
- Rusty Lemorande (born 1954), American screenwriter and film producer
- Rusty Lisch (born 1956), American football quarterback
- Rusty Long, American surfer, writer, and photographer
- Rusty Magee (1955–2003), American composer
- Rusty Mae Moore (1941–2022), American activist and educator
- Rusty Meacham (born 1968), American baseball pitcher
- Rusty Morrison (born 1956), American poet and publisher
- Rusty Nails (filmmaker) (born 1966), American filmmaker and musician
- Rusty Page (1908–1985), New Zealand rugby union player
- Rusty Paul (born 1952), American politician and the 2nd Mayor of Sandy Springs, Georgia
- Rusty Pierce (born 1979), American soccer player
- Rusty Robertson (1927–1989), New Zealand rowing coach
- Rusty Russell (disambiguation), multiple people
- Philip Rastelli (1918–1991), American mobster, boss of the Bonanno crime family
- Rusty Schweickart (born 1935), American astronaut, engineer, scientist and business executive
- Rusty Schwimmer (born 1962), American actress and singer
- Man Mohan Sinha (1933–2018), Indian Air Force air marshal
- Rusty Smith (disambiguation), multiple people
- Rusty Staub (1944–2018), American baseball player
- Rusty Theron (born 1985), South African cricketer
- Rusty Torres (born 1948), Puerto Rican baseball player
- Rusty Troy (born 1966), American soccer player
- Rusty Wallace (born 1956), American race car driver
- Rusty Warren (1930–2021), American comedian and singer
- Rusty Young (disambiguation), multiple people

== Fictional characters ==
- Rusty Brown, the protagonist of an American comic strip by Chris Ware
- Rusty Collins, a Marvel Comics character
- Rusty Griswold, a character in the National Lampoon's Vacation film franchise.
- Rusty Riley, the protagonist of an American newspaper comic strip
- Rusty Rodriguez, in the 1984 film Footloose
- Rusty Ryan (character), in the 2001 film Ocean's Eleven and its sequels
- Rusty Shackleford, the often-used alias of Dale Gribble from the television series King of the Hill
- Rusty Sterling, from Amityville 1992: It's About Time
- Rusty, a character from the children's book series The Railway Series and its TV adaptation Thomas and Friends
- Rusty, a character from Bluey
- Rusty Rose, the robotic creation of Amy, from New Yoke City, in Sonic Prime
- Rusty Cuyler, in the television series Squidbillies
- Rusty Irish, from The Sopranos episode Pax Soprana
- Rusty Millio, a character from The Sopranos

== See also ==
- Rusty (disambiguation)
