= Wallace Rasmussen =

American businessman and philanthropist (1914–2008)

- Born: Wallace Niels Rasmussen; July 11, 1914; Lincoln, Nebraska, U.S.
- Died: September 21, 2008 (aged 94); Nashville, Tennessee, U.S.
- Occupations: Businessman; philanthropist
- Title: Chairman & CEO, Beatrice Foods Company

Wallace Rasmussen (July 11, 1914 – September 21, 2008) was an American businessman and prominent philanthropist. Hired at Beatrice Foods Company in 1934 as an ice hauler, Rasmussen served as president and then chairman and chief executive officer of the former international food conglomerate, Beatrice, (now a part of ConAgra Foods) from 1976 until his retirement in 1980. Rasmussen rose to the top of the business with just a high school diploma.

== Early life ==
Rasmussen was born in Lincoln, Nebraska, on July 11, 1914. He was born to Lars Berg Rasmussen, a Danish immigrant, and Millie Wallick and raised on a dairy farm.

== Career ==
By the time Rasmussen graduated from high school at the age of 16, the Great Depression had ravaged the Rasmussen farm, leaving the family destitute. Working menial jobs, from delivering handbills door to door and cutting jigsaw puzzles to hiring himself out as a ranch hand, Rasmussen vowed that "if he ever landed work with a big company, he'd never let go of it".

In 1934, Rasmussen landed a job as an ice hauler for Beatrice Creamery Company, in Lincoln, Nebraska. He rose through the ranks, landing positions from chief engineer and plant manager to various district and regional supervisory posts. Rasmussen says he studied on his own, mastering each new job: "I only had a high school education, so I had to educate myself," he said. "Every time I got into something I might not know enough about, I'd go out and buy every book I could find on the subject".

By the 1960s, he had landed at company headquarters in Chicago, Illinois, serving in several vice presidential positions. In 1976, Rasmussen became president and CEO. In 1977, he was named chairman and CEO of Beatrice Foods Co, which, by this time, had become America's largest food processing company and a multi-billion-dollar business. During Rasmussen's tenure at Beatrice, he added many high-profile acquisitions to its portfolio, most notably the publicly traded Tropicana Products, Inc., which was acquired for $490 million in cash and preferred stock". After 47 years with Beatrice, Rasmussen retired in 1980.

== Reputation ==
Although a self-described "country boy," Rasmussen developed a reputation as a bold, tough, no-nonsense businessman, which spread in large part due to many media reports and his frequent stints as an interview subject of Pulitzer Prize-winning author and oral historian Studs Terkel, well known as a chronicler of the lives of ordinary Americans.

On the day he took over in 1976, Rasmussen told his predecessor, "I'm the chief executive, and I'm going to run things". Soon after, his "pugnacious style" and "aggressive leadership ushered in a series of boardroom brawls" resulting in the "resignation of his designated successor," whom The Wall Street Journal described as "outflanked and outmuscled". When asked for a comment, Rasmussen told the Chicago Tribune "I'm dedicated to outshining the last management".

Rasmussen's "pugnacious style" led him to make enemies and friends alike. Cal Turner Jr., former CEO of Dollar General Corp., once said about Rasmussen: "If you're trying to go into battle and do the right thing, he's the guy you want by your side".

Described by oral historian Studs Terkel as "the boss," "the chief executive officer of the corporation," "big boned and heavy-set, with calloused hands," "bluff and genial" and having "the appearance of the archetypal elderly workingman in Sunday clothes," Rasmussen was prominently featured in several of his books, most notably American Dreams: Lost and Found (1980), My American Century (1997) and Hope Dies Last: Keeping the Faith in Difficult Times (2003).

When Forbes named Rasmussen one of the toughest CEOs in the US, during his tenure at Beatrice Foods, Rasmussen used one of Terkel's interviews as a platform from which to issue his public response: "Forbes was listing the toughest CEOs in the country, and I was in that article. They had me saying, 'Do unto others before they do unto you.' I don't know whether I should have been happy with that, but I was OK. You have to show strength. Any sign of weakness and people are going to take advantage of you".

== Post-retirement ==
After his retirement from Beatrice, Rasmussen settled in Nashville, Tennessee, where he held seats on several corporate boards, including the boards of Dollar General, Clayton Homes, Shoney's and Commerce Union Bank.

Governor Lamar Alexander appointed Rasmussen chairman of the Tennessee Board of Corrections Commission where he served a period of three years.

== Philanthropy ==
Although he achieved success with only a high school diploma, Rasmussen was a staunch proponent of higher education. After his retirement from Beatrice, Rasmussen established the Rasmussen Foundation and devoted his philanthropic efforts to providing educational opportunities to hundreds of deserving students. While these educational opportunities provided by Rasmussen were innumerable, some of the most notable include the five annual scholarships that he sponsored at Belmont University and Vanderbilt University School of Medicine in Nashville, Tennessee, and the Rasmussen Foreign Student Exchange Program (now the Rasmussen Studies Abroad Scholarship) that he established at Belmont University in 1994. In 1996, he funded and established another studies abroad program, the Wallace N. Rasmussen Scholarship at North Central College in Naperville, Illinois.

== Honors and awards ==
Rasmussen's lifetime achievements were recognized when he was awarded a 1978 Horatio Alger Award, an honor bestowed upon outstanding Americans who, similar to characters in stories by Horatio Alger Jr., traditionally have started life in "humble circumstances" yet, "in spite of this early adversity, or many would say because of it, they have worked with great diligence to achieve success and the fulfillment of their dreams". Rasmussen received this award alongside other members of the Class of 1978 such as cosmetics tycoon Mary Kay Ash, Grammy Award-winning pianist George Shearing and baseball legend Hank Aaron.

In addition, he received the Golden Plate Award in 1977, from the American Academy of Achievement, a non-profit educational organization that recognizes "exemplars of excellence," the highest achievers in public service, business, science and exploration, sports and the arts. Rasmussen received this award along with such luminaries as renowned inventor R. Buckminster Fuller, music icon Stevie Wonder, legendary sportscaster Howard Cosell, and Pulitzer Prize-winning author Alex Haley.

== Personal life and death ==
On December 17, 1936, Rasmussen married Grace Irene Moreland (died 1993). They had two children, Ada and Walter. Wallace Rasmussen died after a long illness at his home in Nashville, Tennessee, on September 21, 2008.

== Writings and research ==
In 1994, Rasmussen and journalist Mike Haggerty released The Headline vs. the Bottom Line: Mutual Distrust Between Business and the News Media. Deemed a "landmark study" by Choice Reviews, the book was cited by Christopher R. Martin in his book, Framed!: Labor and the Corporate Media, and Jay William Lorsch, Leslie Berlowitz and Andy Zelleke in their book, Restoring Trust in American Business. Based on interviews with more than 630 journalists and high level executives, the study was done while Rasmussen and Haggerty served as visiting professional scholars at the Freedom Forum First Amendment Center at Vanderbilt University.

In 2002, Rasmussen published his life's story, The Ice Man's Life.
