= BIW =

BIW may refer to:

- Body in white (BiW), a stage in automotive design
- biw, ISO 639 language code for the Kol language (Cameroon)
- BIW, rail station code for Biggleswade railway station, Biggleswade, Bedfordshire, England, UK
- Bürger in Wut ("Citizens in Rage"), a German political party
- Business is War, a type of Business war games
- Bath Iron Works, a shipyard in Maine, US
- Beloit Iron Works (later Beloit Corporation), a former manufacturing company in Beloit, Wisconsin, US
- Brillion Iron Works, a former manufacturing company in Brillion, Wisconsin, US
- BIW Technologies, a former British software company, now part of Oracle
