= Brillion =

Brillion may refer to:

- Brillion, Wisconsin
- Brillion (town), Wisconsin
- Brillion Iron Works, foundry and farm implement manufacturer
