= American Academy of Achievement =

Non-profit educational organization

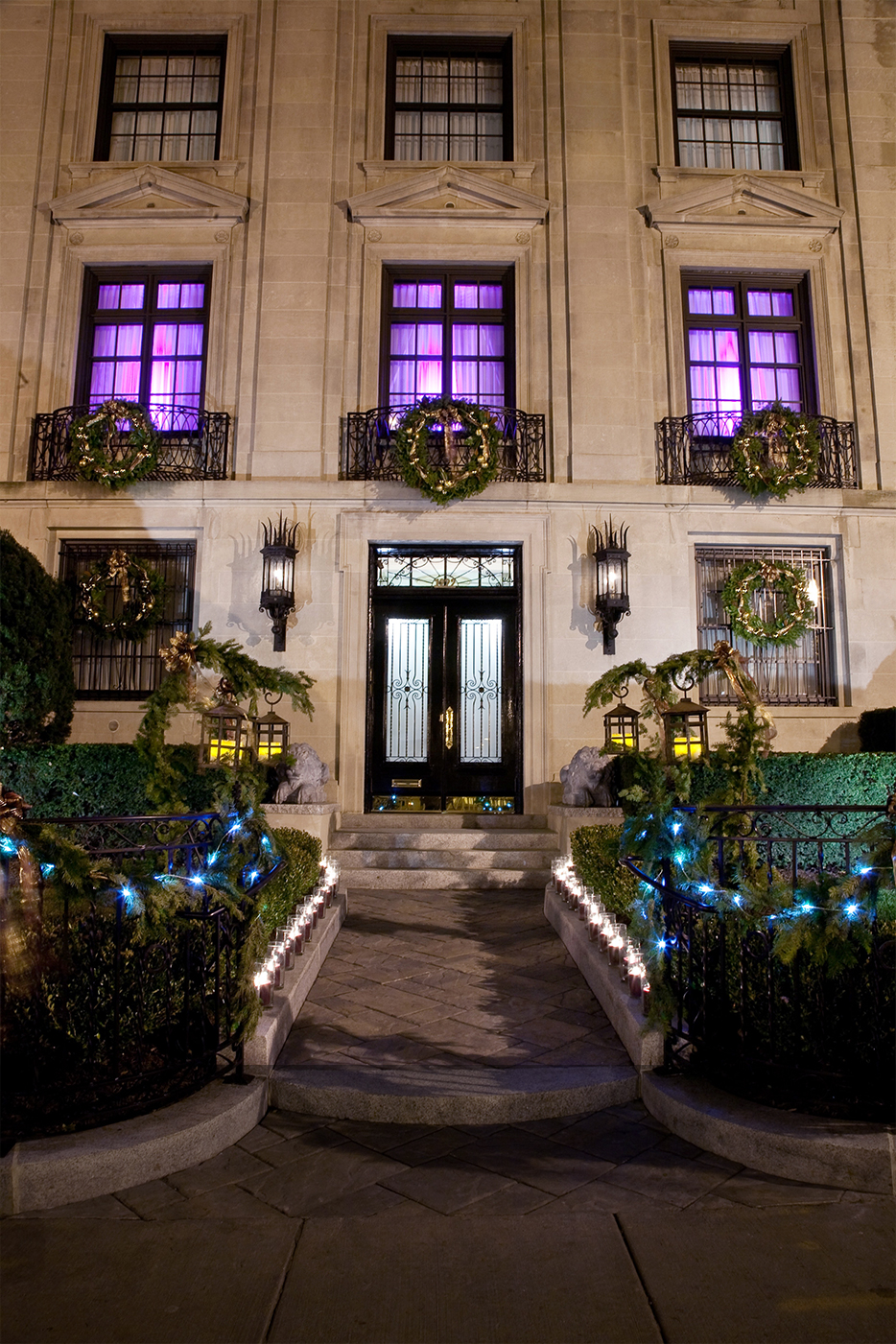
- Formation: 1961
- Type: Nonprofit corporation
- Headquarters: Washington, D.C., U.S.
- Chairman & CEO: Wayne R. Reynolds
- Vice Chairman: Catherine B. Reynolds
- Website: achievement.org

The American Academy of Achievement (colloquially known as the Academy of Achievement) is a nonprofit corporation that recognizes high-achieving people in diverse fields and gives them the opportunity to meet one another. The academy also brings together leaders with promising graduate students for mentorship. It hosts an International Achievement Summit, which ends with an awards ceremony during which new members are inducted.

== History ==
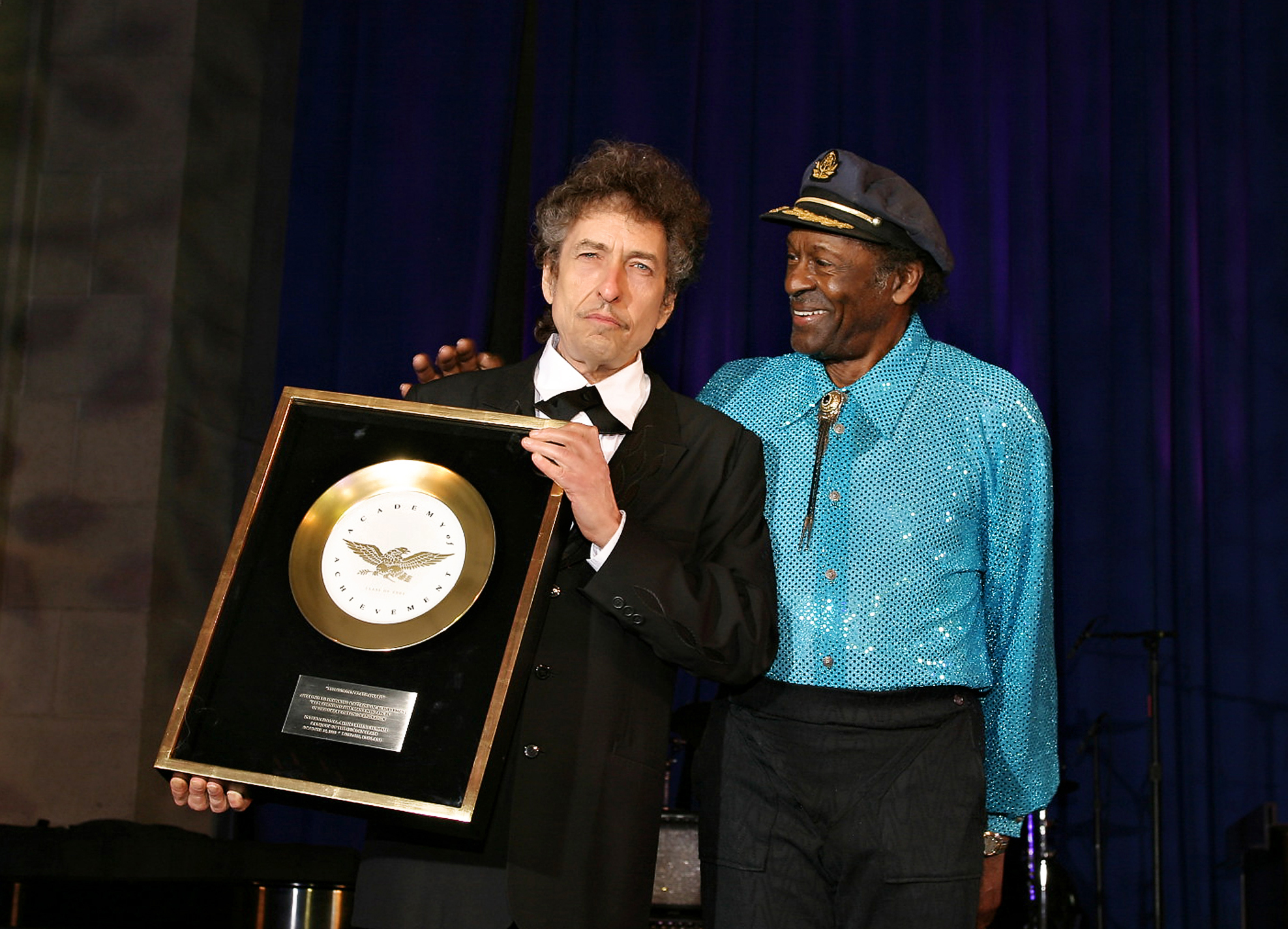
Chuck Berry presenting Golden Plate Award to Bob Dylan - 2003 American Academy of Achievement Summit - DC

Founded in 1961 by Sports Illustrated and LIFE magazine photographer Brian Reynolds, the American Academy of Achievement recognizes high achievers in public service, business, science and exploration, sports, and the arts. Reynolds established the academy to introduce famous people from different fields. A 1989 San Francisco Chronicle article called the organization "little-publicized but immensely powerful". According to William DeVries, who helped develop the first artificial heart, "It is a social network. Like a club. Now I can call Chuck Yeager up, or Philip 'Bo' Knight, and they'll return my calls, ask me out places. I promised myself I would never ask the people here for money, but I know a lot of scientists who do." Reynolds also wanted to bring together leaders and promising students. At the 1990 summit in Chicago, for example, student delegates met Ronald Reagan, Maya Angelou, and Michael Jordan, and in 1995, students met George H. W. Bush, Ruth Bader Ginsburg, Lady Bird Johnson, Robin Williams, Mike Krzyzewski, and Rosa Parks.

Academy members and summit attendees have also included Jimmy Carter, Colin Powell, Maya Lin, Barbra Streisand, Mikhail Gorbachev, Steven Spielberg, and George Lucas. In 2005, The Washington Post called the summit "one of the world's most dazzling gatherings of international celebrities - Nobel Prize winners, heads of state, star athletes, titans of industry, scientists and entertainers."

In 1985, Reynolds's son, Wayne Reynolds, became executive director. In 1999, he was selected as the board chairman. In the 1990s, Reynolds moved the organization's headquarters from Malibu, California, to Washington, D.C. In 2007, the Catherine B. Reynolds Foundation donated $9 million to the academy.

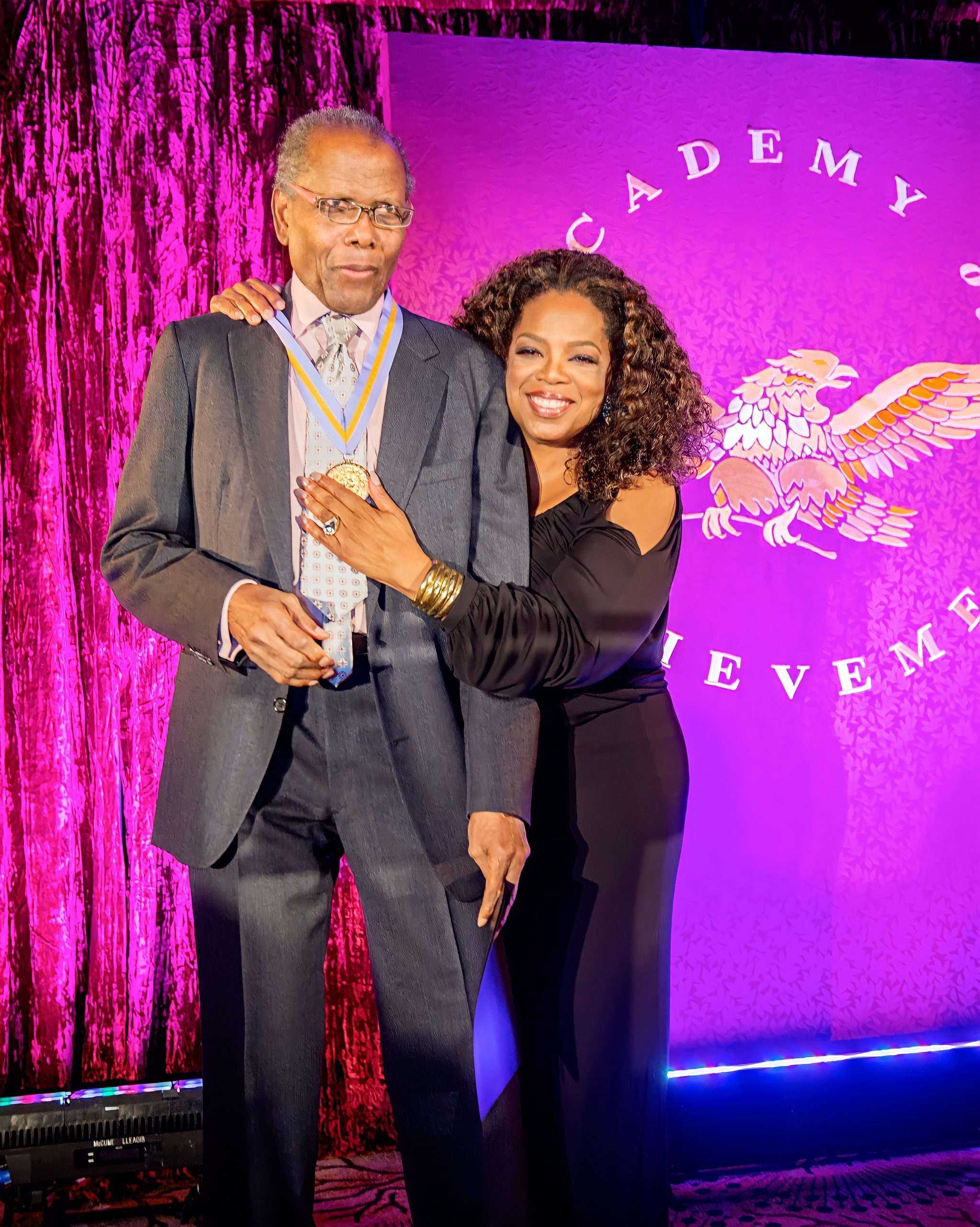
Oprah Winfrey presents Sidney Poitier with the Gold Medal of the American Academy of Achievement in Los Angeles in 2014.

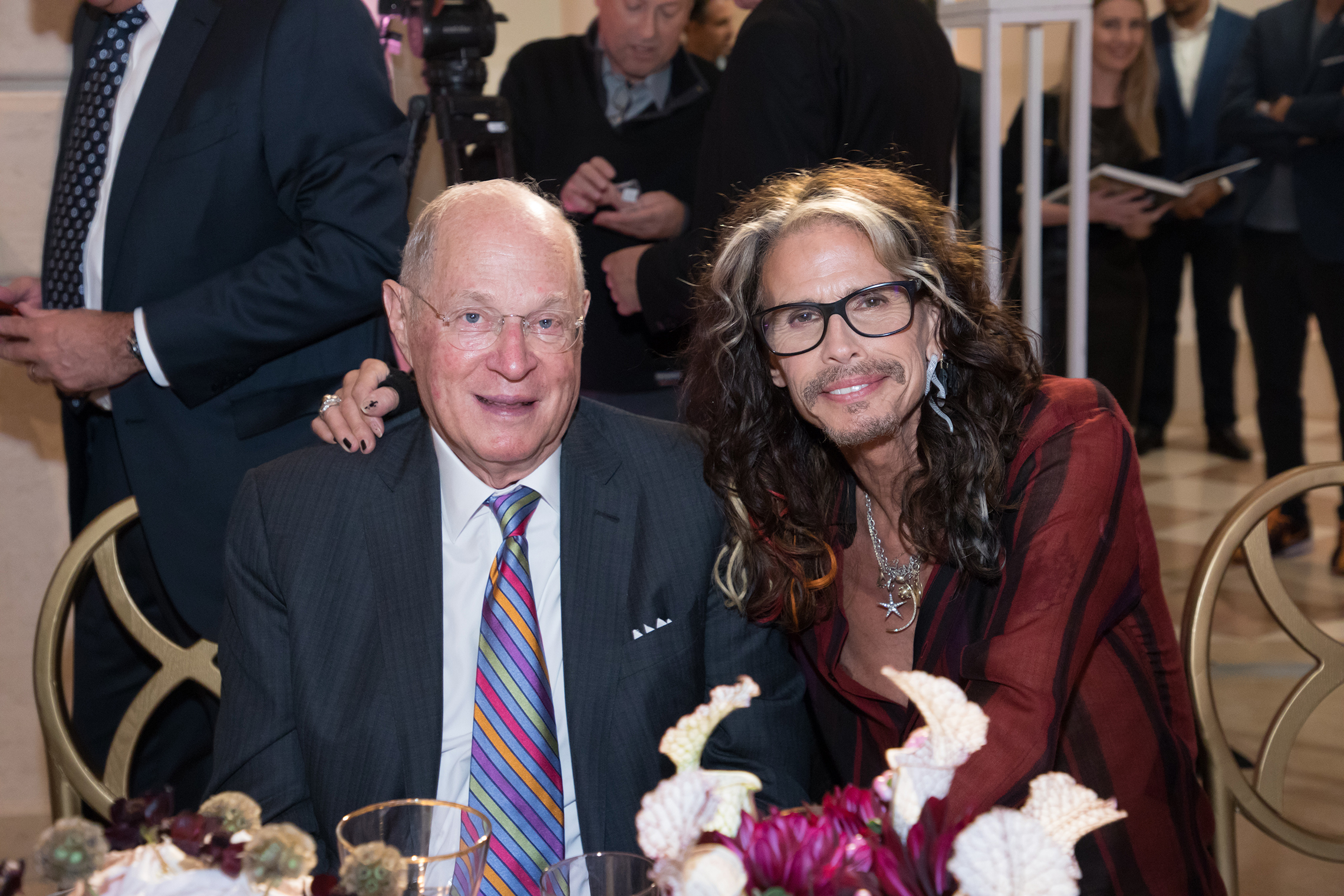
Justice Anthony M. Kennedy and Steven Tyler at dinner at the Metropolitan Museum of Art during the American Academy of Achievement's 2019 International Achievement Summit

=== Achievement summit ===
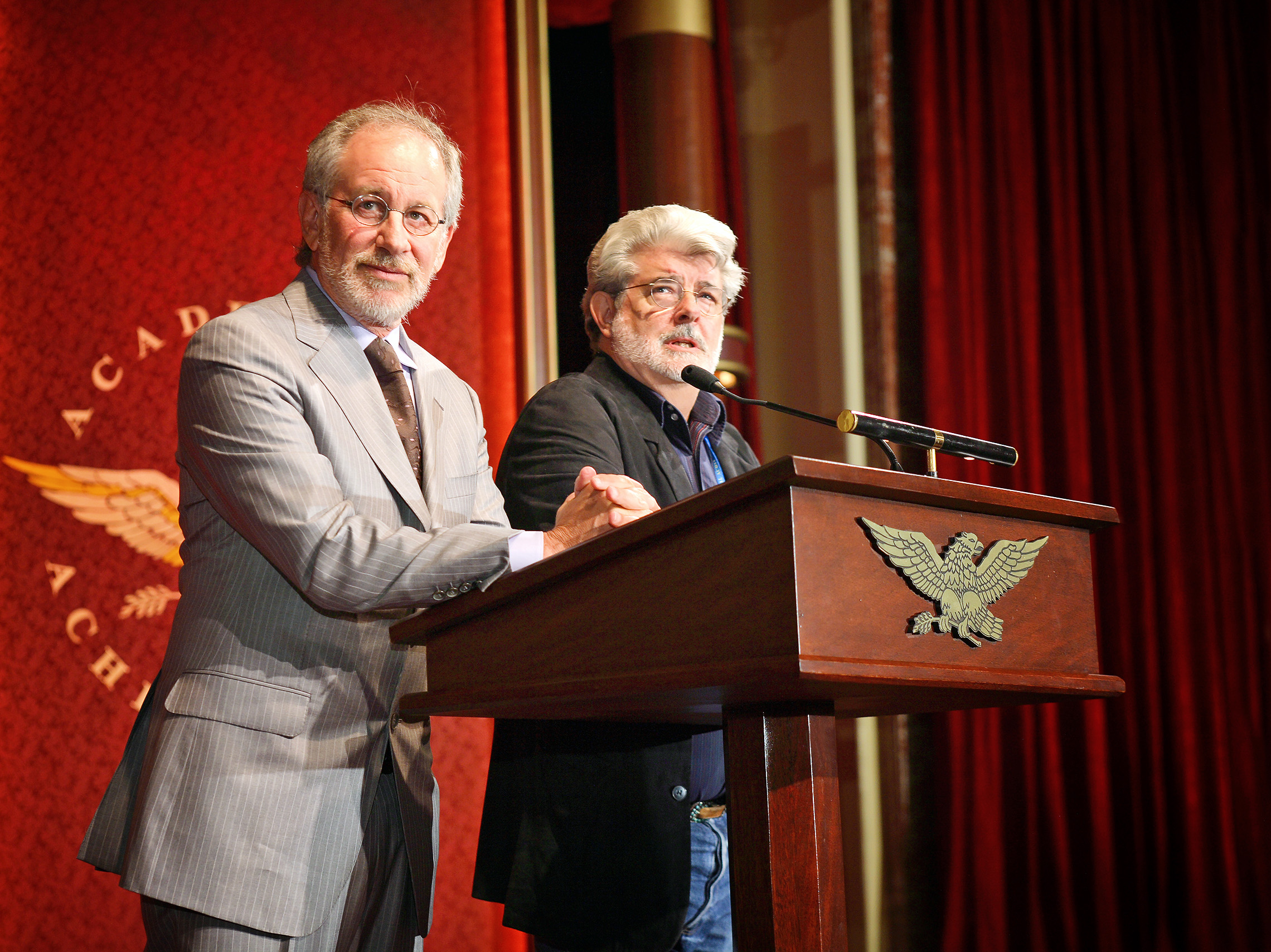
2006 Summit Hosts Steven Spielberg and George Lucas welcome the academy delegates and members to the International Achievement Summit in Los Angeles

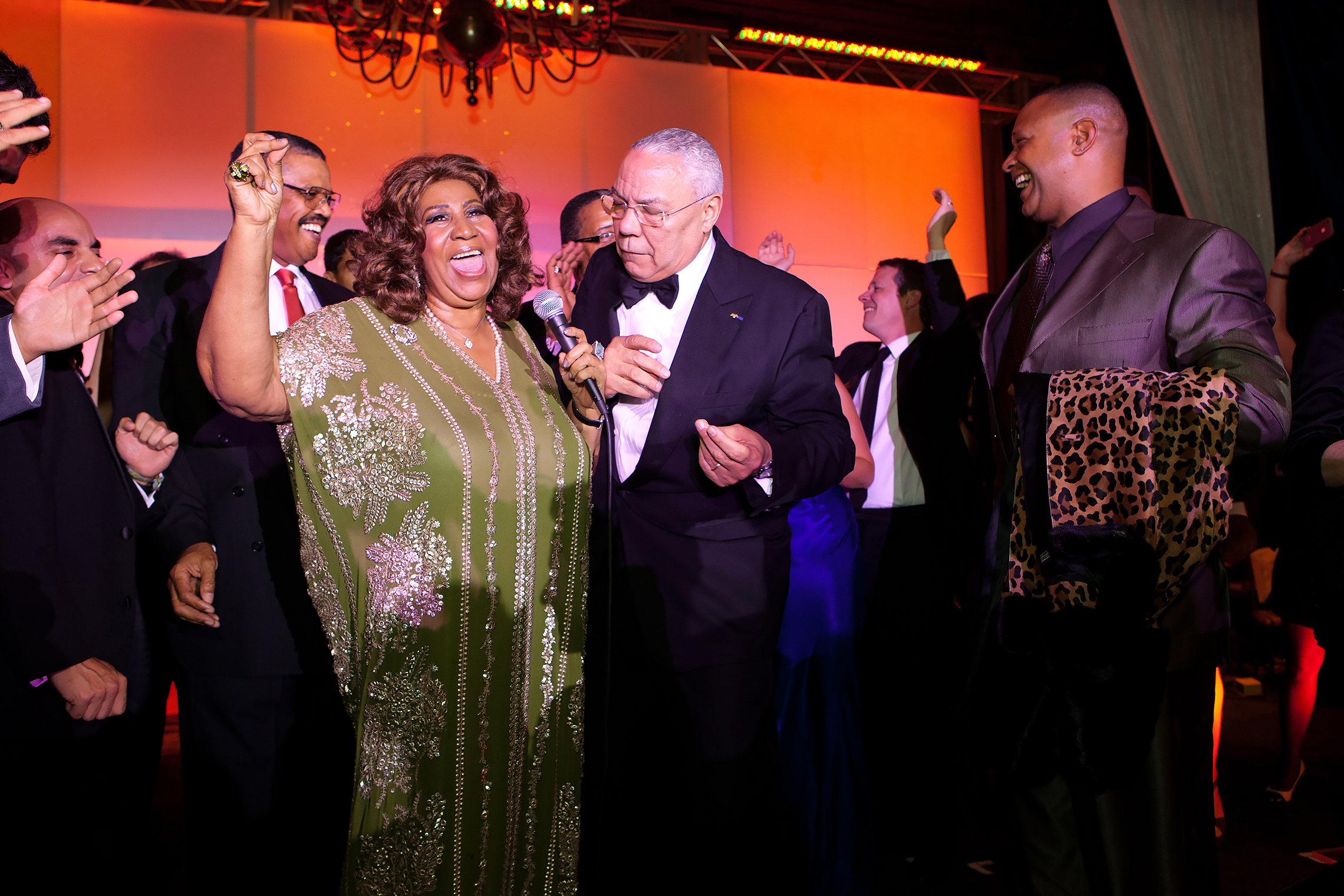
2012 Aretha Franklin is joined onstage by Academy Awards Council member General Colin Powell during her performance to close the evening of the 50th annual Banquet of the Golden Plate ceremonies in Washington, D.C.

The summits were originally attended by high school students chosen for their academic achievement and extracurricular activities, but they are now attended by graduate students and young innovators from the U.S. and overseas. Preceding the awards dinner are three days of panels, presentations, and informal dialogues between the students and inductees. Many inductees return in subsequent years.

In 1961, the academy hosted its first International Achievement Summit. Held in Monterey, California, it included a "Banquet of the Golden Plate" award ceremony, named for the gold-plate service used for special occasions by the Palace Hotel in San Francisco, which provided the service for the ceremony. Physicist Edward Teller was the keynote speaker. Awardees included engineers Charles Stark Draper and Kelly Johnson, General Douglas MacArthur, and film director William Wyler. Other attendees included Nobel laureate Willard Libby (Chemistry, 1960) and future Nobel winner Luis Walter Alvarez (Physics, 1968). The first honorees were chosen by a national board of governors, but subsequent honorees have been selected by the Golden Plate Awards Council, which consists of academy awardees.

At the 13th annual summit, held in 1974 in Salt Lake City, Utah, Academy member Leon Jaworski, the Special Prosecutor overseeing the Watergate investigations at the time, gave the keynote address. Among the awardees were actor James Stewart, athlete John Havlicek, and chemist Paul Flory.

The 25th annual American Academy of Achievement Summit took place in 1986 in Washington, D.C. The ceremony was addressed by former inductees Chuck Yeager and Erma Bombeck, and was attended by a group of 390 high school graduates assembled from across the U.S. New members admitted to the academy at the event included boxer Muhammad Ali, filmmaker Steven Spielberg, Nobel laureate Isidor Isaac Rabi, opera singer Leontyne Price, and country singer Loretta Lynn,

The 2002 summit was held in Dublin, Ireland, and was hosted by then-Taoiseach (prime minister) and inductee Bertie Ahern. Former President Bill Clinton held private talks during the summit with Irish nationalist politician John Hume. Inductees included Clinton, U2 lead singer Bono, and Afghan president Hamid Karzai.

The 50th summit was held in Washington D.C., in 2012. The five-day event included a dinner at the Supreme Court of the United States, which four of the justices attended. Newly inducted academy members who spoke at the meeting included then-United States Secretary of Defense Leon Panetta and Nobel laureates Roger Tsien and Adam Riess. Ray Dalio received the Golden Plate Award of Academy.

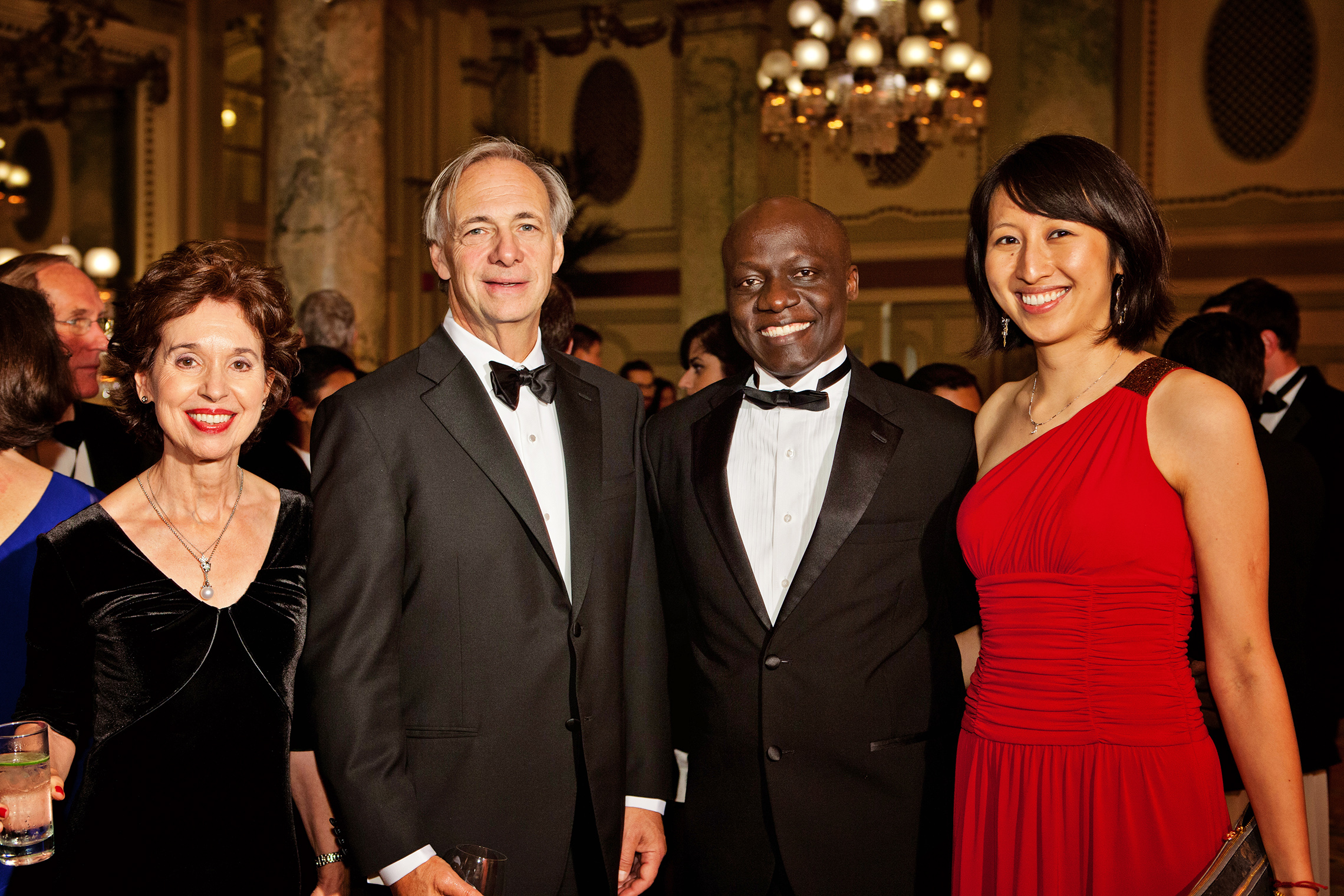
Ray Dalio at the International Achievement Summit's 2012 Banquet of the Golden Plate reception in Washington, D.C., with his wife, Barbara, and two American Academy of Achievement student delegates, Philip Thigo of Kenya and Julia Fan Li of Canada.

The 2021 awards ceremony took place in Los Angeles on December 23. Among the awardees was biochemist Katalin Karikó, whose research with Drew Weissman underpins the mRNA COVID-19 vaccines.

At the 2024 summit, Ukrainian President Volodymyr Zelenskyy received a Golden Plate award and gave an address. Other awardees included Kenyan track and field athletes Faith Kipyegon and Beatrice Chebet.

=== Notable recipients of the Golden Plate Award ===
Recipient	Category	Year inducted	Notes
Hank Aaron	Sports	1977	
Kareem Abdul-Jabbar	Sports	1989	
Muhammad Ali	Sports	1986	
Neil Armstrong	Science & Exploration	1973	
Amy Coney Barrett	Public Service	2022	
Stephen D. Bechtel Sr.	Business	1976	
Jeff Bezos	Business	2001	
Simone Biles	Sports	2017	
Sergey Brin	Business	2004	
Bear Bryant	Sports	1979	
Barbara Bush	Public Service	1997	
George HW Bush	Public Service	1995	
Laura Bush	Public Service	2007	
Ben Carson	Science & Exploration	1995	
Jimmy Carter	Public Service	1984	
Ray Charles	The Arts	1975	
Bill Clinton	Public Service	2002	
Hillary Clinton	Public Service	2003	
Francis Crick	Science & Exploration	1987	
Joan Didion	The Arts	2006	
Bob Dylan	The Arts	2003	
Clint Eastwood	The Arts	1980	
Larry Ellison	Business	1997	
Julius Erving	Sports	1988	
Henry Fonda	The Arts	1979	
Betty Ford	Public Service	1985	
Gerald Ford	Public Service	1971	
Aretha Franklin	The Arts	1999	
Bill Gates	Business	1992	
Ruth Bader Ginsburg	Public Service	1995	
Jane Goodall	Science & Exploration	1987	
Mikhail Gorbachev	Public Service	2000	
Wayne Gretzky	Sports	1982	
Alex Haley	The Arts	1977	
Jim Henson	The Arts	1987	
Audrey Hepburn	The Arts	1991	
Sir Edmund Hillary	Science & Exploration	1973	
Grace Murray Hopper	Science & Exploration	1983	
Kazuo Ishiguro	The Arts	2017	
Ketanji Brown Jackson	Public Service	2022	
Steve Jobs	Business	1982	
Lady Bird Johnson	Public Service	1995	
Quincy Jones	The Arts	1984	
Michael Jordan	Sports	1990	
Anthony M. Kennedy	Public Service	2005	
Jack Kilby	Business	1970	
Coretta Scott King	Public Service	1997	
Henry Kissinger	Public Service	2002	
Phil Knight	Business	1989	
Ralph Lauren	Business	1989	
Richard Leakey	Science & Exploration	2007	
Katie Ledecky	Sports	2024	
John Lewis	Public Service	2004	
George Lucas	The Arts	1989	
Douglas MacArthur	Public.Service	1961	
John D. MacArthur	Business	1977	
Mickey Mantle	Sports	1969	
Willie Mays	Sports	1975	
Toni Morrison	The Arts	2005	
Tenzing Norgay	Science & Exploration	1973	
Barack Obama	Public Service	2007	
Sandra Day O’Connor	Public Service	1987	
Jimmy Page	The Arts	2017	
Larry Page	Business	2004	
Rosa Parks	Public Service	1995	
Dolly Parton	The Arts	1992	
Linus Pauling	Science & Exploration	1979	
Walter Payton	Sports	1988	
Shimon Peres	Public Service	2003	
Itzhak Perlman	The Arts	2005	
Wendell Phillips (archaeologist)	Science & Exploration	1972	
Colin Powell	Public Service	1988	
Wallace Rasmussen	Business	1977	
Ronald Reagan	Public Service	1990	
David Robinson	Sports	1987	
Bill Russell	Sports	2008	
Carl Sagan	Science & Exploration	1975	
Jonas Salk	Science & Exploration	1976	
Norman Schwarzkopf	Public Service	1991	
Martin Scorsese	The Arts	1991	
Stephen Sondheim	The Arts	2005	
Steven Spielberg	The Arts	1986	
Sonia Sotomayor	Public Service	2012	
Elizabeth Taylor	The Arts	1985	
Wayne Thiebaud	The Arts	1987	
Desmond Tutu	Public Service	2003	
John Wayne	The Arts	1970	
Elie Wiesel	Public Service	1996	
Oprah Winfrey	Business	1989	
Henry Winkler	The Arts	1980	
John Wooden	Sports	1976	
Stevie Wonder	The Arts	1977	
Volodymyr Zelenskyy	Public service	2024	
Vladimir K. Zworykin	Science & Exploration	1967	
