= Accuride International =

American drawer slide manufacturer

Accuride International Inc.
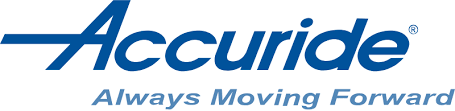
- Type: Private
- Industry: Furniture hardware
- Founded: 1962
- Headquarters: Santa Fe Springs, California, United States
- Number of employees: ~2000
- Website: www.accuride.com

Accuride Corporation (Indiana), an unrelated company, is a manufacturer of vehicle wheels.

Accuride International Inc. is a manufacturer of commercial-grade drawer slides, linear track systems, and electronic locking solutions for cabinetry in commercial, residential and industrial applications, based in Santa Fe Springs, California and has about 2000 employees.

Accuride components can be found in major appliances, electronic enclosures, automobiles, office and residential fixtures, and industrial hardware. Accuride currently holds nearly 400 enforceable patents related to movement and access control solutions worldwide. The company is headquartered in Santa Fe Springs, Calif., and has manufacturing facilities in North America, Europe, and Asia.

Accuride has about 1,000,000 square feet of manufacturing space in China, Germany, Japan, Mexico, the UK, and the US. Its manufacturing plant in Charlotte, North Carolina, United States closed in 2001.

== History ==
Fred Jordan founded Accuride in South Gate, California in 1962. and began as a small tool and die shop founded by Fred Jordan in 1962 in South Gate, California. The company produced slides for tape drives and copy machines.

Amid steady growth, the company moved to a larger facility in Santa Fe Springs four years later. Accuride expanded its manufacturing to sites in Germany, Japan, and the United Kingdom in 1970s. By 2006, Accuride had expanded production to Mexico and China.

== Products ==
Accuride is best known for its large array of premium-grade drawer slides that support applications anywhere from 35 to 1,323 pounds.

The Model 3832, a medium-duty side-mount slide, remains one of the most popular and most replicated slides on the market. The present 3800 family comes in many variants, such as Touch Release, Easy-Close, and Over-Travel. The 9300, a family of heavy-duty slides, is another popular model commonly found in factories and commercial transportation.

Accuride has since expanded into linear track systems, such as those used on Britain’s Alder Hey Children’s Hospital.

It has also expanded into cabinet-level RFID electronic access control (EAC) under Senseon Secure Access. The latter has been used in premium retail, upscale residences, and healthcare facilities.
