= Grupo Kalise =

Ice cream and dessert manufacturing company

Kalise
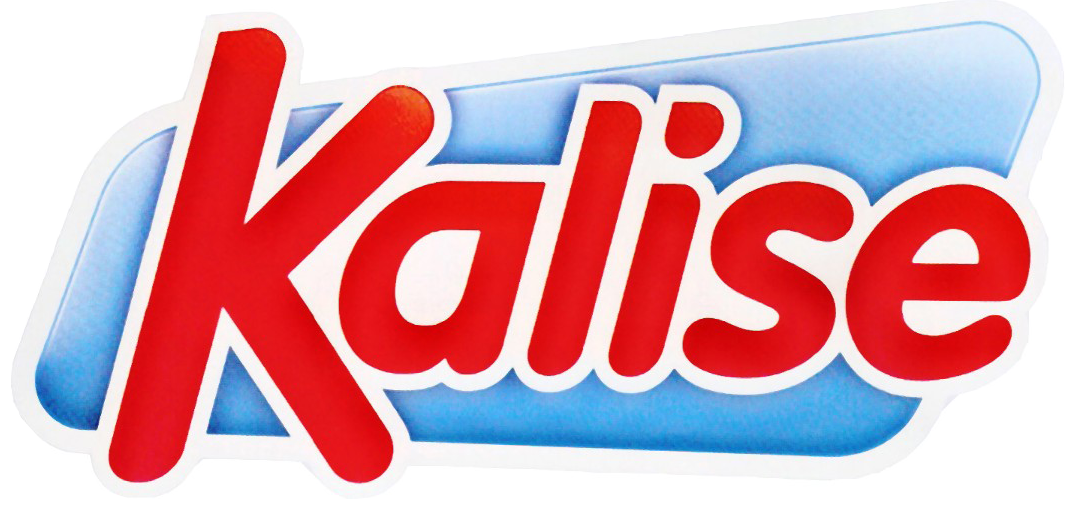
- Company type: subsidiary
- Industry: Dairy
- Founded: 1960; 66 years ago
- Headquarters: Las Palmas, Spain
- Products: Ice creams, Frozen desserts, yogurts
- Parent: Grupo Farga
- Website: kalise.com

Kalise is a Spanish ice cream and dessert manufacturing company, established in 1960 and based on Las Palmas de Gran Canaria in the Canary Islands. The company was part of the "Grupo Kalise–La Menorquina S.A.", after merging with another ice cream company of Spain, La Menorquina. During that partnership, Kalise commercialised its products for public sale, while La Menorquina focused on the restaurant trade.

In 2017, both companies separated again when the GKM was acquired by Grupo Farga for EU 40 million. Since then, Kalise has remained as a separate company.

== History ==
Following the World War II, businessman Fernando Pons Sintes founded "La Estrella" in 1950 on the island of Menorca, with the vision of taking ice cream and cake to the island's restaurants. Five years later in 1955, the company would be renamed from La Estrella, to "La Menorquina". By the mid-1950s, the company reached collaboration agreements with companies in Barcelona. In 1956, Sintes acquired the Mahon-based chocolate company La Tropical de Mahón, founded in 1883 and in which Sintes had worked as a baking apprentice.

In 1960, ice cream still remained a luxurious product, though the development of tourism and restaurants meant greater access to refrigerators, helping Sintes and La Menorquina gain presence on the islands. By the mid-1960s, increased competition attempting to capitalise on the tourism boost forced La Menorquina to evolve. The company purchased Helados Marisa, which would later merge with US multinational company Beatrice Foods, which bought a 95% stake of the company in 1965.

Beatrice Foods would later go on to also buy stakes in a company called Marisa (Modernas Aplicaciones de la Refrigeracion Industrial), who owned refrigeration factories in Barcelona and Mallorca. This meant that La Menorquina could begin to sell its products in Mallorca and at a greater scale. La Menorquina marketed three brands in Mallorca, these were La Menorquina, Matisa and Calatayud. In 1983, Marisa merged with La Menorquina, leaving the Barcelona, Menorca and Mallorca factories exclusively to La Menorquina, allowing for expansion of operations.

During the early 1960s in the city of Las Palmas on the island of Gran Canaria, businessman Delfín Suárez saw tourism opportunities, and made the family company Interglas manufacture and market their ice cream, trading as Kalise.

In 1990, Sintes retired, and now-Interglas owner Suárez purchased all shares of La Menorquina. Despite this, La Menorquina and Kalise remained separate companies. La Menorquina began its internationalisation by exporting its products to 27 countries. Later on 1999, Beatrice Foods left the company, which allowed Interglas to fully merge with La Menorquina, resulting in the Kalise Menorquina Group. At this time it becomes the first national manufacturer with entirely Canarian capital.

In 2005, the GKM acquired 95% of SIALSA, which produced and sold yogurt-brand "Sandra" locally. In 2017, the GKM was acquired by Grupo Farga for EU 40 million. As a result, Kalise kept its operational base on the Canary Islands producing its lines of ice creams and yogurts, while La Menorquina commercialised its lines along with the brand "Farggi". In this year, Grupo La Menorquina disbanded, forming Grupo Kalise S.A.
