= Rusty =

Rusty may refer to something covered with rust or with a rust (color). Rusty is also a nickname for people who have red hair, have a rust-hued skin tone, or have the given name Russell.

Rusty may also refer to:

- Rusty (given name), a given name

== Arts and entertainment ==
=== Fictional characters ===
- Rusty, a sidekick of Big Guy from The Big Guy and Rusty the Boy Robot, a 1995 comic book
- "Rusty", the Good Dalek, in the Doctor Who episode "Into the Dalek"
- Rusty, a locomotive in the British children's book series The Railway Series and television series Thomas & Friends
- Rusty the Steam Engine, in the musical Starlight Express
- Russell "Rusty" Beck, in the American television series Major Crimes
- Finbarr "Rusty" Galloway, Cole Phelps' partner at the homicide desk in the video game L.A. Noire
- Russell "Rusty" Griswold, in the National Lampoon's Vacation films
- Rusty Rivets, a Canadian television series
- Doctor Thaddeus Venture, nicknamed "Rusty", in the television series The Venture Bros.
- Corporal Rusty "B Company" fictional character in The Adventures of Rin Tin Tin television series, portrayed by Lee Aaker
- Rusty, a character in Bluey
- Rusty (Armored Core VI) or V.IV Rusty, a mech pilot from the video game Armored Core VI: Fires of Rubicon

=== Music ===
- Rusty (band), a Canadian alternative rock band in the 1990s
- Rusty (Rodan album), a 1994 indie rock album by Rodan
- Rusty (Slick Shoes album), a 1997 pop punk album by Slick Shoes
- "Rusty", a song by The Dismemberment Plan from the album !
- "Rusty", a song by Tyler, the Creator from the album Wolf

=== Other arts and entertainment ===
- Rusty (film series), 1940s children's film series featuring a German Shepherd dog named Rusty
- Rusty (video game), 1993 action video game

== Sports ==
- Rusty Australia, a surfboard and surfwear brand
