= Martha White =

Brand of foods

Martha White is an American brand of flour, cornmeal, cornbread mixes, cake mixes, muffin mixes, and similar products.

The Martha White brand was established as the premium brand of Nashville, Tennessee-based Royal Flour Mills in 1899. At that time, Nashville businessman Richard Lindsey introduced a fine flour that he named for his daughter, Martha White Lindsey.

The Martha White brand is probably most associated with its long-term sponsorship of the Grand Ole Opry, a radio program featuring country music. The relationship began in 1948, and has existed continuously since then, making it one of the longest continually running radio show sponsorships known.

A jingle for the flour, written by the Carter Sisters and Mother Maybelle in 1950, was the first Martha White Jingle. The Carter girls also wrote a jingle for Martha White Coffee Time an early morning radio program in 1951 that Martha White sponsored. Nashville songwriter Pat Twitty wrote a jingle in 1953, and was performed from the stage of the Grand Ole Opry by bluegrass music artists Flatt and Scruggs. It is still in use today, having become a bluegrass standard and a signature number of Rhonda Vincent and the Rage. In 1972, Tennessee Ernie Ford became the spokesman for the flour, with the catchphrase, "Goodness gracious, it's pea-pickin' good!"

Packaging for Martha White ingredients (flour, cornmeal) features the likeness of three-year-old Martha White. The commercials for the products stress the fact that they are "self-rising" due to the presence of leavening known by trademarks "Hot-Rize" or "Hot-Rize Plus". Martha White has expanded its product offering beyond ingredients to include baking mixes.

Martha White merged with Beatrice Foods in 1975. In 1986, Beatrice, newly acquired by Kohlberg Kravis Roberts, spun off its specialty foods and nonfood brands as E-II Holdings. E-II attempted to take over American Brands in 1988, but instead American Brands purchased E-II. Martha White was sold off in 1989.

Martha White was purchased by the Pillsbury Company in 1994; the baking products of Pillsbury were spun off in 2001 under the name International Multifoods. The J.M. Smucker Company acquired International Multifoods in 2004. It was sold to Hometown Food, a division of Brynwood Partners, in 2018.
