= United Community Bank =

Bank holding company

United Community Banks, Inc.
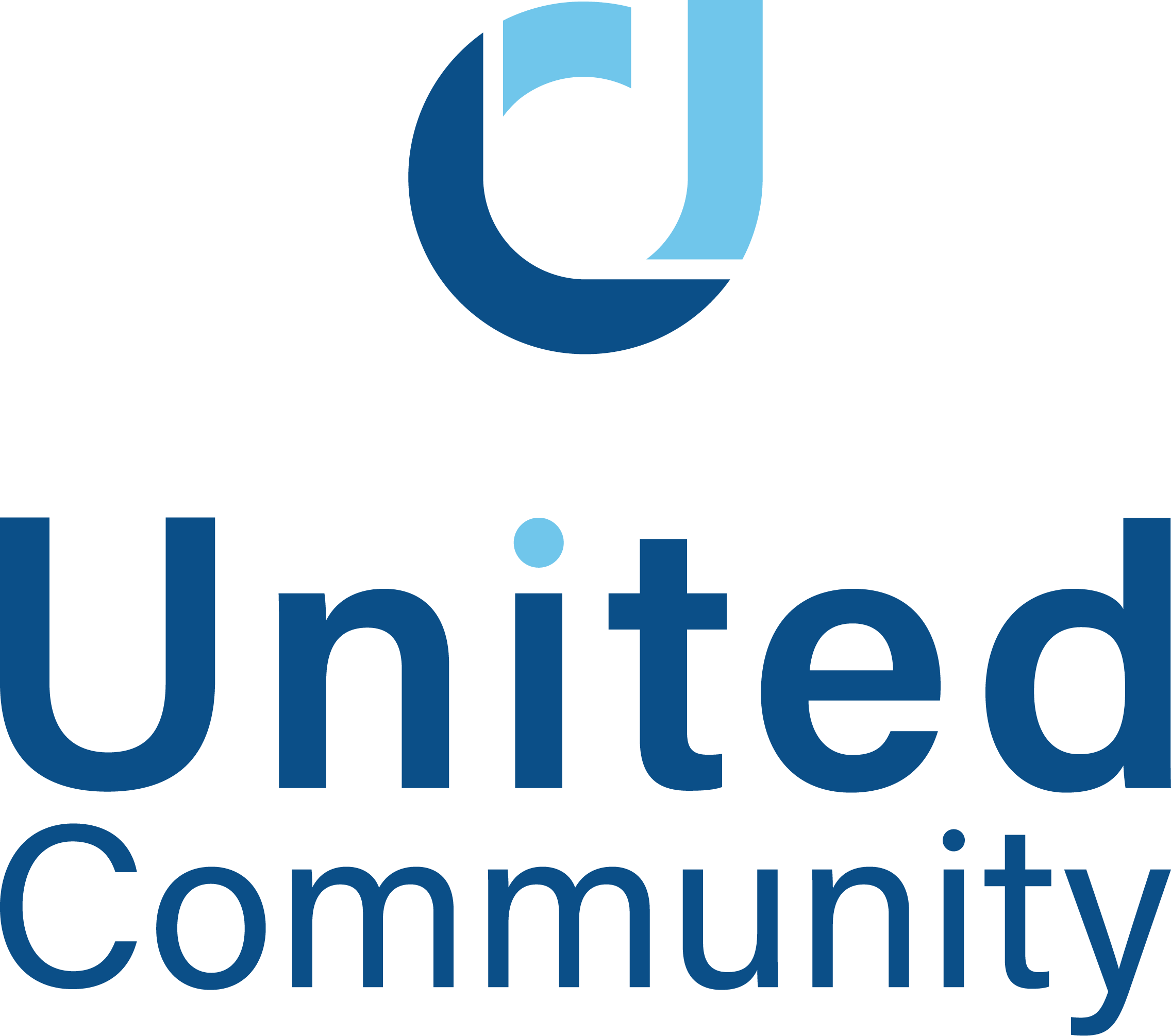

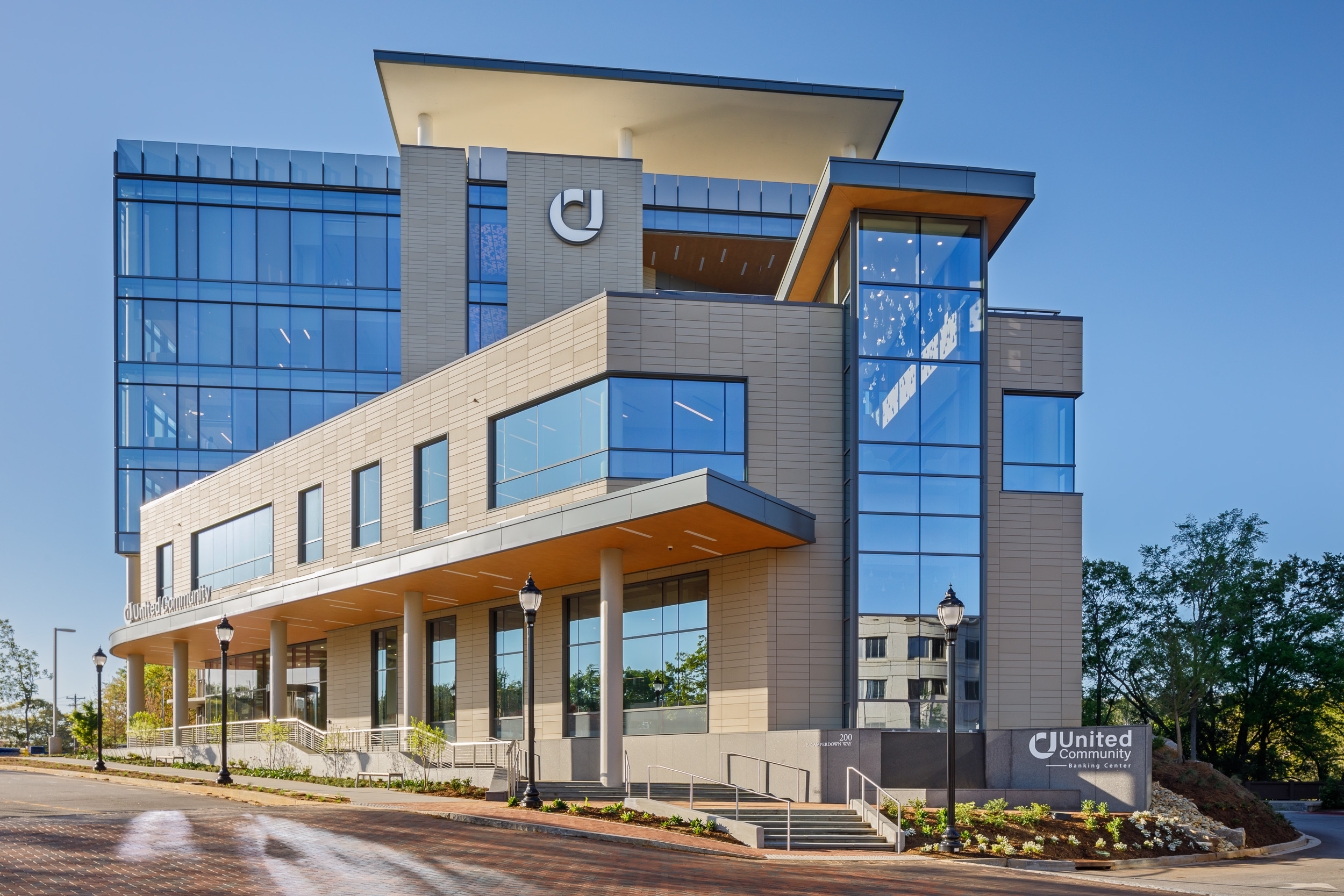
- United Community Headquarters in Greenville, SC
- Type: Public
- Traded as: NYSE: UCB; S&P 600 component
- Founded: 1950; 76 years ago
- Headquarters: Greenville, South Carolina, United States
- Key people: H. Lynn Harton (CEO)
- Revenue: ▲US$1.06 billion (2025)
- Net income: ▲US$328 million (2025)

United Community is an American bank. United is one of the largest full-service financial institutions in the Southeast, with $28.2 billion in assets and 200 offices in Alabama, Florida, Georgia, North Carolina, South Carolina and Tennessee. In addition to its presence in the Southeast, United Community is the largest bank headquartered in South Carolina by total asset size.

== Products ==
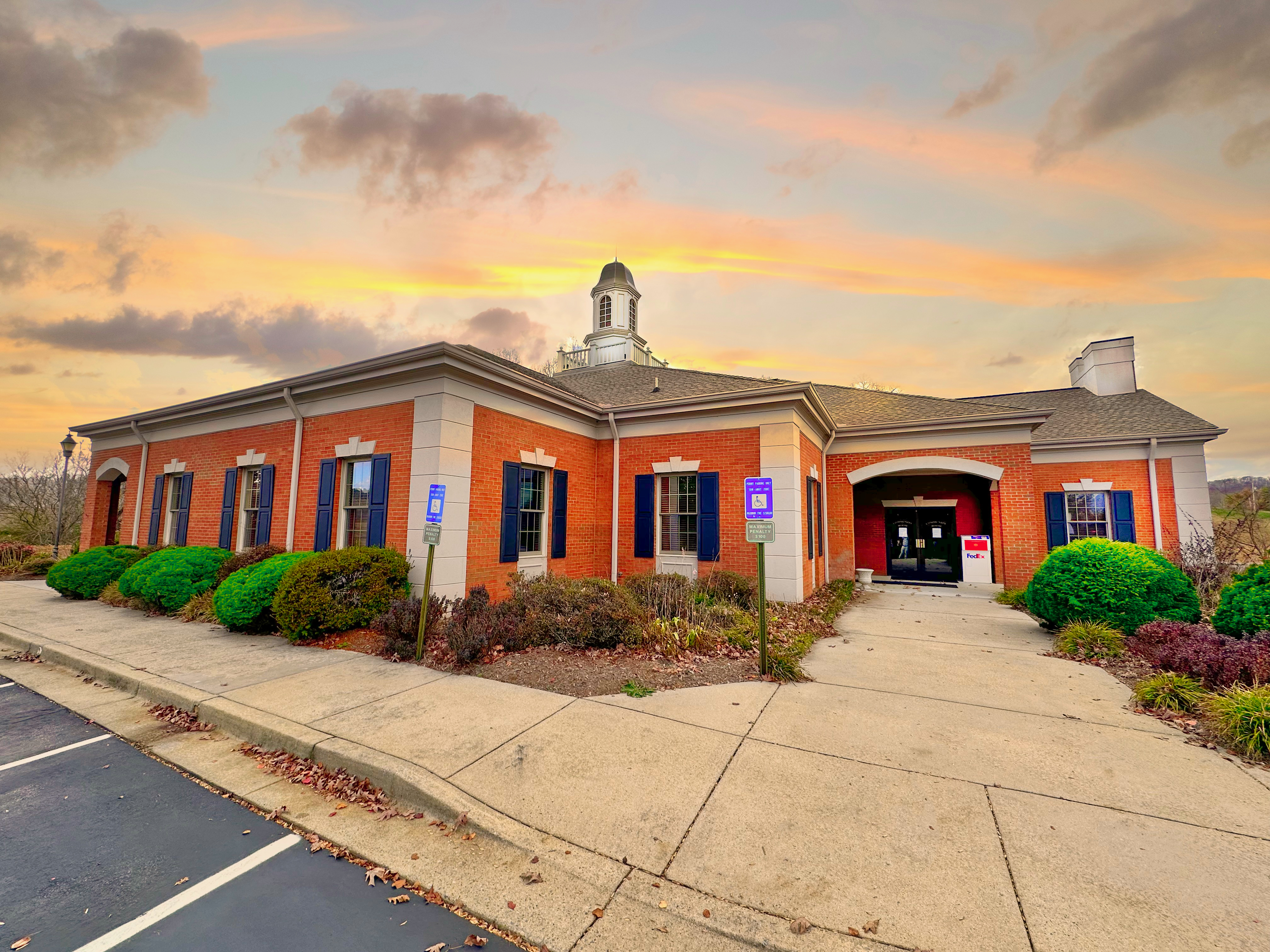
A United Community Bank in Hayesville, North Carolina

United offers a full range of consumer/commercial/corporate banking products including mortgage services, interest-bearing and non interest-bearing deposits, NOW accounts (Negotiable Order of Withdrawal account), money market accounts, checking accounts, savings accounts, and advisory and treasury management services. The bank also offers products suited to commercial and corporate customers through its Corporate/Commercial Banking Group. Other divisions include United Community Private Bank, United Community Wealth Management, United Community SBA Group, and many more. Through its wholly owned subsidiary Navitas Credit Corp., United also offers equipment lending.

== History ==
Union County Bank was founded in 1949 in Blairsville, Georgia. By 1984, the bank had grown to $42 million in assets, and that year Jimmy C. Tallent was appointed president.

United Community Banks, Inc was incorporated as a holding company in 1987. The following year, it acquired Union County Bank, which was later renamed United Community Bank (Georgia) in 1996. During this period, the company expanded its presence through a series of regional acquisitions.

In 1990, it acquired Citizens Bank of Murphy, North Carolina, which became United Community Bank (North Carolina). Additional acquisitions included United Community Bank Towns County in 1992, White County Bank of Cleveland, Georgia, in 1995, and Rabun County Bank in 1997. United Community Bank expanded its North Carolina operations in 1995, adding branches in Andrews, Franklin and Waynesville.

Following changes in Georgia's banking laws, United Community Bank began opening branches in addition to making acquisitions. In 1997, the company acquired the assets of a bank in Cornelia and First Clayton Bank and Trust, further extending its footprint in northern Georgia.

In 1999, UCB acquired Bank of Adairsville parent Adairsville Bancshares for $7.1 million plus additional costs, along with 1st Floyd Bank. Both institutions became part of United Community Bank (Georgia) in 2001.

Expansions continued in 2000 with the acquisitions of North Point Bancshares Inc., Independent Bancshares Inc. and consulting firm Brintech, Inc. That same year, Lendmark Financial Services Inc. purchased the consumer finance division.

United Community Banks, Inc. was listed on the Nasdaq in 2002, marking a major milestone in its growth as a public company.

In 2003, the company acquired First Georgia Holding Inc. for approximately $42 million and added First Central Bank of Lenoir City, Tennessee to its portfolio. By 2004, as assets surpassed $5 billion, United completed additional acquisitions, including Fairbanco Holding Co. for $24.7 million, Eagle National Bank for $12.4 million, and Liberty National Bancshares Inc. for $42.5 million.

United completed its first public stock offering in 2005.

In 2006, the company acquired Southern Bancorp, the parent company of Southern National Bank, in a stock transaction valued at $67.8 million. That same year, United expanded its North Carolina presence by purchasing two Sylva offices from First Charter Bank, bringing its total locations in the state to 19.

The company purchased Gwinnett Commercial Group, parent of First Bank of the South, in 2007 for $222.9 million, and acquired the assets and most liabilities of Southern Community Bank, with the Federal Deposit Insurance Corp providing $31 million in support of the deal.

Between 2014 and 2020, United undertook a period of significant expansion, acquiring several financial institutions across the Southeast. Major acquisitions during this period included:

- 2014: Acquisition of Business Carolina Inc. for $31.3 million.
- 2015: Acquisition of MoneyTree Corporation and its wholly owned bank subsidiary, First National Bank, of Lenoir City, Tennessee.
- 2015: Merger with Palmetto Bancshares, Inc., expanding the bank’s South Carolina presence.
- 2017: Acquisition of Four Oaks Fincorp of North Carolina in a $124 million deal adding 14 branches and an additional $737 million in assets.
- 2018: Acquisition of NLFC Holdings Corp. and its wholly owned subsidiary Navitas Credit Corp. for $130 million, entering the equipment finance sector.
- 2020: Acquisition of Three Shores Bancorporation and its wholly owned subsidiary, Seaside Bank and Trust, expanding into the Florida market with 14 locations.

In January 2021, United announced plans to relocate its corporate headquarters to downtown Greenville, South Carolina, with the construction of a new $65 million building. Later that year, the company expanded further in North Carolina with the acquisition of Aquesta Financial Holdings Inc., completed in October for $131 million in a cash-and-stock transaction. This acquisition brought the company’s total assets to approximately $18.6 billion.

In early 2022, United completed a merger with Reliant Bancorp in Tennessee, followed by another with Progress Bank & Trust of Huntsville, Alabama, later that year.

In April 2024, United Community officially opened its new corporate headquarters in Greenville, South Carolina. The 200,000-square-foot facility, known as United Center, houses over 300 employees. The building earned the distinction of being South Carolina’s first WELL Certified structure for its emphasis on employee health and well-being.

In 2025, the company finalized the acquisition of ANB Holdings, Inc., the parent company of American National Bank, based in Oakland Park, Florida, an all-stock transaction valued at approximately $80 million.
