= Beatrice Foods =

Food conglomerate

Beatrice Foods Company
- Type: Public
- Traded as: NYSE: BF
- Industry: Consumer goods
- Founded: 1894; 132 years ago
- Founders: George Everett Haskell; William W. Bosworth
- Defunct: 1990 (in the U.S.)
- Fate: Acquired by Conagra Brands
- Successor: Conagra Brands
- Headquarters: Irvine, California, U.S. Downers Grove, Illinois, U.S. Chicago, Illinois, U.S.
- Key people: Wallace Rasmussen (chairman & CEO, 1976-1980)
- Products: Food; Chemical; Consumer Products
- Brands: Tropicana; Krispy Kreme; Dannon
- Revenue: US$4 billion (1975)
- Net income: US$206 million (1976)
- Number of employees: 64,000 (1975)

Beatrice Foods Company was a major American conglomerate founded in 1894. One of the best-known food processing companies in the U.S., Beatrice owned many well-known brands such as Tropicana, Krispy Kreme, Jolly Rancher, Orville Redenbacher's, Swiss Miss, Peter Pan, Milk Duds, La Choy and Dannon. It also owned several chemical and consumer goods companies in the 1980s, such as as Avis, Samsonite and Playtex.

Beatrice was a Fortune 500 company, appearing on the list multiple times and establishing itself as a significant presence on the list during the mid-20th century.

In 1987, its international food operations were sold to Reginald Lewis, a corporate attorney, creating TLC Beatrice International, after which the majority of its domestic (U.S.) brands and assets were acquired by Kohlberg Kravis Roberts, with the bulk of its holdings sold off. By 1990, the remaining operations were ultimately acquired by ConAgra Foods.

== History ==
=== Early years ===
==== 1894-1912 ====
The Beatrice Creamery Company was founded in 1894 by George Everett Haskell and William W. Bosworth, by leasing the factory of a bankrupt firm of the same name located in Beatrice, Nebraska. At the time, they purchased butter, milk, and eggs from local farmers and graded them for resale. They promptly began separating the butter themselves at their plant, making their own butter on site and packaging and distributing it under their own label. They devised special protective packages and distributed them to grocery stores and restaurants in their own wagons and through jobbers. To overcome the shortage of cream, the partners established skimming stations to which farmers delivered their milk to have the cream, used to make butter, separated from the milk. This led to the introduction of their unique credit program of providing farmers with cream separators so they could separate the milk on the farm and retain the skim milk for animal food. This enabled farmers to pay for the separators from the proceeds of their sales of cream. The program worked so well, the company sold more than 50,000 separators in Nebraska from 1895 to 1905. On March 1, 1905, the company was incorporated as the Beatrice Creamery Company of Iowa, with capital of $3,000,000. By the early 20th century, they were shipping dairy products across the United States, and by 1910 they operated nine creameries and three ice cream plants across the Great Plains.

==== 1913-1955 ====
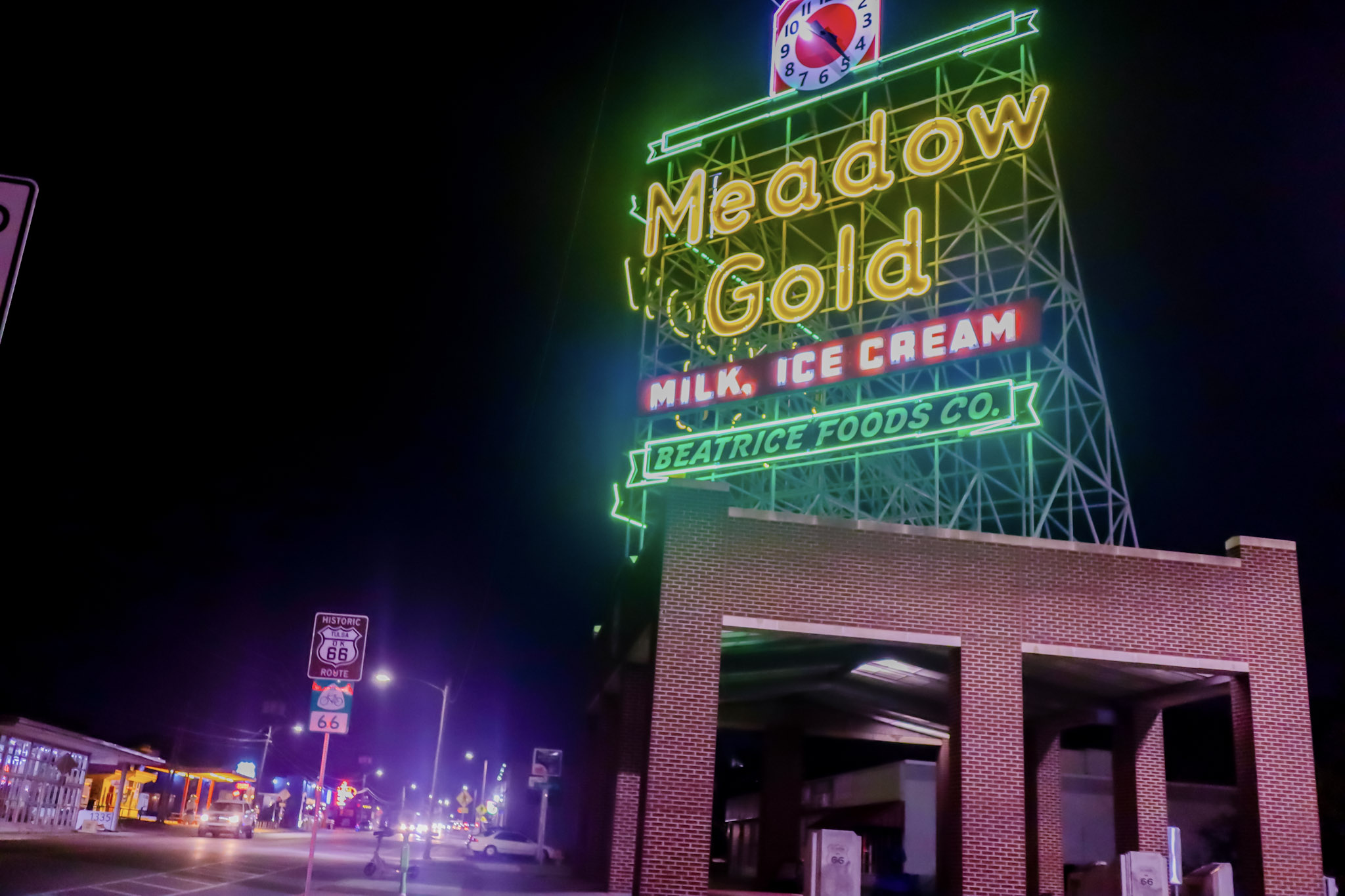
Restored Beatrice Foods Meadow Gold ice cream neon sign on Route 66 in Tulsa, Oklahoma.

In 1913 the company moved to Chicago, the center of the American food processing industry. By the 1930s, it was a major dairy company, producing some 30 million US gallons (110,000,000 L) of milk and 10 million US gallons (38,000,000 L) of ice cream annually. In 1939, Beatrice Creamery Company purchased Blue Valley Creamery Company, the other Chicago-based dairy centralizer. This acquisition added at least 11 creameries from New York to South Dakota. Beatrice's 'Meadow Gold' brand was a household name in much of America by the beginning of World War II. In 1946, it changed its name to Beatrice Foods Co. Their sales doubled between 1945 and 1955, as the post-war baby boom created greater demand for milk products.

=== Major expansion years ===
==== Canada ====
From the late 1950s until the early 1970s, the company expanded into Canada and purchased a number of other food firms, leveraging its distribution network to profit from a more diverse array of food and consumer products. It became the owner of brands such as Avis Car Rental, Playtex, Shedd's, Tropicana, John Sexton & Co, Good & Plenty, and many others. Annual sales in 1984 were roughly $12 billion.

Beatrice's Canadian subsidiary, Beatrice Foods Canada, was founded in 1969 and became legally separate from its parent firm in 1978.

==== 1955-1975 ====
In 1968, Sexton Foods was approached by Beatrice with an offer to purchase John Sexton & Co. Beatrice was attracted to Sexton Quality Foods' distribution network, quality, variety of private-label products, specialized food offerings, sales force and profitability. Mack Sexton's initial response was no, but Beatrice Foods was very interested. Eventually both parties reached an agreement. Beatrice Foods increased the purchase price, pledged capital to expand Sexton Quality Foods' distribution network and introduce a new Sexton frozen product line, and pledged that the Sexton leadership would continue to lead and operate the company as a separate entity. On December 20, 1968, Beatrice acquired the business and assets of John Sexton & Co., exchanging about 375,000 shares of Beatrice's preferred convertible preference stock valued at $37,500,000. John Sexton & Co. became an independent division of Beatrice Foods, led by Mack Sexton (son of Franklin), William Egan (son of Helen), and William Sexton (son of Sherman). Mack became a vice president of Beatrice and a Beatrice board member. John Sexton & Co. put Beatrice Foods into the wholesale grocery business and Beatrice put John Sexton & Co. into the frozen foods business. Beatrice's and the Sexton's leadership were interested in maximizing the investment in John Sexton & Co. by growing the company.

==== 1976-1980 ====
Wallace Rasmussen was the chairman and CEO of Beatrice Foods from 1976 until 1980, retiring after 47 years with the company. During his tenure, Beatrice added several high-value acquisitions to its portfolio, most notably Tropicana Products, Inc.

=== Final decade ===
==== 1981-1984 ====
During both the 1984 Winter and Summer Olympics, the corporation flooded the TV airwaves with advertisements advising the public that many familiar brands were part of Beatrice Foods. These ads used the tagline (with a jingle) "We're Beatrice. You've known us all along." After the Olympics, advertisements for its products continued to end with the catchphrase "We're Beatrice" and an instrumental version of the "You've known us all along" portion of the jingle, as the red and white "Beatrice" logo would simultaneously appear in the bottom right hand corner. The campaign was found to alienate consumers, as it called attention to the fact that many of their favorite brands were part of a far-reaching multinational corporation. One commercial also mispronounced the name of the founding city. The campaign was pulled off the air by autumn.

At the 87th annual Beatrice shareholders’ meeting on June 5, 1984, stockholders of record were asked to change the name of the company. "Recognizing this clear departure from the past, we are proposing a new name for the company. At our annual meeting in June, stockholders will be asked to change the name to Beatrice Companies, Inc. from Beatrice Foods Co. This change is appropriate given the company's evolution and present composition. It reflects Beatrice's wide range of separate and distinct businesses, many with operations totally unrelated to food processing, yet retains the company's goodwill and reputation for quality products and services." Annual Report, February 29, 1984.

In June 1984, Beatrice acquired Esmark. The Esmark acquisition was part of the company's strategy to focus Beatrice's assets in food and consumer products businesses. In addition to the Swift & Co. and Hunt-Wesson food brands, companies owned by Esmark included Avis Rent a Car, Playtex, Jensen Electronics, and STP. Because of Esmark's national brands, direct sales force, distribution network and research and development capabilities, its acquisition was expected to accelerate the attainment of Beatrice's marketing goals. The company also sought a higher public profile, adding their name to the end of their brands' television commercials, and sponsoring the Newman-Haas IndyCar and Haas Lola Formula One racing teams. Many analysts believe the Esmark acquisition, which was pushed by then Chairman, Chief Executive Officer and President James L. Dutt, put too much of a debt load on Beatrice, which hurt Beatrice's credit rating and therefore deflated the value of Beatrice stock.

==== 1985-1986 ====
1985, Beatrice sold their Beatrice Chemical division to Imperial Chemical Industries. Stahl Finish, Paule Chemical, Polyvinyl Chemical Industries, Converters Ink Company, and Thoro System Products were the business units that formed Beatrice Chemical. Other divisions sold to pay off the debt from the Esmark purchase included Brillion Iron Works, World Dryer, STP, and Buckingham Wine (distributors of Cutty Sark whisky).

In 1986, Beatrice became the target of leveraged buyout specialists Kohlberg Kravis Roberts (KKR) and they ultimately purchased the firm for $8.7 billion. At the time this was the largest leveraged buyout in history — and over the next four years it was sold off, division by division.

Beatrice's Coca-Cola bottling operations (acquired by Beatrice in 1981) were acquired by The Coca-Cola Company for $1 billion in 1986. They were shortly spun off as Coca-Cola Enterprises Beatrice Bottled Water Division (acquired with the Coca-Cola operations) with brands such as Arrowhead Drinking Water, Ozarka Drinking Water, and Great Bear Drinking Water were also sold to Perrier in 1987.

In 1985, Beatrice became involved in motor racing when they became the title sponsors of the Newman/Haas Racing team (owned by Carl Haas and actor Paul Newman) that ran in America's top open wheel racing series CART, as well as the Haas owned Haas Lola team in the Formula One World Championship. This sponsorship only lasted through to mid-1986 due to a change in management at Beatrice.

In December 1986, a group of Company executives, together with Drexel Burnham Lambert bought International Playtex, Inc. in a leveraged buyout and named the newly private organization Playtex Holdings. Playtex included such former Esmark brands as Max Factor, Playtex Living Gloves, Playtex Products, Almay, Jhirmack, and Halston/Orlane.

The Beatrice Dairy Products subsidiary, which included the brands of Meadow Gold, Hotel Bar Butter, Keller's Butter, Mountain High Yogurt, and Viva Milk Products, to Borden, Inc. in December 1986 for $315,000,000.

Other divisions sold in 1986 included Americold and Danskin.

==== 1987-1990 ====
Brands like Samsonite, Culligan, Stiffel Lamps, del mar window coverings, Louver Drape window coverings, Aristokraft kitchen cabinets, Day-Timer planner, Waterloo Industries tool boxes, Aunt Nellies and Martha White were merged into a new entity called E-II Holdings, which was later purchased by American Brands for 1.14 billion. E-II was created in June, 1987, as an umbrella company for several non-food and specialty food businesses of Beatrice. Meshulam Riklis bought E-II from American Brands in 1988; American Brands bought back Aristokraft, Day-Timer, Waterloo, Twentieth Century and Vogel Peterson.

Tropicana Products was sold to Seagram for $1.2 billion in 1988.

All of the international operations were folded into a new entity called Beatrice International Holdings in 1987, which was later purchased that year through junk bond financing for $985 million by Reginald Lewis, a corporate attorney, creating TLC Beatrice International. TLC Beatrice International became the largest business in America owned by an African American and the first company to reach a billion dollars in sales, with a black man at its head. TLC Beatrice sold the Canadian operations; Beatrice Foods Canada, Ltd., in 1990 to Onyx, which later sold it to Parmalat in 1997.

In 1987, KKR had formed a new entity, with similar intent as E-II Holdings, called Beatrice Company, which was specifically created to include Beatrice Cheese, Beatrice-Hunt/Wesson, and Swift-Eckrich. In 1990, KKR sold Beatrice Company to Conagra Brands. Most of Beatrice's brand names still exist, but under various other owners, as trademarks and product lines were sold separately to the highest bidder.

== Controversies ==
Through the 1980s, Beatrice was a co-defendant alongside W.R. Grace and Company in a lawsuit alleging that the Riley Tannery, a division of Beatrice Foods, had dumped toxic waste which contaminated an underground aquifer that supplied drinking water to East Woburn, Massachusetts. The case became the subject of the popular book and film A Civil Action. Federal judge Walter Jay Skinner ruled that Beatrice was not responsible for the contamination, although according to the book and film, based on new evidence brought forward by the EPA later found, Judge Skinner reversed his verdict and found both companies responsible.

In the 1980s, the firm operated in South Africa during apartheid. As it was a private company, the campaign of divestment could not lower its stock price and thus had no impact on its business activities.

== Current era ==
The original Beatrice Companies (Beatrice Foods Co. before 1984, and Beatrice Creamery Company before 1946) dissolved in 1987 by KKR, and continued to do business under Beatrice Company, a totally new business entity, which was then merged with CAGSUB, Inc., a wholly-owned subsidiary of Conagra Brands. Beatrice of today still exists as a brand in Canada, owned by French conglomerate Lactalis. Beatrice in USA, formed in 2007, conducts business primarily in media broadcasting, and epicurean food products.

== Former brands ==
- Absopure distilled and spring water
- Accurate Threaded Fasteners
- Acryon leisure and household products
- Advanced Nutrition Formula|Agri-Products
- A.H.Schwab children's play products
- A.J. ten|Doesschate, Holland
- Airstream
- Allison leisure apparel
- All-Pro leisure apparel
- Altoids
- American Hostess ice cream
- American Pickles
- Antoine's food products
- Aqua Queen garden equipment
- Argosy recreational vehicles
- Arist O' Kraft cabinets
- Armitage Realty Co.
- Arrowhead Water
- Assumption Abbey wine products
- Aunt Nellie's food products
- Avan recreational vehicles
- Avis
- Banner painting equipment
- Barbara Dee cookies
- Barcrest beverage mixes
- Beatreme dairy products and flavorings
- Beatrice dairy products
- Becky Kay's cookies
- Beefbreak meat specialties
- Beeforcan meat specialties
- Beneke bathroom accessories
- Best Jet painting equipment
- Bickford food products
- Bighorn specialty meats
- Big Pete specialty meats
- Bireley's orange drink (Asahi Soft Drinks)
- Bloomfield Industries
- Blue Ribbon condiments
- Blue Valley Creamery Company
- Body Shaper plumbing supplies
- Bogene closet accessories
- Boizet specialty food products
- Bonanza mini-motorhomes
- Binkers cat treats
- Bosman barbecue equipment
- Bowers candies
- Bredan butter
- Brenner candy
- Brillion Iron Works
- Brookside wine products
- Brown Miller condiments
- Brown 'N Serve
- Bubble Stream plumbing equipment
- Burny Bros. Bakery
- Butterball
- Butterchef Bakery
- Buttercrust baked goods
- Buxton leather accessories
- Byrons barbecue
- California Products beverage mixes
- Campus Casuals sport clothing
- Captain Kids food products
- Cartwheels travel bags
- CCA Furniture accessories
- Chapelcord school and religious apparel
- Charmglow barbecue grills and outdoor products
- Checkers beverages
- Chicago red wine products
- Chicago specialty plumbing tools and supplies
- Churngold condiments
- Cincinnati Fruit condiments and fountain syrups
- Citro Crest beverage mixes
- Clark candy
- Classic travel bags
- Classy Crisps
- Colonial Cookies|Canada
- Colorado By-Products|Agri-Products
- Converts Ink CONCO
- Cremo Limited|Jamaica
- Cook n' Cajun barbecue equipment
- Costello's food products
- Country Hearth baked goods
- County Line cheeses
- Cow Boy Jo's meat specialities
- Culligan
- C.W. pickles
- Dannon yogurt
- Day-Timers
- Eckrich
- E.R. Moore Co.
- Etablissements Baud|Paris, France
- Farboil Paint Co.
- Fibreite Composites
- Franprix
- Gebhardt Mexican foods
- Geerpres
- Good & Plenty
- Harman Kardon
- Hart Skis
- Helados Calatayud|Spain
- Henry Berry & Co|Australia
- Hunt's
- Imperial Oil & Grease
- JH Rhodes
- Jolly Rancher
- Kalise Menorquina
- Kobey's
- Krispy Kreme
- La Choy
- Lakeview Pure Milk, Ltd.
- Little Brownie cookies
- LouverDrape
- Ma Brown jams, jellies, pickles
- Mario olives
- Market Forge Industries Inc.
- Martha White
- Mantecados Payco, Inc.|Puerto Rico
- Melnor
- Meadow Gold
- Mid-America Container
- Milk Duds
- Monson Printing & Monroe Paper Company
- Morgan Yacht Company
- Mrs. Leland's Candy
- Now and Later
- Orville Redenbacher's
- The Ozarka Spring Water Company
- Patra Holdings Pty., Ltd.|Australia
- Pauly of Wisconsin
- Peter Pan
- Pfister & Vogel
- Pik-Nik
- Playtex
- Polyvinyl Chemical Group
- Premier Ice Cream Co.|Denmark
- Red Tulip|Australia
- Reddi-Wip
- Regal Packer By-Products|Agri-Products
- Rosarita
- Rudolph Foods
- Rusty Jones
- Samsonite
- Sanson Gelati, S.p.A.|Verona, Italy
- Sap's Donuts
- Sexton Foods
- Shedd's
- Snowco
- Soup Starter
- Stahl Finish
- Stiffel Lamps
- Swift Ice Cream
- Swift's Premium
- Swiss Miss
- Switzer licorice
- Taylor Freezer Corporation
- Termicold
- THORO|Weatherproofing products
- Treasure Cave
- Tropicana
- Utah By-Products|Agri-Products
- V-H Quality Foods|Canada
- Vigortone|Agri-Products
- Vogel-Peterson
- Wells Manufacturing
- Western By-Products|Agri-Products
- Waterloo Industries, Inc.
- Wesson
- World Dryer hand dryers

== Beatrice Foods Canada ==
Beatrice Foods Canada is a Toronto, Ontario-based dairy unit of Parmalat Canada. The Canadian unit of Beatrice Foods was founded in 1969, and was separated from Beatrice Foods in 1978, since then being relatively shielded by the American Beatrice's corporate buyouts and eventual dissolution and remaining one of Canada's largest food processing concerns.

In 1997, Italy's Parmalat acquired Beatrice Foods Canada. At first, Parmalat dropped the Beatrice name from the company's products, but reinstated it in late 2005 as that conglomerate was under its own bankruptcy and accounting scandal. French conglomerate Lactalis acquired Parmalat in whole in 2011, retaining its Canadian assets as-is while adding its own brands over time.

== See also ==
- Lee Archer, head of North Street Capital Corporation and Archer Asset Management
- A Civil Action
- List of defunct consumer brands
