= Rusty Jones =

Rusty Jones may refer to:

- Rusty Jones (American football), Chicago Bears strength and conditioning coordinator
- Rusty Jones (guitarist), guitarist for The Monroes band
- Rusty Jones (musician) (1942–2015), American jazz drummer
- Rusty Jones (company), American rustproofing solution provider
