= Culligan =

Water treatment company

Culligan International
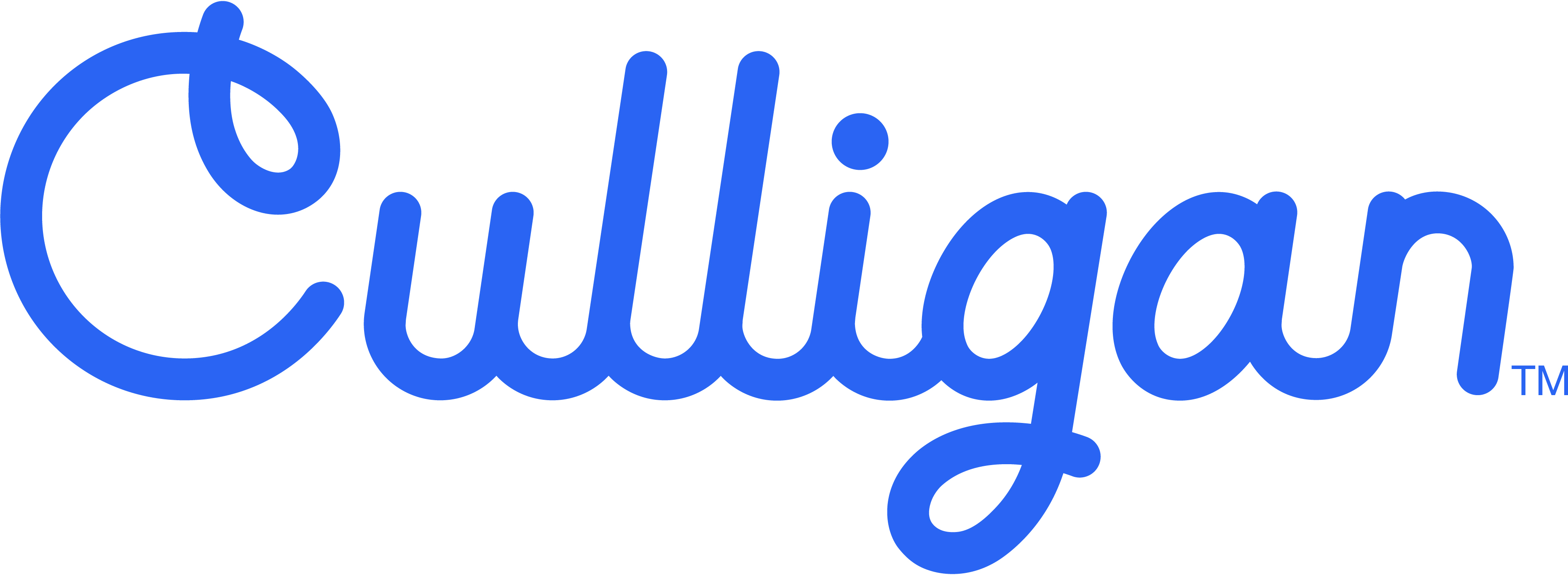

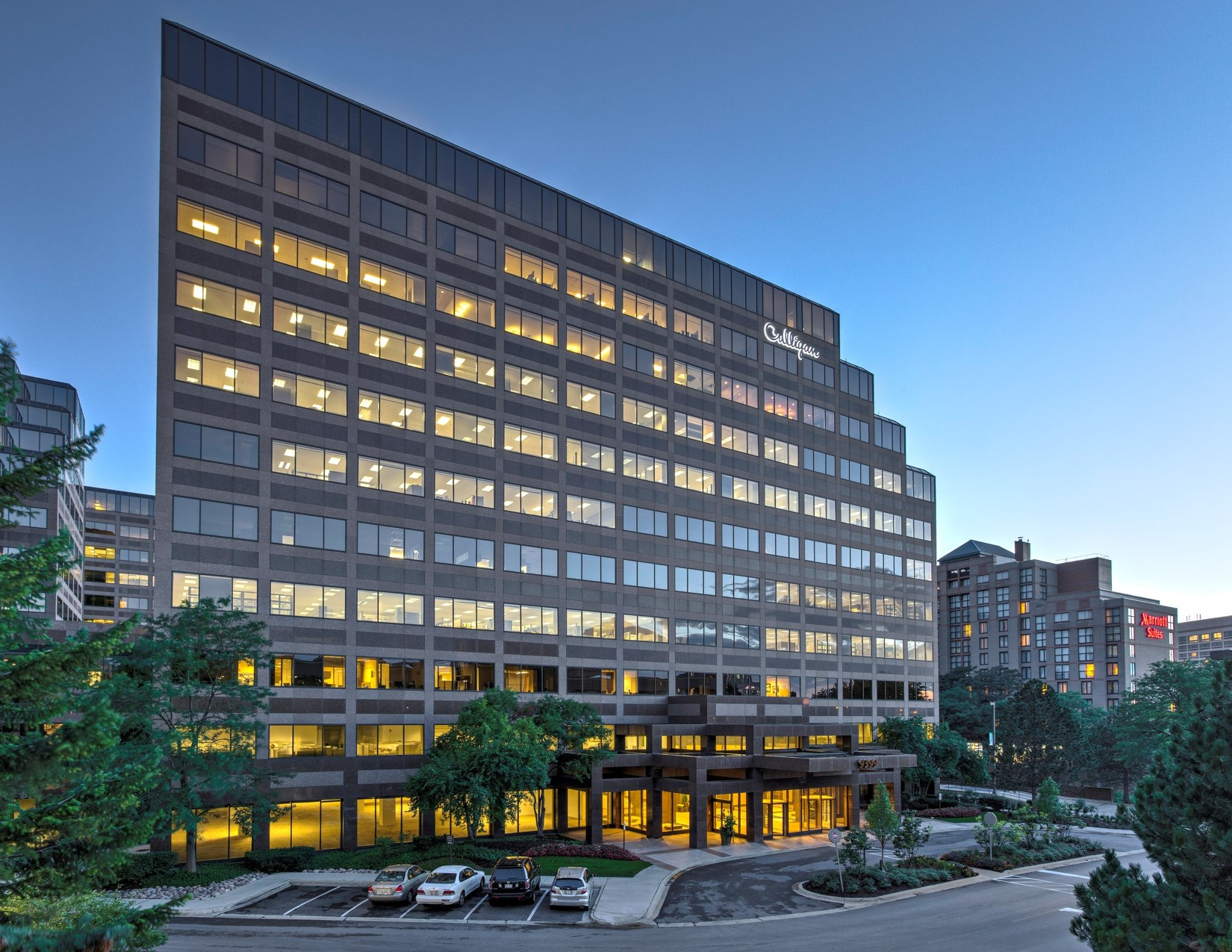
- Type: Private
- Industry: Water Treatment Products & Service
- Founded: 1936; 90 years ago
- Founder: Emmett J. Culligan
- Headquarters: Rosemont, Illinois
- Key people: Scott Clawson (President & CEO)
- Products: Water and water treatment products
- Owner: BDT Capital Partners And 40% stake with Thomas Culligan Jr of Akron, Ohio
- Number of employees: 14,000

Culligan International is a United States based global water treatment company with a network of dealers and direct operations in 90 countries with 1,000 dealers; over 600 in North America alone, and more than 14,000 employees.

== History ==
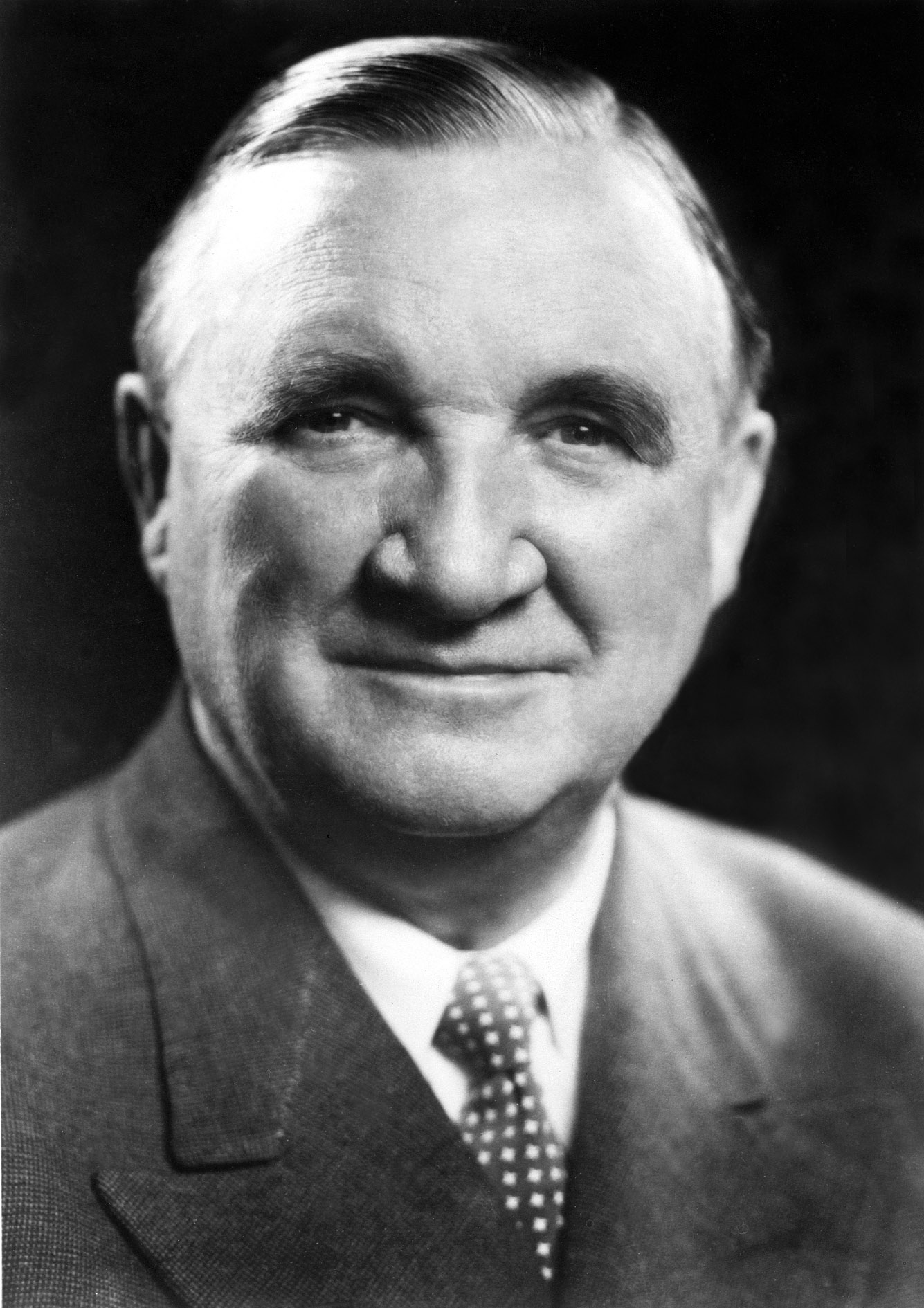
Emmett J. Culligan

The Culligan-Zeolite Company was founded in 1936 by Emmett Joseph Culligan in Northbrook, Illinois. With $50 and with additional financing by his brother Dr. John M. Culligan, and his sister, Anna V. Culligan, Emmett established the Culligan Zeolite Company with his brothers Drs. John and Leo Culligan as partners. They started the business in John "Jock" McLachlan's Blacksmith Shop in Northbrook, Illinois. Emmett perforated the bottom of a coffee can and used greensand to make a water filter. Upon running water through his device, he discovered that the filter acted as a water softener. By 1938, the first Culligan franchised dealership opened in Wheaton, Illinois, followed by another in Hagerstown, Maryland. In 1945, Emmett dissolved the partnership with his brothers and a new company was incorporated. Emmett was president until 1950 when he became chairman of the board and Harold Werhane was made president. In 1962, the name was changed to Culligan, Incorporated. The company now has its international headquarters in Rosemont, Illinois. To date, there are more than 1,000 dealerships and business offices in over 90 countries. For information refer to the company magazine Topics of July 1970. Later, Beatrice Foods acquired the company.

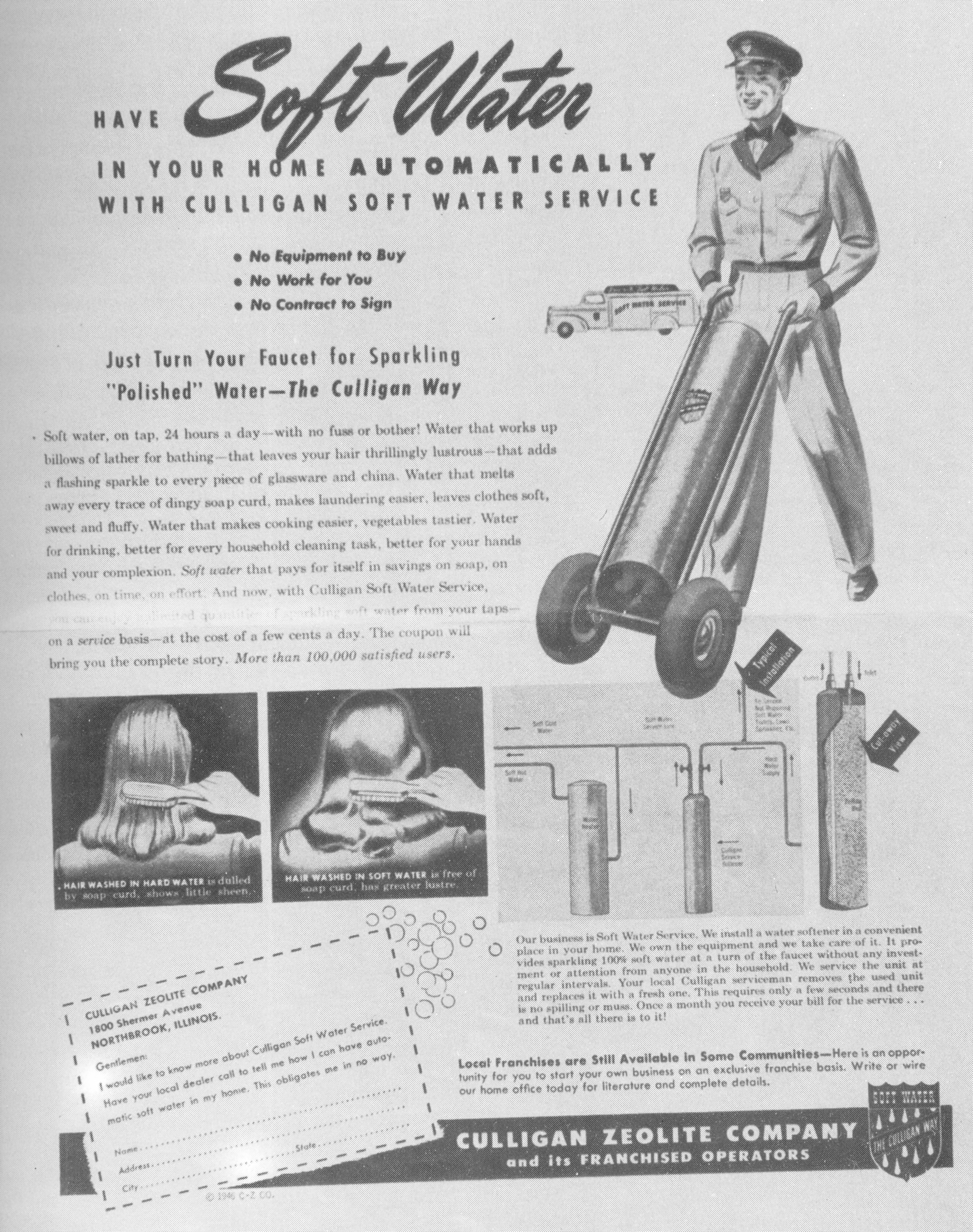

In 1986, Beatrice Foods, newly acquired by Kohlberg Kravis Roberts, spun off its specialty foods and non-food brands as E-II Holdings. E-II attempted to take over American Brands in 1988. Instead, American Brands purchased E-II. American Brands later sold the majority of the E-II brands to Meshulam Riklis. Riklis soon left the company, and E-II filed for bankruptcy in 1992. After a takeover battle from Carl Icahn, E-II emerged from bankruptcy in 1993 under the name Astrum International. Culligan was spun off in 1995, and Astrum was renamed Samsonite.

Culligan was acquired by United States Filter in 1998. US Filter was acquired by Vivendi in 1999. Vivendi spun off its water business in 2000, and the resulting company, Veolia Environnement, sold Culligan to Clayton, Dubilier & Rice in 2003. In 2004, Entrepreneur Magazine named Culligan the number one franchise in its industry. In 2007, Culligan's headquarters moved from Northbrook, Illinois to in Rosemont, Illinois with the only state-of-the-art analytical laboratory certified by the State of Illinois Environmental Protection Agency to be compliant with National Environmental Laboratory Accreditation Conference standards. Centerbridge Partners acquired Culligan in 2012.

In 2021, during a bid to buy out the UK supermarket chain Morrisons, Culligans accused Clayton, Dubilier & Rice of Asset Stripping, leaving the firm 'saddled with over $850 million of debt', CD&R denied the accusations. In 2021, Culligan was acquired by BDT Capital Partners, LLC.

== Company slogan ==
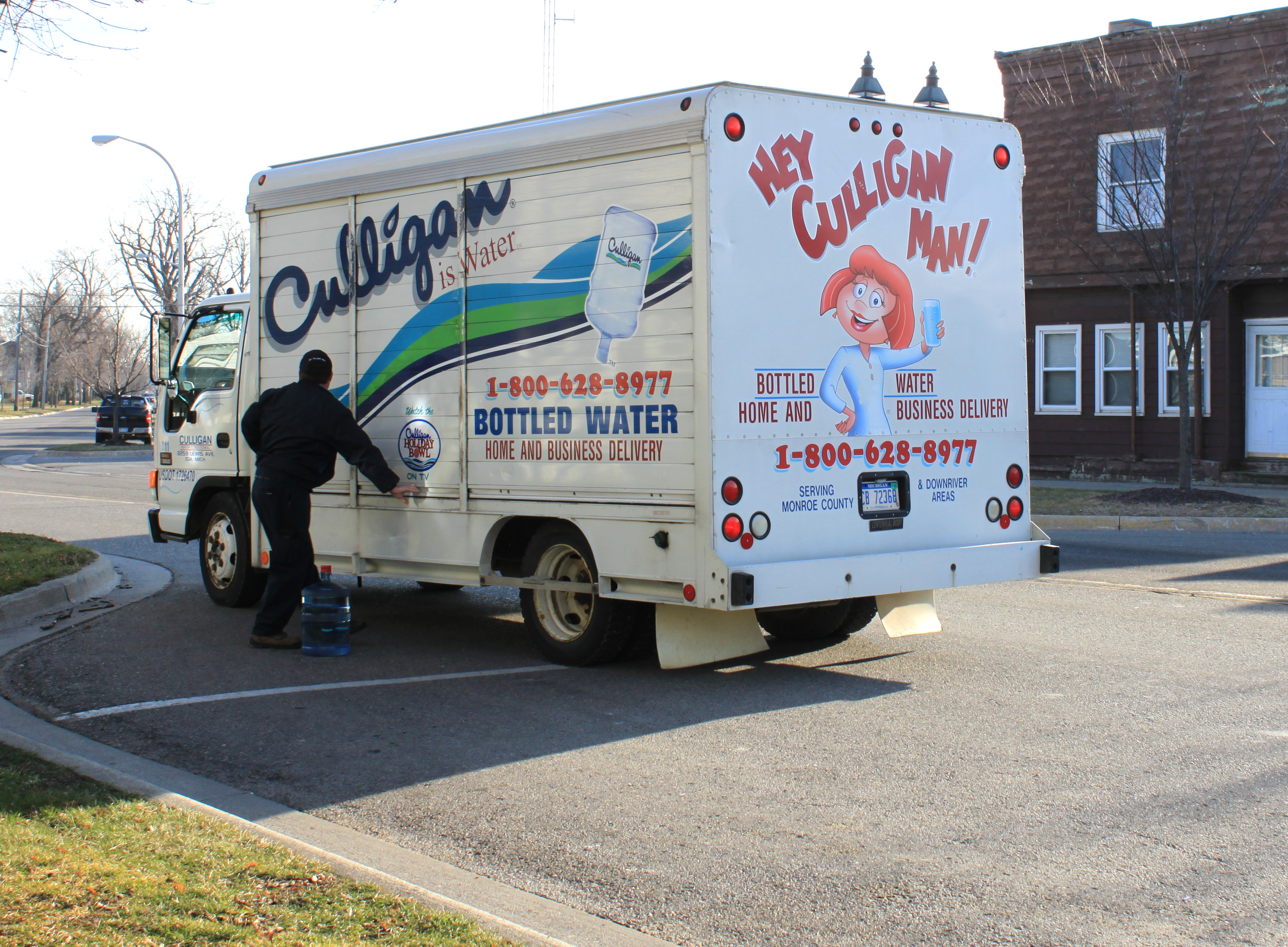
Culligan delivery truck in Dundee, Michigan with the old advertising slogan

Culligan's first known advertisement was in Life in 1947. From there, they are best known for a television and radio advertisement featuring a housewife yelling out the slogan "Hey, Culligan Man!" in a raucous tone in response to the announcer advising her to "Call your Culligan Man." The campaign was created in 1959 for radio by Dallas Williams Productions of Los Angeles. He played the straight man in these advertisements, and his wife Jean Hughes Williams provided the shouting voice. Filmmaker Dan Bessie directed and animated the award-winning "Hey, Culligan Man!" soft water commercials for 15 years. Variations of "Hey, Culligan Man!" ads would continue to air for over three decades.

In 2018, Culligan launched a North American re-branding campaign, as Culligan Water, during the Golden Globes with a television advertisement featuring Cary Elwes. As of January 7, 2018, the slogan "Hey, Culligan Man!" is now "Hey, Culligan!" in an effort to build "contemporary branding".
