= Rusty Edwards =

American hymnwriter

Rusty Edwards is a hymnwriter who was born in Dixon, Illinois, on January 22, 1955. Dozens of his hymns have been published in 100 books in Australia, Brazil, Canada, China, Czech Republic, England, Ireland, Japan, New Zealand, Scotland, and USA. He has published six collections of hymns, including The Yes of the Heart (with a Foreword by Chick Corea), Grateful Praise, As Sunshine to a Garden, Each Breath Every Heartbeat'and Bidden, Unbidden. His sixth book is Uncommon Mercy was written with co-writers from fifteen countries. Dave Brubeck wrote a tune for Rusty’s lyric "As the Moon is to the Sun", included in Dave Brubeck at the Piano'. Rusty is Executive Producer of GRAMMY winning “How Love Begins” by Nicole Zuraitis. He was a Visiting Fellow at Africa University in Zimbabwe. In 2015, he received an honorary Doctor of Divinity degree from Lutheran Theological Southern Seminary at Lenoir-Rhyne University. He has also led workshops in Brazil, Russia, England, and Sweden. He is a Georgia Master Naturalist participant.
