= Reliant Bancorp =

US financial corporation

- Company type: Public
- Traded as: Nasdaq: RBNC; Russell 2000 Component
- Founded: 2006
- Fate: Merged with United Community Bank
- Headquarters: 1736 Carothers Parkway, Brentwood, Tennessee, United States
- Key people: DeVan Ard, Jr.(Chairman); Sharon H. Edwards (Lead Independent Director)
- Services: Financial services
- Revenue: ▲US$ 78.9 million (2018)
- Net income: ▲US$ 14.1 million (2018)
- Total assets: ▲US$ 1.7 billion (2018)
- Total equity: ▲US$ 208.4 million (2018)
- Website: reliantbank.com commerceunionbank.com

Reliant Bancorp, Inc, formerly Commerce Union Bancshares, is an American financial corporation based in Brentwood, Tennessee, USA. It was listed on the NASDAQ until its merger with United Community Bank in January 2022. It controls a subsidiary, Reliant Bank, a commercial bank.

== History ==
Commerce Union Bancshares was founded in 2006, operating as Commerce Union Bank. Its chairman was Charles T. Beasley and its chief executive officer and president was Ron DeBerry.

The corporation acquired Reliant Bank through a merger in 2014. By September 2015, it announced it would use the brandname of Reliant Bank to avoid confusion with a defunct Nashville-based bank named Commerce Union Bank which later merged with Bank of America. Additionally, it announced its headquarters would move from Springfield, Tennessee to Brentwood, a suburb of Nashville, Tennessee.

Reliant Bancorp has been a public corporation listed on the NASDAQ on July 7, 2015.

In January 2017, the corporation announced the retirement of Ron DeBerry as chairman and CEO and appointed DeVan D. Ard, Jr., president of Commerce Union Bancshares, Inc. and president and chief executive officer of Reliant Bank.

The corporation changed its name to Reliant Bancorp, Inc. on December 31, 2017.

The corporation acquired Community First, Inc. (“Community First”) and Community First Bank & Trust, Community First's wholly owned bank subsidiary, located in Columbia, Tennessee, through a merger on January 1, 2018.

On January 2, 2020, Reliant Bancorp acquired Tennessee Community Bank Holdings, Inc. (“TCB Holdings”), the parent company for Community Bank & Trust (“Community Bank”), located in Ashland City, Tennessee.

At the time of its merger with United Community Bank in January 2022, Reliant Bancorp operated 24-branches, primarily in the Nashville area.
