= Accuride Corporation =

American vehicle component manufacturer

- Company type: Private
- Founded: 1986
- Headquarters: Livonia, Michigan, United States
- Key people: Robin Kendrick, President & CEO
- Website: www.accuridecorp.com

Accuride International (California), an unrelated company, is a manufacturer of drawer slides.

Accuride Corporation is a diversified manufacturer and supplier of commercial vehicle components in North America. Based in Livonia, Michigan, the company designs, manufactures and markets commercial vehicle components.

Accuride's brands are Accuride Wheels, Gunite Wheel End Components, and KIC Wheel End Components. Its products include commercial vehicle wheels, wheel-end components and assemblies.

== History ==
=== Bain Capital founding ===
Accuride was founded in 1986 in order to acquire the wheel-making division of Firestone Tire & Rubber Company. The purchase was orchestrated by Bain Capital under the direction of Mitt Romney. Accuride's earnings rose 20 percent in the first year under Bain's watch, and the number of plants increased by 16 percent to 1,785. The success of the takeover and turnaround quickly put Romney and Bain on the map.

=== Recession and bankruptcy ===
In October 2009, the company sought legal protection from its creditors under Chapter 11 bankruptcy rules, and in November 2009 sought court approval to reorganize itself. On 26 February 2010, Accuride emerged from Chapter 11 bankruptcy with a new capital structure.

=== Acquisition by Crestview Partners ===
In 2016 Accuride was acquired by Crestview Partners, a New York–based private equity firm for $2.58 per share in cash. As part of the transaction, Accuride announced it sold its Brillion Iron Works subsidiary to Metaldyne Performance Group (MPG) for a total of $14 million.

In October 2024, Accuride again filed for Chapter 11 bankruptcy after it fell victim to a freight industry recession. The company listed liabilities between $500 million to $1 billion.

== Business ==
The company produces commercial vehicle wheels, wheel-end components and assemblies, and other commercial vehicle components. Accuride markets its products using three brand names: Accuride, Gunite, and KIC.
