= Rusty Young =

Rusty Young may refer to:

- Rusty Young (musician) (1946–2021), pedal steel guitarist with the band Poco
- Rusty Young (writer) (born 1975), Australian novelist
