= Brillion Iron Works =

Defunct agricultural machinery manufacturers of the United States

- Founded: 1890
- Defunct: 2016
- Headquarters: 200 Park Ave. Brillion, Wisconsin
- Key people: Randy Brull; General Manager
- Products: Metal castings; farm implements
- Revenue: $100-$250 million
- Number of employees: 1,000

Brillion Iron Works, or BIW, was a foundry and a manufacturer of farm implements located in Brillion, Wisconsin. BIW produced approximately 145,000 net tons of gray and ductile iron castings annually, ranking it among the top ten independent foundries in the United States.

Brillion Iron Works originated in 1890 as a manufacturer of hand and farm tools. The foundry was added in 1900 when the plant was relocated and new buildings were added.

In 1969, the company became a division of Beatrice Foods; in 1985, they became part of The Robins Group; in 1988, the company became a subsidiary of Truck Components; and, in 2005, they became an Accuride company. The company was sold to Metaldyne Performance Group in September 2016 and was closed shortly thereafter in November 2016.

As of December 2019 demolition of the Brillion Iron Works site had begun. The Brillion Iron Works site has been rebranded as BrillionWorks and is planned to be a mixed use space consisting of office, retail, and dining.
