= Rusty Jones (company) =

American rustproofing company

Rusty Jones, Inc.
- Industry: Automotive aftermarket
- Founded: Approx 1970
- Defunct: 1988
- Fate: Bankrupt
- Headquarters: Chicago, Illinois
- Products: Rustproofing

Rusty Jones Inc. was an American chemicals company which produced aftermarket rustproofing for vehicles under their "Rusty Jones" trademark. Cars treated with the rustproofing displayed a sticker in the window with the name "Rusty Jones" and a picture of the cartoon character (also named Rusty Jones) from the company's TV commercials. The company was based in Chicago, Illinois.

== Formation and history ==
The company, founded by Michael Mater around 1970 as "Matex Corporation", became successful on a local scale by offering aftermarket rustproofing services to automobile owners under the brand "Body by Thixo-Tex". The name Thixo-Tex was derived from the thixotropic properties (a viscous fluid that flows to fill small abrasions} of the rustproofing chemical applied to the cars. Mater hired an advertising agency, Dawson, Johns & Black, to promote the brand, resulting in a rebrand to "Rusty Jones" and creation of the cartoon character spokesman. Company revenue increased and Rusty Jones became a nationally known competitor to Ziebart.

Mater sold Rusty Jones to Beatrice Foods in 1984 and was hired by Beatrice as president of Rusty Jones with a five-year contract. Beatrice mismanaged the company and steeply cut advertising budgets, discontinuing an agreement with NASCAR and allowing the company to lose market share; between 1985 and 1988, the company's distribution network declined from 3,000 new car dealerships to 1,800. In November 1988, the company was purchased from Beatrice by Rustco Inc., a new company formed by Renaissance Holdings, with plans to restructure, continue operations and avoid bankruptcy. However the new owners ultimately filed Chapter 11 bankruptcy protection in December 1988 with the official explanation that automakers' extension of factory warranties against rust had caused business to deteriorate. The company's former director of marketing Bruce Freud also said in 2003 that the company had been "unbelievably profitable", but that its insurance carrier (who serviced the rust warranties on Rusty Jones treated vehicles) filed for bankruptcy, creating problems for the company.
