= BiRite Foodservice Distributors =

American food service distributor

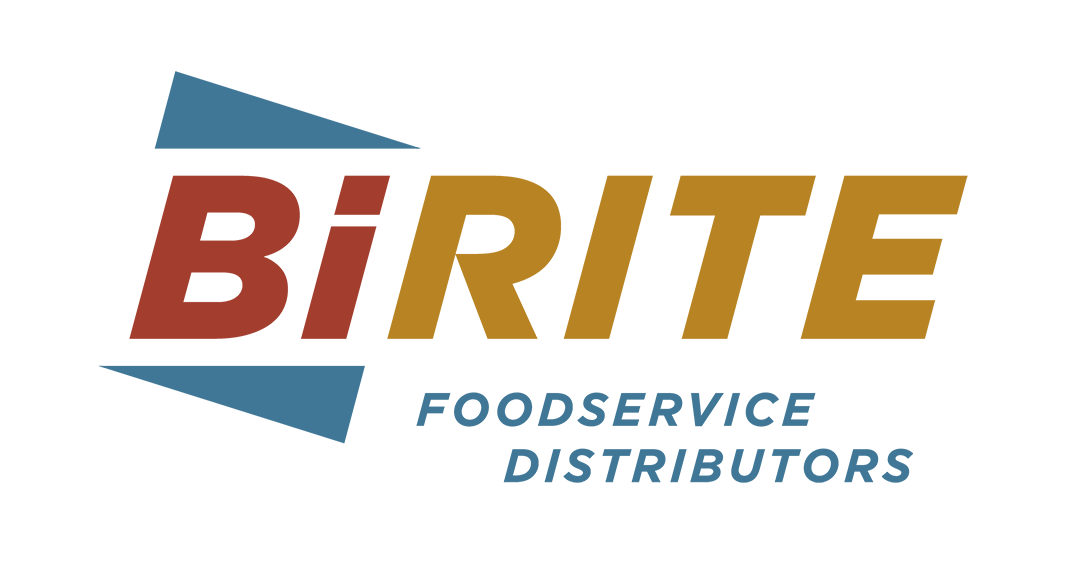
- Industry: Food industry
- Founded: 1966
- Founder: Victor Barulich
- Headquarters: Brisbane, CA
- Number of locations: 1
- Area served: San Francisco Bay Area
- Key people: Bill Barulich (CEO & President)
- Services: Foodservice distribution
- Number of employees: 300+
- Website: www.birite.com

BiRite Foodservice Distributors is one of northern California's leading foodservice distributors. With more than $285 million in annual sales, BiRite is the 24th largest foodservice distributor in the nation.

On December 12, 2012, BiRite announced the acquisition of local produce company, A&B Produce.

== History ==
The company was founded in 1966 by cousins John Barulich and Victor Barulich in San Francisco, California. At the time, it was a small warehouse of five employees who supplied canned goods to many of San Francisco's coffee shops and restaurants.

In 1981, the company moved to a new 238,000 square foot distribution facility in Brisbane, California. Currently, the company has over 300 employees and is still owned and operated by the Barulich family.

== Awards ==
- Ranked 44th on San Francisco Business Times 100 Largest Bay Area Private Companies in 2014
- Recognized on Silicon Valley Business Journal's Bay Area's Healthiest Employers in 2013
- Ranked 24th in ID Magazine's Top 50 Distributors in 2011
- Winner of the International Foodservice Manufacturers Association Excellence in Distribution Award in 2011

== See also ==
- Bell Brand Snack Foods
- Del Frisco's Restaurant Group
