= Sexton Foods =

Former wholesale grocer

John Sexton & Company
- Type: Public
- Industry: Food distribution
- Founded: 1883
- Fate: Merged with Beatrice Foods in 1968, bought by S.E. Rykoff in 1983, in 1994, Rykoff-Sexton purchased US Foodservice. In 1997, JP Foodservice merged with Rykoff-Sexton-US Foodservice Company in a stock and debt assumption transaction. Operates today as US Foodservice.
- Headquarters: Chicago, Illinois, US
- Products: Food, wholesale groceries, food service, restaurant equipment

John Sexton & Company, also known as Sexton Quality Foods, was a broad line national wholesale grocer that serviced the restaurant, hotel and institutional trade from regional warehouses and truck fleets located in major metropolitan areas of the United States. Sexton Quality Foods eventually became US Foodservice in 1997. The company was established in Chicago in 1883 by John Sexton.

== Beginnings ==
John Peter Sexton was born June 29, 1858, in Dundas, Ontario, Canada to Michael and Ellen (Connors) Sexton. (Michael and Ellen had emigrated from County Clare, Ireland and married in Dundas on May 11, 1854, with Cornelius Sexton and Elizabeth Connors witnesses.)

John Sexton worked in a general store in Niagara Falls, Ontario 1874–1877. He immigrated to Chicago in 1877 at 18 and began working for various wholesale grocers in Chicago as a clerk and city salesman. During this time, he realized that there was an opportunity to specialize in selling quality teas, coffees and spices.

John Sexton married Anna Louise Bartleman (born May 22, 1866, Chicago) on August 11, 1886, in Chicago. (Anna Louise's parents, Christian and Theresa (Albrecht) Bartleman had emigrated from Saxe-Coburg Gotha, Germany in the mid-1850s.) The couple had five children: Thomas George (born February 21, 1889, Chicago), Franklin (born 2/16/1891), Sherman J. (born 9/12/1892), Helen (Egan) (b.?) and Ethel (Marten) (born 1896). The family home was at 2238 North Dayton Street in Chicago. All three sons and both sons-in-law worked for the company in various roles.

== History ==
=== John Sexton & Co. established ===
In 1883, at the age of 25, John Sexton invested his entire life savings of $400 and formed a corporation with George A. Hitchcock, the Hitchcock & Sexton Company, which opened a small office at 5 Wabash in downtown Chicago. Within a year, Hitchcock & Sexton moved to 20 State Street (near State and Lake now 200 N. State Street) which was owned by John DeKoven.

As business increased, Hitchcock & Sexton opened three more retail stores in the Chicago area, including one in Joliet. This made Hitchcock & Sexton one of the first retail coffee and tea chain proprietors in the United States. In 1886, Hitchcock sold Sexton his interest in the business and renamed the company John Sexton & Co. To help run the business, John Sexton recruited his sisters Mary (Barton); Sarah (O'Leary); Brigid "Bea" (Mulligan), who later married widower Francis Upton; and his younger brother James J. Sexton to move to Chicago from Dundas, Ontario. The sisters each ran one of his retail stores and lived above it with their families. In addition to family, John Sexton relied on recruiting high-quality employees by offering attractive wages, sales commissions and fair dealing.

As word spread of Sexton's quality products, fair dealings and unconditional guarantee, restaurant and hotel customers came to the Sexton retail stores to buy spices, tea and coffee. Sexton also added dried and canned goods to his stores. In addition, he began to call on the Chicago restaurants and hotels directly. He hired salesmen and delivery drivers to service on the wholesale accounts, and purchased horses and wagons to make deliveries. By 1888, Sexton decided to close his four retail stores and focus solely on his Chicago wholesale customers. He expanded the State Street store by renting the rest of the building.

John Sexton & Co., 16-22 State Street (200 N. State St), Chicago, April 17, 1897

In 1890, Sexton established an institutional department to call on hospitals, colleges, schools, railroad dining cars and religious organizations around the country. These customers required consistent quality products that were available in sufficient quantity all year long. Sexton developed an extensive product line as well as a distribution network based in Chicago. To call on the institutional market throughout the country, he recruited commission-based salesmen in the major urban markets of Atlanta, Boston, Cleveland, Dallas, Detroit, Houston, Indianapolis, Kansas City, Los Angeles, Milwaukee, Minneapolis, New York, Salt Lake City, San Francisco and Washington, D.C..

In addition to the major urban markets, Sexton recruited regional commission-based salesmen to call on customers who required quality groceries in large quantity to feed their clients or work force, but were far from major metropolitan areas. Regional salesmen called on lumbermen, ranchers, miners and grain farmers who had large work forces to feed. These salesmen would also call on hotels, restaurants, hotels, hospitals, schools and orphanages. To further establish the Sexton brand, he advertised in specific hospital and institutional dietician publications. The most effective marketing was at professional trade conventions where Sexton Quality Foods would sponsor a tasting booth featuring its products. Institutional customers could sample products and Sexton salesmen could develop contacts and sales leads. This proved enormously successful since no other grocery company at the time was effectively servicing this huge market. The 1893 Chicago's World Fair provided a chance to showcase Sexton's ability to deliver quality food in large quantity to meet the demand of the huge influx of tourist into Chicago.

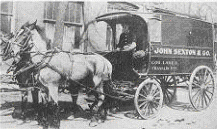
John Sexton & Co. team, wagon and driver making grocery deliveries from the Franklin and Lake Street building in the Chicago Loop, spring of 1910

In 1898, John Sexton & Co. was incorporated. The company directors were John Sexton, president; Dan E. Upton (cousin), vice president, Harold R. White, secretary; and William M. O'Leary (nephew), treasurer.

John Sexton & Co. letterhead depicting Lake and Franklin building, 1910

As John Sexton & Co. grew, the Sexton name became synonymous with quality products, fair dealings, uniform consistent food quality and unconditional guarantee. A bronze plaque hung in the building lobby read "All who come here to buy or sell fairly are always welcome."

Some of the original brand names used by Sexton included Calumet, LaSalle, Pride of the West, Pyramid and Edelweiss. An innovation pioneered by John Sexton & Co. was the 1 gallon #10 can. The #10 can was sanitary, economical and revolutionized restaurant kitchen storage since it was easy to lift, easy to open, stacked well and did not require refrigeration. The #10 can is still the industry standard.

John Sexton & Co. fair dealings 1906

At the end of 1907, John Sexton & Co. had 125 employees in Chicago, a large Chicago customer base serviced by a city sales force, a national customer base serviced by a regional sales force, and a strong rural mail order trade. Sexton had outgrown the State Street location, so moved the company four blocks west to the corner of Lake and Franklin Streets (236 W. Lake Street). In 1908, Sexton Quality Foods leased the entire six-story building for a term of 10 years that expired April 1918. Prior to moving in, electric service and elevators were installed. A side note in Chicago real estate history, in 1885, J.B. Clow & Sons, a cast-iron pipe manufacturer entered into a 99-year ground lease with landowner John Peacock at a rate of $3,000 per year with 4% annual increases. That same year, J.B. Clow & Sons constructed a six-story office building. In 1908, J.B. Clow & Sons relocated to a larger building at Harrison and the River and leased the building to John Sexton & Co. By 1909, John Peacock's widow sold the ground to George L. Thatcher for $173,000. John Sexton & Co. organized the building into sales, warehouse, manufacturing and laboratory. At the new location, Sexton expanded into the manufacture of pickles, relishes, spices and preserves. Company horses were stabled at a livery one mile west of the building.

=== Modernization ===
John Sexton & Co. building on the corner of Illinois and Orleans, 300,000 square feet (28,000 m^{2}) Chicago, 1915

Sexton drivers pose with new city delivery fleet made up of all electric trucks on the west side of the Sexton Building on the corner of Illinois and Orleans Streets in the River North area of Chicago, 1924.

By 1912, Sexton had outgrown the Lake and Franklin location. In 1913, Sexton purchased a 1-acre (4,000 m^{2}) parcel of land on the north side of the Chicago River on the corner of Illinois and Orleans Streets. The majority of Sexton's customers at that time were not in Chicago. Access to the railroads was critical to growing the business. Institutional customers throughout the country would order groceries by the railcar from Sexton Quality Foods, and Sexton wanted his new building to be able to receive and dispatch rail shipments directly. In 1913, construction of a 300,000-square-foot (28,000 m^{2}), six-story, fire sprinkler-protected, multi-use building designed by architect Alfred S. Alschuler was started.

John Sexton & Co. leadership in 1914. Front row, left to right: Franklin Sexton, Dan Upton, John Sexton, Sherman Sexton, Harold R. White. Second row, left to right: Edmund Egan, William O'Leary, Thomas G. Sexton.

In 1915, Sexton moved into the new building that housed the corporate offices, sales offices, country division, dry goods warehouse, food laboratory, refrigeration plant, and the Sexton Quality Foods manufacturing division, the Sunshine Kitchens, which produced private label sauces, soups and specialty products exclusively sold under the John Sexton & Co. banner. The first floor was divided into railcar receiving, railcar shipping, country parcel shipping, city delivery and city receiving. The building was large enough to unload three railcars simultaneously.

By 1921, Sexton had established distribution warehouses in San Francisco, Dallas and Omaha. This was done partly to improve customer service by reducing the time between order and delivery. In addition, a majority of canned fruits, jellies and preserves were grown and packed on the west coast. Considerable freight expense could be saved by dividing the products according to regional demand. These warehouses would later become important branches for Sexton Quality Foods.

In 1924, John Sexton decided to modernize the company's city delivery fleet by purchasing 26 electric trucks from The Commercial Truck Company of America in Philadelphia, and purchasing six gasoline-powered, 1.5 ton, six-wheeled trucks manufactured by Diamond T of Chicago. The modernization retired 50 horses, 35 grocery wagons and saved $12,000 in the first year. Each CT electric truck averaged 12 miles (19 km) per delivery day, and were extremely reliable, easy to drive and well adapted for city deliveries. However, in cold weather, their batteries were less efficient and the hard rubber tires had poor traction on snow-covered streets. The result was a diminished range for the electric trucks. The electric trucks were in service until the late 1930s and were gradually phased out as the Chicago area expanded into the suburbs, the delivery route mileage increased, the roads got better and commercial truck reliability improved. The six Diamond T Trucks were used for suburban Chicago deliveries and averaged 180 miles (290 km) each per delivery day in 1924.

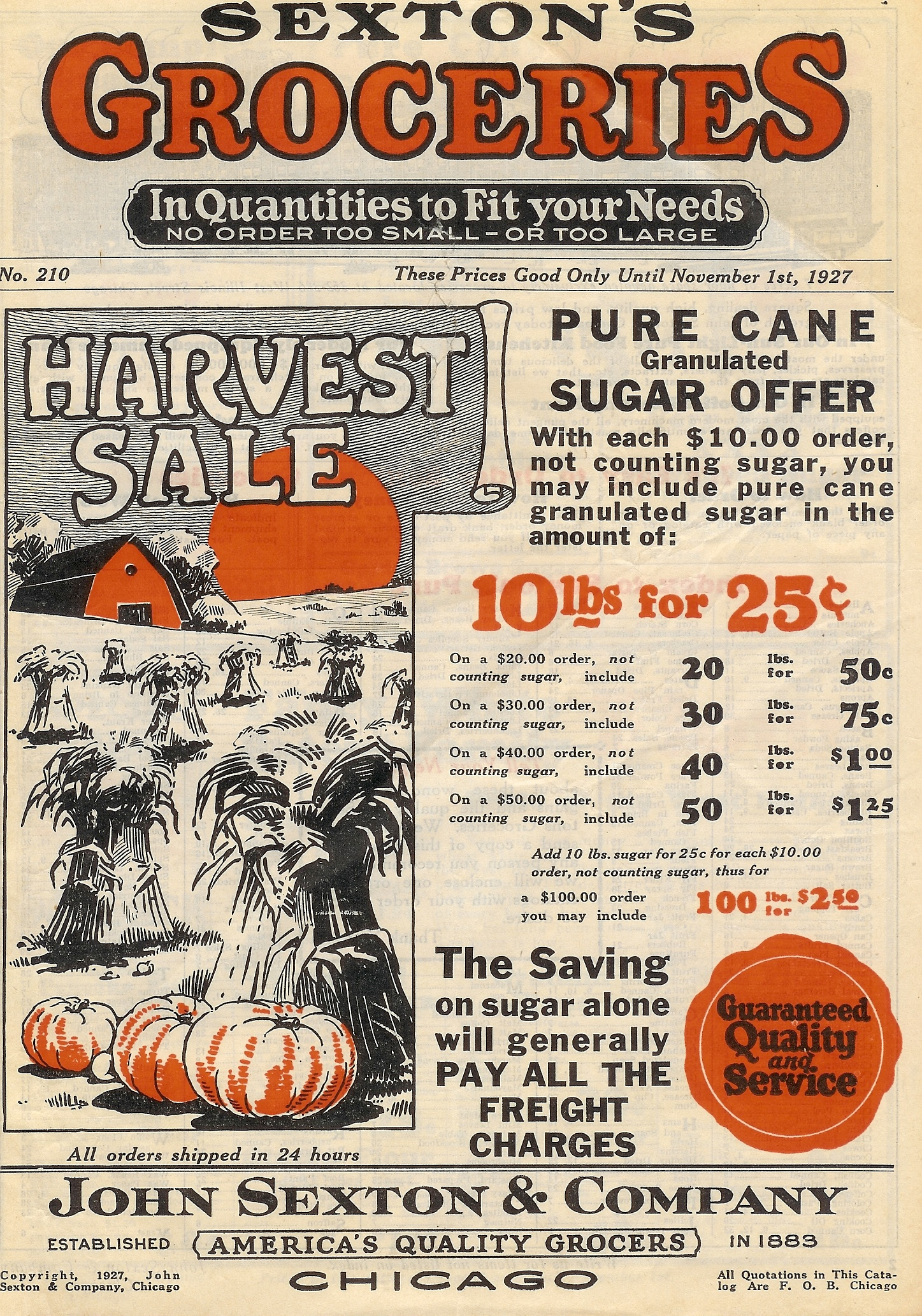
Sexton's mail order catalog 1927

In 1897, Sexton Quality Foods began publishing a mail order catalog, targeted to rural customers, and selling food and farm supplies. Orders were shipped from Chicago via rail to regional terminals where railway express would make the final delivery to the customer. Sexton Quality Foods' catalog business was an important division for years. It was ultimately led by Sexton's second oldest son, Franklin, who later led the coffee and tea division and became the company treasurer. Known as the "Country Division", the majority of the products sold were coffee, spices, flour, canned fruits and canned vegetables. However, paint, motor oil, nails, roof tar and canvas were also sold. The Sexton Country Division flourished until automobiles became affordable and rural automobile ownership increased. Rural customers were then more likely to drive to town to make frequent smaller purchases rather than place large orders from Chicago. The last country division catalog was published in the late 1930s.

=== National expansion ===
In 1928, at age 70, John Sexton stepped down as president of Sexton Quality Foods but remained its chairman. He asked his sons, Thomas, Franklin, and Sherman, who should lead the company. All agreed that Sherman was the best choice, and he became president of the company in 1928. Franklin remained the treasurer and Thomas remained vice president of merchandising. In 1930, at age 71, John Sexton died while on vacation in Los Angeles. After his death, the ownership of the company was divided between John Sexton's wife Annie Louise (33%) and their children Thomas (13.3%), Franklin (13.3%), Sherman (13.3%), Helen (13.3%) and Ethel (13.3%).

By late 1931, the John Sexton & Co. leadership was as follows: Annie Louise (Bartleman) Sexton, chairman; Sherman J. Sexton, president (Sales and Advertising); Harold R. White, vice president (Canned and Dried Foods); Franklin Sexton, secretary (Tea and Coffee); and Edmund A. Egan, treasurer (Maintenance and Operation). In 1933, Sexton Foods opened its first distribution center outside Chicago by renting a warehouse in Brooklyn and buying a delivery fleet of five Diamond T trucks dedicated to the New York market. The New York sales office was then supported by a regional distribution network that could provide next-day delivery. The same year, the first Sexton professional salesman training school was established, led by Henry A. Marten, husband of Ethel.

Sexton Quality Foods expanded its print advertising to the restaurant, college, hospital and food service trade publications in order to directly reach their customers. In addition, Sexton Quality Foods had a sales booth at all major trade conference for hospital administrators, college dietitians and restaurant associations. Sexton also published the first Sexton Cookbook in 1937, with two subsequent cookbooks published in 1941 and 1950. These compiled large-quantity recipes that Sexton customers had developed. Sexton Quality Foods frequently published pamphlets with menu ideas, food suggestions and business hints. Sexton Quality also published annual hardcover diaries that featured customers' recipes.

In January 1941, the company expanded by opening a branch warehouse and truck fleet in Dallas, at 411 Elm Street, the later Texas School Book Depository. In November 1961, Sexton left the building for a modern single-story facility in the Brook Hollow Industrial District located at 650 Regal Row, Dallas, Texas. The Dallas branch would receive railcars of groceries from suppliers, canners and the Sexton Quality Foods Manufacturing Divisions.

In 1941, Sexton introduced a line of frozen fruits and vegetables. The frozen food line was discontinued in mid-1942 due to the United States entering World War II and the need for Sexton to focus on providing groceries to the war effort. In August 1943, John Sexton & C.o purchased the J.C. Stewart Company, an institutional wholesaler, coffee roaster and spice blender located in Pittsburgh. Stewart Company had annual sales of $2 million, had extensive coffee roasting facilities, and was a leading processor of maraschino cherries and spices. Sexton relocated all coffee and spice blending operations to Pittsburgh. The investment banking firm of Floyd D. Cerf Company of Chicago represented Sexton in the transaction. By 1943, Sexton had the ability to supply, manufacture and distribute large amounts of institutional groceries from its warehouses in Chicago, Brooklyn, Dallas and Pittsburgh.

In 1946, Sexton purchased a six-story 110,000-square-foot (10,000 m^{2}) building from stationery supplier Deeps, Inc. The building was located at 32-04 Northern Boulevard, Long Island City, New York and had been originally constructed for the Standard Radiator Co. As World War II ended, the third generation returned from war service and began working for the company. During this time, there were three sons, two son-laws, many cousins and over 25 grandsons working for Sexton Quality Foods.

By 1949, John Sexton & Co. was operating branch warehouses in Atlanta, Chicago, Dallas, Detroit, Long Island City, Philadelphia and Pittsburgh. Territories served by a Sexton salesman, but too remote from a Sexton branch warehouse, received rail shipments directly from Chicago. The majority of Sexton manufacturing was still done at the Chicago facility. However, the chemical manufacturing plant had moved to Philadelphia. The coffee roasting and spice blending operations had moved to Pittsburgh. In 1950, Sexton Quality Foods leased a 130,000-square-foot (12,000 m^{2}) warehouse in San Francisco to support the established west coast sales force and to expand into California, Oregon and Washington.

On December 29, 1951, John Sexton's widow, Annie Louise Sexton, 90 years of age, chairman of John Sexton & Company, died in Miami Beach. At the time of her death, she had 5 children, 25 grandchildren and 62 great-grandchildren. She is buried next to her husband at Calvary Cemetery in Evanston, Illinois.

In January 1953, Sexton purchased the Columbia Conserve Company, a food manufacturer located in Indianapolis. The Sunshine Kitchens relocated to the newly purchased facility. However, Indianapolis grocery orders were still shipped from Chicago. This was because each night, up to six Sexton trucks from the Indianapolis facility would deliver Sexton-manufactured products to the Chicago warehouse and return with the next day's Indianapolis orders.

In October 1953, five grandsons were elected to the board of directors: John S. Marten of Indianapolis, Alfred Egan of Dallas, John P. Sexton of Philadelphia, Thomas W. Sexton of Chicago and William C. Sexton of Chicago. Franklin Sexton, Thomas G. Sexton, Edmund Egan remained as board members. At the close of 1953, Harold R. White, vice president (Canned and Dried Foods) retired after 50 years with the company. Harold was the leading authority on canned and dried foods in the wholesale grocery industry and oversaw Sexton's food quality standards and laboratory. Ora Chidester was elected vice president (Canned and Dried Foods). Matthew Theis, vice president (Manufacturing) retired after 50 years with the company. Harry P. Gaugham was elected vice president (Manufacturing). Franklin Sexton retired as secretary of the company after 47 years of service, but remained a board member. Stanley Wojteczko, company controller was elected secretary of company.

In early 1955, Sexton announced plans to sell the Illinois and Orleans building and construct a new 175,000-square-foot (16,300 m^{2}) warehouse on 7 acres (28,000 m^{2}) at 47th Street and Kilbourne Avenue on the south side. The new warehouse would house the distribution and sales office for Chicago. All food manufacturing was relocated to Indianapolis and the existing Indianapolis plant was enlarged. The John Sexton & Co. building on the corner of Illinois and Orleans was converted to condominiums in the mid-1990s. The terra cotta "JS & Co" logos in the brickwork are still visible.

During the 1950s, Sexton Quality Foods experienced rapid growth as the nation began to dine out more and food service customers demanded quality and consistent products and timely deliveries. By 1958, the company's 75th anniversary, Sexton had a coast-to-coast distribution network with warehouses, sales operations and truck fleets located in Atlanta, Boston, Chicago, Dallas, Detroit, New York, Philadelphia, Pittsburgh and San Francisco to service over 50,000 customers.

=== Leadership succession ===
On March 13, 1956, 63-year-old Sherman Sexton died unexpectedly of an aneurysm. He is buried at All Saints Cemetery in Des Plaines. Sherman had begun work for his father at the Lake and Franklin location as a Teamster in 1909 and his career had spanned 47 years. Sherman had led the company from a Chicago-based grocery mail order house to a coast-to-coast foodservice distributor with over $40 million in sales. His untimely death created enormous turmoil since there was no clear succession for company leadership. 65-year-old Thomas G. Sexton stepped in as president. Brothers Thomas, Franklin and Sherman had all joined the Teamsters Union on the same day in 1909. Tom had been vice president in charge of merchandising since 1926. In late 1956, Beatrice Foods approached Thomas G. Sexton and Ethel Marten (daughter of John Sexton) with an offer to purchase John Sexton & Co.; both declined.

In March 1959, the board of directors held a special election for a new company president. The four candidates were Thomas G. Sexton, Thomas Webb Sexton (son of Thomas G.), John S. Marten (son of Ethel) and Thomas Mackin ("Mack") Sexton (son of Franklin). Mack Sexton won the vote and became president in 1959. Thomas G. Sexton became chairman of the board. Again, Beatrice approached John Sexton & Co. with an offer to purchase the company; Mack Sexton declined the offer.

=== Sexton goes public ===
On November 16, 1960, John Sexton & Co issued 200,000 shares (26.76%) of the 747,437 shares outstanding at $16.50 per share in the over the counter market (NASDAQ) to become a public company. 33,000 of the shares represented new financing of the company for use as working capital. The 200,000 share offer were oversubscribed and closed at $16.50 per share. Hornblower & Weeks was the managing underwriter. The financial structure of the company had evolved from its humble beginnings as a partnership formed in Chicago in 1883 to a public company with 747,437 shares outstanding with 72% held by family members and 26.76% held by the public.

The desire for John Sexton & Co. to go public was to gain better access to the commercial credit market. Sexton's management saw the opportunity to expand product lines and distribution networks, but its capital structure as a private company limited its borrowing capacity. As a public company, Sexton capital stock could be issued to purchase other grocery companies and fund expansion. In addition, the Sexton family held the majority of their wealth in the private John Sexton & Co. stock. Some family members wanted a publicly traded stock which could easily be sold at a true market price. The alternative was to try to sell their Sexton shares to another family member at a negotiated price.

In 1961 John Sexton & Co. had over 1,400 employees, including 300 salesmen who were generating $49.5 million. 10 Sexton distribution warehouses were located in Atlanta; Chicago; Dallas; Detroit; Englewood, New Jersey; Indianapolis; Newton, Massachusetts; Pittsburgh; Philadelphia; and San Francisco.

Sexton serviced over 50,000 customers located throughout the US, of which 40% were restaurants, 28% were schools and colleges, and 32% consisted of clubs, hospitals, convents and hotels.

The Sexton catalogue included over 2,250 food and non-food items, of which 26% were manufactured in Sexton manufacturing facilities located in Indianapolis and Englewood. The rest of the Sexton products were manufactured by non-affiliated third parties.

The Sexton delivery fleet consisted of 112 trucks and tractor-trailer combinations, of which 95 were owned by the company and the remainder leased. In certain areas of the country, Sexton utilized common carriers to deliver their products.

Sexton was focused on meeting the rising demand from their customers as America began to embrace away-from-home eating as entertainment. To meet the increased demand, Sexton began modernizing its warehouses and manufacturing facilities.

As of June 30, 1961, John Sexton & Co. was generating $49.5 million in sales and the balance sheet had current assets of $15.4 million with liabilities of $4.9 million including $3.9 million of long term debt, $1.0 million of accounts payable and working capital of $10.5 million consisting of short term revolving credit lines. Book value was $16.57 per share. Dividends had consistently been paid since 1935 and in 1961 were paying $0.90 per share.

In July 1961, Franklin Sexton, secretary of the company, son of John Sexton, died at age 70. He had begun his career on State Street store in 1909 working for his father, John Sexton, as a Teamster making grocery deliveries in Chicago by horse and wagon. He oversaw the expansion of the country division, expansion of Sexton's national distribution network, the building of the Sexton plant on Illinois & Orleans and led the Sexton coffee and tea product lines. His career spanned over 50 years. He is buried at Calvary Cemetery in Evanston, Illinois.

On October 4, 1961, John Sexton & Co. conducted a secondary offering of 70,000 share of stock at $23.50 per share at the request of the Ethel Sexton Marten Family and the Franklin Sexton Estate. The Marten family sold 49,924 of 50,924 shares and the Franklin Sexton Estate sold 20,076 of 57,436 shares. Hornblower & Weeks was the managing underwriter. The Marten family, led by sons John S. Marten and Harry Marten, left the company and purchased Fred's Frozen Foods, a food manufacturer located in Noblesville, Indiana.

=== Focus on growth ===
In 1961, Sexton announced a major capital plan to add product lines, expand into new territories and modernize its distribution system. New warehouses were built or leased in Dallas, Pittsburgh, Detroit, San Francisco and Philadelphia. Plans to roll out a computer-based inventory and accounting system were established. In 1962, John Sexton & Co. and S.E. Rykoff & Co. of Los Angeles entered negotiation where Sexton Quality Foods would purchase Rykoff in a stock and debt assumption transaction. Rykoff had a very strong presence in the Los Angeles foodservice market that was attractive to Sexton Foods. Sexton Foods preferred to purchase a strong local market leader, rather than starting from scratch, since a new market could be penetrated much faster. Sexton Foods and S.E. Rykoff were not able to reach agreement. After which, Sexton Quality Foods announced plans to open a 30,000-square-foot (2,800 m^{2}) warehouse and Sexton truck fleet in the Compton warehouse district of Los Angeles to support the southern California and Nevada Sexton sales force. Also in 1962, the Long Island City Sexton warehouse building was sold and Sexton relocated to a modern distribution and manufacturing facility located at 360 Van Brunt St, Englewood, New Jersey

In 1964, Sexton purchased the institutional wholesale grocery department of National Brands Inc. located in Miami, Florida. A Sexton Warehouse was established in Miami that year. In 1965, Sexton purchased Cincinnati Foods, Inc., an institutional wholesaler located in Cincinnati, Ohio and a Sexton Warehouse was opened.

In 1965, Sexton began a capital investment in data processing to transition away from the traditional ledger inventory control and accounting. Using the IBM System/360 mainframe, Sexton designed a software system to automate inventory records, customer billing and accounts receivable. To insure a smooth transition, the automated accounting system was rolled out branch by branch during 1965. The data processing center was located in the general offices in Chicago.

In 1967, John Sexton & Co. operated 12 branch warehouses, which served over 79,000 customers throughout the continental United States, in the West Indies and Hawaii. Sexton branch warehouses were located in Atlanta, Boston (Newton, Massachusetts), Chicago, Cincinnati, Dallas, Detroit, Los Angeles, New York (Englewood, New Jersey), Orlando, Philadelphia, Pittsburgh and San Francisco. These branches and the 370 sales territories covered 500 of the major US metropolitan areas where 90% of all restaurants, schools, hospitals and foodservice customers were located. Approximately, 70% of all foodservice purchases were made through route salesmen or telephone orders. By 1967, 31% of foodservice customers purchased 76% of the food volume due to regional and national chains. The balance of the foodservice purchases was from small independent restaurants, schools, hospitals and foodservice providers. Sexton's quality products, national distribution network and sales force allowed it to provide the service that the varied customers demanded.

In 1967, nearly all 2,250 products distributed by Sexton were sold under its own trade names, brands and labels. Products included a broad line of canned foods, canned and processed meats, coffee, tea spice and paper products, everything except frozen foods, meat, milk and fresh produce. About 27 percent of the products distributed by Sexton were manufactured, processed, packed, bottled, or canned in Sexton manufacturing plants, the balance of the Sexton products were purchased from other food manufacturers. To insure high quality foods, Sexton had operated food laboratories since the 1890s for the systematic testing of "quality" in the products it produced, the products it distributed and for the development of new products. By July 1, 1967, Sexton had developed and placed on the market a number of new convenience products including "Jet Set", an instant gelatin, canned "Chopped Chicken Livers" and "Spoon-Redi", a line of puddings to be spooned directly from the can into dessert dishes. Although frozen and refrigerated food products were explored by Sexton, the majority of the foodservice customers in 1967 had yet to invest in cold storage in their kitchens.

=== Sale to Beatrice Foods ===
In 1968, Mack Sexton was approached by Beatrice Foods with an offer to purchase the John Sexton & Co. Beatrice Foods was attracted to Sexton Quality Foods’ distribution network, quality, variety of private label products, specialized food offerings, sales force and profitability. Mack Sexton's initial response was no, but Beatrice Foods was very interested. Eventually both parties reached an agreement. Beatrice Foods increased the purchase, pledged capital to expand Sexton Quality Foods distribution network, pledged capital to introduce a new Sexton frozen product line and pledged that the Sexton leadership would continue to lead and operate the company as a separate entity. On December 20, 1968, Beatrice Foods acquired the business and assets of John Sexton & Co., exchanging approximately 375,000 shares of Beatrice's preferred convertible preference stock valued at $37,500,000. John Sexton & Co. would become a separate independent division of Beatrice Foods still led by Mack Sexton (son of Franklin), William Egan (son of Helen) and William Sexton (son of Sherman). Mack became a vice president of Beatrice and a Beatrice board member. John Sexton & Co. put Beatrice Foods into the wholesale grocery business and Beatrice put John Sexton & Co. into the frozen foods business. Beatrice Foods and the Sexton leadership were interested in maximizing the investment in John Sexton & Co. by growing the company. In 1969, rather than proceeding with the original Sexton Quality Foods plan to acquire a frozen food manufacturer, Sexton tapped Beatrice Foods frozen foods expertise and capital to launch a Sexton frozen product line that included frozen meats, fruits, vegetables and ethnic entrees. Sexton Quality Foods new frozen line required the addition of industrial freezer storage to all 12-branch warehouses and retrofitting all delivery trucks with freezers. Over the next 4 years, six of the eight planned additional Sexton branch warehouses were opened in Hawaii, Indianapolis, Houston, Saint Louis, Seattle and Minneapolis.

In January 1978, Thomas G. Sexton, son of the founder, retired president and chairman of the company died at the age of 88 at his home in Buffalo Grove, Illinois. Tom Sexton began work for his father in 1909 at the Lake & Franklin location. His first job was as a teamster delivering grocery in Chicago by horse and wagon. His career spanned 51 years until his retirement in 1959.

Beatrice Foods operated John Sexton & Co. as an independent division until 1983. Mack Sexton remained president of John Sexton & Co., a vice president of Beatrice and had a seat on the Beatrice board of directors until his retirement in 1981. A legal side note, Mack Sexton was the defendant in the first successful age discrimination case. Beatrice allegedly pressured Mack to improve business results. Mack decided to remove family members from the company. On January 24, 1977, Mack Sexton, president of the Sexton Division, called his cousin William C. Sexton (son of Sherman J.) into his office and discharged him, indicating that more aggressive "younger blood" was required for management. William Sexton was 59 years old and a 41-year employee. Please see Sexton v. Beatrice Foods for more information. By the early 1980s Beatrice Foods was a $12 billion far-reaching multinational corporation with diverse holdings including Avis Rent A Car, Shedd's, Tropicana, Good & Plenty, Swift's Premium (including Butterball Turkey), Culligan, Rusty Jones, Samsonite Luggage and Playtex. Beatrice Foods had increasingly focused on divisions that yielded the larger profit margins than food, which typically yields consistent 2% to 3% profit margins. As a result, Beatrice Foods withheld capital investment into its food divisions.

=== Sale to S.E. Rykoff & Co. ===
After many years of buying companies, Beatrice Foods began the process of divesting. In 1983, Beatrice Foods announce that it was divesting 50 business of which, John Sexton & Co. was generating $380 million in sales which represented a 10% annual revenue growth since its purchase in 1967.

The CEO of S.E. Rykoff & Co., Roger Coleman, approached Beatrice with an offer to buy John Sexton & Co. Beatrice initially said no. In 1983, S.E. Rykoff & Co. ($346 million in sales) was a broad line grocer and restaurant equipment provider that operated in California, Nevada, Oregon, Washington and Hawaii. Rykoff had begun in 1911 as a family grocery store located near Union Station in downtown Los Angeles. In 1919, Saul Rykoff dropped his retail customers and focused exclusively on wholesale customers. In 1972 S.E. Rykoff & Co. went public and the shares were traded in the over the counter market (NASDAQ).

S.E. Rykoff & Co. CEO, Roger Coleman persuaded Beatrice Foods to sell John Sexton & Co. for $84 million. With the purchase of Sexton Quality Foods, Rykoff double in size, gained a national distribution network of 18 warehouses, a national sales force, recognized brand name, a loyal customer base, food manufacturing facilities, food laboratories, test kitchens, chemical manufacturing facilities, a coffee roasting plant and a spice blending operation. The Sexton Quality Foods west coast branches in Seattle, Los Angeles, San Francisco and Hawaii were absorbed into the Rykoff operations. Sexton Quality Foods branches in the south, Midwest, east and south continued to operate under the Sexton banner. In 1984, to reflect the importance of the Sexton Foods acquisition, S.E. Rykoff & Co. changed the company name to Rykoff-Sexton. However, Rykoff-Sexton continued to operate Sexton Quality Foods and Rykoff as two separate companies since merging the two companies was a complex task that involved customers, labor, systems, brands, products and corporate identity.

=== Rykoff-Sexton and US Foodservice merge ===
By the early 1990s, Rykoff-Sexton had successfully merged the two separate operating companies and was labeling the majority of the products under the Rykoff-Sexton banner. The result was better operating efficiencies, economies of scale and recognizable brand name. In 1995, Rykoff-Sexton relocated the headquarters from Los Angeles to Lisle, Illinois. Rykoff-Sexton was generating $1.6 billion in annual sales, which represented a 7% annual revenue growth rate since 1984.

By the mid-1990s, the restaurant industry had further evolved into a chain system which demanded consistent, ready-to-assemble food products. Large national restaurant chains wanted to deal with one large national food distributor that could reliably provide products to their exact specifications. Rykoff-Sexton's management had decided that the best strategy was to strategically purchase other broad line grocers and grow revenue. During the mid-1990s, Rykoff-Sexton purchased Continental Foods of Baltimore for an undisclosed price and H&O Foods of Las Vegas for $5.5 million in cash and assumption of $26.6 million in debt.

In February 1996, Rykoff-Sexton and US Foodservice of Wilkes-Barre, Pennsylvania announced their intent to merge. The merger was unanimously approved by the boards of directors of both companies. In 1996, US Foodservice was generating $1.5 billion in revenue and Rykoff-Sexton was generating $2 billion. The merger would combine the third and fourth largest U.S. broadline foodservice distributors with combined annual sales of approximately $3.5 billion. The 8.8 million shares of US Foodservice were exchanged for $270 million in Rykoff-Sexton stock. The $350 million in US Foodservice debt was assumed by Rykoff-Sexton. Rykoff-Sexton (RYK) funded the purchase by issuing 14.3 million new shares at $25 per share. In September 1996, the newly merged Rykoff-Sexton/US Foodservice announced that corporate headquarters would be relocated to Wilkes-Barre.

=== Merger with JP Foodservice ===
In 1997, Rykoff-Sexton/US Foodservice was generating $3.2 billion in annual sales. The combined company was in the process of re-branding all products to the US Foodservice brand by dropping the Rykoff-Sexton, S.E. Rykoff & Co. and John Sexton & Co. brands. It was determined that a standardized and easily recognizable brand would better compete in the rapidly consolidating foodservice market. In addition, the US Foodservice brand would reflect a nationwide presence and distribution capabilities. During this time, the company headquarters were moved to Wilkes-Barre, Pennsylvania.

In July 1997, JP Foodservice and Rykoff-Sexton/US Foodservice reached an agreement to merge the two companies. Rykoff-Sexton/US Foodservice shareholders would exchange their Rykoff-Sexton/US Foodservice stock for JP Foodservice stock. All outstanding Rykoff-Sexton/US Foodservice shares were exchanged for $680 million in JP Foodservice stock. The $700 million in Rykoff-Sexton/US Foodservice debt was assumed by the merged Rykoff-Sexton/US Foodservice-JP Foodservice balance sheet.

In 1997, JP Foodservice was generating about $2 billion in annual sales primarily focused on the east coast. Rykoff-Sexton/US Foodservice was generating $3.2 billion in annual sales from its national distribution network and its manufacturing divisions. After the merger, the combined Rykoff-Sexton/US Foodservice-JP Foodservice operating company generated $5 billion in annual sales in 1997.

=== US Foodservice ===
In early 1998, the merged company Rykoff-Sexton-JP Foodservice changed its name to US Foodservice (USF) and dropped all Rykoff-Sexton-JP Foodservices brands and logos. In addition, US Foodservice focused exclusively on sales, marketing and distribution.

To help fund the merger, US Foodservice sold the Rykoff-Sexton Manufacturing Division (RSMD) to the private equity firm of Kohlberg & Company and RSMD senior management. RSMD manufactured over 1,400 food and non-food items and generated about $115 million in 1997. RSMD had manufacturing plants in Los Angeles (S.E. Rykoff & Co.), which manufactured non-food items such as detergents, cleaning compounds, refuse container liners, cutlery, straws and sandwich bags, paper napkins, placemats, chefs' hats, coasters, paper lace doilies and a line of low-temperature dishwashers. The plant in Englewood, New Jersey (Sexton Foods) manufactured coffee and spices. The 1800 Churchman Avenue plant in Indianapolis, Indiana (Sexton Quality Foods) manufactured more than 500 items including canned products, frozen products, refrigerated products, powdered products, shortenings/oils, dressings, sauces, syrups, flavorings, dry mixes, and soup bases. RSMD supplied Rykoff-Sexton/US Foodservice and also did some contract manufacturing for restaurant chains and other private label brands.

The new company would operate under the name United Signature Foods L.L.C. Prior to the purchase, Kohlberg & Company required US Foodservice to enter into a six-year supply contract with U.S. Foods LLC that increased 6% over the term. Gross proceeds from the supply agreement and asset sale totaled $101 million. Even with the sale of RSMD, some John Sexton & Co. signature products live on. For instance, US Foodservice still markets Alamo Zestful Seasonings, Jamaica Relish (developed by Sexton Food Chef Tony Bartolotta), Chunky Blue Cheese Dressing, and Kettle Rich soups.

In 2000, US Foodservice was acquired by Dutch grocer Royal Ahold for $26 per share or $3.6 billion and the assumption of all outstanding US Foodservice debt. In 2006, Ahold stated that US Foodservice was generating $19.2 billion in sales.

In 2007, Royal Ahold sold US Foodservice through a $7.2 billion leverage buyout conducted by Clayton, Dubilier & Rice and KKR (KKR had purchased Beatrice Foods, once the owner of Sexton, in 1986). As of June 2007, US Foodservice is jointly owned by Clayton, Dubilier & Rice and KKR.

In 2009, US Foodservice was still privately held, and was the second largest broadline foodservice distributor in the U.S. with $18.97 billion in revenue and 24,687 employees. SYSCO was the largest foodservice distributor.

== See also ==
- U.S. Foodservice
- S.E. Rykoff
- Sysco
