= Robert Harrison (financier) =

American banker

Robert S. Harrison is an American banker, lawyer, and educational & philanthropic administrator.

He is Interim Chief Executive Officer of the Clinton Foundation and previously was CEO of the Clinton Global Initiative from 2007 to 2016. Before that, he was the first Executive Director of the Clinton Foundation’s childhood obesity initiative from 2005 to 2007. He has been a member of the Clinton Foundation's Board of Directors since 2018. He was chairman of the Cornell University Board of Trustees from 2011 to 2022, and a trustee since 2002.

Harrison received a bachelor's degree from Cornell University in 1976, and subsequently was a Rhodes Scholar at University of Oxford and received a Juris Doctor from Yale University.

At Cornell, Harrison was a student member of the university Board of Trustees, active in student government, a disc jockey at WVBR-FM, brother of Sigma Phi, and member of the Quill and Dagger society.

He joined Goldman Sachs in 1987, where he became a partner in the firm’s investment banking division and global co-head of its Communications, Media, and Entertainment group until 2003. From 1981 to 1987, Harrison practiced corporate law in the New York and Paris offices of Davis, Polk and Wardwell.

He also fundraised for the presidential campaigns of Wesley Clark and John Kerry.

Harrison is a Trustee of the Rhodes Trust, a Director of the Association of American Rhodes Scholars and the Clinton Foundation, Chairman Emeritus of the Henry Street Settlement Board of Directors, and is a member of the Council on Foreign Relations.

Academic offices
Preceded by Peter C. Meinig	Chairman of Cornell Board of Trustees; 2011-2022	Succeeded by Kraig H. Kayser
