= Harold Tanner =

American banker (1932–2025)

Harold Tanner (1932 – June 14, 2025) was an American investment banker and philanthropist.

== Background ==
Tanner was born in 1932. He graduated from the Cornell University School of Industrial and Labor Relations in 1952 and earned an MBA from Harvard University in 1956.

Tanner died in New York City on June 14, 2025, at the age of 93.

== Charitable activities ==
Tanner was a longtime member of the American Jewish Committee's board of governors and served the human relations organization as chair of its board of trustees, member of its executive committee, and from 2001 to 2004 as its president. He served as chairman of the AJC Transatlantic Institute. From 2005 to 2007, he served as chairman of the Conference of Presidents of Major Jewish Organizations.

Tanner served as a Cornell trustee beginning in 1982, including as vice-chairman of the board and chairman from 1997 to 2002. He served on the trustee executive committee from 1986 to 2002.

== Awards ==
Tanner was a recipient of:

- Herbert Lehman Award of the American Jewish Committee in 1995.
- A Foremost benefactor of Cornell.
- Harvard Business School Alumni Achievement Award in 1992.
- Cornell ILR Jerome Alpern Distinguished Alumni Award in 2002.

Academic offices
Preceded by Stephen H. Weiss	Chairman of Cornell Board of Trustees; 1997–2002	Succeeded by Peter C. Meinig
