= Peter C. Meinig =

American business executive

Peter C. Meinig (1939 – September 25, 2017) was an American business executive and a trustee at Cornell University. Along with his friend and business partner, Richard Hojel, he founded HM International, a diversified investment holding company. Meinig served as the company’s long-time Chairman and CEO.

Meinig received a BME degree in 1962 from Cornell University and an MBA in 1964 from Harvard University. At Cornell, he joined the International Fraternity of Phi Gamma Delta (Fiji). In May 2007, Meinig donated $25 million to fund research grants to Cornell faculty in the life sciences and in 2015 he and his wife donated another $50 million to create the Meinig School of Biomedical Engineering. Meinig was also a member of the Sphinx Head Society.

Academic offices
Preceded by Harold Tanner	Chairman of Cornell Board of Trustees; 2002–2011	Succeeded by Robert Harrison
