= S.E. Rykoff =

American national wholesale grocer

S.E. Rykoff & Co.
- Type: Public company
- Founded: 1911, 1950
- Fate: Merged with JP Foodservice 1997 to form US Foodservice. Operates today as US Foods.
- Headquarters: Rosemont, Illinois
- Products: Food service, restaurant equipment & kitchen design

S.E. Rykoff & Co., also known as SERCO, was a broad line national wholesale grocer that serviced the restaurant, hotel and institutional trade from regional warehouses, sale forces and truck fleets located primarily on the west coast of the United States. S.E. Rykoff & Co. eventually became US Foods in 1997 by merging with JP Foodservice. The company traces its roots to a small family grocery store opened by Harry and Ida Rykoff in Los Angeles, California in 1911.

== Early history ==
The Harry and Ida Rykoff Family moved from Sioux City, Iowa, to Los Angeles in 1910. The family opened a small grocery store near Union Station in downtown Los Angeles. They had nine children. In 1919, their son Saul returned from military service in World War I and rejoined his parents’ grocery store. Saul realized that selling food by the wagon load to large users was better business than selling to individuals. Saul proposed that the family focus on wholesaling. The company, S.E. Rykoff & Co., is named after Saul. Its slogan was "Home of the Gallon Goods", which referred to the foodservice industry #10 can size. Saul focused on distributing to restaurants and other institutional customers of canned goods and dry groceries in and around Los Angeles. S.E. Rykoff & Co. was incorporated in 1950. Saul E. Rykoff died April 26, 1967, and was survived by his wife Saragrace and three children Thomas, Stephen and Ruth Coleman.

S.E. Rykoff & Co. New 1967 GMC Truck Fleet at the main Rykoff distribution center located on Terminal Street Los Angeles, California.

== S.E. Rykoff & Co. expansion ==
On June 15, 1967, Saul's son-in-law Roger Coleman was elected president and chief executive officer of S.E. Rykoff & Co. Coleman had been a board member of the company since 1960. In 1969, Rykoff was generating about $900k in profits on sales of $54 million. Coleman believed that expanding Rykoff's distribution network, sales force and product offerings were the best way to increase value of the company. Rather than relying solely on internal expansion, Coleman initiated the strategy of acquiring small regional wholesale distributors in markets that Rykoff wanted to enter. Roger Coleman viewed it far easier to buy an establish wholesale grocery company in a new territory rather than build a sale force and distribution network from scratch. In 1969, Rykoff purchased S&W Fine Foods of San Francisco (later acquired by Del Monte Foods). To fund the acquisition and internal growth strategy and to satisfy the Rykoff family members looking for liquidity, S.E. Rykoff & Co. became a public company. In October 1972, S.E. Rykoff & Co. issued 400,000 shares at $25 par value in the over the counter market (NASDAQ). S.E. Rykoff & Co. was generating $1.9 million in profits with revenue of $75.9 million. 200,000 shares were used to repay short-term debt and to augment working capital. The remaining 200,000 shares were sold by family members.

With the new access to capital and less of the Rykoff Family involvement, S.E. Rykoff & Co. purchased Louis Enders a Brooklyn, New York based food product supplier that distributed in New York, New Jersey and Connecticut. In the Enders deal structure, S.E. Rykoff & Co. exchanged 130,000 share of company stock for ownership of Louis Enders business and operating assets. Louis Enders management was kept in place and S.E. Rykoff & Co. products were added. In March 1973, S.E. Rykoff & Co. purchased the assets of Schuss Wholesale Grocery Company of Portland, Oregon. In addition, S.E. Rykoff & Co. purchased the southern California and Arizona coffee distribution business of General Foods for an undisclosed amount. In 1974, S.E. Rykoff & Co. purchased Reliable Glassware & Equipment Co. of Los Angeles ($1.5 million in sales) for an undisclosed amount of cash. That same year, S.E. Rykoff & Co. purchased C.L. Chaban Co. ($2 million in sales) a San Francisco distributor of restaurant supplies and equipment.

Even though S.E. Rykoff & Co. was busy integrating these acquired companies into SERCO, Roger Coleman was focused on internal growth by expanding product lines and increasing the commission based Rykoff sales force. Between 1972 and 1974, S.E. Rykoff & Co. expanded the sales force from 250 to 300 salesmen. In 1974, S.E. Rykoff & Co. obtained the bulk of its sales (78%) from food items. It did not distribute meat, produce or dairy. Rykoff produced a very limited amount of its own products chiefly pancake syrups, barbecue sauces and mayonnaise at its downtown Los Angeles warehouse. The majority of its food products were canned and dried goods packed by other food companies. Rykoff distributed a very limited amount of frozen foods. About 14% of Rykoff's sales came from paper goods and chemicals. The remainder was from glassware and restaurant equipment.

By 1975, S.E. Rykoff & Co. was generating $163 million in sales with $5.1 million in profits, had 1,220 employees with 930 in California. Rykoff distributed in California, Alaska, Hawaii, Nevada, Oregon and through the Louis Ender division on the east coast. Under Roger W. Coleman, CEO leadership, S.E. Rykoff & Co. had tripled its revenue and increased profits by 500% in less than 10 years.

In April 1976, S.E. Rykoff & Co. announced plans to build a new 250,000-square-foot (23,000 m^{2}) distribution center in the Bay Area of San Francisco with delivery in October 1977. The new distribution center replaced the 70,000-square-foot (6,500 m^{2}) center that was acquired with the purchase of C.L. Chaban Co. in 1973. The new distribution center would provide much better service to Rykoff’s customers in the Bay Area, northern and central California.

In September 1977, S.E. Rykoff & Co. purchased the business and assets of Food Service and Design Corp. of Boston for an undisclosed sum. Roger W. Coleman’s vision was to expand Rykoff’s foodservice equipment sales on the east coast by providing kitchen and restaurant design. Foodservice equipment such as dish washers, ranges, ovens, mixers etc. have much higher margins than wholesale groceries. In addition, Rykoff’s equipment customers tended to purchase their groceries for Rykoff.

In 1979, S.E. Rykoff & Co. decided to close the metropolitan New York Division. Rykoff originally expanded into the New York market by purchasing the Louis Ender food company. The distance between Los Angeles and New York proved too much from a management stand point. The division had lost money between 1976 and 1978. A strike in early 1979 by the Teamsters would result in continued losses, the result was S.E. Rykoff & Co. decided to close the operations.

By 1981, the entire US foodservice industry was $51 billion and the largest foodservice distributor only had 3% of the market. S.E. Rykoff & Co. was the largest foodservice distributor on the west coast. The company was generating $315 million in sales and had over 500 salesmen working on 40% commission. 65% of Rykoff’s sales were from house brands and 35% from nonfood items like glassware, cooking equipment and restaurant supplies. At this time, Roger W. Coleman, CEO was on recorded saying that he believed that the wholesale food industry would not consolidate and no company would dominate nationally, largely because of great regional differences.

== S.E. Rykoff & Co. purchase John Sexton & Co. ==
New combined Rykoff-Sexton company logo 1983.

Roger W. Coleman approached Beatrice Foods with an offer to purchase John Sexton & Co. in 1982. Beatrice had purchased Sexton in 1968 for $37.5 million and had operated it as an independent company. In 1982, Sexton had revenue of $380 million with net income of $12 million compared to Rykoff's $346 million with net income of $4.5 million. Coleman saw an opportunity to gain a brand name, product line, national distribution network, manufacturing division and a sales force at a very attractive price. S.E. Rykoff & Co. bought John Sexton & Co. in 1983 $84 million from Beatrice Foods. At the time, it was the largest food service acquisition. Coleman realized that the S.E. Rykoff & Co. Brand was only known on the west coast where the Sexton Brand was known nationwide by institutional food customers. John Sexton & Co. had been distributing nationwide since 1897 and was well known as providing quality foods, reliable service and privately manufactured food items. Coleman convinced the S.E. Rykoff & Co. board of directors to rename the company Rykoff-Sexton. By 1986, Rykoff-Sexton took fourth place among foodservice distributors with $800 million in sales.

== CEO Roger W. Coleman retires ==
Roger W. Coleman, Rykoff-Sexton Inc. CEO 1989

In December 1992, Roger W. Coleman retired after 42 years with S.E. Rykoff & Co., 25 years as CEO. Coleman led S.E. Rykoff & Co. from a family-owned west coast regional wholesaler grocer to a national wholesale grocer with over $1 billion in annual revenue. Coleman's vision of buying regional wholesale grocers and integrating them under one banner would be repeated in the mid-1990s by other wholesale grocery executives. Rykoff-Sexton board member and executive vice president, Mark Van Stekelenburg, 41 years old, succeeded the 63-year-old Mr. Coleman. Mr. Van Stekelenburg joined Rykoff-Sexton in March 1990, and previously headed a unit of Royal Ahold NV, a food service distributor in the Netherlands. The company headquarters was moved to Lisle, IL.

== Rykoff-Sexton pursues acquisitions ==
In 1996, under the leadership of Mark Van Stekelenburg, Rykoff-Sexton Inc. bought Continental Foods of Baltimore, MD, H&O Foods of Las Vegas, NV, and US Foodservice of Wilkes-Barre, PA . Rykoff-Sexton Inc. was now operating a national foodservice distribution division (d.b.a. "US Foodservice" with the businesses and assets of Sexton Foods, S.E. Rykoff & Co. and US Foodservice), a private label manufacturing division (Sexton Foods ), a foodservice contract and design division (Finegolds), and a foodservice equipment and supply division (S.E. Rykoff & Co.).

In 1997, Rykoff-Sexton (RYK) was generating $3.2 billion in annual sales and was in the process of re-branding all products to the US Foodservice brand by dropping the Rykoff-Sexton, S.E. Rykoff & Co. and John Sexton & Co. brands. It was determined that a standardized and easily recognizable brand would reflect a nationwide presence and distribution capabilities to better compete in the rapidly consolidating foodservice market. Ryoff-Sexton realized that it had to grow revenue and distribution presence or be squeezed out by Sysco the largest foodservice distributor in the United States with $14.45 billion in sales for fiscal 1997. During this time, the company headquarters were moved to Wilkes-Barre, PA from Lisle, IL.

== Rykoff-Sexton Merges with JP Foodservice ==
In July 1997, JP Foodservice ($1.7 billion in revenue) and Rykoff-Sexton ($3.2 billion in revenue) reached an agreement to merge in order to create a larger single brand to better compete in a rapidly consolidating industry. JP Foodservice (JPF) exchanged $680 million in company JPF stock for all outstanding Rykoff-Sexton shares and the assumption of $700 million in Rykoff-Sexton debt (total deal value of $1.38 billion) . All individual brands were dropped in favor of the US Foodservice brand. The merger created a larger national foodservice company with $5 billion annual sales (1997).

The Rykoff-Sexton brand remains the lead brand for a number of US Foods product lines, notably their coffee catalog. The brand usually appears without a hyphen.

== US Foodservice purchased by Ahold ==
In 2000, US Foodservice was bought by Ahold for $3.6 billion in cash.

== Ahold sells US Foodservice to KKR ==
In 2007, Ahold sells all US Foodservice assets to private equity firm KKR.

KKR operates US Foodservice as one its profolio companies with the most likely eventual plan to "cash out" US Foodservice by issuing shares on the New York Stock Exchange and paying off the acquisition debt.
