= HM International =

HM International, LLC
- Company type: Private company
- Industry: holding company
- Founded: 1979
- Headquarters: Tulsa, Oklahoma, US
- Key people: Peter C Meinig (Chairman/CEO)
- Products: Frozen foods, machining, on-line learning, petroleum industry data transmission equipment, natural gas pipelines, geothermal equipment
- Revenue: $650 million (2009)

HM International, LLC (HMI) is a partnership representing the joint interests of the Hojel and Meinig families. The partnership was initiated in 1979 with the objective of acquiring undervalued assets and creating value through strong, decentralized management and long-term investment focus. Peter C. Meinig was the company's chairman and chief executive officer.

HMI is the majority owner of the following companies:

- Windsor Quality Food Company (frozen food manufacturing)
- PGI International (machining)
- Ninth House (online learning)
- American Innovations (data transmission)
- IGASAMEX (Mexican natural gas pipelines)
- EnLink Geoenergy Services (geothermal equipment)
