= Fred's Frozen Foods =

Brand of frozen food

- Type: Private company
- Industry: Food manufacturing
- Founded: 1947; 79 years ago
- Headquarters: Noblesville, Indiana
- Products: Frozen food

Fred's Frozen Foods (also marketed as Fred's for Starters) is a frozen food brand founded in Noblesville, Indiana in 1947 by entrepreneur Fred W. Luker. Originally focused on frozen meat patties and breaded vegetables for the wholesale foodservice industry, the brand changed ownership multiple times over the following decades. As of 2002, both brands were operated by Windsor Quality Food Company, Ltd., ultimately owned by the Hojel and Meinig families of Tulsa, Oklahoma through their holding company HM International, LLC.

== History ==
=== Founding and early years (1947–1961) ===
Fred W. Luker was an entrepreneur and inventor who established Fred's Frozen Foods in 1947 in Noblesville, Indiana, to supply frozen meat patties and breaded vegetables to the wholesale foodservice industry. As American consumers began dining away from home more frequently, Luker's business grew alongside its foodservice customers.

In the late 1950s, Luker developed a technique for applying a coating of breadcrumbs to a slice of raw meat and then compressing the slice under pressure to embed the crumbs deeply and evenly into the surface. The result was a processed meat patty approximately 150% larger than the original slice. Luker filed a patent application for this process in January 1962, which was granted in 1965.

By the early 1960s, Luker was approaching retirement age and seeking a buyer for his company, which was generating approximately $500,000 per year in sales.

=== Marten Family ownership (1961–1970) ===
In 1960, John S. Marten was managing the Sexton Foods manufacturing plant in Indianapolis when he met Luker at an Indianapolis institutional foodservice trade show. Recognizing the commercial potential of Luker's breading process, Marten negotiated an agreement in early 1961 for the Marten family to purchase Fred's Frozen Foods, with the stipulation that Luker first file a patent on the breading process.

In November 1961, John S. Marten and his brother Harry Marten left Sexton Foods, having unsuccessfully advocated within that company for expansion into frozen foods. Other Sexton family members were skeptical that the traditional Sexton customer base would be interested in frozen products, given the significant capital investment required for restaurants to install freezers and for Sexton itself to convert its warehouses and delivery fleet. The Marten brothers believed that hotels, restaurants, and cafeterias could achieve meaningful labor savings by purchasing heat-and-serve frozen foods, despite the higher price relative to canned goods.

Under Marten family ownership, the business benefited from a significant policy shift: in 1962, the U.S. government mandated stricter nutritional standards for school lunches, creating substantial demand from the National School Lunch Program for portion-controlled meat items. To meet the resulting growth, the Martens expanded the Fred's product line to 40 items — including breaded frozen vegetables, frozen ethnic entrées, and frozen pre-portioned and breaded meats — opened a second manufacturing facility in Carthage, Missouri, extended distribution to 29 states, and grew annual sales to $6 million by 1970. The Marten family sold Fred's Frozen Foods to Central Soya in 1970 for an undisclosed amount.

=== Central Soya ownership (1970–1986) ===
Central Soya, a leading soybean miller and food processor headquartered in Fort Wayne, Indiana, acquired Fred's Frozen Foods from the Marten family in August 1970. The transaction was structured as a pooling of interests, in which Central Soya exchanged 150,000 shares of its stock for all Fred's assets, brands, equipment, personnel, and $7 million in outstanding debt, placing the total value of the acquisition at approximately $10 million. Central Soya broadened the Fred's product line to include frozen appetizers and additional ethnic entrées, and in 1971 opened a West Coast distribution warehouse and manufacturing plant in Riverside, California.

In 1982, Fred's Frozen Foods introduced what is believed to be the first mass-produced breaded mozzarella cheese stick for the foodservice industry.

In March 1985, Shamrock Holdings Inc. of Burbank, California — owned by the family of Roy E. Disney — acquired the remaining 90% of Central Soya it did not already own at approximately $23 per share. With 13.9 million shares outstanding, the transaction valued Central Soya at $320 million, excluding debt; the company had reported revenues of $1.73 billion for 1985. The offer was priced at the book value of Central Soya's outstanding stock. By July 1985, Shamrock announced plans to divest Central Soya's branded food businesses, including Fred's Frozen Foods, in order to concentrate on the company's agribusiness operations.

=== International Multifoods Corporation ownership (1986–1994) ===
On January 24, 1986, International Multifoods Corporation of Minneapolis, Minnesota announced that it had agreed to purchase Fred's Frozen Foods and Centre Brands from Central Soya for $73 million. Both newly acquired companies were folded into International Multifoods' prepared foods division.

=== Doskocil / Foodbrands America ownership (1994–1997) ===
In March 1994, The Doskocil Company, a producer of pizza toppings and other meat products, agreed to purchase International Multifoods' Frozen Specialty Foods Division for $135 million. The acquired brands included Fred's Frozen Foods, Rotanelli's, Posada, and Little Juan's, which were organized together under a new subsidiary, Doskocil Specialty Brands Co. In spring 1995, Doskocil changed its corporate name to Foodbrands America, Inc., to better reflect its identity as a broad-based processor and marketer of branded perishable and frozen foods.

=== IBP ownership (1997–2001) ===
Fred's for Starters logo, trademarked 1999

In 1997, Foodbrands America, Inc. was acquired by Iowa Beef Processors (IBP) for $640 million. In 1999, Foodbrands America — operating as Specialty Brands, LP, of Ontario, California — registered the Fred's for Starters trademark, reflecting a strategic repositioning of the brand as a leading foodservice provider of prepared appetizers, including breaded and battered vegetables, breaded cheese sticks, onion rings, steak nuggets, and seafood-based appetizers such as crab rangoon, pot stickers, and chicken shu mai. The rebranding marked a transition from contract manufacturing of unbranded products packaged to distributor specifications toward offering a recognized brand name within the foodservice market.

=== Tyson Foods and divestiture (2001–2002) ===
In September 2001, Tyson Foods acquired IBP for $3 billion. Tyson subsequently determined that Foodbrands America's Specialty Brands portfolio, including Fred's for Starters, did not align with its core corporate strategy and moved to divest the division.

=== Windsor Foods / HM International ownership (2002–present) ===
In April 2002, Tyson announced an agreement to sell Foodbrands America, Inc. — including Fred's for Starters — to Windsor Quality Food Company, Ltd. The sale included the Butcher Boy (meats), Jose Ole and Posada (Mexican foods), Rotanelli (frozen filled pastas), and Fred's Frozen Foods (frozen meatballs and snacks) brands. Industry analysts estimated the value of Specialty Brands Inc. at between $100 million and $200 million, with annual revenues estimated at $300 million for 2001. Stephens Inc., a Little Rock, Arkansas investment bank, represented Tyson in the transaction.

Windsor Quality Food Company, Ltd. is wholly owned by the Hojel and Meinig families of Tulsa, Oklahoma through their holding company HM International, LLC. Windsor Foods continues to operate the brand under the Fred's for Starters name.
