= US Foods =

American foodservice distributor

US Foods Holding Corp.
- Type: Public
- Traded as: NYSE: USFD; S&P 400 component
- Industry: Food industry
- Founded: August 1, 1989; 37 years ago
- Headquarters: Rosemont, Illinois, US
- Area served: Continental US
- Key people: David E. Flitman (CEO); Dirk J. Locascio (CFO)
- Products: Prepackaged meals and frozen foods, fresh produce
- Services: Foodservice distributor
- Revenue: ▲US$39.4 billion (2025)
- Net income: ▲US$676 million (2025)
- Number of employees: 30,000 (2024)
- Website: www.usfoods.com

US Foods Holding Corp. (formerly known as U.S. Foodservice) is an American food service distributor. It is the second-largest food service distributor in the US, after Sysco. The company supplies 250,000 locations including independent restaurants, chain restaurants, healthcare, hospitality, and educational institutions.

In 2024, 34% of revenues came from meats and seafoods, 17% of revenues came from dry grocery products, 17% of revenue came from refrigerated and frozen grocery products, 11% of revenues came from dairy, 9% of revenues came from supplies, 6% of revenues came from produce, and 6% of revenues came from beverages.

The company is ranked 122nd on the Fortune 500 and 1127th on the Forbes Global 2000.

== History ==
=== Early history ===
The company traces its roots to John Sexton & Company, founded in 1883. It was one of the first food distributors to develop a national sales force and distribution network, first with a horse and wagon, and after 1924, with a diesel truck fleet. In 1968, John Sexton & Co. was purchased by Beatrice Foods for $37.5 million.

In the 1970s, the Pearce-Young-Angel Company (PYA) merged with Monarch Foods, then owned by Consolidated Foods Corporation (the precursor of Sara Lee). In 1983, S.E. Rykoff merged with Sexton to become Rykoff-Sexton. In the late 1980s, Sara Lee completed the corporate spin-off of its northeastern and mid-Atlantic portions of the company to management in a leveraged buyout, forming JP Foodservice. In 1996, JP Foodservice acquired the remaining portion of PYA/Monarch.

In 1992, United Signature Foods Inc. was created. United Signature Foods Inc. After a series of mergers and buyouts between Rykoff-Sexton and US Foodservice and finally JP Foodservice, the company became a nationwide distributor.

=== 1990s ===
In November 1994, the company adopted the name JP Foodservice, Inc. and became a public company via an initial public offering. Sara Lee Corporation then held 37% of JP common stock. The public offering raised $80 million, and JP restructured and paid off much of its debt.

Toward the end of 1995, the company and its former parent, Sara Lee Corporation, began talks about exchanging PYA/Monarch, Sara Lee's southeastern foodservice subsidiary, for JP stock worth about $946 million. Yet, the two companies failed to reach agreement on several factors, including valuation (JP's stock price had gone up in expectation of the merger), structure, and dilution of earnings to existing shareholders, and the deal fell through in February 1996. The experience left both sides bitter, and JP was expected to find a way to reduce Sara Lee's presence or end its investment in the company all together. In late 1996, Sara Lee sold its remaining stake in JP Foodservice.

In February 2000, U.S. Foodservice acquired Stock Yards Packing. In April 2000, Ahold acquired US Foodservice for $3.6 billion. In December 2000, U.S. Foodservice acquired PYA/Monarch for $1.57 billion.

In 2007, Clayton, Dubilier & Rice and Kohlberg Kravis Roberts acquired the company for $7.1 billion.

=== 2010s— ===
In August 2010, John A. Lederer was appointed president and chief executive officer.

In September 2011, U.S. Foodservice announced its name change to US Foods, Inc. (styled as "US. Foods" in the new logo unveiled at the same time).

In December 2013, Sysco agreed to acquire US Foods for $8.2 billion but the merger was terminated in 2015 after failure to get regulatory approval due to antitrust concerns.

In May 2016, after the merger with Sysco was terminated, the company once again became a public company via an initial public offering.

In November 2022, Dave Flitman was named chief executive officer of the company.

=== Acquisitions ===
#	Year	Company	Description	Ref(s).
1	October 2010	Nino's Wholesale	Italian foods distributor to pizzerias, fine Italian restaurants, and gourmet shops in South Florida	
2	February 2011	Midway Produce	Produce distributor in central Indiana	
3	April 2011	WVO Industries	Waste vegetable oil processor	
4	April 2011	Ritter Food Service	Specialty distributor of poultry, meats and seafood	
5	May 2011	Great Western Meats	Foodservice distributor and provider of fresh-cut portion meats in Central Florida	
6	June 2011	White Apron's Distribution Business	Supplier and processor of premium fresh meats based in Brea, Calif	
7	July 2011	Vesuvio Foods	Italian foods for pizzerias, fine Italian restaurants and gourmet shops in metro New York	
8	June 2012	New City Packing	Supplier of steaks and fresh-cut portion meats to restaurants	
9	October 2013	Quandt's Foodservice	Foodservice distributor in Eastern New York and portions of Western New England	
10	December 2015	Dierks Waukesha	Regional distributor in Wisconsin	
11	February 2016	Carra Donna	Wholesale distributor serving New England	
12	May 2016	Freshway Foods	Produce supplier; sold in 2025	
13	October 2016	Jeraci Foods	Distributor of specialty Italian foods based in Elmsford, New York	
14	October 2016	Save On Seafood	Processor and distributor in St. Petersburg, Florida	
15	February 2017	All American Foods	Distributor in Rhode Island, Massachusetts and Connecticut	
16	April 2017	FirstClass Foods	Meat manufacturing company based in Hawthorne, California	
17	June 2017	F. Christiana	Distributor in Louisiana, Southern Mississippi and Southern Alabama	
18	July 2017	TOBA Inc. distribution companies	Distributor in seven states in the Midwestern United States	
19	January 2018	SRA Foods	Meat processor and distributor in Birmingham, Alabama	
20	September 2019	SGA Food Group	Price was $1.8 billion	
21	March 2020	Smart Foodservice Warehouse Stores (now US Foods Chef'Store)	Price was $970 million	
22	May 2023	Renzi Foodservice	Distributor in central upstate New York	
23	November 2023	Saladino's Foodservice	Broadline distributor in California	
24	February 2024	IWC Food Service	Broadline distributor based in Cookeville, Tennessee	
