= Bell Brand Snack Foods =

American snack food company

Bell Brand Foods, Inc.
- Type: Snack food
- Founded: 1925
- Defunct: 1995
- Headquarters: Santa Fe Springs, California, United States
- Parent: General Foods

Bell Brand Foods, Inc. was founded by Cyril C. Nigg in 1925, the company was a Southern California-based manufacturer of a regionally popular line of snack products including potato chips, tortilla chips, corn chips, cheese curls and pretzels. The company's headquarters were located in Santa Fe Springs, California. General Foods Corporation put Bell Brand up for sale in 1995 due to the company's financial issues. However, Bell Brand went out of business on July 7, 1995 after General Foods could not find a buyer for the company.

Bell Brand potato chips were advertised on television by Southern California station affiliates, with the tag line at the end of every commercial: "If it's Bell, it's swell!"
