= Food service distributor =

A food service distributor is a company that provides food and non-food products to restaurants, cafeterias, industrial caterers, hospitals, schools/colleges/universities, nursing homes, and anywhere food is served away from the home.

== Description ==
A food service distributor functions as an intermediary between food manufacturers and the food service operator (usually a chef, food service director, food and beverage manager, and independent food preparation businesses operator owners.) The distributor purchases, stores, sells, and delivers those products, providing food service operators with access to items from a wide variety of manufacturers. Food service distributors procure pallets and bulk inventory quantities that are broken down to case and sometimes unit quantities for the food service operator. Most food service operators purchase from a range of local, specialty, and broadline food service distributors on a daily or weekly basis.

== Manufacturers ==
Often a food manufacturer may hire a food brokerage company to represent the manufacturer in a local market. The broker helps the food manufacturer market its products through the food service distribution system, which ranges from getting items stocked at the distributor to working with operators to purchase items from the distributor. At the same time, distributor sales teams work to market products directly to operator customers.

== Broadline ==
A broadline distributor services a wide variety of accounts with a wide variety of products, while a system distributor stocks a narrow array of products for specific customers, such as restaurant chains. A broadline distributor may carry up to 15,000 different items for purchase and operate sophisticated warehouse and transportation operations.

== Jobbers ==
A small food service distributor is often referred to as a "wagon-jobber". These wagon-jobbers will purchase food in bulk and deliver small quantities to independent retail stores keeping their shelves stocked. Independent distributors and jobbers service independent convenience store markets, bodegas and niche grocery stores. While these distributors are unorganized, networks of independent distributors and wagon jobbers have emerged to give these jobbers the ability to identify trends in the market.

== Statistics ==
It is estimated by food industry research firm Technomic that approximately 225 million meals are eaten away from home each day in the U.S. This includes both restaurant and non-commercial eating places. The International Foodservice Distributors Association estimates that food service distributors in the U.S., as a daily average, deliver approximately 27 million cases of food and other products.

Food service distribution companies can range in size from a one-truck operation to larger corporations. There are many independent broadline food service distribution companies that service chain and multi-unit restaurants based on master distribution agreements with national food service groups. These groups provide distributor members procurement capabilities that rival the purchasing power of the largest distributors. These distributor groups also provide distributor members group private label brands as well as marketing and quality assurance services.

In the US, the industry is highly fragmented, with Sysco capturing 17% of the market, US Foods with about 9%, PFG with 5%, Gordon Food Service and Gold Star Foods playing a large part as well. The rest are spread across a host of smaller, regional players.

== Redistribution ==
In the food redistribution model, a redistributor will purchase in truckload quantities from many food manufacturers and warehouse these products for its customers. Individual distributors (typically smaller in size and service area) can then purchase items across multiple manufacturers' on one easy to place order from the redistributor.

The redistribution model affords smaller distributors who are unable to purchase direct truckloads an opportunity to purchase from a non-competitor in less than truckload (LTL) quantities, giving them the ability to compete against larger distributors in their territory. Typically, it is the smaller distributor that services the independent non-chain retail outlets often overlooked by the larger distributors.

== See also ==
- Foodservice
