= Denbies =

Estate in Surrey, England

Coordinates: 51.24156°N 0.35537°W

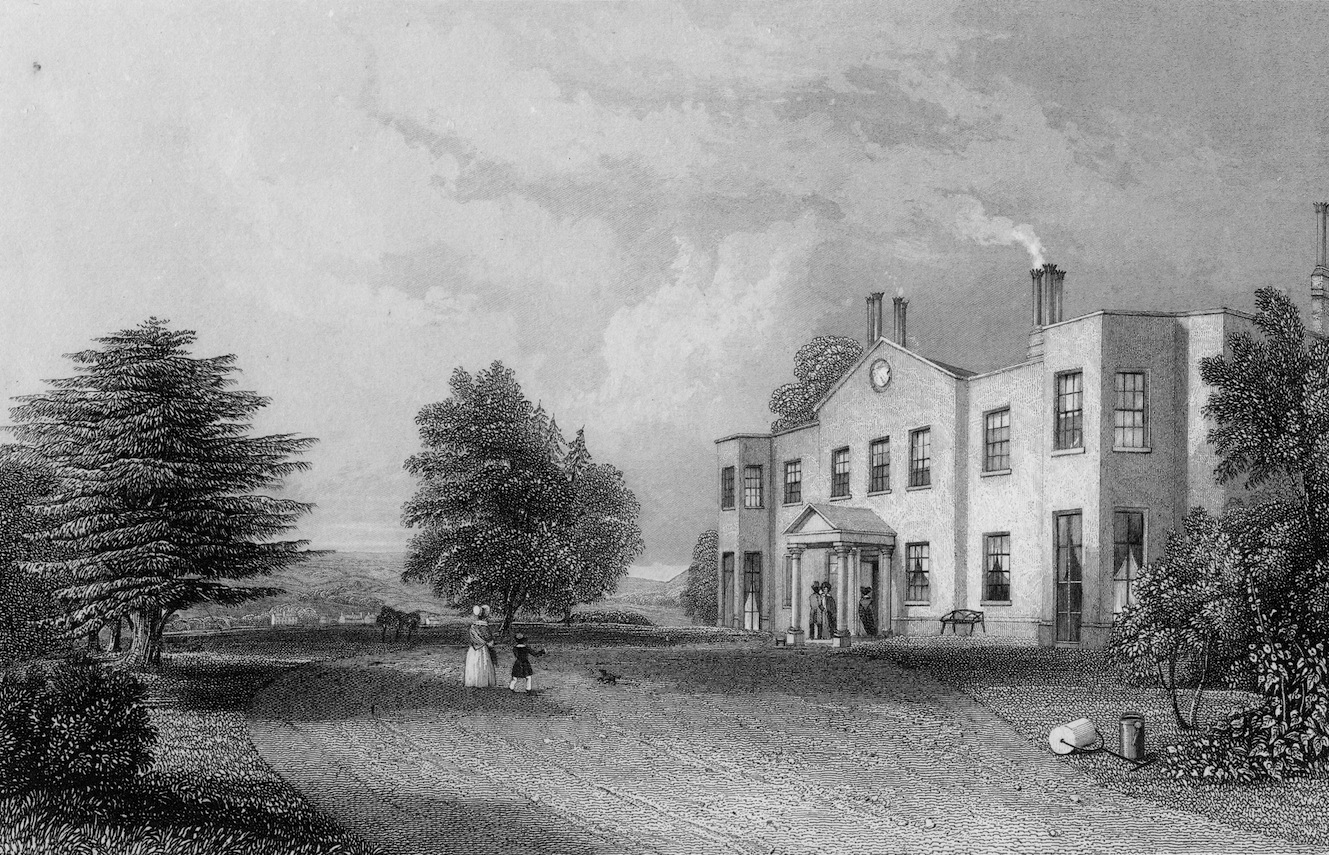
The mansion on the estate in about 1840, when it was owned by the Denison family

Denbies is a large estate to the northwest of Dorking in Surrey, England. A farmhouse and surrounding land originally owned by John Denby was purchased in 1734 by Jonathan Tyers, the proprietor of Vauxhall Gardens in London, and converted into a weekend retreat. The house he built appears to have been of little architectural significance, but the Gothic garden he developed in the grounds on the theme of death achieved some notoriety, despite being short-lived. The estate was bought by Lord King of Ockham following Tyers's death in 1767, and the macabre artefacts he had installed, including two stone coffins topped by human skulls, were removed.

Joseph Denison, a wealthy banker, purchased the estate in about 1787, and it remained in the Denison family until 1849, when it passed to Thomas Cubitt, a master builder. At the time, Cubitt was working on Osborne House for Queen Victoria and Prince Albert, and the mansion he designed to replace the old one was a more modest version of Osborne. It was, however, still a substantial building, in the Italianate style, with almost 100 rooms on three storeys. In the nineteenth century Denison and later Cubitt served as local Members of Parliament, for West Surrey.

The payment of death duties and the difficulty of maintaining a large domestic estate during the Second World War forced the family to begin selling parcels of land. Cubitt's mansion was abandoned until its demolition in 1953, by which time the family was living in a Regency-style house converted from the housing of the garden and stable staff in more affluent times.

What remained of the estate – about 635 acres (2.57 km^{2}) – was put on the market in 1984 and bought by Biwater, a water-treatment company. Two years later the company chairman Adrian White established Denbies Wine Estate, using 268 acres (1.08 km^{2}) on a south-facing piece of land to plant vines.

== History ==
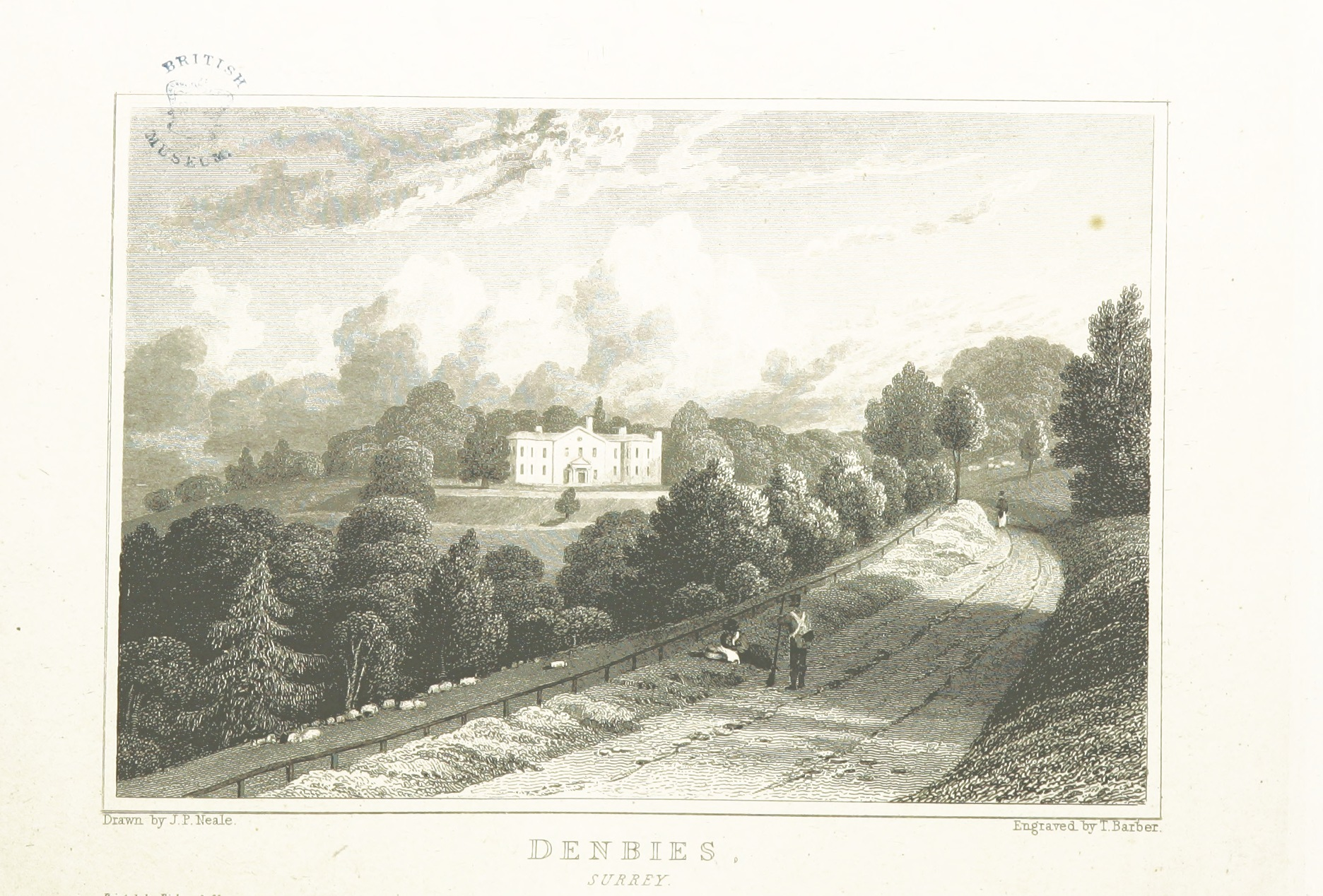
Denbies in 1826 by John Preston Neale

A farmhouse originally owned by John Denby in the mid-16th century, after whom the estate is named, stood at the heart of Denbies. (Note: John Denby is listed as a farmer in a manorial court paper from 1555.) The lands were sold by William Wakefield (or Wakeford) to Jonathan Tyers in 1734, (Note: Most references quote 1734; the Victoria History of the County of Surrey (published in 1911), however, gives 1754 as the year of purchase.) to be developed as a weekend retreat. Tyers was the owner of London's Vauxhall Gardens – known at that time as New Spring Gardens – and was responsible for developing that venue into a "fashionable place of evening entertainment". A simple two-storey house in the Georgian style was built by converting some of the old farm buildings. Set on top of a hillside about two miles (3.2 km) northwest of Dorking, the house had views of the Surrey landscape and backed onto Ranmore Common. Tyers installed a well beside the house; a note in The Gentleman's Magazine of 1781 gives the well's measurements, recorded on 4 October 1764, as being six feet (1.8 m) in diameter and reaching a depth of four hundred and thirty-eight feet (134 m). On that day it contained water to a depth of twenty-two feet (6.7 m) supplied from a spring. The front of the house had a pediment in the central wing decorated with a coat of arms; the rooms were not large but were conveniently situated. According to historian Brian Allen the house was not architecturally significant and scant information is available about it; the garden established by Tyers, however, gained notoriety.

== The Valley of the Shadow of Death ==
In contrast to the cheerful, brightly lit atmosphere of Vauxhall, the garden Tyers developed at Denbies was of a more Gothic nature. Its theme was "memento mori (or 'reminders of death')", and the development was given the name of "The Valley of the Shadow of Death". Tyers continued to live in his house in the grounds of Vauxhall after purchasing Denbies, visiting the latter only on Sundays, which, it has been suggested, may go some way towards explaining the garden's gloomy nature. David Coke and Alan Borg, authors of Vauxhall Gardens: A History (2012), have alternatively suggested that the mood of the garden may have been symptomatic of "some sort of psychological imbalance" within Tyers, perhaps even "a form of bipolar disorder". The garden's main feature was a wooded area of about eight acres (3.2 ha), Il Penseroso, (Note: Tyers was an admirer of the poet John Milton, and named his wood after Milton's melancholy poem of the same name.) which was criss-crossed by a labyrinthine network of paths leading down to a small tributary of the River Mole.

Engraving of Francis Hayman's painting Death of a Christian

Engraving of Hayman's matching painting, Death of an Unbeliever

Just outside the entrance to the wood was a small hermitage known as The Temple of Death. It had a thatched roof and internal enclosures formed by fake stonework panels, each covered in verses reminding the reader of "the vanity, the shortness and insufficiency of human pleasures". To the right-hand side of the temple entrance, hidden out of sight, was a clock that chimed every minute, which in the words of William Bowyer, was "admonishing us that Time is fleeting, and even the least portion of it to be employed in reflections on Eternity"; it was faced on the opposite side by a large white raven with a label in its mouth conveying the same message. Chained to a sloping desk in the centre of the temple was a copy of Edward Young's poem Night-Thoughts and Robert Blair's The Grave, bound in black leather.

At the end of the temple farthest from the door was a substantial monument to Robert Petre, a renowned 18th-century horticulturist. Executed in stucco and probably crafted by Louis-François Roubiliac, it depicted an angel blowing the last trump, causing a stone pyramid to crumble and revealing the corpse within to be rising from the dead.

Visitors were met at the entrance to the wood by the Latin inscription Procul este, profani, which translates as "away all you who are unhallowed", a quotation from the sixth book of Virgil's Aeneid. The iron entrance gate was mounted between two upended stone coffins supporting the portico, each one topped by a human skull, one male one female. Each coffin was inscribed with a poem, addressed to the male and female visitor respectively. One proclaimed that "Men, at their best state, are altogether vanity", while the other reminded women that "beauty is vain". The author of the poems is unknown, but may have been Soame Jenyns, although the topographer Edward Brayley was not entirely convinced this was correct.

A large alcove close by in the garden, entered through a portal of grey Sussex marble, formed an amphitheatre that contained an effigy representing Truth crushing a mask, again probably the work of Roubiliac. It drew the visitor's attention towards two life-sized pictures by Francis Hayman, depicting a Christian and an Unbeliever as they died, set into compartments in the wall.

Following Tyers's death in 1767 the estate was sold to Thomas King, 5th Baron King (1712–1779) of Ockham in Surrey. The macabre artefacts were removed and the grounds extensively altered.

== Subsequent history ==
=== Whyte ===
Soon after the death in 1779 of the 5th Baron King, (Note: According to Prosser the 1767 purchaser was Peter (sic) King and the estate was sold sometime after his death by his son at the end of 1781, but Neale does not indicate which Lord King it was; Debrett's Peerage gives Peter King, 6th Baron King (1736–1793) and states his father was Thomas King, 5th Baron King (1712–1779).) in 1781 his son Peter King, 6th Baron King (1736–1793) sold the estate to James I Whyte (c. 1747–1807) of Ireland, son of Mark Whyte by his wife Elizabeth Edwards, a daughter of John Edwards of Old Court, County Wicklow, Ireland. James I Whyte was described by Oliver (1829) as "Colonel Jas Whyte of Ireland". In 1772 at St George's, Hanover Square, Mayfair, James I Whyte married (as his first wife) Gertrude Gee, a daughter of James Gee of Bishop Burton Hall near Beverley in the East Riding of Yorkshire. The witnesses at his marriage were Richard D'Arcy Hildyard and Richard Whyte. His son and heir by his first marriage was James II Whyte (1774–1852) of Pilton House near Barnstaple in Devon, who in 1805 at St George's, Hanover Square, married Frances Honoria Beresford, a daughter of the Irish statesman Hon. John Beresford (1738–1805), a younger son of Marcus Beresford, 1st Earl of Tyrone (1694–1763) and a younger brother of George de La Poer Beresford, 1st Marquess of Waterford (1735–1800). James I Whyte married secondly Anne-Catherine Hildyard, the sister and heiress of Sir Robert Hildyard, 4th Baronet (1743–1814) of Winestead Hall, near Pattrington, East Riding of Yorkshire, by whom he had a daughter Anne Catherine Whyte, heiress of the Hildyard estates, who married Colonel Thomas Blackborne Thoroton, Coldstream Guards, of Flintham Hall, Flintham, Nottinghamshire, who adopted the surname Hildyard as a condition of his wife's inheritance. Denbies remained in the ownership of James I Whyte for six years until around 1787, when it was purchased by Joseph Denison, a wealthy banker.

=== Denison family ownership ===
Denison was brought up in West Yorkshire. His parents were of low rank and had little means, and it is unclear how he made his fortune. It seems that he moved to London, where he fell in with the Heywood family of bankers, later becoming a partner in their company. Richard Vickerman Taylor described the immense wealth Denison accumulated as being gained through "unabated industry and the most rigid frugality". Five years after purchasing Denbies, the Seamere estate, near Scarborough, Yorkshire, was added to his portfolio after he acquired it from the Duke of Leeds. Denison had a son, William Joseph, and two daughters, Elizabeth and Anna Maria, with his second wife. By the time of the Regency era the family were the personification of prosperity and social status. Denison senior died in 1806 and the estate and all other properties were inherited by his son, who added to the acreage of the estate by purchasing additional land from the Earl of Verulam and the Duke of Norfolk. A new driveway was installed, entering from the direction of Mickleham via some woodland, replacing the steep roadway that came from Dorking. Writing in 1830, topographer Thomas Allen described the expansive well-designed gardens as being under the direction of a "scientific and experienced horticulturist". The lawns at the front of the mansion featured sprinklings of evergreens and shrubs together with formal low-level flower beds. Local people were permitted access to the estate grounds.

Like his father, Denison junior was a banker and became a senior partner in his father's banking company, Denison, Heywood, and Kennard, of Lombard Street, London. He continued to add to the wealth inherited from his father, and when he died a bachelor on 2 August 1849 he was probably one of the ten richest British businessmen of his era. He left his fortune, estimated at £2.3 million, to his nephew Albert, on condition that he changed his surname from Conyngham to Denison. Albert was elevated to Baron Londesborough on 4 March 1850, and later that year he sold the 3,900-acre (16 km^{2}) estate at Denbies to the master builder, Thomas Cubitt.

=== Cubitt family ownership ===
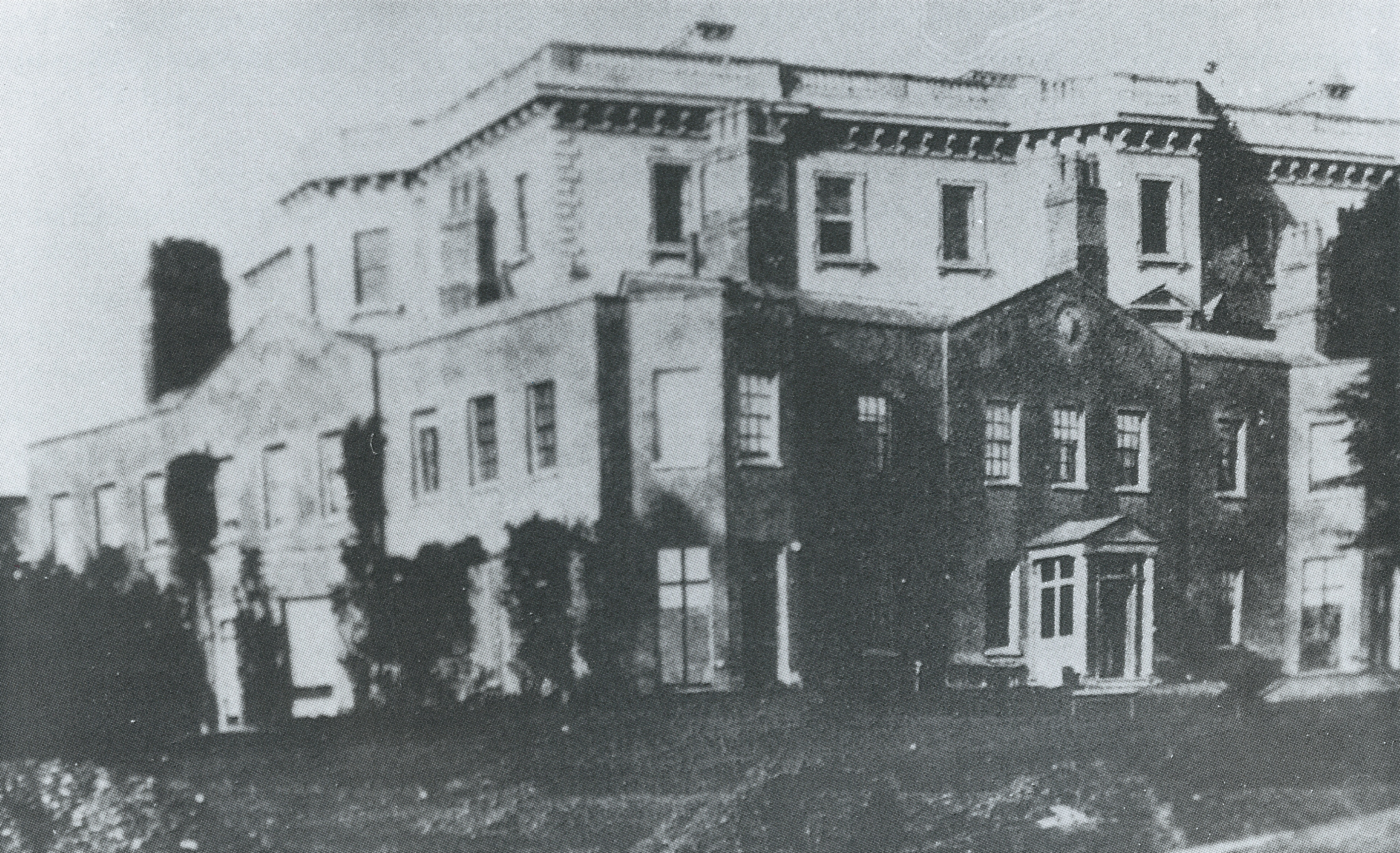
Cubitt's new mansion, nearing completion behind Tyers's smaller mansion

Cubitt was originally a carpenter and, like Denison senior, had acquired his wealth through his own business acumen, building up a successful company and business empire. At the time he purchased Denbies, Cubitt was nearing completion of the work on Osborne House for Queen Victoria and Prince Albert on the Isle of Wight. Cubitt wanted a mansion of his own to emulate that of the neighbouring Georgian country house of Deepdene owned by the affluent Hope family of bankers and at that time in the possession of Henry Thomas Hope, a patron of the arts. For the practical purpose of continuing to reside in the existing house while building took place, the new mansion was constructed on a site slightly to the southwest of its predecessor, which was demolished once the new mansion was completed in 1854.

==== Cubitt's new mansion ====
Constructed to Cubitt's own designs, the new mansion had a very similar style to that of Osborne House. Cubitt's attention to detail was such that he even manufactured his own bricks at a brickworks he set up for the purpose, using lime extracted from the chalk quarries on the eastern edge of the estate. Almost one hundred rooms made up the Italianate structure's three storeys, stretching across nine bays in a square formation. Cubitt contrived his own form of soundproofing by concealing seashells between levels. The flat roof was edged with a parapet embellished with balustrades, and a matching decoration was incorporated round the first floor, both made from Portland stone. Gibbs surrounds were used on the windows on the ground floor whereas triangular pediments featured on the windows included on the three central canted bays of the first floor. Segmented pediments adorned all the remaining windows. The water supply was provided by the well installed by Tyers, which was close to the southeast corner of the new mansion, via a corridor that spanned the entire outside of the mansion. The entrance had an attached porte-cochère enabling visitors to gain undercover access to the outer hall directly from their transport.

==== Interior ====
Internally, the ground floor of the west wing housed the dining room, service areas and led through to the kitchen and bakehouse. The service area was fitted with a mezzanine floor to provide sleeping facilities for male servants; the sleeping quarters for female servants were on the top floor of the mansion to keep the two sexes a good distance away from each other. On the same level, the east wing had a study with ante-room set in the northwest corner, a boudoir, two drawing rooms and a billiard room. An expansive library, divided into sections by pillars, was between the boudoir and study, beside the large bay window. The first floor, accessed via the main staircase positioned within the entrance hall, had all the family bedrooms, and featured balconies. Hip baths were carried to the bedrooms each evening as no bathrooms were incorporated. Cubitt had furniture workshops in London where the majority of the mansion's furnishings and fittings were crafted from mahogany. Nurseries were on the top floor beside the female servant accommodation. Around thirty rooms made up the basement, among them a smoking room where editions of Punch and The Illustrated London News were supplied as reading material. The remaining rooms on the basement level were workshops, wine cellars and individual parlours for the butler, housekeeper and other principal servants, together with general storerooms.

==== Grounds ====
Adjoining the mansion, accessed through a conservatory so there was no need to go outside in inclement weather, an expansive collection of glasshouses and conservatories stretched for 1,230 feet (370 m). These were maintained by thirteen staff under the jurisdiction of a head gardener. The kitchen garden occupied about two acres (0.81 ha).

Prince Albert visited the estate in July 1851, and planted two trees in front of the terrace to commemorate his visit. (Note: One of the trees survived until 25 January 1990, when it was blown over during the Burns' Day storm.) There was speculation that the mansion was to be used as a residence for Prince Albert's eldest son and newspapers carried reports that the commemorative trees were possibly "intended to grow up side by side with England's future monarch"; Cubitt strongly denied the suggestion, and on 14 April 1855 he had a rejection of the rumour included in The Builder. The grounds had been well maintained by the Denisons, but Cubitt further enhanced and overhauled them; large plantations of hardwoods and conifers were added, and general improvements and development of the estate and farm were undertaken. Specimens of rare plants and shrubs were added, sourced through William Hooker, the director of Kew Gardens, who was a friend of Cubitt's. William Nesfield was commissioned to design the gardens.

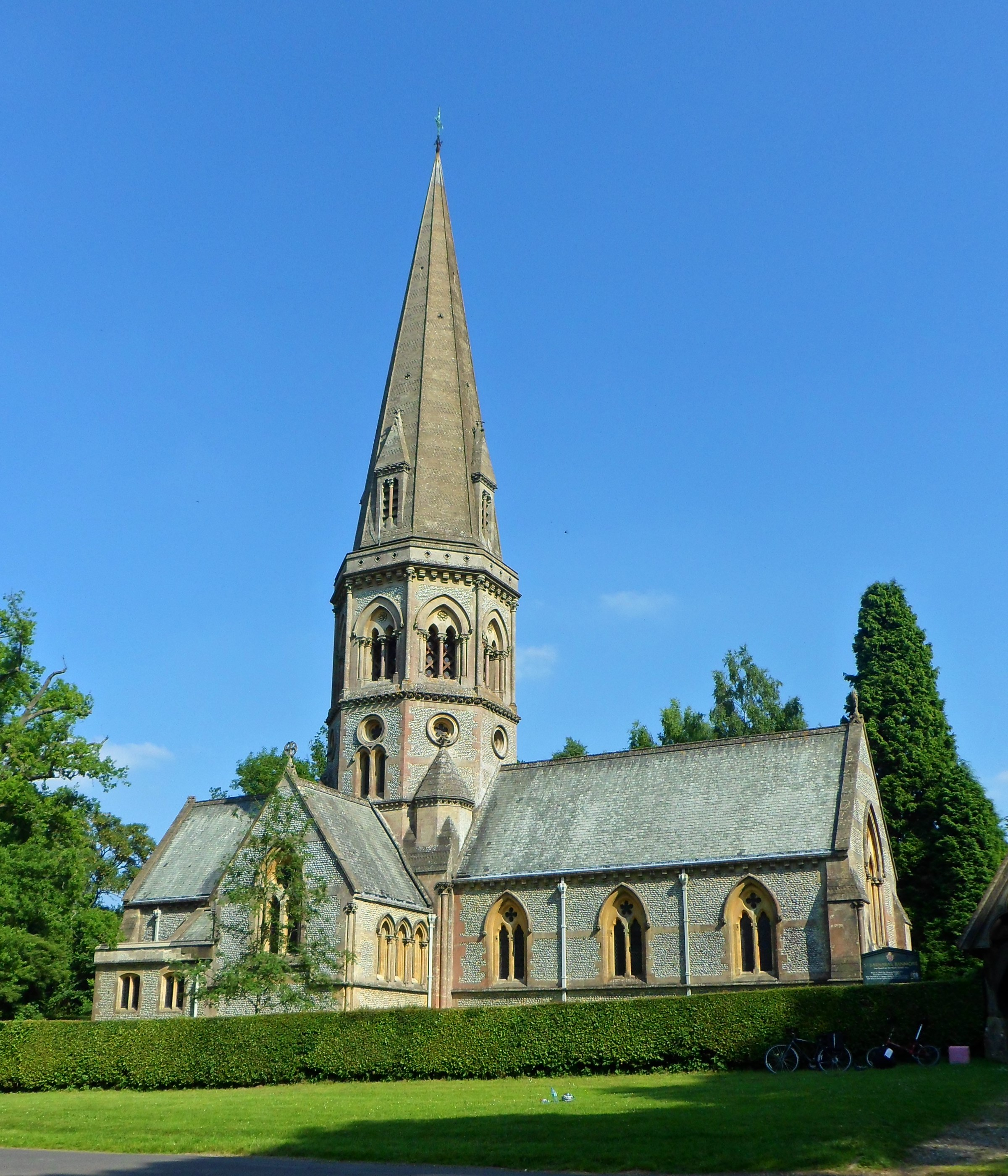
Completed in 1859, St Barnabas' Church was constructed during a period of expansion and development of the estate.

Access routes to the estate were also added to and enhanced; there were three driveways giving approaches from the North Downs, Dorking and from the railway at the west. Cubitt was responsible for building a siding on the north side of Dorking Town railway station, which was initially used for trains delivering building materials required for the mansion's construction.

==== Cubitt's death and legacy ====
Following Cubitt's death at Denbies on 20 December 1855, his assets were valued at more than £1 million. The estate passed to Cubitt's eldest son, George, who continued the development and expansion of the property and local area. George had lived at Denbies since his father purchased it, and it remained his main residence until 1905 after the death of his wife, Laura, whom he had married in June 1853. He was a politician, first elected as a member of parliament in 1860, and was elevated to a peerage in 1892, becoming the first Lord Ashcombe. The couple had eight children, three sons and five daughters; two of the boys died as babies, only the youngest son, Henry, survived to inherit the estate after his father's death.

During a period of expansion and prosperity under the ownership of Ashcombe a further 2,000 acres (8.1 km^{2}) of land were secured, and gradually other acquisitions were made; the estate then stretched as far as Birtley Court, near Bramley and Churt. As a landlord and employer – by that time he had about 400 workers on the estate – he was a benevolent master and ensured he fulfilled his obligations. He commissioned Sir George Gilbert Scott, a friend and regular guest at Denbies, to design an estate church on Ranmore Common. Completed in 1859, it was named after St Barnabas. (Note: The church was designated a Grade II* listed building in November 1966; the first Lord Ashcombe is buried near the chancel and the second Lord Ashcombe had a war memorial constructed there in 1920 to commemorate his three sons killed during the war.) Ashcombe also ensured that the basic medical needs of his workers were attended to, by having a cottage built to serve as a dispensary and a place for physicians from the nearby towns to hold twice-weekly surgeries. The cottage was also the venue for a domestic training school where the daughters of his workers received a year of education in the rudiments of domestic service before either being employed in his household or those of other country houses.

== Decline and dispersal ==
Lord Ashcombe's son, Henry, married Maud, whose father was Colonel Archibald Motteaux Calvert, in 1890. The couple lived on the estate near Bramley and had six sons. Their three eldest sons were killed in the First World War while on active service. Like his father, Henry followed a political career, becoming Lord Lieutenant of Surrey in 1905; that year Henry moved to the mansion house after his father decamped to London following the death of Henry's mother. He inherited the title and extensive estate after the death of his father in 1917. The payment of death duties and the upkeep of large estates during the war resulted in large parts of the estate being auctioned on 19 September 1921. A total of £30,400 was raised by the sale of sixty-nine lots – tallying around 232 acres (0.94 km^{2}) – of land and property on the periphery of the estate just south of the railway line. Further land situated closer to Dorking town centre was sold for development in the 1930s. The break up of the estate continued after Henry's death on 27 October 1947 when it was inherited by his fourth son Roland, who became the third Lord Ashcombe.

Roland was born on 26 January 1899 and initially followed a career in the army. He married Sonia Rosemary Keppel on 16 November 1920 and they had three children: two sons, Henry and Jeremy (1927–1958); and a daughter, Rosalind. (Note: The couple divorced in 1947; Roland remarried twice, his second wife died in 1954 and he married again in 1959. There were no children from his later marriages.) Death duties and the Second World War impacted greatly on the estate: staffing was a problem, and maintenance and general repair costs were unsustainable. The Home Guard requisitioned a section of the mansion as its headquarters and based a training school there. Hugh Pollock, husband of the author Enid Blyton, re-ignited his adulterous affair with Ida Crowe after arranging work there for her as a civilian secretary. Roland transformed the buildings that had previously been used as housing for the garden and stable staff into a Regency-style house. Flooring and doors were stripped from the old mansion to be incorporated in the new house, leaving just the basic structure of Cubitt's original mansion, which had been empty since 1947. Furniture was disposed of in a clearance sale at Dorking in mid-July 1952. Cubitt's mansion was within a designated preservation area, causing the local council to refuse any suggestions that were put forward for the old mansion to be used for commercial purposes. Contractors were brought in to demolish the mansion in 1953; the company may have encountered financial problems, as the basement was not fully destroyed and was left filled with rubble from the higher levels. (Note: In 1988 the layout of the servants' rooms in the basement was revealed after the rubble was removed.)

=== Transfer to National Trust and sale ===
Death duties were still outstanding, but in 1959 the Treasury accepted about 1,128 acres (4.56 km^{2}) of land in lieu of payment, which it passed on to the National Trust. At the end of 1963 an additional 245 acres (0.99 km^{2}) from Denbies hillside was secured by the Trust via the same route. The Trust also received 800 acres (3.2 km^{2}) directly from Lord Ashcombe in 1958 after the mansion was demolished. There had been thirty cottages on the estate in its heyday, but a policy of selling them began with a cottage given to the Trust in 1959. Roland died on 28 October 1962 and the break up and sale of the estate continued under his son Henry, who succeeded him; by this time what remained of the estate amounted to the Regency-style house with land at the eastern end of Ranmore Common, a handful of estate cottages, an adjoining farm – known as Bradley Farm – and some estate outbuildings.

Henry's third marriage was to Elizabeth, the widow of his friend Mark Dent-Brocklehurst, in 1979; (Note: First married in 1955, Henry's first wife was the divorcee Ghislaine Alexander. After their divorce in 1968 he married Virginia, daughter of Lord Carrington in 1973, which marriage was also dissolved.) she had inherited Sudeley Castle, and the couple made it their family home. Five years later the last of the Denbies estate was offered for sale, bringing to an end more than a century of ownership by the Cubitt family.

== Recent times ==
When what remained of the estate was marketed in May 1984 the selling agents, Savills, described it as being about 635 acres (2.57 km^{2}). This figure included 312 acres (126 ha) attached to Bradley Farm together with the farmhouse, four cottages and some farm buildings. Denbies House – as the Regency-style house conversion was named – had a lodge, a flat and two cottages, 45 acres (0.18 km^{2}) of parkland, arable land covering 32 acres (0.13 km^{2}) and 239 acres (0.97 km^{2}) devoted to sporting and amenity woodland. The centrally heated, eight-bedroomed mansion house featured six bathrooms and four reception rooms. There were also tennis courts, stables, garages and a heated swimming pool together with poolhouse. Biwater, a water-treatment company, purchased it during the 1980s. In 1986 the company chairman Adrian White established Denbies Wine Estate, planting vines on 268 acres (1.08 km^{2}) of south-facing land.
