= Roland Cubitt, 3rd Baron Ashcombe =

British peer (1899–1962)

The Right Honourable The Lord Ashcombe DL
- Born: Roland Calvert Cubitt; 26 January 1899; London, England
- Died: 28 October 1962 (aged 63); Surrey, England
- Spouses: Sonia Rosemary Keppel (m. 1920; div. 1947) Idina Joan Mills (m. 1948; died 1954) Jean Baylis (m. 1959)
- Issue: Rosalind Shand; Henry Cubitt, 4th Baron Ashcombe; Jeremy Cubitt
- Parents: Henry Cubitt, 2nd Baron Ashcombe; Maud Calvert

Roland Calvert Cubitt, 3rd Baron Ashcombe, DL (26 January 1899 – 28 October 1962) was a member of the British aristocracy. He became Baron Ashcombe on the death of his father Henry Cubitt, 2nd Baron Ashcombe, in 1947. He was the maternal grandfather of Queen Camilla.

== Education and career ==
Cubitt was educated at Eton and the Royal Military College, Sandhurst. He was a Lieutenant in the Coldstream Guards, and was appointed to be a Deputy Lieutenant in 1939 and held office as Vice-Lord Lieutenant of Surrey in 1940.

== Family ==
On 16 November 1920 he married Sonia Rosemary Keppel, daughter of the Hon. George Keppel and his wife Alice Keppel, at the Guards Chapel, Wellington Barracks, in London. They were divorced in 1947 after having three children:

- Rosalind Maud Cubitt (1921–1994) - m. Major Bruce Middleton Hope Shand and had three children:
  - Camilla Rosemary Shand (b. 17 July 1947), later Queen Camilla of the United Kingdom
  - Sonia Annabel Shand (b. 2 February 1949)
  - Mark Roland Shand (28 June 1951 – 23 April 2014)
- Henry Edward Cubitt (1924–2013) (who succeeded as the 4th Baron Ashcombe on the death of his father) m. Ghislaine Alexander (née Dresselhuys, ex-wife of Denis Alexander, 6th Earl of Caledon later The Baroness Foley)

m. Virginia Carington (daughter of Peter Carington, 6th Baron Carrington)
m. Mary Elizabeth Dent-Brocklehurst (née Chipps) (widow of late Mark Dent-Brocklehurst)

- Jeremy John Cubitt (1927–1958) m. Diana Edith Du Cane and had a child:
  - Sarah Victoria Cubitt (b. 1953)

Roland married secondly, on 6 August 1948, Idina Joan Mills who died in 1954 (former wife of Lieut. John Charles Trueman Mills), daughter of Col. Robert Edward Myddelton, and his wife Lady Violet Wellesley.

He married thirdly, on 2 July 1959, Jean Baylis (former wife of Greville Pollard Baylis), daughter of Charles Tuller Garland (d.1973).

== Death and burial ==
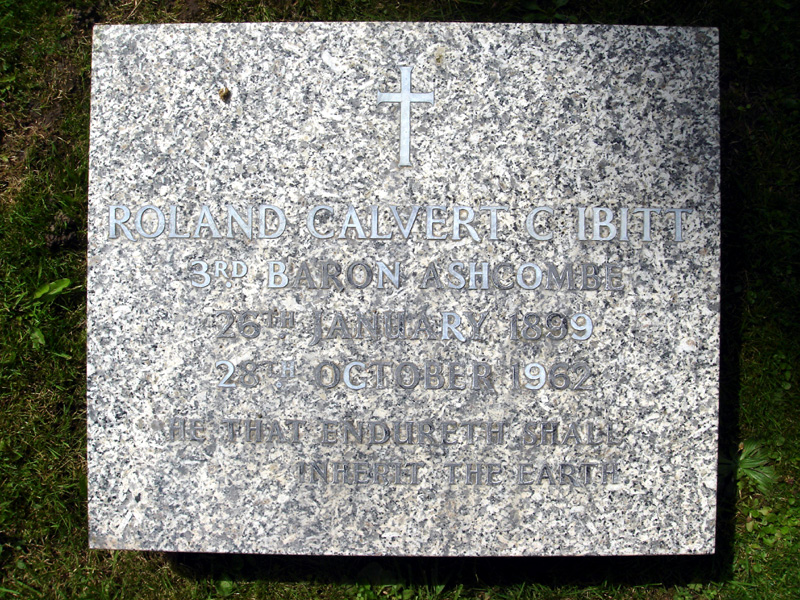
Roland Cubitt funerary monument, St Barnabas's Church, Ranmore Common, Surrey

He died on 28 October 1962 is buried in the churchyard of St Barnabas's Church, Ranmore Common, Surrey.

Peerage of the United Kingdom
Preceded by Henry Cubitt	Baron Ashcombe; 1947–1962	Succeeded by Henry Cubitt
