= Rosalind Shand =

Mother of Queen Camilla (1921–1994)

The Honourable Rosalind Shand
- Born: Rosalind Maud Cubitt; 11 August 1921; London, England
- Died: 14 July 1994 (aged 72); Lewes, East Sussex, England
- Occupation: Charity worker
- Spouse: Bruce Shand (m. 1946)
- Children: Camilla, Queen of the United Kingdom; Annabel Elliot; Mark Shand
- Parents: Roland Cubitt, 3rd Baron Ashcombe (father); Sonia Rosemary Keppel (mother)

Rosalind Maud Shand (née Cubitt; 11 August 1921 – 14 July 1994) was the daughter of Roland Cubitt, 3rd Baron Ashcombe. She was the wife of army officer Major Bruce Shand and the mother of Queen Camilla.

== Childhood ==
Rosalind Maud Cubitt was born at 16 Grosvenor Street, London, on 11 August 1921, the eldest of the three children born to Roland Calvert Cubitt (1899–1962) and his wife Sonia Rosemary Cubitt (née Keppel; 1900–1986). Her father was the son of Henry Cubitt, 2nd Baron Ashcombe, and became 3rd Baron Ashcombe after his death. Rosalind's mother Sonia was the youngest daughter of George Keppel and his wife, Alice Frederica Keppel (née Edmonstone).

Rosalind had two younger siblings: Henry Cubitt, who succeeded his father as the 4th Baron Ashcombe, and Jeremy Cubitt, who died in 1958 at the age of 30. Her family was the aristocratic and wealthy Cubitt family, which founded the Cubitt construction company. She was a goddaughter of Dame Margaret Greville and inherited some of her fortune.

Rosalind was named by the press as the 1939 'Debutante of the Year'. She had her debutante ball on 6 July 1939 at Holland House in Kensington, London. It was attended by more than a thousand guests including King George VI and Queen Elizabeth, and Noël Coward. The ball was the last such event held at the house before it was destroyed during the Second World War.

== Marriage and children ==
Rosalind met her future husband Major Bruce Middleton Hope Shand (1917–2006), son of English journalist Philip Morton Shand and his first wife Edith Marguerite Harrington, at the end of the Second World War. He later retired from the British Army after winning two Military Crosses and being a German prisoner of war. They married on 2 January 1946 at St Paul's Church, Knightsbridge in London. The couple bought a country house, The Laines in Plumpton, East Sussex, and also maintained another house in South Kensington.

They had three children:

- Camilla Rosemary Shand (born 17 July 1947), whose first marriage was to Andrew Parker Bowles and had two children, in 2005 she went on to marry Charles, Prince of Wales (later Charles III):
  - Thomas Henry Charles Parker Bowles (born 1974)
  - Laura Rose Lopes née Parker Bowles (born 1978)

- Sonia Annabel Shand (born 2 February 1949) married Simon Elliot and had three children:
  - Benjamin William Elliot (born 1975)
  - Alice Rosalind Irwin née Elliot (born 1977)
  - Katie Camilla Elliot (born 1981)
- Mark Roland Shand (28 June 1951 – 23 April 2014) married Clio Goldsmith and had a child:
  - Ayesha Shand (born 1995)

== Career and charity work ==
Rosalind worked for an adoption agency before marriage. She volunteered at the Chailey Heritage Foundation, which helps young children with disabilities, in the 1960s and 1970s located at North Chailey, East Sussex. She worked there as a volunteer for 17 years. Her daughter Camilla opened a new facility there in 2013.

== Death ==
She died at Lewes, East Sussex on 14 July 1994 aged 72, having long suffered from osteoporosis. Her mother Sonia also died from the same disease in 1986. She was survived by her husband, her three children and five grandchildren. Her youngest granddaughter, Ayesha, was born a year after her death.

Following her mother's death, Camilla became a member of the National Osteoporosis Society, which later became Royal Osteoporosis Society (a charity dedicated to improving the diagnosis, prevention and treatment of osteoporosis) in 1994 to help raise awareness of the disease, became Patron of the charity in 1997 and was appointed its president in 2001.

== Books cited ==
- Brandreth, Gyles (2007). Charles and Camilla: Portrait of a Love Affair. Random House. ISBN 978-0-09-949087-6.
- MacCarthy, Fiona (2006). Last Curtsey: The End of the Debutantes. Faber & Faber. ISBN 978-0571228591.
- Mitford, Deborah (2010). Wait for Me!: Memoirs. Farrar, Straus and Giroux. ISBN 978-0374207687.
- Lambert, Angela (2011). 1939: The Last Season of Peace. Bloomsbury Reader.
