= List of LB&SCR D1 class locomotives =

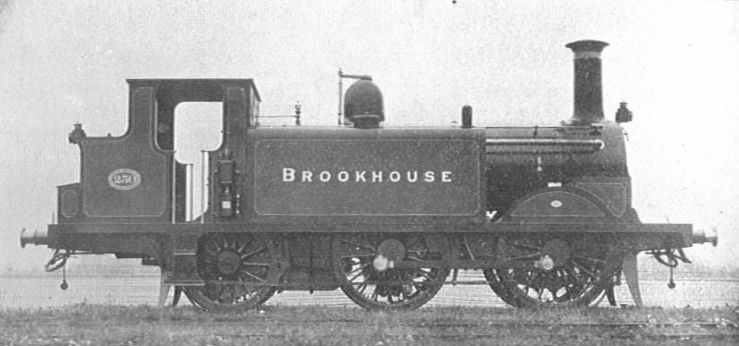
No. 230 Brookhouse

Below are the names and numbers of the steam locomotives that comprised the LB&SCR D1 class, that ran on the London, Brighton and South Coast Railway, and latterly the Southern Railway network. The class names mainly denoted various places served by the LB&SCR. All locomotives were built at Brighton Works unless otherwise noted.

Fleet list
Original LBSCR Number	Renumbered						Into service	Notes	Withdrawn
1 Sydenham	684	B684					November 1873		November 1926
2 Wandsworth	75	298	B298	2298			December 1873		June 1933
3 Battersea (Note: Name retained until withdrawal)							December 1873		December 1903
4 Mickleham							January 1874	Allocated to Epsom Shed.	July 1907
5 Streatham	605	B605	2605				January 1874		November 1948
6 Wimbledon	76	299	B299	2299			January 1874		August 1949
7 Bermondsey	607						March 1874		December 1912
8 Brockley							March 1874		April 1904
9 Anerley							April 1874		July 1904
10 Banstead							April 1874		October 1904
11 Selhurst							June 1874		July 1906
12 Wallington	612	B612	2612				July 1874		October 1934
13 Pimlico	77	77A	347	214	B214	2214	December 1874		August 1933
14 Chelsea	614	B614	2614				December 1874		May 1936
15 Brompton	615	B615	2615				January 1875		February 1937
16 Silverdale	616	B616	2616				March 1875		September 1938
17 Dulwich	617	B617					April 1875		November 1926
18 Stockwell	78	78A	348	215	B215	2215	May 1875	Converted for use as a fire engine during World War Two.	February 1950
19 Belmont	619						July 1875		June 1913
20 Carshalton	79	79A	349	216	B216	2216	July 1875	Rebuilt as D1X in 1910	August 1933
21 Beddington	621						July 1875		November 1912
22 Addington							August 1875		July 1906
23 Mayfield	23	623	B623	2623			August 1875		February 1934
24 Brambletye	624	B624					November 1875		November 1925
25 Rotherfield	625	B625	2625				March 1876		October 1940
26 Hartfield	626	B626	2626				March 1876		November 1940
27 Uckfield	627	B627	2627				March 1876		November 1943
28 Isfield	628						April 1876		December 1912
29 Lambeth	629	B629	2629				April 1876		January 1936
30 Camberwell	630						April 1876		June 1913
31 Borough	631	B631	2631				May 1876		August 1940
32 Walworth	80	80A	350	217	B217	2217	May 1876		June 1933
33 Mitcham	633	B633	2633				May 1876		February 1944
34 Balham	634	B634					June 1876		November 1926
35 Southwark	298 Southwark	698					June 1876		July 1923
36 New Cross	299 New Cross	699	B699	2699			June 1876		February 1948
221 Warbleton	221	B221	2221				July 1885		June 1940
222 Cuckmere	222						July 1885		July 1923
223 Balcombe	223						July 1885		July 1925
224 Crowhurst	224	B224	2224				June 1885		August 1940
225 Ashbourne	225						June 1885		March 1925
226 Westham	226	B226	2226				May 1885		June 1940
227 Heathfield	227	B227	2227				January 1885		March 1939
228 Seaford	228	B228	2228				December 1884		August 1933
229 Dorking	229	B229	2229				December 1884		November 1947
230 Brookhouse	230						October 1884		June 1926
231 Horsham	231	B231	2231				July 1884		September 1933
232 Lewes	232	B232	2232				July 1884		June 1944
233 Handcross	233	B233	2233				March 1883	Built by Neilson & Co., Glasgow	August 1944
234 Rottingdean	234	B234	2234				October 1881	Built by Neilson & Co., Glasgow	February 1950
235 Broadwater	235	B235	2235				October 1881	Built by Neilson & Co., Glasgow	May 1949
236 Ardingley	236 Ardingly	236	B236				November 1881	Built by Neilson & Co., Glasgow	November 1926
237 Cuckfield	237	B237	2237				November 1881	Built by Neilson & Co., Glasgow	August 1940
238 Lindfield	238						November 1881	Built by Neilson & Co., Glasgow	December 1925
239 Patcham	239	B239	2239				November 1881	Built by Neilson & Co., Glasgow; Converted for use as a fire engine during World War Two.	March 1948
240 Ditchling	240	B240	2240				November 1881	Built by Neilson & Co., Glasgow	August 1946
241 Stanmer	241	B241	2241				November 1881	Built by Neilson & Co., Glasgow	July 1933
242 Ringmer	242						November 1881	Built by Neilson & Co., Glasgow	July 1925
243 Ovingdean	243						November 1881	Built by Neilson & Co., Glasgow	October 1925
244 Hassocks	244	B244	2244	700S			December 1881	Built by Neilson & Co., Glasgow; Converted for use as a fire engine during World War Two.	May 1949
245 Withdean	245						December 1881	Built by Neilson & Co., Glasgow	November 1926
246 Bramber	246	B246					December 1881	Built by Neilson & Co., Glasgow	November 1926
247 Arlington	247	B247	2247				December 1881	Built by Neilson & Co., Glasgow	April 1938
248 Ashurst	248	B248	2248				December 1881	Built by Neilson & Co., Glasgow; Involved in an accident at Streatham Junction, November 1919. Rebuilt with larger side tanks.	June 1933
249 Hilsea	249	B249	2249				December 1881	Built by Neilson & Co., Glasgow	April 1938
250 Hoathly	250						December 1881	Built by Neilson & Co., Glasgow	November 1925
251 Singleton	251	B251					December 1881	Built by Neilson & Co., Glasgow	April 1926
252 Buckhurst	252	B252	2252				January 1882	Built by Neilson & Co., Glasgow; Converted for use as a fire engine during World War Two.	September 1950
253 Pelham	253	B253	2253				January 1882	Built by Neilson & Co., Glasgow; Converted for use as a fire engine during World War Two.	September 1949
254 Hambledon	254	B254	2254				February 1882	Built by Neilson & Co., Glasgow	November 1940
255 Willingdon	255	B255	2255				February 1882	Built by Meilson & Co., Glasgow; Converted for use as a fire engine during World War Two.	January 1947
256 Stanford	256	B256	2256				March 1882	Built by Neilson & Co., Glasgow	December 1933
257 Brading	257						March 1882	Built by Neilson & Co., Glasgow	November 1926
258 Cosham	258	B258					March 1882	Built by Neilson & Co., Glasgow	November 1926
259 Telford	259 Barnham	259	B259	2259			March 1882	Built by Neilson & Co., Glasgow	March 1948
260 Lavington	260	B260	2260				March 1882	Built by Neilson & Co., Glasgow; Converted for use as a fire engine during World War Two.	July 1946
261 Wigmore	261	B261	2261				April 1882	Built by Neilson & Co., Glasgow	May 1938
262 Oxted	262	B262	2262				April 1882	Built by Neilson & Co., Glasgow	April 1933
263 Purley	263						April 1882	Built by Neilson & Co., Glasgow	June 1913
264 Langston	264	B264					May 1882	Built by Neilson & Co., Glasgow	November 1926
265 Chipstead	265	B265					May 1882	Built by Neilson & Co., Glasgow	November 1926
266 Charlwood	266	B266	2266				May 1882	Built by Neilson & Co., Glasgow	June 1934
267 Maresfield	267	B267	2267				May 1882	Built by Neilson, Glasgow, works number 2736/1882	January 1935
268 Baynards	268	B268					May 1880		September 1926
269 Crawley	269	B269	2269				May 1880		September 1948
270 Warnham	270	B270	2270				May 1880		July 1940
271 Eridge	271						May 1880		June 1928
272 Nevill	272 Goring	272					May 1880		August 1925
273 Dornden	273	B273	2273				April 1880		July 1936
274 Guildford	274	B274	2274				December 1879		February 1950
275 Cranleigh	275	B275	2275				December 1879		October 1940
276 Rudgwick	276	B276	2276				December 1879		December 1935
277 Slinfold	277						December 1879		November 1926
278 Groombridge	278						December 1879		August 1926
279 Tunbridge Wells	279	B279	2279				December 1879		January 1936
280 Grinstead	280	B280					November 1879		June 1926
281 Withyham	281						November 1879		December 1926
282 Rowfant	282	B282	2282				October 1879		February 1936
283 Aldgate	283	B283	2283				October 1879		November 1948
284 Ashburnham	284	B284	2284	Oil Pump No.2		701S	September 1879		December 1951
285 Holmwood	285						September 1879		November 1926
286 Ranmore	286	B286	2286				July 1879	Allocated to Epsom Shed.	July 1948
287 Buryhill	287						July 1879		December 1925
288 Effingham	288	B288	2288				July 1879		May 1937
289 Holmbury	289	B289	2289				July 1879		July 1948
290 Denbies	290	B290	2290				June 1879		March 1936
291 Deepdene	291						May 1879		October 1926
292 Leigham	292	B292					November 1877		November 1926
293 Norbury	293						October 1877		December 1925
294 Rosebury	294 Falmer	294	B294	2294			November 1877		May 1936
295 Whippingham	295	B295	2295				October 1877		June 1937
296 Osborne	296 Peckham	296	B296	2296			October 1877		December 1933
297 Bonchurch	297	B297	2297				December 1877	Derailed between Mayfield and Heathfield on 1 September 1897, driver killed.	September 1937
351 Chailey	351	218	B218				January 1886		February 1927
352 Lavant	352	219	B219	2219			January 1886		November 1933
353 Keymer	353	220	B220	2220			January 1886	Converted for use as a fire engine during World War Two.	August 1946
354 Lancing	354						May 1886		April 1925
355 Worthing	355	B355	2355				May 1886		September 1946
356 Coulsdon	356	B356	2356				November 1886		May 1940
357 Riddlesdown	357	B357	2357	1 James Fryers			July 1886	Converted for use as a fire engine during World War Two. Sold to the Whittingham Hospital Railway after withdrawal. Ultimately scrapped in 1956 as the last member of the class	March 1947
358 Henfield	358	B358	2358				November 1886		November 1948
359 Egmont	359	B359	2359	32359			December 1886	The only D1 to carry a British Railways number.	July 1951
360 Leconfield	360						January 1887		September 1927
361 Upperton	361	B361	2361				January 1887		March 1948
362 Kidbrooke	362						March 1887		October 1927

The names were removed when the locomotive was either renumbered into the 600s, or repainted into the umber livery. Seven locomotives were still in ochre livery and carrying their original numbers when withdrawn, these retained their names until withdrawal.

== Sources ==
- Bradley, D.L. (June 1972). Locomotives of the L.B.&S.C.R.: Part 2. London: RCTS. ISBN 0-901115-21-5. OCLC 749652689.
- Haresnape, Brian (1985). Stroudley Locomotives. Shepperton: Ian Allan Ltd. ISBN 0-7110-1391-8.
- Robertson, Kevin (2004). London, Brighton & South Coast Miscellany. Hersham: Oxford Publishing Co. ISBN 0-86093-583-3.
- Cooper, Basil K (1991). Railcentres: Brighton (2nd ed.). Shepperton: Ian Allan Ltd. ISBN 0-7110-1155-9.
