= Henry Cubitt =

Henry Cubitt may refer to:

- Henry Cubitt, 2nd Baron Ashcombe (1867–1947), British politician and peer
- Henry Cubitt, 4th Baron Ashcombe (1924–2013), British peer
