= Walter Crichton =

Archdeacon of Madras (1929–1937)

Walter Richard Crichton was Archdeacon of Madras from 1929 to 1937.

Crichton was educated at Trinity College, Dublin and ordained in 1908. After curacies in Seagoe and Hillsborough he went with the Eccles Establishment to India. He served at Cannanore, Ootacamund, Secunderabad, Trichinopoly, Bellary, George Town, Chennai, Wellington and Fort St. George. Returning from India in 1931 he held incumbencies at Ranmore and Plaistow.

He died on 29 April 1942.
