= Denbies Wine Estate =

Vineyard in Surrey, England

Coordinates: 51.2477°N 0.3318°W

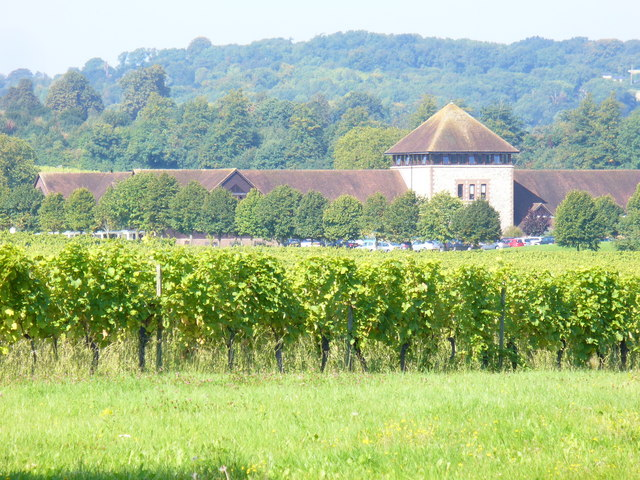
The vineyard, looking towards the visitor centre

Denbies Wine Estate, near Dorking, Surrey, has the largest vineyard in England, with 265 acres (1.07 km^{2}) under vines, representing more than 10 per cent of the plantings in the whole of the United Kingdom. It has a visitors' centre that attracts around 300,000 visits a year.

== History ==
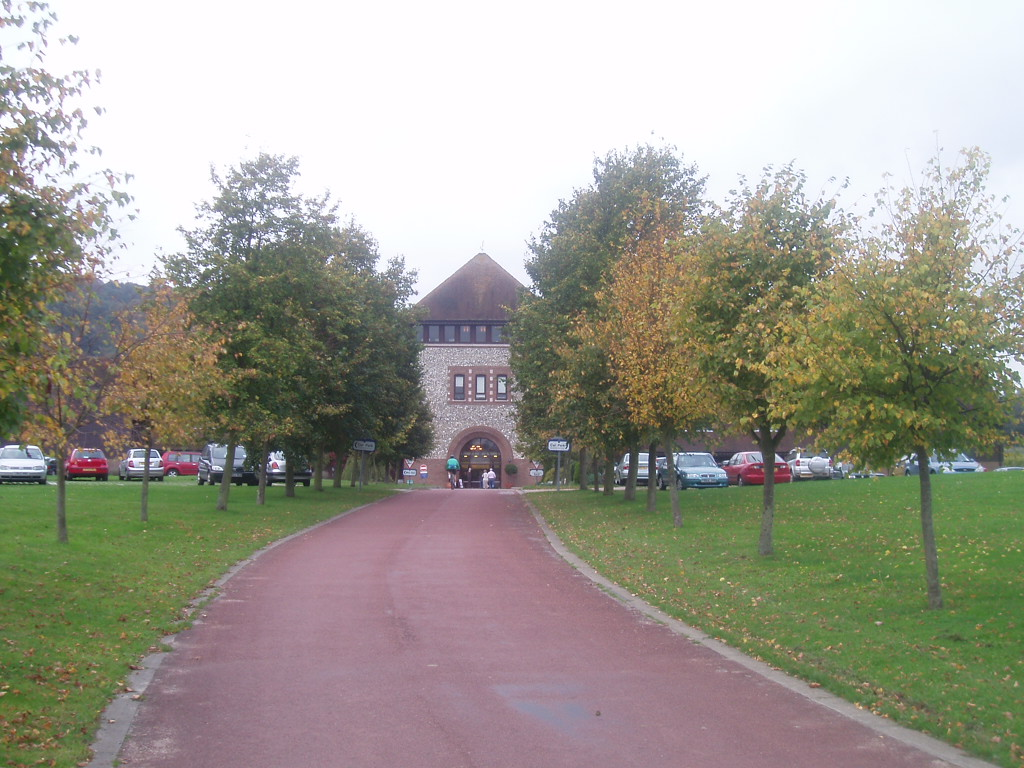
Driveway approaching visitor centre

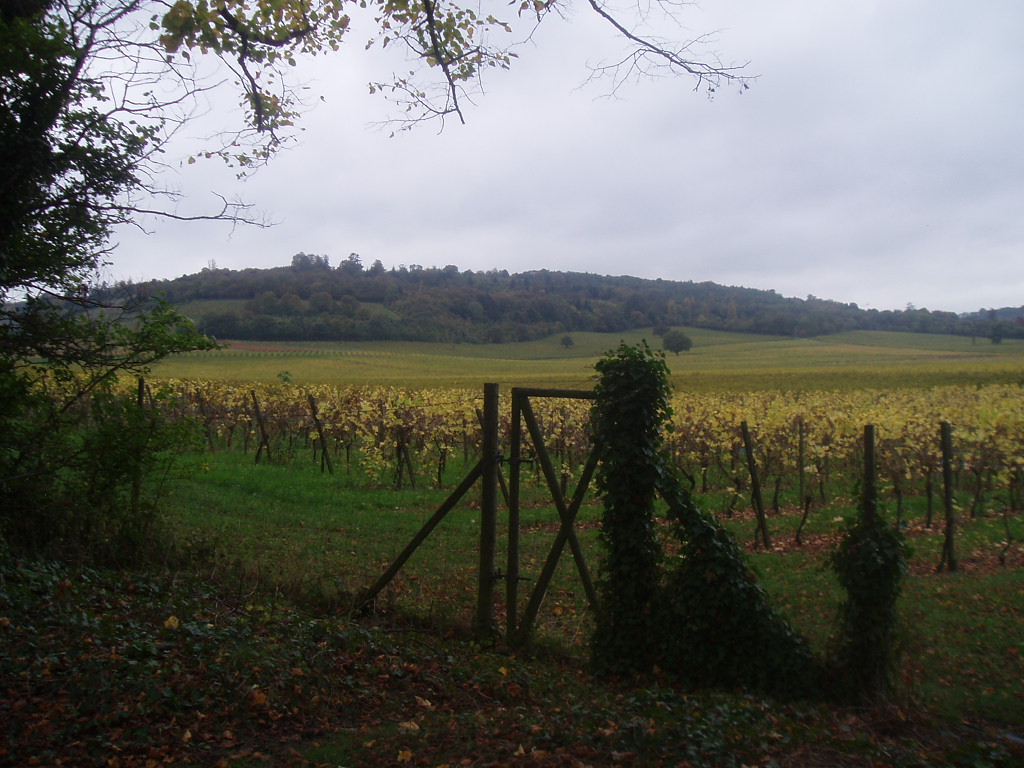
Vines at Denbies, looking towards Ranmore Common (taken in autumn). Denbies house would have been visible on the brow of the hill.

The estate takes its name from John Denby, who owned the farmhouse in the 16th century. In the mid-18th century Denby's farm buildings were converted into a gentleman's residence by Jonathan Tyers, proprietor of Vauxhall Gardens near London. Tyers' garden at Denbies was in startling contrast to the frivolities of Vauxhall, being adorned with memento mori ("reminders of death"). The property passed through other hands, and in the 1850s it was rebuilt, much greater, by pre-eminent early Victorian master builder Thomas Cubitt. He was visited at Denbies by Prince Albert, who planted a commemorative tree which survived until the Great Storm of 1990. The house remained in that family except in World War II when it was requisitioned by the military. In the 1950s Cubitt's great-grandson decided to demolish the house as he lacked the funds to restore and maintain it. He converted the laundry and gardener's house into a smaller Regency-style house. The heartland of the estate, earlier parcels having been sold, was purchased by Biwater in the 1980s with development later by local businessman Adrian White. The estate is owned and operated by the White family, who planted the vineyard in 1986.

== Wine production ==
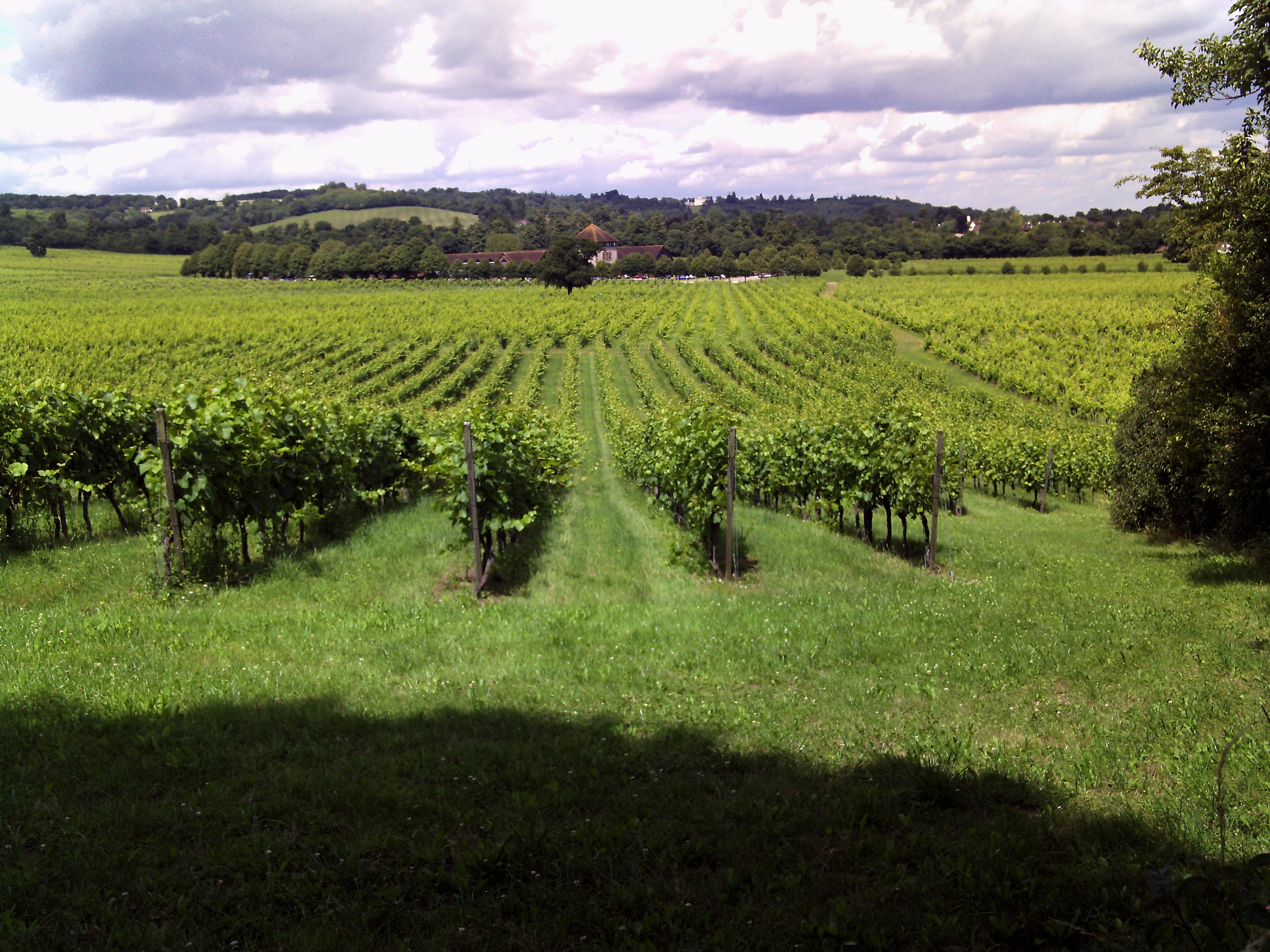
Vineyard, July 2009

Denbies is situated on the North Downs, which are a range of chalk hills the topsoil of which consists of fertile loam interspersed with flints. From 1986 to 1989 White had the south-facing slopes planted with vines, which cover 265 acres (1.07 km^{2}) of the 627-acre (2.54 km^{2}) estate, the remainder of which is woodland and pasture. The average yield is 300,000 litres of wine per year.

Around 65 per cent of Denbies' wine is sold at the visitors' centre, and the remainder through supermarkets, wholesalers and via mail order.

In 2010 Denbies Chalk Ridge Rosé won the IWC international Gold award, beating more than 360 competitors from 21 countries. The IWC wine challenge is the world's biggest and most influential wine competition.

== Facilities ==
=== Visitors' centre ===
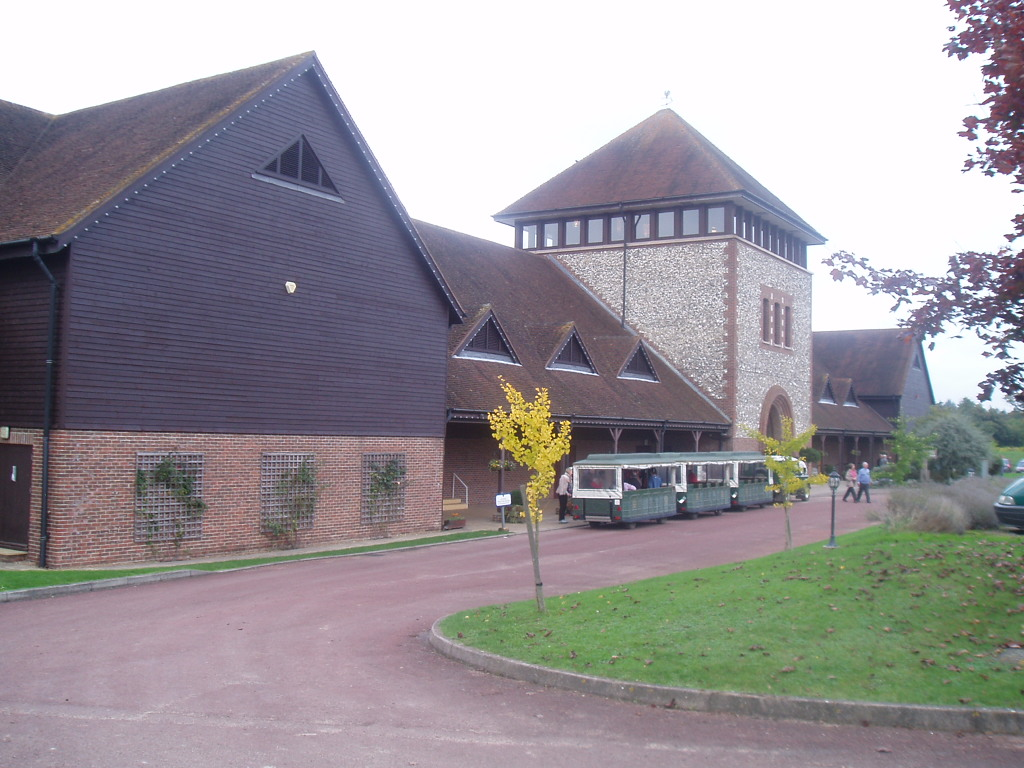
Visitor centre, with tour bus

The visitors' centre occupies a double courtyard building in the local vernacular style. It features a working winery which visitors walk through while listening to commentary and having questions answered by an expert tour guide, wine cellars, 360° cinema, art gallery, lecture room, two restaurants and a shop. In the summer there are also tours of the vineyards.

=== Lego House ===
In August–September 2009, Denbies was the location chosen for the construction of James May's Lego House, built as part of the James May's Toy Stories BBC television series. The house was taken down less than a week after completion, as no planning permission had been obtained and a buyer for it could not be found.

=== Denbies Guest House ===
The estate runs Denbies Guest House in one its farmhouses and a kitchen garden centre. It offers venues and catering for corporate functions and weddings.

=== Surrey Performing Arts Library ===
The Surrey Performing Arts Library (a collection of materials covering music, dance, theatre and cinema, available for loan, and funded by Surrey County Council) was formerly based on the Denbies estate. In 2022 it was re-established as a charity, New Surrey Performing Arts Library (NewSPAL), and is now based at Bourne Hall, Ewell.

=== Mole Valley parkrun ===
Denbies Wine Estate agreed to allow a parkrun (weekly 5 kilometre runs) at the Vineyard. The inaugural event was in March 2018, won by Ollie Garrod of Epsom and Ewell Harriers running club.

The course is very difficult owing to two long, steep hills in the first half of the course. The second half is nearly all steep downhill.

Around 150 events have taken place. It was postponed for 16 months due to the COVID-19 pandemic between March 2020 and July 2021. The Wine Estate also regularly hosts other running events including the Surrey Cross Country Championships.
