= John Gorton (disambiguation) =

John Gorton (1911–2002) was an Australian politician who served as the 19th Prime Minister of Australia.

John Gorton may also refer to:

- John Gorton (cricketer) (1916–1995), South African cricketer for the Eastern Province team
- John Gorton (priest) (1821–1900), English Anglican Archdeacon
- John Gorton (writer) (d. 1835), English writer and reference compiler
