= Sonia Rosemary Keppel =

British socialite and aristocrat (1900–1986)

Sonia Cubitt The Honourable Mrs Cubitt
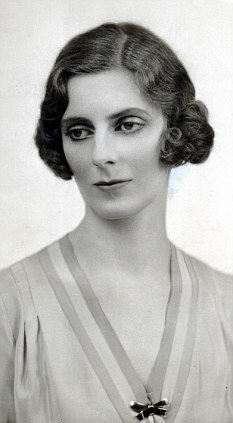
- Born: Sonia Rosemary Keppel; 24 May 1900; London, England
- Died: 16 August 1986 (aged 86); Hampshire, England
- Occupation: Author
- Spouse: Roland Calvert Cubitt (later 3rd Baron Ashcombe) (m. 1920; div. 1947)
- Children: 3, including Rosalind Shand; Henry Edward Cubitt, 4th Baron Ashcombe
- Parent(s): George Keppel (father); Alice Edmonstone (mother)
- Relatives: Camilla, Queen of the United Kingdom (granddaughter)

Sonia Rosemary Cubitt, OBE (née Keppel, previously The Hon. Mrs. Cubitt; 24 May 1900 – 16 August 1986) was a British socialite, author and aristocrat. She was the first wife of Roland Cubitt, 3rd Baron Ashcombe, and, through her only daughter Rosalind, was the maternal grandmother of Queen Camilla. Sonia is also known as the daughter of Alice Keppel, a mistress of King Edward VII.

== Childhood ==
Sonia Rosemary Keppel was born on 24 May 1900, as the youngest child of the Hon. George Keppel (1865–1947) and Alice Frederica Keppel (née Edmonstone; 1868–1947). Her mother was the youngest child of Sir William Edmonstone, 4th Baronet, while George was a son of William Keppel, 7th Earl of Albemarle, and his wife Sophia Mary Keppel (née MacNab). Sonia's mother Alice was a British society hostess and a long-time royal mistress of King Edward VII. She was a goddaughter of Dame Margaret Greville and inherited some of her fortune.

Sonia's only sibling was the English writer and socialite Violet Trefusis (née Keppel).

== Marriage and children ==
Sonia met her future husband, the Hon. Roland Calvert Cubitt, at the end of the First World War, shortly after the signing of the armistice in November 1918. Sonia was eighteen, Roland was nearing twenty and a young officer in the Coldstream Guards. He was the fourth of the six sons of Henry Cubitt, 2nd Baron Ashcombe; all three of his older brothers were killed in action during the First World War. Roland was heir to Ashcombe Barony and to a fortune established by his great-grandfather, Victorian builder Thomas Cubitt (1788–1855).

On 16 November 1920, Sonia and Roland married at the Guards Chapel of Wellington Barracks in London.

They had three children:

- Rosalind Maud Cubitt (1921–1994) m. Major Bruce Middleton Hope Shand and had three children:
  - Camilla Rosemary Shand (b. 17 July 1947), later Queen Camilla of the United Kingdom
  - Sonia Annabel Shand (b. 2 February 1949)
  - Mark Roland Shand (28 June 1951 – 23 April 2014)
- Henry Edward Cubitt (1924–2013) (who succeeded as the 4th Baron Ashcombe on the death of his father) m. Ghislaine Alexander (née Dresselhuys, ex-wife of Denis Alexander, 6th Earl of Caledon, and later The Baroness Foley)

m. Virginia Carington (daughter of Peter Carington, 6th Baron Carrington)
m. Mary Elizabeth Dent-Brocklehurst (née Chipps) (widow of late Mark Dent-Brocklehurst)

- Jeremy John Cubitt (1927–1958) m. Diana Edith Du Cane and had a child:
  - Sarah Victoria Cubitt (b. 1953)

The couple divorced on 4 July 1947, just a few months before Roland succeeded as the 3rd Baron Ashcombe. Hence Sonia was never styled Baroness Ashcombe. During her marriage she was styled the Hon. Mrs. Cubitt.

== Career ==
Sonia, like her sister Violet, was a writer. She wrote the books Three brothers at Havana, 1762 and The Sovereign Lady: A Life of Elizabeth Vassall, Third Lady Holland, with Her Family. She was appointed Officer, Order of the British Empire (O.B.E.) in 1959.

== Death ==
Sonia died on 16 August 1986 aged 86, after a long period of chronic osteoporosis. She was survived by her daughter Rosalind, elder son Henry and four grandchildren. Her younger son Jeremy predeceased her, dying at age 30 in 1958. Eight years later, in 1994, her daughter Rosalind also died from osteoporosis.

Sonia's granddaughter, the future Queen Camilla, became a member of the National Osteoporosis Society (a charity dedicated to improving the diagnosis, prevention and treatment of osteoporosis) in 1994 to help raise awareness of the disease. Camilla became patron of the charity in 1997 and was appointed its president in 2001.

== Memoir ==
In 1958, Sonia wrote her memoir titled Edwardian Daughter, in which she described what her childhood was like in the high-society of the Edwardian era. The memoir was dedicated to her daughter Rosalind.

== Books cited ==
- Brandreth, Gyles (2007). Charles and Camilla: Portrait of a Love Affair. Random House. ISBN 978-0-09-949087-6.
- Souhami, Diana (1996). Mrs. Keppel and her daughter. Harper Collins. ISBN 0-312-19517-6.
