= George Keppel =

George Keppel may refer to:

- George Keppel, 3rd Earl of Albemarle (1724–1772), British general, MP for Chichester
- George Keppel (Royal Navy officer), a captain of HMS Ardent (1778)
- George Keppel, 6th Earl of Albemarle (1799–1891), British general, MP for East Norfolk and Lymington
- George Keppel (British Army officer, born 1865) (1865–1947), British soldier and husband of Alice Keppel, the mistress of King Edward VII

== See also ==
- George Roos-Keppel (1866–1921), British soldier, Chief Commissioner of Khyber-Pakhtunkhwa
