= Baron Ashcombe =

Title in the Peerage of the United Kingdom

- Arms of Cubitt, Baron Ashcombe: Checquy or and gules, on a pile argent a lion's head erased sable
- Creation date: 22 August 1892
- Created by: Queen Victoria
- Peerage: Peerage of the United Kingdom
- First holder: George Cubitt
- Present holder: Mark Edward Cubitt, 5th Baron Ashcombe
- Heir apparent: Richard Robin Alexander Cubitt (b. 1995)
- Remainder to: the 1st Baron's heirs male of the body lawfully begotten.

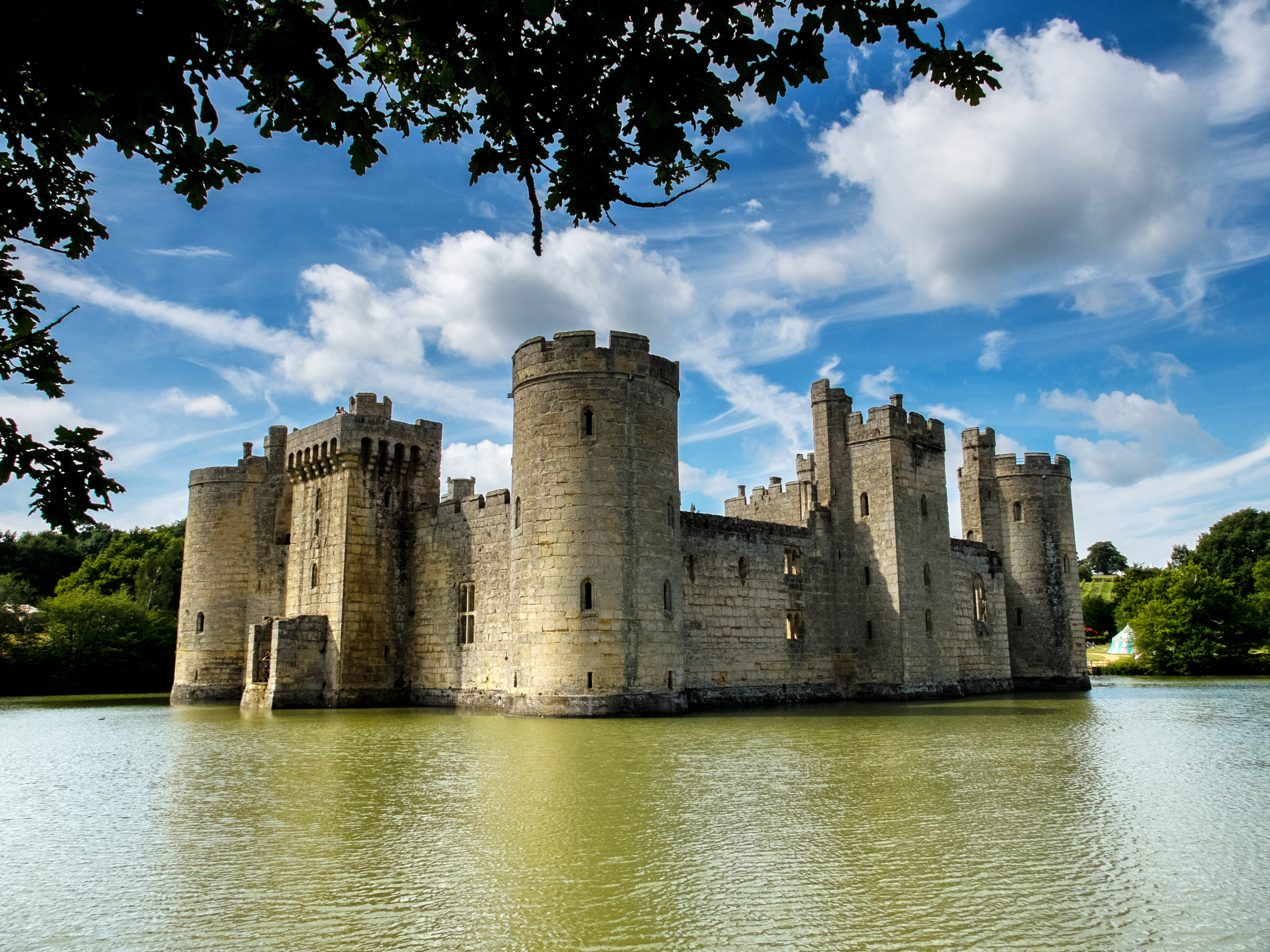
Bodiam Castle, Sussex

Baron Ashcombe, of Dorking in the County of Surrey and of Bodiam Castle in the County of Sussex, is a title in the Peerage of the United Kingdom. It was created in 1892 for the Conservative politician George Cubitt of Denbies House, Dorking, Surrey, who was continuously elected at elections over a 32-year period. (Note: In this time, he represented West Surrey, then its part successor Epsom.) He was the son of the builder Thomas Cubitt. Lord Ashcombe was succeeded by his son, the second Baron. He was a Conservative Member of Parliament and also served as Lord Lieutenant of Surrey. As of 2013, the title is held by his kinsman, the fifth Baron, who succeeded his first cousin, once removed in 2013.

Rosalind Shand, daughter of the third Baron, was the mother of Queen Camilla.

Bodiam Castle in East Sussex was purchased by the first Baron in 1874 held until his trustees sold in 1916. The family seat was then at Denbies House (Note: Replaced by the hotel and visitor centre of Denbies Wine Estate. See map created by Ordnance Survey, courtesy of English Heritage.) until its demolition in the 1950s. The 4th Baron Ashcombe resided at Sudeley Castle, Gloucestershire, which is still held by his widow. The current Lord Ashcombe lives at a private residence.

== Barons Ashcombe (1892) ==
- George Cubitt, 1st Baron Ashcombe (1828–1917)
- Henry Cubitt, 2nd Baron Ashcombe (1867–1947)
- Roland Calvert Cubitt, 3rd Baron Ashcombe (1899–1962)
- Henry Edward Cubitt, 4th Baron Ashcombe (1924–2013)
- Mark Edward Cubitt, 5th Baron Ashcombe (born 1964)

The heir apparent is the present holder's son, the Hon. Richard Robin Alexander Cubitt (born 1995).

=== Title succession chart ===
Title succession chart, Barons Ashcombe.

George Cubitt; 1st Baron Ashcombe; 1828–1917
Geoffrey Cubitt; 1854–1855	Thomas Cubitt; 1859–1865	Henry Cubitt; 2nd Baron Ashcombe; 1867–1947
Capt. Henry Cubitt; 1892–1916	Lt. Hon. Alick Cubitt; 1894–1917	Lt. Hon. William Cubitt; 1896–1918	Roland Cubitt; 3rd Baron Ashcombe; 1899–1962	Maj. Hon. Archibald Cubitt; 1901–1972
Henry Cubitt; 4th Baron Ashcombe; 1924–2013	Hon. Jeremy Cubitt; 1927–1958	Capt. Alick Cubitt; 1927–1983	Robin Cubitt; 1936–1991
Mark Cubitt; 5th Baron Ashcombe born 1964
Hon. Richard Cubitt born 1995
