= George Cubitt, 1st Baron Ashcombe =

British politician and peer

The Right Honourable The Lord Ashcombe PC DL
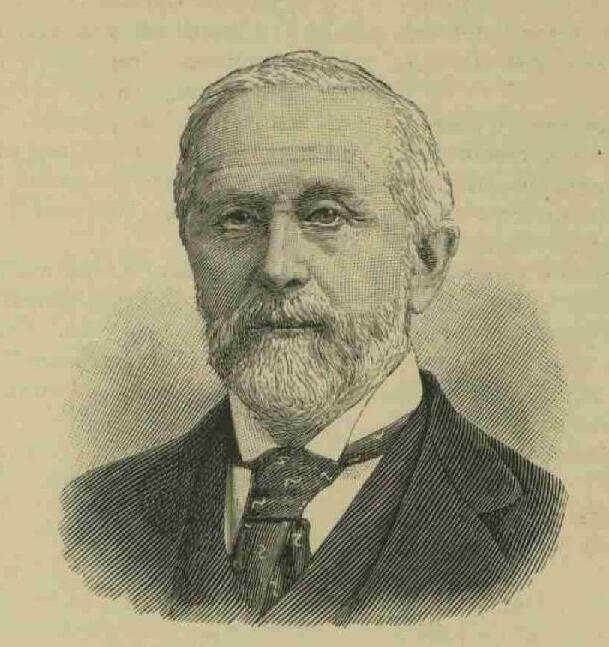
- Coat of arms: Cubitt arms.svg
- Born: George Cubitt; 4 June 1828
- Died: 26 February 1917 (aged 88)
- Spouse: Laura Joyce (m. 1853)
- Issue: Geoffrey Cubitt; Thomas Cubitt; Henry Cubitt, 2nd Baron Ashcombe; Helen Cubitt; Mary Chichester; Adelaide Fuller-Maitland; Mildred Tallents; Mabel Cubitt; Beatrice Calvert
- Parents: Thomas Cubitt; Mary Anne Warner
- Occupation: Politician

George Cubitt, 1st Baron Ashcombe, PC, DL (4 June 1828 – 26 February 1917) of Denbies House, Dorking, Surrey, was a British politician and peer, a son of Thomas Cubitt, the leading London builder and property developer of his day.

== Education and career ==
Cubitt was educated at Trinity College, Cambridge, where he graduated with first a BA and later took his honorary MA. He won election as a Conservative MP for West Surrey from 1860 to 1885, and then for Epsom until 1892, when elevated to the Lords as Baron Ashcombe, of Dorking, in the County of Surrey and of Bodiam Castle, in the County of Sussex, having been invested as a Privy Counsellor in 1880. He also served as Honorary Colonel of the 5th Battalion, Royal West Surrey Regiment, and Deputy Lieutenant of the counties of both Surrey and Middlesex.

Hansard shows he made 81 speeches or questions in Parliament, from 1863 to 1909, including contributing in four years of the 1890s and two years of the 1900s.

== Legacies ==
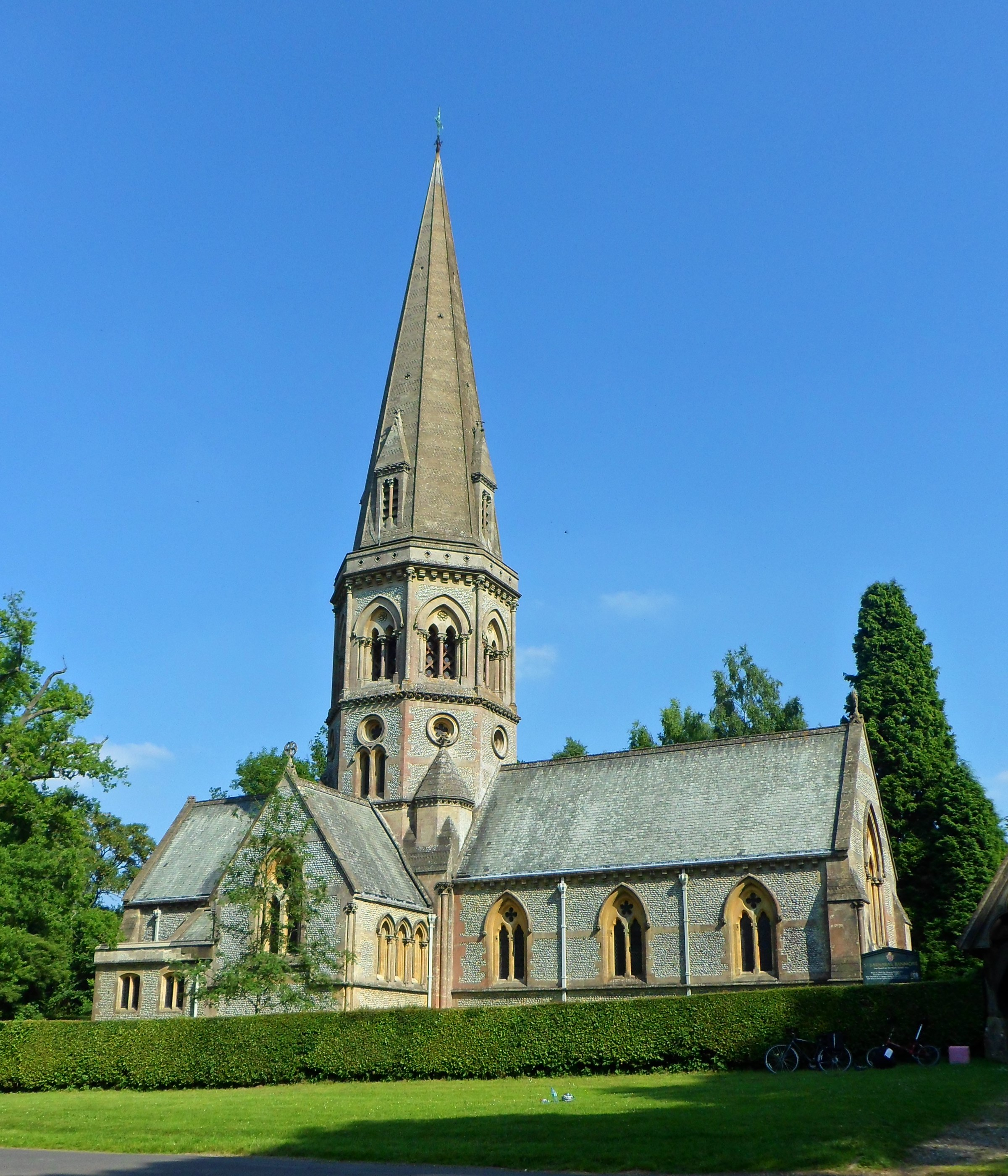
St Barnabas' Church at Ranmore Common (1859, by George Gilbert Scott) is one of several Anglican churches built in Mole Valley in the Victorian era.

Denbies, a large hillside north of Dorking, Surrey was part of the inheritance from his father; Cubitt lived in the mansion built by his father there until 1905, much of which has been taken up by a viticulture centre, spa hotel, restaurant and vineyard.

Upmarket street Ashcombe Road in Dorking is named after his peerage as is its amenity The Ashcombe School, the town's main senior school.

Through his funds he founded a landmark, hilltop church of St Barnabas, Ranmore Common, provided for the Denbies Estate's owners and employees. Collaborative historians' work the Victoria County History states it is "a handsome stone church, with chancel, nave, and aisles in 13th-century style".

Cubitt purchased Bodiam Castle and its 24 acres (9.7 ha) from Fuller's grandson in 1849, possibly local farmer Thomas Levett, descendant of an old Sussex family and owner of Court Lodge Farm a seller in a later smaller sale nearby, for over £5,000 (£550,000 today).. Lord Curzon decided that "so rare a treasure [as Bodiam Castle] should neither be lost to our country nor desecrated by irreverent hands". Curzon made enquiries about buying the castle, but Cubitt did not wish to sell. However, after Cubitt's death, Curzon was able to make a deal with Cubitt's son; he bought the castle and its lands in 1916. Curzon began a programme of investigation at Bodiam in 1919, and with architect William Weir more greatly restored parts of the castle. Its museum, design and authenticity make it a significant English tourist attraction.

While an MP for West Surrey, Cubitt and his wife Laura, Lady Ashcombe were among the founders and benefactors of St Catherine's School in Bramley, Surrey in 1885. One of the schoolhouses was named in his honour after his death. His wife's gift to the school was a Sanatorium, which cared for sick pupils. A stained glassed window in the school chapel, dedicated to St Cecilia, was created by Cubitt in remembrance of his wife after she died in 1904. The patron of the school is their great-great-granddaughter Queen Camilla.

His will passed assets worth £42,168 (equivalent to about £2,500,000 in 2025) its executor being his surviving son.

== Death and burial ==
He died on 26 February 1917 and was buried in the churchyard of St Barnabas's.

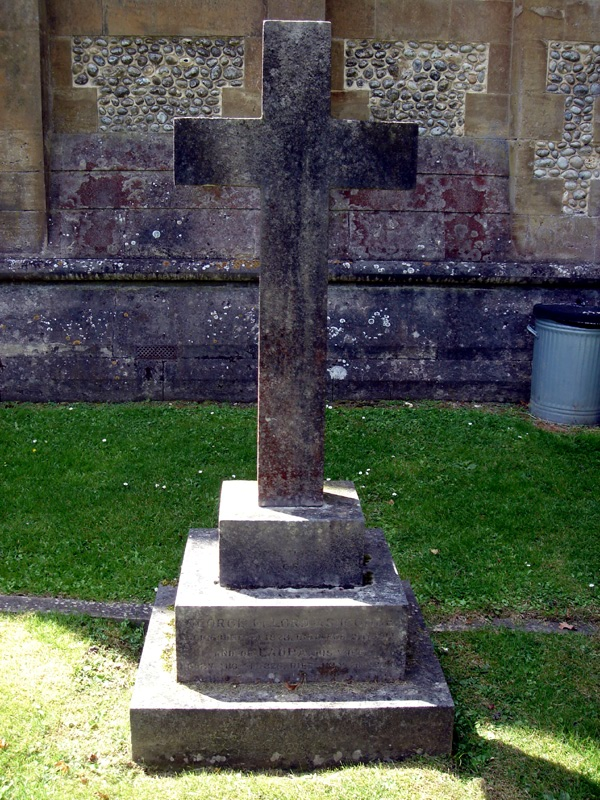
George Cubitt funerary monument, St Barnabas's Church, Ranmore Common, Surrey

== Family ==
Cubitt married Laura Joyce, daughter of Rev. James Joyce, Vicar of Dorking, on 14 June 1853 and with her had 9 children; 3 sons, though only the third, Henry, survived beyond infancy, and 6 daughters, one of whom died in infancy:

- Geoffrey George Cubitt (born 31 May 1854, died 6 June 1855)
- Thomas Edmund Wilfred Cubitt (born 5 August 1859, died 17 May 1865)
- Henry Cubitt (born 14 March 1867, died 27 October 1947) - succeeded his father as the 2nd Baron Ashcombe
- Helen Laura Cubitt (died 16 August 1939)
- Mary Agnes Cubitt (died 6 February 1944) - married Rev. Edward Arthur Chichester
- Adelaide Laura Cubitt (died 3 November 1922) - married Richard Anthony Fuller-Maitland
- Mildred Sophia Cubitt (died 9 March 1930) - married George William Tallents
- Mabel Georgina Cubitt (died 5 November 1865)
- Beatrice Hayward Cubitt (died 12 February 1963) - married William Archibald Calvert

He is the maternal great-great grandfather of Queen Camilla, wife of King Charles III.

Parliament of the United Kingdom
Preceded by Henry Drummond; John Ivatt Briscoe	Member of Parliament for West Surrey; 1860–1885; With: John Ivatt Briscoe, to 1870; Lee Steere, 1870–1880; St John Brodrick, 1880–1885	Constituency abolished
New constituency	Member of Parliament for Epsom; 1885–1892	Succeeded by Sir Thomas Bucknill
Church of England titles
Preceded by Sir Thomas Dyke Acland	Second Church Estates Commissioner; 1874–1879	Succeeded by Thomas Salt
Peerage of the United Kingdom
New creation	Baron Ashcombe; 1892–1917	Succeeded by Henry Cubitt
