= Adrian Foley, 8th Baron Foley =

British hereditary peer, composer and pianist

The Right Honourable The Lord Foley
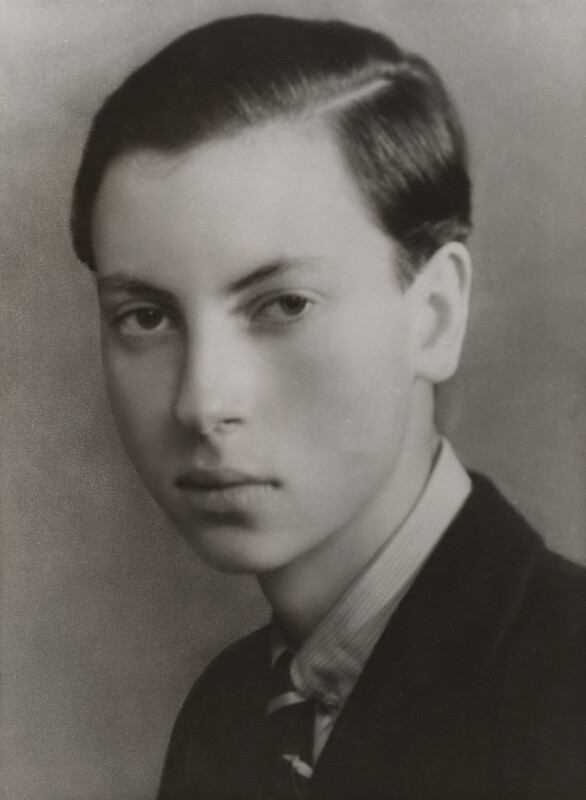
- Foley in 1939

Member of the House of Lords
- Lord Temporal
- In office 31 January 1945 – 11 November 1999 as a hereditary peer
- Preceded by: The 7th Baron Foley
- Succeeded by: Seat abolished (Note: Pursuant to the House of Lords Act 1999.)

Personal details
- Born: Adrian Gerald Foley; 9 August 1923
- Died: 12 February 2012 (aged 88)
- Party: Crossbench
- Spouse(s): Patricia Meek Zoellner (m. 1958; div. 1971) Ghislaine Dresselhuys (m. 1972; died 2000) Hannah Steinberg (m. 2003)
- Children: 2

Adrian Gerald Foley, 8th Baron Foley (9 August 1923 – 12 February 2012), was a British hereditary peer, composer and pianist.

Upon the death of his father, Gerald Foley, 7th Baron Foley, in 1927, Foley succeeded to his title at the age of three. He wrote London I Cannot Leave You (1940) at the age of 17, having spent his childhood in Eastbourne. In 1942, he supported Britain's Soviet ally with the composition of the song, "Wishing You Well, Mr Stalin". He composed music for the films Piccadilly Incident (1946) and Bond Street (1947). He appeared on an episode of the American game show To Tell the Truth in 1957.

== Personal life ==
In 1958, he met a wealthy American heiress, Patricia Meek, née Zoellner, during a stage production of Jane Eyre, produced by Huntington Hartford in New York City. On 23 December 1958, the couple married. They had two children: Alexandra Mary (born 1960) and Thomas Henry (born 1961), before divorcing in 1971. In 1972, he married another wealthy heiress, Ghislaine (née Dresselhuys; former wife of both the 6th Earl of Caledon and the 4th Baron Ashcombe), the only daughter of Dutch-born Long Island resident and former Consul of the Netherlands in London, Cornelius William Dresselhuys and Edith Merandon du Plessis. His second wife died in 2000. On 15 December 2003, he married his third wife, Hannah Steinberg, a member of the Wolfson family.

== Death ==
Lord Foley enjoyed golf and maintained properties near to the golfing areas of the Andalusian region of Spain for several decades. He owned property in Belgravia, London, and lived in retirement near Marbella until his death in Kidderminster in 2012, aged 88.

== Notes ==
Peerage of Great Britain
Preceded by Gerald Foley	Baron Foley; 2nd creation 1927–2012; Member of the House of Lords (1945–1999)	Succeeded by Thomas Foley
