= Mark Cubitt, 5th Baron Ashcombe =

British peer (born 1964)

The Right Honourable The Lord Ashcombe
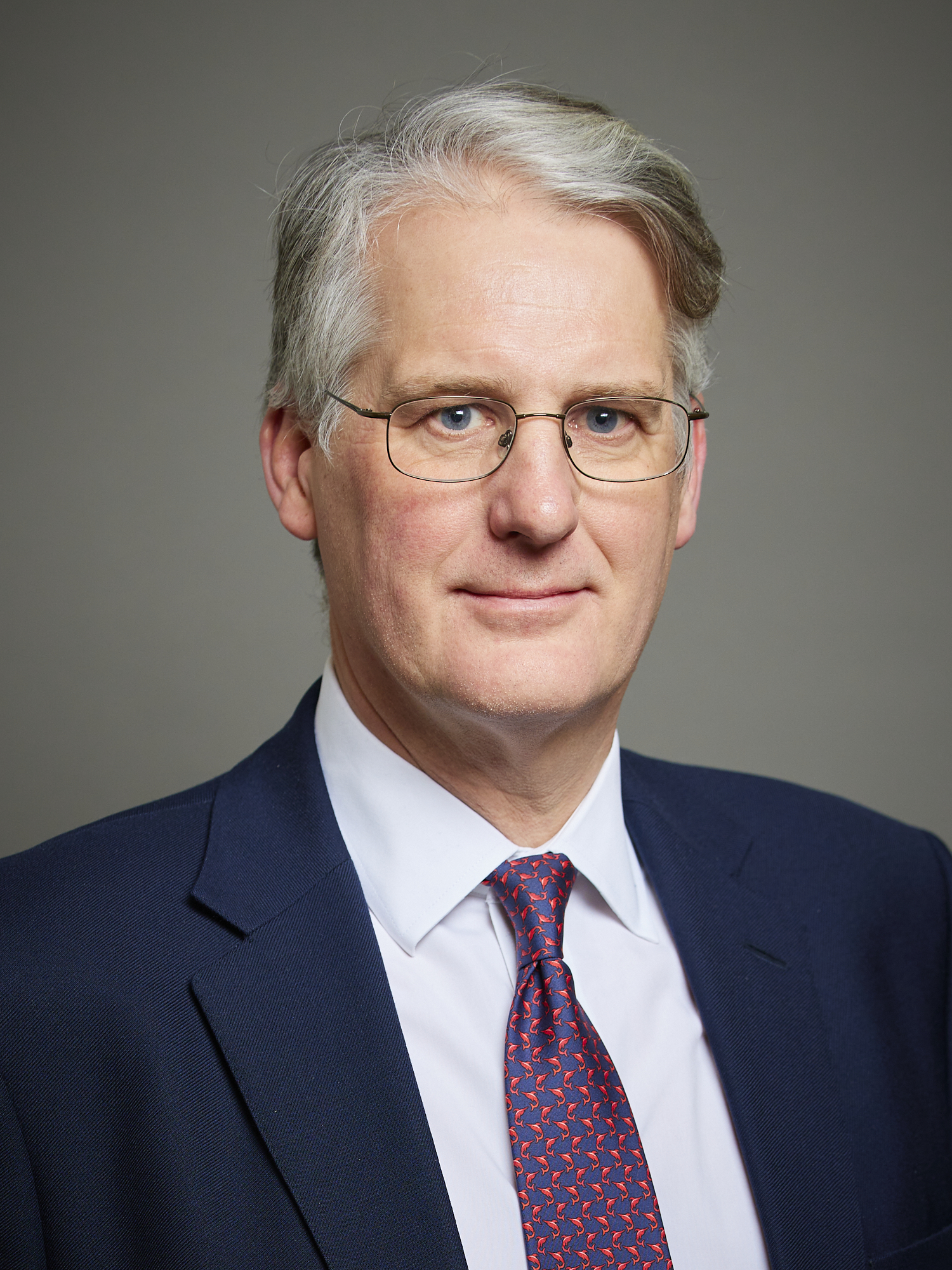
- Official portrait, 2023

Member of the House of Lords
- Lord Temporal
- Elected Hereditary Peer; 28 October 2022 – 29 April 2026
- By-election: 2022
- Preceded by: The 15th Earl of Home
- Succeeded by: Seat abolished
- Incumbent
- Life peerage 11 June 2026

Personal details
- Born: Mark Edward Cubitt; 29 February 1964 (age 62)
- Party: Conservative

Coat of arms of Cubitt, Baron Ashcombe: Chequy Or and Gules on a pile Argent, a lion's head erased Sable

Mark Edward Cubitt, 5th Baron Ashcombe, Baron Ashcombe of Boldre (born 29 February 1964), is a British hereditary peer and Conservative politician. In an October 2022 by-election, he was elected to replace the Earl of Home in the House of Lords following Home's death in August 2022.

He is a second cousin of Queen Camilla.

According to his candidate statement of 2022, Cubitt has a degree in civil engineering from Imperial College London, and has spent his career in the insurance industry, specialising in the energy sector. He lives in London and Hampshire.

== Electoral history ==
Ashcombe first stood in a House of Lords by-election in November 2015, receiving a single vote and coming 9th of 14 candidates.

His second by-election outing was in July 2018, where he received two votes and came 4th of 11 candidates.

In January 2019, Ashcombe tried again, polling 13 first preference votes, but dropped to 9th place of 17 candidates.

Ashcombe's fourth attempt was in January 2021, when on a low turnout he received a single vote, coming 9th of 21 candidates.

He skipped the July 2021 by-election.

His fifth outing was in February 2022 when he received 5 votes and jumped to 3rd place of 10 candidates. Just a month later Ashcombe gained 12 votes to come 2nd of 9 candidates. But in July 2022 he dropped to 7 votes and whilst coming 2nd of 12 candidates on the first count, he slipped to third place on the fifth count due to poor transfers from eliminated candidates. In early October he received 18 votes but slipped to 4th place in a field of 21 candidates.

In late October 2022, at the 9th time of asking, Ashcombe was elected with 10 first-preference votes, and elected on the 6th count.

He was removed the House of Lords by the coming into force of the House of Lords (Hereditary Peers) Act 2026. His membership was terminated on 29 April. On 12 May it was announced that he would be reappointed as a life peer. On 11 June he was created Baron Ashcombe of Boldre, of Boldre in the County of Hampshire and on 15 June he resumed his seat.

Peerage of the United Kingdom
Preceded by Henry Cubitt	Baron Ashcombe; 2013–present	Incumbent; Heir apparent: Hon. Richard Cubitt
Parliament of the United Kingdom
Preceded by The Earl of Home	Elected hereditary peer to the House of Lords under the House of Lords Act 1999; 2022–2026	Position abolished under the House of Lords (Hereditary Peers) Act 2026
