= John Gorton (priest) =

Archdeacon of Madras (1871–1875)

John Gorton (30 January 1821 – 2 September 1900) was an Anglican Archdeacon in India in the mid 19th century.

Gorton was born at Tickhill, and was educated at Wadham College, Oxford, where he matriculated in 1839, graduating B.A. in 1842 and M.A. in 1845. He was ordained in 1844. After a curacy at Harrow-on-the-Hill he went out with the Eccles Establishment to India, rising to be Archdeacon of Madras from 1871 to 1875.
