= Henry Cubitt, 2nd Baron Ashcombe =

British politician

The Right Honourable The Lord Ashcombe CB TD
- Born: Henry Edward Cubitt; 14 March 1867; Stowmarket, Suffolk, England
- Died: 27 October 1947 (aged 80); Surrey, England
- Spouse: Maud Marianne Calvert (m. 1890)
- Issue: Henry Cubitt; Alick Cubitt; William Cubitt; Roland Cubitt, 3rd Baron Ashcombe; Archibald Cubitt; Charles Cubitt
- Parents: George Cubitt, 1st Baron Ashcombe; Laura Joyce

Henry Edward Cubitt, 2nd Baron Ashcombe CB TD (14 March 1867 – 27 October 1947), was a British politician and peer, the son of George Cubitt, 1st Baron Ashcombe, and his wife Laura Joyce. He is also the great-grandfather of Queen Camilla.

== Education and career ==
Cubitt was educated at Eton and Trinity College, Cambridge. He was Conservative Party Member of Parliament (MP) for Reigate between 1892 and 1906. He later served as Lord Lieutenant of Surrey from 1905 to 1939, and was appointed to the Order of the Bath as a Companion (CB) in 1911.

Cubitt succeeded to the peerage upon the death of his father in 1917. He was appointed to be a Deputy Lieutenant of the County of Surrey in 1940.

Denbies, a large estate in Surrey, was included in his inheritance from his father. The payment of death duties and the upkeep of large estates during World War I resulted in large parts of the estate being auctioned on 19 September 1921.

He was appointed Honorary Colonel of the 4th Battalion, Queen's Royal Regiment (West Surrey) in the Territorial Army on 12 July 1922, and was awarded the Territorial Decoration (TD).

== Family ==
He married Maud Marianne Calvert, daughter of Colonel Archibald Motteux Calvert and Constance Maria Georgiana Peters, on 21 August 1890. They had six sons, three of whom were killed in World War I:

- Henry Archibald Cubitt (born 3 January 1892, died 15 September 1916)
- Alick George Cubitt (born 16 January 1894, died 24 November 1917)
- William Hugh Cubitt (born 30 May 1896, died 24 March 1918)
- Roland Calvert Cubitt, 3rd Baron Ashcombe (born 26 January 1899, died 28 October 1962), married Sonia, daughter of George Keppel and Alice Keppel
- Archibald Edward Cubitt (born 16 January 1901, died 13 February 1972) - married first Lady Irene Helen Pratt, and later Sibell Margaret Norman
- Charles Guy Cubitt (born 13 February 1903, died 1979) - married Rosamund Mary Edith Cholmeley

== Death and burial ==
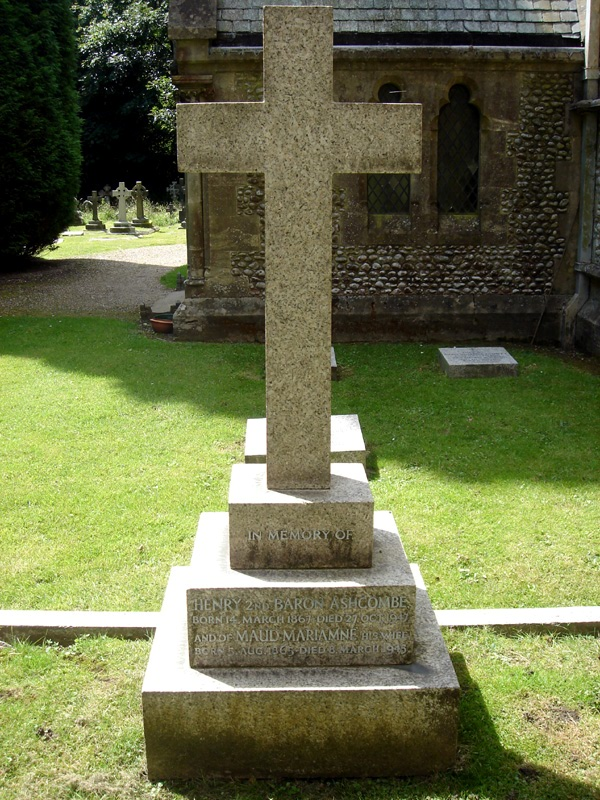
Henry Cubitt funerary monument, St Barnabas Church, Ranmore Common, Surrey

He died on 27 October 1947 and is buried in the churchyard of St Barnabas Church, Ranmore Common, Surrey.

Parliament of the United Kingdom
Preceded by James Lawrence	Member of Parliament for Reigate; 1892–1906	Succeeded by Harry Cunningham Brodie
Honorary titles
Preceded by The Viscount Midleton	Lord Lieutenant of Surrey; 1905–1939	Succeeded by Sir John Malcolm Fraser, Bt
Peerage of the United Kingdom
Preceded by George Cubitt	Baron Ashcombe; 1917–1947	Succeeded by Roland Cubitt
