= Eccles Establishment =

The Eccles Establishment was an Anglican mission to India in the 19th and 20th centuries.
