= Biwater =

UK business

Biwater International Limited provides large-scale water and wastewater treatment solutions. It has completed over 25,000 projects in over 90 countries, being headquartered in Surrey, England. Adrian White, CBE, founded Biwater in 1968, and is the Executive Chairman. White is also the founder of British Water, the United Kingdom's Water Trade Association.

== History ==
Biwater was established in 1968 as Biwater Treatment Company in Beckenham, Kent, UK, by Adrian White with an authorised share capital of £100. The name 'Biwater' was derived from the idea of working with 'two waters', the treatment of wastewater and the provision of clean drinking water.

In 1971, Biwater set up its global headquarters in Dorking, Surrey.

In the early 1970s, Biwater identified the need to develop scalable water and wastewater treatment plants.

After a number of acquisitions in 1986, Biwater developed a collective brand identity and launched the Biwater fish logo.

== Solutions ==
Biwater has designed and constructed water and wastewater treatment plants, provided consultancy services and run water systems for people in over 90 countries. Since starting in the United Kingdom in 1968, the company has completed many diverse projects, from a piped water supply to 4.2 million inhabitants in Malaysia, to constructing sewage treatment works for Abu Dhabi, to purchasing water companies in China.

== Locations ==
=== Americas ===
In the 1960s Biwater began working in the Americas, initially securing a number of equipment supply contracts. The company's first regional turnkey project was the ‘Northern Range Valleys Water Supply Scheme’ in Trinidad and Tobago. They constructed three treatment plants to provide drinking water to hillside communities.

The Group established a "Desalination and Membrane Treatment Centre of Excellence" (Biwater Inc.) in the United States following the acquisition of Advanced Environmental Water Treatment in 2005.

=== Middle East ===
Biwater have delivered a number of strategic turnkey projects across the Middle East, including the Abu Dhabi Sewage Treatment Build, Own, Operate, Transfer (BOOT) contract and Mafraq Wastewater Treatment Works in the United Emirates.

In Saudi Arabia, the Biwater's Buwayb Desalination Plant was the world's largest desalination plant at the time of commissioning. Another significant Biwater plant in the Kingdom was the Jeddah Water Reuse Facility, which was one of the first water reuse plants in the country.

=== Africa ===
Some of Biwater's earliest international contracts were secured in Africa in the 1960s, Over the years, he secured large turnkey design-build projects for capital cities, ongoing ownership and operation contracts, and extensive rural water supply schemes.

=== Asia Pacific ===
Biwater's flagship projects in the region include the Malaysian Rural Water Supply Scheme encompassing 134 individual water supply projects, Batam Island 230 MLD Water Supply Concession in Indonesia, Yen So Park 200 MLD Wastewater Treatment Plant in Vietnam, Changi 228 MLD NEWater Plant in Singapore and Stonecutters Island Sewage Treatment Works (HATS Stage 2A) with ultimate capacity of 2,400 MLD in Hong Kong.

== BBC Documentary ==
The BBC has produced a documentary piece about Biwater as part of a UK export series showcasing the best of British businesses operating globally. It discusses the insufficient amount of access to clean water around the world and how they are addressing this problem.
