= Adrian White (businessman) =

British businessperson (born 1942)

Sir Adrian White CBE DL
- Born: Adrian Edwin White; June 1942 (age 83)
- Occupation: Businessman
- Known for: Founder of Biwater

Sir Adrian Edwin White CBE DL (born June 1942) is the founder of the British engineering company Biwater.

In the 2015 Birthday Honours, White was knighted "for services to international trade and development". As of 2017, he is a Deputy Lieutenant of Surrey.
