= Alice Keppel =

English society figure and mistress of King Edward VII (1868–1947)

Alice Keppel The Honourable Mrs George Keppel
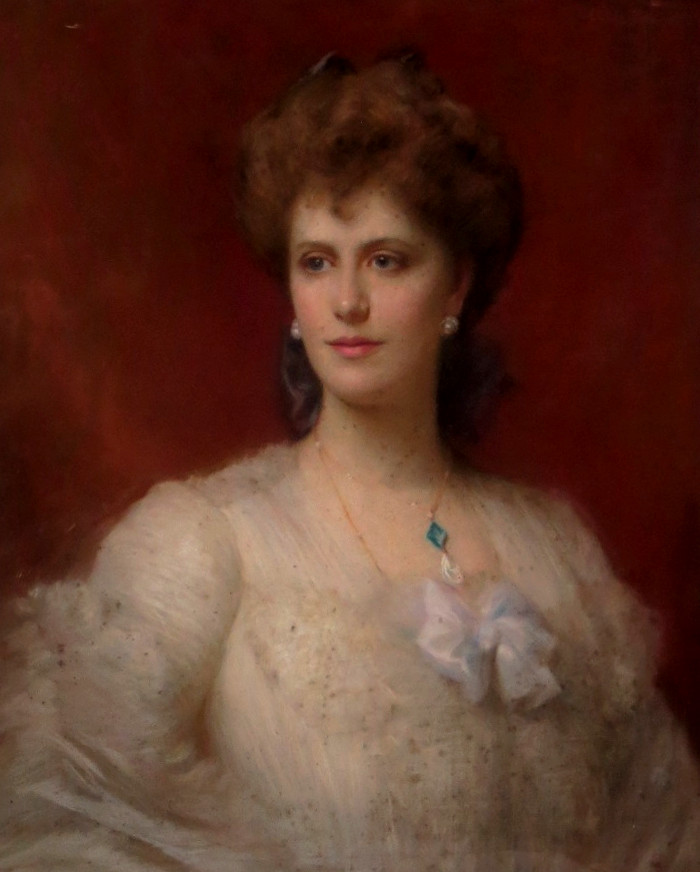
- Portrait of Alice Keppel, c. 1890s
- Born: Alice Frederica Edmonstone of Duntreath; 29 April 1868; Woolwich, Kent, England
- Died: 11 September 1947 (aged 79); Bellosguardo Florence, Italy
- Resting place: Cimitero degli Allori, Florence, Italy
- Known for: Mistress and confidante of King Edward VII; Great-grandmother of Queen Camilla
- Spouse: George Keppel (m. 1891)
- Children: Violet Trefusis; Sonia Cubitt
- Parent(s): Sir William Edmonstone, 4th Baronet of Duntreath; Mary Elizabeth Parsons

Alice Frederica Keppel (née Edmonstone; 29 April 1868 – 11 September 1947) was an aristocrat, British society hostess and a long-time mistress of King Edward VII.

Keppel grew up at Duntreath Castle, the family seat of the Edmonstone baronets in Scotland. She was the youngest child of Mary Elizabeth, née Parsons, and Sir William Edmonstone, 4th Baronet. In 1891 she married George Keppel, an army officer, and they had two daughters. Alice Keppel became one of the most prominent society hostesses of the Edwardian era. Her beauty, charm and discretion impressed London society and brought her to the attention of the future King Edward VII in 1898, when he was still Prince of Wales, and was his mistress until his death.

Through her younger daughter, Sonia Cubitt, Alice Keppel is the great-grandmother of Queen Camilla, the second wife of Edward VII's great-great-grandson King Charles III.

== Early life ==
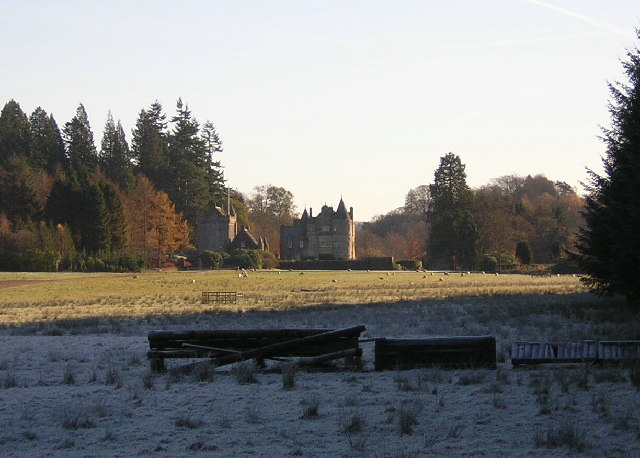
Duntreath Castle

Alice Frederica Edmonstone (known as "Freddie" to her family) was born on 29 April 1868 in Woolwich Dockyard, Kent, to Mary Elizabeth, née Parsons (1823–1902), and Sir William Edmonstone, 4th Baronet (1810–1888), who was serving as Superintendent at the Dockyard at the time. Besides his position as a baronet, her father was a retired admiral in the Royal Navy, and her maternal grandfather Lieut.-Col. John Whitehill Parsons (1786–1848) had been a governor of the Ionian Islands. Alice was the youngest of one brother and seven sisters, and while growing up she was closer to her brother Sir Archibald Edmonstone, 5th Baronet of Duntreath (Archie), than her sisters.

Alice grew up at Duntreath Castle, the home since the 14th century of the Edmonstone family, who were direct descendants of the Royal House of Stuart. The castle had been a wedding gift from King Robert III of Scotland to his daughter Mary Stewart, Princess of Scotland, when she married her fourth husband, Sir William Edmonstone of Culloden, in 1425.

== Marriage ==
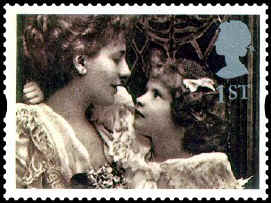
Alice Keppel with her daughter Violet in 1899, reproduced on a Royal Mail stamp issued in 1995.

On 1 June 1891, at the age of 23, she married the Honourable Lt Col George Keppel, son of the 7th Earl of Albemarle. He was four years older than Alice and was serving as a soldier in the British Army at the time of their marriage. The Keppel family had a history of service to the British monarchy as descendants of Arnold Joost van Keppel, who had accompanied King William III to Britain in 1688 and been granted the title Earl of Albemarle in 1696.

George and Alice Keppel had two daughters: Violet Trefusis (6 June 1894 – 29 February 1972) and Sonia Cubitt (24 May 1900 – 16 August 1986). Her husband's lack of money led Alice to engage in affairs with richer men in order to keep the family up with the lifestyle of London society of those times. She began her first affair with Ernest Beckett, 2nd Baron Grimthorpe, and members of the Keppel family believed that Beckett was the biological father of Keppel's daughter Violet. Alice also had an affair with Humphrey Sturt, 2nd Baron Alington.

Keppel's husband once said of her: "I do not mind what she does as long as she comes back to me in the end." Her affairs were conducted with his knowledge, and despite a deep affection for his wife, he also had affairs. "Very fond of women himself, he raised no objection to the prince's friendship with his wife", wrote the historian Christopher Hibbert. Despite affairs on both sides, one of her daughters described her parents' marriage as a "marriage of companionship of love and laughter".

== Society hostess ==
Keppel became one of the best-known society hostesses of the Edwardian era. She was described as being witty, kind and even-tempered. Her elder daughter Violet wrote that, "She not only had a gift of happiness but she excelled in making others happy, she resembled a Christmas tree laden with presents for everyone".

The British writer Sir Harold Acton described Keppel: "None could compete with her glamour as a hostess. She could have impersonated Britannia in a tableau vivant and done that lady credit." Keppel was the inspiration for the character "Mrs Romola Cheyne" in Vita Sackville-West's novel The Edwardians. She was hailed as one of the beauties of the "naughty nineties", described as having alabaster skin, large blue eyes, a small waist, chestnut hair and a large bust.

== Relationship with Edward VII ==
In 1898, the 29-year-old Keppel met Albert, Prince of Wales, the 56-year-old heir apparent to the British throne. Despite a 27-year age difference, she soon became Albert's mistress. Keppel lived at 30 Portman Square, where Albert regularly visited her; her husband conveniently left during the visits. Her relationship with Albert lasted through his ascension to the throne as King Edward VII in 1901 and until his death in 1910. Keppel was one of the few people in Edward VII's circle who was able to smooth his mood swings.

Edward's wife, Alexandra of Denmark, was fond of Keppel and tolerant of the liaison. She preferred Keppel to Edward's previous mistress, Daisy Greville, Countess of Warwick, whom she disliked for being indiscreet when she showed off her position. Millicent Leveson-Gower, Duchess of Sutherland, Lady Warwick's half sister, stated that the prince was "a much pleasanter child since he changed mistresses".

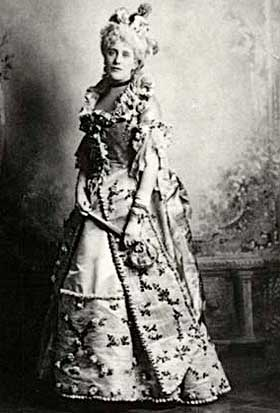
Costume ball at Warwick Castle in 1895

Through her royal association, Keppel became more affluent. The king permitted friends such as Sir Ernest Cassel to create endowments that kept her financially secure. Instead of giving her money directly from the Privy Purse, the king gave Keppel shares in a rubber company; these later gained her £50,000, the equivalent of around £7.5 million today. King Edward VII let his own bankers and financial advisers manage her businesses. He also secured a good job for her husband which paid a higher salary. According to Christopher Hibbert, "George cheerfully went to work for Sir Thomas Lipton, who obligingly found him employment at the prince's instigation." With her influence, Keppel also found her brother Archie (Sir Archibald Edmonstone, 5th Baronet of Duntreath) a place in the royal household: Archie was Groom in Waiting for the final three years of King Edward VII's reign. Keppel later took care of him and of his family.

=== Position at court ===
After Albert, Prince of Wales, became king as Edward VII in 1901, Keppel's discretion made her a perfect communicator between the king and his ministers. She knew how to present a topic to him so that he would listen, even if sometimes he disagreed. The Viceroy of India once said that "there were one or two occasions when the King was in disagreement with the Foreign Office, and I was able, through her, to advise the King with a view to the foreign policy of the government being accepted."

Keppel's influence was founded on her discretion, social finesse, and conversational skill. Her best known contribution to politics was her role as a Liberal hostess. In this role, she acted as a representative for Edward and noted Liberals and was able to help Edward's causes. What influence she had in politics is unknown, but it is stated the king listened to her and depended on her advice. Biographer Raymond Lamont-Brown states: "He completely trusted Alice and through her...he could make his political opinion known. A message to Alice was enough to get an arguable topic dropped into conversation to gauge effect, which was reported back to the King." British prime minister H. H. Asquith and his wife Margot once thanked her for her "wise counsel" in a letter. However, she disliked any mention of her political involvement with the king being made in public. In 1933, when Margot Asquith's memoir was published, she was annoyed that her name was mentioned as the king's political advisor.

Though Alice Keppel was known for her persuasiveness, her efforts to encourage the king to abandon his smoking and heavy eating were unsuccessful. Concerned about the king's health, she wrote a letter to the Portuguese Minister Marquis de Soveral, shortly after Edward fell ill: "I want you to try and get the King to see proper doctor about his knee....do what you can with your famous tact and of course don't tell anyone I wrote to you." Her letter, although read, was not acted upon.

=== The King's death ===
King Edward's death in 1910 made Keppel so grief-stricken that at his deathbed she had to be escorted out of his room by members of the Royal Household. Embarrassed by her behaviour, she later tried to minimise her dramatic outburst, but eventually admitted that she had been unable to control herself.

== Later life ==
In November 1910, the Keppels left Britain. Keppel stated it was because of her children's education, but it may also have been because of the King's death which had made her life change. The family spent two years travelling in Eastern Asia and Sri Lanka. In 1910, the King had bought a new house for the Keppels at 16 Grosvenor Street, in London. During the First World War, Keppel helped her friend Lady Sarah Wilson run a hospital for wounded soldiers in Boulogne.

In 1925, Keppel and her husband moved to Italy, buying the palazzo of Villa dell' Ombrellino in Bellosguardo in Florence. The villa had been the home of the scientist Galileo, the poet Foscolo and the scholar C. E. Norton. Keppel commissioned the architect Cecil Pinsent to lay out the villa terrace with bisecting paths, which she named a 'Union Jack garden'; and after her death her daughter Violet maintained the villa and its garden. Keppel and her husband hosted social gatherings at the villa which attracted prominent people in society; among them the exiled King and Queen of Greece, the King and Queen of Yugoslavia, the exiled Queen of Spain, Alice's relatives Major Walter Basil Louis Bonn and Lt. Col. Colin Keppel Davidson, and the future British prime minister Sir Winston Churchill. During her early time in Italy in the 1920s, her daughters Violet and Sonia sometimes remained in the UK, as by then they were both married. Keppel and her husband returned to the UK in 1940 following the onset of World War II.

On 11 December 1936, when Edward VII's grandson, Edward VIII, abdicated the throne to marry Wallis Simpson, Keppel, while dining at the Ritz Hotel, was heard to say, "Things were done much better in my day."

=== Death ===
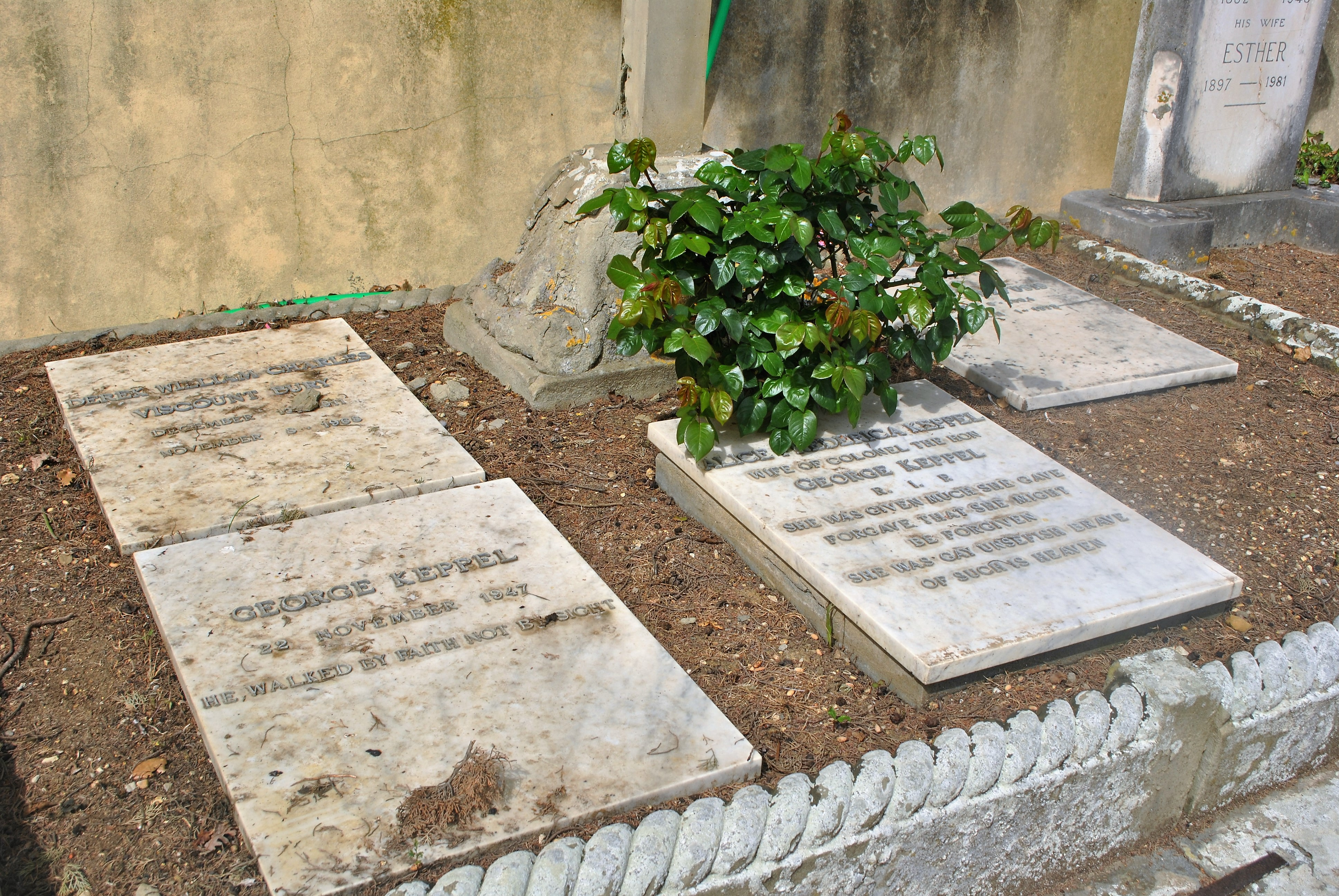
The graves of Alice and George Keppel at Cimitero Evangelico degli Allori

In 1946, the Keppels returned to their palazzo in Italy, and a year later, on 11 September 1947, Alice died of cirrhosis of the liver. Her husband George died two and a half months later, in his permanent suite kept at the Ritz Hotel. It was said that he could not live without her, having been married for 56 years. They are both buried in the Cimitero Evangelico degli Allori in Florence. They also have commemorative plaques in St Mark's English Church, Florence.

== See also ==
- English royal mistress
