= George Keppel (British Army officer, born 1865) =

British Army officer (1865–1947)

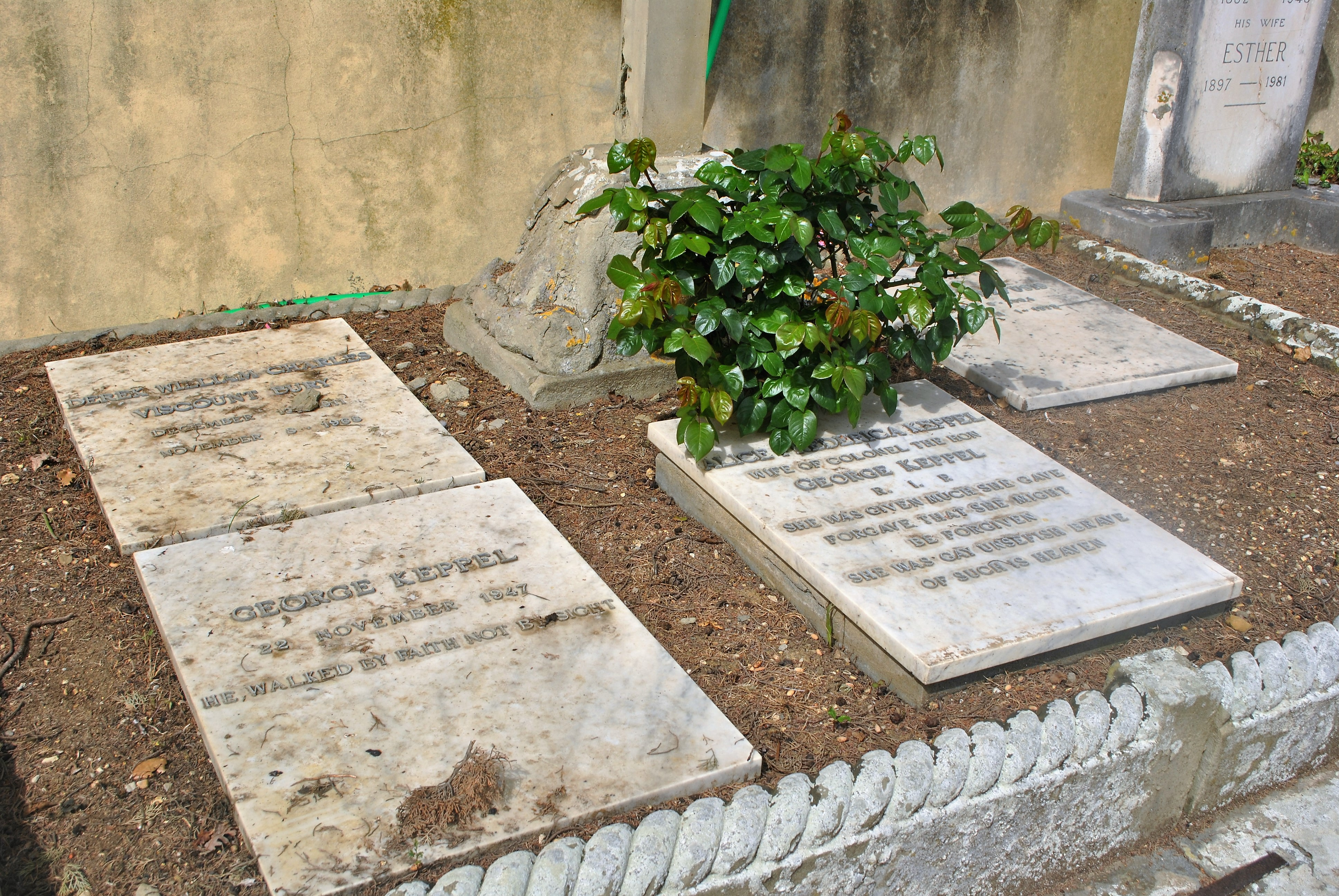
Cimitero degli Allori, The Hon. George Keppel and Alice Keppel

The Honourable George Keppel MVO (14 October 1865 – 22 November 1947) was a British army officer and the husband of Alice Keppel, the mistress of King Edward VII. Keppel was a descendant of King Charles II, and was also the great-grandfather of Queen Camilla.

== Biography ==
Keppel was the third son of William Keppel, 7th Earl of Albemarle, treasurer of Queen Victoria's household, and his wife, Sophia Mary, Countess of Albemarle (d. 5 April 1917), daughter of Sir Allan Napier MacNab, speaker of the Canadian Parliament. He graduated from the Royal Military College, Sandhurst, in January 1886. Soon after, he joined the Gordon Highlanders as a lieutenant. He resigned his commission in 1892, but joined the Norfolk Artillery Militia in 1894. Keppel was promoted to captain in 1908 and was appointed MVO a year later after being attached to the king during the latter's visit to the city of Norwich that year.

On 1 June 1891, Keppel married Alice Frederica Edmonstone, the youngest daughter of Mary Elizabeth, née Parsons (1823–1902), and Admiral Sir William Edmonstone, 4th Baronet (1810–1888). Together they had two daughters, Violet (1894–1972) and Sonia (1900–1986). In 1898, Keppel's wife became a mistress and confidante to Edward, Prince of Wales. Her relationship with Edward lasted through his accession to the throne as King Edward VII in 1901, and until his death in May 1910. Keppel knew of the affair and would leave their house on Portman Square when King Edward VII visited his wife.

Through his daughter Sonia, Keppel is the great-grandfather of Queen Camilla, who was four months old when Keppel died on 22 November 1947, in his suite at the Ritz Hotel, in London.
