= Ghislaine Alexander =

British socialite & heiress (1922-2000)

- Born: Ghislaine Marie-Rose Edith Dresselhuys; 7 January 1922; Dutch consulate in London
- Died: 25 April 2000 (aged 78)
- Occupations: Heiress and socialite
- Known for: Panelist on the British version of What's My Line?
- Spouses: Denis Alexander, 6th Earl of Caledon (m. 1943; div. 1948) Henry Cubitt, 4th Baron Ashcombe (m. 1955; div. 1968) Adrian Foley, 8th Baron Foley (m. 1972)
- Children: Lady Tana Focke

Ghislaine Marie-Rose Edith Alexander (née Dresselhuys; 7 January 1922 – 25 April 2000) was a wealthy heiress and British socialite who was a panelist on the British version of What's My Line?.

== Life and times ==
Alexander was the only daughter of Cornelius William Dresselhuys and Edith Merandon du Plessis, born at the Dutch consulate in London, where her father was consul. Her parents divorced when Ghislaine was young, and her mother married newspaper publisher Lord Kemsley, who became Alexander's stepfather. She was married three times, first to Major Denis Alexander, 6th Earl of Caledon, then to Henry Cubitt, 4th Baron Ashcombe; both marriages ended in divorce. At the time of her death she was married to Adrian Foley, 8th Baron Foley, a former composer and pianist.

Ghislaine Alexander became famous for her appearances as a panelist on Britain's What's My Line? television quiz show. She had been a fashion journalist and had modelled for women's magazines such as Vogue and Women's Illustrated.

A caricature of her appeared briefly in Disney's 1961 release of 101 Dalmatians.

In October 2009, two dresses worn by Alexander, one in 1934, the other in 1938, were purchased by the Bath Fashion Museum in Bath, Somerset, England, for £101,365.

=== American connections ===
Alexander had close connections to the United States. She spent much of her youth in Palm Beach, Florida, where her parents, Lord and Lady Kemsley, had a home. Then, as Lady Foley she resided in Beverly Hills. Alexander was a regular visitor to New York. On 10 January 1954, she appeared on the American version of What's My Line?, first as a mystery guest, then joining the panel for the second round. Her arrival for the show was reported in Ed Sullivan's newspaper column.
