= Henry Cubitt, 4th Baron Ashcombe =

British aristocrat, uncle of Queen Camilla (1924-2013)

The Right Honourable The Lord Ashcombe
- Coat of arms of Cubitt, Baron Ashcombe: Chequy Or and Gules on a pile Argent, a lion's head erased Sable

Member of the House of Lords
- Lord Temporal
- In office 28 October 1962 – 11 November 1999 as a hereditary peer
- Preceded by: The 3rd Baron Ashcombe
- Succeeded by: Seat abolished (Note: Pursuant to the House of Lords Act 1999.)

Personal details
- Born: Henry Edward Cubitt; 31 March 1924 Marylebone, London, England
- Died: 4 December 2013 (aged 89)
- Party: Conservative
- Spouses: Ghislaine Alexander (m. 1955; div. 1968) Virginia Carington (m. 1973; div. 1979) Mary Elizabeth Dent-Brocklehurst (m. 1979)
- Parent(s): Roland Cubitt, 3rd Baron Ashcombe; Sonia Rosemary Keppel

Henry Edward Cubitt, 4th Baron Ashcombe (31 March 1924 – 4 December 2013), was a British hereditary peer. He was the son of Roland Cubitt, 3rd Baron Ashcombe, and Sonia Rosemary Keppel, and the uncle and godfather of Queen Camilla.

== Education and career ==
Educated at Eton College, he served in the Royal Air Force during the Second World War. After the War he became chairman of Holland, Hannen & Cubitts, the family construction firm. He was the London-based Consul-General for Monaco from 1961 to 1968.

== Family ==
He was married three times without issue:

- Ghislaine (née Dresselhuys), Countess of Caledon (ex-wife of the 6th Earl of Caledon), was married to Lord Ashcombe from 1955 to 1968. In 1972, she married Adrian Foley, 8th Baron Foley.
- Virginia Carington (daughter of Peter Carington, 6th Baron Carrington) was married to Lord Ashcombe from 1973 to 1979. She later became a special aide to the Prince of Wales and the Duchess of Cornwall.
- Mary Elizabeth Dent-Brocklehurst (née Chipps), the mother of two children from her previous marriage to the late Mark Dent-Brocklehurst, married Lord Ashcombe in 1979 at Sudeley Castle, which she partially owns with her children. The medieval fortress, situated in the Cotswolds, is her home.

Lord Ashcombe's first cousin once removed, Mark Cubitt, born in 1964, is now the 5th Baron Ashcombe.

== Sources ==
- The Peerage: Henry Edward Cubitt, 4th Baron Ashcombe

Peerage of the United Kingdom
Preceded by Roland Cubitt	Baron Ashcombe; 1962–2013; Member of the House of Lords (1962–1999)	Succeeded by Mark Cubitt
