= Ranmore Common =

Wooded area in Surrey, England

Coordinates: 51.239°N 0.387°W

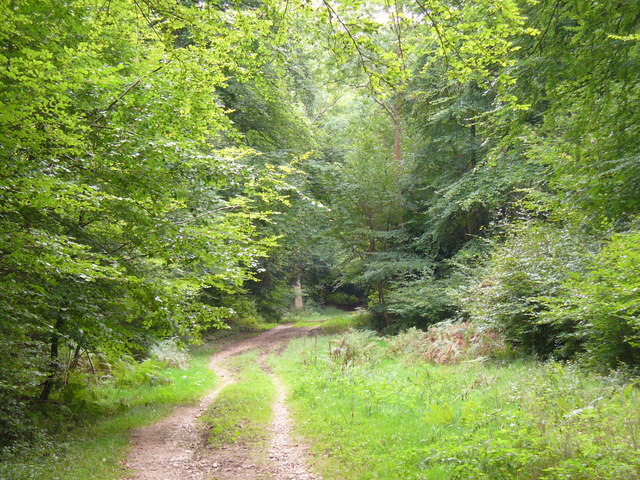
Ranmore Common bridleway

Ranmore Common, also known as Ranmore Commons, is an area of wooded former common land on the North Downs, immediately northwest of Dorking in the English county of Surrey. Its civil parish is Wotton, a geographically large village with a small population west of Dorking. Ranmore Common is within the Surrey Hills Area of Outstanding Natural Beauty, and part of it is Ranmore Common SSSI, a Site of Special Scientific Interest.

== Features ==
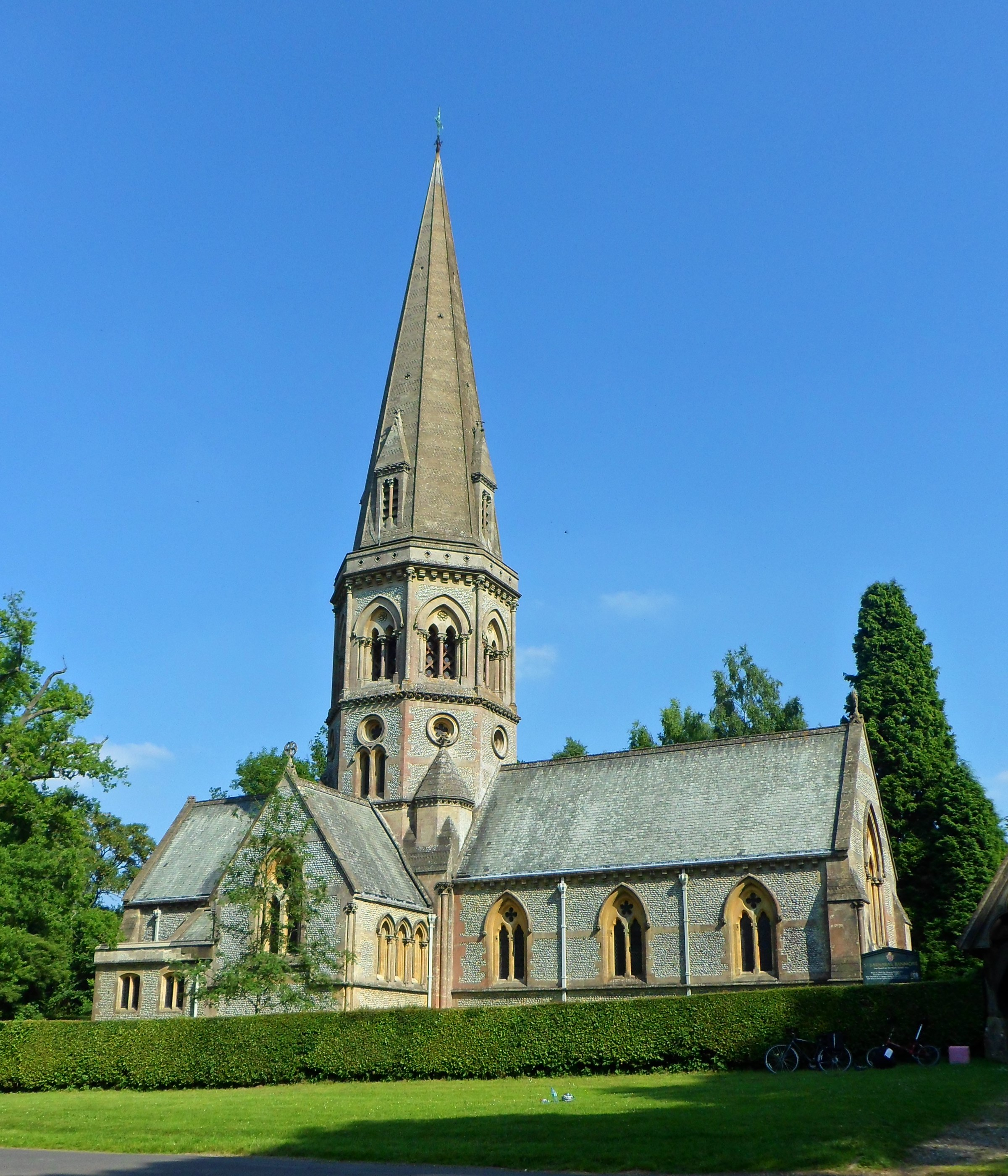
The Church on the North Downs Way: St Barnabas', Ranmore Common

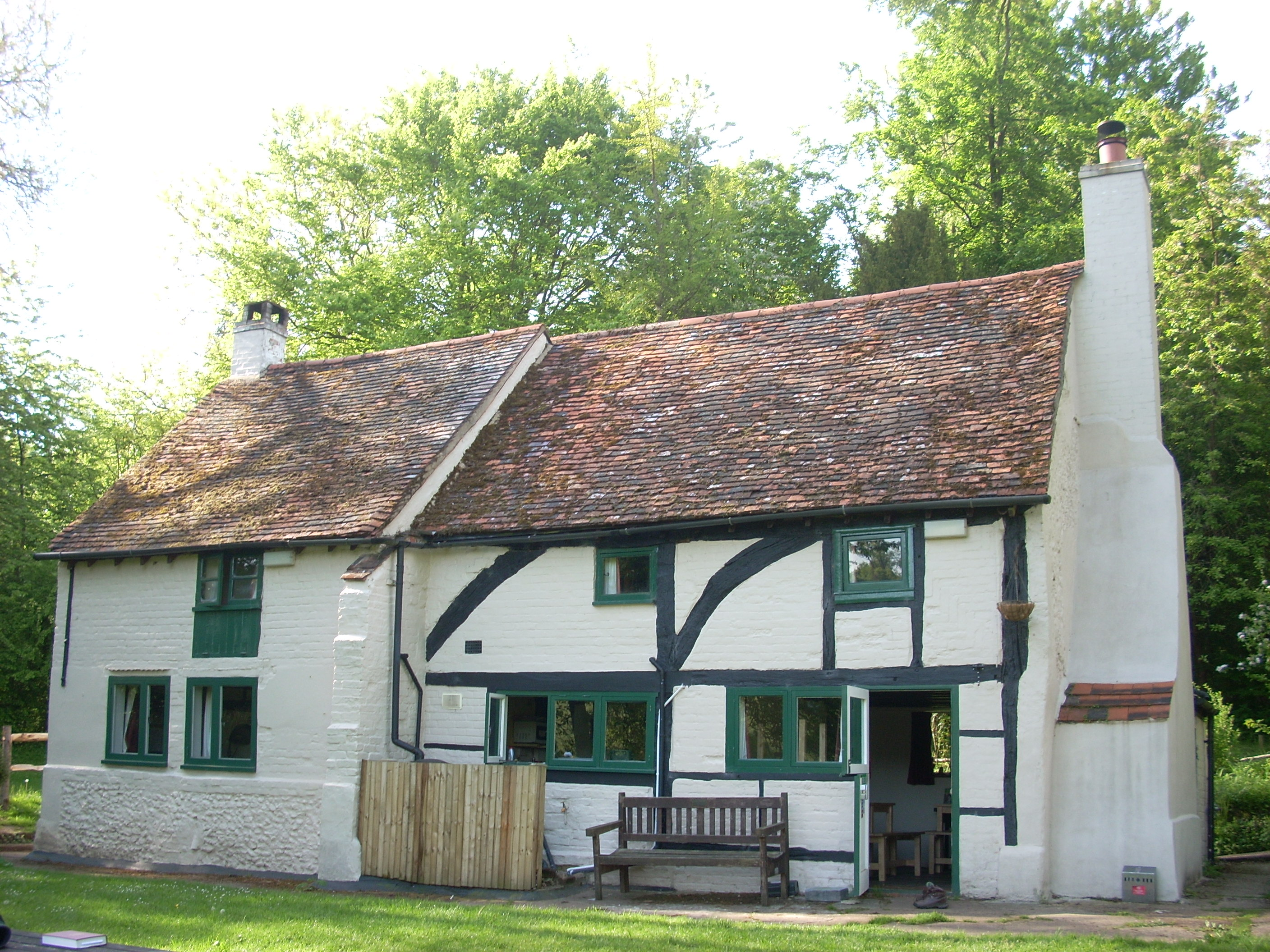
Tanners Hatch Youth Hostel

George Cubitt, owner and resident of the estate abutting to the east, Denbies, commissioned George Gilbert Scott to design St Barnabas Church, which was completed in 1859. The church is designated with a Grade II* listing; Cubitt is buried to the east of the chancel. It has several other notable burials including Sir Harry Hylton-Foster, who died in 1965.

The north and south sides are wooded and sloped. Its central belt is a road separating a very long, natural grass and wildflower meadow. On its northern edge are Tanners Hatch Youth Hostel which is a Grade II listed building, and further, across a wooded vale, Polesden Lacey.

The North Downs Way National Trail, a long-distance path that runs from Farnham to Dover, via Canterbury, crosses the common.

For fifty years the route of the Tanners Hatch Marathon, a thirty-mile challenge walk, crossed the common. It began in 1960, and was so-called because the first few marathons started and finished at Tanners Hatch Youth Hostel.
