= Parker Bowles =

Parker Bowles or Parker-Bowles is an English surname. Notable people with the name include:

- Ann Parker Bowles (1918–1987), British aristocrat and Girl Guides leader
- Andrew Parker Bowles (born 1939), British Army officer, son of Ann
- Camilla Parker Bowles (born 1947), ex-wife of Andrew and current Queen consort of England
- Laura Parker Bowles (born 1978), British art curator, daughter of Camilla and Andrew
- Tom Parker Bowles (born 1974), British food writer and food critic, son of Camilla and Andrew
