= Laura Lopes =

British art curator (born 1978)

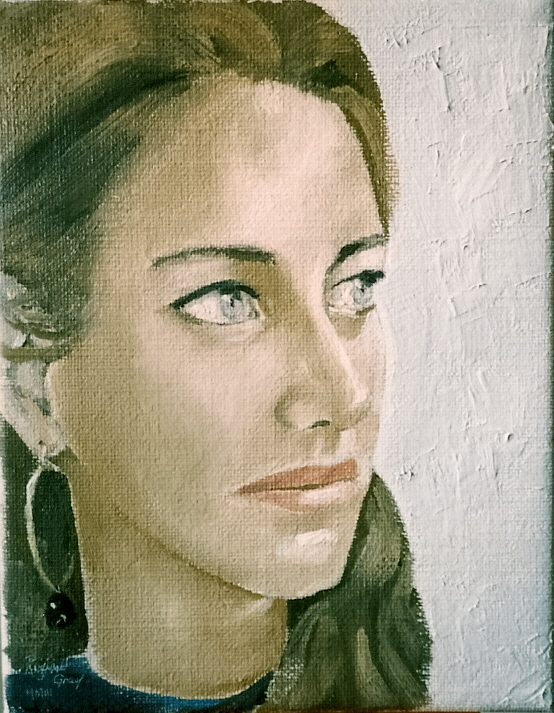
- Portrait by Reginald Gray, 2005
- Born: Laura Rose Parker Bowles; 19 April 1978 (age 48); Swindon, Wiltshire, England
- Occupation: Art curator
- Spouse: Harry Lopes (m. 2006)
- Children: 3
- Parents: Andrew Parker Bowles; Camilla Shand
- Relatives: Tom Parker Bowles (brother)

Laura Rose Lopes (née Parker Bowles; born 19 April 1978) is an English art curator. She is the daughter of Andrew Parker Bowles and Queen Camilla, making her the stepdaughter of King Charles III.

== Biography ==
=== Early life ===
Laura Parker Bowles was born on 19 April 1978, the second child of army officer Andrew Parker Bowles and Camilla Shand. She and her older brother Tom were raised as Catholics. Their father is Catholic, as was their paternal grandmother. Her paternal grandparents were Derek Henry Parker Bowles of Donnington Castle House in Berkshire, who was a great-grandson of Thomas Parker, 6th Earl of Macclesfield, and his wife Ann (née de Trafford), daughter of multimillionaire racehorse owner Sir Humphrey de Trafford, 4th Baronet and granddaughter of Henry Cadogan, Viscount Chelsea (heir apparent of 5th Earl Cadogan). Her maternal grandparents were Major Bruce Shand, a British Army officer turned businessman, and The Honourable Rosalind Cubitt, daughter of the 3rd Baron Ashcombe and Sonia Rosemary Keppel, daughter of Alice Keppel. Fiona Petty-Fitzmaurice, Marchioness of Lansdowne, is her godmother.

She grew up at Bolehyde Manor in Allington, and later Middlewick House in Corsham, both in Wiltshire.

Lopes was educated at St Mary's Shaftesbury, a Catholic girls boarding school in Dorset. In the 1980s, she and her brother attended Heywood Preparatory School in Corsham. She later attended Oxford Brookes University, where she studied History of Art and Marketing.

=== Career ===
In 2001, Lopes spent three months as an intern at the Peggy Guggenheim Collection in Venice. She was Tatler's motoring correspondent in 2001 while her brother Tom was a food columnist at the same magazine. Lopes managed The Space Gallery in London's Belgravia area in the mid-2000s, and in October 2005 became a co-founding partner and gallery director of London's Eleven gallery. She also recommends art events to her mother.

From 2015 to 2023, she was the co-founding owner of the fashion boutique Mojo & McCoy in Hungerford.

=== Marriage and children ===
Since her mother's wedding to Charles III (then Prince Charles) in 2005, she has been Charles' stepdaughter and the stepsister of William, Prince of Wales and Prince Harry, Duke of Sussex.

On 6 May 2006, she married chartered accountant Harry Marcus George Lopes, son of the Hon. George Lopes and his wife, the Hon. Sarah Astor. Harry's paternal grandparents are Massey Lopes, 2nd Baron Roborough and Helen Dawson, while his maternal grandparents are Gavin Astor, 2nd Baron Astor of Hever and Lady Irene Haig. Thus, making her a cousin-in-law to Massey Lopes, 4th Baron Roborough.

The wedding took place at St Cyriac's Church, an 11th-century Anglican church in Lacock, Wiltshire. Lopes wore a wedding dress by Anna Valentine, the designer known for designing her mother's dress for her wedding to the Prince of Wales in 2005. 380 guests attended the wedding, and around 500 well-wishers lined the streets after the ceremony. The reception was held at Ray Mill House, the nearby home of the bride's mother.

Lopes gave birth to a daughter in 2008, and to fraternal twin sons in 2009.

Her daughter Eliza was a bridesmaid at the wedding of Prince William and Catherine Middleton on 29 April 2011.

Her sons Gus and Louis were Pages of Honour to their grandmother at her coronation.
