= Tom Parker Bowles =

British food writer and critic (born 1974)

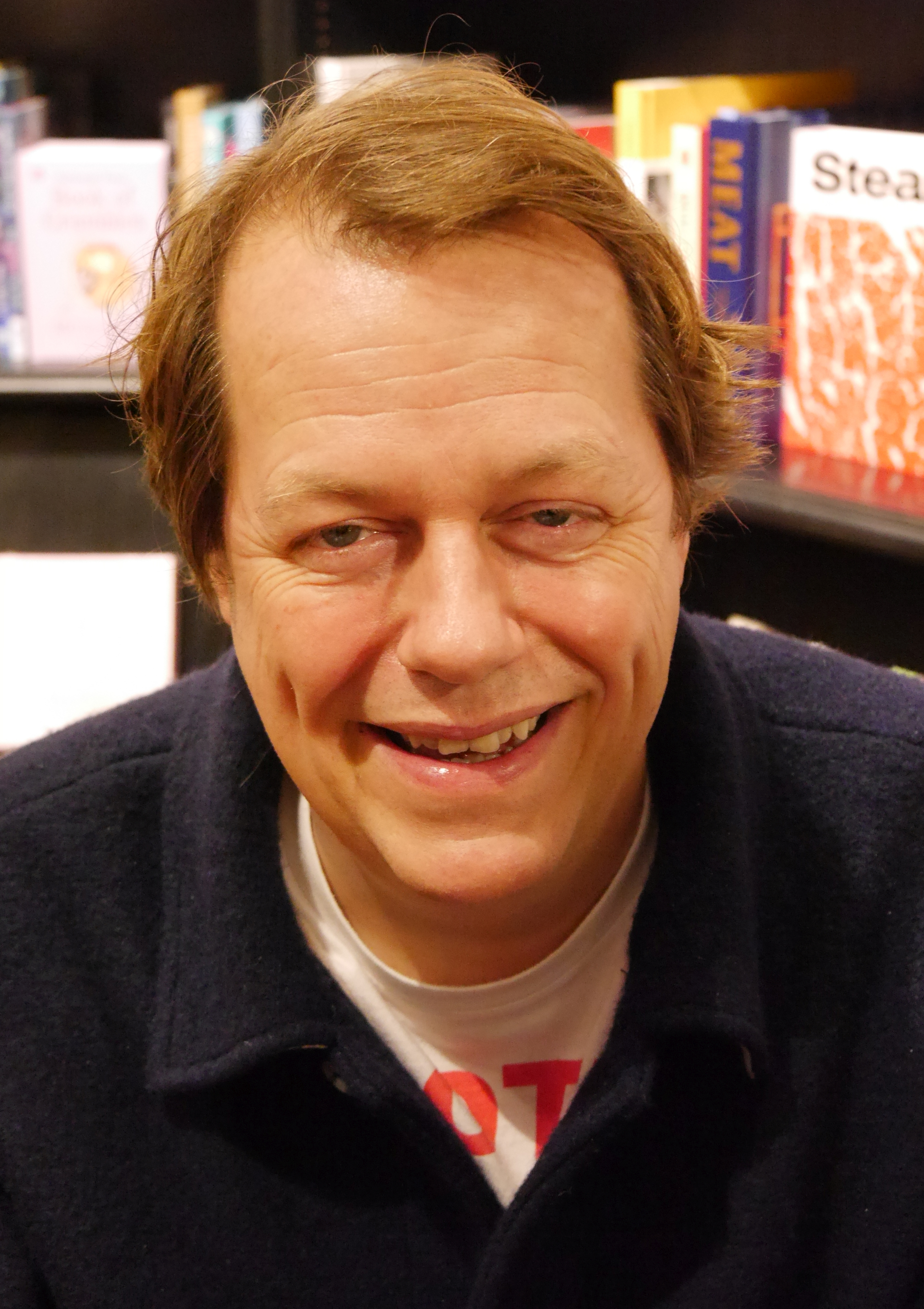
- Parker Bowles in 2024
- Born: Thomas Henry Charles Parker Bowles; 18 December 1974 (age 51); Westminster, London, England
- Occupations: Food writer, food critic
- Spouse: Sara Buys (m. 2005; div. 2022)
- Children: 2
- Parents: Andrew Parker Bowles; Camilla Shand
- Relatives: Laura Lopes (sister); Charles III (stepfather)

Thomas Henry Charles Parker Bowles (born 18 December 1974) is a British food writer and food critic. Parker Bowles is the author of nine cookery books and, in 2010, won the Guild of Food Writers 2010 award for his writings on British food. He is known for his appearances as a judge in numerous television food series and for his reviews of restaurant meals around the UK and overseas for GQ, Esquire, and The Mail on Sunday.

Parker Bowles is the son of Queen Camilla and Andrew Parker Bowles. His stepfather and godfather is King Charles III.

== Early life and education ==
Tom Parker Bowles was born on 18 December 1974 in London. He grew up in Wiltshire at Bolehyde Manor in Allington, near Chippenham, and later at Middlewick House, near Corsham. He and his sister Laura were raised as Catholics. Both his father and paternal grandmother were Catholic. His paternal grandparents were Derek Henry Parker Bowles of Donnington Castle House in Berkshire, who was a great-grandson of Thomas Parker, 6th Earl of Macclesfield, and his wife Ann (née de Trafford), daughter of multimillionaire racehorse owner Sir Humphrey de Trafford, 4th Baronet. His maternal grandparents were Major Bruce Shand and The Honourable Rosalind Cubitt, daughter of the 3rd Baron Ashcombe and Sonia Rosemary Keppel. Like his father, he is in distant remainder to the Earldom of Macclesfield.

Parker Bowles was educated at Summer Fields School in Oxford. In the 1980s, he and his sister attended Heywood Preparatory School in Corsham. He later attended Eton College and Worcester College, Oxford. Parker Bowles states that immediately after leaving school, he fell in love with food writing, and cites his mother's cooking skills and recipes as his inspiration.

== Career ==
From 1997 until 2000, Parker Bowles was a junior publicist for Dennis Davidson Associates, a public relations firm. In 1999 there were newspaper reports that he took cocaine at the Cannes Film Festival. In 2001, he became Tatler's food columnist.

Since 2002 he has been a food writer, critic and broadcaster. He is a restaurant critic of The Mail on Sunday and food editor of Esquire. He is also a contributing editor to Condé Nast Traveller (UK and US), and Departures (US), as well as a regular contributor to Country Life, Harper's Bazaar and Town & Country. He was a contributor to Gordon Ramsay's food magazine television series The F Word.

From 2007 to 2010 he co-presented Market Kitchen on Good Food Channel, alongside Matthew Fort and Matt Tebbutt, and presented LBC Radio's Food and Drink Programme for a year. He was a judge on the ITV Food series Food Glorious Food and Channel 9 Australian cooking series The Hotplate. In 2017, he was judge, alongside Matt Moran and Anna Polyviou, on Series 1 of Family Food Fight (Channel 9 Australia) and filmed series two of Family Food Fight, which was broadcast in late 2018. He is also one of the regular critics on MasterChef (BBC 1). In 2014, Parker Bowles was named as one of the Top 10 most followed UK restaurant critics on Twitter.

=== Cookery books ===
Parker Bowles's first book, published in 2004, was E Is For Eating – An Alphabet of Greed. His next, The Year of Eating Dangerously: A Global Adventure in Search of Culinary Extremes, was published by Ebury in 2007. AbeBooks named the book as one of The 50 Best Food Memoirs. His third, Full English: A Journey Through the British and Their Food was published in 2009 and won the Guild of Food Writers 2010 award for best work on British food. His next book, Let's Eat: Recipes From My Kitchen Notebook, is a compendium of his favourite recipes from his childhood, collected from around the world, and written with the amateur cook in mind. The book was published by St. Martin's Press and was released in 2012.

In October 2014, he launched his fifth book titled Let's Eat Meat: Recipes for Prime Cuts, Cheap Bits and Glorious Scraps of Meat, which was published by Pavilion. His seventh book, Fortnum and Mason – Christmas and Other Winter Feasts (4th Estate) was released in October 2018. Cooking and the Crown: Royal Recipes from Queen Victoria to King Charles III was released in October 2024.

=== Business ventures ===
In November 2011, Parker Bowles, along with food writer Matthew Fort and farmer Rupert Ponsonby, launched a pork scratchings snack named Mr. Trotter's Great British Pork Crackling. Following good reviews and satisfactory sales of the snack, they launched a beer brand in 2013 named Mr Trotter's Chestnut Ale, which was produced in partnership with The Lancaster Brewing Company and is considered to be the first chestnut beer made in the UK.

== Personal life ==
On 10 September 2005, after five years of dating, Parker Bowles married Sara Buys, an associate editor of Harpers & Queen magazine and senior editor of British Town & Country magazine. The wedding took place at St. Nicholas' Anglican Church in Rotherfield Greys, Oxfordshire. His cousin Ben Elliot was his best man. The couple had daughter Lola in 2007 and son Frederick in 2010. Parker Bowles and Buys separated in 2018 and their divorce was finalised in 2022.

In 2019, Parker Bowles started dating former journalist Alice Procope (née Horton), the granddaughter of the 2nd Viscount Ingleby and estranged wife of Robert Procope, grandson of Sir Robert Wigram, 8th Baronet. On 17 March 2021, Procope died in her home, seven months after being diagnosed with cancer.

On 6 May 2023, his son Freddy Parker Bowles was one of the Pages of Honour to Queen Camilla at her coronation.

== Publications ==
- E is for Eating: An Alphabet of Greed. (2004). Long Barn Books. ISBN 978-1902421100
- The Year of Eating Dangerously: A Global Adventure in Search of Culinary Extremes (2007). Ebury. ISBN 978-0091904913
- Full English: A Journey Through the British and Their Food. (2009). Ebury. ISBN 978-0091926687
- Let's Eat: Recipes from My Kitchen Notebook. (2012). St. Martin's Press. ISBN 978-1250014337
- Let's Eat Meat: Recipes for Prime Cuts, Cheap Bits and Glorious Scraps of Meat. (2014). Pavilion. ISBN 978-1909108318
- The Cook Book: Fortnum & Mason. (2016). Harper Collins. ISBN 978-0008199364
- Fortnum and Mason: Christmas and Other Winter Feasts. (2018). Fourth Estate Ltd ISBN 978-0008305017
- Fortnum & Mason: Time for Tea. (2021). Fourth Estate Ltd ISBN 978-0008387105
- Cooking and the Crown: Royal recipes from Queen Victoria to King Charles III. (2024). Aster ISBN 978-1783256068
