= The Brigadier (painting) =

2004 painting by Lucian Freud

- Artist: Lucian Freud
- Year: 2004
- Medium: Oil on canvas
- Subject: Andrew Parker Bowles
- Dimensions: 223,5 cm × 138,4 cm (880 in × 545 in)
- Location: Private collection

The Brigadier is a 2004 oil on canvas painting by the British artist Lucian Freud (1922–2011). It is a larger than life seven foot high portrait of Andrew Parker Bowles. In 2015 the work sold at auction at Christie's in New York City for $34.89 million.

== History ==
The painter and the sitter first met in 1983 when Freud phoned Parker Bowles, then the commanding officer of the Household Cavalry Mounted Regiment, to request some horses to be life models for paintings he planned to create. The two men became friends and years later Freud decided that it was time to paint Parker Bowles himself.

For the painting the artist and sitter visited, viewed, and discussed James Tissot's Portrait of Frederick Burnaby (1870) which is displayed at the National Portrait Gallery in London, and agreed upon it as a point of departure for the new work. Subsequently, Parker Bowles returned to the Knightsbridge barracks to reclaim his old military uniform from when he served as commanding officer of the Household Cavalry Mounted Regiment, then as colonel commanding the Household Cavalry and Silver Stick in Waiting to Queen Elizabeth II, and then as brigadier director of the Royal Army Veterinary Corps; and redonned it. Therein the retired military officer found he had become a bit more portly since. Upon hearing this Freud said "no matter" because the painting would only be head and shoulders, but the result was full length.

Parker-Bowles has himself offered that he had the opportunity to purchase the work, but did not have "three or four million to spare". Instead it was first acquired by the American investment banker Damon Mezzacappa. The painting was then put up for auction following the wealthy Floridian's death in April 2015. Mezzacappa lent the painting to the Norton Museum of Art in West Palm Beach, Florida, for their 2013 exhibition of the artist's later work, "Lucian Freud: Paintings and Prints". However, the portrait was only shown for the month of May as the "Masterpiece of the Month" in a show that ran until September 2013.

== Reaction ==
Mark Stevens, in his review for New York Magazine of the exhibition "Lucian Freud: Recent Paintings" at Acquavella Galleries in New York City, at which the work premiered to the public, wrote: "In The Brigadier, Freud has painted a florid English military man in full regalia, medals ablaze on his chest. The stripping of the soldier is therefore particularly subtle. The uniform's brilliant surface accentuates the subject's hands and fleshy face. His eyes look inward, as if caught hiding behind his uniform, even as his stomach billows out from his loosened jacket. One hand clasps the chair while the other is raised, as if he were suspended inside a question. The angles of the composition are exquisitely poised without being too tight, and are marvelously suggestive. The long, loose rectangular strip floating upward behind the brigadier's upraised hand not only controls the visual space but could almost be a dream of a baton or a riding crop. The luscious red stripe, so evocative of Manet, defines painterly panache".

Tom Parker Bowles told the Evening Standard "Freud captures something about my father that is not possible to describe, something closer to his essence, his soul. It goes beyond the merely representational and ends up being a complete portrait in every way" and the Irish Times that "Even if the sitter were not my father, I'd still be struck by the beauty, quiet majesty and sheer technical brilliance of this picture".
