= Ray Mill House =

Country house in Wiltshire, England

- Location in Wiltshire
- 51.4234°N 2.1137°W
- Location: Reybridge, Wiltshire England
- OS grid reference: ST 9219 6938

History
- Built: c. 1860

Site notes
- Architectural style: Italianate

Listed Building – Grade II
- Designated: 7 January 1987
- Reference no.: 1198630

Ray Mill House is a 19th-century country house in Reybridge, a hamlet near Lacock, Wiltshire, England. It is privately owned by Queen Camilla.

== History ==
Ray Mill House was constructed around 1860. In 1987 it was listed Grade II on the National Heritage List for England by English Heritage.

In 1996, Camilla Parker Bowles bought the house for £850,000 (equivalent to £1,706,000 in 2025) following her divorce from Andrew Parker Bowles. The Earl of Halifax established a trust fund for Camilla to help her with the purchase of the house following her divorce. Camilla had lost £400,000 as one of the 'Names' of Lloyd's of London in the mid 1990s. She retained ownership of the house after she moved into Clarence House with Charles, the then-Prince of Wales, in 2003. She hosted her daughter Laura's wedding reception at the house in 2006. Camilla has retained ownership of the house since becoming queen upon her husband's accession in 2022. In 2025, Charles III bought the property next to Ray Mill House, known as the Old Mill, for £3 million with his private funds, to preserve Camilla's privacy and prevent the building from being turned into a wedding venue.

== Gardens ==
The house has twelve acres (five hectares) of gardens. Charles III helped oversee the design of the gardens following Camilla's purchase of the house. Honey from beehives in the garden, along with bees from Highgrove House, is sold at Fortnum & Mason with the proceeds going to charity. The gardens were featured in the July 2022 edition of Country Life to celebrate Camilla's 75th birthday.

== Design ==
Ray Mill House is largely of 19th-century Italianate construction with later 20th-century Neo-Georgian additions. English Heritage describes the building as "Two storeys, asymmetric Italianate style with gables treated as open pediments. [...] North and south sides and west end have similar gables with tripartite ground floor window, broad band supporting paired angle pilasters up to pediment angles, tripartite first floor windows and pediment lunette. [...] Paired stone piers to porch and C20 neo-Georgian hood. [...] East end service range altered on south side in neo-Georgian style." It has six bedrooms.

Robert Kime assisted Camilla with the interior design of the house, and described it as having "family stuff" and Italian furniture from Camilla's great aunt Violet Trefusis. The drawing room of the house has a portrait of Alice Keppel, Camilla's great-grandmother. The house has a swimming pool. Charles III advised Camilla to not heat the pool during the winter months to save energy; this eventually resulted in thousands of pounds of damage to pipes that had frozen.
