= Portrait of Frederick Burnaby =

Painting by James Tissot

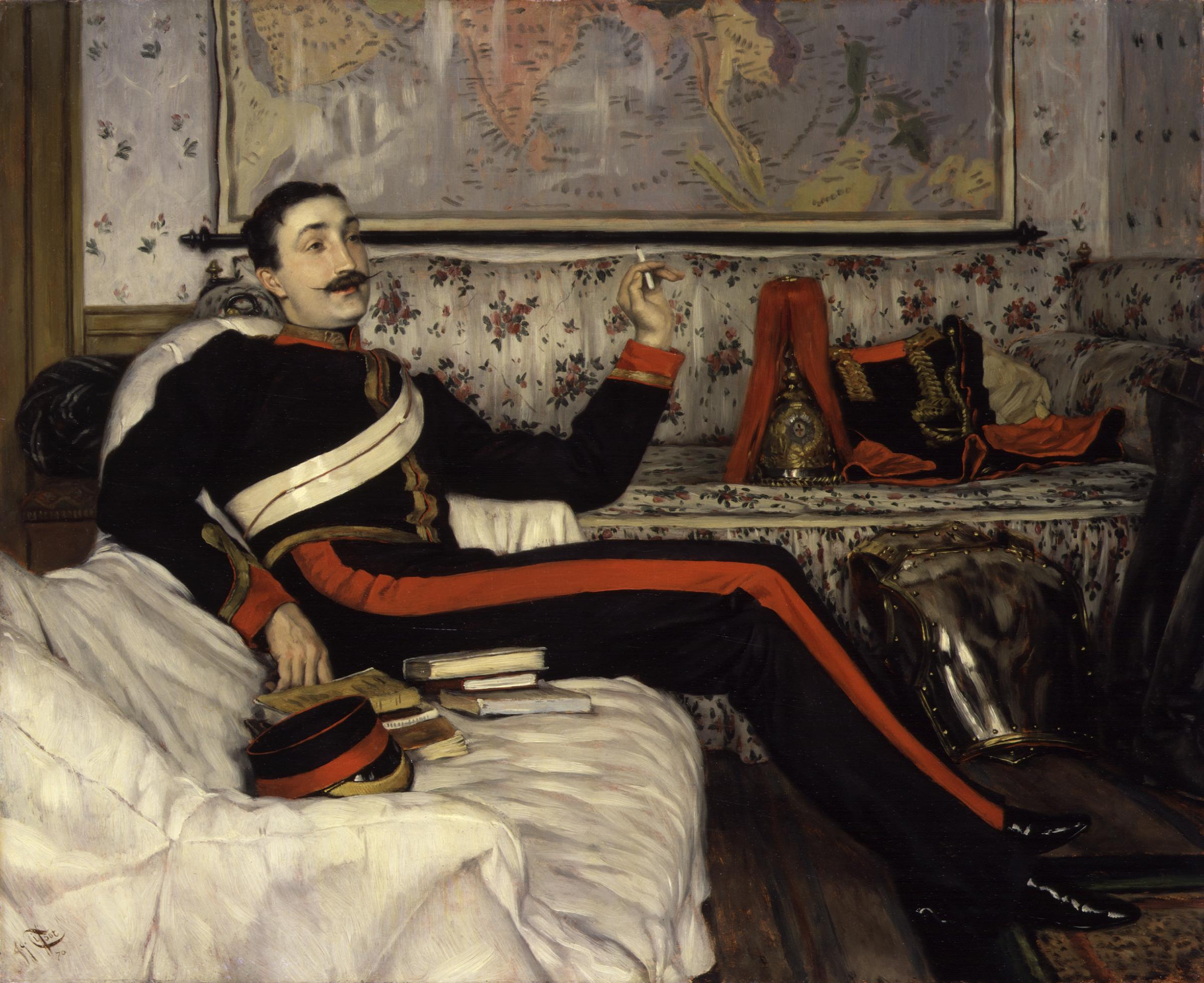
- Artist: James Tissot
- Year: 1870
- Type: Oil on panel, portrait painting
- Dimensions: 50 cm × 61 cm (20 in × 24 in)
- Location: National Portrait Gallery, London

Portrait of Frederick Burnaby is an oil on panel portrait painting by the French artist James Tissot from 1870. It depicts the British army officer and celebrity Frederick Burnaby.

== History and description ==
Burnaby became famous for his physical strength and his participation in hot air balloon experiments. He is shown in the uniform of a captain of the Royal Horse Guards, while smoking a cigarette and apparently chatting friendly. He has some books and his cap at his left. In the background, we can see a map of Asia displayed in the wall. There is military equipment in the sofa below the map and in the floor. He was later killed in action at the Battle of Abu Klea in 1885 during the Gordon Relief Expedition.

After moving to London, Tissot became best-known for his genre paintings showing scenes of ordinary life. However, this portrait was commissioned by the politician and magazine publisher Thomas Gibson Bowles, a friend of Burnaby. It was displayed at the International Exhibition held at South Kensington in 1872.

The painting is now in the collection of the National Portrait Gallery, in London, having been acquired in 1933.

== Cultural references ==
The painting was the inspiration for the portrait The Brigadier (2003-2004), by Lucian Freud, where he depicts his friend Andrew Parker Bowles, in a pose inspired by Burnaby.

== Bibliography ==
- Gaunt, William. The Restless Century: Painting in Britain, 1800-1900. Phaidon, 1972.
- Marshall, Nancy Rose & Warner, Malcolm. James Tissot: Victorian Life, Modern Love. Yale University Press, 1999.
