= Chippenham Without =

Civil parish in Wiltshire, England

Coordinates: 51.47°N 2.16°W

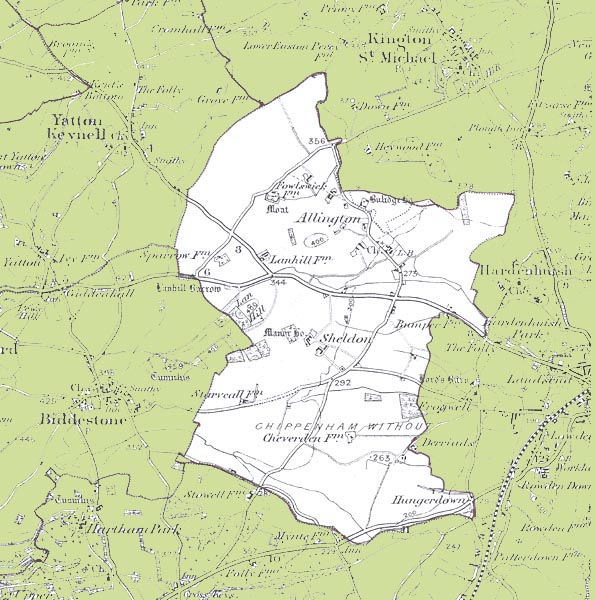
1896 Ordnance Survey map of Chippenham Without; modern boundary superimposed

Chippenham Without is a civil parish in Wiltshire, England, created as a separate entity from the parish of Chippenham by the Local Government Act 1894 and largely consisting of farmland to the west of Chippenham, towards Biddestone. Of note within it are the ancient settlements of Allington and Sheldon, the latter with its manor house. The population taken at the 2011 census was 208.

== History ==
There is evidence of occupation of the area over a 5,000 year period, with the most recent historical remains being medieval.

When created in 1894, the parish covered (as it does today) land to the west of Chippenham, and an area of comparable size east of the town, stretching south from Tytherton Lucas through Stanley to the area now known as Pewsham. By 1901, the parish contained 394 houses.

The parish was reduced in size in 1914, when the built-up area (584 acres, population 1,961 in 1921) in the south-west of Chippenham was transferred to Chippenham Within; at the same time 70 acres of farmland were transferred to Lacock parish. A further reduction took place in 1934, when the whole eastern area (2,378 acres, population 260 in 1931) was transferred to Pewsham parish. In 2009, following westward expansion of Chippenham, the A350 western bypass became the boundary with Chippenham Without.

=== Allington ===
Allington hamlet, west of Chippenham and just north of the A420 road towards Bristol, has always been part of Chippenham Without. Nearby, Bolehyde Manor is a Grade II* listed 17th-century manor house.

=== Fowlswick ===
A farm, formerly a manor held by Malmesbury Abbey. A substantial moated mansion was replaced by Fowleswick Farmhouse in the 17th century.

=== Sheldon ===
The site of a deserted medieval village, the principal remains of which are the Grade I listed Sheldon Manor, which dates to the 14th century; the adjacent small private chapel was built around 1450. Sheldon School, a secondary school in Chippenham, takes its name from here.

== Governance ==
The parish elects a parish council. It is in the area of Wiltshire Council unitary authority, which is responsible for all significant local government functions. The parish is part of Kington electoral division, which also covers several rural parishes north of Chippenham, and elects one Wiltshire councillor.

The parish falls within the UK Parliament constituency of South Cotswolds.
