= St Mary's School, Shaftesbury =

St Mary's School

Location
- Shaftesbury, Wiltshire, SP7 9LP; England; 51.006°N 2.165°W

Information
- Type: Private day and boarding school
- Motto: Ad Maiorem Dei Gloriam; To the Greater Glory of God
- Religious affiliation: Roman Catholic
- Established: 1945
- Founder: Institute of the Blessed Virgin Mary
- Closed: 2020
- Local authority: Dorset
- Ofsted: Reports
- Chair of governors: V Younghusband
- Head teacher: Maria Young
- Gender: Girls
- Age: 9 to 18
- Colour: Green
- Publication: The Beech Tree
- Diocese: Plymouth
- Website: http://www.stmarys.eu/

St Mary's School was a private Roman Catholic day and boarding school for girls, founded in 1945 in a rural setting near Shaftesbury, England. The school had a sixth form and was a member of the Girls' Schools Association. After operating at a loss for some time, the school closed in July 2020.

Although the school's postal address was in Dorset, its site lay just over the county border in Wiltshire, within the parish of Donhead St Mary.

== History ==
The entrance of the school, as viewed from the drive

St Mary's was founded in 1945 by the nuns of the Institute of the Blessed Virgin Mary (also known as the Sisters of Loreto) whose principles are based on the life and works of Mary Ward. Hence it had the same motto as its sister schools in Ascot and Cambridge.

The school became a registered charity in 1995. It was managed by a board of governors, but retained its strong Catholic ethos.

In 2018, the charity had an income of £4.7 million. This was £866,000 less than its expenses, which included £943,000 in bursaries and scholarships that were granted to 96 pupils.

== Pastoral care ==
As a Catholic school, pupils attended mass and worship services on a regular basis, and spirituality was considered an important part of school life. The houses took turns to lead services, giving pupils a chance to participate in the service themselves. Spiritual retreats were held by year groups throughout the year.

There were three main houses which were named after places where Mary Ward had lived: Newby, Harewell and York.

The school's pastoral care was commended in the 2007 ISI inspection.

== Boarding ==
Over half of the school's pupils were boarders, all of them full-time and organised by year groups into five boarding houses.

- St Jude: Years 5 to 8
- St Edith: Years 9 and 10
- St Thomas More: Years 11 and 12
- Mary Ward: Year 13

== Academic achievement ==
St Mary's was one of the top performing independent schools in the county. It was one of the few schools in the county which did not suffer from the new GCSE grading system using the English Baccalaureate introduced in 2010, as candidates achieved a 100% pass rate.

== Closure ==
After operating at a loss for some years, the school entered administration in mid-July 2020 and was immediately closed. The school's governors wrote that the effects of the COVID-19 pandemic had "wiped away" recent financial progress.

Despite lying in Wiltshire, the site was purchased for £10.05 million in January 2021 by Dorset Council, which described it as "suitable for a broad range of services and community uses, which could include provision for Dorset children, supported living for our Dorset care leavers, provision for adults with disabilities, as well as a possible site for businesses to boost our local economy and more besides".

== Notable former pupils ==
- Laura Lopes
- Lady Flora McDonnell
- Anna Chancellor
- Martha Fiennes
- Sophie Kinsella
- Sarah Bradford
- Constance Marten
