= Ann Parker Bowles =

British aristocrat and Girl Guides leader (1918–1987)

Dame Ann Parker Bowles DCVO CBE
- Born: Ann de Trafford; 14 July 1918; Marylebone, London, England
- Died: 22 January 1987 (aged 68); Highclere, Berkshire, England
- Occupations: Girl Guides leader, aristocrat
- Spouse: Derek Henry Parker Bowles (m. 1939; died 1977)
- Children: 4; including Andrew
- Parent: Sir Humphrey de Trafford, 4th Baronet
- Relatives: Tom Parker-Bowles (grandson); Laura Lopes (granddaughter); Derek Paravicini (grandson)

Dame Ann Parker Bowles DCVO CBE (née de Trafford; 14 July 1918 – 22 January 1987) was a British aristocrat and Girl Guides leader.

== Background ==
Ann de Trafford was born in 1918 at 29, Portland Place, London, the eldest daughter of millionaire racehorse owner Sir Humphrey de Trafford, 4th Baronet, and the Hon. Cynthia Hilda Evelyn Cadogan, a daughter of Henry Cadogan, Viscount Chelsea. The de Trafford Baronets descend from a pre-Conquest-founded recusant line of lords of the manor who were wealthy in the Middle Ages and restored to hereditary title in the mid-19th century. Ann (later Dame Ann) continued to adhere to the religion of her family, Catholicism.

== Honours ==
Ann Parker-Bowles was a Commissioner of the Commonwealth Girl Guides Association. For these and other services to the Commonwealth she was invested as Commander of the Order of the British Empire (CBE) in the 1972 New Year Honours, and, five years later, as a Dame Commander of the Royal Victorian Order (DCVO) in the 1977 New Year Honours.

== Marriage and children ==
On 14 February 1939 in Kensington, London, she married Derek Henry Parker Bowles (born Derek Henry Parker; 18 December 1915 – 4 February 1977), son of Eustace Parker Bowles (born Eustace Parker) and Wilma Mary Garnault Bowles, only daughter of Sir Henry Ferryman Bowles, 1st Baronet. They had four children:

- Brigadier Andrew Henry Parker Bowles (b. 27 December 1939)
- Simon Humphrey Parker Bowles (b. 6 November 1941)
- Mary Ann Parker Bowles (b. 9 June 1945)
- Richard Eustace Parker Bowles (b. 7 November 1947 – d. 29 November 2010)

Her eldest son Andrew was the first husband of Queen Camilla of the United Kingdom.
