= Sarah Bradford =

English author

- Born: Sarah Mary Hayes; 3 September 1938 (age 88); Bournemouth, Dorset, England
- Other name: Sarah Mary Malet Bradford
- Education: St Mary's School, Shaftesbury, University of Oxford
- Occupation: author
- Known for: royal biographies
- Spouses: Anthony Bradford (divorced) William Maxwell David Ward (m. 1976)
- Father: Brigadier Hilary Anthony Hayes OBE

Sarah Mary Malet Bradford, Viscountess Bangor (née Hayes; born 3 September 1938) is an English author who is best known for her royal biographies.

== Early life and education ==
Bradford was born in Bournemouth in 1938, the daughter of Brigadier Hilary Anthony Hayes DSO OBE. She was educated at St Mary's School, Shaftesbury, Dorset. She won a State scholarship to Lady Margaret Hall, University of Oxford, but met Anthony Bradford, a real estate developer, at Oxford, and abandoned her degree to marry him. The couple lived in Barbados, Lisbon, and Sardinia; they had two children, but divorced.

Sarah Bradford then worked for the manuscript department of the auctioneer Christie's in London, where she met her second husband, William Maxwell David Ward, Viscount Bangor; the two married in 1976.

== Writing career ==
Her first book, The Englishman's Wine, was written while she lived in Portugal. She has published more than a dozen books. Her husband became 8th Viscount Bangor in 1993. The couple live in London. Bradford was interviewed in connection with the 1994 edition of the PBS video The Windsors: A Royal Family, with the 2007 BBC documentary Gladstone and Disraeli, and assisted with screenwriting for The Borgias, a 2011 television series. In 2012, she was working on a biography of Queen Victoria.

=== Biographies ===
- Cesare Borgia (1976)
- The Borgias (with John Prebble) (1981)
- Disraeli (1982)
- Princess Grace (1984)
- George VI, Weidenfeld and Nicolson, London, 1989, ISBN 0-297-79667-4
- The Reluctant King (American version of George VI)
- Sacheverell Sitwell. Splendours and Miseries (1993)
- Elizabeth: A Biography of Britain's Queen (1996); according to WorldCat, the book is in over 1760 libraries
- America's Queen: The Life of Jacqueline Kennedy Onassis (2000); according to WorldCat, the book is in over 1650 libraries
- Lucrezia Borgia: Life, Love and Death in Renaissance Italy, Viking, 2004, ISBN 0-670-03353-7
- Diana, Penguin Group, London, 2006, ISBN 978-0-670-91678-8; according to WorldCat, the book is in over 890 libraries
- Queen Elizabeth II: Her Life in Our Times, Penguin, London, 2011, ISBN 978-0-670-91911-6

=== Other books ===
- The Englishman's Wine: The Story of Port (1969)
- Portugal and Madeira (1969)
- Portugal (1973)
