= Allington, North Wiltshire =

Hamlet in Wiltshire, England

Coordinates: 51.475°N 2.153°W

Allington
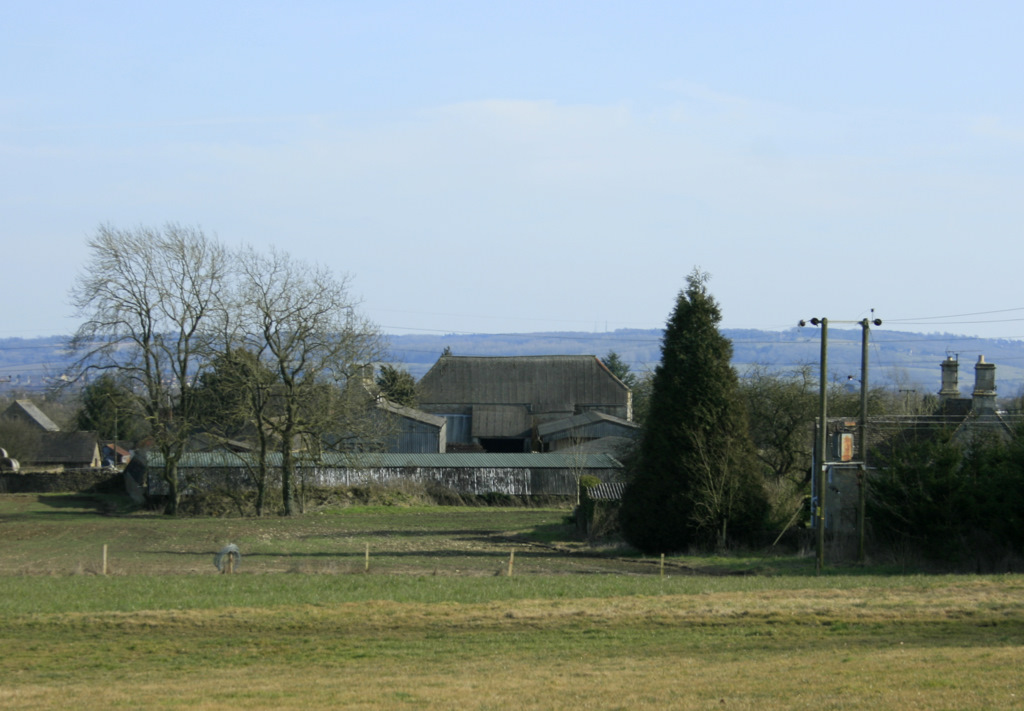
- Manor Farm, Allington

- Location within Wiltshire
- OS grid reference: ST895751
- Civil parish: Chippenham Without
- Unitary authority: Wiltshire
- Ceremonial county: Wiltshire
- Region: South West
- Country: England
- Sovereign state: United Kingdom
- Post town: Chippenham
- Postcode district: SN14
- Dialling code: 01249
- Police: Wiltshire
- Fire: Dorset and Wiltshire
- Ambulance: South Western
- UK Parliament: South Cotswolds

Allington is a hamlet in north Wiltshire, England. It is on the edge of the market town of Chippenham, about 2 miles (3 km) north-west of the town centre and about 0.3 miles (500 m) north of the A420 road towards Bristol.

Allington Bar is a farm and small hamlet on the A420.

Allington Manor Farmhouse is from the mid 18th century and incorporates fragments of a 17th-century manor house; further fragments are within an 18th-century barn. Bolehyde Manor, a Grade II* listed 17th-century manor house and former home of Queen Camilla, is a short distance north of Allington village.

This Allington is not a former parish, but was a tithing of the parish of Chippenham. Since 1894 it has been in the civil parish of Chippenham Without.

The settlement was designated as a conservation area in 1998, and in 2002 the area was extended to include the surrounding landscape.
