= Middlewick House =

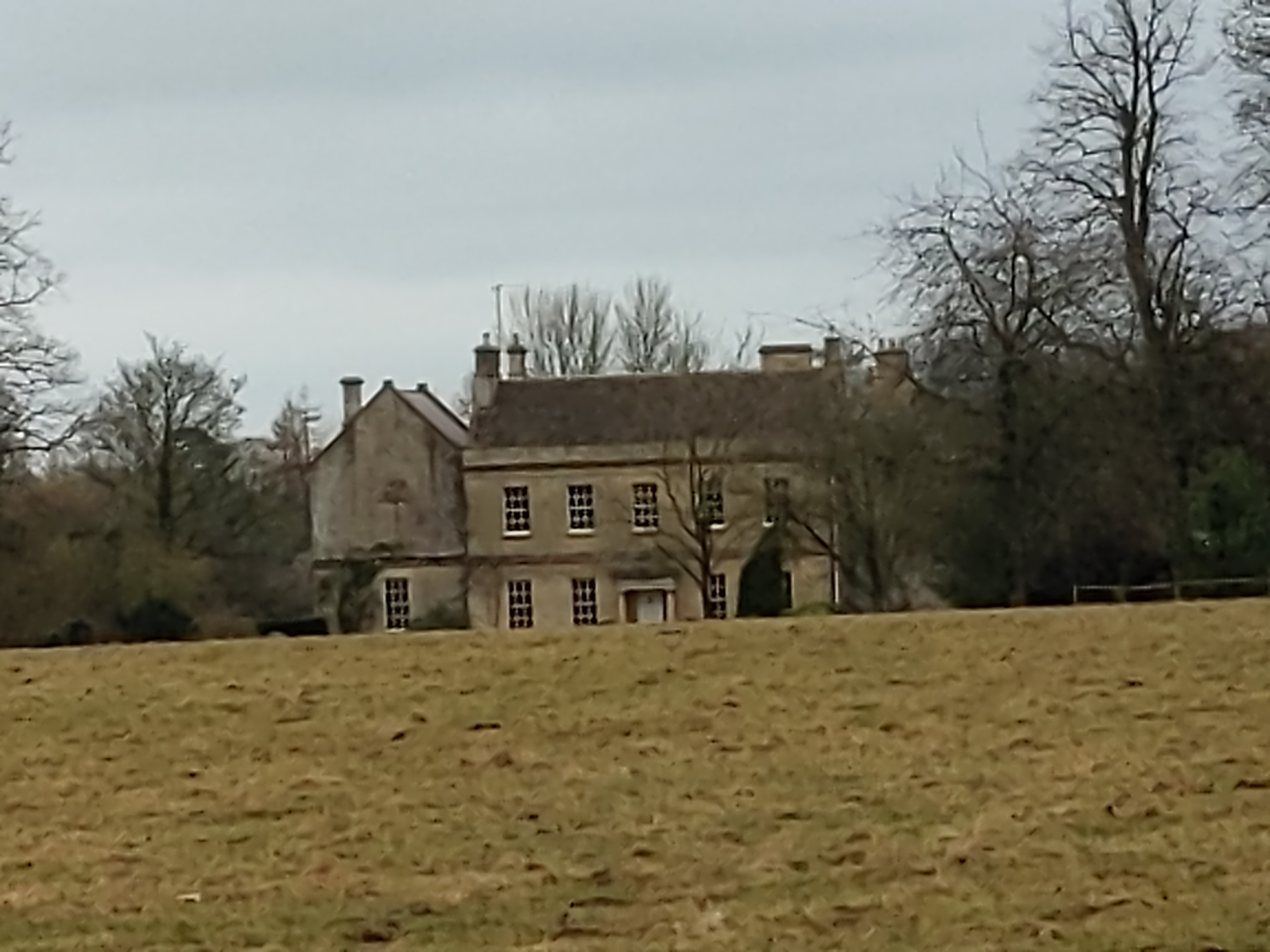
- Middlewick House in March 2022
- Interactive map of the Middlewick House area
- Former names: Middle Pickwick House

General information
- Type: House
- Architectural style: Georgian
- Location: Middlewick, Corsham, United Kingdom
- Coordinates: 51.4397°N 2.2035°W
- Construction started: circa 18th century
- Owner: Nick and Nettie Mason

Design and construction
- Designations: Grade II listed

Listed Building – Grade II
- Designated: 1 August 1986
- Reference no.: 1198192

Middlewick House is a Grade II listed Georgian-style house just outside the town of Corsham, Wiltshire, England. It is the home of the Pink Floyd drummer Nick Mason and his wife Nettie, who acquired it from previous owners Andrew and Camilla Parker Bowles – later Queen Camilla – in 1995.

The seven-bedroom building, which has been modified and expanded several times during its existence, was granted listed status, protecting it from unauthorised development, in August 1986. The front range is in ashlar, using Cotswold stone, with a roof of stone tiles, and dates from the 18th century. The west wing is earlier. Until the late 1900s the house was known as Middle Pickwick House.

Other past occupants of the house include the Reverend David Jardine, a dissenting minister, in the late 1700s; and Daniel Hugh Clutterbuck, in the late 19th century. The Clutterbucks were followed by Charlotte Hedworth Williamson, and in turn her son Brigadier Hudleston Noel Hedworth Williamson MC, DSO (died 1971) whose family were resident until the start of World War II. During that war, the house was a billet for intelligence personnel. Following the war, the house was occupied by descendants of Lieutenant Colonel Arthur Carleton Nicholson of Hartham Park (died 1945) and his wife, Agnes Susan Elizabeth (née Dumaresq), who were followed by the Hon David Edward Hely Hutchinson (died 1984) and his wife Barbara Mary (née Wyld), then in turn the Parker Bowles, in the 1980s.

The Masons occasionally open the gardens to visitors, to raise money for charity. The gardens, which have a number of works by the sculptor Simon Gudgeon, were featured in the 2017 book The Secret Gardeners by Victoria Summerley and photographer Hugo Rittson Thomas.
