= Bolehyde Manor =

Manor house in Wiltshire, England

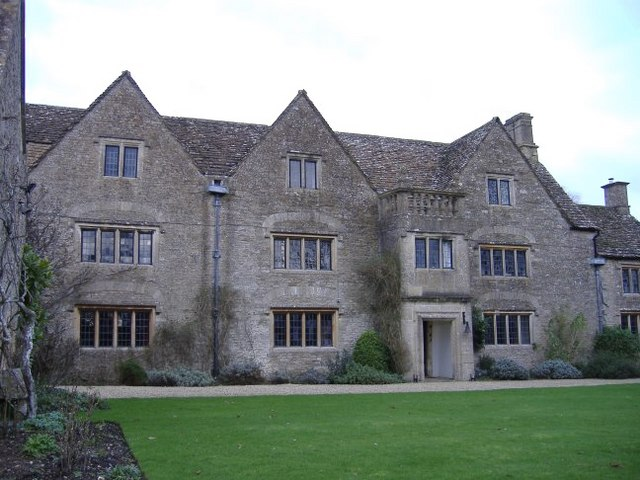
- Frontage of the house

- Location in Wiltshire
- 51.4795°N 2.1561°W
- Location: Allington, North Wiltshire, England
- OS grid reference: ST 893 756

History
- Built: Mid 17th century

Site notes
- Architectural style: Georgian

Listed Building – Grade II*
- Designated: 1 June 1952
- Reference no.: 1283450

Bolehyde Manor is a 17th-century manor house at Allington, north-west of Chippenham, in Wiltshire, England. It is a Grade II* listed building within the Allington conservation area of Chippenham Without parish. Camilla Parker Bowles (later Queen Camilla) lived at the house between 1973 and 1986, during her first marriage.

== History ==
The house takes its name from Thomas de Bolehyde, a 14th-century landowner. It is said to have been built with money embezzled from the monks, and had been in the possession of Glastonbury Abbey. It came into the possession of the Snell family of Kington St. Michael in the 16th century, and was sold by Sir Charles Snell to John Gale (or Cole) in 1635. He was a merchant of Bristol, but from a local Allington family. It remained in the Gale family until the late 19th century, and was usually called Bullhyde or Bullhydes.

Francis Kilvert, diarist, noted on 4 March 1875: "Old William [Halliday] told me the story of how old Squire Sadler Gale of Bulwich House at Allington made himself wings and flew off the garden wall. "Watch I vlee" he cried to the people. Then he dashed down into the horsepond".

The house was extensively restored for H Philip du Cros, later 2nd Bart. and his wife, Dita, in 1928. The building work was undertaken by Axford & Smith, Widcombe Joinery Works, Bath. A new garden layout was proposed at the same time, to the design of Norman Wilkinson of Strawberry House, Chiswick, London; it is not known if this was the artist Norman Wilkinson.

Between 1957 and 1967 the house and farm were in the hands of David and Diana Tylden-Wright, who changed the spelling of the name to "Bullidge House", reflecting the traditional pronunciation. After they sold it, the new owner restored the previous spelling.

Andrew and Camilla Parker Bowles moved into the house in 1973, the year of their marriage. In 1986 they sold it to the Earl and Countess Cairns, who were still the owners in 2020.

== Architecture ==
The house is a large 17th-century stone-tiled rubble stone building. Some parts are possibly 16th-century, containing a Tudor-arched fireplace. The grounds have a mid 17th-century dovecote and two summer houses. The four-bay front is described by Julian Orbach as "most attractive", and includes a two-storey porch of c.1700 which is topped by a balustrade having busts at its front corners.

The house was designated as Grade II* listed in 1952. Historic England summarises it as: "Large house, mid C17 with earlier origins. Rubble stone, ashlar dressings and porch front, stone-tiled roofs. L-plan main range, mid C17, in front of lower rear range, possibly C16" and discusses the restorations and alterations begun c.1927. At a later date, a 17th-century staircase was brought in.

Associated structures include a farmhouse, built to the rear of the house in the late 17th or early 18th century. The gates at the south entrance to the house have ashlar piers with ball finials, flanked by a pair of square stone lodges from the early 18th century; they have pyramidal stone tile roofs and small ball finials. Nearby is a substantial mid-17th-century dovecote, in rubble stone, rectangular and gabled. Just north-east of the house is a two-storey former coach-house dated 1806, and a nearby entrance to the garden – the original approach to the house – is flanked by a pair of mid-17th-century summerhouses, in rubble stone and ashlar.

== Present day ==
The gardens of the house are open to the public on one day each year through the National Gardens Scheme.

Bolehyde Manor was placed for sale by the Earl and Countess Cairns in 2011 for £4.76 million; it was not sold at that time. The property was again listed for sale in June 2020 for £3.75 million. A report by Country Life magazine indicated that the interior would benefit from some restoration. The 80-acre (32 ha) property included a three-bedroom annexe and three cottages with a "huge potential for improvement". The listing brochure provided no specifics as to any recent restoration or renovations.

== Sources ==
- Charles Mosley (2003), Burke's Peerage, Baronetage and Knightage, vol. 3 volumes (107 ed.), Wilmington, Delaware: Burke's Peerage & Gentry, p. 641, ISBN 978-0-9711966-2-9
