= Andrew Parker Bowles =

British Army officer (born 1939)

Brigadier Andrew Parker Bowles OBE OStJ
- Born: Andrew Henry Parker Bowles; 27 December 1939 (age 86); Surrey, England
- Spouses: Camilla Shand (m. 1973; div. 1995); Rosemary Pitman (m. 1996; died 2010)
- Partner: Anne Robinson (2023–present)
- Children: Tom Parker Bowles; Laura Lopes
- Mother: Ann de Trafford
- Relatives: Derek Paravicini (nephew)
- Military career
- Branch: British Army
- Service years: 1960–1994
- Rank: Brigadier
- Units: Royal Horse Guards; Blues and Royals; Household Cavalry Mounted Regiment
- Conflicts: Operation Motorman

Brigadier Andrew Henry Parker Bowles (born 27 December 1939) is a retired British Army officer. He is the former husband of Queen Camilla, who is now the wife of King Charles III.

== Early life and family ==
Andrew Parker Bowles was born on 27 December 1939 as the eldest of four children to Derek Henry Parker Bowles of Donnington Castle House in Berkshire, who was a great-grandson of Thomas Parker, 6th Earl of Macclesfield, and his wife Ann (née de Trafford), daughter of multimillionaire racehorse owner Sir Humphrey de Trafford, 4th Baronet. His christening announcement in The Times listed his godparents as Sir Humphrey de Trafford; William Cavendish, Marquess of Hartington (who married Kathleen "Kick" Kennedy, younger sister of U.S. president John F. Kennedy); Miss Mary de Trafford; and Miss Swinnerton-Dyer. His parents were friends of Queen Elizabeth the Queen Mother. Some sources state that the Queen Mother was also one of his godmothers.

Parker Bowles was a page to the then Lord Chancellor Lord Simons at the coronation of Queen Elizabeth II. He is an uncle of Derek Paravicini, a blind autistic savant.

As an amateur jockey, Parker Bowles rode in the 1969 Grand National on his horse, The Fossa, finishing the race in 11th place. He played on Prince Charles's polo team during their younger days.

== Military career ==
Parker Bowles was educated at the Benedictine Ampleforth College and the Royal Military Academy Sandhurst. He was commissioned into the Royal Horse Guards (The Blues) in 1960. He was aide-de-camp to the Governor-General of New Zealand, Sir Bernard Fergusson, in about 1965. He was then adjutant Royal Horse Guards (The Blues) 1967–1969. The regiment became The Blues and Royals (Royal Horse Guards and 1st Dragoons) 1969, and he was the adjutant of The Blues and Royals 1969–1970. Parker Bowles was promoted to major on 31 December 1971.

Parker Bowles was squadron leader of "B" squadron in 1972 on Operation Motorman in Ulster. Later he was Senior Military Liaison Officer to Lord Soames, when Soames was Governor of Southern Rhodesia during its transition to the majority rule state of Zimbabwe in 1979–1980. He was staff qualified (sq), and became a lieutenant colonel 30 June 1980. In 1980 he was awarded the Queen's Commendation for Bravery in Zimbabwe.

In 1981–1983, he was commanding officer of the Household Cavalry Mounted Regiment, and was commanding during the Hyde Park and Regent's Park bombings, when men and horses from his regiment were killed and injured by a terrorist bomb. He was one of the first to the scene, arriving on foot after hearing the bomb blast, and his orders led to the saving of later famous horse Sefton.

From 1987 to 1990, he was colonel commanding the Household Cavalry and Silver Stick in Waiting to Queen Elizabeth II. On 30 June 1990 he was promoted to brigadier, and was director of the Royal Army Veterinary Corps 1991–1994. He retired in 1994.

Parker Bowles held the following ranks:

- 23 January 1962, lieutenant
- 23 July 1966, captain
- 31 December 1971, major
- 1 December 1980, seniority backdated to 30 June 1980, lieutenant colonel
- 30 June 1987, colonel
- 31 December 1990, seniority backdated to 30 June 1990, brigadier
- 27 December 1994, retired

== Relationships and children ==
His godchildren include the circus trapeze artist Lady Emma Herbert, who was a bridesmaid at his first marriage on 4 July 1973, and Zara Tindall, daughter of Princess Anne.

Parker Bowles dated Princess Anne for a few years, beginning in June 1970. Parker Bowles's father, Derek, was a friend to Queen Elizabeth the Queen Mother. According to biographer Sally Bedell Smith, the relationship could not have been "very serious between Anne and Andrew because Andrew was Catholic", therefore a marriage was unlikely. The relationship ended sometime prior to Parker Bowles's engagement to Camilla Shand. Parker Bowles and Princess Anne remain friends. Their relationship was depicted in the third season of the Netflix series The Crown.

In 1973, after an intermittent relationship, Parker Bowles married Camilla Shand in a Catholic ceremony. Shand was a former girlfriend of the then-Prince of Wales. After marriage, the couple lived at Bolehyde Manor and, later, Middlewick House near Corsham in Wiltshire, and had two children, Tom and Laura. Laura attended St Mary's School, Shaftesbury, a Catholic girls' school in Dorset, while Tom attended Eton College. Parker Bowles had numerous extramarital affairs throughout his marriage to Camilla, including with several of Camilla's friends. They divorced in 1995.

Parker Bowles married his long-time companion Rosemary Alice Pitman (née Dickinson; 17 June 1940 – 10 January 2010) in 1996, a year after his divorce from Camilla. She was previously married to Lt Col John Hugh Pitman, with whom she had three sons. The couple attended the wedding of Prince Charles and Camilla Parker Bowles in 2005. Rosemary died from complications due to cancer in 2010. Princess Anne was present at her funeral service at St Aldhelm's Catholic Church, Malmesbury. Camilla attended her memorial service at the Guards Chapel in March 2010.

In December 2023, it was reported that Parker Bowles was in a relationship with the television presenter Anne Robinson.

== In media ==
Parker Bowles is one of three men upon whom Jilly Cooper's anti-hero Rupert Campbell-Black is based; the others are Rupert Lycett Green and Michael Howard, Earl of Suffolk.

In 2003, Parker Bowles posed for the painting The Brigadier by Lucian Freud. In 2015, the work sold for $34.89 million at Christie's. He was portrayed by Simon Wilson in Whatever Love Means (2005) and by Andrew Buchan in The Crown (2019).

== Honours ==
- He was awarded an Honorary Fellowship by the Royal Veterinary College in 2003.

Country / Organisation	Date	Award	Ribbon	Post-nominal letters	Notes
United Kingdom	1953	Queen Elizabeth II Coronation Medal			
United Kingdom	1980	Queen's Commendation for Brave Conduct			For actions in Zimbabwe (then Rhodesia) with Queen's Commendation for Brave Conduct
United Kingdom	1980	Rhodesia Medal			For actions in Zimbabwe (then Rhodesia) with Queen's Commendation for Brave Conduct
Zimbabwean	1980	Zimbabwean Independence Medal			
United Kingdom	1984	Officer of the Order of the British Empire		OBE	Military Division
United Kingdom	1989	Officer of the Order of St John		OStJ	
United Kingdom	Unknown	General Service Medal			
United Nations	Unknown	United Nations Medal (UNFICYP)			For peacekeeping in Cyprus
