= List of official overseas trips made by Charles III =

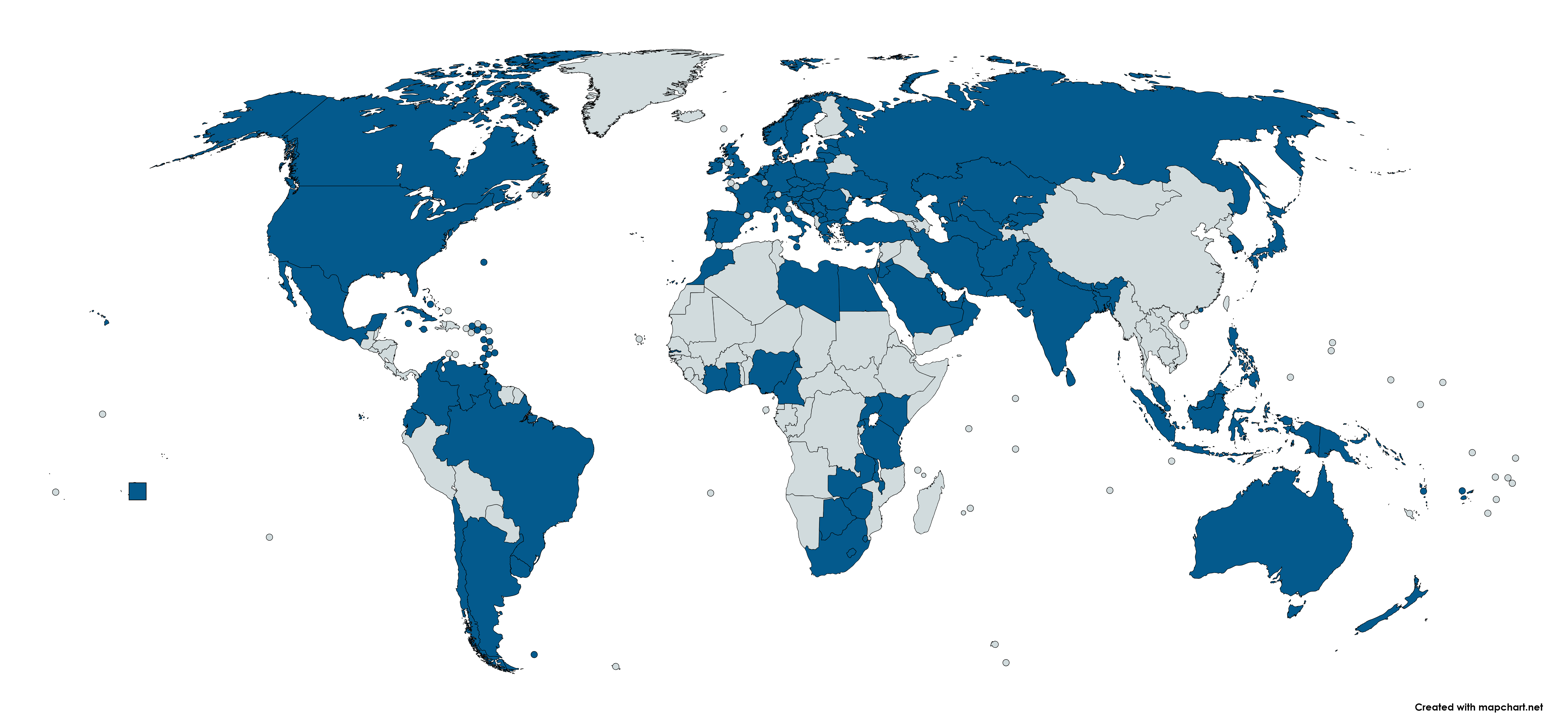
Map of countries visited by Charles III on an official overseas visit

As Duke of Cornwall, Prince of Wales and later as King, Charles III has been one of the United Kingdom's most important ambassadors. He travels overseas as a representative of the UK and also undertakes tours of Commonwealth realms. He is often accompanied by his wife, Queen Camilla.

== As Duke of Cornwall ==
Date	Country	Areas visited	Details
22–28 April 1954	Malta		Aboard HMY Britannia on her maiden voyage with Princess Anne
30 April – 1 May 1954	Libya	Tobruk	Joined the Queen and the Duke of Edinburgh on Royal Tour.
3–7 May 1954	Malta		

== As Prince of Wales ==
=== 1960s ===
Date	Country	Areas visited	Details	Host
30 January – 1 August 1966	Australia	Victoria	Attended two terms at Timbertop Campus of Geelong Grammar School	
4–12 May 1966	Territory of Papua (now Papua New Guinea)	Port Moresby, Popondetta	Visited Dogura Martyrs Memorial School in Popondetta with the Geelong Grammar School seniors	
1–3 August 1966	Mexico			
3–16 August 1966	Jamaica	Kingston	Accompanied the Duke of Edinburgh who opened the 1966 British Empire and Commonwealth Games	
20 December 1967	Australia		Represented the Queen at the memorial service for Prime Minister Harold Holt	
July 1968	Malta			
November 1969	Malta		Prince Charles visited Malta to attend the bicentenary celebrations of the Royal University of Malta.	

=== 1970s ===
Date	Country	Areas visited	Details	Host
8–9 February 1970	France	Strasbourg	As Chairman of the Countryside in 1970 Committee for Wales, accompanied his father the Duke of Edinburgh to attend the Council of Europe's Conservation Conference.	
12–30 March 1970	New Zealand		Toured the country with the Queen, the Duke of Edinburgh, and Princess Anne.	
30 March – 8 April 1970	Australia		Toured the country with the Queen, the Duke of Edinburgh, and Princess Anne.	
9–14 April 1970	Japan	Osaka	Attended Expo '70.	
2–15 July 1970	Canada	Ottawa	Carried out a two-day visit to Ottawa, before joining the Queen, the Duke of Edinburgh, and Princess Anne for a countrywide tour.	
16–18 July 1970	United States	Washington, D.C.	Visited the capital together with Princess Anne as guests of President Richard Nixon's daughters and son-in-law.	
9–15 October 1970	Dominion of Fiji		Represented the Queen at Fiji's independence celebrations.	
15–19 October 1970	Gilbert and Ellice Islands			
20–22 October 1970	Bermuda		To mark the 350th anniversary of the Parliament of Bermuda.	
22–25 October 1970	Barbados			
11–12 November 1970	France		On behalf of the Queen, attended a memorial service for Charles de Gaulle.	
6–20 February 1971	Kenya		Accompanied by Princess Anne.	
25–27 February 1971	West Germany	Osnabrück	Visited the 1st Battalion, the Royal Regiment of Wales, in his role as colonel-in-chief.	
17–18 May 1972	France		Accompanied the Queen and the Duke of Edinburgh on a state visit.	
29–31 October 1972	West Germany	West Berlin		
25–26 January 1973	West Germany		Visited the Royal Regiment of Wales, in his role as colonel-in-chief.	
1 June 1973	Saint Kitts		To open the Prince of Wales Bastion.	
6–11 July 1973	The Bahamas		To attend the independence celebrations on behalf of the Queen.	
29 January – 6 February 1974	New Zealand	Christchurch	Joined the Queen, the Duke of Edinburgh, Princess Anne, and Mark Phillips for the 1974 British Commonwealth Games.	
4 September 1974	New Zealand		Attended the funeral of Norman Kirk.	
8–12 October 1974	Fiji		Attended the centenary celebrations on behalf of the Queen.	
12–30 October 1974	Australia		Prince Charles was present for the inauguration of Anglo-Australian Telescope at Siding Spring Observatory.	
20–22 February 1975	India	New Delhi		
22–26 February 1975	Nepal		To attend the coronation of King Birendra of Nepal.	
20–30 April 1975	Canada	Ottawa, Northwest Territories		
14–19 September 1975	Papua New Guinea		Attended the independence celebrations on behalf of the Queen.	
9–11 November 1975	West Germany		Visited the Royal Regiment of Wales, in his role as colonel-in-chief.	
23–25 July 1976	Canada	Montreal	To watch the equestrian events of the 1976 Summer Olympics, where Princess Anne was a competitor.	
6–16 March 1977	Kenya			
17–25 March 1977	Ghana		To take part in the celebrations of Achimota School's 50th anniversary.	
25–28 March 1977	Ivory Coast		Toured the country at the invitation of President Félix Houphouët-Boigny.	President Houphouët-Boigny
28–29 April 1977	Monaco		To attend a Humanitarian Award banquet organised by the Variety Club International.	
9 May 1977	France	Bordeaux	Viewed an exhibition of British paintings.	
5–9 July 1977	Canada	Alberta	Celebrations of the centenary of signing of treaty by Blackfoot and other Indian leaders.	
18–30 October 1977	United States	Chicago, Cleveland, St. Louis, Atlanta, Charleston, Houston, Los Angeles, San Francisco		
1–11 November 1977	Australia		Toured the country in his capacity as patron of the Queen's Australian Silver Jubilee Appeal.	
17–18 November 1977	West Germany		Visited the 1st Battalion, Welsh Guards, as their colonel.	
31 January 1978	West Germany	West Berlin	Visited the 2nd Parachute Regiment, as their colonel.	
10 February 1978	West Germany		Visited the Cheshire Regiment, as their colonel.	
8–16 March 1978	Brazil			
16–22 March 1978	Venezuela			
18–19 May 1978	Australia	Melbourne	Attended the funeral of Sir Robert Menzies.	
1–2 July 1978	Norway		Attended the 75th birthday celebrations for King Olav V of Norway.	
31 August 1978	Kenya		Attended the funeral of President Jomo Kenyatta.	
23–27 October 1978	Yugoslavia			
1978	West Germany	Osnabrück, Sennelager	Visited Parachute Regiments.	
29 November – 1 December 1978	Belgium	Brussels	Joined the European Commission for discussions and visited NATO headquarters.	
3–6 March 1979	British Hong Kong			
6–8 March 1979	Singapore			
8–28 March 1979	Australia	Canberra, Western Australia		
1–6 April 1979	Canada		In his capacity as president of the International Council of the United World Colleges, Prince Charles visited Pearson College UWC.	
29–30 May 1979	West Germany		Visited 2nd Parachute Regiment.	
28–29 June 1979	France	Tours-sur-Marne	Attended a fundraising dinner for United World Colleges.	

=== 1980s ===
Date	Country	Areas visited	Details	Host
18 January 1980	Switzerland	Zurich	Attended a luncheon to mark the 60th anniversary of the British-Swiss Chamber of Commerce.	
30 March – 3 April 1980	Canada	Ottawa, British Columbia	Attended engagements in his capacity as president of the International Council of the United World Colleges.	
15–18 April 1980	Zimbabwe		Attended independence celebrations on behalf of the Queen.	
29 April – 1 May 1980	Netherlands		Attended the accession ceremony of Queen Beatrix of the Netherlands on behalf of the Queen.	
21–23 July 1980	France		A tour of the French Armed Forces.	
24 November – 6 December 1980	India	Calcutta	Prince Charles met Mother Teresa during a visit to her home in Calcutta in December 1980.	
6–13 December 1980	Nepal			
31 March – 12 April 1981	New Zealand			
12–28 April 1981	Australia		Opened the convention organised for the 50th anniversary of the Apex Clubs of Australia.	
28–30 April 1981	Venezuela		Travelled to the country in his capacity as president of the International Council of the United World Colleges.	
30 April – 3 May 1981	United States	Williamsburg, Washington, D.C.	Received an honorary fellowship from the College of William & Mary and attended a dinner party by President Ronald Reagan and First Lady Nancy Reagan.	
17–18 June 1981	United States	New York City	Flew by Concorde for the first time.	
10 October 1981	Egypt		Attend the funeral of President Anwar Sadat.	
20 June 1982	France		Commemoration of the 40th anniversary of the Allied raid on Bruneval Raid.	
27–29 October 1982	United States	Montezuma	In his capacity as president of the International Council of the United World Colleges, Prince Charles opened the Armand Hammer United World College of the American West at Montezuma.	
29–30 October 1982	Canada	British Columbia	Visited the Lester B. Pearson College of the Pacific.	
20 March – 17 April 1983	Australia	Alice Springs, Canberra, Sydney, Hobart, Bunbury, Adelaide, Renmark, Perth, Melbourne, Yandina, Ballarat	Prince Charles landed in Alice Springs and visited Uluru. The Prince met Prime Minister Bob Hawke and his wife, Hazel at the Government House in Canberra. He visited the Sydney Opera House and Sydney's Wentworth Hotel. He attended a state reception in Hobart, Tasmania and drove through Hands Oval sports ground in Bunbury. He also visited Adelaide, Renmark, Perth, Melbourne, Yandina and Ballarat. It was the Prince and Princess of Wales and Prince William's first overseas royal tour as a family.	Prime Minister Hawke
17–30 April 1983	New Zealand	Auckland, Wellington, Christchurch, Dunedin, Tauranga, Masterton, Gisborne, Waitangi	Prince Charles visited the Government House and Eden Park. He was accompanied by Diana, Princess of Wales and their nine-month-old son Prince William. The 1983 New Zealand Royal Visit Honours were appointed by Queen Elizabeth II to mark the visit.	
14 June – 1 July 1983	Canada	Nova Scotia, Prince Edward Island, New Brunswick, Newfoundland and Labrador, Ottawa, Edmonton	Prince Charles toured Canada accompanied by his wife, the Princess of Wales.	
22–25 February 1984	Brunei		Attended the country’s independence celebrations on behalf of the Queen.	
19–29 March 1984	Tanzania; Zambia; Zimbabwe; Botswana		Toured the countries as a director of the Commonwealth Development Corporation.	
5 June 1984	France	Ranville	Commemorating the role of the 6th Airborne Division during the Normandy landings.	
11–13 July 1984	West Germany		Visited the Royal Regiment of Wales and the Gordon Highlanders.	
3–4 August 1984	Monaco	Monte Carlo	Attended the United World Colleges gala.	
6–10 August 1984	Papua New Guinea		Opened the new Parliament House and undertook other engagements.	
23 September 1984	Netherlands		Prince Charles was present at a service held to mark the 40th anniversary of the Battle of Arnhem in his capacity as colonel-in-chief of the Parachute Regiment.	
28 October – 1 November 1984	Italy	Trieste, Duino		
21–22 February 1985	Norway		Visited the 1st Battalion, the Parachute Regiment, in his capacity as colonel-in-chief.	
26–27 March 1985	West Germany	Hohne	Visited the 1st Battalion, the Welsh Guards, in his capacity as colonel.	
19 April – 9 May 1985	Italy; Vatican City	Sardinia, La Spezia, Milan, Florence, Rome, Vatican City, Catania, Syracuse, Bari, Venice	The Prince and Princess of Wales undertook a 17-day tour of Italy and were joined by Prince William and Prince Harry at the end of their tour.	
6–7 June 1985	West Germany	West Berlin	Took the Salute at The Queen's Birthday Parade in Berlin, 6 to 7 June.	
25 October – 8 November 1985	Australia	Melbourne, Portland, Mildura, Canberra	Visit with the Princess of Wales, to Victoria in connection with the state's 150th anniversary celebrations	
8 November 1985	Fiji		Accompanied by the Princess of Wales.	
9–13 November 1985	United States	Washington, D.C., Palm Beach	The Prince and Princess of Wales visited Washington, D.C. in which he met President Ronald Reagan at the White House and also visited the Octagon museum which was administered by the American Institute of Architects. The couple stayed at the British Ambassador's residence in Washington, D.C. for the duration of the visit. Prince Charles then flew to Palm Beach, Florida in which he met Governor Bob Graham. He also attended a dinner at the Breakers Hotel and played polo at the International Polo Club.	President Reagan
17–23 February 1986	United States	Texas, California		
14–16 April 1986	Austria	Vienna	Accompanied by the Princess of Wales.	
30 April – 7 May 1986	Canada	Vancouver, Victoria, Kelowna, Kamloops, Nanaimo, Prince George	The Prince and Princess of Wales visited Canada and attended Expo 86.	
8–13 May 1986	Japan	Tokyo, Osaka, Kyoto	The Prince and Princess of Wales watched a sumo tournament in Kokugikan Arena in downtown Tokyo, Japan. They also visited the Kyoto Imperial Palace and Buddhist temples. Charles addressed the National Diet and the couple attended a state banquet hosted by Emperor Hirohito at the Tokyo Imperial Palace.	Emperor Hirohito
7–14 August 1986	Spain	Mallorca	The Prince and Princess of Wales and Princes William and Harry visited Mallorca as guests of the Spanish royal family.	
2–5 September 1986	United States	Cambridge, Chicago	Attended Harvard University's 350th anniversary celebrations and undertook other engagements.	
10–19 November 1986	Oman; Qatar; Bahrain; Saudi Arabia	Muscat, Doha, Manama, Riyadh, Jeddah	The Prince and Princess of Wales embarked on their first tour of the Middle East together.	
24–26 November 1986	Cyprus		Visited the 3rd Battalion, the Parachute Regiment, in his capacity as colonel-in-chief.	
11–14 February 1987	Portugal	Lisbon, Porto	The Prince and Princess of Wales visited Portugal to highlight the country's 601-year-old alliance with England (see Treaty of Windsor (1386)) and attended a banquet at the Palace of Ajuda.	
14 February 1987	France	Toulouse	The Prince and Princess of Wales visited Toulouse for the launch of the Airbus A320.	
11–12 March 1987	Belgium	Zeebrugge, Brussels	Met with survivors of Herald of Free Enterprise disaster and visited NATO headquarters.	
27 March – 2 April 1987	Swaziland; Malawi; Kenya		Toured the countries in his capacity as a director of the Commonwealth Development Corporation.	
23–26 April 1987	Spain	Toledo, Madrid, Seville, Salamanca	The Prince and Princess of Wales met King Juan Carlos I and Queen Sofía during a visit to Toledo.	
26 April – 2 May 1987	Italy	Bologna	During the visit, Prince Charles received an honorary doctorate from the University of Bologna.	
15 May 1987	France	Cannes	The Prince and Princess of Wales appeared on the red carpet at the 1987 Cannes Film Festival in support of the British film industry.	
9 September 1987	France	Caen, Bayeux	The Prince and Princess of Wales visited Normandy to mark the 900th anniversary of the death of William the Conqueror.	
1–7 November 1987	West Germany	West Berlin, Bonn, Cologne, Munich, Hamburg, Celle, Hanover	The Prince and Princess of Wales went on a 6-day trip to West Germany.	
7–8 December 1987	Italy	Milan	Visited La Scala.	
25 January – 3 February 1988	Australia	New South Wales, Victoria, South Australia, Northern Territory	The Prince and Princess of Wales made the trip to join the Australia 200th anniversary celebrations.	
3–5 February 1988	Thailand	Bangkok, Chiang Mai	The Prince and Princess of Wales visited Thailand as a part of Bhumibol Adulyadej's 60th birthday celebrations.	
4–7 March 1988	United States	Pittsburgh, Palm Beach		
8–9 May 1988	France	Roscoff, Brittany		
1 August 1988	West Germany	Schleswig-Holstein	Attended the Schleswig-Holstein Musik Festival.	
26–27 October 1988	Netherlands		A visit in his capacity as patron of the William and Mary Tercentenary Trust.	
7–11 November 1988	France	Paris, Blois	Accompanied by the Princess of Wales.	
17–20 February 1989	United States	Washington, D.C., Palm Beach		
20–22 February 1989	Saint Lucia		Took part in the 10th anniversary of independence celebrations.	
22–24 February 1989	Venezuela		Undertook engagements associated with the United World Colleges.	
12–17 March 1989	Kuwait; Bahrain; United Arab Emirates	Kuwait City, Manama, Abu Dhabi, Dubai	The Prince and Princess of Wales toured some of the Arab states of the Persian Gulf together.	
29 April 1989	Italy	Rome		
11 May 1989	Turkey	Ankara		
3–7 November 1989	Indonesia	Jakarta, Yogyakarta	Before their visit to Hong Kong, the Prince and Princess of Wales were due to visit China. The trip was cancelled and they visited Indonesia instead.	
7–9 November 1989	British Hong Kong	Hong Kong Island, Kowloon, New Territories		

=== 1990s ===
Date	Country	Areas visited	Details	Host
12–13 February 1990	Italy	Rome, Subiaco	Working on a project for BBC Earth.	
16–23 February 1990	United States	Florida, Charleston, Washington, D.C.	Took part in a charity polo match and attended engagements in his role as president of Business in the Community.	
15–20 March 1990	Nigeria	Abuja, Lagos	The Prince and Princess of Wales visited Nigeria, where they attended a banquet by Ibrahim Babangida at the State House.	President Babangida
21–23 March 1990	Cameroon	Douala, Yaoundé	The Prince and Princess of Wales arrived abroad HMY Britannia at Douala, before flying to Yaoundé. The president of Cameroon hosted an official dinner to welcome them in Yaoundé.	
26–28 March 1990	Italy	Trieste	Attended engagements for the United World Colleges.	
7–10 May 1990	Hungary	Budapest	This visit by the Prince and Princess of Wales marked the first tour of a Warsaw Pact country by members of the British royal family. They attended a dinner hosted by President Árpád Göncz and viewed a fashion display at the Museum of Applied Arts in Budapest.	President Göncz
10–14 November 1990	Japan	Tokyo	The Prince and Princess of Wales went to Japan to attend the enthronement of Emperor Akihito.	
17–18 December 1990	France		Met with President François Mitterrand and sat for a TV interview.	
21–23 December 1990	Saudi Arabia		Met with British forces deployed for the Gulf War.	
29–30 January 1991	Norway	Oslo	The Prince represented the Queen at the funeral of King Olav V.	
22–27 April 1991	Brazil	Brasília, São Paulo, Rio de Janeiro, Aracruz	Accompanied by his wife, Charles met with business and industry leaders during the tour.	
30 April – 1 May 1991	Spain	Madrid	Attended the EC Environment Conference.	
6–10 May 1991	Czechoslovakia	Prague, Bratislava, Brno	Accompanied by the Princess of Wales.	
23–24 May 1991	India	Delhi	Prince Charles travelled to India to attend the funeral of Prime Minister Rajiv Gandhi.	
10 June 1991	Germany	Munster	The Prince and Princess of Wales attended a Gulf Drumhead Service.	
7–8 September 1991	Switzerland		Attended events marking the country's 700th anniversary celebrations.	
13–15 September 1991	Italy	Rome, Urbino, Ischia	Met with President Francesco Cossiga, visited the Prince of Wales's Summer School at Villa Lante, and undertook engagemants as patron of the William Walton Foundation.	
23–29 October 1991	Canada	Greater Sudbury, Toronto, Kingston, Ottawa	The Prince and Princess of Wales toured Ontario, while their sons remained in Toronto. The couple visited Queen's University in Kingston, Ontario, where they presented the university with a replica of their royal charter and the Prince received an honorary degree. The Princess of Wales and the children left on 27 October.	
12 November 1991	Belgium		Prince Charles received the European environmental award.	
12–13 November 1991	Netherlands	The Hague	Visited environmental projects.	
10–11 December 1991	Germany	Leipzig, Berlin	Visited environmental projects.	
4–5 February 1992	Switzerland	Davos	Attended the World Economic Forum.	
7–10 February 1992	Oman		Attended engagements at the British council.	
10–15 February 1992	India	Delhi, Jaipur, Hyderabad, Bangalore (only by the Prince of Wales), Agra and Calcutta (only by the Princess of Wales)	The Prince and Princess of Wales toured India, engaging in charity and business activities. Prince Charles had talks with President Ramaswamy Venkataraman and the couple attended a dinner banquet hosted by Vice President Shankar Dayal Sharma.	President Venkataraman
15–19 February 1992	Nepal		Met with King Birendra of Nepal.	
2–3 March 1992	France		Met with President François Mitterrand and delivered a speech at the 75th anniversary of France Grande Bretagne Association.	
11 March 1992	Germany	Paderborn	Visited the 5th Royal Inniskilling Dragoon Guards as colonel-in-chief.	
23–24 March 1992	Germany	Berlin	Visited the Gordon Highlanders as colonel-in-chief.	
26–28 March 1992	Italy	Rome, Spoleto, Florence, Turin		
20–22 May 1992	Spain	Seville	The Prince and Princess of Wales were present for the UK National Day at the Seville Expo '92.	
9 June 1992	Denmark	Copenhagen	Attended the celebrations marking the 25th wedding anniversary of Queen Margrethe II of Denmark and Prince Henrik.	
28–29 September 1992	Italy	Rome, Bologna		
2–5 November 1992	South Korea	Seoul, Gyeongju, Ulsan	The Prince and Princess of Wales visited South Korea at the invitation of President Roh Tae-woo, becoming the first members of the British royal family to tour the country. This was their last official joint visit before their separation in December 1992.	
5–8 November 1992	British Hong Kong			
17–19 November 1992	Belgium; France	Strasbourg, Brussels	Visited European Parliament and the Council of Europe.	
3–4 December 1992	France	Paris, Versailles		
21–23 December 1992	Czechoslovakia	Prague, České Budějovice	Attended events for the Prague Heritage Fund.	
12–14 February 1993	United States	Washington, D.C., Williamsburg	Attended events marking the College of William & Mary's tercentenary celebrations.	
14–18 February 1993	Mexico	Mexico City, Guadalajara, Oaxaca		
18 February 1993	Jamaica			
10 March 1993	Germany	Munich		
15–16 March 1993	Yugoslavia		Visited the former country's territories to meet the UK forces on UN duties.	
17–19 March 1993	Germany	Bonn	Met with Chancellor Helmut Kohl and received the Ecological Eagle Award.	
17–20 May 1993	Poland	Gdańsk	Invited by Lech Wałęsa. Gdańsk was just one stop on the entire trip.	
24 January – 5 February 1994	Australia	Sydney, Parkes, Tasmania, Hobart, Strahan, Launceston, Perth, Karratha	While Charles was visiting Australia on Australia Day in January 1994, David Kang fired two shots at him from a starting pistol in protest of the treatment of several hundred Cambodian asylum seekers held in detention camps.	
5–10 February 1994	New Zealand	Auckland, Wellington, Hokitika, Christchurch, Hamilton		
16 March 1994	France	Paris	Visited the British Council, met with President François Mitterrand, and attended a concert.	
27–28 April 1994	Hungary	Budapest, Kecskemét		
16–19 May 1994	Russia	Saint Petersburg	Prince Charles visited Saint Petersburg in May 1994.	
27 May 1994	Germany	Berlin	Visited the city to take part in the 20th meeting of the Prince of Wales's Business Leaders Forum.	
3–5 June 1994	Czech Republic; France	Prague, Ranville	Prince Charles travelled to Prague for a Prague Heritage Fund event and took part in commemorations of the 50th anniversary of Normandy landings.	
1–2 September 1994	Italy	Viterbo, Venice	Visited the Prince of Wales's Institute of Architecture Summer School and viewed an exhibition in Venice.	
17–18 September 1994	Netherlands		Travelled to the country to take part in commemorations of the 50th anniversary of the Battle of Arnhem.	
28 October 1994	Germany	Rheindahlen, Mönchengladbach	Attended parade of the British Army of the Rhine.	
1–4 November 1994	United States	Los Angeles	Travelled to the US for UK - LA '94.	
5–8 November 1994	British Hong Kong			
11–15 March 1995	Egypt	Cairo, Sinai Peninsula, Luxor		
15–18 March 1995	Morocco	Rabat, Fez, Casablanca		
18 March 1995	Spain	Seville	Attended the wedding of Infanta Elena, Duchess of Lugo, and Jaime de Marichalar.	
2–3 May 1995	Germany	Hamburg	Took part in events that commemorated the 50th anniversary of the end of the Second World War.	
31 May – 1 June 1995	Republic of Ireland	Dublin	It was the first official visit by a member of the British royal family since Irish Independence.	
4–5 August 1995	Italy	Caprarola	Visited the Prince of Wales's Institute of Architecture Summer School.	
31 August – 1 September 1995	France	Paris, Biarritz	Viewed British works at Galeries Lafayette and visited the Prince of Wales's Institute of Architecture Summer School.	
1–6 October 1995	Oman			
6 November 1995	Israel	Jerusalem	Attended the funeral of Prime Minister Yitzhak Rabin.	
13–16 November 1995	Germany	Berlin, Brandenburg, Mecklenburg-Vorpommern, Munich		
17 November 1995	Latvia	Riga	Presented gift of silver bowl to the Church of Saint Saviour for use as baptismal font.	
8 February 1996	Croatia	Dubrovnik, Split		
9 February 1996	Bosnia and Herzegovina	Sarajevo		
23–27 February 1996	Morocco	Marrakesh, Ouarzazate, Ifrane, Rabat		
22 March 1996	Italy		Opened Urban Renaissance Exhibition in his capacity as president of the Institute of Architecture.	
23–29 April 1996	Canada	Manitoba, Ontario, New Brunswick		
13–16 July 1996	Brunei	Bandar Seri Begawan, Seria	Visited the Royal Gurkha Rifles.	
17–19 July 1996	United States	Asheville, New York City, Newport	Visited the Prince of Wales's Institute of Architecture Summer School and carried out engagements for the Mary Rose Trust.	
14 August 1996	Croatia		Toured Mljet National Park.	
1–2 September 1996	Germany	Berlin, Potsdam	Carried out engagements in connection with the Prince of Wales's Institute of Architecture.	
29–30 October 1996	Belgium	Brussels		
4–12 November 1996	Ukraine; Turkmenistan; Kazakhstan; Kyrgyzstan; Uzbekistan			
21–22 December 1996	Turkey	Istanbul	Attended the christening of Princess Maria-Olympia of Greece and Denmark.	
31 January 1997	Germany	Darmstadt	Attended the funeral of Margaret, Princess of Hesse and by Rhine.	
21–25 February 1997	Kuwait; Bahrain; Qatar		Aboard HMY Britannia.	
26–28 February 1997	Bangladesh	Dhaka, Sylhet		
4–6 March 1997	Saudi Arabia	Riyadh		
26 March 1997	United States	New York City	Visited the UN headquarters.	
26 March 1997	France	Paris		
12–13 May 1997	Germany	Hesse		
21–22 June 1997	Norway	Trondheim	Attended King Harald V and Queen Sonja of Norway's 60th birthday celebrations.	
27–30 June 1997	British Hong Kong	Hong Kong	Prince Charles represented the Queen at the Hong Kong handover ceremony.	
3 July 1997	Philippines	Manila	Aboard HMY Britannia.	
31 October – 5 November 1997	South Africa; Lesotho	Pretoria, Durban, Cape Town, Johannesburg	Prince Harry joined his father from 29 October to 3 November.	
31 January 1998	Netherlands		Attended Queen Beatrix's birthday celebrations.	
3–6 February 1998	Sri Lanka	Colombo	Took part in celebrations for the 50th anniversary of the country's Independence Day.	
6–9 February 1998	Nepal	Kathmandu, Patichaur, Besisahar		
9–12 February 1998	Bhutan			
23–24 March 1998	Canada	Vancouver	Accompanied by Prince William and Prince Harry.	
26 June 1998	France	Lens	Watched England vs Colombia World Cup match, accompanied by Prince Harry.	
27–28 June 1998	Portugal	Vasco da Gama Bridge, Alcochete, Lisbon	Met with the president of Portugal and attended Expo '98.	
2–3 November 1998	Slovenia	Bled Island, Triglav National Park, Brdo Castle, Ljubljana	Attended a dinner hosted by the president of Slovenia and opened the British Week in Ljubljana.	
3–6 November 1998	Romania	Bucharest, Sibiu	Met with the president and prime minister of Romania.	
6–8 November 1998	Bulgaria	Sofia, Plovdiv	Met with Petar Stoyanov, President of Bulgaria.	
8–9 November 1998	Macedonia	Skopje, Ohrid	Met with the president of Macedonia.	
22–24 November 1998	Greece	Athens, Crete	Met with the president and prime minister of Greece.	
8 February 1999	Jordan	Amman	The Prince of Wales, on behalf of Queen Elizabeth II, attended the state funeral of King Hussein of Jordan.	
8–11 March 1999	Argentina	Buenos Aires	After President Carlos Menem travelled to the UK and invited the Queen to visit Argentina, she sent the Prince of Wales in her representation. In Buenos Aires, the Prince of Wales toured the city, and paid respects to the fallen during the Falklands War between the two countries.	
11–13 March 1999	Uruguay	Montevideo	Met with the president Julio María Sanguinetti.	
13–16 March 1999	Falkland Islands	Stanley		
29 May 1999	Nigeria	Abuja	Attended the inauguration of President Olusegun Obasanjo.	
13 September 1999	Kosovo	Pristina		
17–20 November 1999	United Arab Emirates	Abu Dhabi, Dubai	Met with the royal families of the United Arab Emirates.	
20–22 November 1999	Oman	Muscat	Met with Sultan Qaboos bin Said.	
22–23 November 1999	Saudi Arabia	Riyadh	Met with King Fahd and Crown Prince Abdullah of Saudi Arabia.	
4 December 1999	Belgium	Brussels	The Prince of Wales attended the wedding of Prince Philippe and Mathilde d'Udekem d'Acoz.	

=== 2000s ===
Date	Country	Areas visited	Details	Host
21–24 February 2000	Trinidad and Tobago	Saint Augustine		
24–27 February 2000	Guyana	Georgetown, Iwokrama Forest		
27–29 February 2000	Jamaica	Kingston, Kingston Harbour, Trenchtown		
16 May 2000	Hungary	Budapest		
30–31 October 2000	Czech Republic	Prague		
1–2 November 2000	Slovakia	Bratislava		
2–3 November 2000	Switzerland	Bern, Kandersteg	Prince Charles arrived in the Swiss capital of Bern where he was welcomed by Swiss Confederation president Adolf Ogi and the Swiss military band. Prince Charles visited Ogi's native village of Kandersteg where he toured the local church. He also dined at Lohn Estate which was the official government guest house and visited Bern's Old City which is listed as a UNESCO World Heritage Site.	
14 November 2000	Denmark	Roskilde	Prince Charles represented Queen Elizabeth II at the funeral of Queen Ingrid.	
16–18 February 2001	Saudi Arabia	Riyadh		
25 April – 1 May 2001	Canada	Ottawa, Saskatchewan, Yukon, Toronto		
11 May 2001	Spain	Valencia		
5 June 2001	Germany	Münster, Paderborn		
25 August 2001	Norway	Oslo	Attended the Wedding of Haakon, Crown Prince of Norway, and Mette-Marit Tjessem Høiby	
5–6 November 2001	Estonia	Tallinn, Tartu		
6–8 November 2001	Lithuania	Vilnius		
8–9 November 2001	Latvia	Daugavpils, Riga		
1–2 February 2002	Netherlands	Amsterdam	The Prince attended the wedding of Prince Willem-Alexander and Máxima Zorreguieta.	
4–6 March 2002	Brazil	Brasília, Rio de Janeiro, Palmas, Bananal Island		
6–8 March 2002	Mexico	Veracruz, Xalapa, Puebla, Mexico City		
11–12 June 2002	Germany	Lübeck, Berlin		
12–13 June 2002	Poland	Kraków, Tatra Mountains		
15 October 2002	Netherlands	Delft	The Prince attended the funeral of Prince Claus of the Netherlands.	
4–8 November 2002	Italy	Florence, Rome, Ischia, Naples		
6 February 2003	France	Paris		
13–14 March 2003	Bulgaria	Sofia, Varna	Met with Georgi Parvanov, President of Bulgaria and Simeon Saxe-Coburg-Gotha (Tsar Simeon II), Prime Minister of Bulgaria.	
13–16 July 2003	Russia	Saint Petersburg, Solovetsky Islands		
28 October – 5 November 2003	India	Delhi, Jaipur, Jodhpur, Mumbai	Prince Charles' tour focused on the environment, heritage restoration, bilateral ties and helping young business people. In Mumbai, he visited the set of the film Mangal Pandey: The Rising.	
6–8 November 2003	Oman	Muscat		
8 February 2004	Iraq	Basra	Prince Charles visited British troops serving in Basra.	
9 February 2004	Iran	Tehran, Bam	Prince Charles visited the city of Tehran where he held talks with Iranian president, Mohammad Khatami. Prince Charles as a patron of the British Red Cross visited the Iranian city of Bam where he met with survivors of the 2003 Bam earthquake. He also visited the ruins of the Arg-e Bam, a UNESCO World Heritage Site which had been destroyed by the earthquake.	
10 February 2004	Saudi Arabia	Riyadh		
22–24 March 2004	Spain	Madrid	Attended the Wedding of Prince Felipe and Letizia Ortiz.	
26 March 2004	Switzerland	Geneva		
5 June 2004	France	Normandy	To mark the 60th anniversary of D-Day.	
11 June 2004	United States	Washington, D.C.	The Prince represented the Queen at the state funeral of former President Ronald Reagan.	
23 July 2004	Bosnia and Herzegovina	Mostar		
September 2004	France	Paris		
September 2004	Netherlands	Oosterbeek		
September 2004	Germany	Sennelager		
October 2004	Italy	Turin		
October 2004	Turkey	Istanbul, Mardin		
October 2004	Jordan	As-Salt, Ajloun, Amman, Petra		
November 2004	United Arab Emirates	Abu Dhabi		
28 February 2005	Sri Lanka	Batticaloa	Visited areas affected by the 2004 Indian Ocean earthquake and tsunami.	
28 February – 6 March 2005	Australia	Perth, Alice Springs, Melbourne, Sydney, Canberra		
6–10 March 2005	New Zealand	Dunedin, Wellington, Auckland		
10–11 March 2005	Fiji	Viseisei, Nadi		
8 April 2005	Vatican City		Attended the funeral of Pope John Paul II.	
25 April 2005	Turkey	ANZAC Cove, Gallipoli	Attended ceremonies marking the 90th anniversary of the Gallipoli landings.	
27 June 2005	Germany	Münster	Visited the Royal Dragoon Guards.	
2 August 2005	Saudi Arabia	Riyadh	Attended the funeral of King Fahd.	
1–8 November 2005	United States	Washington, D.C., New York City, San Francisco, New Orleans	Accompanied by the Duchess of Cornwall, in what was their first joint overseas tour together.	President Bush
9 December 2005	Switzerland	Klosters	Opened a new suspension bridge in the area.	
20–24 March 2006	Egypt	Cairo	Accompanied by the Duchess of Cornwall.	
24–26 March 2006	Saudi Arabia	Riyadh	Accompanied by the Duchess of Cornwall.	
26–31 March 2006	India	Delhi, Rajasthan, Jodhpur, Jaipur	Accompanied by the Duchess of Cornwall.	
23 May 2006	Switzerland	Geneva	Delivered a speech on integrated health to the World Health Assembly.	
29 October – 3 November 2006	Pakistan	Islamabad, Rawalpindi, Lahore	Accompanied by the Duchess of Cornwall.	
27 October - 28 October 2006	Sierra Leone	Freetown	The Prince was received by President Ahmad Tejan Kabbah and the UK's high commissioner Sarah MacIntosh.	
28–30 November 2006	Nigeria	Abuja, Kaduna, Kano	The trip aimed to support regional stability, sustainable development, national reconciliation, and poverty reduction.	
27–28 January 2007	United States	New York City, Philadelphia	Accompanied by the Duchess of Cornwall, Prince Charles was presented with 10th Global Environmental Citizen Award from Harvard Medical School Center for Health and the Global Environment.	
19–28 February 2007	Kuwait; Qatar; Bahrain; United Arab Emirates		Accompanied by the Duchess of Cornwall.	
1 March 2007	Bosnia and Herzegovina	Banja Luka	Accompanied by the Duchess of Cornwall, Prince Charles visited the 1st Battalion Welsh Guards.	
22–29 November 2007	Uganda; Turkey		The Prince and the Duchess visited Uganda to attend the 20th Commonwealth Heads of Government Meeting (CHOGM) In Turkey, the couple carried out engagements concerned with sustainable development, youth opportunity and environmental protection.	
4–14 March 2008	Trinidad and Tobago; Saint Lucia; Montserrat; Jamaica		Accompanied by the Duchess of Cornwall. The main purpose of this Caribbean tour was to discuss national security, eco-tourism, and environmental protection with local leaders.	
27 October – 5 November 2008	Japan; Brunei; Indonesia	Tokyo, Bandar Seri Begawan, Jakarta	The Duchess of Cornwall accompanied Prince Charles during the visit to Japan and Brunei. The visit to Japan marked the 150th anniversary of diplomatic relations between the UK and Japan. At the invitation of the President Susilo Bambang Yudhoyono from Indonesia, Prince Charles delivered the Presidential Lecture in the country's capital.	
10–11 November 2008	France	Paris, Verdun	The Prince of Wales and the Duchess of Cornwall attended a dinner hosted by President Nicolas Sarkozy and attended the Armistice Day commemorations.	
8–11 March 2009	Chile	Santiago, Valparaíso	Accompanied by the Duchess of Cornwall. They discussed climate change and military ties with President Michelle Bachelet and helped launch an energy efficiency campaign.	
11–15 March 2009	Brazil	Brasília, Rio de Janeiro	Accompanied by the Duchess of Cornwall. The royals met with Brazilian President Luiz Inácio Lula da Silva, local politicians and businessmen, and indigenous community to discuss the threat of climate change.	
15–17 March 2009	Ecuador	Galápagos Islands	Accompanied by the Duchess of Cornwall. The Prince met Ecuador's vice president Lenín Moreno. This visit coincided with the 200th anniversary of the birth of Charles Darwin and the 150th anniversary of the publication of On the Origin of Species.	
26–29 April 2009	Italy; Vatican City	Rome, Venice	Accompanied by the Duchess of Cornwall, Prince Charles delivered a speech at the Chamber of Deputies. The Prince and the Duchess met with Pope Benedict XVI on 27 April.	
29–30 April 2009	Germany		Accompanied by the Duchess of Cornwall. This visit focused on global sustainability, social inclusion and long-term Anglo-German partnership and co-operation.	
6 June 2009	France	Normandy	Prince Charles attended events to mark the 65th anniversary of D-Day.	
2–12 November 2009	Canada	St. John's, Toronto, Victoria, Vancouver, Montreal, Ottawa	Accompanied by the Duchess of Cornwall. The royal couple attended a series of events, including a visit to Olympic sites in Vancouver and the National War Memorial in Ottawa for National Remembrance Day ceremony.	

=== 2010s ===
Date	Country	Areas visited	Details	Host
15–23 March 2010	Poland; Czech Republic; Hungary	Warsaw, Prague, Budapest	Accompanied by the Duchess of Cornwall. The main focus of this tour was protection of the common cultural and environmental heritage, as well as the sustainable development projects.	
25 March 2010	Afghanistan		Prince Charles visited British troops deployed in the country.	
27 May 2010	Norway	Oslo	Prince Charles delivered a speech at the Oslo Climate and Forest Conference.	
19 July 2010	France	Fromelles	The Prince and the Duchess attended events commemorating 250 British soldiers from the First World War.	
26 July 2010	Germany	Gütersloh	Prince Charles visited 1 Regiment Army Air Corps as colonel-in-chief, presenting Afghanistan Campaign Medals in Gütersloh.	
October 2010	India	Delhi	Accompanied by the Duchess of Cornwall, Prince Charles opened the 2010 Commonwealth Games on behalf of the Queen, along with the President of India.	
9 February 2011	Belgium	Brussels	Prince Charles attended the Low Carbon Prosperity Summit.	
28 March – 6 April 2011	Portugal; Spain; Morocco	Lisbon, Madrid, Seville, Rabat	Accompanied by the Duchess of Cornwall. The trip's main goal was to promote trade and investment opportunities and increase cooperation on climate change.	
3–5 May 2011	United States	Washington, D.C.	Prince Charles attended a reception for the British Forces Foundation and United Service Organizations (USO), delivered an address at "The Future of Food" conference at Georgetown University, and met with President Barack Obama at the Oval Office.	
26 October 2011	Saudi Arabia	Riyadh	Prince Charles presented condolences to the Saudi royal family following the death of Sultan bin Abdulaziz, the Crown Prince of Saudi Arabia.	
31 October – 9 November 2011	Kuwait; Qatar; South Africa; Tanzania		Prince Charles attended events to mark the 50th anniversary of independence and 20th anniversary of liberation in Kuwait. He was joined by the Duchess of Cornwall in South Africa and Tanzania, and they marked the 50th anniversary of Tanzania's independence.	
20–27 March 2012	Norway; Sweden; Denmark		The Prince of Wales and the Duchess of Cornwall toured the three Scandinavian countries at the request of the UK government. The visit started in Norway (Oslo & Bergen), continued in Sweden (Stockholm) and concluded in Denmark (Copenhagen & Elsinore).	King Harald V King Carl XVI Gustaf; Queen Margrethe II
20–23 May 2012	Canada	Saint John, Toronto, Regina	The Prince and the Duchess toured Canada at the request of the Canadian government to mark the Queen's Diamond Jubilee and Victoria Day.	
3–12 November 2012	Papua New Guinea; Australia; New Zealand	Longreach, Melbourne, Adelaide, Hobart, Sydney, Canberra, Auckland, Wellington, Manawatū, Christchurch	The Prince and the Duchess toured the countries to mark the Queen's Diamond Jubilee.	
12–13 March 2013	Jordan	Amman, Ar-Ramtha, Jerash	The Prince and the Duchess toured museums and schools. Charles visited King Hussein Mosque and the couple travelled to the Syrian border and met with Syrian refugees.	Abdullah II of Jordan
13–15 March 2013	Qatar	Doha	Among the places visited by the couple were the Museum of Islamic Art and Katara Cultural Village.	
15–16 March 2013	Saudi Arabia	Riyadh	Charles and Camilla visited the Consultative Assembly of Saudi Arabia.	
17–18 March 2013	Oman	Muscat, Nizwa	The couple met with the locals while touring the Nizwa Fort.	Qaboos bin Said
29–30 April 2013	The Netherlands	Amsterdam	The Prince and the Duchess attended the inauguration of Willem-Alexander, King of the Netherlands, as well as the preceding celebrations in honour of the departing Queen Beatrix.	
28–30 May 2013	Armenia	Yerevan, Vagarshapat, Garni	Prince Charles headed to Yerevan's famous Matenadaran museum of ancient Armenian manuscripts on his arrival at the Zvartnots international airport. Charles met President Serzh Sarkisian and with leader of the Armenian Orthodox Church, Catholicos Karekin II. Charles attended a series of charitable events dedicated to the preservation of Armenian cultural heritage, including a concert and dinner.	
6–14 November 2013	India,Sri Lanka	Dehradun, New Delhi, Mumbai, Pune, Kochi, Colombo	The Prince and the Duchess undertook a broad range of engagements to promote the strong UK-India partnership in key areas such as conservation, education, growing business links, women's empowerment and training. In Sri Lanka, the Prince of Wales officially represented Queen Elizabeth II at the Commonwealth Heads of Government Meeting (CHOGM) in Colombo. The couple attended the official opening ceremony and a dinner, hosted by The Prince, for Commonwealth Heads of Government.	
15 December 2013	South Africa	Qunu	The Prince represented Queen Elizabeth II at the state funeral of Nelson Mandela.	
17–19 February 2014	Saudi Arabia	Riyadh	As part of a tour of the Gulf, the Prince visited Riyadh and met with Minister of Foreign Affairs Prince Saud al Faisal, Second Deputy Prime Minister Prince Muqrin bin Abdulaziz, National Guard Minister Prince Miteb bin Abdullah, Deputy Foreign Affairs Minister Prince Abdulaziz bin Abdullah, Saudi Commission for Tourism and Antiquities President Prince Sultan bin Salman, Saudi Ambassador to London Prince Mohammed bin Nawaf, Sheikh Khalid Alireza and Prince Alwaleed bin Talal. He also attended the Janadriyah cultural festival where he wore traditional Saudi dress and participated in a sword dance.	
19–21 February 2014	Qatar	Doha	As part of a tour of the Gulf, the Prince visited the Museum of Islamic Art, the National Heritage Library and the Anglican Centre at Christian Complex in Doha. He also met with Foreign Affairs Minister Dr Khaled bin Mohammed Al Attiyah.	
21 February 2014	United Arab Emirates	Abu Dhabi	As part of a tour of the Gulf, the Prince called upon Crown Prince Mohammed bin Zayed Al Nahyan in Abu Dhabi.	
21 February 2014	Bahrain	Manama	As part of a tour of the Gulf, the Prince called upon King Hamad at Bustan Palace, Manama.	
18–21 May 2014	Canada	Halifax, Pictou, Charlottetown, Winnipeg	The Prince and the Duchess conducted an official tour of Canada, visiting Nova Scotia, Prince Edward Island and Manitoba. In Halifax, they met with Lieutenant Governor John Grant, attended a Victoria Day Military Family Festival and visited Halifax Public Gardens, Halifax Seaport Farmers' Market and the Canadian Museum of Immigration. In Pictou, they visited Hector Heritage Quay and met with Premier Stephen McNeil. In Charlottetown, the Prince and Duchess attended a Victoria Day celebration at Province House, where they also joined a Youth Parliament debate, and met with Premier Robert Ghiz. They also visited the Confederation Centre of the Arts, the Centre for Applied Science and Technology, the Cornwall United Church and Bonshaw Provincial Park. In Winnipeg, the Prince and Duchess attended a reception for Outstanding Canadians at Government House hosted by Lieutenant Governor Philip Lee, and visited the Pavilion Gallery Museum. The Prince also received Prime Minister Stephen Harper, representatives from the Royal Winnipeg Rifles and the Air Reserve of Canada, and held an investiture at the Manitoba Legislature.	
31 May 2014	Romania	Bucharest	The Prince called upon President Traian Băsescu at Cotroceni Palace and received an Honorary Doctorate at the University of Bucharest.	
5–6 June 2014	France	Ranville, Bayeux	The Prince and the Duchess joined the Queen and the Duke of Edinburgh to mark the 70th anniversary of the D-Day landings in Normandy. They attended Royal British Legion services of remembrance in Bayeux Cathedral and at Bayeux Commonwealth War Graves Cemetery, visited HMS Richmond and attended the international commemoration service at Colleville-Montgomery beach and a ceremony of remembrance at Juno Beach Centre, Courseulles-sur-Mer. They also met with President François Hollande, Prime Minister Manuel Valls and Prime Minister of Canada Stephen Harper.	
28 October – 2 November 2014	Colombia	Bogotá, Meta, Cartagena	The Prince and the Duchess paid an official visit to Colombia and were hosted by President Juan Manuel Santos. They visited the Peace and Reconciliation Centre in Bogota, Chiribiquete National Park, and, in Cartagena, the Gold Museum, National Coastguard and HMS Argyll and the Prince also attended the "Health of the Oceans" conference at the Naval Museum.	
2–5 November 2014	Mexico	Mexico City, Real del Monte, Campeche, Monterrey	The Prince and the Duchess paid an official visit to Mexico and visited the capital and the states of Hidalgo, Campeche and Nuevo León. In Real del Monte, they visited the English Cemetery, attended the traditional Day of the Dead festivities and visited the Pasty Museum to celebrate Real del Monte's Cornish heritage. In Mexico City, they met with President Enrique Peña Nieto and attended the launch of the Year of the United Kingdom in Mexico 2015. In Campeche, the Prince visited Edzná archaeological site and Petenes Mangrove Biosphere Reserve. In Monterrey, the Prince and Duchess visited Fundidora Park, the Science Museum, travelled by canal through the city centre and opened the joint United Kingdom and Canadian consulate.	
24 January 2015	Saudi Arabia	Riyadh	The Prince paid condolences on behalf of the Queen to King Salman following the death of the late King, Abdullah.	
7–9 February 2015	Jordan	Amman, Al Mafraq	As part of his Middle East tour, the Prince visited Jordan and met with King Abdullah II, Prince Ghazi bin Muhammad and Prince Hassan bin Talal. He met Iraqi Christian faith leaders resident in Amman and visited the Zaatari refugee camp at Al Mafraq, accompanied by UK International Development Secretary Justine Greening.	
9–10 February 2015	Kuwait	Kuwait City	As part of his Middle East tour, the Prince visited Kuwait and met with Amir Sabah Al-Ahmad Al-Jaber Al-Sabah, Crown Prince Nawaf Al-Ahmad Al-Jaber Al-Sabah and Sheikh Nasser Al-Mohammed Al-Sabah. The Prince visited HMS Dauntless at port in Kuwait City.	
10–12 February 2015	Saudi Arabia	Riyadh	As part of his Middle East tour, the Prince visited Riyadh and met with King Salman, Crown Prince Muqrin bin Abdulaziz, Governor of Riyadh Prince Faisal bin Bander, National Guard Minister Prince Miteb bin Abdullah and Prince Al Waleed bin Talal.	
12 February 2015	Qatar	Doha	As part of his Middle East tour, the Prince called upon Emir Tamim bin Hamad Al Thani in Doha.	
12 February 2015	United Arab Emirates	Abu Dhabi	As part of his Middle East tour, the Prince called upon Crown Prince Mohammed bin Zayed Al Nahyan in Abu Dhabi.	
17–20 March 2015	United States	Washington, D.C., Mount Vernon Louisville	The Prince and the Duchess visited Washington, D.C., Virginia and Kentucky. They met with President Barack Obama at the White House, Governor of Virginia Terry McAuliffe and Governor of Kentucky Steve Beshear. The Prince visited Mount Vernon, viewed a 1297 version of Magna Carta and the Charters of Freedom at the National Archives, attended a "Plastics and the Oceans" Conference held by the International Sustainability Unit, attended a reception at the State Department to mark the 60th anniversary of the Marshall Scholarships, met with the Senate Foreign Relations Committee and Leader of the Senate Mitch McConnell, and received the International Conservation Caucus Foundation Teddy Roosevelt Award. In Louisville, the Prince visited the African American Heritage Centre and attended a roundtable discussion at the Cathedral of the Assumption on the importance of spirituality in encouraging the development of healthy communities, before giving a speech on "the Principles of Harmony."	
23–25 April 2015	Turkey	Istanbul, Çanakkale, Gallipoli	The Prince visited Turkey, accompanied by Prince Harry, to attend commemorations marking the centenary of the Gallipoli landings. He met with President Recep Tayyip Erdoğan and visited HMS Bulwark. The Prince attended the international service at Abide, the Commonwealth and Ireland service at Helles Memorial, the French Service at Morto Bay, the dawn service at ANZAC Cove, the Australian service of thanksgiving at Lone Pine, and the New Zealand service of thanksgiving at Chunuk Bair.	
19–20 May 2015	Ireland	Galway, Oranmore, Gort, Sligo, Drumcliffe, Cliffoney, Mullaghmore	The Prince and the Duchess visited counties Galway and Sligo as part of their visit to Ireland. They met with President Michael D. Higgins, Taoiseach Enda Kenny, Leader of Fianna Fáil Micheál Martin, President of Sinn Féin Gerry Adams and former Taoiseach John Bruton. The Prince visited the National University of Ireland, Galway, the Marine Institute in Oranmore, the Burren, Lough Cutra Castle and Claddagh National School. The Prince and the Duchess attended an ecumenical service of peace and reconciliation in St. Columba's Church in Drumcliffe, and visited Classiebawn Castle and Mullaghmore, where the Prince's great uncle, Lord Mountbatten, was assassinated by the IRA.	
31 May 2015	Romania	Bucharest	The Prince met with President Klaus Iohannis at Cotroceni Palace in Bucharest.	
17 June 2015	Belgium	Hougoumont	The Prince and the Duchess attended a service to remember soldiers who died at the Battle of Waterloo with Princess Astrid of Belgium, Prince Pieter-Christiaan of Orange-Nassau, van Vollenhoven, Henri, Grand Duke of Luxembourg, Prince Nikolaus von Blucher of Prussia, Charles, Prince Napoléon and Charles Wellesley, 9th Duke of Wellington.The Prince also unveiled the new monument at Hougoumont Farm. He also had a meeting with Princess Astrid of Belgium.	
4–10 November 2015	New Zealand	Wellington, Dunedin, Nelson, Westport, Hamilton, Auckland, New Plymouth	The Prince and the Duchess conducted an official tour of New Zealand during which they met with Governor-General Lieutenant General Sir Jerry Mateparae, Prime Minister John Key, Leader of the Opposition Andrew Little and Speaker of the New Zealand House of Representatives David Carter. They laid wreaths at the National War Memorial, attended a reception with members of parliament at Government House, Wellington, and attended the All Blacks' Rugby World Cup victory parade on the forecourt of Parliament. In Dunedin, the Prince visited Tawa College and Toitu Otago Settlers' Museum. The Prince and the Duchess visited the market and a winery in Nelson and the Prince visited the New Zealand Defence Force in Westport. They visited Turangawaewae Marae in Hamilton, attended a reception for the Prince's Charities at Government House, Auckland, and attended a garden party at Pukekura Park in New Plymouth. The Prince also visited the Spirit of New Zealand training vessel at Prince's Wharf, Auckland.	
10–15 November 2015	Australia	Adelaide, Barossa Valley, Sydney, Canberra, Albany, Perth	The Prince and the Duchess conducted an official tour of Australia, visiting South Australia, New South Wales, the Australian Capital Territory and Western Australia. In Adelaide, they met with Governor-General General Sir Peter Cosgrove, Governor of South Australia Hieu Van Le and Premier Jay Weatherill, and visited the Barossa Valley wine region. In Canberra, they attended the Remembrance Day national ceremony at the Australian War Memorial and visited the Australian Security Intelligence Organisation, the National Museum of Australia and the National Arboretum. The Prince also met with Prime Minister Malcolm Turnbull and Leader of the Opposition Bill Shorten. In Sydney, the Prince and the Duchess visited the New South Wales Mounted Police Unit, attended a reception at Government House given by Governor of New South Wales General David Hurley, and attended a dinner at Admiralty House given by the Governor-General. In Western Australia, the Prince and the Duchess visited a winery and the Albany Agricultural Show and attended receptions in Perth given by Governor of Western Australia Kerry Sanderson. The Prince opened the State Buildings in Perth and, with the Duchess, visited Kings Park.	
26–28 November 2015	Malta	St. Julians, Valletta, Ta' Qali, Vittoriosa, Mellieha, Zejtun, Mdina	The Prince and the Duchess visited Malta to attend the Commonwealth Heads of Government Meeting with the Queen and the Duke of Edinburgh. The Prince met with President Marie-Louise Coleiro Preca, Prime Minister Dr Joseph Muscat, President of Sri Lanka Maithripala Sirisena, Prime Minister of Canada Justin Trudeau and Commonwealth Secretary-General Kamalesh Sharma. The Prince attended many meetings and receptions, including for the Prince of Wales's International Sustainability Unit, the Prince's Trust International and the Special Executive Session on Climate Action.	
29 November – 1 December 2015	France	Paris	The Prince visited France to attend the 21st United Nations Conference of the Parties on Climate Change (COP21) in Paris.	
14–16 March 2016	Croatia	Zagreb, Osijek	During their tour of the Balkans, the Prince and the Duchess visited Zagreb and Osijek. They met with President Kolinda Grabar-Kitarović, who hosted a dinner in their honour at the Presidential Palace, and Prime Minister Tihomir Oreškovic. They also met with local community leaders involved in a regional peacebuilding and reconciliation initiative in Osijek.	
16–18 March 2016	Serbia	Belgrade, Novi Sad, Sremski Karlovci	During their tour of the Balkans, the Prince and the Duchess visited Belgrade and Vojvodina. They met with President Tomislav Nikolić and Prime Minister Aleksandar Vučić, who hosted a dinner in their honour. They also met with Crown Prince Alexander and Princess Katherine at the Royal Palace in Belgrade and the Patriarch of the Serbian Orthodox Church, Irinej Gavrilovic. They visited the Commonwealth War Graves Commission cemetery in Belgrade, Kalmejdan Fortress and St. Sava Cathedral, and attended a reception to mark British women on the Serbian Front Line in World War I and the UK-Serbia bilateral relationship, given by the Speaker of the Serbian Parliament, Maja Gojkovic. They later visited Novi Sad and Sremski Karlovci.	
18 March 2016	Montenegro	Podgorica, Cetinje	During their tour of the Balkans, the Prince and the Duchess visited Podgorica and Cetinje. They met with President Filip Vujanović, Prime Minister Milo Đukanović and Deputy Prime Minister Duško Marković. They also visited a cultural heritage festival at Vladin Dom Museum in Cetinje.	
18–19 March 2016	Kosovo	Pristina, Prizren	During their tour of the Balkans, the Prince and the Duchess visited Pristina and Prizren. They met with President of the Republic of Kosovo Atifete Jahjaga and attended an act of remembrance at the Missing Persons Memorial in Pristina. The Prince laid a wreath at the Kosovo Force and United Kingdom Memorials to the Fallen at the Kosovo Force Headquarters in Pristina. He also visited the Church of Our Lady of Perpetual Succour, St. George's Serbian Orthodox Church and the Sinan Pasha Mosque in Prizren.	
25 May 2016	Ireland	Donegal, Letterkenny, Churchill	At the end of a visit to Northern Ireland, the Prince and the Duchess spent a day in County Donegal in the Republic of Ireland. They visited Donegal Castle, were hosted at a reception at Letterkenny Institute of Technology by Minister of Foreign Affairs and Trade Charles Flanagan, and visited Glenveagh National Park.	
30 May – 1 June 2016	Romania	Bucharest, Viscri	The Prince met with President Klaus Iohannis, Prime Minister Dacian Cioloș and Crown Princess Margareta and Prince Radu at Elisabeta Palace. The Prince also launched a training centre in Viscri, Brasov County.	
1 July 2016	France	Thiepval, Beaumont-Hamel	The Prince and the Duchess visited France to attend events marking the centenary of the Battle of the Somme. They attended the UK national commemorative service at the Thiepval Memorial with President François Hollande, the Duke and Duchess of Cambridge and Prince Harry, the Somme Association service of commemoration at Ulster Memorial Tower, and the Canadian national ceremony of remembrance at the Beaumont-Hamel Newfoundland Memorial.	
15 September 2016	France	Longueval	The Prince visited France to attend the New Zealand national service of commemoration marking the centenary of the Battle of the Somme at Caterpillar Valley Commonwealth War Graves Cemetery.	
30 September 2016	Israel	Jerusalem	The Prince represented the Queen at the state funeral of Shimon Peres (former President of Israel).	
4–6 November 2016	Oman	Muscat, Misfat Al Abryeen, Ras Al Shajar	During their tour of the Gulf, the Prince and the Duchess visited Muscat and Ad Dakhiliyah. They attended a cultural arrival at the Palace Boulevard, Muscat, where they were received by Sayyid Haitham bin Tariq bin Taimur Al Said. They visited the National Museum of Oman and were hosted to dinner by Sultan Qaboos. The Prince also visited the old village of Misfat Al Abryeen and Ras Al Shajar Nature Reserve.	
6–8 November 2016	United Arab Emirates	Abu Dhabi, Bu Tinah Island, Masdar City, Al Ain, Dubai, Sharjah	During their tour of the Gulf, the Prince and the Duchess visited the emirates of Abu Dhabi, Dubai and Sharjah. They visited Sheikh Zayed Grand Mosque in Abu Dhabi and attended a cultural celebration at Al Jahili Fort in Al Ain hosted by Crown Prince Mohammed bin Zayed Al Nahyan. The Prince also visited Bu Tinah Island and Masdar City. The Prince later visited the site of Expo 2020 and met with Vice President and Prime Minister Mohammed bin Rashid Al Maktoum in Dubai and Ruler of Sharjah Sultan bin Mohammed Al Qasimi in Sharjah.	
8–11 November 2016	Bahrain	Manama	During their tour of the Gulf, the Prince and the Duchess visited Manama and met with King Hamad, Crown Prince Salman and Prime Minister Prince Khalifa bin Salman Al Khalifa. They the visited the Old Post Office Museum, where they unveiled commemorative stamps marking the 200th anniversary of the bilateral relationship between Bahrain and the United Kingdom, the Old Souk, Krishna Temple, Al-Fateh Grand Mosque and the National Museum. The Prince also visited HMS Middleton and attended a Remembrance Day service at the British Embassy.	
29–31 March 2017	Romania	Bucharest	The Prince visited Bucharest and met with President Klaus Iohannis, Prime Minister Sorin Grindeanu, Crown Princess Margareta and Prince Radu, and Patriarch Daniel of the Romanian Orthodox Church.	
31 March – 5 April 2017	Italy	Florence, Venice, Naples, Amatrice, Rome	The Prince and the Duchess visited Tuscany, Veneto, Campania and Lazio. They visited the British Institute of Florence, attended a service of remembrance at the Commonwealth War Graves Commission cemetery in Montecchio Precalcino, visited the earthquake site at Amatrice, visited the British School at Rome and attended a plenary discussion on the East Africa famine at the United Nations Food and Agriculture Organization. The Prince also met with President Sergio Mattarella and Prime Minister Paolo Gentiloni.	
4 April 2017	Vatican City	Vatican City	The Prince and the Duchess met with Pope Francis and Cardinal Secretary of State Pietro Parolin. They also attended a meeting on climate change and visited the English College.	
5–6 April 2017	Austria	Vienna	The Prince and the Duchess met with President Alexander Van der Bellen, The Prince also met Chancellor Christian Kern, visited the Musikverein and attended a meeting at the Organization for Security and Co-operation in Europe.	
9 April 2017	France	Vimy	The Prince represented the Queen at a commemorative service to mark the centenary of the Battle of Vimy Ridge.	
10–12 May 2017	Ireland	Dublin, Kilkenny, Thomastown, Curragh	The Prince and the Duchess visited counties Dublin and Kilkenny. The Prince with President Michael D. Higgins and Taoiseach Enda Kenny, visited Kilkenny Castle, and participated in an act of remembrance at Glasnevin Cemetery in Dublin.	
29–31 May 2017	Romania	Cluj-Napoca, Viscri	The Prince received an Honorary Doctorate at Babeș-Bolyai University in Cluj-Napoca and visited Viscri.	
29 June – 1 July 2017	Canada	Iqaluit, Trenton, Wellington, Ottawa	The Prince and the Duchess visited Nunavut and Ontario. They visited the Legislative Assembly in Iqaluit and Canadian Forces Base Trenton, opened the Canadian History Hall at the Canadian History Museum in Ottawa and attended the Canada Day celebrations at Parliament Hill to mark the 150th anniversary of the confederation of Canada. The Prince also met with Governor-General David Johnston and Prime Minister Justin Trudeau.	
31 July 2017	Belgium	Passendale	The Prince represented the Queen at the centenary commemorations of the Battle of Passchendaele at Tyne Cot Cemetery, West Flanders.	
4–5 October 2017	Malta	Valletta, St. Julian's	The Prince attended the 75th anniversary commemoration of the awarding of the George Cross to Malta and met with Prime Minister Joseph Muscat.	
30 October – 2 November 2017	Singapore	Singapore	The Prince and the Duchess visited Singapore and met with President Halimah Yacob and Prime Minister Lee Hsien Loong.	
2 November 2017	Brunei	Brunei	The Prince and the Duchess visited Brunei and met with Sultan Hassanal Bolkiah.	
2–8 November 2017	Malaysia	Kuala Lumpur, Taiping, Kuala Kangsar, Sarawak, George Town	On his first visit to Malaysia, the Prince and the Duchess visited Kuala Lumpur, Perak, Sarawak and Penang to celebrate 60 years of British-Malaysian diplomatic relations. They met with Yang di-Pertuan Agong Muhammad V and Sultan of Perak Nazrin Shah, and the Prince visited the Taiping War Cemetery.	
8–9 November 2017	India	New Delhi	The Prince and the Duchess visited Delhi and met with Prime Minister Narendra Modi. The Prince attended an event marking 2017 United Kingdom India Year of Culture and laid a wreath at India Gate.	
17–19 November 2017	Antigua and Barbuda	St. George, Codrington	The Prince visited the islands of Antigua and Barbuda and visited communities affected by Hurricane Irma. He also met with Governor-General Sir Rodney Williams and Prime Minister Gaston Browne.	
18 November 2017	British Virgin Islands	Beef Island, Road Town	The Prince visited Beef Island and Tortola and visited communities affected by Hurricane Irma. He also met with Governor Gus Jaspert and Premier Orlando Smith.	
19 November 2017	Dominica	Roseau	The Prince visited Dominica and visited communities affected by Hurricane Maria. He also met with President Charles Savarin and Prime Minister Roosevelt Skerrit.	
16 December 2017	Romania	Bucharest	The Prince represented the Queen at the funeral of King Michael.	
4–10 April 2018	Australia	Brisbane, Gold Coast, Bundaberg, Lady Elliot Island, Cairns, Mossman Gorge, Nhulunbuy, Yirrkala, Darwin	On his sixteenth visit to Australia, the Prince and the Duchess visited Queensland and the Northern Territory. The Prince opened the 2018 Commonwealth Games on behalf of the Queen. The Prince met with Governor-General General Sir Peter Cosgrove, Governor of Queensland Paul De Jersey, Prime Minister Malcolm Turnbull, Leader of the Opposition Bill Shorten, Chief Minister of the Northern Territory Michael Gunner and Governor-General of New Zealand Dame Patsy Reddy. The Prince also visited HMAS Cairns, the Royal Flying Doctor Service Cairns Base and met with indigenous elders and rangers at Mount Nhulun.	
7 April 2018	Vanuatu	Port Vila	The Prince met with President Tallis Obed Moses and was made an honorary high chief.	
25 April 2018	France	Villers-Bretonneux	The Prince attended an Anzac Day service at the Australian National Memorial in Villers-Bretonneux.	
7–9 May 2018	France	Nice, Èze, Lyon	The Prince and the Duchess visited the memorial for the victims of the 2016 terrorist attack in Nice and attended a VE Day commemoration ceremony in Lyon.	
9–11 May 2018	Greece	Athens, Knossos, Archanes	The Prince and the Duchess visited Athens and Crete. The Prince laid a wreath at Memorial of the Unknown Soldier in Syntagma Square, Athens, and met with President Prokopis Pavlopoulos, Prime Minister Alexis Tsipras, Leader of the Opposition Kyriakos Mitsotakis and Archbishop of Athens and All Greece Ieronymos II. The Prince also visited the Commonwealth War Graves Commission cemetery at Phaleron and HMS Echo.	
30–31 May 2018	Romania	Bucharest, Viscri	The Prince met with President Klaus Iohannis, Prime Minister Viorica Dancila and Margareta, Custodian of the Crown of Romania.	
14–15 June 2018	Ireland	Cork, Caherdaniel, Tralee, Killarney	The Prince and the Duchess visited counties Cork and Kerry. They visited the English Market in Cork, the ancestral home of Daniel O'Connell, Siamsa Tíre and Killarney National Park. The Prince met with Tánaiste Simon Coveney, the President and Vice President of Sinn Féin, Mary Lou McDonald and Michelle O'Neill, and Leader of Fianna Fáil Micheál Martin.	
31 October – 2 November 2018	Gambia	Banjul, Serekunda	The Prince and the Duchess met with President Adama Barrow and visited the Commonwealth War Graves Commission cemetery in Fajara.	
2–6 November 2018	Ghana	Accra, Kumasi	The Prince and the Duchess visited Accra and the Ashanti region. The Prince met with President Nana Akufo-Addo, Okyenhene Osagyefuo Amoatia Ofori Panin and Asantehene Otumfuo Nana Osei Tutu II, visited the Commonwealth War Graves Commission cemetery in Accra and inaugurated the Prince of Wales Park at Kwame Nkrumah University of Science and Technology, Kumasi.	
6–8 November 2018	Nigeria	Abuja, Lagos	The Prince and the Duchess visited Abuja and Lagos. The Prince met with President Muhammadu Buhari, People's Democratic Party Leader Atiku Abubakar and traditional rulers, and visited the Commonwealth War Graves Commission cemetery in Abuja. A planned visit to Jos was cancelled due to violence in the region.	
5 December 2018	United States of America	Washington, D.C.	The Prince represented the Queen at the state funeral of former President George H. W. Bush.	
17–24 March 2019	Barbados	Bridgetown	As part of their Commonwealth tour of the Caribbean, the Prince and the Duchess visited Barbados, during which the Prince laid a wreath at the Cenotaph in Bridgetown, presented a new colour to the Barbados Coast Guard and met Governor-General Dame Sandra Mason and Prime Minister Mia Mottley.	
17 March 2019	St. Lucia	Vieux Fort	As part of his Commonwealth tour of the Caribbean, the Prince visited St. Lucia and met Governor-General Sir Neville Cenac and Prime Minister Allen Chastanet.	
20 March 2019	St. Vincent and the Grenadines	Kingstown	As part of their Commonwealth tour of the Caribbean, the Prince and the Duchess visited St. Vincent and the Grenadines and met Governor-General Sir Frederick Ballantyne and Prime Minister Ralph Gonsalves.	
21 March 2019	St. Kitts and Nevis	Basseterre, Charlestown	As part of their Commonwealth tour of the Caribbean, the Prince and the Duchess visited St. Kitts and Nevis and met Governor-General Sir Tapley Seaton and Prime Minister Timothy Harris.	
23 March 2019	Grenada	St. George's	As part of their Commonwealth tour of the Caribbean, the Prince and the Duchess visited Grenada and met Governor-General Dame Cécile La Grenade and Prime Minister Keith Mitchell.	
24–27 March 2019	Cuba	Havana	The Prince and the Duchess were the first members of the British royal family to visit Cuba. During the visit, they laid a wreath at the José Martí Memorial in Havana and met President Miguel Díaz-Canel.	
27–28 March 2019	Cayman Islands	George Town, Little Cayman	As part of their Commonwealth tour of the Caribbean, the Prince and the Duchess visited Grand Cayman and Little Cayman and met Governor Martyn Roper and Premier Alden McLaughlin.	
7–10 May 2019	Germany	Berlin, Leipzig, Munich, Glonn	The Prince and the Duchess visited Berlin, Saxony and Bavaria and met President Frank-Walter Steinmeier, Chancellor Angela Merkel, Minister-President of Saxony Michael Kretschmer and Minister-President of Bavaria Markus Söder.	
20–21 May 2019	Ireland	Dublin, Enniskerry, Kilbride, Glendalough	The Prince and the Duchess visited Dublin and County Wicklow and met President Michael D. Higgins.	
6 June 2019	France	Bayeux	The Prince and the Duchess attended services in Bayeux Cathedral and at the Commonwealth War Graves Commission Cemetery in Bayeux to commemorate the 75th anniversary of the Normandy landings on D-Day.	
21 September 2019	The Netherlands	Arnhem, Driel, Oosterbeek	The Prince attended events with Princess Beatrix to commemorate the 75th anniversary of Operation Market Garden.	
13 October 2019	Vatican City	Vatican City	The Prince attended the canonisation of Cardinal Newman and met Pope Francis.	
22–23 October 2019	Japan	Tokyo	The Prince represented the Queen at the enthronement of Emperor Naruhito at the Imperial Palace in Tokyo. He also met Deputy Prime Minister Tarō Asō and visited the Wales rugby team for the 2019 Rugby World Cup.	
13–14 November 2019	India	New Delhi, Mumbai	On his tenth visit to India, the Prince met President Ram Nath Kovind, attended a remembrance service at the Delhi War Cemetery, visited a Sikh gurdwara and attended meetings in Mumbai.	
17–23 November 2019	New Zealand	Auckland, Waitangi, Paihia, Kerikeri, Tuahiwi, Christchurch, Lincoln	On his tenth visit to New Zealand, the Prince and the Duchess toured the North and South Islands and met Governor-General Dame Patsy Reddy, Prime Minister Jacinda Ardern and Leader of the Opposition Simon Bridges. The Prince also presented a new colour to the Royal New Zealand Air Force on behalf of the Queen, and visited Waitangi Treaty Grounds, the site of ChristChurch Cathedral and Christchurch Botanic Gardens.	
23–25 November 2019	Solomon Islands	Honiara	The Prince held an investiture, addressed the Parliament of the Solomon Islands and met Governor-General the Rev David Vunagi and Prime Minister Manasseh Sogavare during his visit.	

=== 2020s ===
Date	Country	Areas visited	Details	Host
12 January 2020	Oman	Muscat	The Prince paid condolences on behalf of the Queen to Sultan Haitham bin Tariq following the death of the late Sultan, Qaboos bin Said.	
22 January 2020	Switzerland	Davos	The Prince attended the World Economic Forum in Davos and met environmental activist Greta Thunberg.	
22–24 January 2020	Israel	Tel Aviv, Jerusalem	The Prince attended the World Holocaust Forum, met with President Reuven Rivlin and visited the tomb of his grandmother, Princess Alice of Greece and Denmark.	
24 January 2020	Palestine	Bethlehem	The Prince visited Bethlehem, including the birthplace of Christ, and met with the President of the Palestinian National Authority, Mahmoud Abbas.	
4 October 2020	Kuwait	Kuwait City	The Prince paid condolences on behalf of the Queen to Amir Nawaf Al-Ahmad Al-Jaber Al-Sabah following the death of the late Amir, Sabah al-Ahmad al-Jaber al-Sabah.	
14–15 November 2020	Germany	Berlin	The Prince and the Duchess met President Frank-Walter Steinmeier, laid a wreath at the Neue Wache and attended the central remembrance ceremony on the National Day of Mourning at the Bundestag.	
24–25 March 2021	Greece	Athens	The Prince and the Duchess visited Athens to attend events marking the 200th anniversary of the independence of Greece, including a parade in Syntagma Square. They visited the National Art Gallery of Greece and met with President Katerina Sakellaropoulou, who hosted a dinner in their honour at the Presidential Mansion. The Prince also met with Prime Minister Kyriakos Mitsotakis at the Maximos Mansion, and was awarded the Gold Medal of Athens and met senior business leaders to discuss the "Terra Carta" at Athens City Hall.	
30–31 October 2021	Italy	Rome	The Prince attended the G20 Summit in Rome and attended a dinner hosted by President Sergio Mattarella at the Quirinale Palace.	
16–17 November 2021	Jordan	Amman, Umm Qais	The Prince and the Duchess visited Amman, where they were welcomed by King Abdullah II and Queen Rania of Jordan. They also visited the Al-Maghtas archaeological site and collected water from the Jordan River, the site were Jesus is believed to have been baptised by John the Baptist.	
18–19 November 2021	Egypt	Cairo, Giza, Alexandria	The Prince and the Duchess were welcomed to Cairo by President Abdel Fattah el-Sisi and First Lady Entissar Amer. Among the sites and places visited by the couple were the Giza Pyramid Complex, the Great Sphinx of Giza, Al-Azhar Mosque, and the Bibliotheca Alexandrina.	
29–30 November 2021	Barbados	Bridgetown	The Prince attended the ceremonies held to mark Barbados's transition into a parliamentary republic, which removed the Queen as their head of state. In a speech delivered at the ceremony, the Prince of Wales acknowledged "the appalling atrocity of slavery" in the Caribbean, adding "it forever stains our history".	
24–25 March 2022	Ireland	County Waterford, County Tipperary	The Prince of Wales and the Duchess of Cornwall visited the Republic of Ireland as part of the Platinum Jubilee Tour on behalf of the Queen. In County Waterford, they met with Ukrainians residing in Waterford, and Charles condemned the 2022 Russian invasion of Ukraine. They also visited the Waterford city centre, met with members of the Ukrainian community, toured a selection of museums and learned about the history of Reginald's Tower. In County Tipperary, the couple toured a farmers market in Cahir, and visited Cahir Castle and the Rock of Cashel.	
17–19 May 2022	Canada	St. John's, Ottawa, Yellowknife, Dettah	In St. John's on 17 May, the Prince of Wales and the Duchess of Cornwall participated in moment of reflection and prayer at the Heart Garden with Indigenous leaders and community members, in the spirit of reconciliation. On 18 May, the Prince of Wales was invested as an Extraordinary Commander of the Order of Military Merit by the governor general. The couple later participated in a wreath laying ceremony at the National War Memorial, and met with Canadian Ukrainian organisations and community members. Later, the Prince participated in discussions on employment and sustainability with participants of The Prince's Trust Canada. In the evening, the governor general hosted a reception at Rideau Hall for the couple. RoseAnne Archibald, National Chief of the Assembly of First Nations, appealed directly to the Prince and asked for an apology from the Queen in her capacity as monarch and head of the Church of England for the wrongful acts committed in the past by the Crown and the church in relation to Indigenous peoples. She said that the Prince "acknowledged" failures by Canadian governments in handling the relationship between the Crown and indigenous people, which she said "really meant something". On 19 May, the couple arrived in Yellowknife and Dettah. In Dettah, they visited a Dene First Nation community. The Prince held discussions with local chiefs and elders, and met local food producers at the Prince of Wales Northern Heritage Centre. The Duchess visited Kaw Tay Whee School, and later visited a YWCA transitional housing centre for women and their children. Later, the Prince and the Duchess marked the Jubilee at the Ceremonial Circle with a presentation of various plants and flowers that will be included in the Northwest Territories' Platinum Jubilee Garden.	
25 May 2022	Romania	Bucharest	On 25 May 2022, the Prince of Wales travelled to Bucharest and, along with Margareta, Custodian of the Crown of Romania, visited a centre helping Ukrainian refugees displaced by the 2022 Russian invasion of Ukraine.	
21–24 June 2022	Rwanda	Kigali	In their final trip as the Prince of Wales and the Duchess of Cornwall, they travelled to Kigali, where the Prince represented the Queen at Commonwealth Heads of Government Meeting. The couple also visited the Kigali Genocide Memorial and the Prince toured a church outside Kigali where victims of the Rwandan genocide were buried. The Prince told the CHOGM that the decision as to whether to keep the Queen as head of state, or become a republic, were purely a matter for each member country to decide, and suggested that changes can be made "calmly and without rancour". Charles also expressed "his personal sorrow" at the suffering caused by the slave trade in some of the countries and described acknowledging the wrongs of the past as a necessity for the Commonwealth countries to realise their potential.	

== As King ==
=== 2020s ===
Date	Country	Areas visited	Details	Host
29–31 March 2023	Germany	Berlin, Hamburg	The King and Queen paid a State Visit to Germany. Accompanied by the Queen, the King attended a state banquet hosted by President Steinmeier in Berlin. He also became the first British monarch to address the Bundestag. The King met with Ukrainian refugees as well as a joint German/British military unit. In Hamburg, the King laid a wreath at the St. Nicholas Memorial and visited the Port of Hamburg to focus on green energy.	President Frank-Walter Steinmeier
2–6 June 2023	Romania	Bucharest, Valea Zălanului, Viscri	The King paid an semi-official visit to Romania. He was received at the Cotroceni Palace by President Iohannis, and also travelled to his residences in Valea Zălanului and Viscri.	President Klaus Iohannis
20–22 September 2023	France	Paris, Bordeaux	The King and Queen paid a State Visit to France. Accompanied by the Queen, the King attended a state banquet hosted by President Macron. He also became the first British monarch to address the French Senate. Initially, they were due to visit France before travelling to Germany, but that trip was postponed because of the 2023 French pension reform strikes.	President Emmanuel Macron
31 October–3 November 2023	Kenya	Nairobi, Mombasa	The King and Queen paid a State visit to Kenya. The King and Queen's programme reflected the ways in which Kenya and the United Kingdom were working together, notably to boost mutual prosperity, tackle climate change, promote youth opportunity and employment, advance sustainable development and create a more stable and secure region.	President William Ruto
30 November–1 December 2023	United Arab Emirates	Dubai	The King attended COP28.	
6 June 2024	France	Normandy	The King and Queen attended an event organised by the Ministry of Defence and the Royal British Legion at the British Normandy Memorial to mark the 80th anniversary of D-Day.	President Emmanuel Macron
18–23 October 2024	Australia	Sydney, Canberra	Accompanied by the Queen. The couple's programme recognised Australians excelling in health, arts, culture, and sports, learning about bushfire behaviour and attending a community BBQ in Western Sydney to celebrate the diversity of Australian communities.	Prime Minister Anthony Albanese
24–26 October 2024	Samoa	Apia	The King and Queen paid a state visit to Samoa. The visit celebrated the strong bilateral relationship between Samoa and the UK. They also attended CHOGM 2024.	O le Ao o le Malo Tuimalealiʻifano Vaʻaletoʻa Sualauvi II
27 January 2025	Poland	Oświęcim	The King attended an event to mark the 80th anniversary of the liberation of the Auschwitz concentration camp, regarded as Holocaust Memorial Day.	President Andrzej Duda
7–10 April 2025	Italy	Rome, Ravenna	The King and Queen paid a state visit to the Italian Republic. The visit was part of the UK's post-Brexit "reset" in reinforcing links with European allies. On 9 April, he would meet Italian Prime Minister Giorgia Meloni. He also became the first British monarch to address the Italian Parliament. On April 10, the King and Queen visited various locations in Ravenna before departing Italy.	President Sergio Mattarella
9 April 2025	Vatican City	Vatican City	Accompanied by the Queen, the King undertook a surprise private visit to the Holy See to meet Pope Francis at his Casa Santa Marta home in Vatican City as he was recovering from a bout with pneumonia. The meeting with the pope also occurred on the same day as their 20th wedding anniversary.	Pope Francis
26–27 May 2025	Canada	Ottawa	The King and Queen opened the 45th Parliament of Canada. The visit also served to strengthen the bond between Canada and the monarchy, offering a unique opportunity to deepen understanding of the Crown's role in Canadian democracy.	Prime Minister Mark Carney
22–23 October 2025	Vatican City	Vatican City	The King and Queen paid a State Visit to the Vatican State. Visiting the Holy See they joined Pope Leo XIV in celebrating the Catholic Church's Jubilee Year. During the visit, Charles became first reigning British monarch to pray with a pope publicly since the English Reformation.	Pope Leo XIV
27–30 April 2026	US	Washington, DC, New York, Virginia	The King and Queen paid a State Visit to the United States, where the King addressed the United States Congress becoming only the second British monarch to do so and the first reigning king. This visit marked the 250th anniversary of the United States and celebrated the close ties between the two nations.	President Donald Trump
1–2 May 2026	Bermuda	Hamilton	The King carried out his first visit to Bermuda as well as his first visit to a British Overseas Territory as monarch.	Governor Andrew Murdoch
27–29 October 2026	Bahamas	Nassau, Georgetown, St. John's	The King visited The Bahamas and made a state visit to Guyana. He was accompanied by the Queen on visit to Antigua and Barbuda, where they joined celebrations marking the nation's Independence anniversary and attended CHOGM 2026. This tour celebrated the communities, cultures and nature within the Commonwealth family.	Prime Minister Philip Davis
29–30 October 2026	Guyana	Nassau, Georgetown, St. John's	The King visited The Bahamas and made a state visit to Guyana. He was accompanied by the Queen on visit to Antigua and Barbuda, where they joined celebrations marking the nation's Independence anniversary and attended CHOGM 2026. This tour celebrated the communities, cultures and nature within the Commonwealth family.	President Irfaan Ali
30 October–4 November 2026	Antigua and Barbuda	Nassau, Georgetown, St. John's	The King visited The Bahamas and made a state visit to Guyana. He was accompanied by the Queen on visit to Antigua and Barbuda, where they joined celebrations marking the nation's Independence anniversary and attended CHOGM 2026. This tour celebrated the communities, cultures and nature within the Commonwealth family.	Prime Minister Gaston Browne

=== Upcoming overseas trips ===
Date	Country	Areas to be visited	Details	Host
2027	Spain	TBC	The King and Queen will make a state visit to the Kingdom of Spain.	King Felipe VI
2027	Ireland	TBC	The King and Queen will make a state visit to the Republic.	President Catherine Connolly

== See also ==
- List of state visits received by Charles III
- List of state visits made by Elizabeth II, his predecessor
- List of Commonwealth official trips made by Elizabeth II
- List of official overseas trips made by William, Prince of Wales
- List of official overseas trips made by Catherine, Princess of Wales
- List of official overseas trips made by Prince Harry, Duke of Sussex, and Meghan, Duchess of Sussex
