= State visit by Charles III to the Holy See =

2025 visit by the British monarch

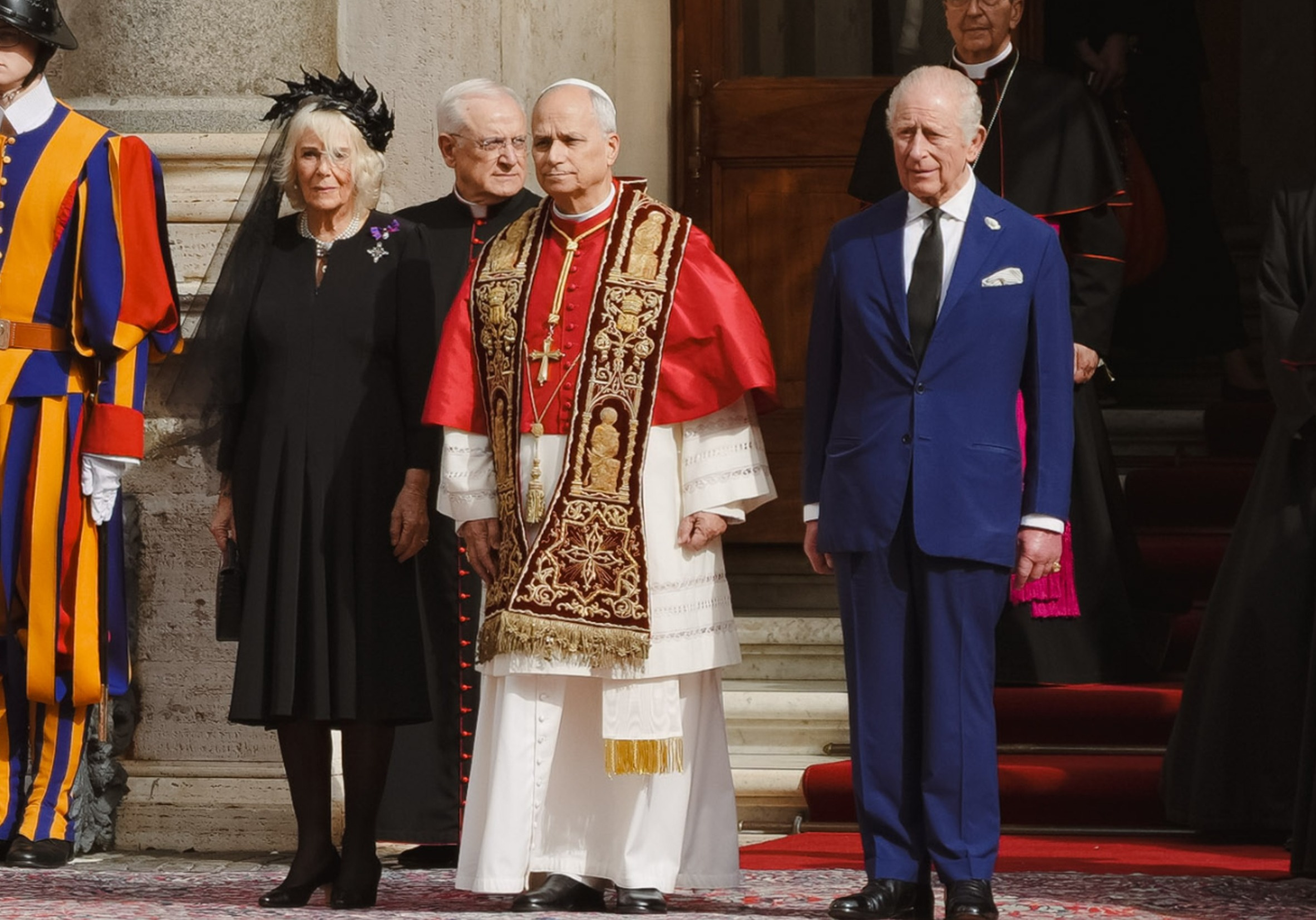
- King Charles III and Queen Camilla with Pope Leo XIV on 23 October 2025.
- Date: 22 to 23 October 2025
- Location: Vatican City
- Type: State visit
- Participants: King Charles III; Queen Camilla

King Charles III of the United Kingdom and his wife Queen Camilla made a state visit to Vatican City on 22 and 23 October 2025.

During this visit, Pope Leo XIV and King Charles III prayed together. This marked the first time a Pope and a British monarch prayed together in the last 500 years.

== Background ==
The King and Queen had originally planned to undertake a state visit to the Holy See in April 2025, alongside their state visit to the Italian Republic. However, due to the declining health of Pope Francis, the Vatican portion was reduced to a small private visit at his bedside. Francis died shortly afterwards, before a longer visit could be arranged.

The rescheduled visit in October was the first time the King had met Pope Leo XIV, who was elected in May and according to Catholic tradition is the 267th successor of St Peter. Buckingham Palace said the trip would "celebrate the ecumenical work by the Church of England and the Catholic Church, reflecting the jubilee year's theme of walking together as pilgrims of hope".

== Visit ==
=== 22 October ===
The King and Queen were formally welcomed by representatives from the Holy See at Rome Ciampino Airport on Wednesday evening.

=== 23 October ===
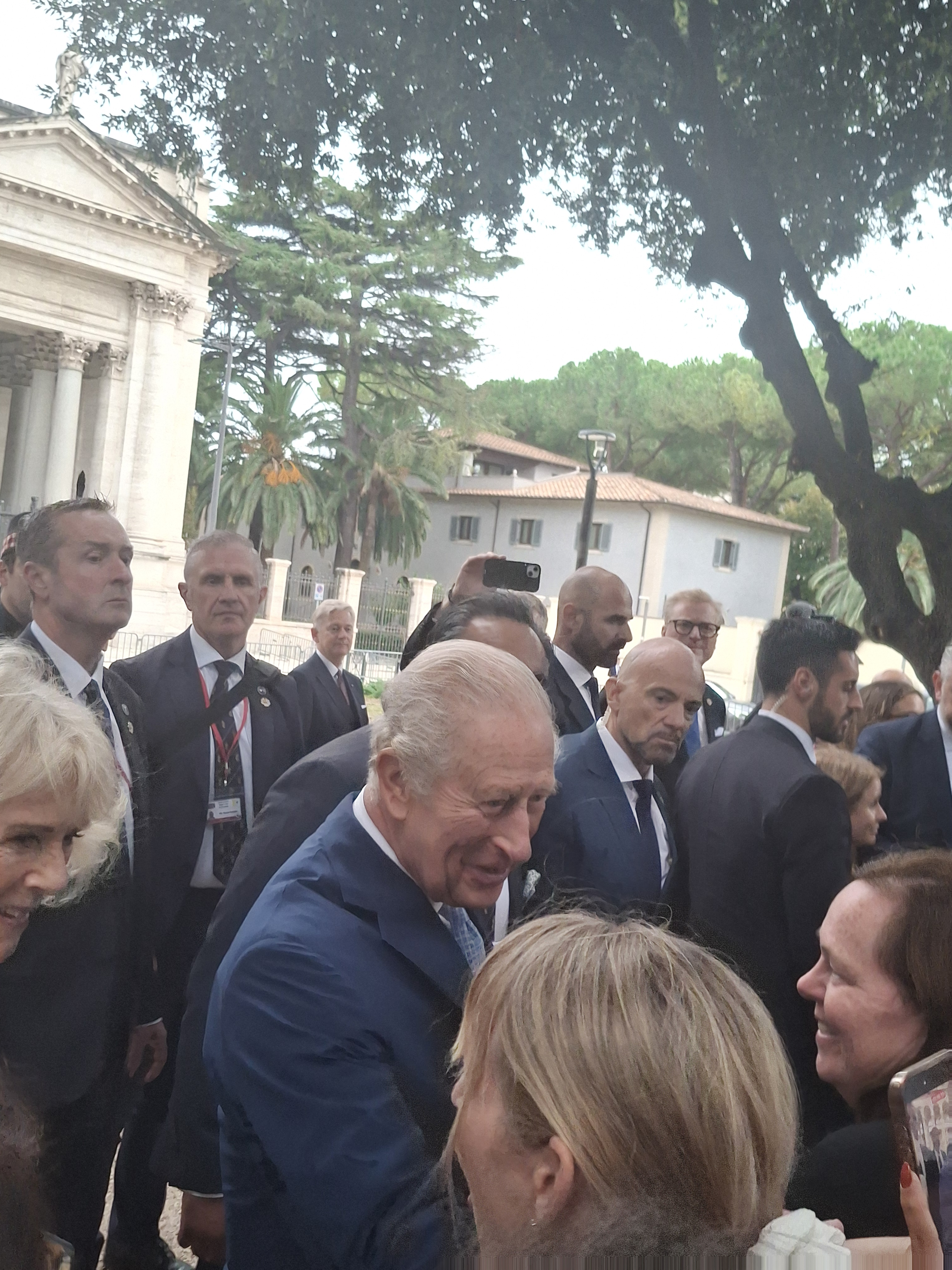
The King shaking hands during his visit to the Basilica of Saint Paul Outside the Walls

On 23 October 2025, the King and Queen had a private audience with Pope Leo XIV in the Apostolic Palace. During the meeting, the King appointed Pope Leo an Honorary Knight Grand Cross of the Order of the Bath, and the Pope in turn awarded the Order of Pope Pius IX, Charles becoming a Knight with Collar and Camilla a Dame Grand Cross. Later, the King and Pope Leo XIV prayed together during an ecumenical service in the Sistine Chapel, marking the joining of hands between the Catholic Church and Church of England in a celebration of ecumenism.

That afternoon, accompanied by the Queen, the King attended a service at the Basilica of Saint Paul Outside the Walls, where he was given the title of "Royal Confrater". In return Leo was awarded the title of Papal Confrater of St. George's Chapel in Windsor Castle. The titles symbolise the growing ecumenical friendship between the Catholic Church and the Anglican Church. Amongst those present there were Abbot Donato Ogliari; Cardinal Archpriest of the Papal Basilica James Michael Harvey; the Archbishop of York and Primate of England, Stephen Cottrell; and the Moderator of the General Assembly of the Church of Scotland, Rosie Frew. The King then attended a garden reception in celebration of the day's ecumenical services at the Pontifical Beda College, and met groups of seminarians from across the Commonwealth, British nationals working in the Vatican, and Commonwealth Ambassadors to the Holy See, while the Queen met with a group of Catholic Sisters representing the International Union of Superiors General (UISG), and expressed her deep admiration for their service to accompany people living in conditions of conflict, poverty, and displacement across the world.

== Commentary ==
Media outlets worldwide have widely emphasised the significant historical importance of this visit, particularly its impact on the relationship between the Roman Catholic Church and the Church of England. The Guardian commented that the King and Pope praying together in the Sistine Chapel was a symbolic act of rapprochement between the Catholic Church and the Church of England after centuries of division. Father Martin Browne, an official of the Dicastery for Promoting Christian Unity, told Vatican News that the King's visit demonstrated the closeness between the Anglican and Catholic churches. AP News suggested the King's visit would mark a historic step in the path of unity between the two churches.

== See also ==
- List of official overseas trips made by Charles III
- Holy See–United Kingdom relations
