= State visit by Charles III to Germany =

2023 visit by the British monarch

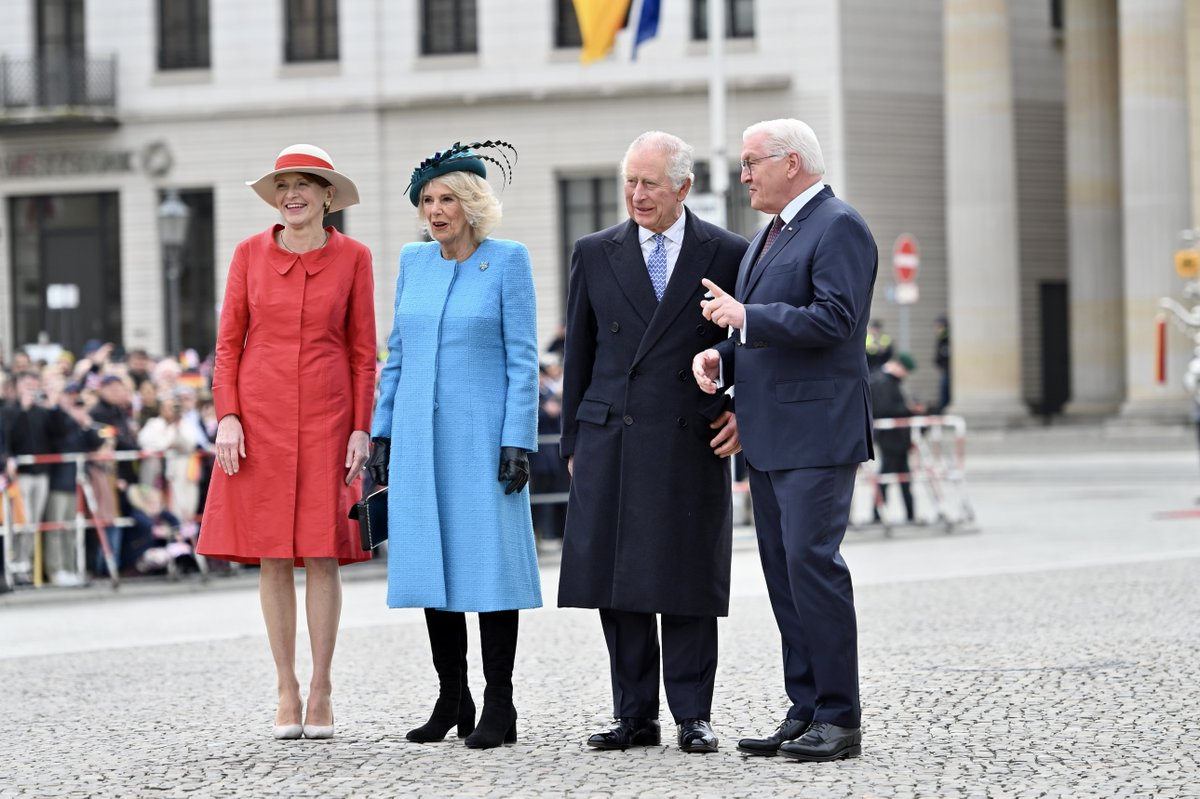
- King Charles III and Queen Camilla with President Steinmeier and Elke Büdenbender at the Brandenburg Gate in Berlin
- Date: 29 to 31 March 2023
- Location: Berlin Hamburg
- Type: State visit
- Participants: King Charles III; Queen Camilla; President Frank-Walter Steinmeier

King Charles III of the United Kingdom and his wife Queen Camilla made a state visit to Germany from 29 to 31 March 2023, hosted by the President of Germany, Frank-Walter Steinmeier and his wife, Elke Büdenbender. It was his first official visit as British monarch on German soil and the first ever state visit carried out during his reign.

== Background ==
The royal couple were originally meant to visit France first, but that state visit was postponed due to the 2023 French pension reform strikes. The aim of the visit to Germany was to showcase the strong bond and friendship between Germany and Britain to strengthen ties that have been strained by Brexit. Charles had visited Germany around 40 times as a prince.

== Visit ==
=== 29 March ===
The King and Queen's arrival at Berlin Brandenburg Airport was marked by a twenty-one gun salute. The royal couple then joined President Frank-Walter Steinmeier and his wife, Elke Büdenbender, for a military ceremony at the Brandenburg Gate in Berlin. Charles then attended a meeting on sustainability at Bellevue Palace and planted a tree as part of the Queen's Green Canopy in tribute to his mother, Queen Elizabeth II. A state banquet was then held in the evening at Bellevue Palace. President Steinmeier described Brexit as a "sad day", but added "Many feared that Brexit could make the Germans and the British drift apart. However this did not happen. Too strong are the ties between our countries".

=== 30 March ===
On the second day, Charles met with Chancellor Olaf Scholz at the Federal Chancellery of Germany. He and Camilla visited the Wittenbergplatz Food Market. Charles then became the first British monarch to address the Bundestag, speaking in both English and German. He subsequently met with Ukrainian refugees at the Tegel Refugee Centre as well as a joint German/British military unit at Finowfurt. He also toured the organic Brodowin Farm. Camilla visited Refugio House in Kreuzberg and met with locals and refugees. She also visited the Komische Oper Berlin.

=== 31 March ===
On the third day, the King and Queen travelled from Berlin Hauptbahnhof to Hamburg and arrived at Hamburg Dammtor station. They visited the Kindertransport Memorial to mark the 85th anniversary of the UK-led rescue mission in 1938 to save 10,000 children by granting them entry to the UK and Camilla laid a rose in memory of the Holocaust victims. They then visited St. Nicholas Church which had been largely destroyed by the bombing of Hamburg in World War II and Charles laid a wreath in memory of those killed in the bombings. They later stopped at Hamburg City Hall and were greeted by the mayor of Hamburg, Peter Tschentscher. Charles then went on a Green Energy boat tour at the Port of Hamburg. Camilla visited the Rudolf Ross Elementary School and the couple attended a reception at the Schuppen 52 warehouse before departing for Britain from Hamburg Airport.

== See also ==
- List of official overseas trips made by Charles III
- State visit by Frank-Walter Steinmeier to the United Kingdom
- Germany–United Kingdom relations
