= List of official overseas trips made by Prince Harry, Duke of Sussex, and Meghan, Duchess of Sussex =

This is a list of official overseas visits and Commonwealth tours made by the Duke and Duchess of Sussex. Prince Harry, as a child, first travelled with his parents on official visits and tours. He later became one of the United Kingdom's most important ambassadors; sometimes the Duke travelled overseas as a representative of the UK. His wife, Meghan, began undertaking official trips upon joining the British royal family in 2018. The Duke and Duchess also toured Commonwealth realms, of which his father is the king, as her representative or as members of the realm's royal family. The Duke and Duchess ceased undertaking engagements in the UK and overseas after stepping down as working members of the royal family in 2020.

== List of official overseas visits ==
Date	Country	Notes
5–10 May 1985	Italy	Prince Harry visited Venice with his parents Charles, Prince of Wales, and Diana, Princess of Wales and brother Prince William.
22–27 October 1991	Canada	Prince Harry made a visit with his family Prince Charles, Diana, and Prince William.
29 July 1993	Germany	Prince Harry visited Bergen-Hohne Training Area with his mother Diana to meet with the Light Dragoons, of which his mother was colonel-in-chief.
23–24 March 1998	Canada	Prince Harry visited Vancouver for public engagements with Prince Charles and Prince William.
February–April 2004	Lesotho	Prince Harry visited on a two-month working trip to raise awareness about AIDS, drought, and poverty. He was hosted by Prince Seeiso of Lesotho. His time in Lesotho would lead to him cofounding the charitable organization, Sentebale, along with Prince Seeiso.
July 2008	Lesotho	Prince Harry met with youngsters at counseling centres.
October 2008	South Africa	Prince Harry and Prince William took part in the Enduro Africa bike trek to raise money for charities.
29–30 May 2009	United States	Prince Harry met with families of some of the victims of 9/11, visited the Harlem Children's Zone, and played polo to raise money for Sentebale.
June 2010	Botswana	Prince Harry and Prince William undertook joint engagements overseas for the first time in June 2010 while touring Southern Africa. The visit to Botswana was on behalf of Tusk Trust, of which Prince William is patron.
June 2010	Lesotho	Prince Harry, along with Prince William, visited projects supported by Sentebale.
June 2010	South Africa	The visit was made in support of the Football Association's bid to host the 2018 FIFA World Cup.
June 2010	Mozambique	Prince Harry visited the HALO Trust, learning about mine clearance in the Tete Province.
2–9 March 2012	Belize	Prince Harry led an official visit as part of Queen Elizabeth II's Diamond Jubilee celebrations.
2–9 March 2012	Bahamas	Prince Harry led an official visit as part of Queen Elizabeth II's Diamond Jubilee celebrations.
2–9 March 2012	Jamaica	Prince Harry led an official visit as part of Queen Elizabeth II's Diamond Jubilee celebrations. He met with Prime Minister Portia Simpson-Miller, who was considering severing ties between Jamaica and its monarchy.
10–12 March 2012	Brazil	Prince Harry then visited Brazil to attend the GREAT Campaign.
27 February–March 2013	Lesotho	Prince Harry visited local centres and saw effects of his charity Sentebable, accompanied by Prince Seeiso.
27 February–March 2013	South Africa	Prince Harry attended a gala dinner for Sentebale, in Johannesburg.
9–15 May 2013	United States	Prince Harry made an official visit to the United States to promote the rehabilitation of injured American and UK troops, as well as to publicise his own charities and support British interests. The tour included engagements in Washington, D.C., Colorado, New York, New Jersey, and Connecticut. He met with survivors of Hurricane Sandy in New Jersey.
August 2013	Angola	Prince Harry visited to see HALO Trust's work there as patron of the trust's 25th Anniversary Appeal.
5–7 October 2013	Australia	Prince Harry's first official visit to the country where he attended the International Fleet Review at Sydney Harbour. He also paid a visit to the Australian SAS HQ in Perth, accompanied by Prime Minister Tony Abbott.
5–7 October 2013	United Arab Emirates	On his way back from Australia to the UK, Harry attended a charity event for Sentebale in Dubai.
May 2014	Estonia	Prince Harry visited Freedom Square in the capital Tallinn as well as attended a reception at the Estonian Parliament and a NATO military exercise.
May 2014	Italy	Prince Harry attended commemorations of the 70th anniversary of the Battle of Monte Cassino, in which Polish, Commonwealth and British troops fought. He also unveiled the British Pavilion at Expo Milano 2015 in Rome at the MAXXI Museum.
23–29 June 2014	Brazil	Prince Harry visited Brasília, Belo Horizonte and São Paulo, to attend environmental, medical, and armed forces events. Also attended two FIFA world cup matches.
23–29 June 2014	Chile	Prince Harry visited Santiago and Valparaíso, meeting with President Michelle Bachelet.
4 August 2014	Belgium	Prince Harry met with families of WWI soldiers in a reception before reading a letter from a fallen soldier in a twilight service at St Symphorien Military Cemetery in Mons.
9 November 2014	Afghanistan	Prince Harry attended Remembrance Sunday Service at Kandahar Air Base, representing Queen Elizabeth II.
18–20 November 2014	Oman	Harry's original plan was to attend the National Day Parade, but due to the illness of the Sultan, the parade was cancelled and Harry's visit became semi-official. He visited the British Embassy, Nizwa Fort, Muttrah souk, and Sultan Qaboos Grand Mosque.
18–20 November 2014	United Arab Emirates	Prince Harry played in the Sentebale Polo Cup in Abu Dhabi in aid of Sentebale.
December 2014	Lesotho	Prince Harry visited Lesotho with Prince Seeiso to see Sentebale's charity work.
6 April 2015	Australia	Before reporting for duty to the Australian Defence Force (ADF), Harry visited the Australian War Memorial in Canberra.
24–25 April 2015	Turkey	Prince Harry joined his father, Prince Charles, to attend commemorations of the centenary of the Gallipoli campaign.
May 2015	Australia	Prince Harry made a farewell walkabout at the Sydney Opera House and visited Macquarie University Hospital.
May 2015	New Zealand	Prince Harry toured Wellington, Invercargill, Stewart Island, Christchurch, Linton, Whanganui, and Auckland.
28 October 2015	United States	Prince Harry carried out one day of engagements in the US. He launched the Invictus Games Orlando 2016 with First Lady Michelle Obama and Second Lady Jill Biden at Fort Belvoir. He later attended an Invictus Games 2016 Board Meeting and a Reception to celebrate the launch at the British Ambassador's Residence. Prior to the reception, Harry met with President Barack Obama in the Oval Office.
November 2015	Lesotho	On 26 November 2015, as patron of Sentebale, Harry travelled to Lesotho to attend the opening of the Mamohato Children's Centre. Two days later Harry played the Sentebale Royal Salute Polo Cup, at Val de Vie Estate in Cape Town, South Africa, fundraising for Sentebale.
30 November–3 December 2015	South Africa	Prince Harry made an official visit to the country where he visited Cape Town, where he met with Archbishop Emeritus Desmond Tutu and presented the Order of the Companions of Honour to the Archbishop on behalf of the Queen. On the day he visited Kruger National Park and Southern African Wildlife College, Kensington Palace released a series of pictures and videos about his conservation work tour in Africa during the summer. In Johannesburg, Harry visited the Nelson Mandela Foundation where he met with Graca Machel and toured the private archives of the Centre for Memory. He also met with President Jacob Zuma at his residence in Pretoria.
19–23 March 2016	Nepal	Prince Harry stayed until the end of March 2016 to help rebuild a secondary school with Team Rubicon UK, and visited a Hydropower Project in central Nepal.
2 May 2016	Canada	As patron of Invictus Games Foundation, Prince Harry attended a day of engagements to launch the Invictus Games 2017 in Toronto on 2 May 2016. He also met with Prime Minister Justin Trudeau.
5–13 May 2016	United States	Prince Harry attended the Invictus Games 2016, where he met competitors and their families and watched all sports competitions. He gave speeches at the opening and closing ceremonies, attended a symposium on Invisible Wounds, with former President George W. Bush and two veterans, and receptions for sponsors, Invictus Games Foundation and Royal Foundation.
30 June–1 July 2016	France	Prince Harry accompanied Prince William and Catherine, Duchess of Cambridge to centenary commemorations for the Battle of the Somme at the Thiepval Memorial in France.
21 July 2016	South Africa	Prince Harry attended the 21st International AIDS Conference in Durban.
20 November–4 December 2016	Antigua and Barbuda	Prince Harry visited the Caribbean on behalf of Queen Elizabeth II and the Foreign Office.
20 November–4 December 2016	Saint Kitts and Nevis	Prince Harry visited the Caribbean on behalf of Queen Elizabeth II and the Foreign Office.
20 November–4 December 2016	Saint Lucia	Prince Harry visited the Caribbean on behalf of Queen Elizabeth II and the Foreign Office.
20 November–4 December 2016	Saint Vincent and the Grenadines	Prince Harry visited the Caribbean on behalf of Queen Elizabeth II and the Foreign Office.
20 November–4 December 2016	Grenada	Prince Harry visited the Caribbean on behalf of Queen Elizabeth II and the Foreign Office.
20 November–4 December 2016	Barbados	Prince Harry visited the Caribbean on behalf of Queen Elizabeth II and the Foreign Office.
20 November–4 December 2016	Guyana	Prince Harry visited the Caribbean on behalf of Queen Elizabeth II and the Foreign Office.
9 April 2017	France	Prince Harry and Prince William attended the centenary commemorations for the Battle of Vimy Ridge.
22–30 September 2017	Canada	As patron of Invictus Games Foundation, he attended opening of the Invictus Games 2017 in Toronto. He also met with United States First Lady Melania Trump.
25–26 October 2017	Denmark	Prince Harry visited projects which help young people in Copenhagen. He also met with Queen Margrethe II.
December 2017	Malawi	Prince Harry spent three weeks in the country with African Parks where he joined a team of volunteers and professionals to carry out one of the largest elephant translocations in history. The effort to repopulate areas decimated due to poaching and habitat loss moved 500 elephants from Liwonde and Majete National Parks to Nkhotakota Wildlife Reserve.
July 2018	Ireland	In their first official visit following their marriage and granting of new titles, the-now Duke and Duchess of Sussex visited Dublin at the request of the British government.
15–31 October 2018	Australia	The Duke and Duchess toured the region around the time of the Invictus Games held in Sydney.
15–31 October 2018	Fiji	The Duke and Duchess toured the region around the time of the Invictus Games held in Sydney.
15–31 October 2018	Tonga	The Duke and Duchess toured the region around the time of the Invictus Games held in Sydney.
15–31 October 2018	New Zealand	The Duke and Duchess toured the region around the time of the Invictus Games held in Sydney.
26–27 November 2018	Zambia	The Duke took part in a commemoration service for Zambian military veterans and attended an event of The Queen's Commonwealth Trust.
14 February 2019	Norway	The Duke visited British servicemen and women in Bardufoss.
23–25 February 2019	Morocco	The Duke and Duchess visited Casablanca, the Atlas Mountains and Rabat. They visited projects centered on the issues of "women's empowerment, girls' education, inclusivity and encouragement of social entrepreneurship".
9 May 2019	Netherlands	The Duke visited The Hague and attended events to mark the official launch of the 2020 Invictus Games.
24 May 2019	Italy	The Duke visited Rome to take part in a fundraising polo match for his charity Sentebale.
3 September 2019	Netherlands	The Duke travelled to Amsterdam to launch Travalyst, an initiative "to encourage sustainable practices in the travel industry".
23 September–2 October 2019	South Africa	The Duke and Duchess, along with their son Archie, visited South Africa at the request of the Foreign and Commonwealth Office. Only Harry would travel to the rest of the region on behalf of the government, as well as a short working visit to Botswana. As President of African Parks and Patron of Rhino Conservation Botswana, Harry raised awareness about wildlife issues and visited the MOD-African Parks. In his capacity as President of the Queen's Commonwealth Trust, he carried out engagements related to socio-economic and environmental challenges. The tour included a walk by Harry in a former minefield in Angola where his mother Diana, Princess of Wales, had walked and raised awareness about before her death. This was followed by a visit to a British military unit in Malawi. Harry also attended the renaming ceremony of an orthopedic centre in Huambo, Angola, which was renamed the Princess Diana Orthopaedic Centre in his mother's honour.
23 September–2 October 2019	Malawi	
23 September–2 October 2019	Angola	
23 September–2 October 2019	Botswana	
2 November 2019	Japan	The Duke of Sussex attended the 2019 Rugby World Cup Final in Yokohama.

== See also ==
- List of state visits made by Elizabeth II
- List of Commonwealth official trips made by Elizabeth II
- List of official overseas trips made by Charles III
