= State visit by Charles III to Italy =

2025 visit by the British monarch

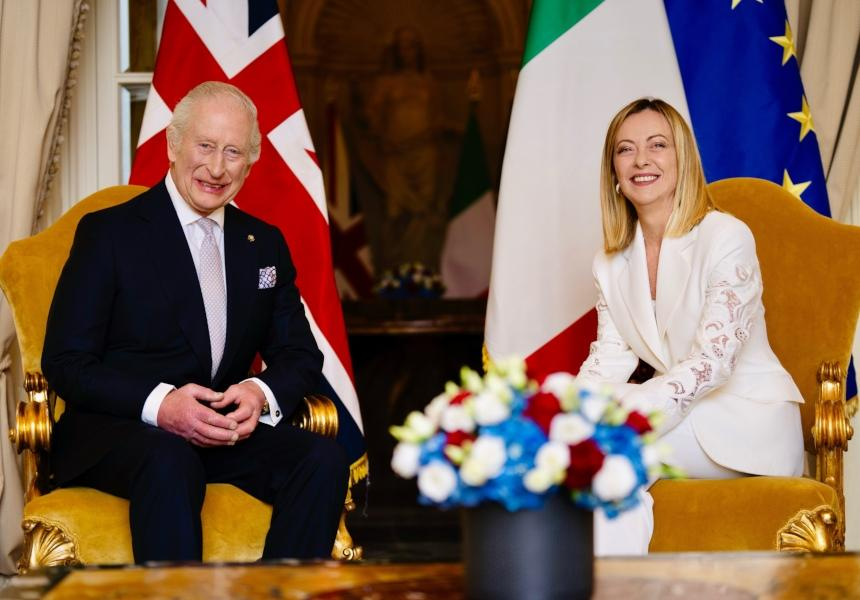
- Charles with Prime Minister Giorgia Meloni on 9 April
- Date: 7 to 10 April 2025
- Location: Rome Ravenna Vatican City
- Type: State visit
- Participants: King Charles III; Queen Camilla; Sergio Mattarella; Giorgia Meloni

King Charles III of the United Kingdom and his wife Queen Camilla made a state visit to Italy from 7 to 10 April 2025, coinciding with their 20th wedding anniversary on 9 April 2025.

== Background ==
The four-day state visit was at the request of the British government and was part of the UK's post-Brexit "reset" in reinforcing links with European allies.

The details of the visit were announced on 18 March 2025, alongside a planned state visit to the Holy See. The latter plans were cancelled the following week as Pope Francis was advised to rest. Francis ultimately died the following month.

== Visit ==
=== 7 April ===
The King and Queen arrived in Rome on 7 April. They were welcomed by a military band and a guard of honour.

New photographs of the couple, taken in the Villa Wolkonsky, the British ambassador's residence in Rome by Chris Jackson, were released to mark their 20th wedding anniversary on 9 April.

=== 8 April ===
On the second day of their visit, the King and Queen were received at Quirinal Palace by President Sergio Mattarella and his daughter, Laura Mattarella. They also were celebrated with a joint flyover of the Italian Air Force's Frecce Tricolori and the RAF's Red Arrows. The couple then laid a wreath on the Tomb of the Unknown Soldier and received a special tour of the Colosseum. In the evening, the King and Queen attended a reception to meet members of the British-Italian community at Villa Wolkonsky.

=== 9 April ===
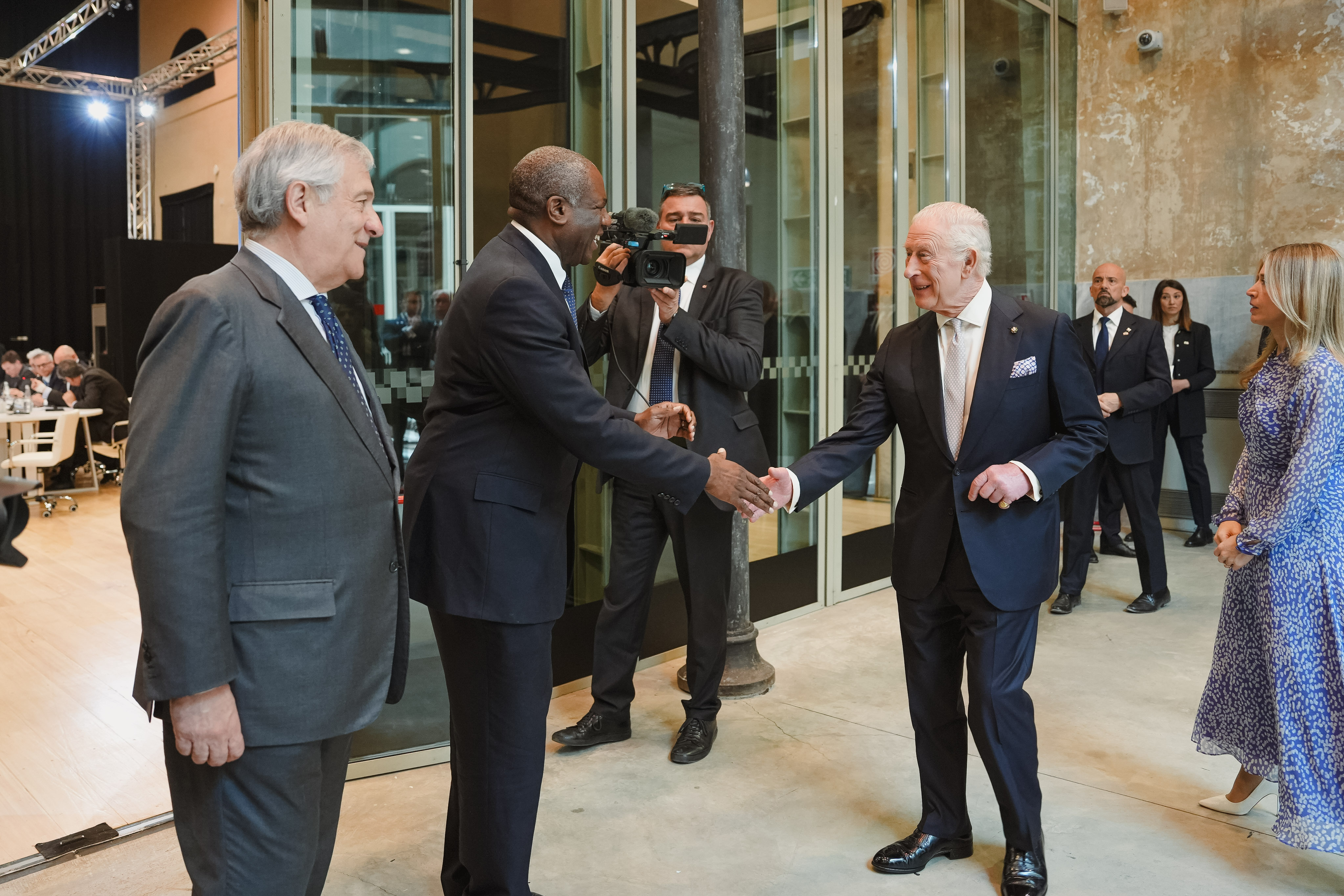
The King at the Clean Power for Growth roundtable at Mattatoio, Piazza Orazio Giustiniani, Rome

The third day of the state visit coincided with the King and Queen's 20th wedding anniversary, with the Queen wearing her repurposed wedding dress. The King began the day with a private meeting with Prime Minister Giorgia Meloni and viewed a performance of Shakespeare's Othello. The Queen, meanwhile, visited a school in Rome. The King also addressed a joint session of the Italian Parliament, the first British monarch to do so.

The King and Queen had a surprise private meeting with Pope Francis at the Vatican, after their state visit to the Holy See was cancelled over concerns for the pontiff's health. The royal couple ended the day as the guests of honour at a state banquet hosted by President Mattarella at the Quirinal Palace.

=== 10 April ===
After undertaking separate engagements in Rome, the King and Queen travelled to Ravenna where they visited Dante's Tomb and heard a reading of the Divine Comedy. The King also visited the Basilica of San Vitale and the Mausoleum of Galla Placidia. The royal couple also celebrated the 80th anniversary of the region's liberation during World War II by a British and Canadian force. To close the visit, the King and Queen visited a traditional market.

== See also ==
- List of official overseas trips made by Charles III
- Italy–United Kingdom relations
