= State visit by Charles III to France =

2023 visit by the British monarch

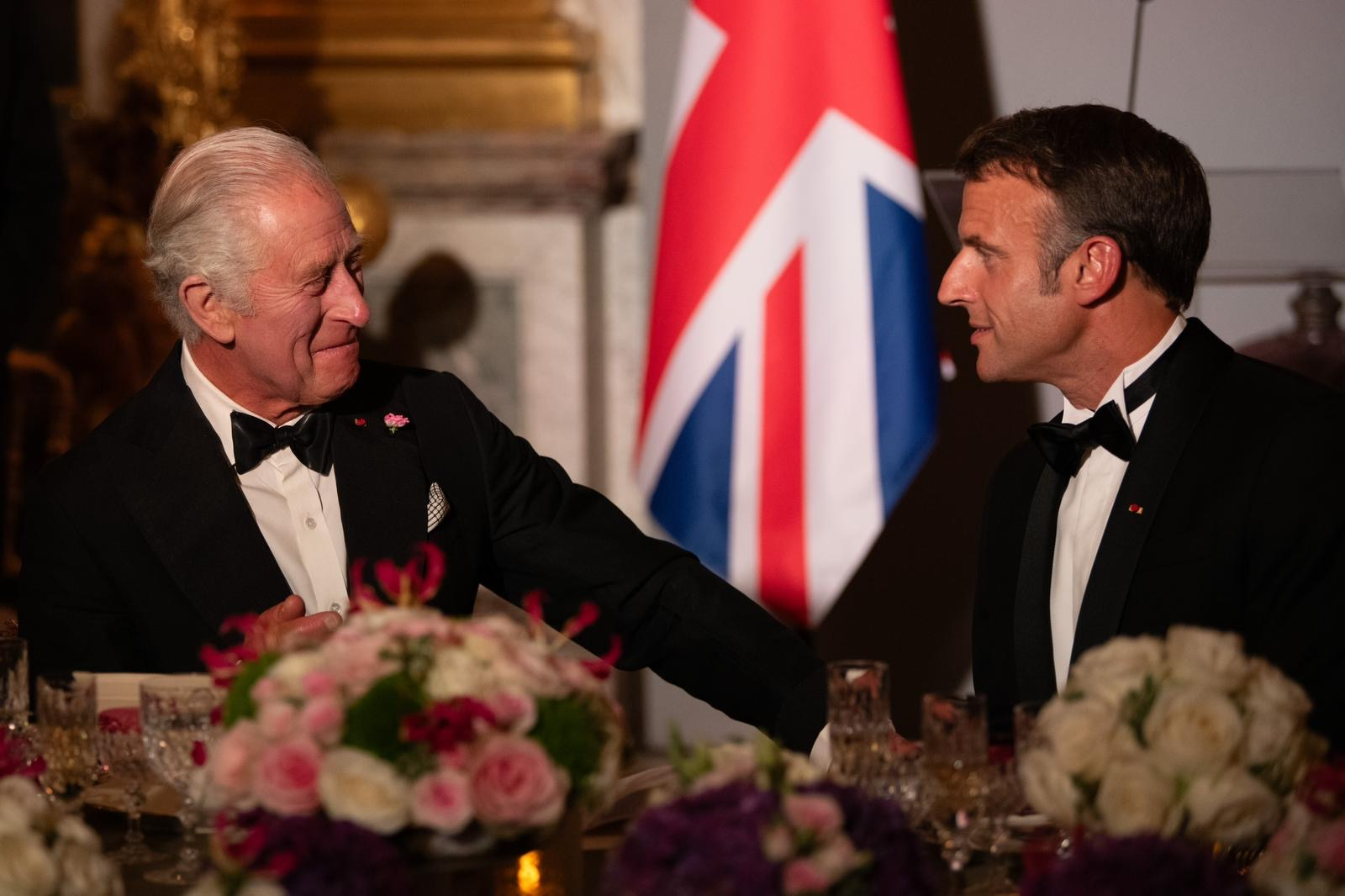
- Charles III and Emmanuel Macron at a state dinner on 20 September.
- Date: 20 to 22 September 2023
- Location: Paris Bordeaux
- Type: State visit
- Participants: King Charles III; Queen Camilla; President Emmanuel Macron

King Charles III of the United Kingdom and his wife Queen Camilla made a state visit to France from 20 to 22 September 2023, hosted by the President of France, Emmanuel Macron and his wife, Brigitte Macron. It was his first official visit as British monarch on French soil and the 36th visit in his life.

== Background ==
Queen Elizabeth II with her husband Prince Philip, Duke of Edinburgh, when she was still a princess and pregnant with the current British monarch, had made multiple visits to French soil, whose leaders, including Charles de Gaulle, Valéry Giscard d'Estaing and others, received her with open arms, for which with her continuous visits, they strengthened the ties of friendship of their peoples.

The aim of this visit was to showcase the strong bond and friendship between France and Britain to strengthen ties that have been strained by Brexit.

== Visit ==
The visit was originally supposed to take place in March but the trip was postponed because of the 2023 French pension reform unrest.

=== 20 September ===
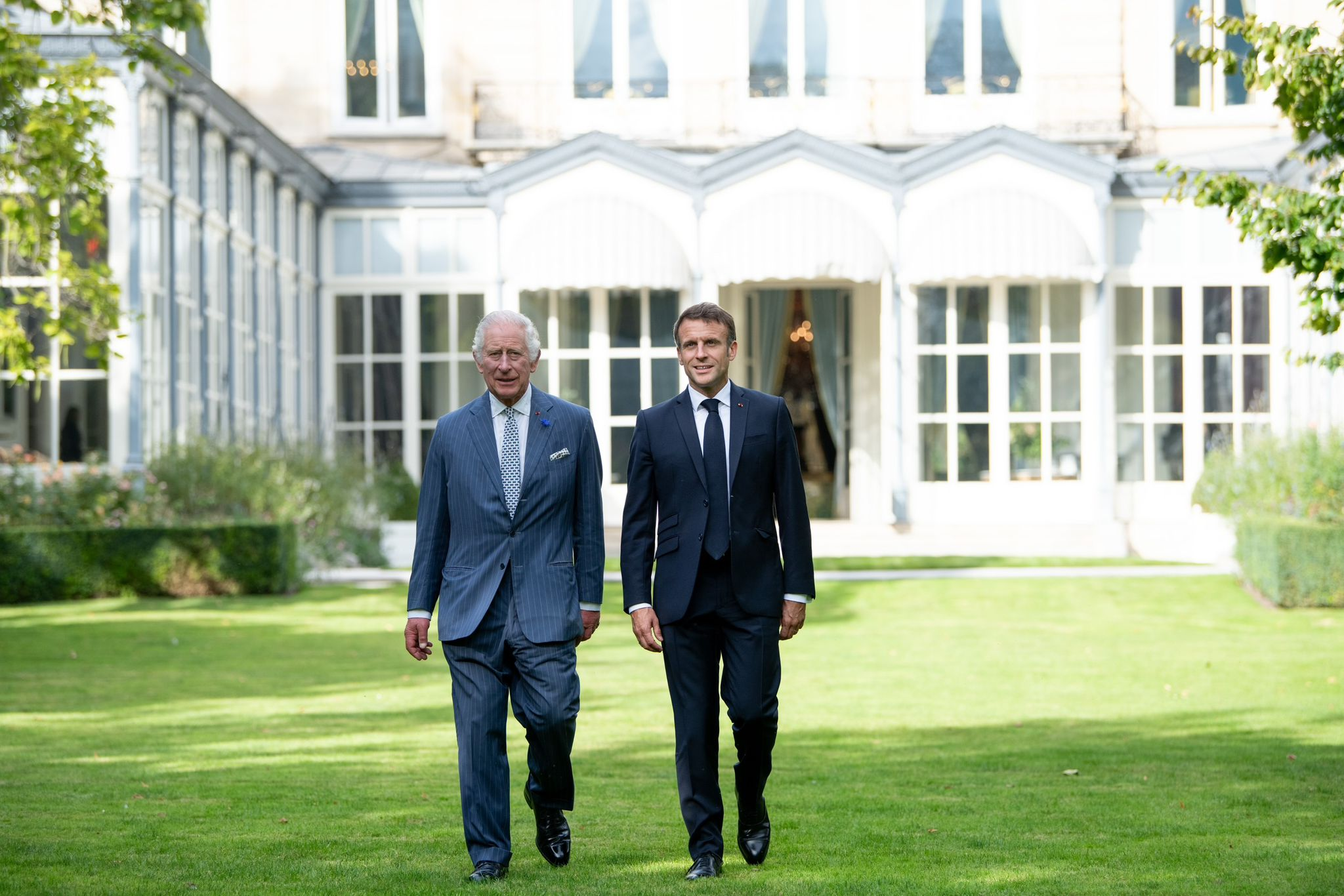
The King and President Macron at the British Embassy in Paris

On 20 September 2023, King Charles and his wife, Queen Camilla, arrived at Paris Orly Airport and were greeted by Prime Minister Élisabeth Borne.

The King and Queen drove to the Arc de Triomphe where the King inspected a guard of honour of French forces and participated in a wreath-laying ceremony at the Tomb of the Unknown Soldier. The French Air and Space Force elite acrobatic flying team Patrouille de France and the RAF Red Arrows performed a flypast following the ceremony. The King joined President Macron for a ceremonial tree-planting in the garden of Hôtel de Charost, the British Ambassador's residence.

That evening, the King and Queen attended a state banquet at the Palace of Versailles with 160 people in attendance.

=== 21 September ===
The King traveled to Luxembourg Palace where he addressed the French Senate, becoming the first British monarch to do so. During the speech, he addressed the Russo-Ukrainian war and climate change, calling it an "existential challenge". Meanwhile, at the Bibliothèque Nationale de France (BNF), the Queen and Brigitte Macron marked the launch of a new U.K.-France literary prize – ‘The Entente Littéraire Prize’ - at a reception attended by notable literary figures from both countries. The event celebrated the importance of literature and the literary connections between the UK and France.

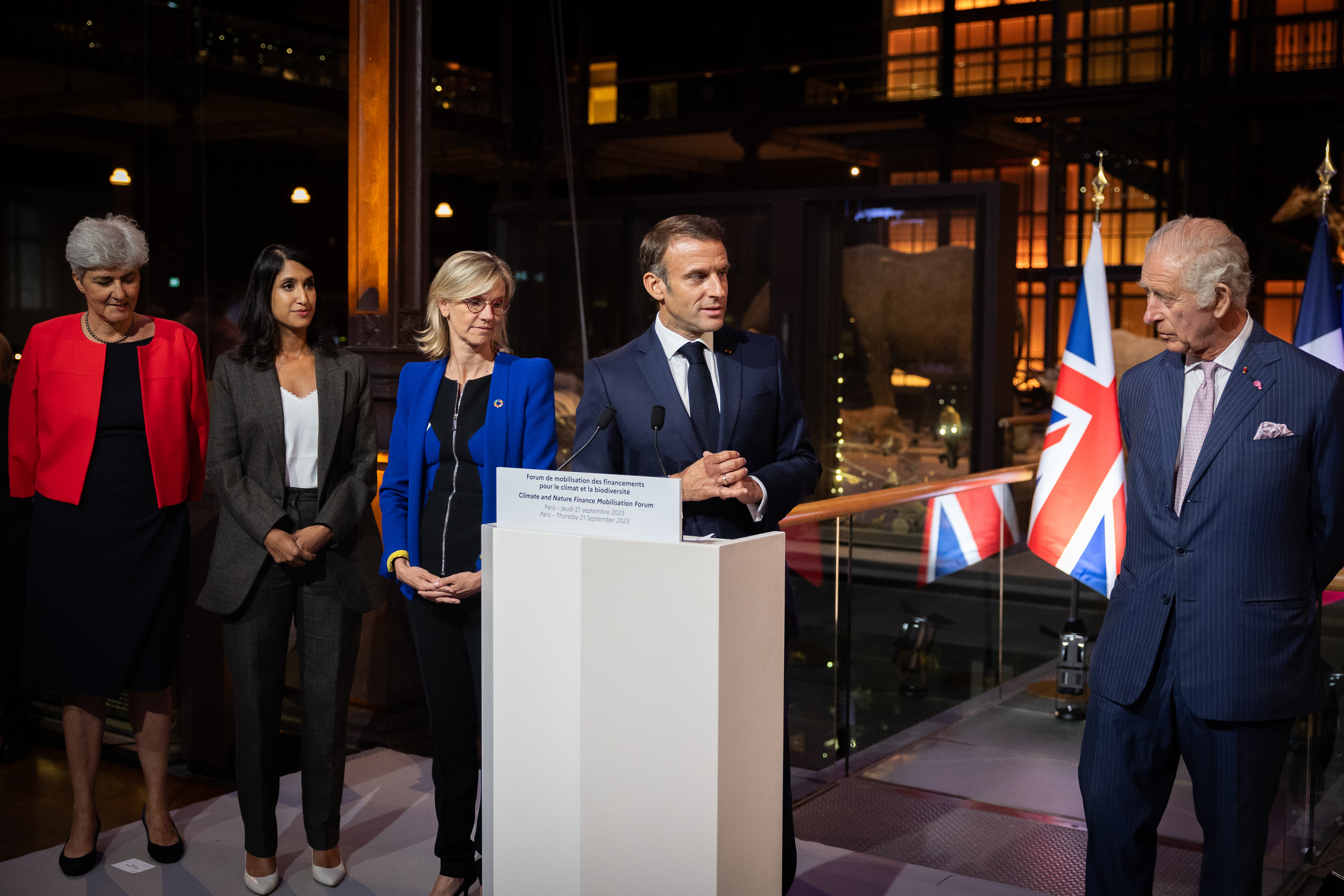
The King and President Macron at the SV Climate and Nature Finance Mobilisation Forum at the Natural History Museum, Paris

In the afternoon, the King and Queen visited Saint-Denis, the home of the Rugby World Cup village, as France hosts the Rugby World Cup and Paris prepares to host the Olympics and Paralympics next year. The visit celebrated the important role sport can play in bringing communities closer together and enriching the lives of young people.

Charles and Camilla went on to visit "Le 19M" Campus, accompanied by Brigitte Macron, to learn about the organization's work to promote education, creativity, and inclusion through teaching young people traditional "haute couture" skills such as embroidery, pinning, and producing tweed. The King and Queen later visited a central Paris flower market named after Queen Elizabeth II and met local florists. The market was formally renamed during Her Late Majesty’s visit in 2014. This visit also served as the formal welcome to the city from the Mayor of Paris, Anne Hidalgo, also known as the "Parchment Ceremony." This was the first time the ceremony has taken place outside of the Hotel de Ville.

The King and Queen then visited the Notre-Dame de Paris. The royal couple and Macron, with his wife Brigitte, spoke with firefighters who assisted in fighting the 2019 fire. The royal couple then traveled to Saint-Denis where they visited local businesses and the Basilica of Saint-Denis.

=== 22 September ===
The King and Queen ended their state visit in Bordeaux. They went on to board H.M.S. IRON DUKE, a Royal Navy Type 23 Frigate, for a reception to highlight the defence ties between France and the UK. The King met with emergency workers affected by wildfires in the region last year and visited an experimental forest designed to monitor the impact of climate change on urban woodlands. Meanwhile, the Queen visited Le Pain de l'Amitié, a local Bordeaux charity which houses a subsidised supermarket, kitchen and restaurant, and provides low-cost food and necessities to those in the local community who may be in need. It also acts as a hub for local families to connect and spend time together. They also attended a festival in celebration of British and French culture and business at the Place de la Bourse. The King and Queen ended their State Visit with a tour of Chateau Smith Haut Lafitte to learn about sustainable vineyard practices in the Bordeaux wine producing region.

== See also ==
- List of official overseas trips made by Charles III
- France–United Kingdom relations
