= 1983 New Zealand Royal Visit Honours =

Awards list for New Zealand

1983 Royal Visit Honours
- Previous: 1983 New Year Honours; Next: 1983 Queen's Birthday Honours
- Type: New Zealand royal honours: Queen's Service Order
- Date: 20 April 1983
- Country: New Zealand
- Total recipients: 1

The 1983 New Zealand Royal Visit Honours was an appointment by Elizabeth II to the Queen's Service Order, to mark the visit of the Prince and Princess of Wales to New Zealand in April that year, and was dated 20 April 1983.

== Companion of the Queen's Service Order (QSO) ==
Extra Companion, for public services

- His Royal Highness The Prince Charles Philip Arthur George, Prince of Wales KG KT GCB AK
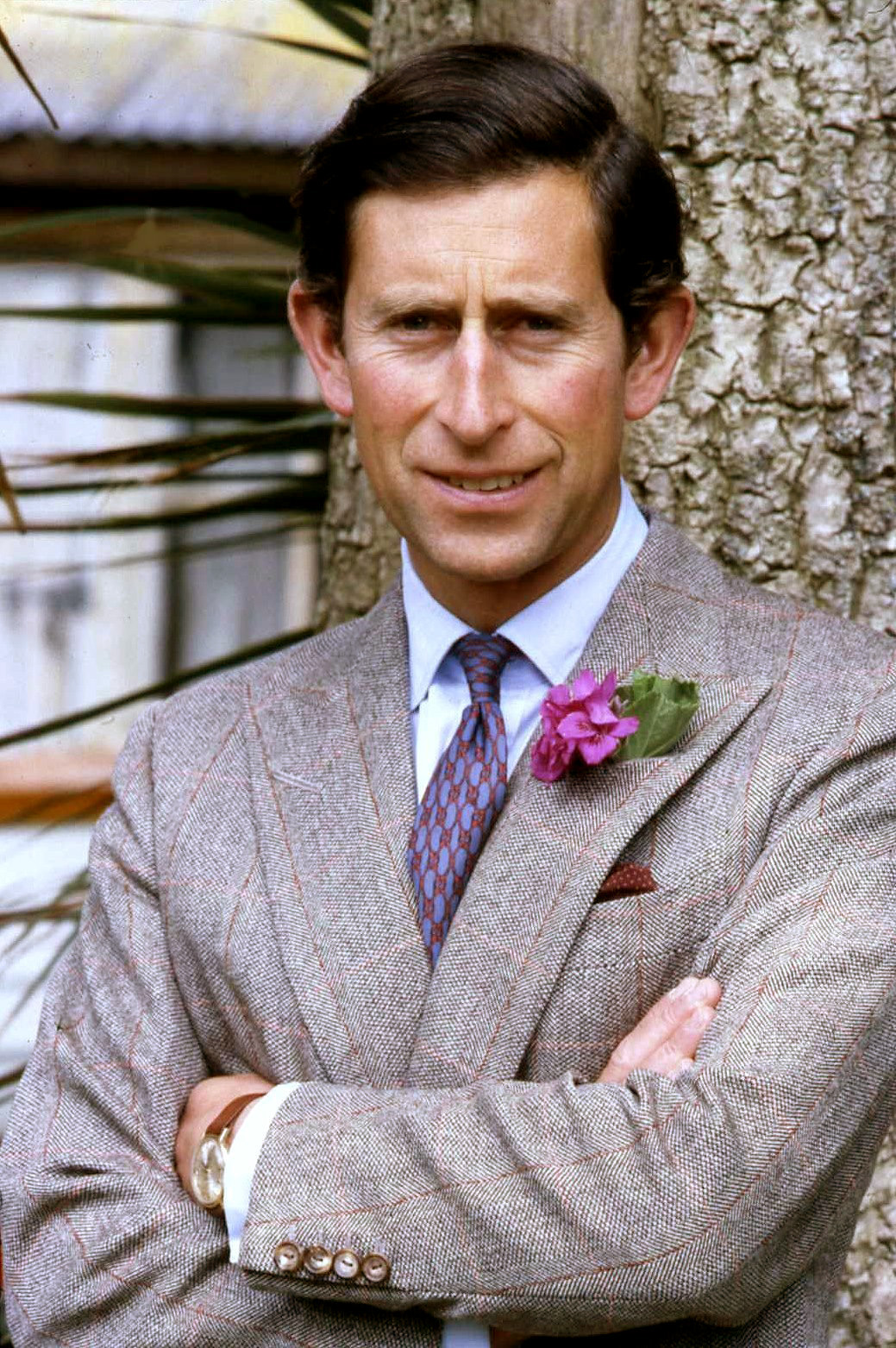
Charles, Prince of Wales
