= Valea Zălanului =

Valea Zălanului Hungarian: Zalánpatak, German: Zalaner Glashütte
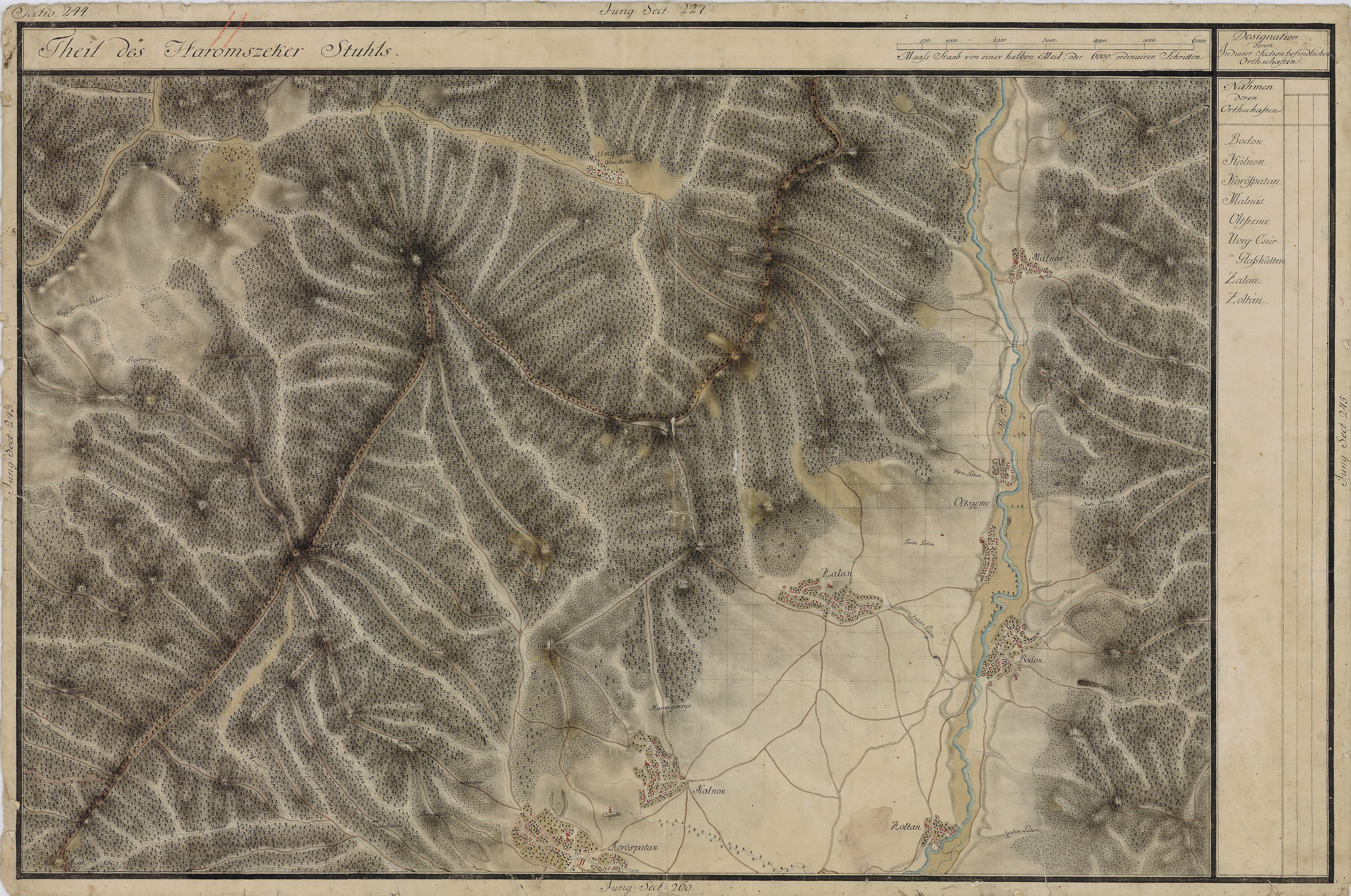
- "Valea Zălanului" in the Josephinian Land Survey of Transylvania, 1769-1773

- Location of the village on the map of Romania
- Coordinates: 46°0′40″N 25°45′19″E
- Country: Romania
- County: Covasna
- Commune: Malnaș

Population (2021)
  - Total: 110
- Time zone: UTC+2 (EET)
  - Summer (DST): UTC+3 (EEST)
- Postal Code: 527119

Valea Zălanului (Hungarian: Zalánpatak, German: Zalaner Glashütte) is a village of Malnaș commune in Covasna County, Transylvania, Romania. It is located in the northern part of the county, in the Baraolt Mountains.

It's an isolated hamlet of 110 inhabitants, with a strong traditional imprint of the villages of Székely Land.

When he was still only Prince of Wales, Charles III bought in this village three buildings more than a century old, which he renovated and transformed into temporary residences. In May 2011 and on May 30, 2014, he visited the village. In April 2012, during the Easter holidays, on his first visit to Romania, Prince Harry, accompanied by some friends, stayed at Valea Zălanului, where he served meals specific to the area, thus having the opportunity to taste traditional Romanian culinary dishes - Transylvanian vegetable soup and pălincă. On Easter Day, Prince Harry rode an enduro motorcycle through the hills in the area.

Also, in June 2023, a few days after his coronation, on his first trip abroad as sovereign, King Charles III came to rest for a few days at his residence in Valea Zălanului.

Although a very small village, Valea Zălanului became famous after King Charles III chose it as one of his favorite resting places, delighted by the peace and naturalness of the place and the warmth of the inhabitants.

I have come to love Romania — your culture and art, your heritage and history, your sweeping landscapes and priceless biodiversity...
Romania has retained, in its ancient forests, pristine countryside, and through some remarkable examples of sustainable farming, an incomparable richness of nature.

— King Charles III, Bucharest, June 3, 2023
