= Edith Marguerite Harrington =

Paternal grandmother of Queen Camilla of the United Kingdom

- Born: 14 June 1893; Fulham, London, England
- Died: 3 January 1981 (aged 87)
- Other name: Margot
- Spouses: Philip Morton Shand (m. 1916; div. 1920) Herbert Charles Tippet (m. 1921; died 1947)
- Children: Bruce Shand
- Relatives: Queen Camilla (granddaughter)

Edith Marguerite Tippet (née Harrington, previously Shand; 14 June 1893 – 3 January 1981), sometimes known as Margot, was the first wife of the English journalist Philip Morton Shand and through her only child, Bruce, was the paternal grandmother of Queen Camilla.

== Childhood ==
Edith Marguerite Harrington was born at 32 Linver Road, Fulham, London, on 14 June 1893, the second of the six children born to George Woods Harrington (1865–1920), an accounts clerk, and his wife Alice Edith Harrington, née Stillman (1865–1935). The son of a butler, her father changed employers many times during his working life but his modest income meant that he always had difficulty accommodating his growing family, moving first to Putney, then to Acton, London and eventually to Isleworth. As was common practice in large Victorian families, the elder children lodged with their grandparents due to space constraints; by 1901 Edith's elder brother Cyril was living with his grandfather and by 1911 Edith was living there too.

== First marriage and issue ==
On leaving school, Edith found work as a milliner, but by the outbreak of the First World War she had moved on to become a secretary and was living in a small apartment in Hammersmith. Around this time, she met her first husband, Philip Morton Shand, known as Morton, then working as a clerk at the War Office and living at the Shand family home in nearby Kensington. Shand was an English journalist, architecture critic (an early proponent of modernism), wine and food writer, entrepreneur and pomologist. They married at St. Peter's Church, Hammersmith, London on 22 April 1916 and set up home together in a splendid mansion block overlooking Battersea Park where her only child, Bruce Middleton Hope Shand, was born on 22 January 1917.

Unfortunately, the marriage was to be a short-lived and unhappy one, ending in divorce after just four years. Shand was to prove a serial womanizer who cared little for his child, and Edith divorced him on grounds of his adultery on 4 July 1920. Thereafter, he failed to acknowledge or provide for his son, marrying three more times and fathering more children.

Bruce Middleton Hope Shand (22 January 1917 – 11 June 2006) subsequently married Rosalind Maud Cubitt, daughter of the 3rd Baron Ashcombe and Sonia Rosemary Keppel. They had three children:

- Camilla Rosemary Shand (born 17 July 1947), now Queen of the United Kingdom
- Sonia Annabel Shand (born 2 February 1949)
- Mark Roland Shand (28 June 1951 – 23 April 2014)

== Second marriage ==
Divorce carried a huge stigma in the 1920s, even for the injured party, and with so many men dead after the war, Edith did well to find a suitable step-father for her child. Her second husband, though lacking the wealth and background of Shand, was to prove a far better husband. In 1921 she married former reservist army officer Herbert Charles Coningsby Tippet, known as Charles, (1891–1947) at St. Martin-in-the-Fields, London. Tippet had been invalided out of the army, suffering from shell shock after serving with distinction on the western front; and had begun a new career as a golf club secretary and golf course designer, an occupation which required him to move wherever contracts took him. In 1921 that meant moving to the United States, which was undergoing a post-war boom in golf course construction. Tippet left for New York in November 1921, and Edith followed him a month later accompanied by her four-year-old son and the boy's nanny.

After visiting England in June 1923, Edith and her son returned to the U.S. in September 1923 with the stated intent (according to U.S. immigration records) of residing permanently in the United States and taking U.S. citizenship, although this subsequently did not happen.

During the six years from 1921 to 1927, Edith enjoyed a comfortable life-style with all that America's Jazz Age had to offer. Her husband acquired a circle of wealthy and influential associates from the world of golf and Edith Tippet moved around the east coast of the US from Park Avenue, New York City, to Long Island to Florida, abandoning the name Edith and adopting the more fashionable name of Margot along the way. But when the design contracts came to an end, she and her husband moved back to England in 1927, where he took a succession of appointments as secretary to various prestigious golf clubs. Bruce Shand returned with them to England to begin his education as a boarder at Rugby School. Thereafter, he was to spend more time in the company of his wealthy grandparents than the Tippets.

The Tippets lived in London for ten years while he worked at Royal Wimbledon Golf Club; and in 1937 they moved to Walton Heath, occupying a house on the course. A brief spell in Ireland followed in 1938 when Tippet accepted a design contract at Tramore, County Waterford.

By 1945, Charles Tippet had been given the job of reviving Rye Golf Club in East Sussex, but it proved too much; on 26 November 1947, after showing his friend the Bishop of Ely around the place, he collapsed and was found on the floor of his office. Edith was called, but two days later Major Tippet, as he had by then become, was dead at the age of 56.

== Death ==
Charles Tippet had not been a wealthy man, he left no will and just £666 in cash at his death and Edith Tippet was to see out her days in reduced circumstances. After her husband's death she moved to Kent. She stationed herself in a small cottage at Wittersham, Kent, more than 50 miles away from her son Bruce's country house, The Laines, at Plumpton, East Sussex. As the years advanced, Edith moved to Cooden Beach in Sussex, where she died almost unremarked, on 3 January 1981. She was survived by her son, Bruce, and her three grandchildren.
