= Ragnhild Jacobsson =

Norwegian entrepreneur, social worker, and environmental activist

- Born: Ragnhild Røstad; 15 July 1966 (age 59); Skjervøy. Norway
- Other name: Rags
- Citizenship: Swedish
- Occupation: Philanthropist
- Years active: 2001–present
- Organization: The Perfect World Foundation
- Known for: social entrepreneurship and conservationism

Ragnhild Jacobsson (born 15 July 1966) is a Norwegian entrepreneur, social worker, and environmental activist.

== Personal life ==
Jacobsson is married to Lars Valentin Jacobsson and the couple supports animal projects globally.

== Philanthropy ==
Ragnhild and her husband Lars have been working on animal projects since 2000. They bought Volunteer Travels Ltd. in 2008 and founded The Perfect World Foundation in 2010. The organizations are now working on more than 80 wildlife and environmental projects in 23 countries. In 2014, Jacobsson, under the umbrella of The Perfect World Foundation, arranged a wildlife gala and conference in Scandinavia. The event was titled Save the Rhino 2014 and was, at the time, the largest of its type in the region. Mark Shand who was among the advisors to hold this event was the guest of honour and was awarded the "Conservationist of Year 2014" award and the "Fragile Rhino".

Both Ragnhild and Lars are ambassadors of the London-based organisation "Elephant Family" and are actively involved in the conservation of Asian elephants.
