= Aaron Simpson =

Aaron Simpson may refer to:

- Aaron Simpson (entrepreneur) (born 1972), British businessman
- Aaron Simpson (fighter) (born 1974), American mixed martial artist
- Aaron Simpson (footballer, born 1997), English footballer
- Aaron Simpson (footballer, born 1999), English footballer
- Aaron Simpson (producer) (born 1971), American television producer
- Aaron Simpson (born 2009)
