= Annastasia Seebohm =

British-Greek businesswoman (born 1986)

Annastasia Seebohm-Giacomini
- Born: 1986 (age 39–40)
- Occupation: Businesswoman
- Known for: Quintessentially Group

Annastasia Seebohm-Giacomini is a British-Greek businesswoman, who served as the group chief executive officer of Quintessentially Group until 2020, and has served as the chief executive officer of Brilliant Minds Foundation since 2021. Seebohm-Giacomini was recognized as one of the 50 Most Influential People in Britain by GQ magazine in 2020.

== Early life ==
Seebohm-Giacomini was born in 1986. She studied International Business Management from Cardiff University.

== Career ==
Seebohm-Giacomini started her career with the British concierge company, Quintessentially Group and became the group CEO in February 2018. Here, she led a team of over 1,000 employees in 50 cities, tracking revenues at over $100 million globally in 2018.

Later, she joined as CEO of Brilliant Minds Foundation in May 2020 to broaden the foundation's community.

== Recognition ==
In 2018, Seebohm-Giacomini was recognized as one of the Luxury Daily's Women to Watch, and in 2020, she was recognized as one of the 50 Most Influential People in Britain by GQ magazine.
