= The Perfect World Foundation =

- Abbreviation: TPWF
- Founded: 2010
- Type: Nonprofit Organization
- Purpose: Conservation, Environmentalism
- Headquarters: Kungsgatan, Gothenburg, Sweden
- Region served: Global
- Website: theperfectworldfoundation.org

The Perfect World Foundation is a non-governmental organisation that raises awareness and supports efforts to prevent the global ecological crisis. The organization was founded by Ragnhild Jacobsson and Lars Valentin Jacobsson in 2010. Through various events, the organization spreads knowledge and creates conditions for driving its own initiatives, as well as supporting a number of independent grassroots projects around the world.

The organization annually presents the conservation award, “The Perfect World Foundation Award”, to recognize a prominent person who has used their voice to protect the world’s wildlife and nature.

== The Perfect World Foundation Award ==
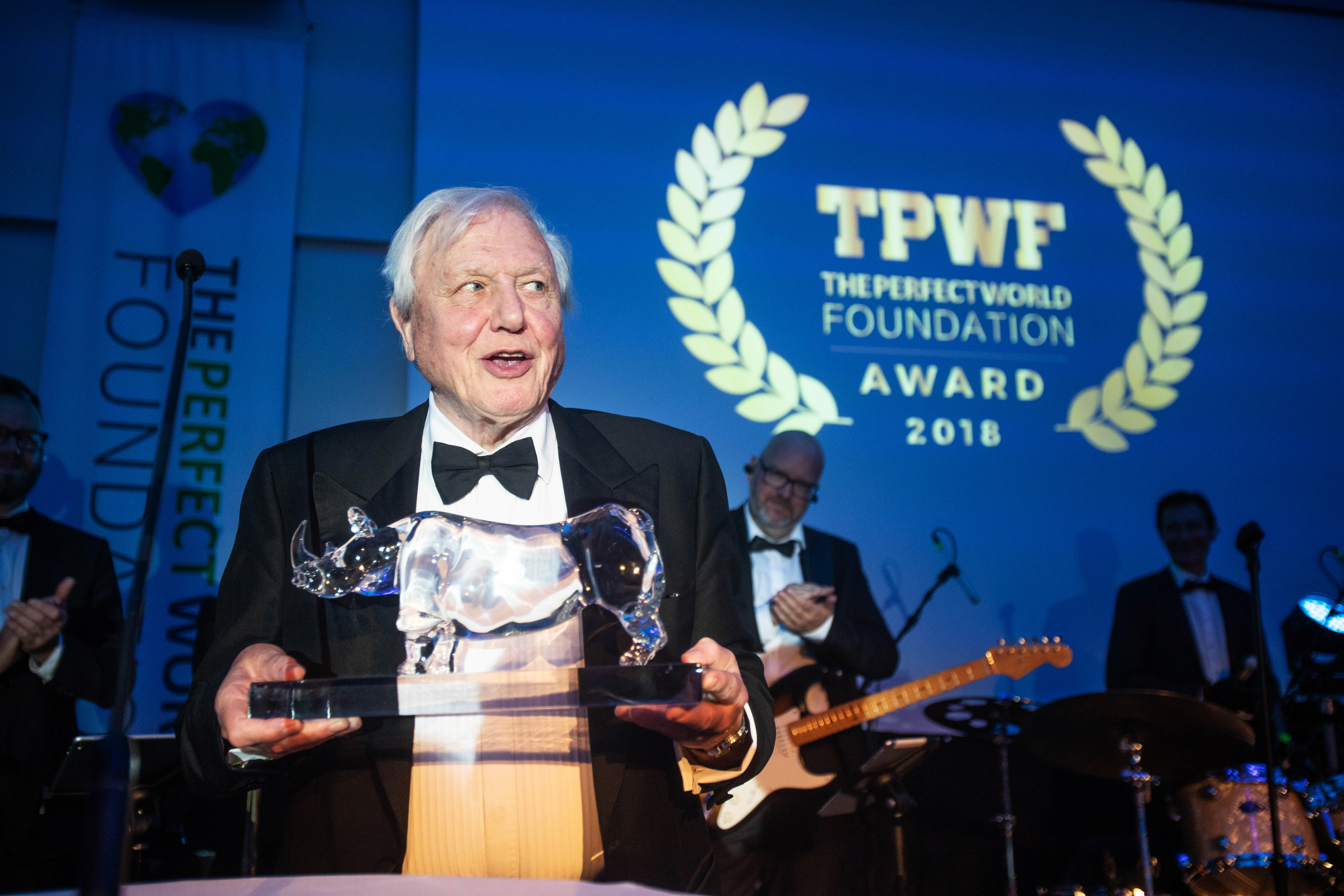
Sir David Attenborough, The Perfect World Foundation Award 2018

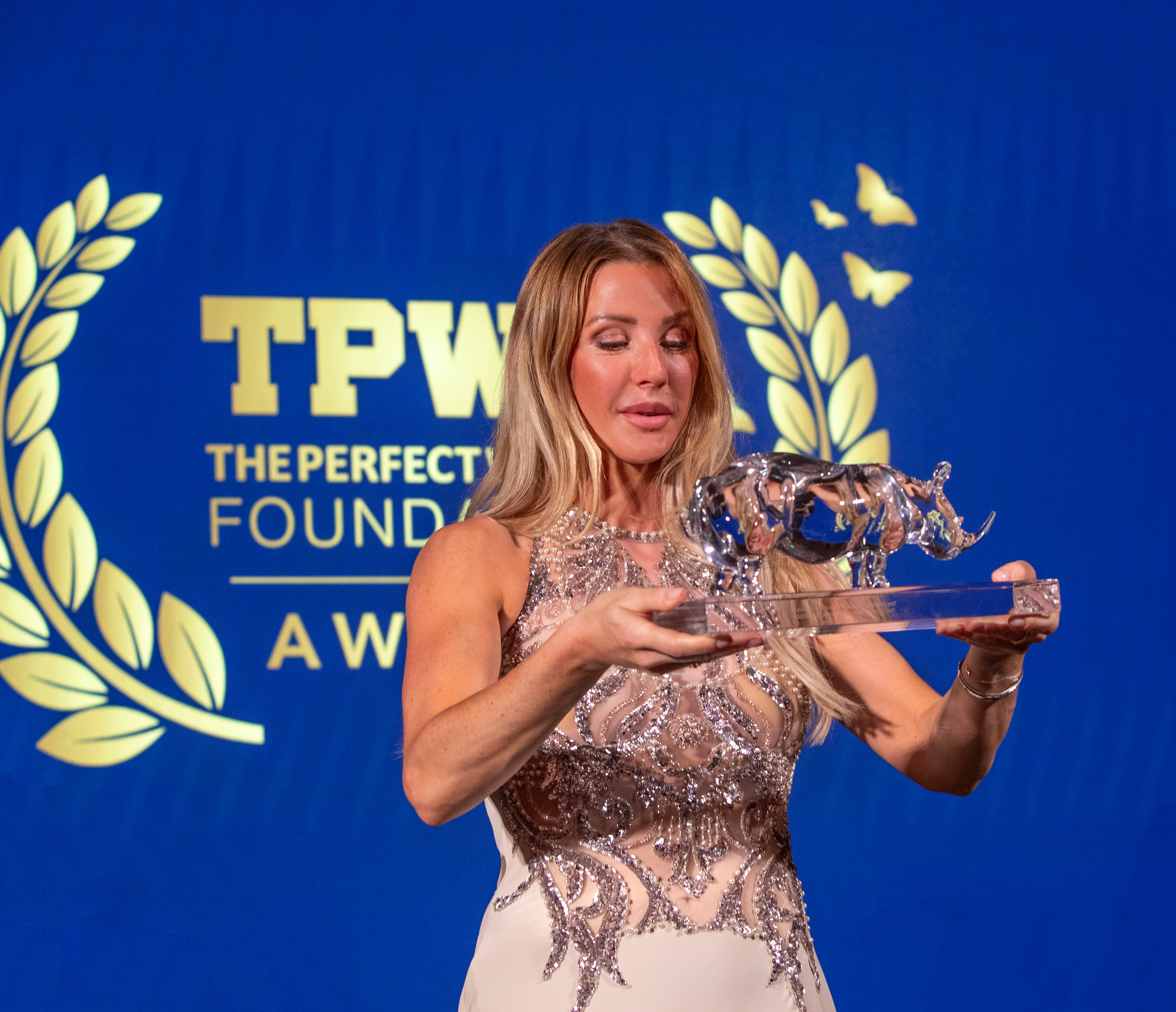
Ellie Goulding with The Conservationist of the Year 2024 Award.

The Perfect World Foundation annually presents their honorary award ”The Perfect World Foundation Award” to a person who has contributed to significant conservation efforts by increasing global awareness and knowledge about the importance of protecting our planet’s wildlife, environment, and biodiversity. Since its inauguration in 2014, it has become one of the most prestigious conservation award in Scandinavia. The recipient also receives The Fragile Rhino prize, a rhinoceros sculpted in glass. In her role as ambassador for The Perfect World Foundation, Sarah, Duchess of York has presented the award since 2017.

The recipients to date have been:

Year	Recipient	Work awarded for
2014	Mark Shand	the brother of Camilla, Duchess of Cornwall and Elephant Family, jointly, for their work to protect the Asian elephant.
2015	Dame Jane Goodall	for her work in animal conservation, especially the chimpanzee.
2016	Dr Richard Leakey	for his work to save the African elephant.
2017	Dr Sylvia Earle	for her work to preserve our oceans marine conservation.
2018	Sir David Attenborough	for his life-long commitment to preserve our natural world.
2019	Greta Thunberg	for having succeeded in creating global awareness of the climate issue.
2020	Wangari Maathai	for her progressive work for environment, democracy, and women's rights
2021	Dian Fossey	in recognition of her ground-breaking research into mountain gorillas which has led to their protection and an increasing population.
2022	Albert II, Prince of Monaco	His Serene Highness was recognized and honoured for his life-long commitment, dedication, and actions to preserve our oceans.
2023	Kristin Davis	for her significant contributions to the conservation of the planet's wildlife and nature, raising global awareness about the importance of protecting our biodiversity.
2024	Ellie Goulding	for her admirable and inspirational efforts to mobilize the youth in saving our planet's biological diversity.
2025	Ms Wallis Annenberg	For her groundbreaking philanthropic engagement — most notably her support for the Wallis Annenberg Wildlife Crossing, the world’s largest of its kind.
2026	Sebastian Vettel	Sebastian Vettel, four-time Formula 1 World Champion, will receive The Perfect World Foundation Award 2026 for his long-term commitment to raising awareness and driving positive environmental and social change within sport and beyond it.
