= BAAF =

BAAF is a four-letter acronym that may stand for:

- Big Apple Anime Fest — An anime convention which was held annually between 2001 and 2003 in New York City
- Blackstone Army Airfield, abbreviated as Blackstone AAF or BAAF
- British Association for Adoption and Fostering — A former UK membership association whose services included publishing, training, advice, consultancy and family finding related to child adoption and fostering
- Brussels Ancient Art Fair or Basel Ancient Art Fair, an art fair held yearly in both Brussels and Basel specializing in classical, Egyptian, and Near Eastern antiquities
- Deezy Baaf, a New Zealand rapper/singer known more commonly for the creation of Baafism, a religion that has been described by observers as a cult
