= Herbert Charles Tippet =

British amateur golfer (1891-1947)

- Born: Herbert Charles Coningsby Tippet; 23 November 1891; Newport, Monmouthshire, Wales
- Died: 28 November 1947 (aged 56); Brede, Sussex, England
- Occupations: Golf course architect and golf club secretary
- Years active: 1919–47
- Known for: Designing golf courses in USA, UK and Ireland
- Spouse: Edith Marguerite Harrington (m. 1921)

Herbert Charles Coningsby Tippet (23 November 1891 – 28 November 1947) was a leading British amateur golfer, golf club administrator, and golf course architect in the years between the wars. A former reserve army officer, Tippet was for a time a close associate of millionaire American property developer Carl G. Fisher, the man who created the Miami Beach, Florida resort, for whom he designed a number of golf courses in Florida and Long Island. He was one of the most successful British amateur golfers of the 1920s and 1930s and later served as secretary at several prestigious UK golf clubs. He was the second husband of Edith Marguerite Harrington, grandmother of Queen Camilla.

== Early life ==
Herbert Charles Coningsby Tippet M.C. (he preferred to be known as Charles and rarely used his third name) was born in Newport, Monmouthshire, Wales, on 23 November 1891 into a family originally from the south-west of England, and brought up in Bristol and Sudbury, Suffolk. Baptised in St. Woollos, now Newport Cathedral, on 27 February 1892, he was the son of Charles Henry Tippet (1863–1915), a retired Lieutenant-Colonel turned surveyor, Conservative Party agent and keen amateur golfer, and Edith Alice Goodson. Tippet's father, who had served in the Second Boer War, re-applied for his commission at the outbreak of the First World War and was later killed while serving at Gallipoli. He had been the founder and first captain of Newton Green Golf Club in Sudbury.

The middle child and only son in a family of three, Charles Tippet acquired two things from his father; a lifelong interest in the British Army and an outstanding ability to play golf. It had always been understood that Tippet would follow his father into the army. Whilst at private school, he served in the Army Cadet Force and was commissioned into the Territorial Force when it absorbed the Cadet Force in 1908, being commissioned on 27 November 1908 as a Second Lieutenant in the 5th (Territorial) Battalion of the Suffolk Regiment based at Bury St. Edmunds.

== Military career ==
On leaving school in 1910, Tippet did not become a professional soldier. Instead, he followed his father's occupation, briefly training as a Land Surveyor, a skill which he was later to put to good use in landscaping golf courses, and he applied to join the Special Reserve of Officers, into which he was commissioned as a Probationer Second Lieutenant on 2 April 1910, in the 4th (Extra or Special Reserve) Battalion of his father's regiment the Royal Dublin Fusiliers; an Irish infantry regiment of the British Army. The Special Reserve of Officers was a cadre of trained civilians who served as part-time officers for a fixed number of weeks each year and who were available to be mobilized in the event of war. For Irish regiments, it served a similar function to the Territorial Force in England. He completed six months of basic officer training between 1910 and 1911 during which time he was seconded to 2nd Battalion at Farnborough Barracks, Hampshire. By then he had developed his father's love of golf and became a successful amateur in the years immediately prior to the First World War, representing Royal North Devon Golf Club. After completing basic officer training at Aldershot, he was confirmed in his rank on 2 June 1911 and transferred back to 4th Battalion, at that time stationed at Richmond Barracks in Templemore, Tipperary, where he became a member of The Royal Dublin Golf Club. On 1 December of that year, he was promoted to Lieutenant. In 1913 he was sent to the School of Musketry in Hythe, Kent where he received a first-class certificate in small-arms use and on 16 April 1913 he was awarded the title of Officer Instructor of Musketry, effectively the depot's small-arms training officer. The appointment brought with it the position of Assistant Adjutant, a junior staff post. Tippet became a full-time soldier when the Special Reserve of Officers was mobilized on the outbreak of the First World War, following which, on 6 September 1914, he was promoted to Captain. In October, he transferred with the Battalion to Sittingbourne in England, returning to Templemore in December 1915.

4th Battalion acted mainly as a recruitment and training unit and Tippet spent the first two years of World War I engaged in second-line duties but that was to change in the spring of 1916 when he was to see action for the first time. On 24 April 1916 the Easter Rising occurred in Dublin and the following day, Tippet's Battalion was one of a number of units sent in to suppress the uprising. They forced their way into the centre of Dublin and fought the insurgents along the railway line from Broadstone Station to Cabra Bridge. After the rebels withdrew, 4th Battalion formed a cordon around the area until the rising ended.

Shortly after, Tippet left Ireland. The Dublins had suffered severe casualties at Hulluch, near Loos, and replacements were urgently needed. On 14 May 1916, he was posted to France in the build-up to the Somme offensive, serving on attachment to the 8th (Service) Battalion Royal Dublin Fusiliers, 48th Infantry Brigade, 16th (Irish) Division throughout the Somme campaign. Tippet is listed among the officers who took part in the Battle of Ginchy from 3 to 10 September 1916. On 6 July 1917 his attachment to 8th Battalion ended and from 9 July he was appointed Staff Captain GSO3 attached to the 1/1 Herts, 118th Infantry Brigade, 39th Division, in preparation for the Third Battle of Ypres where 118th Brigade saw action. No record exists of his military actions although, many years later, his step-son wrote that he had fought gallantly and Hansen refers to him as a war hero. He was mentioned in dispatches on 7 November 1917 for gallantry at Passchendaele and in March 1918 he took part in the First Battles of the Somme where 39th Division took heavy casualties in helping to prevent the Germans from breaking through to the coast. On 24 March, 1/1 Herts Commanding Officer, Lt. Col. Phillips, had been taken prisoner and Tippet took acting command of the battalion. On 28 March, during the battalion’s withdrawal to Coyeux and a subsequent counter-attack, Tippet suffered a head wound from shrapnel and was hospitalised. For these actions he was subsequently awarded the Military Cross; an award given for "an act or acts of exemplary gallantry during active operations against the enemy".

After recovering from the head wound, Tippet was appointed Staff Captain, 155th Infantry Brigade, 52nd Lowland Division, where he served out the remainder of the war.

The physical injuries would eventually heal but the mental scars never did. After serving for two years as a front-line infantry officer on the Somme and at Passchendaele, Tippet's experiences left him suffering severely from shell-shock, a condition which meant he was unable to cope with sudden loud noises and which was to remain with him for life. The medical condition brought his military career to an end. He left the army in 1919 but chose to be known as Captain Tippet in civilian life, a title generally considered appropriate only for ex-cavalry officers, which Tippet was not.

He was to re-apply for his commission at the outbreak of the Second World War and on 26 May 1940 was commissioned into the General Service Corps as a Lieutenant but awarded the War Substantive rank of Captain and placed on the General List (a reserve of experienced former officers who could be mobilized if needed). However, he did not see active service and was released on health grounds at the end of 1943. Following his release from the General List he was granted the lifetime honorary rank of Major on 1 January 1944.

== Golfing career ==
Having been invalided out of the army, Tippet was obliged to seek a new career and decided to earn his living from golf. However, although he was a golfer of considerable ability, he never played as a professional. His real forte was to lie in golf administration and in the designing of golf courses, learning his craft by studying the methods of Old Tom Morris, the architect of Royal North Devon and inventor of the modern golf course, and of James Braid who had re-built Newton Green. In 1919, Tippet was appointed manager of Ashford Manor Golf Club in Middlesex working for club captain and secretary Harold Hilton, a winner of two British Amateurs, under whom Tippet learned the business of running a golf club. The following year, Tippet won the prestigious Kashmir Cup, an individual scratch open competition held at Royal North Devon.

Harold Hilton was a well-known player on both sides of the Atlantic having won both the British and U.S. Amateurs in 1911 and was a member of the prestigious Apawamis Golf Club in Westchester, New York. When the nearby Meadow Brook Golf Club in Westbury, Long Island was looking for a new secretary in 1921, Hilton recommended his protégé Charles Tippet. Tippet left Southampton for New York on 5 November 1921 being joined a month later by his wife and step-son.

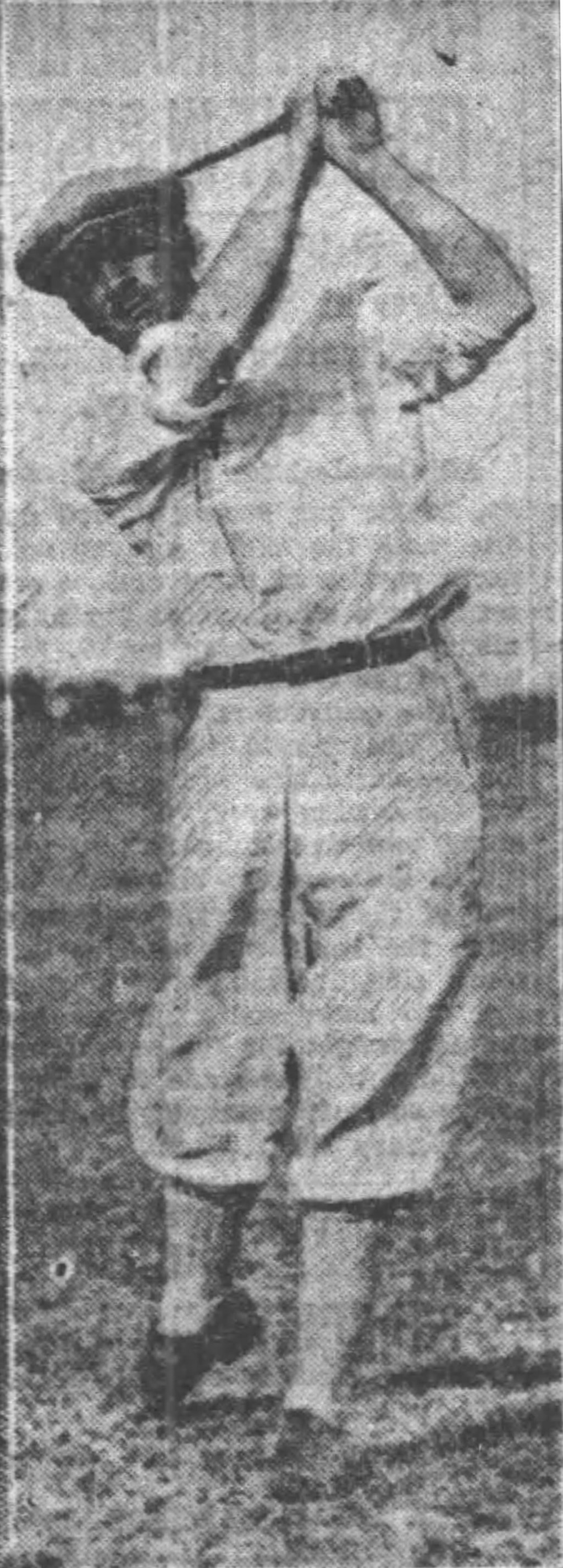
Poor quality but rare photo of HCC Tippet playing golf

Meadow Brook was at that time a nine-hole course with a history stretching back to 1894. Tippet started working on improvements to the course and immediately began to acquire a reputation as a course designer. Unusually, despite having briefly trained as a Land Surveyor, he preferred to work from putty or clay models rather than drawings. He was quickly to attract a circle of wealthy patrons and soon began receiving commissions to design 9-hole courses on private Long Island estates; the first at Gustave Heckscher's Upland House, the second at Middleton Burrill's Jericho Farm, both in Westbury. A third followed on Julius Fleischmann's Lindens estate at Sands Point, Port Washington.

His first major commission then followed to design a 9-hole and two 18-hole courses at the former William Phelps Manor in Teaneck, New Jersey, then being developed as a leisure facility. One of these courses is now the Overpeck Golf Club (6,584 yards, par 72), the remainder having been built over.

After taking up his duties as club secretary, Tippet began competing as an amateur in east coast tournaments while representing both Meadow Brook and Royal North Devon where he had retained his membership. A short, stocky right-hander always to be seen in baggy cap and plus-fours, he was the leading amateur in the Metropolitan Open at Lido in September 1922, and the following month he reached the second round of the Nassau Country Club invitation tournament at Glen Cove, New York. In 1923 he finished runner-up in the Metropolitan Amateur at Siwanoy Country Club in Bronxville, New York, becoming acquainted with many of the leading U.S. golfers, among them the legendary Gene Sarazen. Describing his performance that day, William Bardsley of Golf Illustrated said:

Of .... the runner-up Captain H.C.C. Tippett, (sic) formerly of the Royal North Devon Club, England, and now golf secretary of the Meadow Brook Club, Long Island, suffice to say that while Tippett held his own from the tees, driving a magnificently long ball for a man of his stature, he was weak on his approach shots and very bad on the greens. It was really there that [his opponent] displayed his superiority. Tippett is a very good player but gives the impression of being extended on all shots. Such a style always suggests a possible period of wildness in the offing. It certainly does not inspire confidence from the spectator’s point of view, but on the other hand the Britisher’s play throughout the tournament showed that he is capable of some real golf. He certainly had no sinecure on his way to the final, and his success speaks for itself. He eventually was defeated by six and five, after being six down at lunchtime; mainly because [his opponent] kept on playing par golf just as he had from the very first.

That year Tippet was introduced to property millionaire and keen golfer Carl Graham Fisher, possibly by Sarazen who was a friend of both men. Fisher, who had been responsible for the development of Miami Beach, was then considering building a number of golf courses in Miami. Tippet was recommended to design them and became closely associated with Fisher for the next few years. Golf was enjoying an enormous boom in popularity in America in the years immediately following the First World War as an enriched middle class, excluded from more elitist country sports, sought new leisure activities open to anyone with the necessary application and resources. Although the U.S. would soon dominate the game, in the early 1920s U.S. golf still looked across the Atlantic for a lead in both coaching and course design, and Britons with the necessary skills and experience were in high demand. Fisher planned to construct a complex of three courses catering for all standards of player; 9-hole and 18-hole courses for learners and recreational golfers, and a more challenging championship course at which it was intended to stage exhibition matches and PGA Tour events. The recreational courses were to be constructed and brought into use quickly while the championship course was to be a more ambitious longer-term project.

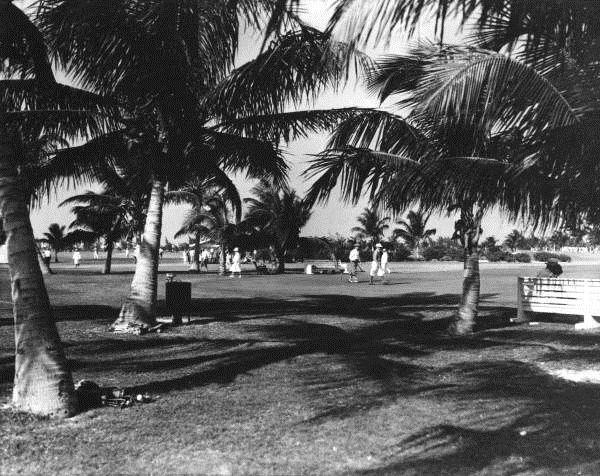
Tippet's first design for Fisher was the Bayshore course at Miami Beach

Tippet's first design for Fisher was for alterations to the Bayshore Golf Club at Alton Beach, Miami (6,903 yards, par 72) which had been designed by Willie Park in 1921. Tippet's redesigned course opened in 1923 followed much later by the 18-hole championship course at La Gorce (6,295 yards, par 70). Three years in design and construction and built on a former mangrove swamp with links dredged from Biscayne Bay, La Gorce finally opened on 7 January 1927 with Willie Klein as club professional. Together with a 9-hole par-3 course they were to form Fisher's prestigious Miami Beach Golf Club which he hoped would attract wealthy northerners to Florida. During the winter of 1923 Tippet left Meadow Brook and moved with his family to Florida where he was appointed golf director at Miami Beach. Fisher built a house for him on Prairie Avenue, between the Miami Beach and Bayshores courses, complete with observation tower from which he could supervise both courses.

The following year he designed two further Florida courses for Fisher, the first at his new Hollywood Beach Hotel Country Club (6,376 yards, par 70). Taken into public ownership in 1929, the course was re-built by Donald Ross and remains a municipal course to this day. The second was for an 18-hole course at Fisher's short-lived Nautilus Hotel at Miami Beach which opened in 1924 and closed when the complex became a military hospital.

A further commission came his way that year for a 9-hole course at Homestead, Miami which later re-opened as the 6,139 yard, par 72 Redland Golf and Country Club in 1947.

Tippet continued to compete in amateur events and in 1924 he won the inaugural Dixie Amateur at the Miami Country Club and finished as the top amateur in that year's Miami Open. At this time, Tippet first met Robert Trent Jones when he had come down to Florida to give lessons, and the two spent time together discussing their contrasting philosophies on golf course design. Although only 18 years of age, Jones was already a prolific golfer and would later become one of golf's most renowned course architects, going on to re-design some of Tippet's courses. Three years after their first meeting, Tippet was instrumental in persuading Jones, Sarazen and a number of other leading U.S. golfers to take part in the first La Gorce Open, a PGA Tour event which ran from 1928 until 1931. Johnny Farrell was the inaugural winner of the event.

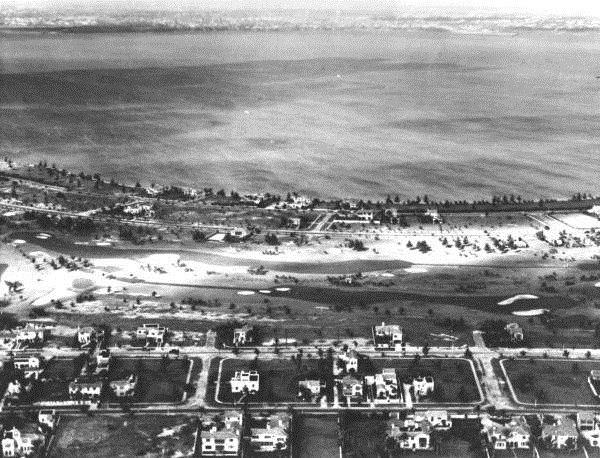
The course at La Gorce at the time of the La Gorce Open

In 1925, Tippet had gone on record to say that he believed there was then a market for as many as ten more courses in Florida to meet the ever-growing demand for golf. He estimated that up to $1million would need to be spent on construction and a further $250,000 per annum on running them in the first two years alone, no doubt hoping that a share of this would be coming his way. By this time he was managing not only Bayshore and Miami Beach Golf Clubs but also the Flamingo Hotel 9-hole course (3,150 yards) which he had designed for Fisher as part of his Flamingo Hotel project, along with another of Fisher's developments, the Flamingo Polo Club.

Despite their close association, Tippet did not work exclusively for Fisher. Following the opening of the Miami Beach courses, he was engaged to design a public course at Normandy Isle, Florida. The latter was to be built on 120 acres of land donated to the City of Miami Beach and for which Tippet submitted a building estimate of $119,200. However, due to the Great Depression, the project was postponed and work did not commence until 1937 using an amended design by Toomy and Flynn.

In 1925, Tippet became involved in a new development with Gene Sarazen. On 26 July that year a new company known as South Florida Golf and Country Club Inc. was incorporated for the purpose of creating a new residential district and golf club some ten miles north of Miami to be known as Golf Park. Built at a cost of $1.5 million and opened on 1 January 1926, the new club had leading Scottish-American golfer W.D. Patterson as its manager. At the heart of this development was a new course designed by Tippet, (6,300 yards, par 70) which he believed to be one of the best courses in Florida. Sarazen and Leo Diegel were hired as club professionals to front the new enterprise. The idea for the development had first been mooted in 1924 although the company was not formed for another two years and it is unclear whether Tippet was financially involved or merely employed to build the golf course. Unfortunately, shortly after the Golf Park course opened it was damaged by bad weather following which it was hit by the 1926 Miami hurricane which devastated Miami and much of South Florida, necessitating its closure for most of the year. It re-opened on 19 December but in the meantime some $750,000 had been spent on a lavish clubhouse and the enforced closure was a blow from which the backers could not recover. The project failed and the golf club closed in the spring of 1927 when the company ran out of money. If, as one report suggests, Tippet lost his fortune in Florida real estate, it is likely to have been in this ill-starred venture. (The project was later resurrected as the Westview Country Club before closing in 2011.)

Another public course at Westside, Fort Lauderdale (6,915 yards, par 72) opened in November 1926. Commissioned by the City Council, this course later became the Fort Lauderdale Golf and Country Club.

Buoyed by the success of Miami Beach, Fisher turned his attention to Long Island where he intended to build a "Miami of the North" and in 1926 instructed Captain Tippet to design two new courses at the eastern end of the Hamptons. A new 18-hole course at Montauk Downs (6,976 yards, par 72) opened in 1927. Rebuilt by Robert Trent Jones Sr. in 1968, it is still considered to be one of the most difficult courses on Long Island due to the strong wind from the ocean on both sides. A short-lived second course was built at nearby Hither Hills. But the Long Island development was not, at the time, a financial success and Tippet's association with Fisher was finally ended by the Wall Street crash of 1929 which brought the boom in American golf course construction, temporarily, to an end.

Meanwhile, in January 1927, Tippet had won one last amateur tournament in America, beating C.A. Roberts 9 and 8 to take the Glenn Curtiss match play trophy at Miami-Hialaeh before returning to England in April to take up a new post as secretary of Royal Wimbledon Golf Club, a prestigious club with the Prince of Wales as captain. He also resumed playing in UK amateur competitions, reaching the fifth round of the British Amateur Championship at Royal North Devon in 1931, a tournament then regarded as a Major. The following year he reached the last eight in the same championship and was talked about for that year's Walker Cup team. In 1935 he won the London Amateur Foursomes and was captain of Surrey County Golf Union from 1938 until 1947. After ten years at Royal Wimbledon, Tippet moved on to Walton Heath Golf Club, later to be the venue for the 1981 Ryder Cup, where he served as secretary from 1937 until 1945. In 1938, whilst at Walton Heath, Tippet received a commission to re-design Tramore Golf Club, (6,700 yards, par 72) near Waterford in Ireland, a course which still boasts of his association. The following year, he redesigned part of Walton Heath, combining the 5th and 6th holes into a revised 5th, and creating new 6th and 7th holes.

In 1945 he was engaged as secretary by Rye Golf Club in Sussex, then suffering from severe damage as a result of wartime defensive works, with a brief to re-construct and repair the links; which he did while creating new short 2nd and 7th holes to avoid a road which crossed the course. However, Major Tippet, as he had become by this time, was not a well man having been released by the army as a result of his shattered nerves in 1943, and this appointment was to prove his last. On 26 November 1947, he collapsed in his office at Rye and died two days later.

== Golf course design philosophy ==
Tippet's trademark was simplicity. His well-won reputation came from his willingness to adhere closely to the design concepts which he had learned from Morris and Braid and which, by the 1920s, were being increasingly disregarded by many of Tippet's contemporaries. British and American course architects were beginning to diverge in their approaches, with Britons still preferring the traditional links style of course while US designers were increasingly moving toward more landscaped parkland courses. Robert Trent Jones in particular held differing views from Tippet on course design resulting from their backgrounds on opposite sides of the Atlantic. Tippet declined to over-elaborate his courses, avoiding the excessive use of bunkers and other hazards behind his greens. Instead, he employed an economy of landscaping, preferring to allow the natural topography of the course to present its own challenges. For example, of Montauk Downs it has been said:

The rolling moorlands of Montauk Downs enabled golf course architect Captain H.C. Tippet to construct a green that had a pronounced Scottish flavour. The Downs are natural hazards in themselves. No restriction zones enabled Captain Tippet to build the 175 acre, 18-hole course with most of the green[s] and tees on natural elevations.

Of La Gorce it was said:

The yardage of the course is not so great, being slightly under 6,200, but [it] more than makes up for this shortage in its layout and hazards. A par 70 on this links will be harder to obtain than on most courses 500 yards longer. However, the holes are nicely mixed and there are several nice three-shot spots on the course, which is primarily a test of the iron clubs on most holes.

while Tramore claims:

On this site which is gently undulating and intercepted by two streams, Capt H.C. Tippet of Walton Heath has laid out a magnificent 18-hold championship course ... a fair test for golfers of all abilities.

Only at the Golf Park course did he make lavish use of bunkers and hazards, requiring the golfer to use every club in the bag to get round.

Generally, his greens were flat and he avoided the artificial ridges and dips that other architects increasingly relied upon. The over-use of such devices by other designers, whilst adding a further degree of difficulty to a hole, did not add to its par which was based solely on yardage to the pin. Tippet's courses, in contrast, afforded a more realistic opportunity to achieve par and encouraged bold approach play, which proved equally popular with both professionals and recreational golfers.

== Personal life and reputation ==
In November 1921 Tippet married Edith Marguerite Shand (née Harrington), a divorcée, formerly married to architectural critic and writer Philip Morton Shand, at St. Martin-in-the-Fields, London. The only child of her first marriage, Bruce Shand (1917–2006), was the father of Queen Camilla. Immediately after his marriage, Tippet left England to take up his position at Meadow Brook in New York, his wife and step-son following him in December 1921. Mrs. Tippet and Bruce Shand returned briefly to the UK in June 1923 before returning to America in September, stating their intention to take US citizenship, although this subsequently did not happen. They remained in America until 1927 when Tippet returned to take up his post at Royal Wimbledon; Bruce Shand going to Rugby School, an education paid for by the Shands with whom the Tippets remained friends. Indeed, following the death of her husband in 1936, Morton Shand's mother Augusta, lived with the Tippets in Banstead, Surrey. Edith Tippet survived her husband by thirty-three years, dying at Cooden Beach, Bexhill, Sussex in 1981. There were no children of the marriage.

Although the Tippets had enjoyed celebrated company and a lavish lifestyle during America's Jazz Age in the 1920s, Tippet was never a wealthy man. His playing record shows he was clearly a golfer of considerable ability and had he played as a professional in the modern era, he would have been well rewarded. Instead, his amateur status meant he earned nothing from his playing career and after the lucrative design contracts in America came to an end, he earned a modest income as a golf administrator. There is no record of his having ever owned any of the addresses at which he resided and he left no will and few assets. However, although his achievements as a golfer are now largely forgotten, several of the courses Charles Tippet built, especially those in America and Ireland, still boast of his association.

== Golf courses designed, re-designed or improved by Tippet ==
- Meadow Brook, Long Island, NY. USA (improvements), 1921
- Upland House 9-hole private course, Westbury, Long Island, NY, USA. 1922
- Jericho Farm 9-hole private course, Westbury, Long Island, NY, USA, 1922
- Lindens 9-hole private course, Port Washington, Long Island, NY, USA, 1922
- Phelps Manor, Teaneck, NJ, USA (now Overpeck Golf Club), 1923
- Bayshore, Miami, FL. USA (now Miami Beach Golf Club), alterations 1923, re-built 1933
- Bayshore 9-Hole, Miami, FL. USA,(now Miami Beach Municipal) 1923
- La Gorce, Miami, FL. USA, designed 1923, opened 1927, re-built 1969
- Flamingo Hotel 9-hole, Biscayne Bay, FL. USA 1923 (to a public park 1930, since built over)
- Hollywood Beach Hotel and Country Club, Hollywood Beach, FL, USA, 1924, re-built 1929
- Nautilus Hotel, Miami Beach, FL, USA, 1924 (since built over)
- Homestead, Miami Beach, FL, USA, 1924 (re-opened as Redland Golf & Country Club, 1947)
- Golf Park, Miami, FL. USA, 1926 (later Westview Country Club, closed 2011)
- Westside, Fort Lauderdale, FL. USA, (now Fort Lauderdale Golf Club) 1926, re-built 2007
- Normandy Isle, Miami Beach, FL. USA, (now Normandy Shores) 1927 (design amended 1937)
- Montauk Downs, Long Island, NY. USA, 1926-1927
- Hither Hills, Long Island, NY. USA (no longer in existence), 1926-1927
- Tramore, Waterford, Ireland, (re-built) 1938
- Walton Heath, Walton-on-the-Hill, Surrey, UK (new 5th, 6th and 7th holes) 1939
- Rye, Sussex, UK, (re-design of 2nd and 7th holes) 1945

== Golf clubs represented by Tippet ==
- Newton Green, Sudbury, UK
- Royal Dublin, Dublin, Ireland
- Royal North Devon, Westward Ho! UK
- Ashford Manor, Ashford, UK
- Meadow Brook, Long Island, NY. USA
- Lido, Long Island, NY, USA
- Royal Wimbledon, London, UK
- Walton Heath, Walton-on-the-Hill, UK
- Rye, Sussex, UK

== Golf clubs managed by Tippet ==
- Ashford Manor Golf Club, Ashford, Middlesex, UK, Manager, 1919-1921
- Meadow Brook Golf & Polo Club, Westbury, Long Island, NY, USA, Secretary, 1921-1923
- Miami Beach Golf Club, Miami, FL, USA, Golf Director, 1923-1927
- Flamingo Hotel Golf and Polo Clubs, Biscayne Bay, FL, USA, Manager 1925-1927
- Royal Wimbledon Golf Club, London, UK, Secretary, 1927-1937
- Walton Heath Golf Club, Walton-on-the-Hill, Surrey, UK, Secretary, 1937-1945
- Rye Golf Club, Rye, Sussex, UK, Secretary, 1945-1947
