= Matiabag Palace =

Matiabag Rajbari
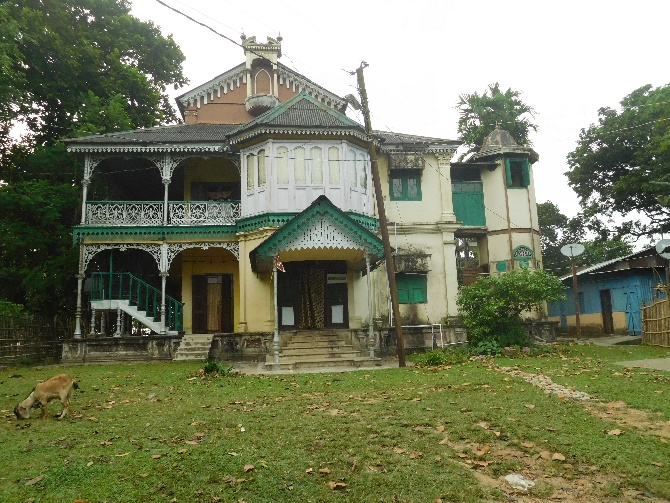
- Matiabag Palace or Gauripur Rajbari located at the bank of river Gadadhar was the residence of Folk queen of Goalporia Lokageet Pratima Baruah Pandey
- Interactive map of the Matiabag Rajbari area
- Alternative names: Hawakhana

General information
- Architectural style: Mughal Architecture and British Architecture
- Location: Matiabag, Gauripur, Dhubri, India
- Coordinates: 26.5°N 89.58°E
- Construction started: 1904
- Completed: 1914
- Renovated: 2023
- Cost: ₹ 340000
- Client: Raja Prabhat Chandra Barua
- Owner: Government of Assam

Other information
- Number of rooms: 24

Matiabag Rajbari or Matiabag Palace is located in Gauripur in Dhubri district of Assam. The palace was built by Raja Prabhat Chandra Barua of the Gauripur royal family on a small hill-top at Matiabagh, Gauripur on the banks of the Gadadhar river. It was the royal guest house and summer residence (Hawakhana) by the royal family of Gauripur, also known as ‘Rangamati Baruas. The construction of the palace began in 1904 and was completed by 1914. The palace was built by Chinese carpenters from China Town in Kolkata at a cost of ₹ 340000, the palace features elements of Hindu, Mughal and British architecture.

== History ==
As per people's belief, once Raja Pratap Chandra Barua (the then ruler of Gauripur) was hunting in the forest and saw a frog which was eating a snake. He was surprised to see this unnatural thing. Being a very strong devotee of Goddess Mahamaya, he believed that it was a message for him from Mahamaya. Afterward, he constructed a temple for Goddess Mahamaya and named the place as Gauripur after the alias "Gauri" of Mahamaya.

== Restoration ==
In January 2023, the Government of Assam acquired the palace at ₹ 15.20 crore to preserve it as a heritage site and museum in memory of Pratima Barua Pandey. The Chief Minister of Assam announced that the restoration and preservation of the palace for conversion into a heritage site and museum would be administered by the state’s Department of Cultural Affairs.

== Transportation ==
Driving distance from Dhubri to Gauripur is 9 km and from Guwahati to Gauripur is 261 km. The nearest railway station is at Dhubri. Well-connected airports are at Guwahati (261 km) and Bagdogra (226 km).

== Notable residents ==
- Pramathesh Chandra Barua, Indian Actor and Director, Devdas Fame
- Jamuna Barua, Indian Actress
- Pratima Barua Pandey, Indian Folk Singer, Padma Shri Awardee
- Parbati Barua, Indian Animal Conservation Activist, Padma Shri Awardee
