= Parbati Barua =

Indian conservationist

- Born: 1954 (age 71–72); Gauripur, (Dhubri),India
- Citizenship: India
- Occupations: Mahout, animal rights activist
- Years active: 1972–
- Known for: Elephant conservation
- Father: Prakritish Chandra Barua
- Relatives: Pratima Barua Pandey (sister); Pramathesh Barua (paternal uncle); Prabir Kumar Barua (brother)
- Awards: Padma Shri (2024)

Parbati Barua is an Indian animal conservation activist and a mahout (Indian term for an elephant tamer and caretaker). She was one of nine children to late Prakritish Chandra Barua of the Royal Family of Gauripur. Prakritish was the last member of the Rajas of Gauripur to hold power. She came to the limelight after the BBC created the documentary "Queen of the Elephants" based on her life, along with the companion book by Mark Shand. She resided in Guwahati and was also a member of the Asian Elephant Specialist Group, IUCN. She was the sister of Pratima Barua Pandey and niece of filmmaker Pramathesh Barua of Devdas fame.

== Early life ==
Parbarti was born as one of nine children to late Prakritish Barua, the last in line of the Rajas of Gauripur, Dhubri. Since childhood she had a keen sense of understanding and interest in elephants and spent much of her time in the jungles along with her father. Prakritish was an eccentric hunter and had a supernatural understanding of elephants and had 40 elephants in his royal stables.

He used to take his family on extended trips in the forests with a large entourage that included servants, cooks and a private tutor for his children and his family which consisted of his four wives and nine children. It is on these trips that in the words of Parbati herself, she partly developed her interest in elephants. In 1970, the abolition of privy purse dealt a heavy blow to Parbati and her family.

Not entitled to any of the tax-free regimes and money allotted to them, the line of Rajas of Gauripur came to an end, both in terms of power and benefits. Being essentially broke with nothing but his palace and his stable of elephants remaining, Prakritish with his daughter returned to the forests and survived by selling elephants and providing their services to timber businesses directly or through the Sonepur Fair.

At the age of 14, Barua caught her first wild elephant on which her father congratulated her. Since then, she has mastered the art of rounding up elephants and capturing them to be domesticated. Over the years, she has been called multiple times in the jungles, tea plantations and rural areas of West Bengal, Odisha and her native Assam to capture or take care of wild elephants.

== Awards ==
- 2024: Awarded the Padma Shri in the field of Social Work.

== See also ==
- Mela shikar
