= Goalpariya Lokogeet =

Folk music of Goalpara

Goalpariya Lokogeet is a folk music of Goalpara, sung to traditional lyrics. It is sung by goalpariya language speaking people. It was primarily Pratima Barua Pandey, who raised the profile of this hitherto unknown genre of music nationally in India. This genre of music is being kept alive by the Koch Rajbongshi and Deshi community in their music festivals. Currently, albums of Goalpariya songs are released commercially; and Goalpariya musical motifs and instruments are increasingly used in popular music in India. Some noted singers are Bina Das Borthakur, Mini Bhattacharya, Nazmul Hoque, Allauddin Sarkar, Hamida Sarkar, Abdul Jabber, Rahima Begum Kalita, Ayaan Anisur Etc.

== Variants ==
Goalpariya lokgeet refers to the lyrical songs of Goalpara that are not associated with religious or rituals. Love is the primary theme of these compositions, but not exclusively. There are various subgenres of this music that differ in the musical mood and themes, of which the bhawaiya and the chatka are principal forms, beside moishali and maut songs. These songs are often sung in chorus, but they are suited as solos sung to the sole accompaniment of the dotora.

=== Bhawaiya ===
These are songs of love and longing, with the name rooted in the Sanskrit word bhava. They are steeped in seriousness, and the tunes have a plaintive air to them. Love in bhawaiya songs is not tender and romantic; instead the songs express a longing for a husband or a lover.

=== Chatka ===
The chatka songs, in contrast to bhawaiya, are themed not solely on love, and does not have the plaintive seriousness. Instead, they are direct and often flippantly casual. They often depict a special dewar-bhauji relationship, extra-marital relationships and situations.

== See also ==
- Kamrupi Lokgeet
- Tor Bade Pran Kande
- Goalpariya Hero
