= Lars Jacobsson =

Lars Jacobsson may refer to:

- Lars Jacobsson (footballer) (born 1960), Swedish football manager and player
- Lars Valentin Jacobsson (born 1965), Swedish entrepreneur

== See also ==
- Lars Jakobsen (born 1961), Danish footballer
- Lars Jacobsen (born 1979), Danish footballer
