= Khudimari =

- village
- Location in Assam, India Khudimari (India)
- Coordinates: 26.08°N 89.97°E
- Country: India
- State: Assam
- District: Dhubri
- Elevation: 26 m (85 ft)

Languages
  - Official: Assamese
- Time zone: UTC+5:30 (IST)
- Vehicle registration: AS

Khudimari is a small village in the Dhubri district of Assam, northeast India. It is located some distance away from the town called Gauripur. The Khudimari river flows right through the village.

== Demographics ==
The people of Khudimari speak Goalpariya, which is a dialect of Assamese. The people belong both to Hinduism and Islam and they have lived harmoniously since ages.

Historically, the local economy relied primarily on agriculture, with rice serving as the main subsistence and commercial crop. In recent years, employment patterns have shifted as younger demographics seek non-agricultural occupations in surrounding urban centers..

== Education ==
Khudimari has a primary school called the Khudimari M.V. School.

Education holds a significant place in the culture of the village, with many of the residents being teachers at the local school and also in the High School at nearby Gauripur town. The education scenario was particularly encouraging in the 1960s. However, the level has fallen since. Only very recently (2006–07) education in the village received a shot in the arm with a government grant to the M.V. School.

== Culture and sport ==
Sports and cultural activities, too, hold a special place in the village. The nerve center of all such activity is the local club, named the Udayan Sangha (translated into English: Sunrise Club) and established in the early 1960s. Every year, during Autumn, the festival of Durga Puja is held with great enthusiasm by the club. Traditional dance competition Arati is a big attraction of these festivities. The entire village celebrates this festival under the aegis of the Udayan Sangha as one whole united family. The Durga Puja celebrations of Udayan Sangha had its silver jubilee year in 1992.

The sports activities to come under the purview of the club. Until recently, the village boasted of one of the best volleyball teams in the district. The crowning glory came when this team defeated the "Rest of Gauripur" team in the early 1990s.
