= Elspeth Howe =

British peer (1932–2022)

The Right Honourable The Baroness Howe of Idlicote CBE
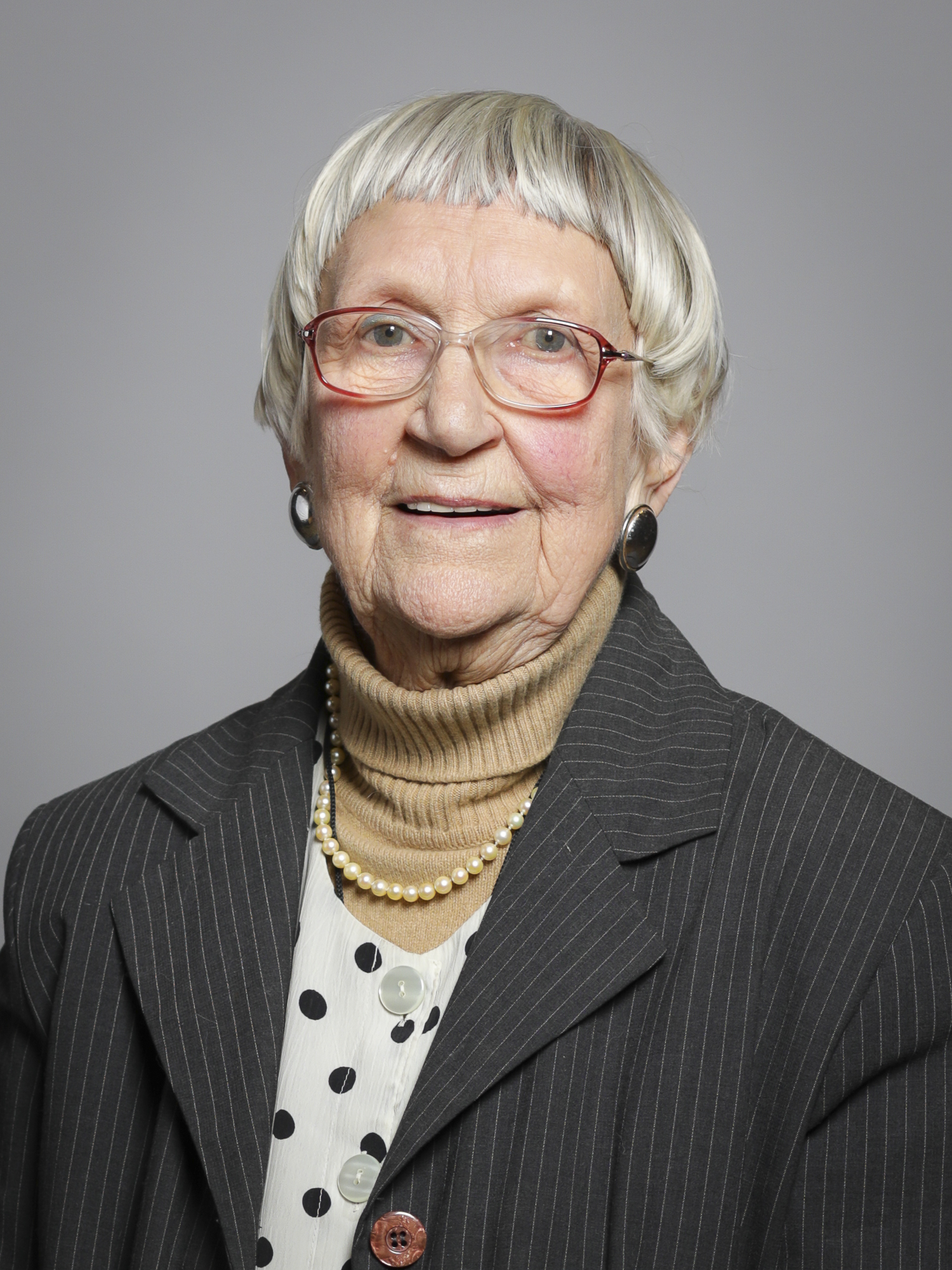
- Official portrait, 2019

Member of the House of Lords
- Lord Temporal
- Life peerage 29 June 2001 – 2 June 2020

Personal details
- Born: Elspeth Rosamund Morton Shand; 8 February 1932 Marylebone, London, England
- Died: 22 March 2022 (aged 90) Idlicote, Warwickshire, England
- Party: Crossbencher
- Spouse: The Lord Howe of Aberavon (m. 1953; died 2015)
- Children: 3
- Parent: Philip Morton Shand (father)
- Relatives: Bruce Shand (half-brother); Queen Camilla (half-niece)
- Education: Wycombe Abbey; London School of Economics

Elspeth Rosamund Morton Howe, Baroness Howe of Idlicote, CBE (née Shand; 8 February 1932 – 22 March 2022) was a British life peer and crossbench member of the House of Lords (2001–2020) who served in many capacities in public life.

As the widow of Geoffrey Howe, she was formerly known as Lady Howe of Aberavon before receiving a peerage in her own right.

She was the paternal half-aunt of Queen Camilla.

== Early life ==
Born Elspeth R. M. Shand in Marylebone, London, she was the daughter of the writer Philip Morton Shand by his fourth wife, Sybil Mary Shand (née Sissons, formerly Slee).

As such, she was a half-aunt to Queen Camilla (née Shand, formerly Parker Bowles), whose father, Bruce Shand, was son of Philip Morton Shand by a previous marriage. She grew up in Bath, Somerset, and was educated at Wycombe Abbey, a private school for girls, and at the London School of Economics.

She married the rising politician Geoffrey Howe in 1953, and had three children.

== Career ==
Howe was deputy chairman of the Equal Opportunities Commission from 1975 to 1979, and worked in other capacities from 1980. She was later chair of the Broadcasting Standards Commission. In the 1999 New Year Honours she was appointed a Commander of the Order of the British Empire (CBE).

Lady Howe was a Justice of the Peace in Inner London from 1964 until her retirement from the Bench in 2002. She sat in the Youth Court at Camberwell where she was a bench chairman.

On 29 June 2001, at the age of 69, she was made a life peer, as Baroness Howe of Idlicote, of Shipston-on-Stour in the County of Warwickshire, in her own right, becoming one of the first People's Peers. She and her husband Geoffrey Howe were one of the few couples each of whom held a peerage in their own right.

Having already been styled Lady Howe by dint of her husband's knighthood and then his peerage, it was quipped when she received her own peerage that she was "once, twice, three times a Lady".

Howe retired from Parliament on 2 June 2020.

== Death ==
Elspeth Howe, Baroness Howe of Idlicote died at her home in Idlicote, Warwickshire, on 22 March 2022, aged 90, having had cancer.

== Arms ==
Coat of arms of Elspeth Howe
Coronet Coronet of a Baron Escutcheon Arms of her husband Geoffrey Howe (Chequy Or and Azure on a chief per pale Vert and Gules a portcullis chained Gold.) with arms of her half brother (Azure a Boar's Head erased behind the ears Argent armed and langued Or on a Chief engrailed Argent between two Mullets Gules a Cross crosslet fitchy Sable) Supporters Dexter a dragon Gules armed and langued Azure gorged with a collar compony Sable and Argent the Sable charged with a crescent Ermine the Argent with a rose Gules barbed and seeded Proper holding in its exterior foreclaw a sword erect Argent hilt pommel and quillons Or sinister a winged lion Or armed and langued Gules similarly gorged resting its interior hind leg upon a clarion also Gold. Orders The Order of the British Empire ribbon. For God & Country
