= Aaron Simpson (entrepreneur) =

British entrepreneur and former film producer

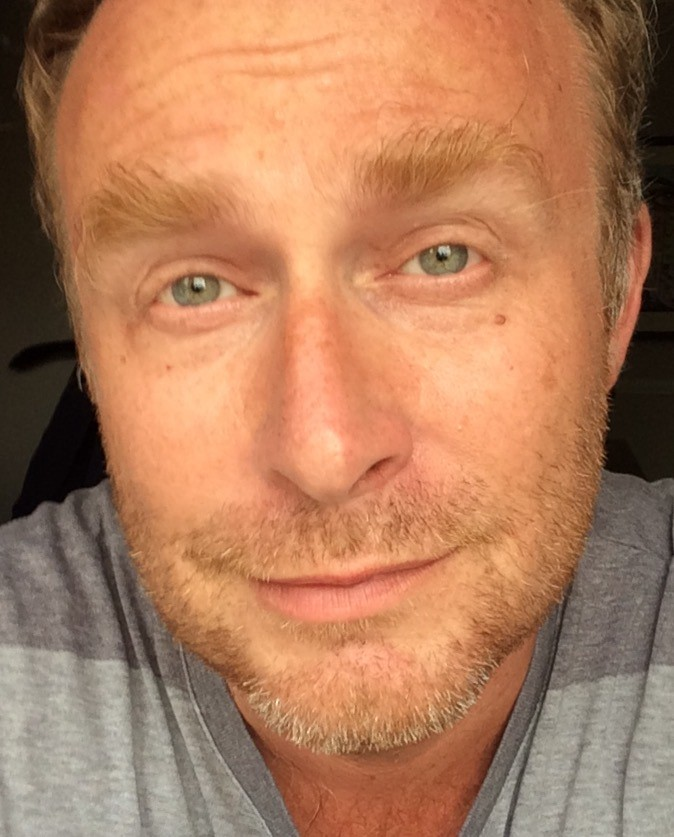
- Aaron Simpson in 2005.
- Born: 6 January 1972 (age 54); Leigh-on-Sea, Essex, England
- Education: Oxford University
- Occupations: Executive Chairman, Quintessentially & Founder, Kindred.co
- Years active: 19
- Organization(s): Quintessentially.com & Kindred.co
- Known for: Founding Quintessentially

Aaron Simpson (born 6 January 1972) is a British businessman, entrepreneur and former film producer. He is the co-founder and executive chairman of Quintessentially Group, an international members-only lifestyle management company and concierge group. Simpson is also a founding trustee of the Quintessentially Foundation. A former film producer, Simpson has worked with Scala Films, Rocket Pictures and he founded his own company, Flashlight Films.

== Early life and education ==
Simpson was born in Leigh-on-Sea, Essex, England, the son of teacher and shoe manufacturer. Simpson was educated at Oxford University. He studied geography and achieved a 2:1. He was elected Steward at St Edmund Hall. He founded the Oxford and Cambridge Shakespearian Festivals producing over 300 plays in those university towns.

== Career ==
=== Early career ===
Simpson worked in film production as an assistant photocopier for Steven Woolley's Scala Films, the production company behind Interview with the Vampire and the Oscar-winning The Crying Game. After a year with the production company, Simpson was promoted to head of development. Later, Simpson began working as a producer at Elton John's Rocket Pictures before starting his own production company, Flashlight Films.

=== Quintessentially ===
Simpson co-founded Quintessentially Group in 2000 with Ben Elliot and Paul Drummond. Simpson serves as the group executive chairman. Simpson and Drummond met at Oxford and started the company with Elliot as a small, London-based concierge service. Since then, Quintessentially Group has expanded to 78 countries with over 1,500 employees and 33 sister businesses. In 2017, Simpson began work on the "world's biggest superyacht", the Quintessentially One, backed by five billionaire investors. The 722-foot yacht is scheduled to launch in 2019.

== Other activities ==
In 2014, Simpson started an online investment platform with David Mickler and Lex Deak called Q Ventures, which has raised over £50m in capital for new ventures.

== Personal life ==
Simpson is married and has two daughters. He and his family live between London and Ibiza, Spain.

== See also ==
- Ben Elliot
