= Adoption & Fostering =

Academic journal

- Discipline: Adoption, foster care
- Language: English
- Edited by: Miranda Davies, Managing Editor

Publication details
- History: 1977–present
- Publisher: SAGE Publications on behalf of Coram BAAF
- Frequency: Quarterly

Standard abbreviations
- ISO 4: Adopt. Foster.

Indexing
- ISSN: 0308-5759 (print); 1740-469X (web)
- LCCN: 76647341
- OCLC no.: 55133175

Links
- Journal homepage; Online access; Online archive

Adoption & Fostering is a quarterly peer-reviewed academic journal covering research on adoption and foster care. It was established in 1977 and is published by SAGE Publications on behalf of Coram BAAF. Miranda Davies is its Managing Editor.

== Abstracting and indexing ==
The journal is abstracted and indexed in:

- Academic OneFile
- Applied Social Sciences Index & Abstracts
- British Nursing Index
- Child Development & Adolescent Studies
- CINAHL
- Dietrich's Index Philosophicus
- Family & Society Studies Worldwide
- International Bibliography of Periodical Literature
- InfoTrac
- Social Services Abstracts
- SocINDEX
- Sociological Abstracts
- TOC Premier
