= Gauripur, India =

Gauripur
- Town
- Ganesh Temple of Gauripur

- Location in Assam, India Gauripur (India)
- Coordinates: 26.08°N 89.97°E
- Country: India
- State: Assam
- District: Dhubri

Government
  - Body: Gauripur Town Committee
- Elevation: 26 m (85 ft)

Population (2011)
  - Total: 25,124
- Time zone: UTC+5:30 (IST)
- ISO 3166 code: IN-AS
- Vehicle registration: AS
- Website: gauripurmb.org

Gauripur (IPA: ˈgɑʊrɪˌpʊə or ˈgɔːrɪˌpʊə) is a semi-urban town under Gauripur Town Committee in the Dhubri district in the state of Assam, India.

== Geography ==
Gauripur's average elevation is 26 metres (85 feet). The nearest airport is at Rupsi, adjacent to the village Khudimari.

== Demographics ==
As of 2011 India census, Gauripur had a population of 25,124. Males constitute 52% of the population and females 48%. Gauripur has an average literacy rate of 75%, higher than the national average of 59.5%, with male literacy at 81%, and female literacy at 69%. In Gauripur, 11% of the population is under six years of age.

== Politics ==
Gauripur is part of Dhubri (Lok Sabha constituency).

== Transport ==
Gauripur Railway Station (GUP2) serves the town. The railway station lies under the Alipurduar railway division of the Northeast Frontier Railway zone.

== Places of Interest ==
- Matiabag Palace, also known as Gauripur Rajbari

== Notable people ==
- Pramathesh Barua, actor, director, and screenwriter
- Pratima Barua Pandey, prominent folk singer
- Rebati Mohan Dutta Choudhury, noted Assamese litterateur
- Parbati Barua, animal conservation activist
