= Ben Elliot =

British businessman (born 1975)

Sir Ben Elliot

Chairman of the Conservative Party
- In office 24 July 2019 – 5 September 2022 Serving with James Cleverly (2019–2020); Amanda Milling (2020–2021); Oliver Dowden (2021–2022); Andrew Stephenson (2022)
- Deputy: Helen Whately; Paul Scully; Ranil Jayawardena; Lee Rowley; Justin Tomlinson; Matt Vickers
- Leader: Boris Johnson
- Preceded by: Brandon Lewis
- Succeeded by: Jake Berry

Personal details
- Born: Benjamin William Elliot; 11 August 1975 (age 51) Dorset, England
- Party: Conservative
- Spouse: Mary-Clare Winwood (m. 2011)
- Children: 2
- Parents: Simon Elliot (father); Annabel Shand (mother)
- Relatives: Queen Camilla (aunt); Charles III (uncle-by-marriage); Mark Shand (uncle); Bruce Shand (maternal grandfather); Rosalind Shand (maternal grandmother); Steve Winwood (father-in-law)
- Education: Eton College
- Alma mater: University of Bristol (BSc)

Sir Benjamin William Elliot (born 11 August 1975) is a British businessman and fund-raiser for the Conservative Party who served as Co-chairman of the Conservative Party from July 2019 alongside James Cleverly (2019–2020), Amanda Milling (2020–2021), Oliver Dowden (2021–2022), and Andrew Stephenson (2022) before resigning on 5 September 2022. In 2018, Elliot was appointed by Michael Gove, the Secretary of State for the Environment, as the UK government's first Food Surplus and Waste Champion. Elliot is the co-founder of the Quintessentially Group, a global luxury concierge service, and the co-founder of Hawthorn Advisors, a communications consultancy based in London. He is a nephew of Queen Camilla.

== Early life ==
Elliot was born and raised in Dorset, England. He is the son of Simon Elliot, a Dorset landowner, and Annabel Elliot (née Shand), an interior designer and antiques dealer. He has two sisters. His mother is the sister of Queen Camilla and Mark Shand. His paternal grandparents were Air Chief Marshal Sir William Elliot and Rosemary Chancellor, daughter of Sir John Chancellor. His maternal grandparents were Major Bruce Shand and the Hon. Rosalind Cubitt. Elliot was educated at Eton College and the University of Bristol, graduating with a BSc in Politics and Economics.

== Career ==
Elliot is the co-founder of Quintessentially Group, a luxury lifestyle group with a 24-hour global concierge service, which he started in London in December 2000. The company has boasted about how it serves wealthy Russian clients, which includes opening an office in Russia and creating a "dedicated Russian team". After Russia invaded Ukraine in 2022, the company deleted its webpage that boasted about serving Russian elite clients.

He is a regular contributor to the Financial Times, The New York Times and Country Life amongst other publications. Elliot was included in the Evening Standard's Progress 1000 list, named as one of 'London's most influential people 2016 - Business Brains'. He was the executive producer of the award-winning documentary Fire in Babylon.

Elliot acted as treasurer for the Conservative Party's 2016 London mayoral campaign for Zac Goldsmith (first-cousin of Elliot's aunt Clio Goldsmith) and was responsible for all campaign fundraising efforts. Elliot acts as a trustee for the Eranda Rothschild Foundation and has been Chairman of the Philanthropy Board of the Royal Albert Hall since 2015. In December 2016, he was appointed as a trustee to the board of the Victoria and Albert Museum by Prime Minister Theresa May. The four-year term officially commenced on 1 January 2017. Following October 2017's relaunch of the Centre for Policy Studies, Elliot was asked by Lord Saatchi to join his board as honorary treasurer.

In December 2018, Elliot was appointed by Michael Gove, the secretary of state for environment, food and rural affairs, as the government's first Food Surplus and Waste Champion. Following Elliot's appointment, Gove commented: "Food waste is an economic, environmental and moral scandal. We must end it. That's why I am delighted Ben Elliot is taking up this position and know he will bring the enthusiasm and skills this important role needs. His first task will be to help ensure our £15 million food waste fund redistributes surplus food that would otherwise be wasted to those most in need."

In July 2019, Elliot was appointed by incoming Prime Minister Boris Johnson as the co-chairman of the Conservative Party, working alongside fellow co-chairman James Cleverly. Cleverly was demoted to become a joint Foreign Office and Department for International Development minister in the 2020 cabinet reshuffle and was replaced as chairman by Amanda Milling. Milling was succeeded by Oliver Dowden in the 2021 cabinet reshuffle. Dowden resigned in June 2022.

Elliot is a founding trustee of the Quintessentially Foundation charity, which has raised in excess of £13 million for charitable causes since 2008.

In 2021, BBC News described Elliot as the "Tories' chief fundraiser". He raised nearly £2 million from donors with links to the Vladimir Putin regime in Russia.

== Personal life ==
Elliot married Mary-Clare Winwood, US-born daughter of the musician Steve Winwood, in Gloucestershire in 2011. They have two sons and live in West London. Elliot is a member of 5 Hertford Street, a private members' club in Mayfair, London. His son Arthur was a page of honour to his great aunt, Queen Camilla, at her coronation on 6 May 2023. Later that year Elliot, along with his mother and wife, was invited to ride in the King's procession at Royal Ascot.

== Honours ==
Elliot was appointed a Knight Bachelor on 9 June 2023 as part of the 2022 Prime Minister's Resignation Honours.

Party political offices
Preceded by Brandon Lewis	Chairman of the Conservative Party; 2019–2022; With: James Cleverly (2019–2020); Amanda Milling (2020–2021); Oliver Dowden (2021–2022)	Succeeded by Jake Berry
