= Rebati Mohan Dutta Choudhury =

- Born: 1924; Gauripur; Dhubri, Assam
- Died: 29 February 2008 (aged 83–84); Guwahati, Assam
- Education: Carmichael College; Calcutta University
- Occupations: Lecturer; Writer; News-editor; Tea garden-Manager
- Spouse: Nalini Dutta Choudhury
- Writing career
- Pen name: Shilabhadra
- Language: Assamese
- Period: 1964–2008
- Notable work: Modhupur Bohudoor
- Notable awards: 1994: Sahitya Akademi Award; 1990: Bharatiya Bhasa Parishad Award; 1990: Assam Publication Board Award; 2001: Assam Valley literary Award

Rebati Mohan Dutta Choudhury (1924 – 29 February 2008) was a noted Assamese litterateur, Sahitya Akademi Award winner and an academic from Gauripur in Assam, India. Popularly he is known as Sheelabhadra, his pen name.

== Early life and education ==
Born in 1924 at Gauripur in Dhubri District, Dutta Choudhury pursued his graduation from Carmichael College, Rangpur (now in Bangladesh). He obtained his post-graduation in Pure Mathematics from Calcutta University in 1946, with a first class and silver medal.

== Career ==
After his post-graduated studies, he joined Cotton College, Guwahati as a lecturer in Mathematics. Subsequently, he became a contractor, a sub-editor with the Assam Tribune and assistant manager in a tea estate for some time and finally he restarted his teaching career in the Assam Engineering College, Guwahati in 1957 as a lecturer. And he retired in 1982 as a professor in mathematics.

He died on 29 February 2008 at a hospital in Guwahati.

== Literary works ==
Dutta Choudhury's major literary works are Madhupur aru Tarangini, Agomonir Ghat, Anahatguri, Abichinna, Prachir, Godhuli and Anusandhan (all novels) and Baastab, Beer Sainik, Samudrateer, Tarua Kadam, Pratiksha, Uttaran, Mezaz, Sheelabhadrar Kuria Galpa, Nirbachita Galpa, Madhupurar Madhukar, Anya ek Madhupur, Uttar Nai, Dayitya aru Anyanya Galpa, Biswas aru Anyanya Galpa, Lagaria and several other collections of short stories. Many of his literary works have been translated into Hindi, Bengali, Punjabi, Telugu and Oriya by the National Book Trust, the Sahitya Akademi and the Bharatiya Jnanpith. Smriticharan is his autobiography.

=== Novels ===
1. Madhupur aru Trangini (1971)
2. Agamonir Ghat (1973)
3. Aahotguri (1973)
4. Abichinna (1980)
5. Prachir (1980)
6. Godhuli (1981)
7. Anuhondhan (1987)

=== Short story collections ===
1. Bastob
2. Kunu Khyov Nai
3. Homudra Teer
4. Bir Hoinik
5. Shilovhodror Kurita Golpo
6. Mejaz
7. Rotubabur Garage
8. Protikhya
9. Uttoron
10. Bishwakh aru Anyanyo Golpo
11. Dwayitto aru Anyanyo Golpo
12. Jibon aru Anyano Golpo
13. Durgoto aru Anyanyo Golpo
14. Cithi aru Anyanyo Golpo
15. Akou Modhupur
16. Madhupur Bohudur
17. Torpon
18. Nirbachito Golpo
19. Logoriya
20. Anyo Ek Modhupur
21. Modhupuror Modhukor
22. Apun Manuh
23. Jibonor Rong
24. Hayahno
25. Uttor Nai

=== Autobiography ===
1. Smriticharon
2. Madhupuror Smriti
3. Atitor Khondito Chitro

== Awards and honours ==
Dutta Choudhury was honoured with the 1994 Sahitya Akademi Award in Assamese for his short stories collection, Madhupur Bahudur, the Assam Valley Literary Award in 2001, the Bharatiya Bhasa Parishad award in 1990 and the Assam Publication Board award in the same year.
