= British Association for Adoption and Fostering =

The British Association for Adoption and Fostering (BAAF) (until 2001, British Agencies for Adoption and Fostering) was a registered charity, originating as the Standing Conference of Societies Registered for Adoption in 1950, which formalised itself into the Association of British Adoption Agencies (ABAA) in 1970.

In 1975, the association voted to add the word 'Fostering' to its name to recognise the increasing importance of fostering, in response to growing awareness of the damaging impact of long-term care on children and concomitant decline on the supply of babies for adoption in the wake of the Abortion Act 1967, and other social and policy changes such as increased use of contraception and declining stigma regarding illegitimacy.

In 1978, a separate organisation, Adoption Resource Exchange, was formed as a limited guarantee company by a group of social work professionals, which in 1980 merged with the Association of British Adoption and Fostering Agencies to form BAAF.

In addition to adoption and fostering agencies, membership was later open to organisations and individuals concerned with child adoption and fostering (in a non-voting capacity). Corporate members included local authorities, NHS trusts, law firms and voluntary organisations. Individual members included social workers, health professionals, law professionals, adopters and foster carers. BAAF's 2013–14 annual review reported a corporate membership of more than 450 and 1400 individual members.

On 31 July 2015 the board of trustees announced the immediate closure of the charity. In a vague explanation it cited "significant changes and prevailing economic conditions" as the reasons for the surprising and sudden closure. The charity was insolvent and in administration. Some of BAAF's functions in England were transferred to the children's charity Coram, with a new entity to be created named CoramBAAF Adoption and Fostering Academy.

Following the closure a former chief executive and acting chief executive, and a group of former staff members, made separate requests to the Charity Commission for an investigation. According to the Civil Society Governance website, "The (former) letter is believed to suggest that the regulator’s guidance for struggling charities was not adhered to in the months before the collapse, and that more could have been done to keep the BAAF from closing".

According to the Children & Young People Now publication, Anthony Douglas, the chief executive of CAFCASS who chaired the BAAF board of trustees, "declined to comment" on his board's decision to close the charity.

Following the closure of BAAF the Adoption & Fostering Alliance Scotland and the Association for Adoption and Fostering Cymru were formed in Scotland and Wales respectively, with funding from the Scottish and Welsh governments, to continue the work of BAAF in those jurisdictions.

== BAAF services ==
Until its closure BAAF was a membership association, publisher, training provider and advisory service. In cooperation with SAGE Publications it published the academic journal Adoption & Fostering. Post-qualifying training was delivered in partnership with Sheffield Hallam University in England, with Stirling University in Scotland and with QUB in Northern Ireland.

BAAF also ran the Be My Parent family-finding service consisting of the www.bemyparent.org.uk Web site and Be My Parent newspaper. Both Be My Parent services featured children who need an adoptive or permanent foster family. The Web site also offered information, articles and real-life stories about adoption and fostering.

== Contracted services ==
BAAF managed the Adoption Register for England and Wales, under contract with the UK and Wales governments, Scotland's Adoption Register, which is funded by the Scottish Government, and the Adoption Regional Information System for Northern Ireland (ARIS) for the Northern Ireland Executive. These registers maintain records of children waiting to be adopted and of approved prospective adopters awaiting an adoptive placement.

BAAF operated the Independent Review Mechanisms (IRM) in England and Wales, on behalf of the UK and Wales governments respectively. The IRMs review the decisions of adoption and fostering agencies on their approval of adopters and foster carers, and on disclosure of adoption records.

== Public policy and public information ==
BAAF worked to increase public understanding of child adoption and fostering. And it lobbied for reform where necessary. It had campaigned for unmarried couples, including same-sex couples, to be allowed to adopt jointly, for the right of adopted people and people who were donor conceived to receive information about their birth families, and for foster children to be able stay in care after the age of 18.

BAAF ran National Adoption Week, which is dedicated to finding families for those children who wait the longest, and Somebody Else’s Child, the first national campaign on private fostering.

In 2011 BAAF also supported the launch of a publication designed to improve fostering outcomes for Muslim children in care. The guide, Foster Carers Caring for Muslim Children, was developed by the community development charity Mercy Mission UK with a national consultation with children, carers, professionals and supervisory support from BAAF.

== Management ==
In December 2014, Caroline Selkirk became the new Chief Executive. BAAF had advertised for a "visionary" Chief Executive at a salary of up to £100,000. Seven months later the charity she led had ceased to exist.

Selkirk was previously employed by NHS Tayside as Deputy Chief Executive from May 2011. She started her career as a state registered chiropodist working in England and Scotland before undertaking an MSc in Health Promotion and Health Education. She worked in a number of health promotion and management positions in the southern England. In 1994 she moved to West Sussex Health Authority as Contracts Manager and subsequently became Assistant Director of Performance Management. In 2000 Selkirk returned to Scotland and was appointed Assistant Director of Planning at NHS Tayside. She was appointed Director of Change and Innovation in 2003.

Selkirk replaced Barbara Hutchinson who had the position of Interim Chief Executive. Hutchinson is a former Deputy Chief Executive of BAAF. She returned to BAAF from retirement to take up the interim position on 30 May 2014. This followed the departure of Srabani Sen who was Chief Executive from December 2013 until May 2014. Sen left BAAF so soon after her appointment to "pursue exciting opportunities that have emerged recently". Sen's LinkedIn profile subsequently reported that she was the Director of Lead for Change, which "works with organisations to give them a competitive edge and a sustainable future by embedding the needs and aspirations of their clients and service users into their strategy, leadership and governance".

The Board of Trustees was chaired by Anthony Douglas who is Chief Executive of CAFCASS, the Children and Family Court Advisory and Support Service.

== Revenue ==
BAAF raised revenue from membership fees, the sale of its publications and services, fees for its public contracts, and through charitable donations. In 2010 it controversially accepted a £100,000 grant from Ladbrokes, the bookmaker.

== Patrons ==
BAAF's President was Rupert Hambro. Patrons included: Elizabeth Butler-Sloss; Nicky Campbell, presenter of BBC Radio 5 Live, who was adopted; hairdresser Andrew Barton; interior designer Annabel Elliot; singer and actress Clare Grogan; and Nimmy March.

In 2014 Butler-Sloss withdrew as head of an inquiry into child sex abuse. This followed an allegation that in a previous review “she wanted to exclude some of his allegations in a bid to protect the Church of England” according to the BBC, because she "cared very much about the Church".

== Archives ==
- Catalogue of the papers of the British Association for Adoption and Fostering held at LSE Archives
