= Annabel Elliot =

English interior designer and antiques dealer (born 1949)

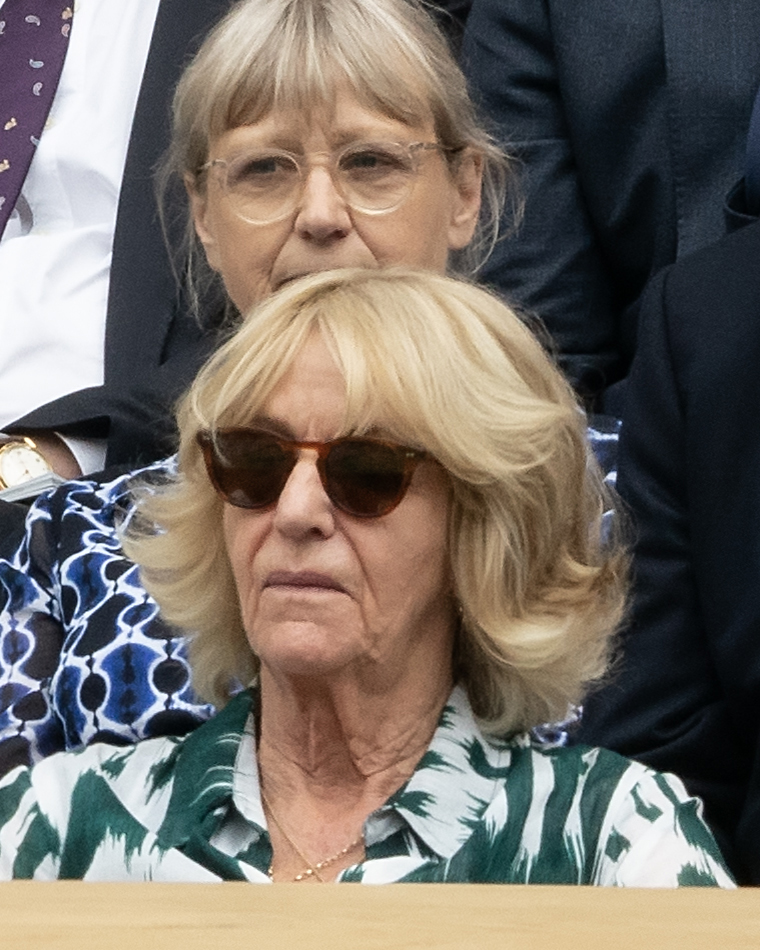
- Elliott in 2023
- Born: Sonia Annabel Shand; 2 February 1949 (age 77); Lambeth, London, England
- Occupations: Interior designer, antiques dealer
- Spouse: Simon Elliot (m. 1972; died 2023)
- Children: 3, including Ben
- Parents: Bruce Shand (father); Rosalind Cubitt (mother)
- Relatives: Queen Camilla (sister); Mark Shand (brother); King Charles III (brother-in-law)

Sonia Annabel Elliot (née Shand; born 2 February 1949) is a British interior designer, antiques dealer, and courtier. She is the founder of Annabel Elliot Interior Design and Antiques and has undertaken extensive design work for King Charles III, including projects for the Duchy of Cornwall and several royal estates. Elliot has been recognised within the interiors industry and ranked among Britain's most influential female designers. She has supported various charities, including the British Association for Adoption and Fostering and the Elephant Family. She is the sister of Queen Camilla, the mother of Conservative politician Sir Ben Elliot, and serves as one of the Queen's companions in the Royal Household.

== Early and personal life ==
Sonia Annabel Shand was born on 2 February 1949, the second daughter of Major Bruce Shand (1917–2006) and his wife, The Honourable Rosalind Cubitt (1921–1994), daughter of the 3rd Baron Ashcombe and Sonia Rosemary Keppel. Her elder sister is Queen Camilla (born 1947), and her brother was the travel writer Mark Shand (1951–2014). Shand later studied fine art in Florence, Italy.

On 27 April 1972, at the age of 23, Shand married Simon Elliot (1940–2023), a Dorset landowner and the son of Air Chief Marshal Sir William Elliot and Rosemary Chancellor. The couple had three children, including Sir Ben Elliot, a former Co-Chairman of the Conservative Party.

== Career ==
Elliot is the founder of Annabel Elliot Interior Design and Antiques, based in Dorset. The business has been operating for 30 years. She is also the co-founder of Talisman, an antiques and interiors emporium located in Gillingham. Her daughter Alice and son-in-law Luke Irwin are likewise interior designers and antiques dealers.

Elliot has undertaken work for her brother‑in‑law, King Charles III, serving as the chief interior designer for his estates. She initially worked on the renovation of properties within the Duchy of Cornwall. Her projects included the interiors of 12 Duchy of Cornwall cottages on the Isles of Scilly, holiday cottages at Restormel Castle, and work on the King's Welsh estate at Llwynywermod.

In 2011, Elliot renovated Bovey Castle Hotel in Devon, receiving positive recognition for her work. The hotel was included in the 2011 Gold List of the world's best places to stay. That same year, she contributed to the furnishing of the new sustainable building at the Duchy Nursery in Lostwithiel, Cornwall.

Elliot furnished Dumfries Lodge House in Ayrshire, Scotland, which was opened for business by Charles in 2012. She also furnished the Highgrove House Shops, which sell home and garden products. In 2016, she worked on the interiors of 20 bedrooms at the Duchess of Cornwall Inn in Poundbury, Dorset. In 2024, Elliot was involved in the refurbishment of the restaurant at Balmoral Castle. After being removed from the payroll of the Duchy of Cornwall by Prince William in 2024, it was reported in 2026 that she was being paid by The King's Foundation for "branding" and "retail" consultancy.

In 2014, The Daily Telegraph ranked Elliot as the fifth most influential female interior designer in Britain. In 2024, she appeared on Tatler's best-dressed list.

== Charity work ==
Elliot was a patron of the British Association for Adoption and Fostering (BAAF) from 2005 until its closure in 2015. She cited her mother, Rosalind, who worked for an adoption agency, as the influence behind her support for the organisation. She is also a life member and patron of the Elephant Family, of which her brother Mark served as chairman until his death in 2014.

== Lady-in-attendance ==
Elliot served as lady‑in‑attendance at Charles III and Camilla's coronation in 2023, and later that year she, along with her son and daughter‑in‑law, was invited to ride in the King's procession at Royal Ascot.

== Honours ==
Country	Date	Appointment	Ribbon
United Kingdom	6 May 2023	King Charles III Coronation Medal	
