= Lars Valentin Jacobsson =

Swedish entrepreneur (born 1965)

Lars Jacobsson
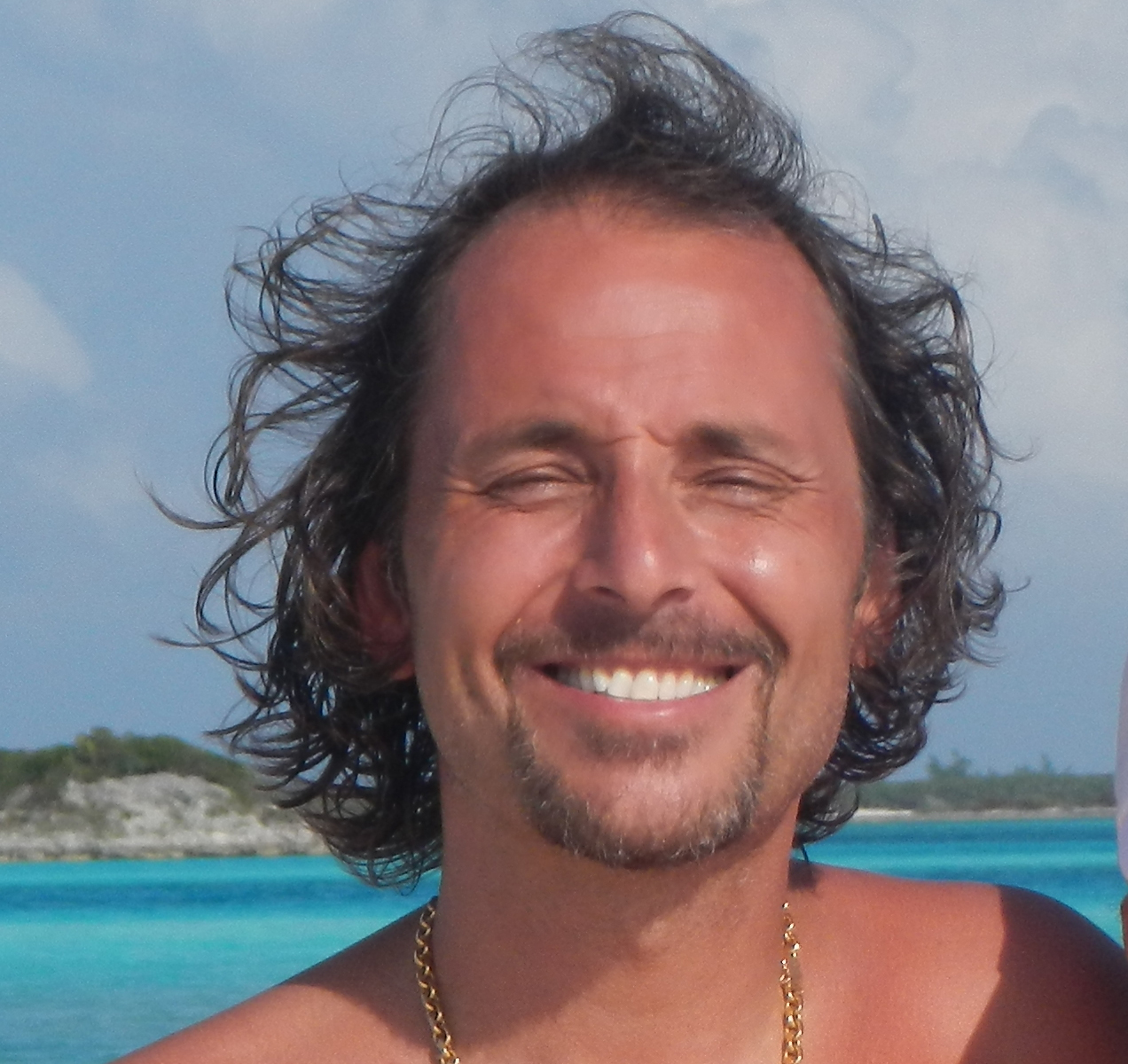
- Born: May 11, 1965 (age 61); Gothenburg, Sweden
- Citizenship: Swedish
- Education: IHM Business School
- Occupation: Entrepreneur
- Years active: 1985–present
- Known for: Oil industry Environmentalist
- Notable work: Founder of the Oil Contango
- Term: 25
- Movement: The Perfect World Foundation

Lars Jacobsson (born May 11, 1965) is a Swedish entrepreneur, inventor, philanthropist, and conservationist.

== Career ==
Jacobsson initially worked in the petroleum industry, where he was involved in starting up storage, trading and shipping companies, as well as being the inventor of the oil Contango market in the early 1990s.

In early 2000s he sold his oil related businesses. Since 2005, he started up two solar energy companies. In 2010, Jacobsson founded TEXEL Energy, a Sweden-based company which develops solar energy technology and other applications based around the Stirling engine. These are applications such as; Thermal Energy Storage (thermal battery), flare gas, waste and landfill gas recovery to electricity and also for integrated AI capacity.

In 2022, Jacobsson was appointed as an Expert Advisor for the European Union regarding large scale energy storage.

== Philanthropy ==
Together with his wife Ragnhild Jacobsson, he founded The Perfect World Foundation, a non-profit and independent Swedish based organisation that promotes conservation. In 2014 the organisation held the fundraising gala and wildlife and environmental conference in favour of the endangered rhinos and elephants, with participants from all over the world. Jacobbson and his wife are ambassadors at the London-based organisation Elephant Family to save the asian elephants.

On June 7, 2015, at a private event in Stockholm, Jacobsson and his wife, on behalf of The Perfect World Foundation, honored Jane Goodall with "The Fragile Rhino" prize along with naming her Conservationist of the Year for 2015.

In September 2016, they organised a fundraising event "Save The Elephant", a ball with participants from all over the world. During the event, Richard Leakey, behind the largest ivory burning ever in Kenya, was awarded "The Conservationist of the Year 2016" by the organisation's new ambassador, Sarah, Duchess of York.
