= Queen of the Elephants =

1996 book by Mark Sh

- Author: Mark Shand
- Language: English
- Publisher: Vintage
- Publication date: 1996
- Publication place: United Kingdom
- Media type: Print (Hardcover)
- Pages: 208
- ISBN: 0099592010

Queen of the Elephants is a book written by the conservationist and travel writer Mark Shand in 1996. The book and the BBC documentary Queen of the Elephants which was adapted from it were based on the life of the first female mahout in recent times—Parbati Barua of Kaziranga. The book went on to win the Prix Litteraire d'Amis award and the Thomas Cook Travel Book Award.
