= Tor Bade Pran Kande =

- Directed by: Robin Chandra Roy
- Written by: Robin Chandra Roy
- Produced by: Robin Chandra Roy
- Starring: Azibur Rahman; Tumpa Roy; Ayaan Anisur; Rupa Khatun
- Cinematography: Kanak
- Music by: Sarajit Sharma
- Production company: Tri Nayan Production
- Release date: 15 October 2008
- Running time: 73 minutes
- Country: India
- Language: Goalpariya

Tor Bade Pran Kande (Assamese: তোৰ বাদে প্ৰাণ কান্দে ) is a 2008 Indian Goalparia language romantic drama video film written and directed by Robin Ch Roy, starring Azibur Rahman, Rupa Khatun and Tumpa Roy in the lead roles with Nuruddin Mollah playing an important supporting role.

== Cast ==
- Azibur Rahman as Raju
- Tumpa as Aleya
- Rupa Khatun as Rupa
- Nuruddin Mollah as Aleya's Father
- Bappi Khan as Biki
- Monsur Ali as Guru
- Shahidur as Kalu
- Hosena as Village Girl
- Mohiruddin as Baul
- Bapi as Raju's friend
- Ayaan Anisur as Babu
