= The Laines =

Childhood home of Queen Camilla

Coordinates: 50.9025°N 0.0607°W

The Laines is an 18th-century country house in Plumpton, East Sussex, near Lewes in England. It was the childhood home of Queen Camilla and is a Grade II listed historic house.

== Description ==
Originally a rectory, the centre part was built in the 18th century, with 19th-century additions to the north and south. It was listed Grade II on the National Heritage List for England in 1979. The house stands in over five acres (2.0 ha) of grounds, with an orchard and a walled kitchen garden. There is a swimming pool, tennis court, paddock, and a separate four-bedroom cottage.

== Shand family ==
The Laines was the childhood home of Camilla Shand, the future consort of Charles III. Camilla has stated that her childhood there was "perfect in every way". The house had been purchased by her parents, British Army officer and businessman Major Bruce Shand and his wife, Rosalind Shand (née Cubitt), who also had a house in South Kensington, London. The Shands moved there after the Second World War so that they could be near Camilla's grandmother Sonia Cubitt. The Laines is believed to be where Bruce Shand asked the young Prince Charles about his intentions with regard to Camilla.

== Gardens ==
The gardens were redesigned by Lanning Roper for the Shands in the late 1960s, Roper worked on the gardens and offered advice to the Shands until 1982. Roper's work at The Laines was featured in the September 1982 issue of Country Life.

== Resale ==
The Shands lived at The Laines until Rosalind died in 1994, when the estate was sold to the English actor James Wilby. In 2014, The Laines was listed for sale at £3.25 million, the second time in 63 years that it was available to purchase. Wilby in turn, put it up for sale.
