= Bruce Shand =

British Army officer (1917–2006)

Major Bruce Shand MC DL
- Born: Bruce Middleton Hope Shand; 22 January 1917; London, England
- Died: 11 June 2006 (aged 89); Stourpaine, Dorset, England
- Spouse: Rosalind Cubitt (m. 1946; died 1994)
- Children: Camilla, Queen of the United Kingdom; Annabel Elliot; Mark Shand
- Relatives: Philip Morton Shand (father); Edith Marguerite Harrington (mother); Elspeth Howe (half-sister); Charles III (son-in-law)
- Military career
- Allegiance: United Kingdom
- Branch: British Army
- Service years: 1937–1947
- Rank: Major
- Commands: HQ Squadron, Half Squadron of 12th Lancers, "C" Squadron
- Conflicts: Second World War
- Awards: MC and bar
- Other work: Deputy Lieutenant of Sussex; Vice-Lieutenant of East Sussex; Exon and Adjutant of the Queen's Body Guard of the Yeomen of the Guard

Bruce Middleton Hope Shand (22 January 1917 – 11 June 2006) was a British Army officer who served in France as part of the British Expeditionary Force during the Second World War. He was the father of Queen Camilla.

After the war, he joined a firm of wine merchants. He was Vice-Lord-Lieutenant of East Sussex from 1974 until 1992 and was a Master of Foxhounds.

== Early life ==
Bruce Middleton Hope Shand was born in London into an upper-class landed gentry family whose ancestors had moved to England from Scotland.

He was the only son of Philip Morton Shand (1888–1960), an architectural writer and critic (from his first marriage). His father was a close friend of Walter Gropius and Le Corbusier and whose company, Finmar, imported furniture by Alvar Aalto to the United Kingdom. His mother was Edith Marguerite Harrington (1893–1981), later Mrs. Herbert Charles Tippet.

His parents divorced when he was three years old. His father went on to remarry three times. Shand did not see his father again until he was 18. One of his two half-sisters was Baroness Howe of Idlicote, wife of former Chancellor of the Exchequer and Deputy Prime Minister Lord Howe of Aberavon.

Shand's mother remarried Herbert Charles Tippet, a golf course designer. Contrary to some newspaper reports, young Shand was not abandoned by his mother and stepfather but was taken to live with them in Westbury, Long Island, New York, in 1921. He left out this fact from his autobiography, giving the erroneous impression of having been abandoned.

After visiting England in June 1923, Bruce and his mother returned to the US in September 1923 with the stated intent (according to US immigration records) of residing permanently in the United States and taking US citizenship. When he next returned to Britain it was to begin his education, organised and paid for by his grandparents. His mother and stepfather returned to Britain in 1927, then moved to Ireland in the 1930s. His stepfather died at Rye in 1947 and his mother died in Cooden Beach, Sussex, in 1981.

Shand was sent to France to learn French. He was educated at Rugby and Sandhurst and was commissioned into the 12th Lancers as a second lieutenant on 28 January 1937. He became a troop leader in "A" Squadron. His interests included fox hunting, polo and reading.

== Second World War ==
Shand was promoted to lieutenant on 28 January 1940. He served in France as part of the British Expeditionary Force. The 12th Lancers were equipped with lightly armed Morris armoured cars in a reconnaissance role. The regiment spent six months at Foncquevillers during the Phoney War, then advanced to the River Dyle and retreated in the face of the German blitzkrieg. He aided in covering the withdrawal to Dunkirk, from where he was evacuated back to England, arriving at Margate on 31 May 1940. For his actions, he was awarded an MC on 5 July 1940.

After a period with the regiment in Poole and in Reigate, and an interlude training the North Irish Horse in Northern Ireland, Shand was sent with the regiment to North Africa in September 1941 as part of the 7th Armoured Division, where he was promoted to the temporary rank of captain. He earned his second MC in January 1942, covering the withdrawal of armoured cars of the 6th Rajputana Rifles in the face of a strong counterattack by the German Afrika Corps. The award was gazetted on 9 July of that year.

He met Winston Churchill shortly before the Second Battle of El Alamein. On 6 November 1942, on a probe towards Marsa Matruh, his vehicle was surrounded and destroyed. Shand's two crewmen were killed, and he was wounded. He was captured and taken to Germany as a prisoner of war. After treatment in Athens, he was held at Oflag IX A in Spangenberg Castle; he escaped when the Germans evacuated the castle and marched the prisoners further from Allied forces. While a prisoner of war, he was promoted to the rank of war-substantive captain and to the substantive rank of captain on 28 January 1945.

== After the war ==
After his liberation in 1945, Shand returned to England. On 2 January 1946, he married the Hon. Rosalind Maud Cubitt, daughter of Roland Cubitt, 3rd Baron Ashcombe, and Sonia Rosemary Keppel, at St Paul's Church, Knightsbridge. They had two daughters, Camilla (born 1947) and Annabel (born 1949), and a son, Mark (1951–2014).

On 25 April 1947, Shand was retired from the army on account of disability and was granted the honorary rank of major. Shand had a country house, The Laines in Plumpton, East Sussex, and a town house in South Kensington, but in later life moved to Dorset.

He had various business interests, most notably as a partner in Block, Grey, and Block, a firm of wine merchants in South Audley Street, Mayfair, and later joined Ellis, Son and Vidler of Hastings and London. Shand was a reviewer of military books for Country Life magazine. In 1990, he wrote a war memoir entitled Previous Engagements and was the editor of the memoirs of a fellow army officer, Tim Bishop, titled One Young Soldier: The Memoirs of a Cavalryman, which was published in 1993. Shand compiled Bishop's diaries into a book after his death in 1986.

Shand was a Deputy Lieutenant of Sussex and was Vice-Lord-Lieutenant of East Sussex from 1974 until 1992. He remained passionate about fox hunting and was Master of Southdown Fox Hounds from 1956 to 1975. He was Exon and later Adjutant and Clerk of the Cheque of the Queen's Body Guard of the Yeomen of the Guard. Shand supported the Conservative Party in the UK.

In 1993, Shand reportedly reproached Charles, Prince of Wales at a private event for ruining his daughter's life after their relationship became public. After a period of a strained relationship, both men eventually grew to like each other.

His wife, Rosalind, died on 14 July 1994, aged 72, having long suffered from osteoporosis.

Shand, who had a history of cancer, died of natural causes on 11 June 2006 at his home in Stourpaine, Dorset, aged 89, surrounded by his family.

On 16 June, Shand's funeral service was held at the Trinity Church in Stourpaine and was attended by the then Prince of Wales and Duchess of Cornwall. After the service, his body was cremated.

== Honours ==
Ribbon Bar of Major Bruce Shand

Country	Date	Appointment	Ribbon	Post-nominal letters	Notes
United Kingdom	5 July 1940	Military Cross		MC	Promoted to MC & Bar in 1942
United Kingdom	January 1942	Military Cross with Bar		MC & Bar	
United Kingdom		1939–1945 Star			
United Kingdom		Africa Star			
United Kingdom		France and Germany Star			
United Kingdom		War Medal 1939–1945			
United Kingdom	2 June 1953	Queen Elizabeth II Coronation Medal			
United Kingdom	6 February 1977	Queen Elizabeth II Silver Jubilee Medal			

== Memoirs ==
- Author. (1990). Previous Engagements. Michael Russell Publishing Ltd ISBN 978-0859551694
- Editor. (1993). One Young Soldier: The Memoirs of a Cavalryman. Michael Russell Publishing Ltd ISBN 978-0859551939

== Arms ==
Coat of arms of Bruce Shand
Notes A coat of arms was granted to Bruce Middleton Hope Shand by the Court of the Lord Lyon. Adopted 1980 Crest A boar statant Azure armed and langued Gules his dexter forefoot resting on a mullet Gules Escutcheon Azure a Boar's Head erased behind the ears Argent armed and langued Or on a Chief engrailed Argent between two Mullets Gules a Cross crosslet fitchy Sable Symbolism The arms contain symbolism from those of the Shands of Craig from Aberdeenshire. The boar's head might indicate a connection to the prominent Gordon family of Aberdeenshire, whose arms also contain a boar's head. The mullets (stars) probably stem from marriage alliances with families that used mullets in their arms: potentially the Aberdeenshire family of Blackhall or the family of Reid of Pitfoddells. The cross is used to difference the family arms and is specific to Major Shand.
