= Philip Morton Shand =

English architecture and culture critic

- Born: 21 January 1888; Kensington, London, England
- Died: 30 April 1960 (aged 72); Lyon, France
- Occupations: Journalist; architecture critic; wine and food writer; entrepreneur; pomologist
- Spouses: Edith Marguerite Harrington (m. 1916; div. 1920); Agatha Alys Fabre-Tonnerre (m. 1920; div. 1926); Georgette Thérèse Edmée Avril (m. 1926; div. 1931); Sybil Mary Sissons (m. 1931)
- Children: Bruce Shand; Sylvia Bunn; Elspeth Howe
- Parents: Alexander Faulkner Shand; Augusta Mary Coates
- Relatives: Camilla, Queen of the United Kingdom (granddaughter)

Philip Morton Shand (21 January 1888 – 30 April 1960), known as P. Morton Shand, was an English journalist, architecture critic (an early proponent of modernism), wine and food writer and businessman. He was the paternal grandfather of Queen Camilla.

== Early life ==
Shand was the son of the writer and barrister Alexander Faulkner Shand and his wife Augusta Mary Coates, was born in Kensington, London. He was educated at Eton College and King's College, Cambridge, as well as studying at the Sorbonne, Paris, and in Heidelberg, Germany.

Shand studied history at King's College, Cambridge, gaining his MA in 1914. Shand served in the First World War with the Royal Fusiliers regiment, and immediately afterwards, due to his fluent French and German, he was appointed as superintendent of all German prisoners' camps in France.

Already in 1914, he had translated from German to English Arthur Schnitzler's play Liebelei, under the title Playing with Love. Though his first major publications from that time were on food and wine, he began to also build a reputation as an architecture critic, working in particular for Architectural Review, where he had been influential in steering the journal's then proprietor and sometimes editor Hubert de Cronin Hastings in favour of modernism.

== Career ==
While living in Lyon, France, in the early 1920s, he was invited by the editor of the Architectural Association Journal to review the Exposition Internationale des Arts Décoratifs in Paris of 1925. In reviewing the exposition, he coined the term "Swedish grace" to describe the Scandinavian design of the time, evident in the work of among others Gunnar Asplund, though by that time a new, modernist architecture and design was emerging, as evident at the exposition in the work of its prime mover Le Corbusier.

Shand's first book on architecture, Modern Theatres and Cinemas was published in 1930 and featured many of those buildings he had encountered in Germany during the late 1920s, arguing that there the cinema had emerged as a separate design typology, not an adaptation of traditional theatre design.

The entire August 1930 issue of The Architectural Review was devoted to the topic of Swedish design, for which Shand delivered a 29-page illustrated survey of the Stockholm Exhibition. His positive response to the exhibition concentrated more on the overall effect of lightness, fragility, and uniformity. The exhibition had set out its mission of, in Shand's words, “taming and humanizing the growing monster” of Franco-German design.

Shand was befriended by some of the leading figures in European modernist architecture, including the German architect Peter Behrens, the Swiss-French Le Corbusier, the founder of the Bauhaus school German architect Walter Gropius, Finnish architect Alvar Aalto and Swiss historian-critic Sigfried Giedion, keeping correspondence with each of them. He also developed close links with architects back in the UK, encouraging their participation in the modernist debate. Shand translated from German to English Gropius's 1925 book Die neue Architektur und das Bauhaus, published in 1930 as The New Architecture and the Bauhaus. Shand with furniture designer and entrepreneur Jack Pritchard helped with Gropius's emigration from Germany to the UK in 1934.

Le Corbusier and Giedion had been prime movers in the foundation of the Congrès International d'Architecture Moderne (CIAM) in 1928, in the promotion of the cause of modernist architecture and town planning. Giedion was its first and only general secretary. There had been no British participants in the first CIAM conference in 1928. But, in January 1929, Shand wrote to Gropius suggesting Howard Robinson, head of the Architectural Association school of architecture and Shand's own cousin, as the British CIAM representative. When this did not work out, Shand recommended Japan-born, Canada-educated architect Wells Coates. Shand, together with architects Coates, Maxwell Fry and F. R. S. Yorke were the founding members of the MARS Group (Modern Architectural Research Group), which operated from 1933 to 1937. The group came into existence at the prompting of Giedion, after Shand wrote to him. Shand, Coates, Yorke and three other members of the Mars Group attended their first CIAM congress in 1933, which took place on board an ocean-going liner journeying from Marseilles to Athens in July that year.

A series of articles under the title Scenario for a Human Drama, in Architectural Review of 1934–5, was Shand's attempt to document and place the contemporary architecture in Europe. In seven parts it set out ideas on the evolution of Continental modernism.

Shand was sued for bankruptcy in March 1933, with the court case taking place in August that year. That same year, however, with Geoffrey Boumphrey (a fellow member of the Design and Industries Association), he founded a company Finmar to import Aalto's furniture into the UK, for the purposes of which he set up an exhibition of Aalto's furniture and experimental wood reliefs at the Fortnum & Mason department store in London. In 1935 he visited Finland with Jack Pritchard and Graham Reid and saw Aalto's Paimio Sanatorium and the Artek furniture factory which made the furniture sold in the UK by Finmar. Shand retained a friendship with Aalto, and as Aalto spoke little English until the 1940s, they conversed and corresponded in German. Aalto would later tell his biographer, Göran Schildt, that due to his military background and faultless German, Shand had acted as a British spy behind German lines during the war, though Shand himself never made such a claim elsewhere. On Aalto being awarded the Royal Institute of British Architects Gold Medal in 1957, Shand wrote him to offer his congratulations, and Aalto wrote back saying of himself and Shand that "We are the last surviving soldiers of the Salvation Army". On his trip to the UK, Aalto visited Shand in Cambridge, where he spent his retirement.

Despite his early enthusiasm for modernism in design and architecture, by the late 1950s he was far more critical towards the results of modern architecture, writing that:

I have frightful nightmares, and no wonder for I am haunted by a gnawing sense of guilt in having, in however minor and obscure degree, helped to bring about, anyhow encouraged and praised, the embryo searchings that have now materialized into a monster neither of us [Shand or Betjeman] could have foreseen: Contemporary architecture (= the piling up of gigantic children's toy bricks in utterly dehumanized and meaningless forms), 'Art' and all that. It is no longer funny; it is frightening, all-invading menace.

— P. Morton Shand (1958),

Shand demonstrated his knowledge of food and wine in articles and books published during the 1920s. He set out his viewpoint at the beginning of the 300-page A Book of Food (1927): "This is frankly a book of prejudices, for all food is a question of likes and dislikes. One may be tolerant about religion, politics, and a hundred and one other things, but not about the food that one eats."

== Death ==
Shand died on 30 April 1960 (age 72) in Lyon, France. The poet John Betjeman and the French wine expert André Simon wrote addenda to Shand's obituary in The Times.

== Family life ==
Shand was married four times. His first marriage was to Edith Marguerite Harrington in April 1916, with whom he had his only son, Bruce, father to Queen Camilla. They divorced in 1920.

Shand's second marriage was to Agatha Alys Fabre-Tonnerre, in 1920, with whom he had a daughter named Sylvia Doris Rosemary. They divorced in 1926.

Shand's third marriage was to Georgette Thérèse Edmée Avril, whom he married in 1926. They divorced in 1931, without having had any children.

Shand's fourth marriage was to Sybil Mary Sissons (previously Mrs. Slee) in 1931, with whom he had one daughter named Elspeth. Elspeth married Geoffrey Howe, later Baron Howe of Aberavon, who was then a lawyer and later a politician. Elspeth became a life peer in her own right as Baroness Howe of Idlicote. Shand's step-daughter, Mary (Sybil's daughter from her first husband naval Commander John Ambrose Slee) married architect Sir James Stirling.

== Works ==
- A Book of French Wines, 1925.
- A Book of Food, 1927.
- A Book of Other Wines – Than French, 1929.
- Bacchus or Wine To-Day and To-Morrow, 1929. In the series To-day and To-morrow.
- Modern Theatres and Cinemas, 1930.
- Building: The Evolution of an Industry, 1954.

== Translations ==
- Arthur Schnitzler, Playing with Love
- Walter Gropius, The New Architecture and the Bauhaus
