= Thomas Coram Foundation for Children =

Children's charity in England

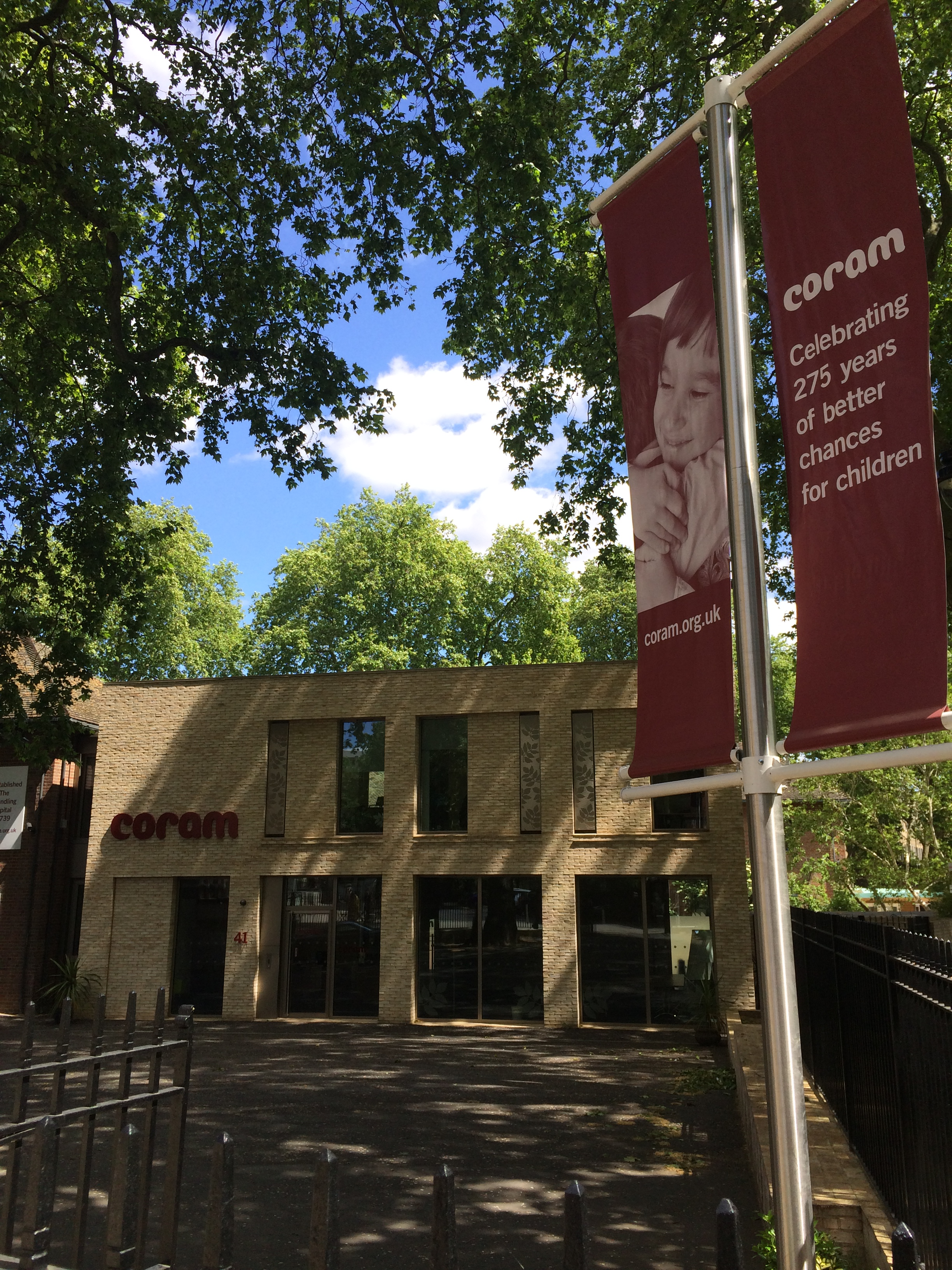
The entrance to the Coram Campus

The Thomas Coram Foundation for Children is a large children's charity in London operating under the name Coram. It was founded by eighteenth-century philanthropist Captain Thomas Coram who campaigned to establish a charity that would care for the high numbers of abandoned babies in London, setting up the Foundling Hospital in 1739 at Lamb's Conduit Fields in Bloomsbury. By the 1950s social change had led to the closure of the hospital and the charity adopted the broader name Thomas Coram Foundation for Children in 1954.

The charity acts as an adoption agency in addition to a wide range of educational and advisory services for children. It retains part of its original site in London but moved its heritage collections into the care of The Foundling Museum in 1998.

== History ==
The Foundling Hospital was established by the philanthropic sea captain Thomas Coram, who was appalled to see abandoned babies and children starving and dying in the streets of London. In 1742–1745 a building was erected north of Lamb's Conduit Street in Bloomsbury. Boys were housed in the West Wing of the new home. The East Wing was built in 1752 to house girls.

The artist William Hogarth was a governor of the Foundling Hospital and donated some of his work to the foundation as well as designing its coat of arms. The art collection also contains works by Thomas Gainsborough and Sir Joshua Reynolds, including a full-length portrait of Thomas Coram, along with musical scores by Handel including one of three fair copies of Messiah.

In 1926, the governors of the hospital decided to relocate it out of the city, initially to Redhill, Surrey, and then to Berkhamsted in 1935. It then closed as a children's home in the 1950s, the buildings becoming Ashlyns School, a local authority school not related to the charity.

The Foundling Hospital was renamed the Thomas Coram Foundation for Children in 1954.

== Activities and services ==
Coram's headquarters are at Brunswick Square in London. It operates as a registered voluntary adoption agency and fostering service and in July 2024, Ofsted rated it as "outstanding".

=== Adoption and care ===
Coram Adoption is an independent adoption service working in London and the surrounding areas. They also work in partnership with local authorities. Their partnership with the London Borough of Harrow was the first use of the model. Coram were also one of the pioneers of 'concurrent planning' (also known as 'foster to adopt'), and received government funding to become a 'National Centre of Excellence in Early Years Permanence' in 2012.

In 2015 the British Association for Adoption and Fostering went into administration. Coram took over many of the services in England, offering a total of £40,000 and taking on 50 of the 135 employees. The membership, training and research organisation became CoramBAAF. The Independent Review Mechanism (England) was taken over by Coram Children's Legal Centre. The National Adoption Register for England is now run by First4Adoption (jointly run by Coram and Adoption UK).

Coram-i, a company part of the Coram group, helps local authorities improve children’s services by offering consultancy in areas like adoption, fostering, and special guardianship. In 2021, Coram-i launched The Coram Innovation Incubator (CII) in collaboration with ten local authorities – along with EY, Microsoft and PA Consulting – a specialist vehicle for children’s services providers to generate, test and scale innovative solutions to shared challenges facing the children’s social care sector.

Coram IAC (Intercountry Adoption Centre) is the UK's only dedicated international adoption charity and joined Coram in 2023. Since 1997, the organisation has been supporting prospective adopters through preparation, assessment, and the process of being matched with a child from abroad.

=== Education ===
Coram SCARF (previously known as Coram Life Education) runs PSHE lessons in schools across England and in Aberdeenshire to educate children about health, wellbeing, and drugs. It was formed in 2009 as an amalgamation between Coram and Life Education.

Coram Beanstalk equips adults and young people to ‘do reading’ better with children through volunteer reading helpers, school and peer mentoring programmes and community groups.

Coram Shakespeare Schools Foundation (CSSF) works with schools across the UK to give young people the opportunity to build their confidence, skills and knowledge by learning about and performing Shakespeare.

Coram's primary education programme makes use of Healthy Harold, a giraffe puppet initially created for Life Education Australia.

=== Legal advice and advocacy ===
In 2011, the Children's Legal Centre and Coram were amalgamated into Coram Children's Legal Centre (CCLC). CCLC’s support covers education, discrimination, immigration, asylum, community care and family law. Coram International is part of CCLC, working with governments, UN bodies, IGOs and NGOs worldwide to protect and promote children and young people’s human rights.

In 2013, the charity Voice merged with Coram to form Coram Voice. Coram Voice is a children’s rights organisation, championing the rights of children in care, care leavers and others who depend upon the help of the state.

=== Research and evaluation ===
The Coram Institute is a think tank dedicated to the future of children, working with partners and young people to learn from the past, examine current needs and create better chances for the next generation. The Institute informs and influences policy and practice, and collaborates with relevant partners to deliver solutions to the challenges children and young people face today.

A key area of the Institute, the Coram Impact and Evaluation team conducts research involving children, young people, parents, and professionals to identify and promote best practices that improve outcomes for children.

=== Early years, family and childcare ===
Coram Family and Childcare (CFC) publishes the annual childcare survey, the reference for understanding cost and availability of childcare across Great Britain. It also delivers parent-led programmes nationwide.

In 2023, Hempsall’s joined Coram as Coram Hempsall’s. Operating since 1999, the organisation supports practitioners, providers, local authorities, and governments in delivering sustainable early years and childcare services.

On 2 May 2025 the Professional Association for Childcare and Early Years (PACEY) joined the Coram Group as Coram PACEY.

== Foundling Museum ==
The historic collections of the Foundling Hospital were moved in the 1920s to Brunswick Square, London, where a museum was established. In 1998 the building and collections were formally constituted as a separate charity, the Foundling Museum.

== See also ==
- List of organisations with a British royal charter
