= Quintessentially Group =

British concierge company founded in 2000

- Type: Privately held company
- Industry: Lifestyle management
- Founded: 2000
- Founders: Aaron Simpson; Ben Elliot; Paul Drummond
- Headquarters: London, England, United Kingdom
- Number of locations: 40+
- Key people: Darren Ellis, Group CEO
- Services: Concierge and Lifestyle Management services
- Revenue: US$ 23,100,000 (2018)
- Number of employees: 1,000 (2019)
- Website: quintessentially.com

Quintessentially Group is a British lifestyle management company founded in 2000 by Aaron Simpson, Ben Elliot and Paul Drummond. The company is headquartered in London and operates 60 offices worldwide. Quintessentially is a members-only "luxury lifestyle management service" that provides concierge services including travel bookings, restaurant recommendations, and access to events.

== History ==
Quintessentially was established in 2000 by Aaron Simpson, Paul Drummond and Ben Elliot. Simpson met Drummond at Oxford University and later started the company with business partner Elliot as a small, London-based concierge service. Before founding Quintessentially, Elliot had co-founded K-Bar Plc, a group of nightclubs and bars, and Simpson had worked as a film producer.

From 2002 to 2005, Quintessentially expanded from two offices in the United Kingdom to ten around the world. In 2018 the company reports to over 60+ offices in cities such as Cairo, Dubai, Hong Kong, London, Los Angeles and New York. In 2010, the company was estimated to have about 86,000 subscribers, including 800 billionaires. Quintessentially moved its headquarters from Soho to Portland Place in early 2011. In 2017, it was announced that the company was building a "super yacht" for its members.

In 2015 Quintessentially created the website for an international escort agency called Le Besoin which was registered at its London headquarters. When revealed by the Financial Times in 2020, they denied any further involvement in the agency, stating they had “created a website for a client launching a dating service”.

Since 2019, Ben Elliot has been the Co-Chairman of the Conservative Party, with responsibility for fundraising. An accountant’s report described the group's structure as 'opaque and complex'. In January 2021 some of Quintessentially UK Limited's 14 sister companies were up to a year late in filing their accounts. In 2021 professional services firm Deloitte was sought with finding a buyer for Quintessentially.

The company has boasted about how it serves wealthy Russian clients, which includes opening an office in Russia and creating a "dedicated Russian team." After Russia invaded Ukraine in 2022, the company deleted its webpage that boasted about serving Russian elite clients.

== Operations ==
Quintessentially Group is a network of 16 brand services that operate the personal services provided for its private members. These companies include Travel, Events and Estates, and Quintessentially Gifts.

Quintessentially UK Ltd — the holding company for a network of more than 30 businesses, including an art dealership, a florist, an estate agency and a chauffeur service, that cater to wealthy clients — recorded a £3.1m loss in the year to April 30, 2018, its latest available accounts. In 2019, published accounts showed revenues of £50 million and losses of £4.4 million.

=== Quintessentially Lifestyle ===
Quintessentially Lifestyle is a members-only luxury lifestyle management and concierge service. The New York Times described Quintessentially Lifestyle, "The company that transformed the idea of concierge services into 'lifestyle management.'" It offers corporate and private memberships that include discounted rates on hotels and other reservations, access to events, luxury gifts, and other services.

Globally, the firm employs more than 1500 Lifestyle Managers in over 60 offices speaking 35 languages.

Since 2016, the Department for International Trade has paid Quintessentially £1.4 million to introduce Whitehall officials to high-net worth individuals, so they can "network at the highest levels", according to a contract seen by the FT.

=== Quintessentially Foundation ===
Established in June 2008, the Quintessentially Foundation is the charitable arm of the Group. It has raised more than £9,000,000 through various fundraisers, including the annual Poker Night.
