= Pratima Barua Pandey =

Indian singer

Pratima Baruah Pandey প্ৰতিমা বৰুৱা পাণ্ডে
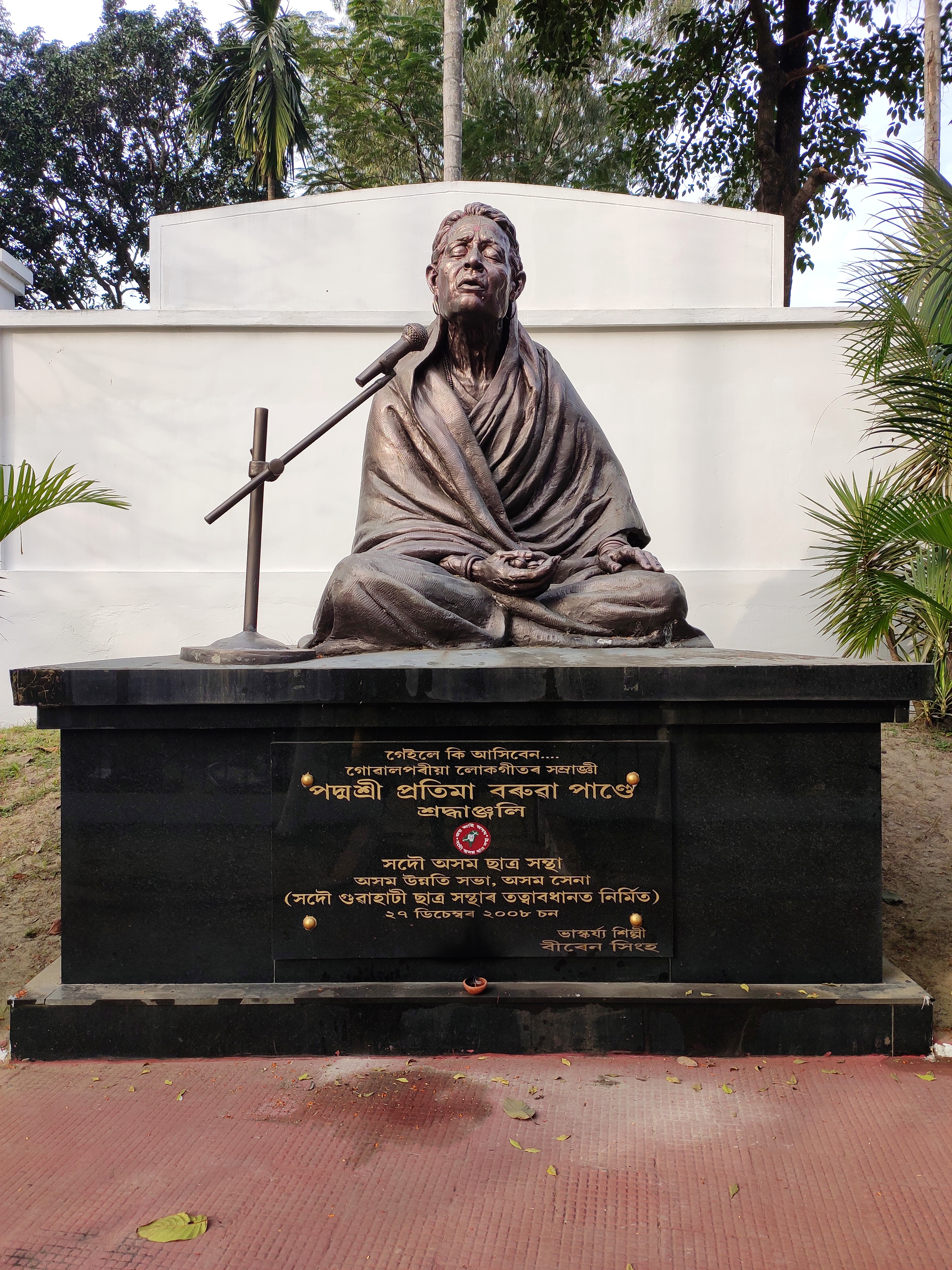
- Statue of Pandey at Chanmari, Guwahati

Background information
- Born: 3 October 1934; Calcutta, Bengal Presidency, British Raj
- Died: 27 December 2002 (aged 68) Guwahati, Assam, India
- Genres: Goalpariya Lokogeet; Indian folk
- Occupations: Singer; songwriter
- Instrument: Vocals

Pratima Barua Pandey (Note: Assamese: প্ৰতিমা বৰুৱা পাণ্ডে, Assamese pronunciation: [pɹɔtima bɔɹua pandɛ].) (Assamese: প্ৰতিমা বৰুৱা পাণ্ডে, pronounced [pɹɔtima bɔɹua pandɛ]; 3 October 1934 – 27 December 2002) was an Indian folk singer from the royal family of Gauripur in Western Assam's Dhubri district. Barua Pandey, a national awardee, best known for her Goalpariya (Koch Rajbongshi / Kamatapuri / Deshi) songs Hastir Kanya and Mur Mahut Bandhure, was the daughter of Prakritish Chandra Barua (Lalji) and niece of filmmaker Pramathesh Barua of Devdas fame.

== Early life ==
Barua Pandey was born on 3 October 1934, in Calcutta. She pursued her early education in the city's Gokhale Memorial School, after which she came to Assam to study at the Girls’ High School, Gauripur, home of the royal family. She mostly spent her early years in between the din of Calcutta and the soothing environments of riverside "Gadadhar" at hometown Gauripur. Although she learned Rabindrasangeet at school, but she never took any formal training or teaching in music except the encouraging words from her father Prakritesh Chandra Barua (Lalji). The most crucial point in her life came when Dr. Bhupen Hazarika visited Gauripur in 1955 and attended a jalsa organised on a social occasion, the shy young Pratima, though tongue-tied with fear, let her voice and the lyrics of the lokageet in Goalpariya dialect flow in tune with the strings and rhythms of the dhol, junuka, dotora, darinda, dhuluki and Bashi which are musical instruments in Goalpariya culture. Dr. Hazarika was highly impressed and predicted that this voice would definitely take Goalpariya lokageet to great heights. Indeed, he first presented Goalpariya folk song in his film Era Bator Sur. Besides the mahout songs, Barua Pandey used to sing the evergreen hit We Are in the Same Boat, Brother in stage shows. She married Ganga Shanker Pandey, a retired principal of the Gauripur P. B. College. She was inspired from the old family traditions of elephant captiving in their family. The mahouts who catch the elephant use to sing a form of song which she refined and polished to give the form of Goalpariya lokageet. This can be found in her song "O Mor Mahut Bondhu re".

== Popular songs ==
- "Aaji Danrao Kala"
- "Afnla Kadamer Tale"
- "Bail Machhe Kheil Kare"
- "Dhick Dhick"
- "Dui Diner Bhalobasha"
- "Dung Nori Dung"
- "Ek Bar Hori Bolo Rasona"
- "Hastir Kanya"
- "Komola Sundori Nache"
- "Matir Manush"
- "Matir Pinjira"
- "O Birikha"
- "O Pare Kamrangar Gachh"
- "Oh Mor Mahut Bandhure"
- "Sonar Chand Chandre"
- "O Shyam Kaliya Re"

== Awards and recognition ==
Pratima Barua Pandey was awarded the Padma Shri and Sangeet Natak Akademi for her pioneering efforts in popularising Goalpariya lokageet.

A documentary film made on her life and works by noted filmmaker Prabin Hazarika, Hastir Kanya, won National Film Award for Best Biographical Film in 1997, earned great appreciation and created waves at the South Asian film festival in 1998. Filmmaker Bobby Sarma Baruah started filming a full-length feature film based on Barua Pandey's life in late 2015, titled Sonar Baran Pakhi. Co-produced by ASFFDC and BB Entertainment, the film was released in December 2016.
