= Mark Shand =

English travel writer and conservationist (1951–2014)

- Born: Mark Roland Shand; 28 June 1951; London, England
- Died: 23 April 2014 (aged 62); New York City, U.S.
- Education: St. Ronan's School, Kent; Milton Abbey School, Dorset
- Occupations: Travel writer; Conservationist
- Spouse: Clio Goldsmith (m. 1990; div. 2009)
- Children: 1
- Parents: Bruce Shand; Rosalind Cubitt
- Relatives: Queen Camilla (sister); Annabel Elliot (sister); King Charles III (brother-in-law)

Mark Roland Shand (28 June 1951 – 23 April 2014) was an English travel writer and conservationist. He was the brother of Queen Camilla. Shand wrote four travel books, and as a BBC conservationist appeared in documentaries related to his journeys, most of which centred on the survival of elephants. His book Travels on My Elephant became a bestseller and won the Travel Writer of the Year Award at the British Book Awards in 1992. He was the chairman of Elephant Family, a wildlife foundation, which he co-founded in 2002.

== Family, education and marriage ==
Mark Roland Shand was born on 28 June 1951, the third child and only son of Major Bruce Shand (1917–2006) and his wife, Rosalind Cubitt (1921–1994), daughter of the 3rd Baron Ashcombe and Sonia Rosemary Keppel, daughter of Alice Keppel. He was the brother of Queen Camilla (formerly Camilla Parker-Bowles) and Annabel Elliot.

Shand was educated first at St Ronan's School in Kent and then Milton Abbey School in Dorset. He was expelled from Milton Abbey for smoking cannabis, in response his father sent him to Australia to make a living on his own, where he had numerous jobs including working as a jackaroo on a station and a guard at an opal mine. He later returned to London and worked as a porter at Sotheby's. Subsequently, he and his friend Harry Fane, the son of the 15th Earl of Westmorland, started a business of selling Cartier jewellery for a while. He dated Caroline Kennedy, daughter of U.S. president John F. Kennedy and First Lady Jacqueline Kennedy Onassis, in the mid-1970s.

In 1990, Shand married Clio Goldsmith, a French former actress, daughter of Edward Goldsmith and niece of Sir James Goldsmith, who were all members of the prominent Goldsmith family. They lived in Rome and had a daughter, Ayesha (born 1st October 1994). Shand confirmed in 2010 that the couple were divorced. He was a godfather to one of the sons of Jemima Goldsmith, his former wife's cousin.

== Career ==
Shand published his first travel book Skulduggery in 1987, based on an expedition to Irian Jaya in Indonesia. He later became the author of Travels on My Elephant (1992), Queen of the Elephants (1996) and River Dog: A Journey Down the Brahmaputra (2003). Travels on My Elephant became a bestseller and won the Travel Writer of the Year Award at the British Book Awards in 1992.

He was featured in many documentaries for the BBC and the National Geographic Channel, some related to his writings. Elephants were featured in many of his writings and other pursuits. An unabashed Indophile, the majority of his writings and TV features were Indo-Nostalgic. He also had a deep interest in Hinduism and Indian culture.

As a BBC conservationist and travel writer, he wrote a book and the corresponding BBC documentary, Queen of the Elephants, based on the life of the first female mahout in recent times, Parbati Barua of Kaziranga. The book won the Prix Litteraire d'Amis award, providing publicity to the profession of mahouts, and to Kaziranga herself.

Shand was actively involved in the conservation of the Asian elephant and co-founded a charity called Elephant Family in 2002. His book Travels on My Elephant was about his adventure with "Tara" (his elephant) in India, who was the inspiration for the charity. Shand was also a patron of Anti-Slavery International, a member of the Royal Geographical Society and an honorary Chief Wildlife Warden of Assam.

In 2014, Mark Shand received "the Conservationist of the Year 2014" award, and the Fragile Rhino award of The Perfect World Foundation at the Conservation Gala Dinner "Save The Rhino" in Gothenburg, Sweden. Shand had been expected to attend as a guest of honour, but died unexpectedly before the event.

== Death ==
On 23 April 2014, Shand was taken to Bellevue Hospital in Manhattan, New York City, after sustaining a serious head injury caused by a fall outside the Rose Bar of the Gramercy Park Hotel after lighting a cigarette. Earlier in the evening he had attended a fund-raising auction at Sotheby's in aid of the Elephant Family. He died later that day, aged 62. His nephews Tom Parker Bowles and Ben Elliot flew to New York to escort his body back to the United Kingdom. A private funeral service was held for Shand at Holy Trinity Church in Stourpaine, Dorset, on 1 May, where his father's funeral service had been held.

== Legacy ==
To honour his memory as one of the greatest "wildlife" personalities of his generation, the Balipara Foundation Awards in Assam, India, created the Mahout Mark Shand Recognition for Elephant Management award in 2014, in short the Mark Shand Mahout Award, to be awarded to a person making an outstanding contribution towards the well-being of the Asiatic Elephant population. Also in 2014, his former school St Ronan's in Kent dedicated an all-weather pitch named the Shandy-Ba in his memory. Shand was known as a sporty pupil, and captained the cricket and rugby teams during his time at the school from 1959 to 1964.

After his death, The Elephant Family received overwhelming support; in response the charity launched The Mark Shand Memorial Fund, to raise funds to save the Asian elephant. King Charles III and Queen Camilla became joint royal presidents of the charity in 2014.

The Elephant family also built the Mark Shand Memorial Asian Elephant Learning Centre, a clinic for elephants at the Kaziranga Discovery Park in India, which was launched by life patron Sir Evelyn de Rothschild in November 2015.

== Arms ==
Coat of arms of Mark Shand
| Notes A coat of arms was granted to Bruce Middleton Hope Shand by the Court of the Lord Lyon. Adopted By father in 2005. Adopted by Mr. Mark Shand in 2006 upon his father's death. Crest A boar statant Azure armed and langued Gules his dexter forefoot resting on a mullet Gules Escutcheon Azure a Boar's Head erased behind the ears Argent armed and langued Or on a Chief engrailed Argent between two Mullets Gules a Cross crosslet fitchy Sable Symbolism The arms contain symbolism from those of the Shands of Craig from Aberdeenshire. The boar's head might indicate a connection to the prominent Gordon family of Aberdeenshire, whose arms also contain a boar's head. The mullets (stars) probably stem from marriage alliances with families that used mullets in their arms: potentially the Aberdeenshire family of Blackhall or the family of Reid of Pitfoddells. The cross is used to difference the family arms and is specific to Major Shand. |

== Travel books ==
- Skulduggery (1987). Jonathan Cape Ltd. ISBN 978-0224025010
- Travels on My Elephant (1992). Eland Books. ISBN 978-1906011697
- Queen of the Elephants. (1996). Vintage. ISBN 978-0099592013
- River Dog: A Journey Down the Brahmaputra. (2003). Little, Brown ISBN 978-0349115146
