= Elephant Family =

International non-governmental organization

- Type: Charity
- Industry: Wildlife conservation
- Founded: 2002
- Founders: Mark Shand, Caroline Casey, Dugal Muller, Robin Russell, Nicholas Claxton
- Headquarters: United Kingdom
- Key people: Mark Shand, Caroline Casey, Dugal Muller, Robin Russell, Nicholas Claxton
- Revenue: 2,007,473 pound sterling (2019)
- Number of employees: 9 (2019)
- Website: www.elephant-family.org

Elephant Family is an international NGO dedicated to protecting the Asian elephant from extinction in the wild. In the last fifty years, their population has roughly halved and 90% of their habitat has disappeared. Poaching, a growing skin trade, and demand for wild-caught calves for tourism remain a constant threat along with the deadly and escalating conflict between people and elephants for living space and food. Elephant Family funds pioneering projects across Asia to reconnect forest fragments, prevent conflict and fight wildlife crime. Since 2002, Elephant Family has funded over 170 conservation projects and raised over £10m through public art events for this iconic yet endangered animal.

The late Mark Shand was one of the founding forces behind the charity when it launched in 2002 under the patronage of the Rajmata of Jaipur and Sir Evelyn de Rothschild. Mark Shand was an adventurer, best-selling author and conservationist who dedicated his life to the survival of the Asian elephant. His mission started in 1988 when he rescued a street-begging elephant, which he named Tara, and journeyed 800 km across India with her. Tara became the star of Mark's best-selling book, Travels on my Elephant, which went on to win him Travel Writer of the Year.

King Charles III and his wife Queen Camilla are the charity's joint royal presidents and attended the launch of Elephant Parade India for the charity during their visit to Delhi in 2018.

Elephant Family is known for its award-winning creative events that have raised millions for Asian elephants including the Fabergé Big Egg Hunt in 2012 and 2014, Travels to my Elephant in 2015 and 2017, Elephant Parade London 2010 and India 2018, and the Animal Ball in 2013, 2016 and 2023.

== The Great Elephant Migration ==
A campaign "The Great Elephant Migration" is created by the Elephant Family USA. The Great Elephant Migration is a global travelling public art installation and conservation initiative launched in July 2024 in Newport, Rhode Island.

The project features 100 life-sized elephant sculptures handcrafted from Lantana camara, an invasive plant species, by Indigenous artisans from India's Nilgiri Biosphere Reserve in Tamil Nadu as part of The Real Elephant Collective.

== Leaders ==
- Mark Shand – chairman (2009–2014)
- Ruth Ganesh – principal trustee * co founder Elephant Family USA

== Partnership ==
Elephant Family partners with local NGOs across Asia to raise local awareness and support sustainable in-country conservation projects.

The NGOs include:

- Asian Elephant Specialist Group
- Cambodia Elephant Conservation Group
- Compass Films
- Danau Girang Field Centre
- Elephant Conservation Network
- Fauna & Flora International
- Grow Back for Posterity
- The Great Elephant Migration
- Hutan
- IFAW
- IUCNI
- Nature Conservation Foundation
- The DodoBase
- The Golden Triangle Asian Elephant Foundation
- Vesswic
- Veterinary Society for Sumatran Wildlife Conservation
- Wildlife Conservation Society
- Wildlife Protection Society of India
- Wildlife Trust of India
- World Land Trust
- Wildlife Society of Odisha

== Royal presidents ==
- King Charles III and Queen Camilla
