= List of hereditary peers removed under the House of Lords Act 1999 =

757 hereditary peers had their entitlement to sit in the House of Lords removed by the House of Lords Act 1999, based on the Orders of precedence in the United Kingdom.

== Excluded hereditary peers ==
Key
Conservative (327) Crossbench (232) Labour (19) Liberal Democrats (23) Non-affiliated (79) Did not take seat (77)
	Living peer as of 28 October 2026
	Acceded to the throne
	Qualifying title for Irish Peers
‡	Living peer who was subsequently returned to the House as of 28 October 2026
‡	Peer who subsequently returned to the House and has since died
§	Living peer who was subsequently elected to the House as of 28 October 2026
§	Peer who subsequently elected to the House and has since died

Hereditary peers excluded under the House of Lords Act 1999
#	Title	Name	Date succeeded (Note: Some of the Excluded members on the list succeeded to their respective peerages under the age of 21 which is the eligible age to become a member of the House of Lords to either be Introduced or to take their seats.)	Introduction or Sat first in the Lords	Qualifying title(s) (Note: Titles in the Peerage of Ireland did not grant the right to membership of the House of Lords. The listed Irish peers were able sit in the House due to also holding titles (listed in this column) in the Peerage of England, Great Britain or the United Kingdom.)	Aff.	Ref.
Royal family	The Duke of Edinburgh, KG, KT, OM, GBE, AC, QSO, CD, PC	Philip Mountbatten	20 Nov 1947 (Note: Created The Duke of Edinburgh on 20 November 1947.)	21 Jul 1948		XB.	
Royal family	The Prince of Wales, KG, KT, GCB, AK, QSO, CD, PC	Charles Mountbatten-Windsor (Note: Ascended to the throne on the 8 September 2022.) (Note: Held the office of Lord High Commissioner to the General Assembly of the Church of Scotland in 2000.)	26 Jul 1958 (Note: Created The Prince of Wales on 26 July 1958, became The Duke of Cornwall and Rothesay automatically on 6 February 1952.)	11 Feb 1970		XB.	
Royal family	The Duke of York, CVO	Andrew Mountbatten-Windsor (Note: Living (as of 28 October 2026) members of the Royal Family.) (Note: Held the office of Lord High Commissioner to the General Assembly of the Church of Scotland in 2007.)	23 Jul 1986 (Note: Created The Duke of York on 23 July 1986.)	11 Feb 1987		XB.	
Royal family	The Earl of Wessex, CVO	Edward Mountbatten-Windsor (Note: Held the office of Lord High Commissioner to the General Assembly of the Church of Scotland in 2014 and 2024.)	19 Jun 1999 (Note: Created The Earl of Wessex on 19 June 1999.)	Not Introduced		XB.	
Royal family	The Duke of Gloucester, KG, GCVO	Richard Windsor	10 Jun 1974	23 Oct 1974		XB.	
Royal family	The Duke of Kent, KG, GCMG, GCVO, CD	Edward Windsor	25 Aug 1942	9 Dec 1959		XB.	
Dukes in the Peerage of England	‡ The Duke of Somerset, DL, FRICS	John Seymour (Note: Returned to the House of Lords as a Elected Hereditary Peer.)	15 Nov 1984	22 Oct 1985		XB.	
Dukes in the Peerage of England	The Duke of Richmond, Lennox and Gordon	Charles Gordon-Lennox	2 Nov 1989	13 Jun 1990		XB.	
Dukes in the Peerage of England	The Duke of Grafton, KG, DL, FSA	Hugh FitzRoy	11 Nov 1970	4 Apr 1973		Con.	
Dukes in the Peerage of England	The Duke of Beaufort	David Somerset	5 Feb 1984	27 Mar 1995		Con.	
Dukes in the Peerage of England	The Duke of Saint Albans, FCA	Murray Beauclerk	8 Oct 1988	10 Nov 1988		Con.	
Dukes in the Peerage of England	The Duke of Bedford	Ian Russell	11 Oct 1953	4 Dec 1957		NA	
Dukes in the Peerage of England	The Duke of Devonshire, KG, MC, PC, DL	Andrew Cavendish (Note: Held a position of a Junior Minister in the Government of the United Kingdom before 1999.)	26 Nov 1950	23 Jan 1951		XB.	
Dukes in the Peerage of England	The Duke of Marlborough, JP, DL	John Spencer-Churchill	11 Mar 1972	20 Jul 1972		Con.	
Dukes in the Peerage of England	The Duke of Rutland	David Manners (Note: Peers living (as of 28 October 2026).)	4 Jan 1999	12 May 1999		Con.	
Dukes in the Peerage of Scotland	The Duke of Hamilton and Brandon	Angus Douglas-Hamilton	30 Mar 1973	24 Oct 1974	(Note: Scottish Hereditary Peers became automatic members of the House according to Section 4 of the Peerage Act 1963, even if this member is holding a qualifying title in the Peerage of England, the Peerage of Great Britain and the Peerage of the United Kingdom.)	XB.	
Dukes in the Peerage of Scotland	The Duke of Buccleuch and Queensberry, KT, VRD, JP	John Scott (Note: Former Member of Parliament in the House of Commons before succeeding to their respective peerages.)	4 Oct 1973	4 Dec 1973		Con.	
Dukes in the Peerage of Scotland	The Duke of Argyll, FRSA	Ian Campbell (Note: According to the Order of precedence in Scotland at the time of the passing of the Act, he was ranked as the Master of the Household.) (Note: Held the office of Lord Lieutenant of Argyll and Bute at the time of the passing of the Act until 2001.)	7 Apr 1973	26 Mar 1974		Con.	
Dukes in the Peerage of Scotland	The Duke of Atholl	John Murray	27 Feb 1996	––	(Note: Scottish Hereditary Peers became automatic members of the House according to Section 4 of the Peerage Act 1963, even if this member is not holding a qualifying title in the Peerage of England, the Peerage of Great Britain and the Peerage of the United Kingdom.)	None	
Dukes in the Peerage of Scotland	§ The Duke of Montrose	James Graham	10 Feb 1992	27 Jun 1995		Con.	
Dukes in the Peerage of Scotland	The Duke of Roxburghe	Guy Innes-Ker	26 Sep 1974	28 Jun 1977		Con.	
Dukes in the Peerage of Great Britain	The Duke of Manchester	Angus Montagu	3 Jun 1985	24 Jul 1986		XB.	
Dukes in the Peerage of Great Britain	The Duke of Northumberland, DL	Ralph Percy	31 Oct 1995	25 Jun 1996		Con.	
Dukes in the Peerage of Ireland	The Duke of Leinster	Gerald FitzGerald	8 Mar 1976	21 Oct 1976	V. Leinster	NA	
Dukes in the Peerage of Ireland	The Duke of Abercorn, KG	James Hamilton (Note: Held the office of Lord Steward of the Household in 2001–2009.) (Note: Held the office of Lord Lieutenant of Tyrone at the time of the passing of the Act until 2009.)	4 Jun 1979	25 Oct 1979	M. of Abercorn	Con.	
Dukes in the Peerage of the United Kingdom	The Duke of Wellington, KG, LVO, OBE, MC, DL	Valerian Wellesley	4 Jan 1972	20 Jul 1972		XB.	
Dukes in the Peerage of the United Kingdom	The Duke of Sutherland	John Egerton (Note: Sat in the House of Lords as The Earl of Ellesmere until 1 February 1963 when he inherited the Dukedom of Sutherland.)	1 Feb 1963 (Note: Succeeded to the Earldom of Ellesmere on 24 August 1944.)	6 Dec 1945		NA	
Dukes in the Peerage of the United Kingdom	The Duke of Westminster, OBE, TD, DL	Gerald Grosvenor	19 Feb 1979	9 May 1979		NA	
Dukes in the Peerage of the United Kingdom	The Duke of Fife	James Carnegie	26 Feb 1959	11 Nov 1959		NA	
Marquess in the Peerage of England	The Marquess of Winchester	Nigel Paulet	5 Mar 1968	10 Apr 1968		NA	
Marquesses in the Peerage of Scotland	The Marquess of Huntly	Granville Gordon	26 Jan 1987	13 Jan 1988		Con.	
Marquesses in the Peerage of Scotland	The Marquess of Queensberry	David Douglas	27 Apr 1954	12 May 1965		NA	
Marquesses in the Peerage of Scotland	The Marquess of Tweeddale	Edward Hay	23 Jan 1979	13 Mar 1979		XB.	
Marquesses in the Peerage of Scotland	The Marquess of Lothian, KCVO, DL, FRSA	Peter Kerr (Note: Held the office Lord-in-waiting (Government Whip) before 1999.)	12 Dec 1940	15 Aug 1945		Con.	
Marquesses in the Peerage of Great Britain	The Marquess of Lansdowne	Charles Petty-Fitzmaurice	25 Aug 1999	13 Oct 1999		Con.	
Marquesses in the Peerage of Great Britain	The Marquess Townshend, FRSA	George Townshend	17 Nov 1921	21 Oct 1937		Con.	
Marquesses in the Peerage of Great Britain	The Marquess of Salisbury, DL	Robert Gascoyne-Cecil	23 Feb 1972	27 Jun 1972		Con.	
Marquesses in the Peerage of Great Britain	The Marquess of Bath	Alexander Thynn	30 Jun 1992	13 Oct 1993		LD	
Marquesses in the Peerage of Great Britain	The Marquess of Abercorn		is the senior qualifying title for the Duke of Abercorn. (Note: Junior qualifying title, The Viscount Hamilton (GB 1776).)				
Marquesses in the Peerage of Great Britain	The Marquess of Hertford	Henry Seymour	22 Dec 1997	21 Apr 1999		XB.	
Marquesses in the Peerage of Great Britain	The Marquess of Bute	John Crichton-Stuart	21 Jul 1993	––		None	
Marquesses in the Peerage of Ireland	The Marquess of Waterford	John Beresford	25 Sep 1934	26 Jun 1956	L. Tyrone	Con.	
Marquesses in the Peerage of Ireland	The Marquess of Downshire	Robin Hill	28 Mar 1989	9 Nov 1989	E. of Hillsborough	Con.	
Marquesses in the Peerage of Ireland	The Marquess of Donegall, LVO	Dermot Chichester (Note: Sat in the House of Lords as The Lord Templemore until 24 May 1975 when he inherited the Marquessate of Donegall.)	24 May 1975 (Note: Succeeded to the Barony of Templemore on 2 October 1953.)	3 Dec 1953	L. Fisherwick	Con.	
Marquesses in the Peerage of Ireland	The Marquess of Donegall, LVO	Dermot Chichester	24 May 1975	16 Feb 1977	L. Fisherwick	Con.	
Marquesses in the Peerage of Ireland	The Marquess of Headfort, FRICS	Michael Taylour	24 Oct 1960	29 Nov 1960	L. Kenlis	XB.	
Marquesses in the Peerage of Ireland	The Marquess of Sligo	Jeremy Browne	11 Sep 1991	––	L. Monteagle	None	
Marquesses in the Peerage of Ireland	The Marquess of Ely	Charles Tottenham	31 May 1969	6 Jul 1972	L. Loftus	NA	
Marquesses in the Peerage of Ireland	The Marquess Conyngham	Frederick Conyngham	1 Apr 1974	––	L. Minster	None	
Marquesses in the Peerage of Ireland	The Marquess of Londonderry	Alistair Vane-Tempest-Stewart	17 Oct 1955	––	E. Vane	None	
Marquesses in the Peerage of the United Kingdom	The Marquess of Exeter	Michael Cecil	12 Jan 1988	26 Apr 1989		XB.	
Marquesses in the Peerage of the United Kingdom	The Marquess of Northampton	Spencer Compton	30 Jan 1978	16 Nov 1978		Con.	
Marquesses in the Peerage of the United Kingdom	The Marquess Camden	David Pratt	22 Mar 1983	17 Mar 1986		Con.	
Marquesses in the Peerage of the United Kingdom	The Marquess of Anglesey, FRSA, FRHistS, FSA	Henry Paget	21 Feb 1947	11 Jun 1947		XB.	
Marquesses in the Peerage of the United Kingdom	The Marquess of Ailesbury	Michael Brudenell-Bruce	15 Jul 1974	19 Jun 1975		XB.	
Marquesses in the Peerage of the United Kingdom	The Marquess of Bristol	Frederick Hervey	10 Jan 1999	–– (Note: A minor at the time of the passing of the Act, ineligible to receive a Writ of Summons.)		None	
Marquesses in the Peerage of the United Kingdom	The Marquess of Ailsa	Archibald Kennedy	7 Apr 1994	16 Jun 1994		Con.	
Marquesses in the Peerage of the United Kingdom	The Marquess of Normanby	Constantine Phipps	30 Jan 1994	6 Jul 1994		XB.	
Marquesses in the Peerage of the United Kingdom	The Marquess of Abergavenny, KG, OBE	John Nevill	30 Mar 1954	4 Nov 1954		XB.	
Marquesses in the Peerage of the United Kingdom	The Marquess of Zetland, DL	Mark Dundas	5 Oct 1989	13 Feb 1990		Con.	
Marquesses in the Peerage of the United Kingdom	The Marquess of Linlithgow	Adrian Hope	7 Apr 1987	11 Jun 1991		NA	
Marquesses in the Peerage of the United Kingdom	The Marquess of Aberdeen and Temair	Alastair Gordon	7 Sep 1984	7 May 1985		XB.	
Marquesses in the Peerage of the United Kingdom	The Marquess of Milford Haven	George Mountbatten	14 Apr 1970	4 Apr 1985		NA	
Marquesses in the Peerage of the United Kingdom	The Marquess of Reading	Simon Isaacs	2 Jul 1980	25 Feb 1981		Con.	
Earls in the Peerage of England	§ The Earl of Shrewsbury, Talbot and Waterford, DL	Charles Chetwynd-Talbot	12 Nov 1980	1 Jul 1981		Con.	
Earls in the Peerage of England	The Earl of Derby, DL	Edward Stanley	28 Nov 1994	22 May 1995		XB.	
Earls in the Peerage of England	The Earl of Huntingdon, LVO	William Hastings-Bass	24 Aug 1990	5 Nov 1992		XB.	
Earls in the Peerage of England	The Earl of Pembroke and Montgomery	Henry Herbert	16 Mar 1969	14 Feb 1978		Con.	
Earls in the Peerage of England	The Earl of Devon, DL	Hugh Courtenay	19 Nov 1998	25 Mar 1999		XB.	
Earls in the Peerage of England	The Earl of Lincoln	Edward Fiennes-Clinton	25 Dec 1988	––		None	
Earls in the Peerage of England	The Earl of Suffolk and Berkshire	Michael Howard	12 May 1941	27 Mar 1957		Con.	
Earls in the Peerage of England	The Earl of Denbigh and Desmond	Alexander Feilding	23 Mar 1995	20 Nov 1996		Con.	
Earls in the Peerage of England	The Earl of Westmorland, FRGS	Anthony Fane	8 Sep 1993	28 Jun 1994		XB.	
Earls in the Peerage of England	The Earl of Lindsey and Abingdon	Richard Bertie	11 Sep 1963	18 Jun 1964		Con.	
Earls in the Peerage of England	The Earl of Winchilsea and Nottingham	Daniel Finch-Hatton	27 Jun 1999	13 Oct 1999		LD	
Earls in the Peerage of England	§ The Earl of Sandwich	John Montagu (Note: Resigned from the House of Lords under the House of Lords Reform Act 2014 on 20 May 2024.)	25 Feb 1995	10 May 1995		XB.	
Earls in the Peerage of England	The Earl of Essex	Robert Capell	18 May 1981	7 Jun 1989		XB.	
Earls in the Peerage of England	The Earl of Carlisle	George Howard	28 Nov 1994	2 Jul 1996		LD	
Earls in the Peerage of England	The Earl of Shaftesbury	Anthony Ashley-Cooper	25 Mar 1961	28 Feb 1962		Con.	
Earls in the Peerage of England	The Earl of Portland	Timothy Bentinck	30 Jan 1997	20 Mar 1997		XB.	
Earls in the Peerage of England	The Earl of Scarbrough	Richard Lumley (Note: Held the office of Lord Lieutenant of South Yorkshire at the time of the passing of the Act until 2003.)	29 Jun 1969	4 Nov 1969		NA	
Earls in the Peerage of England	The Earl of Albemarle	Rufus Keppel	14 Jul 1979	12 Jan 1988		XB.	
Earls in the Peerage of England	The Earl of Coventry	George William Coventry	27 May 1940	21 Mar 1956		Con.	
Earls in the Peerage of England	The Earl of Jersey	William Child Villiers	9 Aug 1998	24 Mar 1999		XB.	
Earls in the Peerage of Scotland	The Countess of Sutherland	Elizabeth Sutherland	1 Jan 1963	26 Mar 1968	(Note: Female Hereditary Peers became automatic members of the House according to Section 6 of the Peerage Act 1963.)	NA	
Earls in the Peerage of Scotland	‡ The Earl of Crawford and Balcarres, KT, PC, DL	Robert Lindsay (Note: Returned to the House of Lords as a holder of a Life Peerage.) (Note: Resigned from the House of Lords under the House of Lords Reform Act 2014 on 28 November 2019.)	13 Dec 1975 (Note: Created a Life Peer on 24 January 1975.)	5 Mar 1975 (Note: Sat in the House of Lords as a Life Peer, The Lord Balniel, until his retirement on 28 November 2019.)		Con.	
Earls in the Peerage of Scotland	‡ The Earl of Crawford and Balcarres, KT, PC, DL	Robert Lindsay	13 Dec 1975	27 Jun 1977		Con.	
Earls in the Peerage of Scotland	§ The Countess of Mar	Margaret of Mar (Note: Resigned from the House of Lords under the House of Lords Reform Act 2014 on 1 May 2020.)	21 Apr 1975	28 Oct 1975		XB.	
Earls in the Peerage of Scotland	§ The Earl of Erroll	Merlin Hay (Note: According to the Order of precedence in Scotland at the time of the passing of the Act, he was ranked as the Lord High Constable.)	16 May 1978	6 Jul 1978		XB.	
Earls in the Peerage of Scotland	§ The Earl of Caithness, PC, FRICS	Malcolm Sinclair	8 May 1965	21 Jan 1970		Con.	
Earls in the Peerage of Scotland	The Earl of Rothes	Ian Leslie	17 May 1975	16 Feb 1977		NA	
Earls in the Peerage of Scotland	The Earl of Morton	John Douglas (Note: Held the office of Lord Lieutenant of West Lothian at the time of the passing of the Act until 2002.)	13 Feb 1976	13 Jun 1995		XB.	
Earls in the Peerage of Scotland	The Earl of Buchan, JP	Malcolm Erskine	26 Jul 1984	14 Nov 1984		XB.	
Earls in the Peerage of Scotland	The Earl of Eglinton and Winton	Archibald Montgomerie	21 Apr 1966	23 May 1979		NA	
Earls in the Peerage of Scotland	The Earl of Moray, FRICS	Douglas Stuart	27 Mar 1974	8 May 1997		NA	
Earls in the Peerage of Scotland	‡ The Earl of Mar and Kellie, DL	James Erskine (Note: Resigned from the House of Lords under the House of Lords Reform Act 2014 on 30 June 2017.)	22 Dec 1993	23 Mar 1994		LD	
Earls in the Peerage of Scotland	§ The Earl of Home, CVO, CBE	David Douglas-Home	9 Oct 1995	28 Oct 1996		Con.	
Earls in the Peerage of Scotland	The Earl of Perth, PC	David Drummond	15 Dec 1951	9 Apr 1952 (Note: Elected as a Representative peer of Scotland before the Peerage Act 1963 and also as representative peer on 7 June 1955 and 20 October 1959.)		XB.	
Earls in the Peerage of Scotland	The Earl of Strathmore and Kinghorne, DL	Michael Bowes-Lyon (Note: Held the office Captain of the Yeomen of the Guard before 1999.)	19 Aug 1987	10 Nov 1988		Con.	
Earls in the Peerage of Scotland	The Earl of Haddington	John Baillie-Hamilton	17 Apr 1986	17 Mar 1987		Con.	
Earls in the Peerage of Scotland	The Earl of Galloway	Randolph Stewart	13 Jun 1978	16 May 1979		Con.	
Earls in the Peerage of Scotland	The Earl of Lauderdale	Patrick Maitland	27 Nov 1968	11 Dec 1968		Con.	
Earls in the Peerage of Scotland	§ The Earl of Lindsay	James Lindesay-Bethune	1 Oct 1989	22 Feb 1990		Con.	
Earls in the Peerage of Scotland	The Countess of Loudoun	Barbara Abney-Hastings	24 Feb 1960	22 Jun 1967		XB.	
Earls in the Peerage of Scotland	The Earl of Kinnoull, FRICS	William Hay	18 Mar 1938	3 Jul 1956		Con.	
Earls in the Peerage of Scotland	The Earl of Elgin and Kincardine, KT, CD, JP	Andrew Bruce (Note: Held the office of Lord High Commissioner to the General Assembly of the Church of Scotland in 1980–1981.)	27 Nov 1968	21 Jan 1969		Con.	
Earls in the Peerage of Scotland	The Earl of Wemyss and March, KT, JP	David Charteris (Note: According to the Order of precedence in Scotland at the time of the passing of the Act, he was ranked as the Lord Clerk Register.) (Note: Held the office of Lord High Commissioner to the General Assembly of the Church of Scotland in 1959–1960 and 1977.)	12 Jul 1937	3 Aug 1944		Con.	
Earls in the Peerage of Scotland	The Earl of Dalhousie	James Ramsay (Note: Held the office of Lord Steward of the Household in 2009–2023.)	15 Jul 1999	––		None	
Earls in the Peerage of Scotland	The Earl of Airlie, KT, GCVO, PC, JP	David Ogilvy (Note: Held the office of Lord Chamberlain of the Household in 1984–1997, HM's Permanent Lord-in-Waiting after appointment.) (Note: Held the office of Lord Lieutenant of Angus at the time of the passing of the Act until 2001.)	28 Dec 1968	27 Mar 1969		XB.	
Earls in the Peerage of Scotland	The Earl of Leven and Melville	Alexander Leslie-Melville	15 Jan 1947	––		None	
Earls in the Peerage of Scotland	The Countess of Dysart	Rosamund Greaves	2 Jun 1975	––		None	
Earls in the Peerage of Scotland	§ The Earl of Northesk	David Carnegie	26 Jan 1994	14 Jun 1994		Con.	
Earls in the Peerage of Scotland	§ The Earl of Dundee	Alexander Scrymgeour	29 Jun 1983	10 Nov 1983		Con.	
Earls in the Peerage of Scotland	The Earl of Annandale and Hartfell, DL	Patrick Hope-Johnstone	5 Apr 1983	6 Feb 1986		Con.	
Earls in the Peerage of Scotland	The Earl of Dundonald	Iain Cochrane	4 Oct 1986	22 May 1991		Con.	
Earls in the Peerage of Scotland	The Earl of Kintore	Michael Keith	1 Oct 1989	16 May 1990		XB.	
Earls in the Peerage of Scotland	The Earl of Dunmore	Malcolm Murray	28 Sep 1995	9 Nov 1998		XB.	
Earls in the Peerage of Scotland	The Earl of Orkney	Peter St. John	5 Feb 1998	––		None	
Earls in the Peerage of Scotland	The Earl of Seafield	Ian Ogilvie-Grant	30 Sep 1969	17 Feb 1977		Con.	
Earls in the Peerage of Scotland	‡ The Earl of Stair	John Dalrymple	26 Feb 1996	11 Feb 1998		XB.	
Earls in the Peerage of Scotland	The Earl of Rosebery and Midlothian, DL	Neil Primrose	31 May 1974	8 Nov 1977		NA	
Earls in the Peerage of Scotland	‡ The Earl of Glasgow, DL	Patrick Boyle	8 Jun 1984	24 Apr 1990		LD	
Earls in the Peerage of Great Britain	§ The Earl Ferrers, PC, DL	Robert Shirley (Note: Held the office of Deputy Leader of the House of Lords in 1979–1983 and 1988–1997.)	11 Oct 1954	2 Feb 1955		Con.	
Earls in the Peerage of Great Britain	The Earl of Dartmouth, FCA	William Legge	14 Dec 1997	16 Mar 1998		Con.	
Earls in the Peerage of Great Britain	The Earl of Tankerville	Peter Bennett	27 Apr 1980	––		None	
Earls in the Peerage of Great Britain	The Earl of Aylesford, JP	Charles Finch-Knightley	20 Mar 1958	19 Mar 1959		NA	
Earls in the Peerage of Great Britain	The Earl of Macclesfield	Richard Parker	7 Dec 1992	28 Apr 1993		XB.	
Earls in the Peerage of Great Britain	The Earl Waldegrave	James Waldegrave	23 May 1995	18 Jun 1996		Con.	
Earls in the Peerage of Great Britain	The Earl of Harrington	William Stanhope	16 Nov 1929	26 Nov 1985		NA	
Earls in the Peerage of Great Britain	The Earl of Portsmouth	Quentin Wallop	28 Sep 1984	8 Jul 1985		NA	
Earls in the Peerage of Great Britain	The Earl of Brooke and Warwick	Guy Greville	20 Jan 1996	24 Oct 1996		XB.	
Earls in the Peerage of Great Britain	The Earl of Buckinghamshire	George Hobart-Hampden	19 Apr 1983	8 May 1984		Con.	
Earls in the Peerage of Great Britain	The Earl of Guilford	Piers North	26 Mar 1999	20 Oct 1999		Con.	
Earls in the Peerage of Great Britain	The Earl of Hardwicke	Joseph Yorke	31 Dec 1974	19 Apr 1993		NA	
Earls in the Peerage of Great Britain	The Earl of Ilchester, FRSA	Maurice Fox-Strangways	4 Oct 1970	17 Mar 1976		XB.	
Earls in the Peerage of Great Britain	The Earl De La Warr	William Sackville	9 Feb 1988	29 Jul 1988		Con.	
Earls in the Peerage of Great Britain	The Earl of Radnor	Jacob Pleydell-Bouverie	23 Nov 1968	20 Feb 1969		Con.	
Earls in the Peerage of Great Britain	The Earl Spencer	Charles Spencer	29 Mar 1992	18 Nov 1992		XB.	
Earls in the Peerage of Great Britain	The Earl Bathurst, DL	Henry Bathurst	21 Sep 1943	1 Jun 1948		Con.	
Earls in the Peerage of Great Britain	The Earl of Hillsborough		is the senior qualifying title of the Marquess of Downshire. (Note: Junior qualifying title, The Lord Harwich (GB 1756).)				
Earls in the Peerage of Great Britain	The Earl of Clarendon	Laurence Villiers	13 Dec 1955	9 Jul 1956		NA	
Earls in the Peerage of Great Britain	The Earl of Mansfield and Mansfield, JP, DL	William Murray	2 Sep 1971	23 Nov 1971		Con.	
Earls in the Peerage of Great Britain	The Earl of Mount Edgcumbe	Robert Edgcumbe	9 Dec 1982	7 May 1997		XB.	
Earls in the Peerage of Great Britain	The Earl Fortescue	Charles Fortescue	7 Mar 1993	12 Dec 1995		Con.	
Earls in the Peerage of Great Britain	§ The Earl of Carnarvon, KCVO, KBE, DL	Henry Herbert	22 Sep 1987	7 Dec 1987		XB.	
Earls in the Peerage of Great Britain	The Earl Cadogan, DL	Charles Cadogan	4 Jul 1997	13 Nov 1997		Con.	
Earls in the Peerage of Great Britain	The Earl of Malmesbury, TD, JP	William Harris	12 Jun 1950	9 May 1951		Con.	
Earls in the Peerage of Ireland	The Earl of Cork and Orrery, DSC, VRD, FICE	John Boyle	8 Aug 1995	14 Mar 1996	L. Boyle of Marston	Con.	
Earls in the Peerage of Ireland	The Earl of Meath	John Brabazon	19 Dec 1998	25 Oct 1999	L. Chaworth	NA	
Earls in the Peerage of Ireland	The Earl of Drogheda	Derry Moore	24 Dec 1989	7 Mar 1990	L. Moore	XB.	
Earls in the Peerage of Ireland	The Earl of Granard	Peter Forbes	21 Nov 1992	5 May 1993	L. Granard	Con.	
Earls in the Peerage of Ireland	The Earl of Darnley	Adam Bligh	15 Jun 1980	14 Jan 1981	L. Clifton	Con.	
Earls in the Peerage of Ireland	The Earl of Egmont	Frederick Perceval	16 May 1932	––	L. Lovel and Holland	None	
Earls in the Peerage of Ireland	The Earl of Bessborough	Arthur Ponsonby	5 Dec 1993	9 Jun 1994	L. Ponsonby of Sysonby	Con.	
Earls in the Peerage of Ireland	The Earl of Carrick	David Butler	5 Oct 1992	7 May 1997	L. Butler of Mount Juliet	XB.	
Earls in the Peerage of Ireland	The Earl of Shannon, FRSA	Richard Boyle	29 Dec 1963	8 Apr 1964	L. Carleton	XB.	
Earls in the Peerage of Ireland	§ The Earl of Arran	Arthur Gore	23 Feb 1983	15 Jun 1983	L. Sudley	Con.	
Earls in the Peerage of Ireland	§ The Earl of Courtown	Patrick Stopford (Note: Held the office Captain of the Yeomen of the Guard after 1999.) (Note: Held the office Lord-in-waiting (Government Whip) after 1999.)	23 Jul 1975	26 Jul 1979	L. Saltersford	Con.	
Earls in the Peerage of Ireland	The Earl of Clanwilliam	John Meade	30 Mar 1989	11 Oct 1989	L. Clanwilliam	Con.	
Earls in the Peerage of Ireland	‡ The Earl of Longford, KG, PC	Frank Pakenham (Note: Held the office of Lord Keeper of the Privy Seal in 1964–1965 and 1966–1968.) (Note: Held the office of Leader of the House of Lords in 1964–1968.) (Note: Held a position in the Cabinet in the Government of the United Kingdom before 1999.)	4 Feb 1961 (Note: Created The Lord Pakenham on 12 October 1945.)	16 Oct 1945 (Note: Sat in the House of Lords as The Lord Pakenham until 4 February 1961 when he inherited the Earldom of Longford.)	L. Silchester	Lab.	
Earls in the Peerage of Ireland	The Earl of Enniskillen	Andrew Cole	30 May 1989	27 Apr 1992	L. Grinstead	XB.	
Earls in the Peerage of Ireland	The Earl Erne	Henry Crichton (Note: Held the office of Lord Lieutenant of Fermanagh at the time of the passing of the Act until 2012.)	23 May 1940	7 Jun 1961	L. Fermanagh	Con.	
Earls in the Peerage of Ireland	The Earl of Lucan	John Bingham	20 Jan 1964	27 Feb 1968 (Note: Missing since 7 November 1974, legally dead on 27 October 1999 with an official death certificate being issued on 3 February 2016 under the Presumption of Death Act 2013, Lord Irvine of Lairg (the Lord Chancellor at the time of passing of the Act), was unable to issue George Bingham, Lord Bingham a writ of summons to the House without a death certificate at the time.)	L. Bingham	NA	
Earls in the Peerage of Ireland	The Earl of Donoughmore	Richard Hely-Hutchinson	12 Aug 1981	3 Mar 1983	V. Hutchinson	Con.	
Earls in the Peerage of Ireland	The Earl of Limerick, KBE, DL	Patrick Pery	4 Aug 1967	14 Nov 1967	L. Foxford	Con.	
Earls in the Peerage of Ireland	‡ The Earl of Clancarty	Nicholas Trench	18 May 1995	24 Apr 1996	V. Clancarty	XB.	
Earls in the Peerage of Ireland	The Earl of Gosford	Charles Acheson	17 Feb 1966	14 Jun 1977	L. Worlingham	XB.	
Earls in the Peerage of Ireland	The Earl of Normanton	Shaun Agar	28 Jan 1967	1 Jul 1970	L. Mendip	NA	
Earls in the Peerage of Ireland	§ The Earl of Listowel	Francis Hare (Note: Resigned from the House of Lords under the House of Lords Reform Act 2014 on 21 July 2022.)	12 Mar 1997	5 Oct 1998	L. Hare	XB.	
Earls in the Peerage of Ireland	The Earl of Ranfurly	Gerald Knox	6 Nov 1988	5 May 1993	L. Ranfurly	XB.	
Earls in the Peerage of the United Kingdom	§ The Earl of Rosslyn	Peter St Clair-Erskine (Note: Holds the office of Lord Steward of the Household since 2023.)	22 Nov 1977	15 Jan 1980		XB.	
Earls in the Peerage of the United Kingdom	The Earl of Craven	Benjamin Craven	30 Aug 1990	––		None	
Earls in the Peerage of the United Kingdom	§ The Earl of Onslow	Michael Onslow	3 Jun 1971	22 Sep 1971		Con.	
Earls in the Peerage of the United Kingdom	The Earl of Romney	Michael Marsham	6 Sep 1975	16 Mar 1976		Con.	
Earls in the Peerage of the United Kingdom	The Earl of Chichester	John Pelham	21 Feb 1944	1 Feb 1966		Con.	
Earls in the Peerage of the United Kingdom	The Earl of Wilton	Francis Grosvenor (Note: Sat in the House of Lords as The Lord Ebury until 1 October 1999 when he inherited the Earldom of Wilton.)	1 Oct 1999 (Note: Succeeded to the Barony of Ebury on 5 May 1957.)	19 Nov 1957		Con.	
Earls in the Peerage of the United Kingdom	The Earl of Powis	John Herbert	13 Aug 1993	12 Jan 1995		XB.	
Earls in the Peerage of the United Kingdom	The Earl Nelson	Peter Nelson	21 Sep 1981	11 Dec 1984		XB.	
Earls in the Peerage of the United Kingdom	The Earl Grey	Richard Grey	2 Apr 1963	7 Apr 1976		LD	
Earls in the Peerage of the United Kingdom	The Earl of Lonsdale	James Lowther	11 Mar 1953	24 Nov 1953		Con.	
Earls in the Peerage of the United Kingdom	The Earl of Harrowby, TD	Dudley Ryder	7 May 1987	4 Nov 1987		Con.	
Earls in the Peerage of the United Kingdom	The Earl of Harewood, KBE	George Lascelles (Note: According to the Order of precedence in England and Wales, Scotland & Northern Ireland at the time of the passing of the Act, he was ranked as a Grandson of former Sovereign (George V) who was not a Duke.)	24 May 1947	7 Feb 1956		NA	
Earls in the Peerage of the United Kingdom	The Earl of Minto, OBE, JP, DL	Gilbert Elliot-Murray-Kynynmound	11 Jan 1975	6 May 1975		XB.	
Earls in the Peerage of the United Kingdom	‡ The Earl Cathcart	Charles Cathcart	15 Jun 1999	12 Oct 1999		Con.	
Earls in the Peerage of the United Kingdom	The Earl of Verulam	John Grimston	15 Apr 1973	12 Jun 1974		Con.	
Earls in the Peerage of the United Kingdom	The Earl of Saint Germans	Peregrine Eliot	11 Mar 1988	11 May 1988		Con.	
Earls in the Peerage of the United Kingdom	The Earl of Morley, KCVO	John Parker	28 Apr 1962	19 Feb 1964		Con.	
Earls in the Peerage of the United Kingdom	The Earl of Bradford	Richard Bridgeman	30 Aug 1981	27 Apr 1982		XB.	
Earls in the Peerage of the United Kingdom	The Earl of Eldon	John Scott	20 Oct 1976	14 Feb 1978		XB.	
Earls in the Peerage of the United Kingdom	§ The Earl Howe	Frederick Curzon (Note: Held the office of Deputy Leader of the House of Lords in 2015–2024.)	29 May 1984	30 Oct 1984		Con.	
Earls in the Peerage of the United Kingdom	The Earl of Stradbroke	Keith Rous	18 Jul 1983	––		None	
Earls in the Peerage of the United Kingdom	The Earl Temple of Stowe	Grenville Temple-Gore-Langton	28 Aug 1988	1 Mar 1990		XB.	
Earls in the Peerage of the United Kingdom	The Earl Vane		is the senior qualifying title for the Marquess of Londonderry. (Note: Junior qualifying title, The Lord Stewart (UK 1814).)				
Earls in the Peerage of the United Kingdom	The Earl Cawdor, DL	Colin Campbell	20 Jun 1993	20 Feb 1997		XB.	
Earls in the Peerage of the United Kingdom	The Earl of Munster, FRSA	Anthony FitzClarence	15 Nov 1983	18 Jan 1984		Con.	
Earls in the Peerage of the United Kingdom	The Earl of Lichfield, DL, FRPS	Patrick Anson	14 Dec 1960	7 Feb 1961		Con.	
Earls in the Peerage of the United Kingdom	The Earl Granville	Fergus Leveson-Gower	31 Oct 1996	––		None	
Earls in the Peerage of the United Kingdom	The Earl of Effingham, DL	David Howard	22 Feb 1996	12 Jun 1996		XB.	
Earls in the Peerage of the United Kingdom	The Earl of Ducie	David Moreton	12 Nov 1991	––		None	
Earls in the Peerage of the United Kingdom	The Earl of Yarborough	Charles Pelham	21 Mar 1991	10 Mar 1992		Con.	
Earls in the Peerage of the United Kingdom	The Earl of Leicester	Edward Coke	19 Jun 1994	20 Mar 1997		XB.	
Earls in the Peerage of the United Kingdom	The Earl of Gainsborough, JP	Anthony Noel	27 Aug 1927	15 Aug 1945		XB.	
Earls in the Peerage of the United Kingdom	The Earl of Lovelace	Peter King	4 Dec 1964	23 Mar 1993		XB.	
Earls in the Peerage of the United Kingdom	The Earl of Strafford	Thomas Byng	4 Mar 1984	25 Oct 1984		XB.	
Earls in the Peerage of the United Kingdom	The Earl of Cottenham	Charles Pepys	12 May 1968	29 Jul 1988		NA	
Earls in the Peerage of the United Kingdom	The Earl Cowley	Garret Wellesley	13 Dec 1975	6 Oct 1981		Con.	
Earls in the Peerage of the United Kingdom	The Earl of Dudley	William Ward	26 Dec 1969	3 Feb 1970		Con.	
Earls in the Peerage of the United Kingdom	§ The Earl Russell, FBA, FRHistS	Conrad Russell	16 Dec 1987	28 Mar 1988		LD	
Earls in the Peerage of the United Kingdom	The Earl of Cromartie	John Mackenzie	13 Dec 1989	15 Jan 1996		XB.	
Earls in the Peerage of the United Kingdom	The Earl of Kimberley	John Wodehouse	16 Apr 1941	9 Oct 1945		Con.	
Earls in the Peerage of the United Kingdom	The Earl of Wharncliffe	Richard Montagu Stuart Wortley	3 Jun 1987	––		None	
Earls in the Peerage of the United Kingdom	The Earl Cairns, CBE	Simon Cairns	21 Mar 1989	9 Nov 1989		XB.	
Earls in the Peerage of the United Kingdom	‡ The Earl of Lytton, FRICS	John Lytton (Note: Resigned from the House of Lords under the House of Lords Reform Act 2014 on 28 March 2026.)	18 Jan 1985	26 Jun 1985		XB.	
Earls in the Peerage of the United Kingdom	§ The Earl of Selborne, KBE, DL, FIBiol, FRS	John Palmer (Note: Resigned from the House of Lords under the House of Lords Reform Act 2014 on 26 March 2020.)	3 Sep 1971	23 Feb 1972		Con.	
Earls in the Peerage of the United Kingdom	The Earl of Iddesleigh, DL	Stafford Northcote	16 Feb 1970	30 Jun 1970		XB.	
Earls in the Peerage of the United Kingdom	The Earl of Cranbrook, FIBiol, FRGS, FRS, FZS, FLS	Gathorne Gathorne-Hardy	22 Nov 1978	13 Dec 1978		Con.	
Earls in the Peerage of the United Kingdom	The Earl of Halsbury, DL, FRS, FInstP, FIEE, FICE	Tony Giffard	15 Sep 1943	8 May 1945		XB.	
Earls in the Peerage of the United Kingdom	The Earl of Cromer	Evelyn Baring	16 Mar 1991	15 May 1991		XB.	
Earls in the Peerage of the United Kingdom	The Earl of Plymouth, DL, FRSA	Other Windsor-Clive	1 Oct 1943	7 Feb 1946		NA	
Earls in the Peerage of the United Kingdom	§ The Earl of Liverpool	Edward Foljambe	13 Mar 1969	18 Nov 1969		Con.	
Earls in the Peerage of the United Kingdom	The Earl Kitchener of Khartoum, TD, DL	Henry Kitchener	27 Mar 1937	29 Jul 1942		Con.	
Earls in the Peerage of the United Kingdom	The Earl Saint Aldwyn	Michael Hicks Beach	29 Jan 1992	2 Nov 1992		Con.	
Earls in the Peerage of the United Kingdom	The Earl Beatty	David Beatty	10 Jun 1972	––		None	
Earls in the Peerage of the United Kingdom	The Earl Haig, OBE, DL, FRSA	George Haig	28 Jan 1928	18 Jul 1939		Con.	
Earls in the Peerage of the United Kingdom	The Earl of Iveagh	Edward Guinness	18 Jun 1992	6 Feb 1996		XB.	
Earls in the Peerage of the United Kingdom	The Earl of Balfour	Gerald Balfour	28 Nov 1968	19 Feb 1969		Con.	
Earls in the Peerage of the United Kingdom	The Earl of Oxford and Asquith, KCMG	Julian Asquith	15 Feb 1928	28 Feb 1939		XB.	
Earls in the Peerage of the United Kingdom	‡ The Earl Jellicoe, KBE, DSO, MC, PC, FRS, FRGS, FRSGS	George Jellicoe (Note: Held the office of Lord Keeper of the Privy Seal in 1970–1973.) (Note: Held the office of Leader of the House of Lords in 1970–1973.)	20 Nov 1935	25 Jul 1939		Con.	
Earls in the Peerage of the United Kingdom	The Earl of Inchcape	Peter Mackay	17 Mar 1994	12 Jan 1995		Con.	
Earls in the Peerage of the United Kingdom	§ The Earl Peel, DL	William Peel (Note: Held the office of Lord Chamberlain of the Household in 2006–2021, HM's Permanent Lord-in-Waiting after appointment.)	22 Sep 1969	23 May 1973		Con.	
Earls in the Peerage of the United Kingdom	§ The Earl Baldwin of Bewdley	Edward Baldwin (Note: Resigned from the House of Lords under the House of Lords Reform Act 2014 on 9 May 2018.)	5 Jul 1976	14 Dec 1977		XB.	
Earls in the Peerage of the United Kingdom	The Earl of Halifax, JP, DL	Peter Wood	19 Mar 1980	5 Aug 1980		Con.	
Earls in the Peerage of the United Kingdom	The Earl of Gowrie, PC	Grey Hore-Ruthven	2 May 1955	11 Jun 1964		Con.	
Earls in the Peerage of the United Kingdom	The Earl Lloyd-George of Dwyfor, DL	Owen Lloyd George	1 May 1968	11 Jul 1968		XB.	
Earls in the Peerage of the United Kingdom	The Countess Mountbatten of Burma, CBE, CD, JP, DL	Patricia Knatchbull	27 Aug 1979	8 Jul 1987		XB.	
Earls in the Peerage of the United Kingdom	The Earl Alexander of Tunis	Shane Alexander	16 Jun 1969	27 Nov 1969		Con.	
Earls in the Peerage of the United Kingdom	The Earl of Swinton, JP, DL	David Cunliffe-Lister	27 Jul 1972	14 Nov 1972		Con.	
Earls in the Peerage of the United Kingdom	§ The Earl Attlee	John Attlee (Note: Resigned from the House of Lords under the House of Lords Reform Act 2014 on 26 February 2026.)	27 Jul 1991	11 Mar 1992		Con.	
Earls in the Peerage of the United Kingdom	The Earl of Woolton	Simon Marquis	7 Jan 1969	22 May 1980		Con.	
Earls in the Peerage of the United Kingdom	‡ The Earl of Snowdon, GCVO	Antony Armstrong-Jones (Note: Resigned from the House of Lords under the House of Lords Reform Act 2014 on 31 March 2016.)	6 Oct 1961 (Note: Created The Earl of Snowdon on 6 October 1961.)	28 Feb 1962		XB.	
Earls in the Peerage of the United Kingdom	The Earl of Stockton, MEP	Alexander Macmillan	29 Dec 1986	17 Feb 1987		Con.	
Viscounts in the Peerage of England	The Viscount Hereford	Robert Devereux	16 Apr 1952	27 Jan 1954		NA	
Viscounts in the Peerage of England	‡ The Viscount Cranborne, PC, DL	Robert Gascoyne-Cecil (Note: Held the office of Lord Keeper of the Privy Seal in 1994–1997.) (Note: Held the office of Leader of the House of Lords in 1994–1997.) (Note: Known by the courtesy title The Viscount Cranbourne, Gascoyne-Cecil was originally summoned to the House of Lords via a writ in acceleration of his father's junior title, The Lord Cecil. In 2003 he inherited the title Marquess of Salisbury.) (Note: Resigned from the House of Lords under the House of Lords Reform Act 2014 on 8 June 2017.)	29 Apr 1992	29 Apr 1992		Con.	
Viscounts in the Peerage of Scotland	§ The Viscount Falkland	Lucius Cary (Note: Resigned from the House of Lords under the House of Lords Reform Act 2014 on 21 March 2023.)	16 Mar 1984	15 May 1984		LD	
Viscounts in the Peerage of Scotland	The Viscount of Arbuthnott, KT, CBE, DSC, FRSE, FRICS, FRSGS	John Arbuthnott (Note: Held the office of Lord High Commissioner to the General Assembly of the Church of Scotland in 1986–1987.) (Note: Held the office of Lord Lieutenant of Kincardineshire at the time of the passing of the Act until 1999.)	15 Dec 1966	7 Feb 1968		XB.	
Viscounts in the Peerage of Scotland	§ The Viscount of Oxfuird, CBE	George Makgill	24 Jan 1986	14 Jul 1987		Con.	
Viscounts in the Peerage of Great Britain	The Viscount Bolingbroke and Saint John	Kenneth St. John	1 May 1974	––		None	
Viscounts in the Peerage of Great Britain	The Viscount Cobham	John Lyttelton	20 Mar 1977	28 Apr 1977		XB.	
Viscounts in the Peerage of Great Britain	The Viscount Falmouth, JP	George Boscawen	18 Feb 1962	6 Jun 1962		Con.	
Viscounts in the Peerage of Great Britain	The Viscount Torrington	Timothy Byng	28 Nov 1961	28 Jul 1964		Con.	
Viscounts in the Peerage of Great Britain	The Viscount Leinster		is the senior qualifying title of the Duke of Leinster. (Note: Junior qualifying title, The Lord Kildare (UK 1870).)				
Viscounts in the Peerage of Great Britain	The Viscount Hood	Henry Hood (Note: HM's Personal Lord-in-waiting since 2008.)	2 Oct 1999	21 Oct 1999		Con.	
Viscounts in the Peerage of Ireland	The Viscount Gormanston	Nicholas Preston	9 Jun 1940	12 Jul 1967	L. Gormanston	Con.	
Viscounts in the Peerage of Ireland	The Viscount Mountgarret	Richard Butler	2 Aug 1966	12 Dec 1966	L. Mountgarret	XB.	
Viscounts in the Peerage of Ireland	The Viscount Massereene and Ferrard	John Skeffington	27 Dec 1992	26 Apr 1993	L. Oriel	Con.	
Viscounts in the Peerage of Ireland	The Viscount Downe, DL	John Dawnay	8 Dec 1965	28 Jun 1966	L. Dawnay	Con.	
Viscounts in the Peerage of Ireland	The Viscount Midleton	Alan Brodrick	30 Oct 1988	18 Oct 1995	L. Brodrick	XB.	
Viscounts in the Peerage of Ireland	The Viscount Boyne	Gustavus Hamilton-Russell	14 Dec 1995	20 May 1998	L. Brancepeth	XB.	
Viscounts in the Peerage of Ireland	The Viscount Gage, DL	Henry Gage	30 Nov 1993	19 Jul 1994	L. Gage	Con.	
Viscounts in the Peerage of Ireland	The Viscount Powerscourt	Mervyn Niall Wingfield	3 Apr 1973	––	L. Powerscourt	None	
Viscounts in the Peerage of Ireland	The Viscount Monck	Charles Monck	21 Jun 1982	––	L. Monck	None	
Viscounts in the Peerage of the United Kingdom	The Viscount Saint Vincent, JP	Ronald Jervis	16 Feb 1940	11 Nov 1943		NA	
Viscounts in the Peerage of the United Kingdom	The Viscount Melville	Robert Dundas	26 Mar 1971	3 Mar 1976		Con.	
Viscounts in the Peerage of the United Kingdom	The Viscount Sidmouth	John Addington	7 Feb 1976	26 May 1976		XB.	
Viscounts in the Peerage of the United Kingdom	The Viscount Exmouth	Paul Pellew	2 Dec 1970	8 Feb 1972		XB.	
Viscounts in the Peerage of the United Kingdom	The Viscount Hutchinson		is the qualifying title for the Earl of Donoughmore.				
Viscounts in the Peerage of the United Kingdom	The Viscount Clancarty		is the senior qualifying title for the Earl of Clancarty. (Note: Junior qualifying title, The Lord Trench (UK 1815).)				
Viscounts in the Peerage of the United Kingdom	The Viscount Combermere	Michael Stapleton-Cotton	8 Feb 1969	5 Nov 1969		XB.	
Viscounts in the Peerage of the United Kingdom	The Viscount Hill	Antony Clegg-Hill	11 May 1974	––		None	
Viscounts in the Peerage of the United Kingdom	The Viscount Hardinge	Charles Hardinge	16 Jul 1984	5 Feb 1986		XB.	
Viscounts in the Peerage of the United Kingdom	The Viscount Gough, FRGS	Shane Gough	4 Dec 1951	8 Apr 1963		XB.	
Viscounts in the Peerage of the United Kingdom	The Viscount Bridport	Alexander Hood	25 Jul 1969	––		None	
Viscounts in the Peerage of the United Kingdom	The Viscount Portman	Christopher Portman	2 May 1999	29 Jun 1999		NA	
Viscounts in the Peerage of the United Kingdom	The Viscount Hampden, DL	Anthony Brand	4 Sep 1975	27 Jan 1976		XB.	
Viscounts in the Peerage of the United Kingdom	The Viscount Cross	Assheton Cross	14 Mar 1932	28 Nov 1944		Con.	
Viscounts in the Peerage of the United Kingdom	The Viscount Hambleden	William Smith	31 Mar 1948	23 Jul 1952		Con.	
Viscounts in the Peerage of the United Kingdom	The Viscount Knutsford, DL	Michael Holland-Hibbert	8 Mar 1986	24 Mar 1987		Con.	
Viscounts in the Peerage of the United Kingdom	The Viscount Esher, CBE	Lionel Brett	8 Oct 1963	15 Apr 1964		NA	
Viscounts in the Peerage of the United Kingdom	§ The Viscount Goschen	Giles Goschen	22 Mar 1977	21 Jul 1988		Con.	
Viscounts in the Peerage of the United Kingdom	The Viscount Ridley, KG, GCVO, TD, JP	Matthew White Ridley (Note: According to the Order of precedence in England and Wales & Northern Ireland at the time of the passing of the Act, he was ranked the Lord Steward of the Household.) (Note: Held the office of Lord Lieutenant of Northumberland at the time of the passing of the Act until 2000.)	25 Feb 1964	23 Apr 1964		XB.	
Viscounts in the Peerage of the United Kingdom	§ The Viscount Colville of Culross, QC, DCL	Mark Colville	14 Mar 1945	26 Jul 1954		XB.	
Viscounts in the Peerage of the United Kingdom	The Viscount Churchill	Victor Spencer	21 Dec 1973	––		None	
Viscounts in the Peerage of the United Kingdom	The Viscount Selby	Edward Gully	10 Jan 1997	––		None	
Viscounts in the Peerage of the United Kingdom	The Viscount Knollys, DL	David Knollys	3 Dec 1966	18 Jun 1986		Con.	
Viscounts in the Peerage of the United Kingdom	The Viscount Allendale	Wentworth Beaumont	16 Dec 1956	1 Apr 1958		Con.	
Viscounts in the Peerage of the United Kingdom	The Viscount Chilston	Alastair Akers-Douglas	10 Apr 1982	14 Nov 1985		Con.	
Viscounts in the Peerage of the United Kingdom	The Viscount Scarsdale	Francis Curzon	19 Oct 1977	23 Jul 1979		Con.	
Viscounts in the Peerage of the United Kingdom	The Viscount Mersey	Richard Bigham	2 Aug 1979	11 Nov 1980		Con.	
Viscounts in the Peerage of the United Kingdom	The Viscount Cowdray, DL	Michael Pearson	19 Jan 1995	8 May 1997		XB.	
Viscounts in the Peerage of the United Kingdom	The Viscount Devonport, FRSA	Terence Kearley	29 Mar 1973	6 Mar 1974		XB.	
Viscounts in the Peerage of the United Kingdom	§ The Viscount Astor	William Astor	7 Mar 1966	24 Jul 1973		Con.	
Viscounts in the Peerage of the United Kingdom	The Viscount Wimborne	Ivor Guest	17 Dec 1993	5 Dec 1996		XB.	
Viscounts in the Peerage of the United Kingdom	The Viscount Saint Davids	Colwyn Philipps	10 Jun 1991	17 Jul 1991		Con.	
Viscounts in the Peerage of the United Kingdom	The Viscount Rothermere	Jonathan Harmsworth	1 Sep 1998	26 May 1999		NA	
Viscounts in the Peerage of the United Kingdom	§ The Viscount Allenby	Michael Allenby	17 Jul 1984	6 Feb 1985		XB.	
Viscounts in the Peerage of the United Kingdom	The Viscount Chelmsford	Frederic Thesiger	30 Sep 1970	3 May 1989		Con.	
Viscounts in the Peerage of the United Kingdom	The Viscount Long, CBE	Richard Long	12 Jan 1966	26 Apr 1967		Con.	
Viscounts in the Peerage of the United Kingdom	‡ The Viscount Ullswater, PC	Nicholas Lowther (Note: Resigned from the House of Lords under the House of Lords Reform Act 2014 on 20 July 2022.) (Note: Held the office Captain of the Honourable Corps of Gentlemen-at-Arms before 1999.)	27 Mar 1949	24 Jul 1963		XB.	
Viscounts in the Peerage of the United Kingdom	‡ The Viscount Younger of Leckie, KT, KCVO, TD, PC, DL, FRSE, FRSGS	George Younger (Note: Held the office ofɳ̩ Lord High Commissioner to the General Assembly of the Church of Scotland in 2001.)	25 Jun 1997 (Note: Created a Life Peer on 7 July 1992.)	14 Jul 1992 (Note: Sat in the House of Lords as a Life Peer, The Lord Younger of Prestwick, until his death on 26 January 2003.)		Con.	
Viscounts in the Peerage of the United Kingdom	‡ The Viscount Younger of Leckie, KT, KCVO, TD, PC, DL, FRSE, FRSGS	George Younger	25 Jun 1997	23 Feb 1998		Con.	
Viscounts in the Peerage of the United Kingdom	The Viscount Leverhulme, KG, TD, JP	Philip Lever	27 May 1949	14 Dec 1949		Con.	
Viscounts in the Peerage of the United Kingdom	The Viscount Bearsted	Nicholas Samuel	9 Jun 1996	24 Oct 1996		Con.	
Viscounts in the Peerage of the United Kingdom	§ The Viscount Bridgeman, FCA	Robin Bridgeman	17 Nov 1982	23 Mar 1983		Con.	
Viscounts in the Peerage of the United Kingdom	§ The Viscount Craigavon, FCA	Janric Craig	18 May 1974	30 Jul 1974		XB.	
Viscounts in the Peerage of the United Kingdom	The Viscount Brentford	Crispin Joynson-Hicks	25 Feb 1983	6 Jul 1983		Con.	
Viscounts in the Peerage of the United Kingdom	The Viscount Buckmaster, OBE, FRGS	Martin Buckmaster	25 Sep 1974	3 Dec 1981		XB.	
Viscounts in the Peerage of the United Kingdom	§ The Viscount Bledisloe, QC	Christopher Bathurst	17 Sep 1979	18 Dec 1979		XB.	
Viscounts in the Peerage of the United Kingdom	‡ The Viscount Hanworth	David Pollock	31 Aug 1996	19 Nov 1996		Lab.	
Viscounts in the Peerage of the United Kingdom	‡ The Viscount Trenchard	Hugh Trenchard	29 Apr 1987	23 Nov 1988		Con.	
Viscounts in the Peerage of the United Kingdom	The Viscount Greenwood	Michael Greenwood	30 Jul 1998	4 Feb 1999		XB.	
Viscounts in the Peerage of the United Kingdom	The Viscount Samuel, OBE, FRSC	David Samuel	14 Nov 1978	5 Aug 1980		XB.	
Viscounts in the Peerage of the United Kingdom	The Viscount Runciman of Doxford, CBE, FBA	Garry Runciman	1 Sep 1989	4 Apr 1990		XB.	
Viscounts in the Peerage of the United Kingdom	The Viscount Davidson	Andrew Davidson	11 Dec 1970	27 Jan 1971		Con.	
Viscounts in the Peerage of the United Kingdom	The Viscount Weir, FRSA	William Weir	16 Aug 1975	3 Feb 1988		Con.	
Viscounts in the Peerage of the United Kingdom	The Viscount Caldecote	Piers Inskip	20 Sep 1999	––		None	
Viscounts in the Peerage of the United Kingdom	§ The Viscount Simon	Jan David Simon	5 Dec 1993	9 Jun 1994		Lab.	
Viscounts in the Peerage of the United Kingdom	The Viscount Margesson	Francis Margesson	24 Dec 1965	19 Jul 1966		NA	
Viscounts in the Peerage of the United Kingdom	The Viscount Daventry, JP	Francis FitzRoy Newdegate	19 Jan 1986	14 Jan 1988		Con.	
Viscounts in the Peerage of the United Kingdom	The Viscount Addison	William Addison	23 Mar 1992	17 Nov 1992		Con.	
Viscounts in the Peerage of the United Kingdom	The Viscount Kemsley	Richard Berry	28 Feb 1999	20 Oct 1999		NA	
Viscounts in the Peerage of the United Kingdom	The Viscount Marchwood	David Penny	6 Apr 1979	5 Dec 1979		Con.	
Viscounts in the Peerage of the United Kingdom	The Viscount Alanbrooke	Victor Brooke	19 Dec 1972	1 Mar 1977		XB.	
Viscounts in the Peerage of the United Kingdom	‡ The Viscount Montgomery of Alamein, CBE	David Montgomery (Note: Resigned from the House of Lords under the House of Lords Reform Act 2014 on 23 July 2015.)	24 Mar 1976	18 May 1976		Con.	
Viscounts in the Peerage of the United Kingdom	§ The Viscount Waverley	John Anderson (Note: Resigned from the House of Lords under the House of Lords Reform Act 2014 on 23 June 2025.)	21 Feb 1990	7 Jun 1993		XB.	
Viscounts in the Peerage of the United Kingdom	‡ The Viscount Thurso	John Sinclair (Note: Holds the office of Lord Lieutenant of Caithness since 2017.) (Note: Became the first and so far only Hereditary Peer who lost his automatic seat to become a Member of Parliament in the House of Commons in 2001.)	29 Apr 1995	31 Oct 1995		LD	
Viscounts in the Peerage of the United Kingdom	§ The Viscount Brookeborough, DL	Alan Brooke (Note: Holds the office of Lord Lieutenant of Fermanagh since 2012.) (Note: HM's Personal Lord-in-waiting since 1997.)	5 Mar 1987	11 Nov 1987		XB.	
Viscounts in the Peerage of the United Kingdom	The Viscount Norwich, CVO, FSA, FRGS, FRSL	John Julius Cooper	1 Jan 1954	20 Jul 1959		NA	
Viscounts in the Peerage of the United Kingdom	The Viscount Leathers,	Christopher Leathers	21 Jan 1996	12 Mar 1996		XB.	
Viscounts in the Peerage of the United Kingdom	The Viscount Soulbury	James Ramsbotham	30 Jan 1971	13 Dec 1984		XB.	
Viscounts in the Peerage of the United Kingdom	‡ The Viscount Chandos	Thomas Lyttelton	28 Nov 1980	24 Nov 1981		Lab.	
Viscounts in the Peerage of the United Kingdom	The Viscount Malvern	Ashley Huggins	28 Aug 1978	––		None	
Viscounts in the Peerage of the United Kingdom	The Viscount De L'Isle, MBE, DL	Philip Sidney (Note: Held the office of Lord Lieutenant of Kent in 2011–2020.)	5 Apr 1991	10 Jul 1991		Con.	
Viscounts in the Peerage of the United Kingdom	The Viscount Ingleby	Martin Peake	11 Oct 1966	24 Apr 1968		XB.	
Viscounts in the Peerage of the United Kingdom	The Viscount Monckton of Brenchley, CB, OBE, MC, DL, FSA	Gilbert Monckton	9 Jan 1965	10 Feb 1965		XB.	
Viscounts in the Peerage of the United Kingdom	§ The Viscount Tenby, JP	William Lloyd George (Note: Resigned from the House of Lords under the House of Lords Reform Act 2014 on 1 May 2015.)	4 Jul 1983	13 Dec 1983		XB.	
Viscounts in the Peerage of the United Kingdom	The Viscount Mackintosh of Halifax, FCA	Clive Mackintosh	2 Nov 1980	25 Mar 1981		Con.	
Viscounts in the Peerage of the United Kingdom	The Viscount Dunrossil, CMG, JP	John Morrison (Note: Held the office of Lord Lieutenant of the Western Isles at the time of the passing of the Act until 2000.)	3 Feb 1961	19 Mar 1964		XB.	
Viscounts in the Peerage of the United Kingdom	The Viscount Stuart of Findhorn	David Stuart	20 Feb 1971	13 Dec 1972		NA	
Viscounts in the Peerage of the United Kingdom	The Viscount Rochdale	St. John Kemp	24 May 1993	––		None	
Viscounts in the Peerage of the United Kingdom	§ The Viscount Slim, OBE, DL, FRGS	John Slim	14 Dec 1970	27 May 1971		XB.	
Viscounts in the Peerage of the United Kingdom	The Viscount Head	Richard Head	29 Mar 1983	21 Feb 1984		XB.	
Viscounts in the Peerage of the United Kingdom	The Viscount Boyd of Merton	Simon Lennox-Boyd	8 Mar 1983	5 Jul 1983		NA	
Viscounts in the Peerage of the United Kingdom	The Viscount Mills	Christopher Mills	6 Dec 1988	25 Jan 1990		Con.	
Viscounts in the Peerage of the United Kingdom	The Viscount Blakenham	Michael Hare	7 Mar 1982	5 May 1983		XB.	
Viscounts in the Peerage of the United Kingdom	‡ The Viscount Eccles, CBE	John Eccles	24 Feb 1999	21 Apr 1999		Con.	
Viscounts in the Peerage of the United Kingdom	The Viscount Dilhorne	John Manningham-Buller	7 Sep 1980	14 May 1981		Con.	
Barons in the Peerage of England	The Lord de Ros	Peter Maxwell	21 Apr 1983	––		None	
Barons in the Peerage of England	The Lord Hastings	Edward Astley	18 Jan 1956	25 Jul 1956		Con.	
Barons in the Peerage of England	The Lord FitzWalter, JP	FitzWalter Plumptre	28 May 1953 (Note: This Peerage which was abeyance was terminated rather than succeeded on the death of the previous holder.)	24 Jun 1953		NA	
Barons in the Peerage of England	The Lord Clinton, JP, DL	Gerard Fane-Trefusis	18 Mar 1965	5 May 1965		Con.	
Barons in the Peerage of England	The Lord de Clifford	John Russell	3 Jan 1982	––		None	
Barons in the Peerage of England	The Lord Zouche of Haryngworth	James Frankland	25 Sep 1965	22 Jan 1975		Con.	
Barons in the Peerage of England	The Baroness Willoughby de Eresby, DL	Jane Heathcote-Drummond-Willoughby	29 Mar 1983	25 Jan 1994		XB.	
Barons in the Peerage of England	§ The Lord Strabolgi	David Kenworthy (Note: HM's Extra Lord-in-Waiting 1998–2011.)	8 Oct 1953	28 Jan 1954		Lab.	
Barons in the Peerage of England	The Baroness Dacre	Rachel Douglas-Home	24 Feb 1970	28 May 1970		XB.	
Barons in the Peerage of England	§ The Baroness Darcy de Knayth, DBE	Davina Ingrams	23 Mar 1943	15 Jul 1969		XB.	
Barons in the Peerage of England	‡ The Lord Cromwell	Godfrey Bewicke-Copley	18 Aug 1982	4 Dec 1985		XB.	
Barons in the Peerage of England	The Lord Camoys, GCVO, PC, DL	Thomas Stonor (Note: According to the Order of precedence in England and Wales & Northern Ireland at the time of the passing of the Act, he was ranked the Lord Chamberlain of the Household, HM's Permanent Lord-in-Waiting after appointment, also HM's Personal Lord-in-Waiting 1992–1998.)	9 Mar 1976	29 Jul 1976		XB.	
Barons in the Peerage of England	The Lord Grey of Codnor, DL	Richard Cornwall-Legh	23 Dec 1996	11 Nov 1998		Con.	
Barons in the Peerage of England	‡ The Lord Berkeley, OBE, MICE, FRSA	Anthony Gueterbock	17 Oct 1992	15 Jul 1993		Lab.	
Barons in the Peerage of England	The Lord Latymer	Hugo Money-Coutts	24 May 1987	––		None	
Barons in the Peerage of England	The Baroness Dudley	Barbara Hamilton	19 Apr 1972	23 May 1973		NA	
Barons in the Peerage of England	The Lord Saye and Sele, DL	Nathaniel Fiennes	21 Oct 1968	15 Oct 1969		NA	
Barons in the Peerage of England	The Baroness Berners	Pamela Kirkham	30 Jun 1995	25 Oct 1995		Con.	
Barons in the Peerage of England	§ The Lord Willoughby de Broke, DL, FRSA, FRGS	David Verney (Note: Removed from the House of Lords under the House of Lords Reform Act 2014 on 9 July 2024.)	25 May 1986	24 Jul 1986		Con.	
Barons in the Peerage of England	The Lord Vaux of Harrowden	John Gilbey	1 Nov 1977	25 Jan 1978		Con.	
Barons in the Peerage of England	The Baroness Braye	Mary Aubrey-Fletcher	19 Dec 1985	9 Apr 1986		Con.	
Barons in the Peerage of England	The Lord Burgh	Alexander Leith	26 May 1959	14 Jul 1960		NA	
Barons in the Peerage of England	§ The Baroness Wharton	Ziki Robertson	4 Apr 1990	25 Jun 1990		XB.	
Barons in the Peerage of England	§ The Lord Saint John of Bletso	Anthony St John (Note: Resigned from the House of Lords under the House of Lords Reform Act 2014 on 27 March 2026.) (Note: HM's Extra Lord-in-Waiting since 1998.)	11 Feb 1978	12 Dec 1978		XB.	
Barons in the Peerage of England	The Lord Petre, DL	John Petre (Note: Held the office of Lord Lieutenant of Essex in 2002–2017.)	1 Jan 1989	20 Jul 1989		XB.	
Barons in the Peerage of England	The Lord Clifton		is the qualifying title of the Earl of Darnley.				
Barons in the Peerage of England	The Lord Dormer	Geoffrey Dormer	21 Dec 1995	––		None	
Barons in the Peerage of England	The Lord Teynham	John Roper-Curzon	5 May 1972	12 Jul 1972		Con.	
Barons in the Peerage of England	§ The Baroness Strange, FSAS	Cherry Drummond	10 Dec 1986	17 Dec 1986		XB.	
Barons in the Peerage of England	The Lord Stafford, DL	Francis Fitzherbert	8 Jan 1986	6 Apr 1987		Con.	
Barons in the Peerage of England	The Lord Byron	Robert Byron	15 Jun 1989	10 Oct 1989		Con.	
Barons in the Peerage of England	§ The Lord Lucas and Dingwall, FCA	Ralph Palmer	31 Dec 1991	4 Mar 1992		Con.	
Barons in the Peerage of England	§ The Lord Mowbray, Segrave and Stourton, CBE	Charles Stourton	7 May 1965	23 Jun 1965		Con.	
Barons in the Peerage of England	The Baroness Arlington	Jennifer Forwood	28 Apr 1999	27 May 1999		XB.	
Barons in the Peerage of England	The Lord Clifford of Chudleigh	Thomas Clifford	17 Mar 1988	28 Jun 1989		XB.	
Barons in the Peerage of England	The Lord Barnard, TD, JP	John Vane	19 Oct 1964	21 Jul 1965		XB.	
Lords of Parliament in the Peerage of Scotland	The Lord Forbes, KBE, JP, DL	Nigel Forbes	26 Nov 1953	7 Jun 1955 (Note: Elected as a Representative peer of Scotland before the Peerage Act 1963 and also as representative peer on 20 October 1959.)		Con.	
Lords of Parliament in the Peerage of Scotland	The Lord Gray	Angus Campbell-Gray	2 Oct 1946	18 Jul 1967		Con.	
Lords of Parliament in the Peerage of Scotland	§ The Lady Saltoun	Flora Fraser (Note: Resigned from the House of Lords under the House of Lords Reform Act 2014 on 12 December 2014.)	31 Aug 1979	13 Dec 1979		XB.	
Lords of Parliament in the Peerage of Scotland	The Lord Sinclair, CVO	Charles St. Clair	25 Nov 1957	27 Oct 1959 (Note: Elected as a Representative peer of Scotland before the Peerage Act 1963)		NA	
Lords of Parliament in the Peerage of Scotland	The Lord Borthwick	John Borthwick	30 Dec 1996	8 May 1997		XB.	
Lords of Parliament in the Peerage of Scotland	The Lord Lovat	Simon Fraser	16 Mar 1995	20 Jul 1998		Con.	
Lords of Parliament in the Peerage of Scotland	The Lord Sempill	James Sempill	6 Jul 1995	14 Dec 1995		Con.	
Lords of Parliament in the Peerage of Scotland	The Lady Herries of Terregles	Anne Cowdrey	31 Jan 1975	––		None	
Lords of Parliament in the Peerage of Scotland	The Lord Elphinstone	Alexander Elphinstone	19 Dec 1994	––		None	
Lords of Parliament in the Peerage of Scotland	The Lord Torphichen	James Sandilands	12 Jul 1975	26 Oct 1977		Con.	
Lords of Parliament in the Peerage of Scotland	The Lady Kinloss, FRAS	Mary Freeman-Grenville	17 Oct 1944	18 Feb 1964		XB.	
Lords of Parliament in the Peerage of Scotland	The Lord Balfour of Burleigh, FRSE, FIEE, CEng	Robert Bruce	4 Jun 1967	21 Nov 1968		XB.	
Lords of Parliament in the Peerage of Scotland	The Lord Napier, KCVO, DL	Nigel Napier	23 Aug 1954	9 Nov 1954		XB.	
Lords of Parliament in the Peerage of Scotland	‡ The Lord Fairfax of Cameron	Nicholas Fairfax	8 Apr 1964	15 Mar 1977		Con.	
Lords of Parliament in the Peerage of Scotland	§ The Lord Reay	Hugh Mackay	10 Mar 1963	29 Oct 1964		Con.	
Lords of Parliament in the Peerage of Scotland	The Lord Elibank	Alan D'Ardis Erskine-Murray	2 Jun 1973	5 May 1976		Con.	
Lords of Parliament in the Peerage of Scotland	The Lord Belhaven and Stenton	Robert Hamilton	10 Jul 1961	13 May 1964		Con.	
Lords of Parliament in the Peerage of Scotland	The Lord Rollo	David Rollo	25 Sep 1997	10 Dec 1998		XB.	
Lords of Parliament in the Peerage of Scotland	The Lord Polwarth, TD, DL, FRSA, FRSE	Henry Hepburne-Scott	1 Jan 1944	7 Aug 1945 (Note: Elected as a Representative peer of Scotland before the Peerage Act 1963 and also as representative peer on 1 March 1950, 31 October 1951, 7 June 1955 and 20 October 1959.)		Con.	
Barons in the Peerage of Great Britain	The Lord Boyle of Marston		is the qualifying title of the Earl of Cork and Orrery.				
Barons in the Peerage of Great Britain	The Lord Middleton, MC, JP, DL	Michael Willoughby	16 Nov 1970	28 Apr 1971		Con.	
Barons in the Peerage of Great Britain	§ The Lord Walpole and Walpole, JP	Robert Walpole (Note: Resigned from the House of Lords under the House of Lords Reform Act 2014 on 13 June 2017.)	25 Feb 1989	12 Oct 1989		XB.	
Barons in the Peerage of Great Britain	§ The Lord Monson	John Monson	7 Apr 1958	20 Apr 1961		XB.	
Barons in the Peerage of Great Britain	The Lord Ponsonby of Sysonby		is the senior qualifying title of the Earl of Bessborough. (Note: Junior qualifying title, The Lord Duncannon (UK 1834).)				
Barons in the Peerage of Great Britain	The Lord Boston	Timothy Irby	17 Feb 1978	20 Jul 1978		Con.	
Barons in the Peerage of Great Britain	The Lord Lovel and Holland		is the qualifying title of the Earl of Egmont.				
Barons in the Peerage of Great Britain	The Lord Vernon, JP	John Venables-Vernon	18 Mar 1963	19 Jul 1963		NA	
Barons in the Peerage of Great Britain	The Lord Digby		is the qualifying title of the Lord Digby.				
Barons in the Peerage of Great Britain	The Lord Brownlow	Edward Cust	28 Jul 1978	14 Dec 1978		NA	
Barons in the Peerage of Great Britain	The Lord Foley	Adrian Foley	3 Apr 1927	31 Jan 1945		NA	
Barons in the Peerage of Great Britain	The Lord Hawke, TD, FRICS	Edward Hawke	19 Aug 1992	4 Dec 1996		Con.	
Barons in the Peerage of Great Britain	The Lord Southampton	Charles Fitzroy	5 Jun 1989	12 Jul 1990		Con.	
Barons in the Peerage of Great Britain	The Lord Bagot	Heneage Bagot	2 Oct 1979	20 Oct 1981		Con.	
Barons in the Peerage of Great Britain	The Lord Dynevor	Richard Rhys	15 Dec 1962	1 Apr 1965		NA	
Barons in the Peerage of Great Britain	The Lord Walsingham, MC	John de Grey	29 Nov 1965	––		None	
Barons in the Peerage of Great Britain	The Lord Grantley	Richard Norton	24 Jun 1995	21 Jul 1995		XB.	
Barons in the Peerage of Great Britain	The Lord Rodney	George Rodney	13 Oct 1992	26 Apr 1993		Con.	
Barons in the Peerage of Great Britain	The Lord Somers	Philip Cocks	15 Feb 1995	––		None	
Barons in the Peerage of Great Britain	The Lord Carleton		is the qualifying title of the Earl of Shannon.				
Barons in the Peerage of Great Britain	The Lord Suffield, MC	Anthony Harbord-Hamond	2 Feb 1951	4 Apr 1951		Con.	
Barons in the Peerage of Great Britain	The Lord Tyrone		is the qualifying title of the Marquess of Waterford.				
Barons in the Peerage of Great Britain	The Lord Kenyon	Lloyd Tyrell-Kenyon	16 May 1993	27 Jul 1993		Con.	
Barons in the Peerage of Great Britain	The Lord Braybrooke	Robin Neville (Note: Held the office of Lord Lieutenant of Essex at the time of the passing of the Act until 2002.)	12 Feb 1990	14 Nov 1990		Con.	
Barons in the Peerage of Great Britain	The Lord Fisherwick		is the senior qualifying title of the Marquess of Donegall. (Note: Junior qualifying title, The Lord Templemore (UK 1831).)				
Barons in the Peerage of Great Britain	The Lord Gage		is the qualifying title of the Viscount Gage.				
Barons in the Peerage of Great Britain	The Lord Thurlow, KCMG	Francis Hovell-Thurlow-Cumming-Bruce	29 May 1971	10 May 1972		XB.	
Barons in the Peerage of Great Britain	The Lord Auckland	Robert Eden	28 Jul 1997	––		None	
Barons in the Peerage of Great Britain	The Lord Mendip		is the senior qualifying title of the Earl of Normanton. (Note: Junior qualifying title, The Lord Somerton (UK 1873).)				
Barons in the Peerage of Great Britain	The Lord Brodrick		is the qualifying title of the Viscount Midleton.				
Barons in the Peerage of Great Britain	The Lord Saltersford		is the qualifying title of the Earl of Courtown.				
Barons in the Peerage of Great Britain	‡ The Lord Carrington, KG, GCMG, CH, MC, PC, DL	Peter Carington (Note: Held the office of Leader of the House of Lords in 1963–1964.)	19 Nov 1938	9 Oct 1945		Con.	
Barons in the Peerage of Great Britain	The Lord Bolton, FRICS	Richard Orde-Powlett	15 Jun 1963	25 Feb 1964		NA	
Barons in the Peerage of Great Britain	The Lord Lilford	George Powys	19 Sep 1949	27 Oct 1959		NA	
Barons in the Peerage of Ireland	The Lord Digby, KCVO, JP	Edward Digby	29 Jan 1964	25 Feb 1964	L. Digby	Con.	
Barons in the Peerage of Ireland	The Lord Kensington	Hugh Edwardes	19 Aug 1981	31 Mar 1982	L. Kensington	NA	
Barons in the Peerage of Ireland	The Lord Sheffield, DL	Thomas Stanley	23 Jun 1971	14 Feb 1973	L. Stanley of Alderley	Con.	
Barons in the Peerage of Ireland	The Lord Rossmore	William Westenra	17 Oct 1958	7 Jun 1961	L. Rossmore	NA	
Barons in the Peerage of Ireland	§ The Lord Henley	Oliver Eden	20 Dec 1977	16 Mar 1978	L. Northington	Con.	
Barons in the Peerage of Ireland	The Lord Henniker, KCMG, CVO, MC, DL	John Henniker-Major	9 Feb 1980	26 Jun 1980	L. Hartismere	XB.	
Barons in the Peerage of Ireland	The Lord Carew	Patrick Conolly-Carew	27 Jun 1994	9 May 1995	L. Carew	XB.	
Barons in the Peerage of Ireland	The Lord Oranmore and Browne	Dominick Browne	30 Jun 1927	26 Jul 1927	L. Mereworth	NA	
Barons in the Peerage of the United Kingdom	The Lord Loftus		is the qualifying title of the Marquess of Ely.				
Barons in the Peerage of the United Kingdom	The Lord Ellenborough	Richard Law	19 May 1945	26 Mar 1947		Con.	
Barons in the Peerage of the United Kingdom	The Lord Sandys, DL, FRGS	Richard Hill (Note: After the death of the 7th Baron Sandys in 2013, the title merged with the Marquess of Downshire in the Peerage of Ireland through special remainder and became a subsidiary title and the junior qualifying title after the Earldom of Hillsborough and the Barony of Harwich in the Peerage of Great Britain.)	24 Nov 1961	4 Jul 1962		Con.	
Barons in the Peerage of the United Kingdom	The Lord Monteagle		is the qualifying title of the Marquess of Sligo.				
Barons in the Peerage of the United Kingdom	The Lord Granard		is the qualifying title of the Earl of Granard.				
Barons in the Peerage of the United Kingdom	The Lord Manners	John Manners	25 Nov 1972	24 Feb 1987		NA	
Barons in the Peerage of the United Kingdom	The Lord Grinstead		is the qualifying title of the Earl of Enniskillen.				
Barons in the Peerage of the United Kingdom	The Lord Foxford		is the qualifying title of the Earl of Limerick.				
Barons in the Peerage of the United Kingdom	The Lord Harris	Anthony Harris	30 Jun 1996	––		None	
Barons in the Peerage of the United Kingdom	The Lord Minster		is the qualifying title of the Marquess Conyngham.				
Barons in the Peerage of the United Kingdom	The Lord Silchester		is the senior qualifying title of the Earl of Longford. (Note: Junior qualifying title, The Lord Pakenham (UK 1945).)				
Barons in the Peerage of the United Kingdom	The Lord Oriel		is the qualifying title of the Viscount Massereene and Ferrard.				
Barons in the Peerage of the United Kingdom	The Lord Ravensworth, JP	Arthur Liddell	4 Aug 1950	19 Mar 1952		NA	
Barons in the Peerage of the United Kingdom	The Lord Delamere, JP	Hugh Cholmondeley	13 Apr 1979	––		None	
Barons in the Peerage of the United Kingdom	The Lord Forester, DL	George Weld-Forester	4 Jan 1977	10 Mar 1977		Con.	
Barons in the Peerage of the United Kingdom	The Lord Rayleigh	John Strutt	21 Apr 1988	18 Oct 1988		Con.	
Barons in the Peerage of the United Kingdom	The Lord Gifford, QC	Anthony Gifford	16 Apr 1961	21 Jun 1961		Lab.	
Barons in the Peerage of the United Kingdom	The Lord Ranfurly		is the qualifying title of the Earl of Ranfurly.				
Barons in the Peerage of the United Kingdom	The Lord Feversham	Peter Duncombe	4 Sep 1963	5 Jul 1966		XB.	
Barons in the Peerage of the United Kingdom	The Lord Seaford	Colin Ellis	9 Jul 1999	11 Oct 1999		Con.	
Barons in the Peerage of the United Kingdom	The Lord Plunket	Robin Plunket	28 May 1975	6 Jul 1976		Con.	
Barons in the Peerage of the United Kingdom	The Lord Heytesbury	Francis Holmes à Court	27 Nov 1971	30 Apr 1974		NA	
Barons in the Peerage of the United Kingdom	The Lord Clanwilliam		is the qualifying title of the Earl of Clanwilliam.				
Barons in the Peerage of the United Kingdom	§ The Lord Skelmersdale	Roger Bootle-Wilbraham	21 Jul 1973	11 Mar 1975		Con.	
Barons in the Peerage of the United Kingdom	The Lord Wynford, MBE, DL	Robert Best	29 Aug 1943	30 Apr 1946		Con.	
Barons in the Peerage of the United Kingdom	The Lord Kilmarnock	Alastair Boyd	15 May 1975	8 Nov 1976		XB.	
Barons in the Peerage of the United Kingdom	The Lord Kenlis		is the qualifying title of the Marquess of Headfort.				
Barons in the Peerage of the United Kingdom	The Lord Chaworth		is the qualifying title of the Earl of Meath.				
Barons in the Peerage of the United Kingdom	The Lord Poltimore	Mark Bampfylde	26 Mar 1978	4 Jul 1978		NA	
Barons in the Peerage of the United Kingdom	The Lord Mostyn, MC	Roger Lloyd-Mostyn	2 May 1965	27 JuN 1979		Con.	
Barons in the Peerage of the United Kingdom	The Lord de Saumarez	Eric Saumarez	20 Jan 1991	29 Apr 1992		NA	
Barons in the Peerage of the United Kingdom	The Lord Denman, CBE, MC, TD	Charles Denman	21 Mar 1971	27 Oct 1971		Con.	
Barons in the Peerage of the United Kingdom	The Lord Abinger, DL	James Scarlett	21 Jul 1943	25 Oct 1945		Con.	
Barons in the Peerage of the United Kingdom	The Lord Ashburton, KG, KCVO, DL	John Baring	12 Jun 1991	21 Jan 1992		XB.	
Barons in the Peerage of the United Kingdom	The Lord Hatherton	Edward Littleton	28 Sep 1985	––		None	
Barons in the Peerage of the United Kingdom	The Lord Worlingham		is the senior qualifying title of the Earl of Gosford. (Note: Junior qualifying title, The Lord Acheson (UK 1847).)				
Barons in the Peerage of the United Kingdom	The Lord Stratheden and Campbell	Donald Campbell	29 Oct 1987	18 Oct 1994		XB.	
Barons in the Peerage of the United Kingdom	The Lord Rossmore		is the qualifying title of the Lord Rossmore.				
Barons in the Peerage of the United Kingdom	The Lord Carew		is the qualifying title of the Lord Carew.				
Barons in the Peerage of the United Kingdom	The Lord de Mauley	Gerald Ponsonby	13 Sep 1962	2 Jul 1963		NA	
Barons in the Peerage of the United Kingdom	‡ The Lord Wrottesley	Clifton Wrottesley	23 Oct 1977	26 May 1993		Con.	
Barons in the Peerage of the United Kingdom	The Lord Sudeley, FSA	Merlin Hanbury-Tracy	26 Aug 1941	3 May 1961		Con.	
Barons in the Peerage of the United Kingdom	§ The Lord Methuen	Robert Methuen	24 Aug 1994	24 Sep 1975		LD	
Barons in the Peerage of the United Kingdom	The Lord Stanley of Alderley		is the senior qualifying title of the Lord Sheffield. (Note: Junior qualifying title, The Lord Eddisbury (UK 1848).)				
Barons in the Peerage of the United Kingdom	The Lord Leigh	John Leigh	24 Jun 1979	21 Nov 1979		Con.	
Barons in the Peerage of the United Kingdom	The Lord Monteagle of Brandon	Gerald Spring Rice	9 Dec 1946	8 Jul 1947		Con.	
Barons in the Peerage of the United Kingdom	§ The Lord Vivian	Nicholas Vivian	24 Jun 1991	16 Oct 1991		Con.	
Barons in the Peerage of the United Kingdom	The Lord Congleton	Christopher Parnell	12 Oct 1967	6 Feb 1968		XB.	
Barons in the Peerage of the United Kingdom	‡ The Lord Londesborough, TD, AMICE	Richard Denison	5 May 1968	27 Oct 1999		XB.	
Barons in the Peerage of the United Kingdom	The Lord de Freyne	Francis French	24 Dec 1935	8 Feb 1949		Con.	
Barons in the Peerage of the United Kingdom	The Lord Raglan, JP	FitzRoy Somerset	14 Sep 1964	1 Jun 1965		XB.	
Barons in the Peerage of the United Kingdom	The Lord Belper	Ronald Strutt	20 Mar 1956	21 Feb 1963		NA	
Barons in the Peerage of the United Kingdom	The Lord Chesham	Nicholas Cavendish	23 Dec 1989	7 Jun 1990		Con.	
Barons in the Peerage of the United Kingdom	The Lord Churston	John Yarde-Buller	9 Apr 1991	2 Feb 1993		Con.	
Barons in the Peerage of the United Kingdom	The Lord Leconfield and Egremont	John Wyndham	6 Jun 1972	8 May 1974		Con.	
Barons in the Peerage of the United Kingdom	The Lord Lyveden	Jack Vernon	12 Aug 1999	––		None	
Barons in the Peerage of the United Kingdom	§ The Lord Brougham and Vaux, CBE	Michael Brougham	20 Jun 1967	14 Feb 1968		Con.	
Barons in the Peerage of the United Kingdom	The Lord Westbury, CBE, MC, DL	David Bethell	26 Jun 1961	7 Mar 1962		Con.	
Barons in the Peerage of the United Kingdom	The Lord Annaly	Luke White	30 Sep 1990	16 Apr 1991		Con.	
Barons in the Peerage of the United Kingdom	§ The Lord Northbrook, FRGS	Francis Baring	4 Dec 1990	21 Oct 1991		Con.	
Barons in the Peerage of the United Kingdom	The Lord Monck		is the qualifying title of the Viscount Monck.				
Barons in the Peerage of the United Kingdom	The Lord Hartismere		is the qualifying title of the Lord Henniker.				
Barons in the Peerage of the United Kingdom	§ The Lord Hylton, DL	Raymond Jolliffe (Note: Resigned from the House of Lords under the House of Lords Reform Act 2014 on 27 July 2023.)	14 Nov 1967	3 Jul 1968		XB.	
Barons in the Peerage of the United Kingdom	The Lord Penrhyn, DSO, MBE	Malcolm Douglas-Pennant	3 Feb 1967	22 Jan 1968		Con.	
Barons in the Peerage of the United Kingdom	The Lord Brancepeth		is the qualifying title of the Viscount Boyne.				
Barons in the Peerage of the United Kingdom	The Lord O'Neill, TD	Raymond O'Neill (Note: Held the office of Lord Lieutenant of Antrim at the time of the passing of the Act until 2008.)	24 Oct 1944	28 Jun 1966		Con.	
Barons in the Peerage of the United Kingdom	The Lord Napier of Magdala	Robert Napier	29 Oct 1987	20 Apr 1988		XB.	
Barons in the Peerage of the United Kingdom	The Lord Gormanston		is the qualifying title of the Viscount Gormanston.				
Barons in the Peerage of the United Kingdom	The Lord Lawrence	David Lawrence	8 Oct 1968	6 Apr 1981		XB.	
Barons in the Peerage of the United Kingdom	The Lord Hare		is the qualifying title of the Earl of Listowel.				
Barons in the Peerage of the United Kingdom	‡ The Lord Acton	Richard Lyon-Dalberg-Acton	23 Jan 1989	13 Dec 1989		Lab.	
Barons in the Peerage of the United Kingdom	The Lord Wolverton, FRICS	Christopher Glyn	4 Jul 1988	23 Nov 1989		XB.	
Barons in the Peerage of the United Kingdom	The Lord O'Hagan	Charles Strachey	18 Dec 1961	5 Dec 1967		NA	
Barons in the Peerage of the United Kingdom	The Lord Sandhurst, DFC	John Mansfield	29 Oct 1964	30 Mar 1965		XB.	
Barons in the Peerage of the United Kingdom	The Lord Somerton		is the qualifying title of the Earl of Normanton.				
Barons in the Peerage of the United Kingdom	§ The Lord Aberdare, KBE, PC, DL	Morys Bruce (Note: Held the office of Deputy Leader of the House of Lords in 1970–1974.)	4 Oct 1957	5 Feb 1968		Con.	
Barons in the Peerage of the United Kingdom	The Lord Moncreiff	Harry Moncreiff	8 Dec 1942	26 Jun 1947		NA	
Barons in the Peerage of the United Kingdom	The Lord Coleridge	William Coleridge	20 May 1984	16 Mar 1994		Con.	
Barons in the Peerage of the United Kingdom	The Lord Cottesloe, JP	John Fremantle	21 Apr 1994	30 Nov 1994		XB.	
Barons in the Peerage of the United Kingdom	The Lord Hampton	Richard Pakington	17 Feb 1974	13 Jun 1974		LD	
Barons in the Peerage of the United Kingdom	The Lord Fermanagh		is the qualifying title of the Earl Erne.				
Barons in the Peerage of the United Kingdom	The Lord Harlech	Francis Ormsby-Gore	26 Jan 1985	3 Mar 1987		Con.	
Barons in the Peerage of the United Kingdom	The Lord Tollemache, DL	John Tollemache (Note: Held the office of Lord Lieutenant of Essex in 2003–2014.)	27 May 1975	25 Oct 1976		Con.	
Barons in the Peerage of the United Kingdom	The Lord Gerard	Anthony Gerard	11 Jul 1992	19 Dec 1995		XB.	
Barons in the Peerage of the United Kingdom	The Lord Sackville	Lionel Sackville-West	4 Jul 1965	10 Feb 1966		Con.	
Barons in the Peerage of the United Kingdom	The Lord Norton	James Adderley	24 Sep 1993	7 Nov 1995		XB.	
Barons in the Peerage of the United Kingdom	The Lord Trevor	Marke Hill-Trevor	1 Jan 1997	15 Dec 1998		Con.	
Barons in the Peerage of the United Kingdom	§ The Lord Ampthill, CBE, PC	Geoffrey Russell	3 Jun 1973	25 May 1976		XB.	
Barons in the Peerage of the United Kingdom	The Lord Brabourne, CBE	John Knatchbull (Note: The 8th Baron Brabourne inherited the Earldom of Mountbatten of Burma in the Peerage of the United Kingdom through special remainder after the death of the 2nd Countess Mountbatten of Burma in 2017 and title is now a subsidiary one.)	15 Sep 1943	19 Dec 1945		XB.	
Barons in the Peerage of the United Kingdom	The Lord Derwent, LVO, DL	Robin Vanden-Bempde-Johnstone	2 Jan 1986	18 Mar 1986		Con.	
Barons in the Peerage of the United Kingdom	The Lord Hothfield, MICE	Anthony Tufton	5 Feb 1991	17 Apr 1991		Con.	
Barons in the Peerage of the United Kingdom	The Lord Tennyson, DSC	Mark Tennyson	19 Oct 1991	20 Oct 1992		XB.	
Barons in the Peerage of the United Kingdom	The Lord Strathspey	James Grant of Grant	27 Jan 1992	––		None	
Barons in the Peerage of the United Kingdom	The Lord Monk Bretton, DL	John Dodson	29 Jul 1933	27 Jan 1948		Con.	
Barons in the Peerage of the United Kingdom	§ The Lord Northbourne, DL, FRICS	Christopher James (Note: Resigned from the House of Lords under the House of Lords Reform Act 2014 on 4 September 2018.)	17 Jun 1982	23 Nov 1982		XB.	
Barons in the Peerage of the United Kingdom	The Lord Sudley		is the qualifying title of the Earl of Arran.				
Barons in the Peerage of the United Kingdom	The Lord Powerscourt		is the qualifying title of the Viscount Powerscourt.				
Barons in the Peerage of the United Kingdom	The Lord Northington		is the qualifying title of the Lord Henley.				
Barons in the Peerage of the United Kingdom	The Lord Rothschild, GBE	Jacob Rothschild	20 Mar 1990	30 Apr 1991		XB.	
Barons in the Peerage of the United Kingdom	The Lord Revelstoke	John Baring	18 Jul 1994	––		None	
Barons in the Peerage of the United Kingdom	The Lord Monkswell	Gerard Collier	27 Jul 1984	22 Jan 1985		Lab.	
Barons in the Peerage of the United Kingdom	The Lord Ashbourne	Edward Gibson	3 Sep 1983	17 Nov 1983		Con.	
Barons in the Peerage of the United Kingdom	The Lord Saint Oswald	Charles Winn	18 Mar 1999	18 May 1999		Con.	
Barons in the Peerage of the United Kingdom	§ The Lord Montagu of Beaulieu	Edward Douglas-Scott-Montagu	30 Mar 1929	26 Nov 1947		Con.	
Barons in the Peerage of the United Kingdom	The Lord Deramore	Richard de Yarburgh-Bateson	23 Dec 1964	27 Apr 1965		NA	
Barons in the Peerage of the United Kingdom	The Lord Herschell	Rognvald Herschell	14 Oct 1929	––		None	
Barons in the Peerage of the United Kingdom	The Lord Hindlip	Charles Allsopp	19 Dec 1993	24 Mar 1994		Con.	
Barons in the Peerage of the United Kingdom	The Lord Grimthorpe, OBE, DL	Christopher Beckett	22 Feb 1963	17 Dec 1963		Con.	
Barons in the Peerage of the United Kingdom	The Lord Kensington		is the qualifying title of the Lord Kensington.				
Barons in the Peerage of the United Kingdom	The Lord Hamilton of Dalzell, DL	James Hamilton	31 Jan 1990	18 Jul 1990		Con.	
Barons in the Peerage of the United Kingdom	The Lord Saint Levan, DSC, DL, FRSA	John St. Aubyn	10 Jul 1978	24 May 1979		Con.	
Barons in the Peerage of the United Kingdom	The Lord Basing	Neil Sclater-Booth	18 Sep 1983	––		None	
Barons in the Peerage of the United Kingdom	The Lord de Ramsey, DL	John Fellowes	31 Mar 1993	23 Jun 1993		Con.	
Barons in the Peerage of the United Kingdom	§ The Lord Addington	Dominic Hubbard	26 Jun 1982	1 Jul 1986		LD	
Barons in the Peerage of the United Kingdom	The Lord Savile, JP, DL	George Lumley-Savile	3 Apr 1931	29 May 1946		Con.	
Barons in the Peerage of the United Kingdom	The Lord Ashcombe	Henry Cubitt	28 Oct 1962	8 Dec 1964		Con.	
Barons in the Peerage of the United Kingdom	The Lord Crawshaw	David Brooks	7 Nov 1997	8 Dec 1998		Con.	
Barons in the Peerage of the United Kingdom	The Lord Amherst of Hackney	William Cecil	22 Jul 1980	16 Dec 1981		XB.	
Barons in the Peerage of the United Kingdom	The Lord Newton	Richard Legh	16 Jun 1992	9 Dec 1992		Con.	
Barons in the Peerage of the United Kingdom	The Lord Dunleath	Brian Mulholland	3 May 1997	3 Mar 1998		XB.	
Barons in the Peerage of the United Kingdom	The Lord Swansea, DL	John Vivian	16 Nov 1934	4 Dec 1956		XB.	
Barons in the Peerage of the United Kingdom	The Lord Aldenham and Hunsdon of Hunsdon	Vicary Gibbs	25 Jan 1986	24 Jul 1986		Con.	
Barons in the Peerage of the United Kingdom	The Lord Dawnay		is the qualifying title of the Viscount Downe.				
Barons in the Peerage of the United Kingdom	The Lord HolmPatrick	Hans Hamilton	15 Feb 1991	9 Dec 1991		Con.	
Barons in the Peerage of the United Kingdom	The Lord Burton, JP, DL	Michael Baillie	28 May 1962	17 Jul 1963		Con.	
Barons in the Peerage of the United Kingdom	The Lord Glanusk, TD	Christopher Bailey	28 Jun 1997	10 Dec 1997		XB.	
Barons in the Peerage of the United Kingdom	The Lord Cranworth	Philip Gurdon	4 Jan 1964	15 Dec 1965		Con.	
Barons in the Peerage of the United Kingdom	§ The Lord Avebury	Eric Lubbock	21 Jun 1971	11 Oct 1971		LD	
Barons in the Peerage of the United Kingdom	The Lord Killanin	Redmond Morris	25 Apr 1999	22 Jul 1999		XB.	
Barons in the Peerage of the United Kingdom	The Lord Strathcona and Mount Royal, DL	Euan Howard	22 Feb 1959	6 May 1959		Con.	
Barons in the Peerage of the United Kingdom	The Lord Kinross	Christopher Balfour	20 Jul 1985	––		None	
Barons in the Peerage of the United Kingdom	The Lord Shuttleworth, FRICS	Charles Kay-Shuttleworth (Note: Held the office of Lord Lieutenant of Lancashire at the time of the passing of the Act until 2023.)	5 Oct 1975	13 Jan 1976		Con.	
Barons in the Peerage of the United Kingdom	‡ The Lord Grenfell	Julian Grenfell (Note: Resigned from the House of Lords under the House of Lords Reform Act 2014 on 1 October 2014.)	24 Sep 1976	16 Mar 1978		Lab.	
Barons in the Peerage of the United Kingdom	‡ The Lord Redesdale	Rupert Mitford	3 Mar 1991	20 Jun 1991		LD	
Barons in the Peerage of the United Kingdom	§ The Lord Burnham	Hugh Lawson	18 Jun 1993	26 Oct 1996		Con.	
Barons in the Peerage of the United Kingdom	The Lord Biddulph	Anthony Biddulph	3 Nov 1988	1 Mar 1989		Con.	
Barons in the Peerage of the United Kingdom	The Lord Ritchie of Dundee	Harold Ritchie	16 Nov 1978	20 Jun 1979		LD	
Barons in the Peerage of the United Kingdom	The Lord Hemphill	Patrick Martyn-Hemphill	19 Mar 1957	11 Dec 1957		Con.	
Barons in the Peerage of the United Kingdom	The Lord Joicey	James Joicey	14 Jun 1993	6 Mar 1996		XB.	
Barons in the Peerage of the United Kingdom	The Lord Nunburnholme	Charles Wilson	28 Jul 1998	5 Oct 1998		XB.	
Barons in the Peerage of the United Kingdom	The Lord Swaythling	Charles Montagu	1 Jul 1998	26 Oct 1998		XB.	
Barons in the Peerage of the United Kingdom	The Lord Blyth	Anthony Blyth	29 Oct 1977	3 Jul 1986		XB.	
Barons in the Peerage of the United Kingdom	The Lord Marchamley	William Whiteley	26 May 1994	––		None	
Barons in the Peerage of the United Kingdom	The Lord Gorell	Timothy Barnes	2 May 1963	29 Apr 1964		XB.	
Barons in the Peerage of the United Kingdom	The Lord Fisher, DSC	John Fisher	11 May 1955	27 Nov 1958		Con.	
Barons in the Peerage of the United Kingdom	The Lord Kilbracken, DSC, JP, DL	John Godley	13 Oct 1950	30 Apr 1952		Lab.	
Barons in the Peerage of the United Kingdom	The Lord Hardinge of Penshurst	Julian Hardinge	14 Jul 1997	27 Oct 1997		XB.	
Barons in the Peerage of the United Kingdom	The Lord de Villiers	Arthur de Villiers	10 Feb 1934	––		None	
Barons in the Peerage of the United Kingdom	The Lord Glenconner	Colin Tennant	4 Oct 1983	2 Feb 1984		LD	
Barons in the Peerage of the United Kingdom	The Lord Mountgarret		is the qualifying title of the Viscount Mountgarret.				
Barons in the Peerage of the United Kingdom	The Lord Aberconway, JP	Charles McLaren	23 May 1953	28 Oct 1953		Con.	
Barons in the Peerage of the United Kingdom	The Lord Rowallan	John Corbett	24 Jun 1993	10 Feb 1997		Con.	
Barons in the Peerage of the United Kingdom	The Lord Ashton of Hyde, TD, JP	Thomas Ashton	21 Mar 1983	30 Nov 1983		XB.	
Barons in the Peerage of the United Kingdom	The Lord Ravensdale, MC, FRSL	Nicholas Mosley	9 Feb 1966	31 Jan 1968		XB.	
Barons in the Peerage of the United Kingdom	The Lord Hollenden	Ian Hope-Morley	12 Apr 1999	12 Jul 1999		Con.	
Barons in the Peerage of the United Kingdom	The Lord Butler of Mount Juliet		is the qualifying title of the Earl of Carrick.				
Barons in the Peerage of the United Kingdom	The Lord Parmoor	Milo Cripps	5 Oct 1977	23 Mar 1982		NA	
Barons in the Peerage of the United Kingdom	The Lord Cunliffe, ARIBA	Roger Cunliffe	24 Nov 1963	16 Dec 1971		XB.	
Barons in the Peerage of the United Kingdom	§ The Lord Lyell, DL	Charles Lyell	22 Apr 1943	14 Feb 1961		Con.	
Barons in the Peerage of the United Kingdom	The Lord Wrenbury	John Buckley	30 May 1940	5 Jul 1949		XB.	
Barons in the Peerage of the United Kingdom	The Lord Faringdon	Charles Henderson (Note: HM's Personal Lord-in-waiting 1998–2008.)	29 Jan 1977	12 Apr 1978		XB.	
Barons in the Peerage of the United Kingdom	The Lord Shaughnessy, CD	William Shaughnessy	4 Oct 1938	3 May 1944		XB.	
Barons in the Peerage of the United Kingdom	The Lord Rathcreedan	Christopher Norton	15 May 1990	31 Jan 1991		XB.	
Barons in the Peerage of the United Kingdom	The Lord Somerleyton, GCVO, JP, DL	William Crossley (Note: Held the office of Master of the Horse in 1991–1998, also HM's Personal Lord-in-Waiting 1978–1992.)	15 Jul 1959	20 Oct 1959		XB.	
Barons in the Peerage of the United Kingdom	The Lord Carnock	David Nicolson	2 Oct 1982	18 Jan 1983		Con.	
Barons in the Peerage of the United Kingdom	The Lord Beaverbrook	Maxwell Aitken	30 Apr 1985	10 Jul 1985		Con.	
Barons in the Peerage of the United Kingdom	The Lord Gainford, FRGS	Joseph Pease	23 Sep 1971	2 Dec 1971		Con.	
Barons in the Peerage of the United Kingdom	The Lord Forteviot	John Dewar	25 Mar 1993	11 May 1994		Con.	
Barons in the Peerage of the United Kingdom	§ The Lord Colwyn, CBE	Anthony Hamilton-Smith (Note: Resigned from the House of Lords under the House of Lords Reform Act 2014 on 21 July 2022.)	29 May 1966	17 Jan 1967		Con.	
Barons in the Peerage of the United Kingdom	The Lord Gisborough	Richard Chaloner (Note: Held the office of Lord Lieutenant of North Yorkshire at the time of the passing of the Act until 2001.)	11 Feb 1951	20 Nov 1951		Con.	
Barons in the Peerage of the United Kingdom	The Lord Morris, FCA	Michael Morris	11 Mar 1975	27 Apr 1976		Con.	
Barons in the Peerage of the United Kingdom	The Lord Cawley	Frederick Cawley	25 Sep 1954	3 Nov 1954		Con.	
Barons in the Peerage of the United Kingdom	The Lord Terrington, DSO, OBE, FRSL	Montague Woodhouse	6 May 1998	––		None	
Barons in the Peerage of the United Kingdom	§ The Lord Glenarthur, DL	Simon Arthur	19 May 1976	5 Jul 1977		Con.	
Barons in the Peerage of the United Kingdom	The Lord Phillimore	Francis Phillimore	29 Mar 1994	24 Oct 1995		Con.	
Barons in the Peerage of the United Kingdom	The Lord Inverforth	Andrew Weir	6 Jun 1982	––		None	
Barons in the Peerage of the United Kingdom	The Lord Sinha	Arup Sinha	18 Jan 1999	––		None	
Barons in the Peerage of the United Kingdom	The Lord Cochrane of Cults, DL	Ralph Cochrane	15 Jun 1990	27 Oct 1990		Con.	
Barons in the Peerage of the United Kingdom	The Lord Clwyd	John Roberts	30 Mar 1987	17 Jun 1987		XB.	
Barons in the Peerage of the United Kingdom	‡ The Lord Russell of Liverpool	Simon Russell	8 Apr 1981	27 Apr 1982		XB.	
Barons in the Peerage of the United Kingdom	§ The Lord Swinfen, JP, FRICS	Roger Swinfen Eady	19 Mar 1977	24 May 1977		Con.	
Barons in the Peerage of the United Kingdom	‡ The Lord Meston, QC	James Meston	2 Jan 1984	29 Mar 1984		XB.	
Barons in the Peerage of the United Kingdom	The Lord Cullen of Ashbourne, MBE	Charles Cokayne	3 Nov 1932	23 Nov 1943		Con.	
Barons in the Peerage of the United Kingdom	The Lord Trevethin and Oaksey, OBE, JP	John Lawrence	28 Aug 1971	10 Dec 1974		Con.	
Barons in the Peerage of the United Kingdom	The Lord Glendyne, OBE	Robert Nivison	28 Jan 1967	26 Jun 1967		Con.	
Barons in the Peerage of the United Kingdom	The Lord Manton, DL	Rupert Watson	10 Jun 1968	25 Jul 1968		Con.	
Barons in the Peerage of the United Kingdom	The Lord Forres	Alastair Williamson	22 Sep 1978	12 Dec 1978		XB.	
Barons in the Peerage of the United Kingdom	The Lord Vestey, DL	Samuel Vestey (Note: According to the Order of precedence in England and Wales & Northern Ireland at the time of the passing of the Act, he was ranked the Master of the Horse, HM's Permanent Lord-in-Waiting after appointment.)	4 May 1954	10 Jul 1963		XB.	
Barons in the Peerage of the United Kingdom	The Lord Borwick, MC	James Borwick	30 Jan 1961	14 Apr 1961		NA	
Barons in the Peerage of the United Kingdom	The Lord Maclay, DL	Joseph Maclay	7 Nov 1969	17 Feb 1970		NA	
Barons in the Peerage of the United Kingdom	The Lord Bethell, MEP	Nicholas Bethell	2 Dec 1967	20 Dec 1967		Con.	
Barons in the Peerage of the United Kingdom	The Lord Darling, DL	Robert Darling	29 May 1936	27 Jul 1955		NA	
Barons in the Peerage of the United Kingdom	The Lord Banbury of Southam	Charles Banbury	29 Apr 1981	2 Nov 1992		Con.	
Barons in the Peerage of the United Kingdom	The Lord Merrivale, FRSA	Jack Duke	8 Jun 1951	14 Jul 1953		Con.	
Barons in the Peerage of the United Kingdom	The Lord Bradbury	John Bradbury	31 Mar 1994	19 Apr 1995		Con.	
Barons in the Peerage of the United Kingdom	The Lord Mereworth		is the qualifying title of the Lord Oranmore and Browne.				
Barons in the Peerage of the United Kingdom	§ The Lord Greenway	Ambrose Greenway	14 Sep 1975	14 Oct 1975		XB.	
Barons in the Peerage of the United Kingdom	The Lord Hayter, KCVO, CBE	George Chubb	3 Mar 1967	26 Jun 1967		XB.	
Barons in the Peerage of the United Kingdom	The Lord Cornwallis, OBE, DL, FRPSL	Fiennes Cornwallis	4 Jan 1982	21 Jul 1982		XB.	
Barons in the Peerage of the United Kingdom	The Lord Daresbury, DL	Peter Greenall	9 Sep 1996	13 Nov 1996		Con.	
Barons in the Peerage of the United Kingdom	The Lord Wraxall, DL	Richard Gibbs	28 Oct 1931	25 Oct 1950		NA	
Barons in the Peerage of the United Kingdom	The Lord Melchett	Peter Mond	15 Jun 1973	18 Oct 1973		Lab.	
Barons in the Peerage of the United Kingdom	The Lord Remnant, CVO	James Remnant	4 Jun 1967	26 Jul 1967		Con.	
Barons in the Peerage of the United Kingdom	§ The Lord Moynihan	Colin Moynihan	30 Apr 1997 (Note: The Barony of Moynihan was dormant on the death of the 3rd Baron on the 24 November 1991.)	8 May 1997		Con.	
Barons in the Peerage of the United Kingdom	The Lord Craigmyle	Thomas Shaw	30 Apr 1998	23 Jul 1998		XB.	
Barons in the Peerage of the United Kingdom	The Lord Dulverton	Gilbert Wills	17 Feb 1992	27 Mar 1995		XB.	
Barons in the Peerage of the United Kingdom	§ The Lord Luke	Arthur Lawson Johnston (Note: Resigned from the House of Lords under the House of Lords Reform Act 2014 on 24 June 2015.)	25 May 1996	9 Jul 1996		Con.	
Barons in the Peerage of the United Kingdom	The Lord Alvingham, CBE, DL	Robert Yerburgh	27 Nov 1955	3 Dec 1975		NA	
Barons in the Peerage of the United Kingdom	The Lord Baden-Powell	Robert Baden-Powell	9 Nov 1962	29 Oct 1964		NA	
Barons in the Peerage of the United Kingdom	‡ The Lord Ponsonby of Shulbrede, FIMMM, CEng	Frederick Ponsonby	13 Jun 1990	26 Jun 1991		Lab.	
Barons in the Peerage of the United Kingdom	The Lord Dickinson	Richard Dickinson	31 May 1943	15 Jul 1948		XB.	
Barons in the Peerage of the United Kingdom	The Lord Noel-Buxton	Martin Noel-Buxton	14 Jul 1980	7 Oct 1980		Con.	
Barons in the Peerage of the United Kingdom	The Lord Howard of Penrith, DL	Francis Howard	1 Aug 1939	26 Apr 1944		NA	
Barons in the Peerage of the United Kingdom	The Lord Rochester, DL	Foster Lamb	13 Jan 1955	23 Mar 1955		LD	
Barons in the Peerage of the United Kingdom	§ The Lord Selsdon	Malcolm Mitchell-Thomson (Note: Removed from the House of Lords under the House of Lords Reform Act 2014 on 11 May 2021.)	7 Feb 1963	30 Jul 1963		Con.	
Barons in the Peerage of the United Kingdom	The Lord Moyne	Jonathan Guinness	6 Jul 1992	20 Oct 1992		Con.	
Barons in the Peerage of the United Kingdom	The Lord Davies, DL, MICE	David Davies	25 Sep 1944	18 Jun 1986		LD	
Barons in the Peerage of the United Kingdom	The Lord Rankeillour	Peter Hope	2 Dec 1967	8 May 1968		Con.	
Barons in the Peerage of the United Kingdom	The Lord Brocket	Charles Nall-Cain	24 Mar 1967	22 Jun 1976		NA	
Barons in the Peerage of the United Kingdom	The Lord Milne, TD	George Milne	23 Mar 1948	14 Jul 1948		XB.	
Barons in the Peerage of the United Kingdom	The Lord Rennell	Tremayne Rodd	14 Mar 1978	5 Jul 1978		Con.	
Barons in the Peerage of the United Kingdom	The Lord Mottistone, CBE	David Seely	4 Dec 1966	15 Feb 1967		Con.	
Barons in the Peerage of the United Kingdom	The Lord Iliffe	Robert Iliffe	15 Feb 1996	9 Jul 1996		Con.	
Barons in the Peerage of the United Kingdom	§ The Lord Palmer	Adrian Palmer	26 Jun 1990	8 Oct 1990		XB.	
Barons in the Peerage of the United Kingdom	The Lord Rockley	James Cecil	6 Jan 1976	13 May 1976		Con.	
Barons in the Peerage of the United Kingdom	§ The Lord Elton, TD	Rodney Elton (Note: Resigned from the House of Lords under the House of Lords Reform Act 2014 on 29 October 2020.)	18 Apr 1973	5 Jul 1973		Con.	
Barons in the Peerage of the United Kingdom	The Lord Bingham		is the qualifying title of the Earl of Lucan.				
Barons in the Peerage of the United Kingdom	The Lord Wakehurst	John Loder	30 Oct 1970	27 Jan 1971		NA	
Barons in the Peerage of the United Kingdom	The Lord Hesketh, KBE, PC	Alexander Fermor-Hesketh	10 Jun 1955	30 Mar 1976		Con.	
Barons in the Peerage of the United Kingdom	The Lord Tweedsmuir	William Buchan	20 Jun 1996	20 Nov 1996		XB.	
Barons in the Peerage of the United Kingdom	The Lord Sysonby	John Ponsonby	21 Jan 1956	––		None	
Barons in the Peerage of the United Kingdom	The Lord Wigram, MC, JP, DL	Neville Wigram	3 Sep 1960	8 Jun 1961		Con.	
Barons in the Peerage of the United Kingdom	The Lord Riverdale	Anthony Balfour	26 Jun 1998	––		None	
Barons in the Peerage of the United Kingdom	The Lord May	Michael May	9 Mar 1950	26 Nov 1952		Con.	
Barons in the Peerage of the United Kingdom	The Lord Kennet	Wayland Young	11 Jul 1960	8 Nov 1960		Lab.	
Barons in the Peerage of the United Kingdom	The Lord Strathcarron	David Macpherson	14 Aug 1937	6 Feb 1945		Con.	
Barons in the Peerage of the United Kingdom	The Lord Catto	Stephen Catto	23 Aug 1959	25 Oct 1999		XB.	
Barons in the Peerage of the United Kingdom	The Lord Wardington	Christopher Pease	7 Aug 1950	27 May 1952		Con.	
Barons in the Peerage of the United Kingdom	‡ The Lord Windlesham, CVO, PC	David Hennessy (Note: Held the office of Lord Keeper of the Privy Seal in 1973–1974.) (Note: Held the office of Leader of the House of Lords in 1973–1974.)	20 Feb 1963	6 Mar 1963		Con.	
Barons in the Peerage of the United Kingdom	§ The Lord Mancroft	Benjamin Mancroft	14 Sep 1987	15 Mar 1988		Con.	
Barons in the Peerage of the United Kingdom	The Lord McGowan	Harry McGowan	5 Jul 1966	6 Nov 1974		Con.	
Barons in the Peerage of the United Kingdom	§ The Lord Denham, KBE, PC	Bertram Bowyer (Note: Resigned from the House of Lords under the House of Lords Reform Act 2014 on 26 April 2022.)	30 Nov 1948	13 Dec 1949		Con.	
Barons in the Peerage of the United Kingdom	The Lord Chatfield	Ernle Chatfield	15 Nov 1967	10 Jul 1968		NA	
Barons in the Peerage of the United Kingdom	§ The Lord Rea, FRCGP	Nicolas Rea	22 Apr 1981	15 Jul 1982		Lab.	
Barons in the Peerage of the United Kingdom	The Lord Cadman	John Cadman	5 Apr 1966	19 May 1992		Con.	
Barons in the Peerage of the United Kingdom	The Lord Kenilworth	Randle Siddeley	26 Dec 1981	16 Jun 1983		Con.	
Barons in the Peerage of the United Kingdom	The Lord Pender	John Denison-Pender	31 Mar 1965	22 Jun 1965		Con.	
Barons in the Peerage of the United Kingdom	The Lord Roborough	Henry Lopes	30 Jun 1992	9 Mar 1995		XB.	
Barons in the Peerage of the United Kingdom	The Lord Birdwood	Mark Birdwood	5 Jan 1962	14 Apr 1965		Con.	
Barons in the Peerage of the United Kingdom	The Lord Brassey of Apethorpe, OBE, JP, DL	David Brassey	28 Jun 1967	19 Feb 1975		Con.	
Barons in the Peerage of the United Kingdom	‡ The Lord Belstead, PC	John Ganzoni (Note: Held the office of Lord Keeper of the Privy Seal in 1988–1990.) (Note: Held the office of Leader of the House of Lords in 1988–1990.) (Note: Held the office of Deputy Leader of the House of Lords in 1983–1988.) (Note: Held the office of Lord Lieutenant of Suffolk at the time of the passing of the Act until 2003.)	15 Aug 1958	18 Dec 1958		Con.	
Barons in the Peerage of the United Kingdom	The Lord Stamp	Trevor Stamp	16 Nov 1987	14 May 1992		XB.	
Barons in the Peerage of the United Kingdom	The Lord Bicester	Angus Smith	15 Jan 1968	––		None	
Barons in the Peerage of the United Kingdom	The Lord Milford	Hugo Philipps	30 Nov 1993	3 Mar 1994		XB.	
Barons in the Peerage of the United Kingdom	The Lord Hankey	Donald Hankey	28 Oct 1996	14 Jan 1997		XB.	
Barons in the Peerage of the United Kingdom	The Lord Harmsworth	Thomas Harmsworth	2 Jun 1990	24 Jan 1991		Con.	
Barons in the Peerage of the United Kingdom	§ The Lord Rotherwick	Robin Cayzer (Note: Resigned from the House of Lords under the House of Lords Reform Act 2014 on 1 February 2022.)	11 Jun 1996	15 Oct 1996		Con.	
Barons in the Peerage of the United Kingdom	§ The Lord Glentoran, CBE, DL	Robin Dixon (Note: Resigned from the House of Lords under the House of Lords Reform Act 2014 on 1 June 2018.)	22 Jul 1995	8 Feb 1996		Con.	
Barons in the Peerage of the United Kingdom	The Lord Tryon, DL	Anthony Tryon	9 Nov 1976	2 Feb 1977		XB.	
Barons in the Peerage of the United Kingdom	The Lord Croft	Bernard Croft	11 Jan 1997	––		None	
Barons in the Peerage of the United Kingdom	The Lord Teviot	Charles Kerr	7 Jan 1968	29 Feb 1968		Con.	
Barons in the Peerage of the United Kingdom	The Lord Nathan	Roger Nathan	23 Oct 1963	12 May 1964		XB.	
Barons in the Peerage of the United Kingdom	The Lord Kindersley, DL	Hugo Kindersley	6 Oct 1976	30 Nov 1976		XB.	
Barons in the Peerage of the United Kingdom	The Lord Ironside	Edmund Ironside	22 Sep 1959	22 Jun 1960		Con.	
Barons in the Peerage of the United Kingdom	The Lord Latham	Dominic Latham	31 Mar 1970	24 Oct 1978		NA	
Barons in the Peerage of the United Kingdom	The Lord Wedgwood	Piers Wedgwood	25 Apr 1970	8 Dec 1976		Con.	
Barons in the Peerage of the United Kingdom	§ The Lord Geddes	Euan Geddes	2 Feb 1975	20 Jun 1975		Con.	
Barons in the Peerage of the United Kingdom	The Lord Bruntisfield, OBE, MC, TD	John Warrender	14 Jan 1993	28 Apr 1993		Con.	
Barons in the Peerage of the United Kingdom	§ The Lord Brabazon of Tara, DL	Ivon Moore-Brabazon (Note: Resigned from the House of Lords under the House of Lords Reform Act 2014 on 28 April 2022.)	11 Dec 1974	11 Nov 1976		Con.	
Barons in the Peerage of the United Kingdom	The Lord Keyes	Roger Keyes	26 Dec 1945	31 Oct 1946		Con.	
Barons in the Peerage of the United Kingdom	The Lord Hemingford	Nicholas Herbert	19 Jun 1982	24 Nov 1982		XB.	
Barons in the Peerage of the United Kingdom	§ The Lord Moran, KCMG	John Wilson	12 Apr 1977	18 Jan 1978		XB.	
Barons in the Peerage of the United Kingdom	The Lord Killearn	Victor Lampson	27 Jul 1996	12 Dec 1996		Con.	
Barons in the Peerage of the United Kingdom	The Lord Dowding	Piers Dowding	22 Nov 1992	21 Mar 1995		XB.	
Barons in the Peerage of the United Kingdom	The Lord Gretton	John Gretton	4 Apr 1989	23 Jul 1998		Con.	
Barons in the Peerage of the United Kingdom	The Lord Westwood	William Westwood	8 Nov 1991	15 Jan 1992		XB.	
Barons in the Peerage of the United Kingdom	The Lord Hazlerigg, MC, TD, DL	Arthur Hazlerigg	25 May 1949	11 Nov 1952		NA	
Barons in the Peerage of the United Kingdom	‡ The Lord Hacking	David Hacking	7 Nov 1971	9 Feb 1972		Lab.	
Barons in the Peerage of the United Kingdom	The Lord Balfour of Inchrye	Ian Balfour	21 Sep 1988	15 Mar 1990		XB.	
Barons in the Peerage of the United Kingdom	The Lord Chetwode	Philip Chetwode	6 Jul 1950	27 Oct 1959		NA	
Barons in the Peerage of the United Kingdom	The Lord Sandford, DSC	John Edmondson	16 May 1959	16 Jul 1959		Con.	
Barons in the Peerage of the United Kingdom	The Lord Broadbridge	Peter Broadbridge	18 Nov 1972	28 Jan 1975		XB.	
Barons in the Peerage of the United Kingdom	The Lord Broughshane, DSO, DFC	William Davison	22 Sep 1995	9 Jan 1996		XB.	
Barons in the Peerage of the United Kingdom	The Lord Mountevans	Edward Evans	12 Dec 1974	13 Jun 1980		Con.	
Barons in the Peerage of the United Kingdom	The Lord Lindsay of Birker	James Lindsay	13 Feb 1994	17 Jul 1995		XB.	
Barons in the Peerage of the United Kingdom	The Lord Piercy	James Piercy	22 Mar 1981	––		None	
Barons in the Peerage of the United Kingdom	‡ The Lord Chorley	Roger Chorley (Note: Resigned from the House of Lords under the House of Lords Reform Act 2014 on 17 November 2014.)	27 Jan 1978	18 May 1978		XB.	
Barons in the Peerage of the United Kingdom	The Lord Calverley	Charles Muff	4 Jun 1971	16 Jan 1997		LD	
Barons in the Peerage of the United Kingdom	The Lord Tedder	Robin Tedder	18 Feb 1994	––		None	
Barons in the Peerage of the United Kingdom	The Lord Colgrain	David Campbell	20 Oct 1973	2 Apr 1981		XB.	
Barons in the Peerage of the United Kingdom	The Lord Darwen	Roger Davies	9 Dec 1988	––		None	
Barons in the Peerage of the United Kingdom	The Lord Wilson	Patrick Wilson	31 Dec 1964	––		None	
Barons in the Peerage of the United Kingdom	The Lord Lucas of Chilworth	Michael Lucas	11 Oct 1967	22 Jan 1968		Con.	
Barons in the Peerage of the United Kingdom	‡ The Lord Shepherd, PC	Malcolm Shepherd (Note: Held the office of Lord Keeper of the Privy Seal in 1974–1976.) (Note: Held the office of Leader of the House of Lords in 1974–1976.) (Note: Held the office of Deputy Leader of the House of Lords in 1968–1970.)	4 Dec 1954	8 Mar 1955		Lab.	
Barons in the Peerage of the United Kingdom	The Lord Citrine	Ronald Citrine	18 Mar 1997	––		None	
Barons in the Peerage of the United Kingdom	The Lord Newall, DL	Francis Newall	30 Nov 1963	18 Mar 1964		Con.	
Barons in the Peerage of the United Kingdom	The Lord Rugby	Robert Maffey	12 Jan 1990	15 May 1990		XB.	
Barons in the Peerage of the United Kingdom	The Lord Layton	Geoffrey Layton	23 Jan 1989	9 Mar 1989		Con.	
Barons in the Peerage of the United Kingdom	The Lord Simon of Wythenshawe	Roger Simon	3 Oct 1960	––		None	
Barons in the Peerage of the United Kingdom	The Lord Kershaw	John Kershaw	22 Feb 1962	5 Nov 1968		NA	
Barons in the Peerage of the United Kingdom	§ The Lord Trefgarne, PC	David Trefgarne (Note: Resigned from the House of Lords under the House of Lords Reform Act 2014 on 27 March 2026.)	27 Sep 1960	3 Jul 1962		Con.	
Barons in the Peerage of the United Kingdom	The Lord Crook	Douglas Crook	10 Mar 1989	1 Nov 1989		XB.	
Barons in the Peerage of the United Kingdom	The Lord Amwell	Keith Montague	12 Oct 1990	29 Jan 1991		XB.	
Barons in the Peerage of the United Kingdom	The Lord Milverton	Fraser Richards	27 Oct 1978	20 Feb 1979		Con.	
Barons in the Peerage of the United Kingdom	The Lord Clydesmuir	David Colville	2 Oct 1996	––		None	
Barons in the Peerage of the United Kingdom	The Lord Macdonald of Gwaenysgor	Gordon MacDonald	20 Jan 1966	––		None	
Barons in the Peerage of the United Kingdom	The Lord Burden	Andrew Burden	25 Jun 1995	––		None	
Barons in the Peerage of the United Kingdom	The Lord Haden-Guest	Christopher Haden-Guest	8 Apr 1996	21 Jul 1997		XB.	
Barons in the Peerage of the United Kingdom	The Lord Hives	Matthew Hives	8 Oct 1997	3 Mar 1998		XB.	
Barons in the Peerage of the United Kingdom	The Lord Greenhill	Malcolm Greenhill	28 Sep 1989	––		None	
Barons in the Peerage of the United Kingdom	The Lord Ogmore	Gwilym Rees-Williams	30 Aug 1976	7 Dec 1976		LD	
Barons in the Peerage of the United Kingdom	The Lord Morris of Kenwood	Philip Morris	1 Jul 1954	15 Nov 1954		XB.	
Barons in the Peerage of the United Kingdom	The Lord Macpherson of Drumochter	James Macpherson	11 Jun 1965	2 Aug 1965		Con.	
Barons in the Peerage of the United Kingdom	The Lord Kenswood	John Whitfield	21 Apr 1963	––		None	
Barons in the Peerage of the United Kingdom	§ The Lord Freyberg	Valerian Freyberg	26 May 1993	12 Jul 1994		XB.	
Barons in the Peerage of the United Kingdom	§ The Lord Milner of Leeds, AE	Michael Milner	16 Jul 1967	24 Oct 1967		Lab.	
Barons in the Peerage of the United Kingdom	The Lord Kirkwood	David Kirkwood	9 Mar 1970	21 Dec 1982		LD	
Barons in the Peerage of the United Kingdom	The Lord Wise	John Wise	20 Nov 1968	11 Dec 1968		Con.	
Barons in the Peerage of the United Kingdom	The Lord Jeffreys	Christopher Jeffreys	13 Feb 1986	13 Dec 1990		Con.	
Barons in the Peerage of the United Kingdom	The Lord Rathcavan, DL	Hugh O'Neill	20 Dec 1994	23 Mar 1995		XB.	
Barons in the Peerage of the United Kingdom	The Lord Baillieu	James Baillieu	18 Apr 1973	14 Jan 1976		NA	
Barons in the Peerage of the United Kingdom	‡ The Lord Grantchester	John Suenson-Taylor	12 Aug 1995	10 Jan 1996		Lab.	
Barons in the Peerage of the United Kingdom	The Lord Moore		is the qualifying title of the Earl of Drogheda.				
Barons in the Peerage of the United Kingdom	The Lord Strang	Colin Strang	27 May 1978	––		None	
Barons in the Peerage of the United Kingdom	The Lord Coleraine	James Law	15 Nov 1980	16 Jul 1981		Con.	
Barons in the Peerage of the United Kingdom	The Lord Harvey of Tasburgh	Peter Harvey	29 Nov 1968	27 Feb 1969		NA	
Barons in the Peerage of the United Kingdom	The Lord Gridley	Richard Gridley	15 Jun 1996	19 May 1997		LD	
Barons in the Peerage of the United Kingdom	The Lord Strathalmond	William Fraser	27 Oct 1976	19 May 1977		XB.	
Barons in the Peerage of the United Kingdom	§ The Lord Strathclyde, PC	Thomas Galbraith (Note: Held the office of Leader of the House of Lords in 2010–2013.)	12 Jul 1985	25 Mar 1986		Con.	
Barons in the Peerage of the United Kingdom	The Lord Clitheroe, DL	Ralph Assheton	18 Sep 1984	24 Oct 1984		Con.	
Barons in the Peerage of the United Kingdom	The Lord McNair	Duncan McNair	7 Aug 1989	4 Apr 1990		LD	
Barons in the Peerage of the United Kingdom	The Lord Colyton	Alisdair Hopkinson	6 Jan 1996	29 Oct 1998		XB.	
Barons in the Peerage of the United Kingdom	§ The Lord Astor of Hever, DL	John Astor (Note: Resigned from the House of Lords under the House of Lords Reform Act 2014 on 22 July 2022.)	28 Jun 1984	19 Jan 1987		Con.	
Barons in the Peerage of the United Kingdom	The Lord Sinclair of Cleeve	John Sinclair	27 Aug 1985	––		None	
Barons in the Peerage of the United Kingdom	§ The Lord Bridges, GCMG	Thomas Bridges (Note: Removed from the House of Lords under the House of Lords Reform Act 2014 on 18 May 2016.)	27 Aug 1969	24 Feb 1975		XB.	
Barons in the Peerage of the United Kingdom	The Lord Norrie	George Norrie	25 May 1977	9 Feb 1978		Con.	
Barons in the Peerage of the United Kingdom	The Lord Birkett	Michael Birkett	10 Feb 1962	27 Oct 1964		XB.	
Barons in the Peerage of the United Kingdom	The Lord Harding of Petherton	John Harding	20 Jan 1989	25 Jul 1989		Con.	
Barons in the Peerage of the United Kingdom	The Lord Poole	David Poole	28 Jan 1993	20 Apr 1993		Con.	
Barons in the Peerage of the United Kingdom	The Lord Rootes	Nicholas Rootes	17 Jan 1992	––		None	
Barons in the Peerage of the United Kingdom	The Lord Netherthorpe	James Turner	4 Nov 1982	15 May 1995		XB.	
Barons in the Peerage of the United Kingdom	§ The Lord Crathorne, JP, FRSA	James Dugdale (Note: Held the office of Lord Lieutenant of North Yorkshire at the time of the passing of the Act until 2014.)	26 Mar 1977	15 Jun 1977		Con.	
Barons in the Peerage of the United Kingdom	The Lord Spens	Patrick Spens	23 Nov 1984	30 Nov 1992		XB.	
Barons in the Peerage of the United Kingdom	The Lord MacAndrew	Christopher MacAndrew	9 Jul 1989	27 Nov 1990		Con.	
Barons in the Peerage of the United Kingdom	The Lord Nelson of Stafford	Henry Nelson	19 Jan 1995	19 Jul 1995		XB.	
Barons in the Peerage of the United Kingdom	The Lord Howick of Glendale	Charles Baring	10 Mar 1973	––		None	
Barons in the Peerage of the United Kingdom	The Lord Gladwyn	Miles Jebb	24 Oct 1996	4 Dec 1996		XB.	
Barons in the Peerage of the United Kingdom	‡ The Lord Cobbold, DL	David Lytton Cobbold (Note: Resigned from the House of Lords under the House of Lords Reform Act 2014 on 13 October 2014.)	1 Nov 1987	10 Mar 1988		XB.	
Barons in the Peerage of the United Kingdom	The Lord Robertson of Oakridge	William Robertson	29 Apr 1974	3 Jul 1974		XB.	
Barons in the Peerage of the United Kingdom	The Lord Marks of Broughton	Simon Marks	9 Sep 1998	22 Jul 1999		NA	
Barons in the Peerage of the United Kingdom	The Lord Fairhaven, DL	Ailwyn Broughton	6 Apr 1973	30 Jan 1975		Con.	
Barons in the Peerage of the United Kingdom	The Lord Leighton of Saint Mellons	Robert Seager	28 Apr 1998	––		None	
Barons in the Peerage of the United Kingdom	The Lord Brain	Christopher Brain	29 Dec 1966	9 May 1967		XB.	
Barons in the Peerage of the United Kingdom	‡ The Lord Aldington, KCMG, CBE, DSO, TD, PC, DL	Toby Low	29 Jan 1962 (Note: Created The Lord Aldington on 29 January 1962.)	21 Feb 1962		Con.	
Barons in the Peerage of the United Kingdom	The Lord Inchyra	Robert Millar	16 Oct 1989	1 May 1990		XB.	
Barons in the Peerage of the United Kingdom	The Lord Silsoe, QC	David Trustram Eve	3 Dec 1976	––		None	
Barons in the Peerage of the United Kingdom	The Lord Thomson of Fleet	Kenneth Thomson	4 Aug 1976	––		None	
Barons in the Peerage of the United Kingdom	The Lord Martonmere	John Robinson	3 May 1989	26 Oct 1992		XB.	
Barons in the Peerage of the United Kingdom	The Lord Sherfield	Christopher Makins	9 Nov 1996	––		None	
Barons in the Peerage of the United Kingdom	§ The Lord Inglewood, MEP, DL	Richard Fletcher-Vane	22 Jun 1989	7 Dec 1989		Con.	
Barons in the Peerage of the United Kingdom	The Lord Glendevon	Julian Hope	18 Jan 1996	––		None	
Barons in the Peerage of the United Kingdom	The Lord Grimston of Westbury	Robert Grimston	8 Dec 1979	14 Feb 1980		Con.	
Barons in the Peerage of the United Kingdom	‡ The Lord Erroll of Hale, TD, PC	Frederick Erroll	19 Dec 1964 (Note: Created The Lord Erroll of Hale on 19 December 1964.)	10 Feb 1965		Con.	
Barons in the Peerage of the United Kingdom	The Lord Renwick	Harry Renwick	30 Sep 1973	21 May 1974		Con.	
Barons in the Peerage of the United Kingdom	The Lord Saint Helens	Richard Hughes-Young	27 Dec 1980	4 May 1982		Con.	
Barons in the Peerage of the United Kingdom	The Lord Margadale, TD, DL	James Morrison	25 May 1996	––		None	

== Hereditary peers given life peerages ==
The following 10 peers were excluded from sitting in the House of Lords by virtue of their hereditary titles, and were not part of the 92 excepted hereditary peers. New life peerages were offered to hereditary peers of first creation (Earl of Longford as Lord Pakenham (who was also a former Leader of the House of Lords), Earl of Snowdon, Lord Aldington and Lord Erroll of Hale) and to previous Leaders of the House of Lords (Lord Carrington 1963–1964, Earl of Longford 1964–1968, Earl Jellicoe 1970–1973, Lord Windlesham 1973–1974, Lord Shepherd 1974–1976, Lord Belstead 1988–1990 and Viscount Cranborne 1994–1997) to allow their continued membership after the passage of the House of Lords Act 1999.

Prior to the act Quintin Hogg (who was a former Leader of the House 1960–1963 as The Viscount Hailsham) had disclaimed his hereditary peerage in 1963, but had returned to the House as a life peer when he became the Lord High Chancellor of Great Britain in 1970 and took up his seat on the Woolsack. Also two hereditary peers had been created life peers prior to their successions to their hereditary peerages. They continued to sit in the House by virtue of their life peerages following the exclusion of hereditary peers.

Excluded Hereditary peers given life peerages before commencement of the House of Lords Act 1999
Title	Name	Date succeeded	Aff.	Life peerage
The Earl of Longford	Frank Pakenham (Note: Commonly known by the higher grade title Earl of Longford in the Peerage of Ireland, when his brother Edward Pakenham, 6th Earl of Longford died in 1961, which he inherited the Earldom of Longford which Irish Peers did not carry an entitlement to a seat in House of Lords, he had sat in the House as either his own outright title as Baron Pakenham or the Baron Silchester which was created for Thomas Pakenham, 2nd Earl of Longford in 1821; Pakenham was considered a peer of first creation by virtue of the title The Baron Pakenham, conferred on him in 1945, in his own right.)	12 Oct 1945	Lab.	Baron Pakenham of Cowley
The Earl Jellicoe	George Jellicoe	20 Nov 1935	Con.	Baron Jellicoe of Southampton
The Earl of Snowdon	Antony Armstrong-Jones	6 Oct 1961	XB.	Baron Armstrong-Jones
The Viscount Cranborne	Robert Gascoyne-Cecil	29 Apr 1992	Con.	Baron Gascoyne-Cecil
The Lord Carrington	Peter Carington	19 Nov 1938	Con.	Baron Carington of Upton
The Lord Windlesham	David Hennessy	20 Feb 1963	Con.	Baron Hennessy
The Lord Belstead	John Ganzoni	18 Dec 1958	Con.	Baron Ganzoni
The Lord Shepherd	Malcolm Shepherd	4 Dec 1954	Lab.	Baron Shepherd of Spalding
The Lord Aldington	Toby Low	29 Jan 1962	Con.	Baron Low
The Lord Erroll of Hale	Frederick Erroll	19 Dec 1964	Con.	Baron Erroll of Kilmun

Excluded Hereditary peers who already held life peerages before commencement of the House of Lords Act 1999
Title	Name	Date created	Aff.	Life peerage
The Earl of Crawford and Balcarres	Robert Lindsay	24 Jan 1975	Con.	Baron Balniel (1975)
The Viscount Younger of Leckie	George Younger	7 Jul 1992	Con.	Baron Younger of Prestwick (1992)

== Other hereditary peers ==
=== Lord Great Chamberlain ===
Upon the passing of the House of Lords Act 1999, the following peer was an ex officio member of the House of Lords by virtue of his office as Lord Great Chamberlain. Upon the death of Queen Elizabeth II on 8 September 2022, the office changed hands, and the peer was excluded pursuant to the Act.

Key
Living peer as of 28 October 2026.

Hereditary peer initially excepted but subsequently excluded under the House of Lords Act 1999
Title	Name	Date succeeded	Introduction or Sat first in the Lords	Aff.	Ref.
The Marquess of Cholmondeley, DL	David Cholmondeley	13 Mar 1990	4 Jun 1990	XB.	

=== Earl Marshal ===
Upon the passing of the House of Lords Act 1999, the following peer was an ex officio member of the House of Lords by virtue of his office as Earl Marshal. Prior to becoming an ex officio member, Miles Fitzalan-Howard had first become Lord Beaumont after the death of his mother in 1971, and then also Lord Howard of Glossop in 1972 after the death of his father. Then he became both Duke of Norfolk and Earl Marshal on 31 January 1975.

Hereditary peer initially excepted under the House of Lords Act 1999
Title	Name	Date succeeded	Introduction or Sat first in the Lords	Aff.	Ref.
The Duke of Norfolk, KG, GCVO, CB, CBE, MC, DL	Miles Fitzalan-Howard	31 Jan 1975 (Note: Succeeded to the Barony of Beaumont on 31 August 1971.)	28 Oct 1971 (Note: As The Lord Beaumont.)	Con.	
The Duke of Norfolk, KG, GCVO, CB, CBE, MC, DL	Miles Fitzalan-Howard	31 Jan 1975	17 Apr 1975	Con.	

=== Disclaimed hereditary peers ===
The following 10 peers disclaimed their hereditary titles under the Peerage Act 1963, under which peers can disclaim their peerage for life. Even though they were not affected by the expulsion, three members returned to the House by virtue of their life peerages and remained members until their respective deaths and retirement. Despite the House of Lords Act 1999, the Barony of Silkin was disclaimed in 2002.

Disclaimed Hereditary peers at the time of the House of Lords Act 1999
Title	Name	Disclaimed by; life	Date succeeded	Date disclaimed	Life peerage
The Viscount Stansgate, PC, FRSA	Tony Benn	2nd Viscount; 1925–2014	17 Nov 1960	31 Jul 1963	
The Lord Altrincham, FRSL	John Grigg	2nd Baron; 1924–2001	1 Dec 1955	31 Jul 1963	
The Viscount Hailsham, KG, CH, PC, QC, FRS	Quintin Hogg (Note: Held the office of Lord Chancellor in 1970–1974 and 1979–1987.) (Note: Held the office of Lord President of the Council in 1957–1959 and 1960–1964.) (Note: Held the office of Lord Keeper of the Privy Seal in 1959–1960.)	2nd Viscount; 1907–2001	16 Aug 1950	20 Nov 1963	Baron Hailsham of St. Marylebone (1970) (Note: Introduced on 30 June 1970.)
The Earl of Durham	Antony Lambton	6th Earl; 1922–2006	4 Feb 1970	23 Feb 1970	
The Lord Sanderson of Ayot	Alan Sanderson	2nd Baron; 1931–2022	15 Aug 1971	28 Sep 1971	
The Lord Reith	Christopher Reith	2nd Baron; 1928–2016	16 Jun 1971	21 Apr 1972	
The Lord Silkin	Arthur Silkin	2nd Baron; 1916–2001	11 May 1972	18 May 1972	
The Lord Merthyr, CBE, JP, DL	Trevor Lewis	4th Baron; 1935–2015	16 Apr 1977	26 Apr 1977	
The Earl of Selkirk, PC, QC	Lord James Douglas-Hamilton (Note: Held the office of Lord High Commissioner to the General Assembly of the Church of Scotland in 2012–2013.)	11th Earl; 1942–2023	24 Nov 1994	1 Dec 1994	Baron Selkirk of Douglas (1997) (Note: Introduced on 28 October 1997.) (Note: Resigned from the House of Lords under the House of Lords Reform Act 2014 on 27 July 2023.)
The Viscount Camrose, MBE, TD	Michael Berry	3rd Viscount; 1911–2001	15 Feb 1995	14 Mar 1995	Baron Hartwell (1968) (Note: Introduced on 21 February 1968.)

=== Irish hereditary peers ===
The following 68 Peers of the Peerage of Ireland were not affected by the expulsion of the House of Lords Act 1999 as they were already on the electoral roll and were eligible to be a Member of Parliament and vote in elections in the United Kingdom.

Key
Living peer as of 28 October 2026.

Irish hereditary peers at the time of the House of Lords Act 1999
	Title	Name	Date succeeded
Earls in the Peerage of Ireland	The Earl of Westmeath	William Nugent	20 Nov 1971
Earls in the Peerage of Ireland	The Earl of Cavan	Roger Lambart	17 Nov 1988
Earls in the Peerage of Ireland	The Earl of Mexborough	John Savile	15 May 1980
Earls in the Peerage of Ireland	The Earl Winterton	Donald Turnour	2 Jun 1991
Earls in the Peerage of Ireland	The Earl of Kingston	Barclay King-Tenison	17 Jul 1948
Earls in the Peerage of Ireland	The Earl of Roden	Robert Jocelyn	18 Oct 1993
Earls in the Peerage of Ireland	The Earl of Lisburne, DL	John Vaughan	30 Jun 1965
Earls in the Peerage of Ireland	The Earl of Antrim, FRSA	Alexander McDonnell	26 Sep 1977
Earls in the Peerage of Ireland	The Earl of Portarlington	George Dawson-Damer	4 Jul 1959
Earls in the Peerage of Ireland	The Earl of Mayo	Terence Bourke	19 Dec 1962
Earls in the Peerage of Ireland	The Earl Annesley	Patrick Annesley	21 Feb 1979
Earls in the Peerage of Ireland	The Earl Belmore	John Lowry-Corry	20 Jul 1960
Earls in the Peerage of Ireland	The Earl Castle Stewart	Patrick Stuart	5 Nov 1961
Earls in the Peerage of Ireland	The Earl of Caledon, JP	Nicholas Alexander (Note: Held the office of Lord Lieutenant of Armagh at the time of the Act as of 2025.)	20 May 1980
Earls in the Peerage of Ireland	The Earl of Rosse	Brendan Parsons	5 Jul 1979
Earls in the Peerage of Ireland	The Earl of Dunraven and Mount-Earl	Thady Wyndham-Quin	28 Aug 1965
Earls in the Peerage of Ireland	The Earl of Kilmorey, PC	Richard Needham	12 Apr 1977
Earls in the Peerage of Ireland	The Earl of Norbury	Noel Graham-Toler	24 May 1955
Viscounts in the Peerage of Ireland	The Viscount Valentia	Richard Annesley	16 Mar 1983
Viscounts in the Peerage of Ireland	The Viscount Dillon	Henry Dillon	15 Sep 1982
Viscounts in the Peerage of Ireland	The Viscount Charlemont	John Caulfeild	14 Sep 1985
Viscounts in the Peerage of Ireland	The Viscount Molesworth	Robert Molesworth	15 Oct 1997
Viscounts in the Peerage of Ireland	The Viscount Chetwynd	Adam Chetwynd	12 Jun 1965
Viscounts in the Peerage of Ireland	The Viscount Galway	George Monckton-Arundell	30 Jan 1980
Viscounts in the Peerage of Ireland	The Viscount Ashbrook, JP, DL	Michael Flower	5 Dec 1995
Viscounts in the Peerage of Ireland	The Viscount Southwell	Pyers Southwell	18 Nov 1960
Viscounts in the Peerage of Ireland	The Viscount de Vesci	Thomas Vesey	13 Oct 1983
Viscounts in the Peerage of Ireland	The Viscount Lifford	Edward Hewitt	6 Jan 1987
Viscounts in the Peerage of Ireland	The Viscount Bangor	William Ward	8 May 1993
Viscounts in the Peerage of Ireland	The Viscount Doneraile	Richard St Leger	22 Oct 1983
Viscounts in the Peerage of Ireland	The Viscount Harberton	Thomas Pomeroy	25 May 1980
Viscounts in the Peerage of Ireland	The Viscount Hawarden	Robert Maude	6 Sep 1991
Viscounts in the Peerage of Ireland	The Viscount Gort	Foley Vereker	6 Apr 1995
Barons in the Peerage of Ireland	The Lord Kingsale	John de Courcy	7 Nov 1969
Barons in the Peerage of Ireland	The Lord Dunsany	Edward Plunkett	6 Feb 1999
Barons in the Peerage of Ireland	The Lord Trimlestown	Raymond Barnewall	19 Aug 1997
Barons in the Peerage of Ireland	The Lord Dunboyne	Patrick Butler	9 May 1945
Barons in the Peerage of Ireland	The Lord Louth	Otway Plunkett	3 Feb 1950
Barons in the Peerage of Ireland	The Lord Inchiquin	Conor O'Brien	20 May 1982
Barons in the Peerage of Ireland	The Lord Carbery	Peter Evans-Freke	25 Dec 1970
Barons in the Peerage of Ireland	The Lord Aylmer	Michael Aylmer	6 Dec 1982
Barons in the Peerage of Ireland	The Lord Farnham	Barry Maxwell	5 Feb 1957
Barons in the Peerage of Ireland	The Lord Lisle	Patrick Lysaght	29 Dec 1997
Barons in the Peerage of Ireland	The Lord Newborough	Robert Wynn	11 Oct 1998
Barons in the Peerage of Ireland	The Lord Macdonald	Godfrey Macdonald	29 Nov 1970
Barons in the Peerage of Ireland	The Lord Massy	David Massy	5 Aug 1995
Barons in the Peerage of Ireland	The Lord Muskerry	Robert Deane	14 Oct 1988
Barons in the Peerage of Ireland	The Lord Kilmaine	John Browne	26 Jul 1978
Barons in the Peerage of Ireland	The Lord Waterpark	Frederick Cavendish	20 Nov 1948
Barons in the Peerage of Ireland	The Lord Graves	Evelyn Graves	6 Jun 1994
Barons in the Peerage of Ireland	The Lord Huntingfield	Joshua Vanneck	1 May 1994
Barons in the Peerage of Ireland	The Lord Hotham	Henry Hotham	18 Nov 1967
Barons in the Peerage of Ireland	The Lord Crofton	Guy Crofton	27 Jun 1989
Barons in the Peerage of Ireland	The Lord ffrench	Robuck ffrench	30 Jan 1986
Barons in the Peerage of Ireland	The Lord Langford, OBE, DL	Geoffrey Rowley-Conwy	19 Aug 1953
Barons in the Peerage of Ireland	The Lord Dufferin and Claneboye	John Blackwood	13 Nov 1991
Barons in the Peerage of Ireland	The Lord Ventry	Andrew Daubeney de Moleyns	7 Mar 1987
Barons in the Peerage of Ireland	The Lord Dunalley	Henry Prittie	26 Jun 1992
Barons in the Peerage of Ireland	The Lord Clanmorris	Simon Bingham	6 Aug 1988
Barons in the Peerage of Ireland	The Lord Ashtown, KCMG	Nigel Trench	27 Apr 1990
Barons in the Peerage of Ireland	The Lord Rendlesham	Charles Thellusson	9 Oct 1999
Barons in the Peerage of Ireland	The Lord Castlemaine, MBE	Roland Handcock	31 Jul 1973
Barons in the Peerage of Ireland	The Lord Decies	Marcus Beresford	7 Nov 1992
Barons in the Peerage of Ireland	The Lord Garvagh	Alexander Canning	16 Jul 1956
Barons in the Peerage of Ireland	The Lord Talbot of Malahide, DL	Reginald Arundell	20 Feb 1987
Barons in the Peerage of Ireland	The Lord Bellew	James Bellew	7 Sep 1981
Barons in the Peerage of Ireland	The Lord Fermoy	Maurice Roche	19 Aug 1984
Barons in the Peerage of Ireland	The Lord Rathdonnell	Thomas McClintock-Bunbury	13 Oct 1959

== See also ==
- List of hereditary peers in the House of Lords by virtue of a life peerage
- List of hereditary peers elected under the House of Lords Act 1999
