= John Kershaw, 4th Baron Kershaw =

British hereditary peer (1936–2026)

The Right Honourable The Lord Kershaw

Member of the House of Lords
- Lord Temporal
- Hereditary peerage 23 February 1962 – 11 November 1999
- Preceded by: The 3rd Baron Kershaw
- Succeeded by: Seat abolished (Note: Under the House of Lords Act 1999.)

Personal details
- Born: Edward John Kershaw; 12 May 1936
- Died: 4 January 2026 (aged 89)

Edward John Kershaw, 4th Baron Kershaw (12 May 1936 – 4 January 2026) was a British hereditary peer. He was a member of the House of Lords from 1962 to 1999.

== Early life and career ==
Edward John Kershaw was born on 12 May 1936. He is the son of Edward Aubrey Kershaw, and his wife Katharine Dorothea Staines who was the daughter of Charles H. Staines. His grandfather, Fred Kershaw, was a politician in Labour Party.

Kershaw married to Rosalind Lilian Rutherford on 20 July 1963. They had three children: one son and two daughters. He died on 4 January 2026, at the age of 89.

Peerage of the United Kingdom
Preceded by Edward Aubrey Kershaw	Baron Kershaw; 1962–2026	Succeeded by John Kershaw
