= Baron Kershaw =

Barony in the Peerage of the United Kingdom

Baron Kershaw, of Prestwich in the County Palatine of Lancaster, is a title in the Peerage of the United Kingdom. It was created in 1947 for Fred Kershaw, who later served as a Lord-in-waiting in the Labour government of Clement Attlee. As of 2026 the title is held by his great-grandson, the fifth Baron, who succeeded his father in 2026. During the 1920s and 1930s Fred Kershaw was instrumental in drafting the rules which set up the system for National Insurance for those who suffered industrial injuries. This bill became law in the 1930s. He also brought a bill for the provision of free milk for nursing mothers. His National Insurance Bill then became the basis of the Beverage Report - the forerunner of the National Health Service. It is for this work in particular, as well as other fields, such as supporting Mary MAcArthur and her holiday homes for working women, that he was made a Peer by clement Attlee in 1947.

== Barons Kershaw (1947) ==
- Fred Kershaw, 1st Baron Kershaw (1881–1961)
- Herbert Kershaw, 2nd Baron Kershaw (1904–1961)
- Edward Aubrey Kershaw, 3rd Baron Kershaw (1906–1962)
- Edward John Kershaw, 4th Baron Kershaw (1936–2026)
- John Charles Edward Kershaw, 5th Baron Kershaw (born 1971)

The heir apparent is the present holder's son The Honourable Edward John George Kershaw (born 2001).
