= Fred Kershaw, 1st Baron Kershaw =

British Labour politician (1881–1961)

Fred Kershaw, 1st Baron Kershaw OBE (6 November 1881 – 5 February 1961), was a British Labour politician.

Kershaw was the son of John Joseph Kershaw of Prestwich, Lancashire. He was governor of Westminster Hospital, chairman of Gordon Hospital, vice-president of the Workers' Temperance League and a founding member of the Manor House Hospital. In 1931 he was appointed an Officer of the Order of the British Empire. On 20 January 1947 he was raised to the peerage as Baron Kershaw, of Prestwich in the County Palatine of Lancaster. He then served in the Labour government of Clement Attlee as a Lord-in-waiting (government whip in the House of Lords) from 1949 to 1951. He was also a Deputy Speaker of the House of Lords.

Lord Kershaw married Frances Edith, daughter of James Thomas Wigmore, in 1903. She died in 1960. Lord Kershaw survived her by a year and died in February 1961, aged 79. He was succeeded in the barony by his eldest son Herbert.

Peerage of the United Kingdom
New creation	Baron Kershaw; 1947–1961	Succeeded by Herbert Kershaw

== Sources ==
- Kidd, Charles, Williamson, David (editors). Debrett's Peerage and Baronetage (1990 edition). New York: St Martin's Press, 1990.
- Leigh Rayment's Peerage Pages
