= Attlee ministry =

Government of the United Kingdom from 1945 to 1951

Attlee ministries
- 1945–1950; 1950–1951
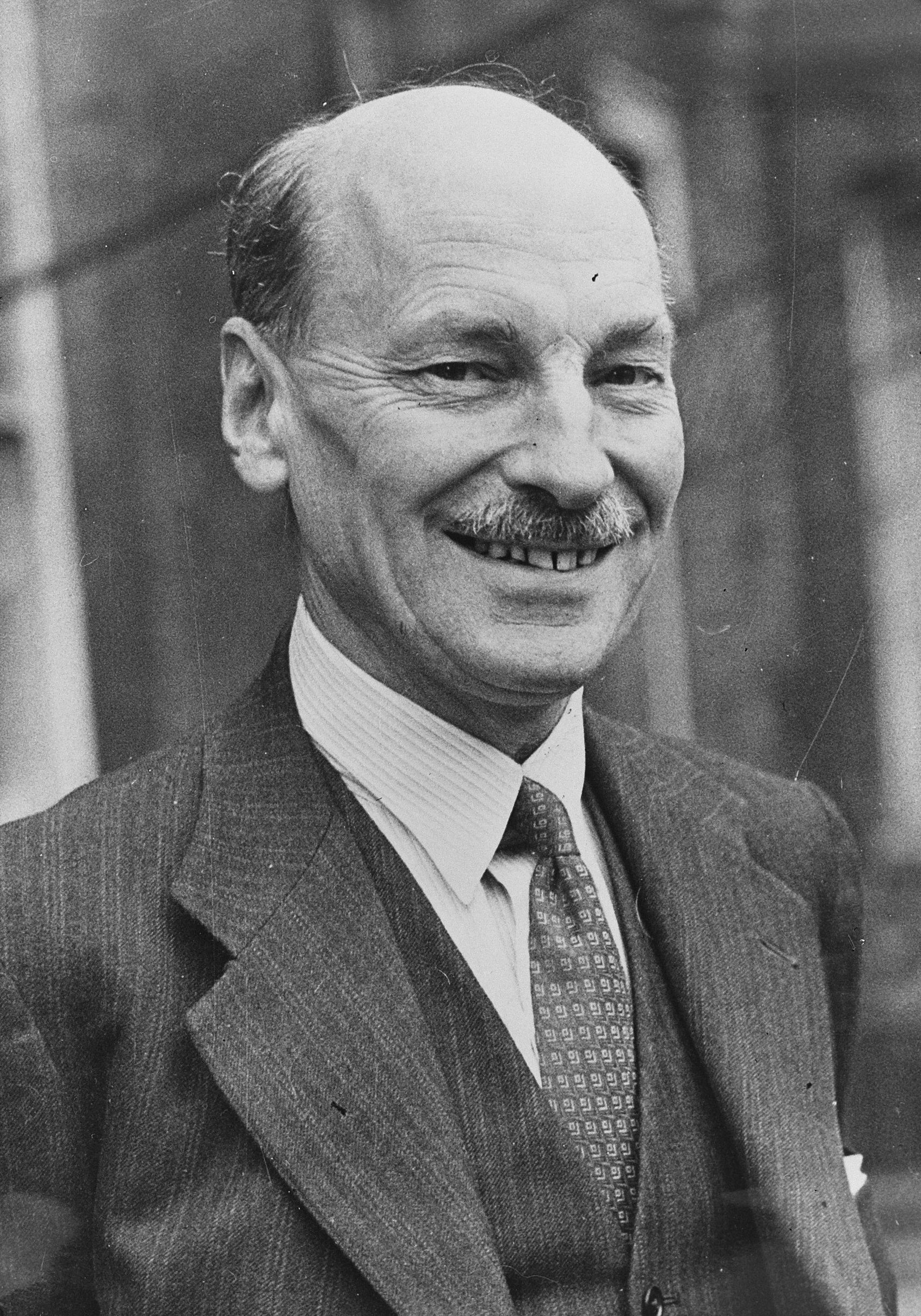
- Attlee (1950)
- Date formed: First: 26 July 1945; Second: 23 February 1950
- Date dissolved: First: 23 February 1950; Second: 26 October 1951

People and organisations
- Monarch: George VI
- Prime Minister: Clement Attlee
- Prime Minister's history: 1945–1951
- Deputy Prime Minister: Herbert Morrison
- Total no. of members: 243 appointments
- Member party: Labour Party
- Status in legislature: Majority
- Opposition party: Conservative Party
- Opposition leader: Winston Churchill

History
- Elections: 1945 general election; 1950 general election
- Outgoing election: 1951 general election
- Legislature terms: 1945–1950; 1950–1951
- Predecessor: Churchill caretaker ministry
- Successor: Third Churchill ministry

Clement Attlee was invited by King George VI to form the first Attlee ministry in the United Kingdom on 26 July 1945, succeeding Winston Churchill as Prime Minister of the United Kingdom. The Labour Party had won a landslide victory at the 1945 general election, and went on to enact policies of what became known as the post-war consensus, including the establishment of the welfare state and the nationalisation of 20 per cent of the entire economy. The government's spell in office was marked by post-war austerity measures; the crushing of pro-independence and communist movements in Malaya; the grant of independence to India, Pakistan, Ceylon, and Burma; the engagement in the Cold War against Soviet communism; and the creation of the country's National Health Service (NHS).

Attlee went on to win a narrow majority at the 1950 general election, forming the second Attlee ministry. Just twenty months after that election, Attlee called a new election for 25 October 1951, but was narrowly defeated by the Conservative Party, sending Labour into a 13-year spell in opposition.

== Leaders ==
The Labour Party came to power following its unexpected landslide victory in the July 1945 general election. Party leader Clement Attlee became prime minister replacing Winston Churchill in late July. Ernest Bevin was Foreign Secretary until shortly before his death in April 1951. Hugh Dalton became Chancellor of the Exchequer (though had to resign in 1947), while James Chuter Ede was Home Secretary.

Other notable figures in the government included: Herbert Morrison, Deputy Prime Minister and Leader of the House of Commons, who replaced Bevin as Foreign Secretary in March 1951; Sir Stafford Cripps was initially President of the Board of Trade but replaced Dalton as Chancellor of the Exchequer in 1947; Hugh Gaitskell held several minor posts before replacing Cripps as Chancellor in 1950; Aneurin Bevan was Minister of Health; Arthur Greenwood was Lord Privy Seal and Paymaster General while future Prime Minister Harold Wilson became the youngest member of the cabinet in the 20th century (at the age of 31) when he was made President of the Board of Trade in 1947. The most notable of the few female members of the government was Ellen Wilkinson, who was Minister of Education until her early death in 1947.

== Policies ==
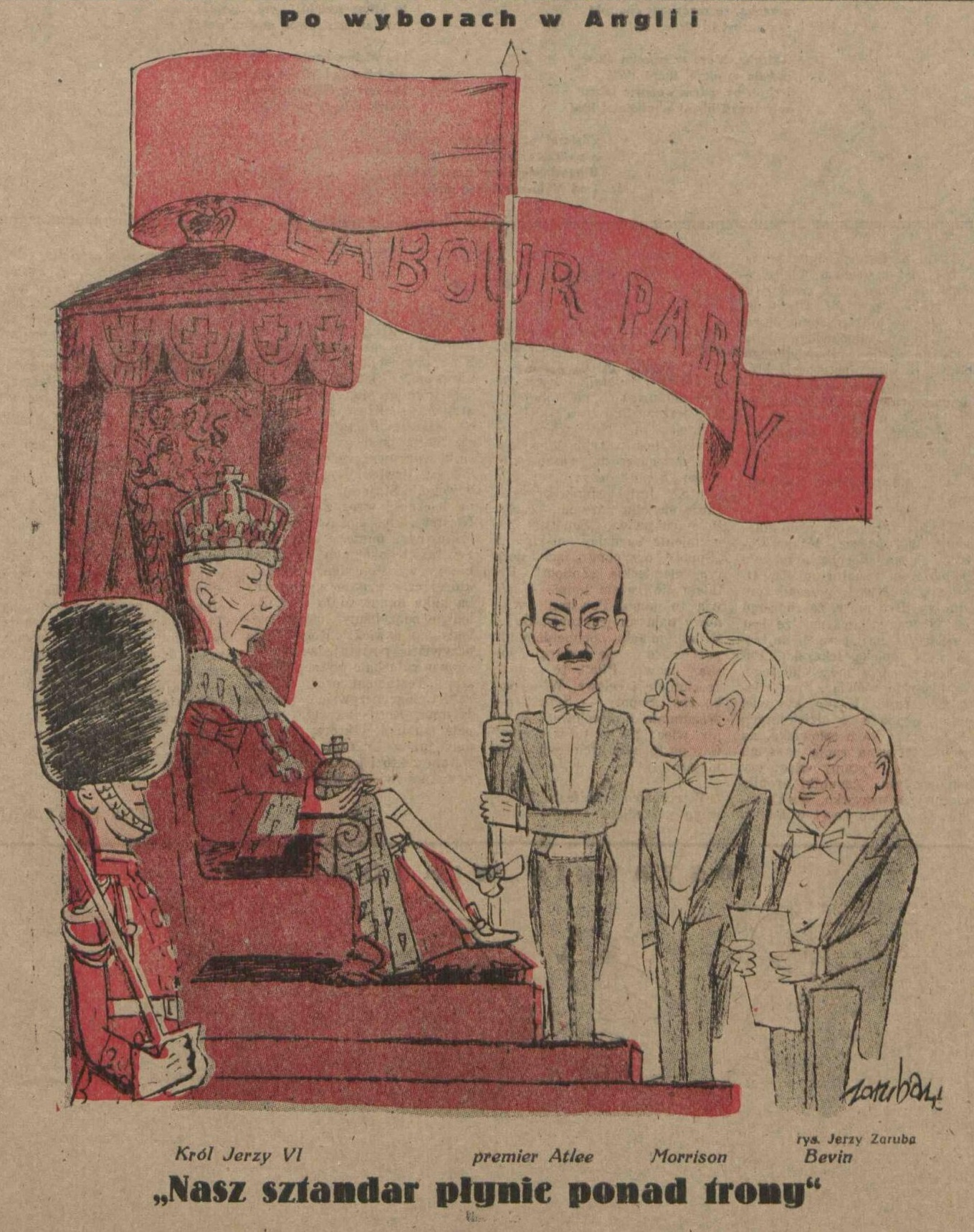
A contemporary cartoon in the Polish satirical magazine Szpilki critiquing the Attlee ministry

It was an "age of austerity", as wartime rationing was continued despite the Allied Forces' victory, and was even expanded upon to include bread. Living conditions were poor; instead of expansion, the country's task was to replace the national wealth destroyed or used up during the war. The Great Depression did not return, and full employment was created. Returning veterans were successfully reabsorbed into the postwar society. The Attlee government nationalised about 20% of the economy, including coal, railways, road transport, the Bank of England, civil aviation, electricity and gas, and steel. There was little money for investment to modernise these industries, and control was kept by the government, rather than passed to union members. The Attlee government greatly expanded the welfare state, with the National Health Service Act 1946, which nationalised the hospitals and provided for free universal healthcare. The National Insurance Act 1946 provided sickness and unemployment benefits for adults, plus retirement pensions.

The National Assistance scheme established under the National Assistance Act 1948 (11 & 12 Geo. 6. c. 29) provided for discretionary weekly additions to meet special circumstances like diets and laundry expenses, while at the discretion of the National Assistance Board 'Exceptional needs grants' (lump sum payments to meet expenditure arising from special categories of need) were also available. In addition, "Rent was treated as a separate item of requirement: householders would generally receive their net rent in full, whilst non-householders would receive a 'reasonable share' of the rent paid by the householder, subject to upper and lower limits." The National Assistance (Determination of Need) Regulations of 1948 laid down various entitlements to beneficiaries, such as a scale for blind and certain tuberculous patients and provision for applicants in local authority homes. A weekly sum in respect of requirements for rent was allowed, which in the regulations referred to "the weekly rent, or a proportion thereof, appropriate to a week, excluding arrears thereof, and the weekly proportion of outgoings borne by the householder including, in particular, rates, a reasonable allowance towards any necessary expenditure on repairs or insurance, and such portion as is for the time being attributable to interest of any sum payable in respect of a mortgage debt or heritable security charged on the house in which the householder resides, or on nay interest therein."

Various disregards were also made under the National Assistance Act 1948, including any death grant paid to a person under the provisions of section twenty-two of the National Insurance Act 1946, any maternity grant to which a woman is entitled under section fourteen of the National Insurance Act 1946, the first ten shillings and sixpence a week of any payment of sick pay received from a friendly society or trade union, the first ten shillings and sixpence a week "of any superannuation payment or superannuation payments in respect of previous service or employment from which the recipient has retired or resigned (whether payable by a former employer or not), not being a payment or payments— (i) on account of a pension under the Old Age Pensions Act, 1936 or under or by virtue of the Widows', Orphans' and Old Age Contributory Pensions Acts, 1936 to 1941, or under any enactment repealed by any of those Acts, or (ii) on account of a retirement pension under the National Insurance Act, 1946," any payment "in respect of retired pay or pension to which section sixteen of the [9 & 10 Geo. 5. c. 32.] Finance Act, 1919, applies, including any payment in respect of a dependants' allowance attached to such a pension," any payment "in respect of a disablement pension awarded under the [2 & 3 Geo. 6. c. 82.] Personal Injuries (Emergency Provisions) Act, 1939, including, an increase in such a pension in respect of dependants," any weekly payment "by way of compensation under any enactment relating to workmen's compensation," any payment "by way of disablement benefit under section twelve of the National Insurance (Industrial Injuries) Act, 1946."

More council housing was built, and plans were made through the New Towns Act 1946 (9 & 10 Geo. 6. c. 68) for the growth of suburbs, and to reduce overcrowding in major cities such as London and Glasgow. Since there was little money for detailed planning, the government adopted Keynesianism, which allowed for planning in the sense of overall control of the national deficit and surplus.

The Transport Act 1947 established the British Transport Commission, which took over control of the railways from the Big Four—Great Western Railway, London, Midland and Scottish Railway, London and North Eastern Railway and the Southern Railway—to form British Railways.

In foreign affairs, the government was active in the United Nations and negotiated a $5 billion loan from the United States and Canada in 1946. It eagerly joined the Marshall Plan in 1948. It could no longer afford to support the Greek government during the Greek Civil War and encouraged the U.S. to take its place through the Truman Doctrine in 1947. It took an active role in joining the United States in the Cold War and forming NATO. It gave independence to India, Pakistan, Ceylon and Burma and moved to strengthen the British Commonwealth.

=== Nationalisation projects ===
1945–51
The Labour Party comes to power with a programme for nationalising the essential sectors of the economy, some of which had been weakened during wartime: finance, heavy industry and natural resources, along with communication and transportation infrastructure.

1946
Coal industry under the National Coal Board.
Bank of England.
National Health Service created (with separate units in England, Wales, and Scotland and for Northern Ireland) taking over hospitals and making medical services free. NHS started operations in 1948.
1947
British Electricity Authority and area electricity boards.
Cable & Wireless.
1948
National rail, inland (not marine) water transport, some road haulage, some road passenger transport and Thomas Cook & Son under the British Transport Commission. Separate elements operated as British Railways, British Road Services, and British Waterways.
1949
Local authority gas supply undertakings in England, Scotland and Wales.
1951
Iron and Steel Corporation of Great Britain (privatised by the Conservative Government in 1955, and renationalised by Labour in 1967 as British Steel Corporation).

=== Social policies ===
==== Health ====
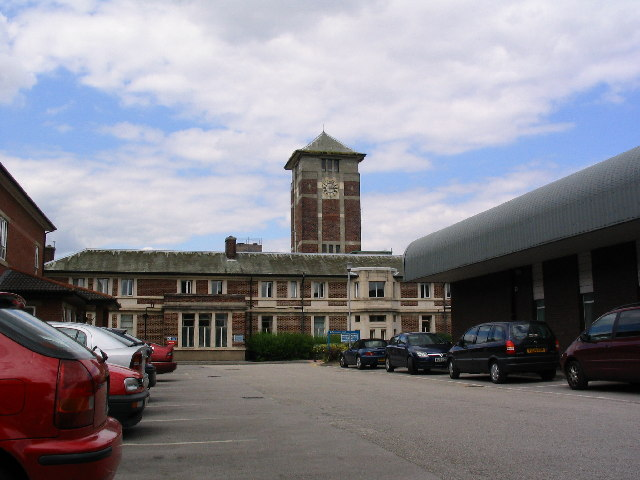
Trafford General Hospital, known as the birthplace of the NHS

Attlee's Health Minister, Aneurin Bevan, fought hard against the general disapproval of the medical establishment, including the British Medical Association, by creating the National Health Service in 1948. This was a publicly funded healthcare system, which offered treatment for all, regardless of income, free of charge at the point of use. Reflecting pent-up demand that had long existed for medical services, the NHS treated some 8,500,000 dental patients and dispensed more than 5,000,000 pairs of spectacles during its first year of operation.

Consultants benefited from the new system by being paid salaries that provided an acceptable standard of living without the need for them to resort to private practice. The NHS brought major improvements in the health of working-class people, with deaths from diphtheria, pneumonia, and tuberculosis significantly reduced. Although there were often disputes about its organisation and funding, British political parties continued to voice their general support for the NHS in order to remain electable.

In the field of health care, funds were allocated to modernisation and extension schemes aimed at improving administrative efficiency. Improvements were made in nursing accommodation in order to recruit more nurses and reduce labour shortages which were keeping 60,000 beds out of use, and efforts were made to reduce the imbalance "between an excess of fever and tuberculosis (TB) beds and a shortage of maternity beds".

BCG vaccinations were introduced for the protection of medical students, midwives, nurses, and contacts of patients with tuberculosis, a pension scheme was set up for employees of the newly established NHS, The National Health Service (Superannuation) Regulations 1947 laid down a number of provisions for beneficiaries including an officer's pension and retiring allowance, an injury allowance, a short service gratuity, a death gratuity, a widow's pension, and supplementary payments in the case of special classes of officers. Provision was also made for the allocation of part of pension or injury allowance to spouse of dependent.

The Radioactive Substances Act 1948 set out general provisions to control radioactive substances. Numerous lesser reforms were also introduced, some of which were of great benefit to certain segments of British society, such as the mentally deficient and the blind. Between 1948 and 1951, Attlee's government increased spending on health from £6,000,000,000 to £11,000,000,000: an increase of over 80%, and from 2.1% to 3.6% of GDP.

==== Welfare ====
The government set about implementing the wartime Beveridge Report plans for the creation of a 'cradle to grave' welfare state, and set in place an entirely new system of social security. Among the most important pieces of legislation was the National Insurance Act 1946, in which people in work paid a flat rate of national insurance. In return, they (and the wives of male contributors) were eligible for flat-rate pensions, sickness benefit, unemployment benefit, and funeral benefit. Various provisions were included in the National Insurance Act 1946 including unemployment and sickness benefit, maternity grant and attendance allowance, maternity allowance, widow's benefit, widow's pensions in special cases, guardian's allowance, retirement pension, and death grant. The National Insurance Act 1951, as noted by one study, “introduced an allowance payable with widows' benefits for each dependent child in the family.”

Various other pieces of legislation provided for child benefit and support for people with no other source of income. In 1949, unemployment, sickness and maternity benefits were exempted from taxation.

A block grant introduced in 1948 helped the social services provided by local authorities. Personal Social Services or welfare services were developed in 1948 for individual and families in general, particularly special groups such as the mentally disordered, deprived children, the elderly, and the handicapped.

The Attlee government increased pensions and other benefits, with pensions raised to become more of a living income than they had ever been. War pensions and allowances (for both World Wars) were increased by an act of 1946 which gave the wounded man with an allowance for his wife and children if he married after he had been wounded, thereby removing a grievance of more than twenty years standing. Other improvements were made in war pensions during Attlee's tenure as prime minister. A Constant Attendance Allowance was tripled, an Unemployability Allowance was tripled from 10s to 30s a week, and a special hardship allowance of up to £1 a week was introduced. In addition, the 1951 Budget made further improvements in the supplementary allowances for many war pensioners. From 1945 onwards, three out of every four pension claims had been successful, whilst after the First World War only one pension claim in three was allowed. In December 1946, regulations were made to establish extended out-of-work benefit in districts where (as noted by one study) “awkward pockets of unemployment occurred.” This concession, as one stud has noted, “relieved those who had exhausted their standard benefit from applying to the Assistance Board for further help.” Under the Superannuation (Miscellaneous Provisions) Act 1948, employees of a body representative of local authorities or of the officers of local authorities could be admitted "on suitable terms to the superannuation fund of a local authority". The Superannuation (Allocation of Pension) Rules, 1950 allowed civil servants to allocate parts of their pensions to secure pensions for their wives if they died before they did. In 1951, a comforts allowance was introduced that was automatically paid to war pensioners "receiving unemployability supplement and constant attendance allowance".

Various improvements were also made in financial levels of support for war pensioners and their dependents. In terms of allowances for wives and children, a requirement whereby marriage must have taken place with ten years of discharge was brought to an end in January 1947, which resulted in allowances being granted to tens of thousands of women and children who had not benefited by previous improvements in 1945 relating to post-injury marriage. A disablement pensioner of various wars in receipt of standard rate pensions also became eligible (as noted by one study) “for the first time for wife’s and children’s allowances.” The coverage of the constant attendance allowance was extended while the schedule of assessments for disablement was improved, with an increase in the assessment for amputation through the shoulder joint or hip joint from 80% to 90%, while the assessment for the loss of the left and or arm was increased (as noted by one study) “to the same level as that for the loss of the right arm or hand.” In terms of orphan’s pensions, the supplementary benefits that total orphans in the care of foster-parents were eligible for (which included pocket money, clothing grants, and holiday and medical expenses) were extended to total orphans cared for by relatives.

The Personal injuries (Civilians) Scheme of 1947 included various benefits such as an exceptional maximum rate of constant attendance allowance of 40s a week, and an allowance for wear and tear of clothing caused by the use of artificial limbs and appliances. In addition, allowances payable while a pensioner underwent inpatient treatment "are normally no longer subject to a deduction in respect of decreased home expenditure." Various changes were also made in respect of gainfully employed persons and civil defence volunteers who sustained war injuries. These included the provision of allowances for the wife and children for injured persons receiving injury allowance or disablement pension, amendments to the provisions for an allowance to a pensioner deemed unemployable by reason of his pensioned disablement "to secure that he receives in the aggregate by way of unemployability allowance and any social service benefits for which he is eligible at least 20s. a week in addition to his pension," increases in the allowance payable for a wife of a person receiving treatment allowance, unemployability allowance or injury allowance under certain conditions and "if no allowance is payable for a wife, an allowance may be granted for a dependant adult," and a social hardship allowance for partially disabled men "who, though not unemployable, is prevented by his pensioned disablement from resuming his former occupation or taking up one of equivalent standard." Also, "Where a man dies as the direct result of a qualifying injury his widow may be awarded a pension (with allowances for his children) without regard to the date of marriage."

A more extensive system of social welfare benefits had been established by the Attlee government, which did much to reduce acute social deprivation. The cumulative impact of the Attlee's government's health and welfare policies was such that all the indices of health (such as statistics of school medical or dental officers, or of medical officers of health) showed signs of improvement, with continual improvements in survival rates for infants and increased life expectancy for the elderly. The success of the Attlee Government's welfare legislation in reducing poverty was such that, in the general election of 1950, according to one study, "Labour propaganda could make much of the claim that social security had eradicated the most abject destitution of the 1930s".

==== Education ====
The Attlee government ensured provisions of the Education Act 1944 were fully implemented, with free secondary education becoming a right for the first time. Fees in state grammar schools were eliminated, while new, modern secondary schools were constructed.

The school leaving age was raised to 15 in 1947, an accomplishment helped brought into fruition by initiatives such as the HORSA ("Huts Operation for Raising the School-leaving Age") scheme and the S.F.O.R.S.A. (furniture) scheme. University scholarships were introduced to ensure that no one who was qualified "should be deprived of a university education for financial reasons", while a large school building programme was organised. A rapid increase in the number of trained teachers took place, and the number of new school places was increased. Under the Education Act 1946 and the Education (Miscellaneous Provisions) Act 1948, local authorities were empowered to provide clothing to pupils.

Increased Treasury funds were made available for education, particularly for upgrading school buildings suffering from years of neglect and war damage. Prefabricated classrooms were built, and 928 new primary schools were constructed between 1945 and 1950. The provision of free school meals was expanded, and opportunities for university entrants were increased. State scholarships to universities were increased, and the government adopted a policy of supplementing university scholarships awards to a level sufficient to cover fees plus maintenance.

Many thousands of ex-servicemen were assisted to go through college who could never have contemplated it before the war. Free milk was also made available to all schoolchildren for the first time. In addition, spending on technical education rose, and the number of nursery schools was increased. Salaries for teachers were also improved, and funds were allocated towards improving existing schools.

In 1947, the Arts Council of Great Britain was set up to encourage the arts.

The Ministry of Education was established under the 1944 Act, and free County Colleges were set up for the compulsory part-time instruction of teenagers between the ages of 15 and 18 who were not in full-time education. An Emergency Training Scheme was also introduced which turned out an extra 25,000 teachers in 1945–1951. In 1946-47, the number of State Scholarships awarded by the Ministry of Education each year was more than doubled while an existing upper limit of £100 per year plus tuition fees was abolished. In addition the holders of 1,200 to 1,500 open scholarships and open exhibitions awarded by university colleges, colleges of universities and universities became entitled (as noted by one study) “to claim supplementary financial assistance from the Ministry of Education up to the full costs of their University education on the same basis as State scholars.” Two new classes of State scholarships were also established. In 1947, Regional Advisory Councils were set up to bring together industry and education to find out the needs of young workers "and advise on the provision required, and to secure reasonable economy of provision". That same year, thirteen Area Training Organisations were set up in England and one in Wales to coordinate teacher training.

Attlee's government, however, failed to introduce the comprehensive education for which many socialists had hoped. This reform was eventually carried out by Harold Wilson's government. During its time in office, the Attlee government increased spending on education by over 50 per cent, from £6.5 billion to £10 billion.

==== Housing and planning ====
The New Towns Act 1946 (9 & 10 Geo. 6. c. 68) set up development corporations to construct new towns, while the Town and Country Planning Act 1947 instructed county councils to prepare development plans and also provided compulsory purchase powers. The Attlee government also extended the powers of local authorities to requisition houses and parts of houses, and made the acquisition of land less difficult than before. The Housing (Scotland) Act 1949 provided grants of 75% (87.5% in the Highlands and Islands) towards modernisation costs payable by the Treasury to local authorities.

In 1949, local authorities were empowered to provide people suffering from poor health with public housing at subsidised rents.

To assist home ownership, the limit on the amount of money that people could borrow from their local authority in order to purchase or build a home was raised from £800 to £1,500 in 1945, and to £5,000 in 1949. Under the National Assistance Act 1948 (11 & 12 Geo. 6. c. 29), local authorities had a duty "to provide emergency temporary accommodation for families which become homeless through no fault of their own".

A large house-building programme was carried out with the intention of providing millions of people with high-quality homes. A Housing act increased Treasury subsidies for the construction of local authority housing in England and Wales. Four out of five houses constructed under Labour were council properties built to more generous specifications than before the Second World War, and subsidies kept down council rents. Altogether, these policies provided public-sector housing with its biggest ever boost up until that point, while low-wage earners particularly benefited from these developments. Although the Attlee Government failed to meet its targets, primarily due to economic constraints, over 1,000,000 new homes were built between 1945 and 1951 (a significant achievement under the circumstances) which ensured that decent, affordable housing was available to many low-income families for the first time ever.

Development rights were nationalised while the government attempted to take all development profits for the state. Strong planning authorities were set up to control land use, and issued manuals of guidance which stressed the importance of safeguarding agricultural land. A strong chain of regional offices was set up within its planning ministry to provide a strong lead in regional development policies. Comprehensive Development Areas (CDAs), a designation under the Town and Country Planning Act 1947, allowed local authorities to acquire property in the designated areas using powers of compulsory purchase in order to re-plan and develop urban areas suffering from urban blight or war damage.

==== Women and children ====
A number of reforms were embarked upon to improve conditions for women and children. In 1946, universal family allowances were introduced to provide financial support to households for raising children. These benefits had been legislated for the previous year by Churchill's Family Allowances Act 1945. The Conservatives would later criticise Labour for having been "too hasty" in introducing family allowances.

The Married Women (Restraint Upon Anticipation) Act 1949 was passed in order to "to equalise, to render inoperative any restrictions upon anticipation or alienation attached to the enjoyment of property by a woman", while the Married Women (Maintenance) Act 1949 was enacted with the intention of improving the adequacy and duration of financial benefits for married women.

The Criminal Law (Amendment) Act 1950 amended the Criminal Law Amendment Act 1885 to bring prostitutes within the law and safeguard them from abduction and abuse. The Criminal Justice Act 1948 restricted imprisonment for juveniles and brought improvements to the probation and remand centre systems, while the passage of the Justices of the Peace Act 1949 led to extensive reforms of magistrates courts. The Attlee government also abolished the marriage bar in the Civil Service, thereby enabling married women to work in that institution.

In 1946, the government set up a National Institute of Houseworkers as a means of providing a socially democratic variety of domestic service.

By late 1946, agreed standards of training were established, which was followed by the opening of a training headquarters and the opening of an additional nine training centres in Wales, Scotland, and then nationwide throughout Great Britain. The National Health Service Act 1946 indicated that domestic help should be provided for households where that help is required "owing to the presence of any person who is ill, lying-in, an expectant mother, mentally defective, aged or a child not over compulsory school age". 'Home help' therefore included the provision of home-helps for nursing and expectant mothers and for mothers with children under the age of five, and by 1952 some 20,000 women were engaged in this service.

==== Workers' rights ====
Various measures were carried out to improve conditions in the workplace. Entitlement to sick leave was greatly extended, and sick pay schemes were introduced for local authority administrative, professional and technical workers in 1946 and for various categories of manual workers in 1948. Workers' compensation was also significantly improved. A National Insurance (Industrial Injuries) Act 1946 was introduced that included various provisions like injury benefit, disablement benefit, increases of disablement pension in cases of unemployability, special hardship, constant attendance, and during approval hospital treatment, and increases of injury benefit and disablement pension in respect of children and adult dependents. Under the National Insurance (Industrial Injuries) (Prescribed Diseases) Amendment Regulations of 1948, beneficiaries in receipt of disablement pensions for byssinosis were entitled in certain situations for pension increases in respect of special hardship, while disablement benefit in respect of pneumoconiosis was extended to more cases.

The Fair Wages Resolution of 1946 required any contractor working on a public project to at least match the pay rates and other employment conditions set in the appropriate collective agreement. In 1946, Purchase Tax was removed completely from kitchen fittings and crockery, while the rate was reduced on various gardening items. The Employment and Training Act 1948 included provisions such as provisions as to training for employment as well as payments towards the cost of removing and resettling workers

The Fire Services Act 1947 introduced a new pension scheme for firefighters, while the Electricity Act 1947 introduced better retirement benefits for workers in that industry. The Workers' Compensation (Supplementation) Act 1948 and introduced benefits for workers with certain asbestos-related diseases which had occurred before 1948. The Merchant Shipping Act 1948 and the Merchant Shipping (Safety Convention) Act 1949 were passed to improve conditions for seamen. The Shops Act 1950 consolidated previous legislation which provided that no one could be employed in a shop for more than six hours without having a break for at least 20 minutes. The legislation also required a lunch break of at least 45 minutes for anyone for worked between 11:30am and 2:30pm, and a half-hour tea break for anyone working between 4pm and 7pm. The government also strengthened a Fair Wages Resolution, with a clause that required all employers getting government contracts to recognise the rights of their workers to join trade unions.

The Trades Disputes Act 1927 was repealed, and a Dock Labour Scheme was introduced in 1947 to put an end to the casual system of hiring labour in the docks. This scheme gave registered dockers the legal right to minimum work and decent conditions. Through the National Dock Labour Board (on which trade unions and employers had equal representation) the unions acquired control over recruitment and dismissal. Registered dockers laid off by employers within the Scheme had the right either to be taken on by another, or to generous compensation. All dockers were registered under the Dock Labour Scheme, giving them a legal right to minimum work, holidays and sick pay.

Wages for members of the police force were significantly increased. The introduction of a Miner's Charter in 1946 instituted a five-day work week for miners and a standardised day wage structure, and in 1948 a Colliery Workers Supplementary Scheme was approved, providing supplementary allowances to disabled coal-workers and their dependants. Various benefits were provided under the scheme, including a supplementary injury benefit, a disablement pension in respect of a colliery accident or colliery disease, death benefits, and Supplementary allowances.

In 1948, a pension scheme was set up to provide pension benefits for employees of the new NHS, as well as their dependents. Under the Coal Industry Nationalisation (Superannuation) Regulations 1950, a pension scheme for mineworkers was established. Improvements were also made in farmworkers' wages, and the Agricultural Wages Board in 1948 not only safeguarded wage levels, but also ensured that workers were provided with accommodation.

A number of regulations aimed at safeguarding the health and safety of people at work were also introduced during Attlee's time in office. Regulations were issued in February 1946 applying to factories involved with "manufacturing briquettes or blocks of fuel consisting of coal, coal dust, coke or slurry with pitch as a binding .substance," and which concerned "dust and ventilation, washing facilities and clothing accommodation, medical supervision and examination, skin and eye protection and messrooms". The Coal Mines (Ventilation) General Regulations dated 17 May 1947 "implement recommendations of the Royal Commission on Safety in Coal Mines regarding two main topics: methods of checking periodically the general standard of ventilation and methods of minimising leakage of air. Provisions are laid down respecting determinations of firedamp content and methods by which these determinations are to be made." The Radioactive Substances Act, dated 30 June 1948, " which regulates the importation, manufacture, sale, storage and use of radioactive substances, includes provisions empowering the appropriate Minister to issue regulations for the prevention of injuries to health caused by ionising radiations and for securing the safe disposal of radioactive waste products." The Dry Cleaning Special Regulations, 1949 dated 29 November 1949 sought "to prohibit the use of liquids with a flash point below 32°C. (90°F.) from being used for dry cleaning otherwise than by spotting." The Blasting (Castings and Other Articles) Special Regulations 1949, "prohibit sandblasting and deal with the blasting enclosure, the cleaning of used abrasive, ventilation plant, inspection, examination and maintenance of equipment, personal protective equipment and clothing, the cleaning of blasting equipment, the employment of young persons, and the reporting of defects in the equipment. Sandblasting is prohibited in Section 5, which reads: "No sand or other substance containing free silica shall be introduced as an abrasive into any blasting apparatus." The Chief Inspector is empowered to grant exemptions from the regulations." UK: The matters dealt with by the Jute (Safety, Health and Welfare) Regulations dated 21 July 1948 "include the lifting and carrying of loads by women and young persons, ventilation, temperature and humidity, welfare, construction and use of machinery and sale and hire of machinery".

The Magnesium (Grinding of Castings and Other Articles) (Special Regulations) Order of December 1946 contained special measures "respecting the maintenance of plant and apparatus; precautions against causing sparks; the interception and removal of dust; automatic operation of appliances; protective clothing; and prohibition of smoking, open lights and fires". For those workers engaged in luminising processes, the Factories (Luminising) Special Regulations (1947) prohibited the employment of those under the age of 18 and ordered "an initial medical examination to be carried out before the seventh day of employment; subsequent examinations are to be carried out once a month".Under the terms of the Blasting (Castings and Other Articles) Special Regulations (1949) "no sand or other substance containing free silica is to be employed in any blasting process", while the Foundries (Parting Materials) Special Regulations (1950) prohibited the use of certain parting powders "which give rise to a substantial risk of silicosis".

The Building (Safety, Health & Welfare) Regulations 1948 required that measures should be taken to minimise exposure to potentially harmful dust or fumes, while the Pottery (Health) Special Regulations (1947) prohibited the use "except in the manufacture of glazed tiles" of all "but leadless or low solubility glazes and prescribe certain processes in which ground or powdered flint or quartz are not to be employed". The Pottery (Health and Welfare) Special Regulations 1950 made provision for the health and safety of workers employed in factories "in which there is carried on the manufacture or decoration of pottery or certain allied manufactures or processes".

==== Law ====
Various law reforms were also carried out by Attlee's government. The Criminal Justice Act 1948 provided for new methods to deal with offenders, and abolished hard labour, penal servitude, prison divisions and whipping. The Law Reform (Personal Injuries) Act 1948 enabled employees to sue their employers in cases where they experienced injury due to the negligence of a fellow employee. The Legal Aid and Advice Act 1949 introduced a state aided scheme to assist those who couldn't afford legal services. The Witnesses Allowances Regulations 1948 provided for the payment of a professional witness allowance, a night allowance, and an expert witness allowance in certain cases.

=== Post-war consensus ===
Most historians argue that the main domestic policies (except nationalisation of steel) reflected a broad bipartisan consensus. The post-war consensus is a historians' model of political agreement from 1945 to the late-1970s. In 1979 newly elected Prime Minister Margaret Thatcher rejected and reversed it. The concept claims there was a widespread consensus that covered support for coherent package of policies that were developed in the 1930s, promised during the Second World War, and enacted under Attlee. The policies dealt with a mixed economy, Keynesianism, and a broad welfare state. In recent years the validity of the interpretation has been debated by historians.

The historians' model of the post-war consensus was most fully developed by Paul Addison. The basic argument is that in the 1930s, Liberal Party intellectuals led by John Maynard Keynes and William Beveridge developed a series of plans that became especially attractive as the wartime government promised a much better post-war Britain and saw the need to engage every sector of society. The coalition government during the war, headed by Churchill and Attlee, signed off on a series of white papers that promised Britain a much improved welfare state. After the war, the promises included the National Health Service, and expansion of education, housing, and a number of welfare programmes. It did not include the nationalisation of iron and steel, which was approved only by the Labour Party.

The model states that from 1945 until the arrival of Thatcher in 1979, there was a broad multi-partisan national consensus on social and economic policy, especially regarding the welfare state, nationalised health services, educational reform, a mixed economy, government regulation, Keynesian macroeconomic policies, and full employment. Apart from the question of nationalisation of some industries, these policies were broadly accepted by the three major parties, as well as by industry, the financial community and the labour movement. Until the 1980s, historians generally agreed on the existence and importance of the consensus. Some historians such as Ralph Miliband expressed disappointment that the consensus was a modest or even conservative package that blocked a fully socialized society. Historian Angus Calder complained bitterly that the post-war reforms were an inadequate reward for the wartime sacrifices, and a cynical betrayal of the people's hope for a more just post-war society. In recent years, there has been a historiographical debate on whether such a consensus ever existed.

== Fate ==
In the February 1950 general election, the Labour Party narrowly maintained their majority by just 5 seats. This was insufficient to govern however, due to the Bevanite split causing tensions in the party. Another general election was called in 1951 to try and increase their majority. However, in the October 1951 general elections the Conservatives returned to power under Winston Churchill. Labour was to remain out of office for the next thirteen years, until 1964, when Harold Wilson became prime minister.

== Cabinets ==
=== First Attlee ministry ===
==== 1945–1950 ====
- Clement Attlee: Prime Minister and Minister of Defence
- Herbert Morrison: Deputy Prime Minister, Lord President of the Council and Leader of the House of Commons
- William Jowitt, 1st Viscount Jowitt: Lord High Chancellor of Great Britain
- Arthur Greenwood: Lord Keeper of the Privy Seal
- Hugh Dalton: Chancellor of the Exchequer
- Ernest Bevin: Secretary of State for Foreign Affairs
- James Chuter Ede: Secretary of State for the Home Department
- George Hall: Secretary of State for the Colonies
- Christopher Addison, 1st Viscount Addison: Secretary of State for Dominion Affairs and Leader of the House of Lords
- Frederick Pethick-Lawrence, 1st Baron Pethick-Lawrence: Secretary of State for India and Burma
- A. V. Alexander: First Lord of the Admiralty
- Jack Lawson: Secretary of State for War
- William Wedgwood Benn, 1st Viscount Stansgate: Secretary of State for Air
- Ellen Wilkinson: Minister of Education
- Joseph Westwood: Secretary of State for Scotland
- Tom Williams: Minister of Agriculture and Fisheries
- George Isaacs: Minister of Labour and National Service
- Aneurin Bevan: Minister of Health
- Sir Stafford Cripps: President of the Board of Trade
- Emanuel Shinwell: Minister of Fuel and Power

===== Changes =====
- July 1946 – Arthur Greenwood becomes Paymaster General as well as Lord Privy Seal.
- October 1946 – The three service ministers (Secretary of State for War, Secretary of State for Air, and First Lord of the Admiralty) cease to be cabinet positions. A. V. Alexander remains in the cabinet as Minister without Portfolio. George Hall replaces A. V. Alexander as First Lord of the Admiralty, outside the cabinet. Arthur Creech Jones succeeds Hall as Secretary of State for the Colonies.
- December 1946 – A. V. Alexander succeeds Attlee as Minister of Defence.
- February 1947 – George Tomlinson succeeds Ellen Wilkinson as Minister of Education upon her death.
- March 1947 – Arthur Greenwood ceases to be Paymaster General, remaining Lord Privy Seal. His successor as Paymaster General is not in the cabinet.
- April 1947 – Arthur Greenwood becomes Minister without Portfolio. Lord Inman succeeds Arthur Greenwood as Lord Privy Seal. William Francis Hare, Lord Listowel succeeds Lord Pethick-Lawrence as Secretary of State for India and Burma.
- July 1947 – The Dominion Affairs Office becomes the Office of Commonwealth Relations. Lord Addison remains at the head.
- August 1947 – The India and Burma Office becomes the Burma Office with India's independence. Lord Listowel remains in office. Responsibility for relations with India and Pakistan themselves are transferred to Addison and the Commonwealth Relations Office.
- September 1947 – Sir Stafford Cripps becomes Minister of Economic Affairs. Harold Wilson succeeds Cripps as President of the Board of Trade. Arthur Greenwood retires from the Front Bench.
- October 1947 – Lord Addison succeeds Lord Inman as Lord Privy Seal, remaining also Leader of the House of Lords. Philip Noel-Baker succeeds Lord Addison as Secretary of State for Commonwealth Relations. Arthur Woodburn succeeds Joseph Westwood as Secretary of State for Scotland. The Minister of Fuel and Power, Emanuel Shinwell, leaves the Cabinet.
- November 1947 – Sir Stafford Cripps succeeds Hugh Dalton as Chancellor of the Exchequer.
- January 1948 – The Burma Office is abolished with Burma's independence.
- May 1948 – Hugh Dalton re-enters the Cabinet as Chancellor of the Duchy of Lancaster. Lord Pakenham enters the Cabinet as Minister of Civil Aviation.
- July 1948 – Lord Addison becomes Paymaster General.
- April 1949 – Lord Addison ceases to be Paymaster General, remaining Lord Privy Seal and Leader of the House of Lords. His successor as Paymaster General is not in the Cabinet.

=== Second Attlee ministry ===
==== 1950–1951 ====
- Clement Attlee: Prime Minister
- Herbert Morrison: Deputy Prime Minister, Lord President of the Council and Leader of the House of Commons
- William Jowitt, 1st Viscount Jowitt: Lord High Chancellor of Great Britain
- Christopher Addison, 1st Viscount Addison: Leader of the House of Lords and Lord Keeper of the Privy Seal
- Sir Stafford Cripps: Chancellor of the Exchequer
- Ernest Bevin: Secretary of State for Foreign Affairs
- James Chuter Ede: Secretary of State for the Home Department
- Jim Griffiths: Secretary of State for the Colonies
- Patrick Gordon Walker: Secretary of State for Commonwealth Relations
- Harold Wilson: President of the Board of Trade
- A. V. Alexander, 1st Viscount Alexander of Hillsborough: Chancellor of the Duchy of Lancaster
- George Tomlinson: Minister of Education
- Hector McNeil: Secretary of State for Scotland
- Tom Williams: Minister of Agriculture and Fisheries
- George Isaacs: Minister of Labour and National Service
- Aneurin Bevan: Minister of Health
- Emanuel Shinwell: Minister of Defence
- Hugh Dalton: Minister of Town and Country Planning

===== Changes =====
- October 1950: Hugh Gaitskell succeeds Sir Stafford Cripps as Chancellor of the Exchequer.
- January 1951: Aneurin Bevan succeeds George Isaacs as Minister of Labour and National service. Bevan's successor as Minister of Health is not in the cabinet. Hugh Dalton's post is renamed Minister of Local Government and Planning.
- March 1951: Herbert Morrison succeeds Ernest Bevin as Foreign Secretary. Lord Addison succeeds Morrison as Lord President. Bevin succeeds Addison as Lord Privy Seal. James Chuter Ede succeeds Morrison as Leader of the House of Commons whilst remaining Home Secretary.
- April 1951: Richard Stokes succeeds Ernest Bevin (deceased) as Lord Privy Seal. Alf Robens succeeds Aneurin Bevan (resigned) as Minister of Labour and National Service. Sir Hartley Shawcross succeeds Harold Wilson (resigned) as President of the Board of Trade.

== List of ministers ==
Members of the Cabinet are in bold face.

Office	Name	Dates	Notes
Prime Minister and First Lord of the Treasury	**Clement Attlee**	26 July 1945 – 26 October 1951	
Lord High Chancellor of Great Britain	**William Jowitt, 1st Viscount Jowitt**	27 July 1945	
Lord President of the Council	**Herbert Morrison**	27 July 1945	also Leader of the House of Commons
Lord President of the Council	**Christopher Addison, 1st Viscount Addison**	9 March 1951	also Leader of the House of Lords
Lord Keeper of the Privy Seal	**Arthur Greenwood**	27 July 1945	
Lord Keeper of the Privy Seal	**Philip Inman, 1st Baron Inman**	17 April 1947	
Lord Keeper of the Privy Seal	**Christopher Addison, 1st Viscount Addison**	7 October 1947	also Leader of the House of Lords
Lord Keeper of the Privy Seal	**Ernest Bevin**	9 March 1951	
Lord Keeper of the Privy Seal	**Richard Stokes**	26 April 1951	Also Minister of Materials from 6 July 1951
Chancellor of the Exchequer	**Hugh Dalton**	27 July 1945	
Chancellor of the Exchequer	**Sir Stafford Cripps**	13 November 1947	
Chancellor of the Exchequer	**Hugh Gaitskell**	19 October 1950	
Minister of Economic Affairs	**Sir Stafford Cripps**	29 September 1947	New office. Combined with Chancellor of the Exchequer November 1947
Minister of Economic Affairs	Hugh Gaitskell	28 February 1950 – 19 October 1950	
Parliamentary Secretary to the Treasury	William Whiteley	3 August 1945	
Financial Secretary to the Treasury	Glenvil Hall	4 August 1945	
Financial Secretary to the Treasury	Douglas Jay	2 March 1950	
Economic Secretary to the Treasury	Douglas Jay	5 December 1947	Office vacant 2 March 1950
Economic Secretary to the Treasury	John Edwards	19 October 1950	
Lords of the Treasury	Robert Taylor	4 August 1945 – 26 October 1951	
Lords of the Treasury	Joseph Henderson	4 August 1945 – 1 January 1950	
Lords of the Treasury	Michael Stewart	10 August 1945 – 30 March 1946	
Lords of the Treasury	Arthur Blenkinsop	10 August 1945 – 10 May 1946	
Lords of the Treasury	Frank Collindridge	10 August 1945 – 9 December 1946	
Lords of the Treasury	Charles Simmons	30 March 1946 – 1 February 1949	
Lords of the Treasury	William Hannan	10 May 1946 – 26 October 1951	
Lords of the Treasury	Julian Snow	9 December 1946 – 3 March 1950	
Lords of the Treasury	Richard Adams	1 February 1949 – 23 April 1950	
Lords of the Treasury	William Wilkins	1 January 1950 – 26 October 1951	
Lords of the Treasury	Herbert Bowden	3 March 1950 – 26 October 1951	
Lords of the Treasury	Charles Royle	23 April 1950 – 26 October 1951	
Secretary of State for Foreign Affairs	**Ernest Bevin**	27 July 1945	
Secretary of State for Foreign Affairs	**Herbert Morrison**	9 March 1951	
Minister of State for Foreign Affairs	Philip Noel-Baker	3 August 1945	
Minister of State for Foreign Affairs	Hector McNeil	4 October 1946	
Minister of State for Foreign Affairs	Kenneth Younger	28 February 1950	
Parliamentary Under-Secretary of State for Foreign Affairs	Hector McNeil	4 August 1945 – 4 October 1946	
Parliamentary Under-Secretary of State for Foreign Affairs	Christopher Mayhew	4 October 1946 – 2 March 1950	
Parliamentary Under-Secretary of State for Foreign Affairs	William Henderson, 1st Baron Henderson	7 June 1948 – 26 October 1951	
Parliamentary Under-Secretary of State for Foreign Affairs	Ernest Davies	2 March 1950 – 26 October 1951	
Secretary of State for the Home Department	**James Chuter Ede**	3 August 1945	also Leader of the House of Commons 1951
Under-Secretary of State for the Home Department	George Oliver	4 August 1945	
Under-Secretary of State for the Home Department	Kenneth Younger	7 October 1947	
Under-Secretary of State for the Home Department	Geoffrey de Freitas	2 March 1950	
First Lord of the Admiralty	**A. V. Alexander**	3 August 1945	
First Lord of the Admiralty	George Hall	4 October 1946	Not in cabinet
First Lord of the Admiralty	Frank Pakenham, 1st Baron Pakenham	24 May 1951	
Parliamentary and Financial Secretary to the Admiralty	John Dugdale	4 August 1945	
Parliamentary and Financial Secretary to the Admiralty	James Callaghan	2 March 1950	
Civil Lord of the Admiralty	Walter James Edwards	4 August 1945	
Minister of Agriculture and Fisheries	**Tom Williams**	3 August 1945	
Parliamentary Secretary to the Ministry of Agriculture and Fisheries	Francis Hastings, 16th Earl of Huntingdon	4 August 1945 – 22 November 1950	
Parliamentary Secretary to the Ministry of Agriculture and Fisheries	Percy Collick	5 September 1945 – 7 October 1947	
Parliamentary Secretary to the Ministry of Agriculture and Fisheries	George Brown	7 October 1947 – 26 April 1951	
Parliamentary Secretary to the Ministry of Agriculture and Fisheries	William Francis Hare, 5th Earl of Listowel	22 November 1950 – 26 October 1951	
Parliamentary Secretary to the Ministry of Agriculture and Fisheries	Arthur Champion	26 April 1951 – 26 October 1951	
Secretary of State for Air	**William Wedgwood Benn, 1st Viscount Stansgate**	3 August 1945	
Secretary of State for Air	Philip Noel-Baker	4 October 1946	Not in Cabinet
Secretary of State for Air	Arthur Henderson	7 October 1947	
Under-Secretary of State for Air	John Strachey	4 August 1945	
Under-Secretary of State for Air	Geoffrey de Freitas	27 May 1946	
Under-Secretary of State for Air	Aidan Crawley	2 March 1950	
Minister of Aircraft Production	John Wilmot	4 August 1945	Office abolished 1 April 1946
Parliamentary Secretary to the Ministry of Aircraft Production	Arthur Woodburn	4 August 1945	
Minister of Civil Aviation	Reginald Fletcher, 1st Baron Winster	4 August 1945	
Minister of Civil Aviation	The Lord Nathan	4 October 1946	
Minister of Civil Aviation	**Frank Pakenham, 1st Baron Pakenham**	31 May 1948	Office in Cabinet until 28 February 1950
Minister of Civil Aviation	David Rees-Williams, 1st Baron Ogmore	1 June 1951	
Parliamentary Secretary to the Ministry of Civil Aviation	Ivor Thomas	10 August 1945	
Parliamentary Secretary to the Ministry of Civil Aviation	George Lindgren	4 October 1946	
Parliamentary Secretary to the Ministry of Civil Aviation	Frank Beswick	2 March 1950	
Secretary of State for the Colonies	**George Hall**	3 August 1945	
Secretary of State for the Colonies	**Arthur Creech Jones**	4 October 1946	
Secretary of State for the Colonies	**James Griffiths**	28 February 1950	
Minister of State for the Colonies	William Francis Hare, 5th Earl of Listowel	4 January 1948	
Minister of State for the Colonies	John Dugdale	28 February 1950	
Under-Secretary of State for the Colonies	Arthur Creech Jones	4 August 1945	
Under-Secretary of State for the Colonies	Ivor Thomas	4 October 1946	
Under-Secretary of State for the Colonies	David Rees-Williams	7 October 1947	
Under-Secretary of State for the Colonies	Thomas Fotheringham Cook	2 March 1950	
Secretary of State for Commonwealth Relations	**Christopher Addison, 1st Viscount Addison**	7 July 1947	also Leader of the House of Lords
Secretary of State for Commonwealth Relations	**Philip Noel-Baker**	7 October 1947	
Secretary of State for Commonwealth Relations	**Patrick Gordon Walker**	28 February 1950	
Minister of State for Commonwealth Relations	Arthur Henderson	14 August 1947 – 7 October 1947	
Under-Secretary of State for Commonwealth Relations	Arthur Bottomley	7 July 1947	
Under-Secretary of State for Commonwealth Relations	Patrick Gordon Walker	7 October 1947	
Under-Secretary of State for Commonwealth Relations	Angus Holden, 3rd Baron Holden	2 March 1950	
Under-Secretary of State for Commonwealth Relations	David Rees-Williams	4 July 1950	Lord Ogmore from 5 July
Under-Secretary of State for Commonwealth Relations	George Bingham, 6th Earl of Lucan	1 July 1951	
Minister of Defence	**Clement Attlee**	27 July 1945	Also Prime Minister
Minister of Defence	**A. V. Alexander**	20 December 1946	
Minister of Defence	**Emanuel Shinwell**	28 February 1950	
Secretary of State for Dominion Affairs	**Christopher Addison, 1st Viscount Addison**	3 August 1945	also Leader of the House of Lords; became Secretary of State for Commonwealth Relations 7 July 1947
Under-Secretary of State for Dominion Affairs	John Parker	4 August 1945	
Under-Secretary of State for Dominion Affairs	Arthur Bottomley	10 May 1946	
Minister of Education	**Ellen Wilkinson**	3 August 1945	
Minister of Education	**George Tomlinson**	10 February 1947	
Parliamentary Secretary to the Ministry of Education	Arthur Jenkins	4 August 1945	
Parliamentary Secretary to the Ministry of Education	David Hardman	30 October 1945	
Minister of Food	Sir Ben Smith	3 August 1945	
Minister of Food	John Strachey	27 May 1946	
Minister of Food	Maurice Webb	28 February 1950	
Parliamentary Secretary to the Ministry of Food	Edith Summerskill	4 August 1945	
Parliamentary Secretary to the Ministry of Food	Stanley Evans	2 March 1950	
Parliamentary Secretary to the Ministry of Food	Fred Willey	18 April 1950	
Minister of Fuel and Power	**Emanuel Shinwell**	3 August 1945	
Minister of Fuel and Power	Hugh Gaitskell	7 October 1947	Office no longer in Cabinet
Minister of Fuel and Power	Philip Noel-Baker	28 February 1950	
Parliamentary Secretary to the Ministry of Fuel and Power	William Foster	4 August 1945	
Parliamentary Secretary to the Ministry of Fuel and Power	Hugh Gaitskell	10 May 1946	
Parliamentary Secretary to the Ministry of Fuel and Power	Alfred Robens	7 October 1947	
Parliamentary Secretary to the Ministry of Fuel and Power	Harold Neal	26 April 1951	
Minister of Health	**Aneurin Bevan**	3 August 1945	
Minister of Health	Hilary Marquand	17 January 1951	Office not in Cabinet
Parliamentary Secretary to the Ministry of Health	Charles Key	4 August 1945	
Parliamentary Secretary to the Ministry of Health	John Edwards	12 February 1947	
Parliamentary Secretary to the Ministry of Health	Arthur Blenkinsop	1 February 1949	
Secretary of State for India and Burma	**Frederick Pethick-Lawrence**	3 August 1945	
Secretary of State for India and Burma	**William Francis Hare, 5th Earl of Listowel**	17 April 1947	Offices abolished 14 August 1947 (India) and 4 January 1948 (Burma)
Under-Secretary of State for India and Burma	Arthur Henderson	4 August 1945 – 14 August 1947	
Minister of Information	Edward Williams	4 August 1945	
Minister of Information	William Francis Hare, 5th Earl of Listowel	26 February 1946	Office abolished 31 March 1946
Minister of Labour and National Service	**George Isaacs**	3 August 1945	
Minister of Labour and National Service	**Aneurin Bevan**	18 January 1951	
Minister of Labour and National Service	**Alfred Robens**	24 April 1951	
Parliamentary Secretary to the Ministry of Labour	Ness Edwards	4 August 1945	
Parliamentary Secretary to the Ministry of Labour	Fred Lee	2 March 1950	
Chancellor of the Duchy of Lancaster	John Hynd	4 August 1945	
Chancellor of the Duchy of Lancaster	Frank Pakenham, 1st Baron Pakenham	17 April 1947	
Chancellor of the Duchy of Lancaster	**Hugh Dalton**	31 May 1948	Office in Cabinet
Chancellor of the Duchy of Lancaster	**A. V. Alexander, 1st Viscount Alexander of Hillsborough**	28 February 1950	
Minister of National Insurance	James Griffiths	4 August 1945	
Minister of National Insurance	Edith Summerskill	28 February 1950	
Parliamentary Secretary to the Ministry of National Insurance	George Lindgren	4 August 1945	
Parliamentary Secretary to the Ministry of National Insurance	Tom Steele	4 October 1946	
Parliamentary Secretary to the Ministry of National Insurance	Bernard Taylor	2 March 1950	
Paymaster General	office vacant		
Paymaster General	**Arthur Greenwood**	9 July 1946	
Paymaster General	Hilary Marquand	5 March 1947	
Paymaster General	**Christopher Addison, 1st Viscount Addison**	2 July 1948	also Leader of the House of Lords
Paymaster General	Gordon Macdonald, 1st Baron Macdonald of Gwaenysgor	1 April 1949	
Minister without Portfolio	**A. V. Alexander**	4 October 1946 – 20 December 1946	
Minister without Portfolio	**Arthur Greenwood**	17 April 1947 – 29 September 1947	
Minister of Pensions	Wilfred Paling	3 August 1945	
Minister of Pensions	John Hynd	17 April 1947	
Minister of Pensions	George Buchanan	7 October 1947	
Minister of Pensions	Hilary Marquand	2 July 1948	
Minister of Pensions	George Isaacs	17 January 1951	
Parliamentary Secretary to the Ministry of Pensions	Jennie Adamson	4 August 1945	
Parliamentary Secretary to the Ministry of Pensions	Arthur Blenkinsop	10 May 1946	
Parliamentary Secretary to the Ministry of Pensions	Charles Simmons	1 February 1949	
Postmaster General	William Hare, 5th Earl of Listowel	4 August 1945	
Postmaster General	Wilfred Paling	17 April 1947	
Postmaster General	Ness Edwards	28 February 1950	
Assistant Postmaster General	Wilfrid Burke	10 August 1945	
Assistant Postmaster General	Charles Rider Hobson	7 October 1947	
Secretary of State for Scotland	**Joseph Westwood**	3 August 1945	
Secretary of State for Scotland	**Arthur Woodburn**	7 October 1947	
Secretary of State for Scotland	**Hector McNeil**	28 February 1950	
Under-Secretary of State for Scotland	George Buchanan	4 August 1945 – 7 October 1947	
Under-Secretary of State for Scotland	Tom Fraser	4 August 1945 – 26 October 1951	
Under-Secretary of State for Scotland	John James Robertson	7 October 1947 – 26 October 1951	
Under-Secretary of State for Scotland	Margaret Herbison	2 March 1950 – 26 October 1951	
Minister of Supply	John Wilmot	3 August 1945	
Minister of Supply	George Strauss	7 October 1947	
Parliamentary Secretary to the Ministry of Supply	William Leonard	4 August 1945 – 7 October 1947	
Parliamentary Secretary to the Ministry of Supply	Arthur Woodburn	1 April 1946 – 7 October 1947	
Parliamentary Secretary to the Ministry of Supply	John Freeman	7 October 1947 – 23 April 1951	
Parliamentary Secretary to the Ministry of Supply	John Henry Jones	7 October 1947 – 2 March 1950	
Parliamentary Secretary to the Ministry of Supply	Michael Stewart	2 May 1951 – 26 October 1951	
Minister of Town and Country Planning	Lewis Silkin	4 August 1945	
Minister of Town and Country Planning	**Hugh Dalton**	28 February 1950	Became Minister of Local Government and Planning 31 January 1951
Parliamentary Secretary to the Ministry of Town and Country Planning	Fred Marshall	10 August 1945	
Parliamentary Secretary to the Ministry of Town and Country Planning	Evelyn King	7 October 1947	
Parliamentary Secretary to the Ministry of Town and Country Planning	George Lindgren	2 March 1950	
President of the Board of Trade	**Sir Stafford Cripps**	27 July 1945	
President of the Board of Trade	**Harold Wilson**	29 September 1947	
President of the Board of Trade	**Sir Hartley Shawcross**	24 April 1951	
Parliamentary Secretary to the Board of Trade	Ellis Smith	4 August 1945	
Parliamentary Secretary to the Board of Trade	John Belcher	12 January 1946	
Parliamentary Secretary to the Board of Trade	John Edwards	1 February 1949	
Parliamentary Secretary to the Board of Trade	Hervey Rhodes	2 March 1950	
Secretary for Overseas Trade	Hilary Marquand	4 August 1945	
Secretary for Overseas Trade	Harold Wilson	5 March 1947	
Secretary for Overseas Trade	Arthur Bottomley	7 October 1947	
Minister of Transport	Alfred Barnes	3 August 1945	
Parliamentary Secretary to the Ministry of Transport	George Strauss	4 August 1945	
Parliamentary Secretary to the Ministry of Transport	James Callaghan	7 October 1947	
Parliamentary Secretary to the Ministry of Transport	George William Lucas, 1st Baron Lucas of Chilworth	2 March 1950	
Secretary of State for War	**Jack Lawson**	3 August 1945	
Secretary of State for War	Frederick Bellenger	4 October 1946	
Secretary of State for War	Emanuel Shinwell	7 October 1947	
Secretary of State for War	John Strachey	28 February 1950	
Under-Secretary of State for War	Harry Nathan, 1st Baron Nathan	4 August 1945	
Under-Secretary of State for War	Frank Pakenham, 1st Baron Pakenham	4 October 1946 – 17 April 1947	Office combined with Financial Secretary
Financial Secretary to the War Office	Frederick Bellenger	4 August 1945	
Financial Secretary to the War Office	John Freeman	4 October 1946	Under-Secretary role incorporated 17 April 1947
Financial Secretary to the War Office	Michael Stewart	7 October 1947	
Financial Secretary to the War Office	Woodrow Wyatt	2 May 1951	
Minister of Works	George Tomlinson	4 August 1945	
Minister of Works	Charles Key	10 February 1947	
Minister of Works	Richard Stokes	28 February 1950	
Minister of Works	George Brown	26 April 1951	
Parliamentary Secretary to the Ministry of Works	Harold Wilson	4 August 1945	
Parliamentary Secretary to the Ministry of Works	Evan Durbin	5 March 1947	
Parliamentary Secretary to the Ministry of Works	Robert Morrison, 1st Baron Morrison	26 September 1948	
Attorney General	Sir Hartley Shawcross	4 August 1945	
Attorney General	Sir Frank Soskice	24 April 1951	
Solicitor General	Sir Frank Soskice	4 August 1945	
Solicitor General	Sir Lynn Ungoed-Thomas	24 April 1951	
Lord Advocate	George Reid Thomson	10 August 1945	
Lord Advocate	John Wheatley	7 October 1947	
Solicitor General for Scotland	Daniel Patterson Blades	10 September 1945	
Solicitor General for Scotland	John Wheatley	19 March 1947	
Solicitor General for Scotland	Douglas Johnston	24 October 1947	
Treasurer of the Household	George Mathers	4 August 1945	
Treasurer of the Household	Arthur Pearson	30 March 1946	
Comptroller of the Household	Arthur Pearson	4 August 1945	
Comptroller of the Household	Michael Stewart	30 March 1946	
Comptroller of the Household	Frank Collindridge	9 December 1946	
Vice-Chamberlain of the Household	Julian Snow	10 August 1945	
Vice-Chamberlain of the Household	Michael Stewart	9 December 1946	
Vice-Chamberlain of the Household	Ernest Popplewell	16 October 1947	
Captain of the Gentlemen-at-Arms	Charles George Ammon, 1st Baron Ammon	4 August 1945	
Captain of the Gentlemen-at-Arms	George Shepherd, 1st Baron Shepherd	18 October 1949	
Captain of the Yeomen of the Guard	Alexander Walkden, 1st Baron Walkden	4 August 1945	
Captain of the Yeomen of the Guard	George Shepherd, 1st Baron Shepherd	6 July 1949	
Captain of the Yeomen of the Guard	George Lucas, 1st Baron Lucas of Chilworth	18 October 1949	
Captain of the Yeomen of the Guard	George Bingham, 6th Earl of Lucan	5 March 1950	
Captain of the Yeomen of the Guard	George Archibald, 1st Baron Archibald	8 June 1951	
Lords in Waiting	William Westwood, 1st Baron Westwood	10 September 1945 – 17 January 1947	
Lords in Waiting	Frank Pakenham, 1st Baron Pakenham	14 October 1945 – 4 October 1946	
Lords in Waiting	William Henderson, 1st Baron Henderson	21 October 1945 – 7 June 1948	
Lords in Waiting	Robert Chorley, 1st Baron Chorley	11 October 1946 – 31 March 1950	
Lords in Waiting	Robert Morrison, 1st Baron Morrison	17 January 1947 – 26 September 1948	
Lords in Waiting	George Lucas, 1st Baron Lucas of Chilworth	9 July 1948 – 18 October 1949	
Lords in Waiting	George Shepherd, 1st Baron Shepherd	14 October 1948 – 6 July 1949	
Lords in Waiting	Fred Kershaw, 1st Baron Kershaw	6 July 1949 – 26 October 1951	
Lords in Waiting	John Davies, 1st Baron Darwen	18 October 1949 – 26 December 1950	
Lords in Waiting	Thomas Burden, 1st Baron Burden	31 March 1950 – 26 October 1951	
Lords in Waiting	Leslie Haden-Guest, 1st Baron Haden-Guest	13 February 1951 – 26 October 1951	

== Major legislation enacted ==
- Law Reform (Contributory Negligence) Act 1945
- Housing (Financial and Miscellaneous Provisions) Act 1946
- Coal Industry Nationalisation Act 1946
- Furnished Houses (Rent Control) Act 1946
- National Health Service Act 1946
- National Insurance Act 1946
- National Insurance (Industrial Injuries) Act 1946
- New Towns Act 1946
- Trade Disputes and Trade Unions Act 1946
- Hill Farming Act 1946
- Agriculture Act 1947
- Pensions (Increase) Act 1947
- Electricity Act 1947
- Town and Country Planning Act 1947
- Transport Act 1947
- National Assistance Act 1948
- Children Act 1948
- Factories Act 1948
- Education (Miscellaneous Provisions) Act 1948
- Agricultural Holdings Act 1948
- Employment and Training Act 1948
- Nurseries and Child-Minders Regulation Act 1948
- Law Reform (Personal Injuries) Act 1948
- Local Government Act 1948
- Representation of the People Act 1948
- Housing Act 1949
- Superannuation Act 1949
- House of Commons (Redistribution of Seats) Act 1949
- Landlord and Tenant (Rent Control) Act 1949
- Lands Tribunal Act 1949
- Legal Aid and Advice Act 1949
- Adoption of Children Act 1949
- Marriage Act 1949
- National Parks and Access to the Countryside Act 1949
- Parliament Act 1949
- Representation of the People Act 1949
- Distribution of Industry Act 1950
- Coal-Mining (Subsidence) Act 1950
- Allotments Act 1950
- Workmen's Compensation (Supplementation) Act 1951

== See also ==
- List of nationalizations by country#United Kingdom

== Sources ==
- Jefferys, Kevin (14 January 2014). The Attlee Governments 1945–1951. Routledge. ISBN 978-1-317-89894-8.

Preceded by Churchill caretaker ministry	Government of the United Kingdom; 1945–1951	Succeeded by Third Churchill ministry
