= Rural Party =

Rural Party may refer to:

- Eastern Rural Party, short-lived political party in Bolivia
- Finnish Rural Party
- Focus NZ, political party in New Zealand, formerly NZ Rural Party
- Rural Alliance Party, a political party in the Solomon Islands originally known as the Rural Party
- Rural Development Party in Papua New Guinea
- Rural Party (Iceland)
- Rural Party (UK), a former political party in the United Kingdom
- Rural Party (Slovakia), a nationalist party in Slovakia

== See also ==
- List of agrarian parties
