= List of acts of the Parliament of the United Kingdom from 1950 =

This is a complete list of acts of the Parliament of the United Kingdom for the year 1950.

Note that the first parliament of the United Kingdom was held in 1801; parliaments between 1707 and 1800 were either parliaments of Great Britain or of Ireland. For acts passed up until 1707, see the list of acts of the Parliament of England and the list of acts of the Parliament of Scotland. For acts passed from 1707 to 1800, see the list of acts of the Parliament of Great Britain. See also the list of acts of the Parliament of Ireland.

For acts of the devolved parliaments and assemblies in the United Kingdom, see the list of acts of the Scottish Parliament, the list of acts of the Northern Ireland Assembly, and the list of acts and measures of Senedd Cymru; see also the list of acts of the Parliament of Northern Ireland.

The number shown after each act's title is its chapter number. Acts passed before 1963 are cited using this number, preceded by the year(s) of the reign during which the relevant parliamentary session was held; thus the Union with Ireland Act 1800 is cited as "39 & 40 Geo. 3. c. 67", meaning the 67th act passed during the session that started in the 39th year of the reign of George III and which finished in the 40th year of that reign. Note that the modern convention is to use Arabic numerals in citations (thus "41 Geo. 3" rather than "41 Geo. III"). Acts of the last session of the Parliament of Great Britain and the first session of the Parliament of the United Kingdom are both cited as "41 Geo. 3". Acts passed from 1963 onwards are simply cited by calendar year and chapter number.

== 14 Geo. 6 ==
The first session of the 39th Parliament of the United Kingdom, which met from 1 March 1950 until 26 October 1950.

This session was also traditionally cited as 14 G. 6.

=== Public general acts ===
Short title	Citation	Royal assent
Long title
Consolidated Fund Act 1950 (repealed)	14 Geo. 6. c. 1	30 March 1950
An Act to apply certain sums out of the Consolidated Fund to the service of the years ending on the thirty-first day of March, one thousand nine hundred and forty-nine, one thousand nine hundred and fifty and one thousand nine hundred and fifty-one. (Repealed by Statute Law Revision Act 1964 (c. 79))
Post Office and Telegraph (Money) Act 1950 (repealed)	14 Geo. 6. c. 2	27 April 1950
An Act to provide for raising further money for the development of the postal, telegraphic and telephonic systems and the repayment to the Post Office Fund of money applied thereout for such development, to amend the enactments relating to Post Office accounts and for purposes connected therewith. (Repealed by Post Office Act 1961 (9 & 10 Eliz. 2. c. 15))
Army and Air Force (Annual) Act 1950 (repealed)	14 Geo. 6. c. 3	27 April 1950
An Act to provide, during twelve months, for the discipline and regulation of the Army and the Air Force, and to repeal certain enactments relating thereto. (Repealed by Statute Law Revision Act 1953 (2 & 3 Eliz. 2. c. 5) and Revision of the Army and Air Force Acts (Transitional Provisions) Act 1955 (3 & 4 Eliz. 2. c. 20))
High Court and County Court Judges Act 1950 (repealed)	14 Geo. 6. c. 4	23 May 1950
An Act to provide for increasing the number of puisne judges of the High Court and the number of judges of county courts. (Repealed by Administration of Justice (Judges and Pensions) Act 1960 (9 & 10 Eliz. 2. c. 3))
Newfoundland (Consequential Provisions) Act 1950 (repealed)	14 Geo. 6. c. 5	23 May 1950
An Act to provide for repeals and amendments of enactments consequential on Newfoundland's becoming part of Canada. (Repealed by British Nationality Act 1981 (c. 61))
Statute Law Revision Act 1950	14 Geo. 6. c. 6	23 May 1950
An Act for further promoting the Revision of the Statute Law by repealing Enactments which have ceased to be in force or have become unnecessary and for facilitating the publication of Revised Editions of the Statutes.
Diplomatic Privileges (Extension) Act 1950 (repealed)	14 Geo. 6. c. 7	23 May 1950
An Act to amend the Diplomatic Privileges (Extension) Act, 1944. (Note: Diplomatic Privileges (Extension) Act 1944 (7 & 8 Geo. 6. c. 44)) (Repealed by International Organisations (Immunities and Privileges) Act 1950 (14 Geo. 6. c. 14))
Distribution of Industry Act 1950 (repealed)	14 Geo. 6. c. 8	12 July 1950
An Act to make further provision for the acquisition of land, creation of easements and carrying out of work in development areas; to authorise the Board of Trade to make grants in exceptional cases in connection with the establishment in, or transfer to, development areas of industrial undertakings, and to make grants or loans to housing associations for the provision of dwellings in development areas; and to extend section five of the Employment and Training Act, 1948, (Note: Employment and Training Act 1948 (11 & 12 Geo. 6. c. 46)) in relation to persons transferred for employment in industrial undertakings established in, or transferred to, development areas. (Repealed by Local Employment Act 1960 (8 & 9 Eliz. 2. c. 18))
Merchant Shipping Act 1950	14 Geo. 6. c. 9	12 July 1950
An Act to provide for regulating crew accommodation in fishing boats and for amending the Merchant Shipping Acts, 1894 to 1949, with respect to the engagement and discharge of crews, the review of punishments imposed by naval courts, fishing boats engaged in the Newfoundland cod fisheries, and proceedings in summary courts in Northern Ireland; and for purposes connected with the matters aforesaid.
Royal Patriotic Fund Corporation Act 1950	14 Geo. 6. c. 10	12 July 1950
An Act to make further provision as respects the application of certain funds under the management of the Royal Patriotic Fund Corporation.
Public Registers and Records (Scotland) Act 1950	14 Geo. 6. c. 11	12 July 1950
An Act to amend the law of Scotland with regard to the signing of certificates of recording in the Register of Sasines.
Foreign Compensation Act 1950	14 Geo. 6. c. 12	12 July 1950
An Act to provide for the establishment of a Commission for the purpose of registering and determining claims to participate in compensation under agreements with foreign Governments and of distributing any compensation received under any such agreements, and for purposes connected with the matters aforesaid.
Midwives (Amendment) Act 1950 (repealed)	14 Geo. 6. c. 13	12 July 1950
An Act to amend the law relating to midwives. (Repealed by Midwives Act 1951 (14 & 15 Geo. 6. c. 53) and Midwives (Scotland) Act 1951 (14 & 15 Geo. 6. c. 54))
International Organisations (Immunities and Privileges) Act 1950 (repealed)	14 Geo. 6. c. 14	12 July 1950
An Act to consolidate the Diplomatic Privileges (Extension) Acts, 1944 to 1950. (Repealed by International Organisations Act 1968 (c. 48))
Finance Act 1950	14 Geo. 6. c. 15	28 July 1950
An Act to grant certain duties and alter other duties, to make certain amendments of the law relating to purchase tax, to amend the law relating to other branches of the public revenue or to the National Debt, and to make further provision in connection with Finance.
Appropriation Act 1950 (repealed)	14 Geo. 6. c. 16	28 July 1950
An Act to apply a sum out of the Consolidated Fund to the service of the year ending on the thirty-first day of March, one thousand nine hundred and fifty-one and to appropriate the supplies granted in this Session of Parliament. (Repealed by Statute Law Revision Act 1964 (c. 79))
Agriculture (Miscellaneous Provisions) Act 1950 (repealed)	14 Geo. 6. c. 17	28 July 1950
An Act to authorise the payment out of moneys provided by Parliament of grants in respect of petrol-driven machines used in connection with agriculture and of contributions towards costs of providing fertilisers used for agricultural land; and for purposes connected therewith. (Repealed by Statute Law (Repeals) Act 1986 (c. 12))
Cinematograph Film Production (Special Loans) Act 1950 (repealed)	14 Geo. 6. c. 18	28 July 1950
An Act to amend the Cinematograph Film Production (Special Loans) Act, 1949, (Note: Cinematograph Film Production (Special Loans) Act 1949 (12, 13 & 14 Geo. 6. c. 20)) as respects the permitted maximum aggregate amount of principal outstanding in respect of advances made by the Board of Trade to the National Film Finance Corporation. (Repealed for England and Wales and Scotland by Films Act 1970 (c. 26) and for Northern Ireland by National Film Finance Corporation Act 1981 (c. 15))
Isle of Man (Customs) Act 1950 (repealed)	14 Geo. 6. c. 19	28 July 1950
An Act to amend the law with respect to customs in the Isle of Man. (Repealed for the Isle of Man by Customs and Excise etc. Order 1976 (GC No 1/76))
Colonial and Other Territories (Divorce Jurisdiction) Act 1950 (repealed)	14 Geo. 6. c. 20	28 July 1950
An Act to make further provision as respects matrimonial proceedings in certain courts outside the United Kingdom in cases of parties to the marriage domiciled in England, Scotland or Northern Ireland. (Repealed by Family Law Act 1986 (c. 55))
Miscellaneous Financial Provisions Act 1950 (repealed)	14 Geo. 6. c. 21	28 July 1950
An Act to make further provision for a temporary increase in the Civil Contingencies Fund, to authorise loans to the Government of Northern Ireland, to give statutory authority for the payment out of moneys provided by Parliament of grants in respect of the expenses of police forces in England and Wales, and to wind up the Czecho-Slovak Financial Claims Fund. (Repealed by Statute Law (Repeals) Act 1986 (c. 12))
London Government Act 1950 (repealed)	14 Geo. 6. c. 22	28 July 1950
An Act to constitute the Minister of Health the sanctioning authority for all the purposes of Part VII of the London Government Act, 1939. (Note: London Government Act 1939 (2 & 3 Geo. 6. c. 40)) (Repealed by London Government Act 1963 (c. 33))
Coal-Mining (Subsidence) Act 1950 (repealed)	14 Geo. 6. c. 23	28 July 1950
An Act to provide for the carrying out of repairs and the making of payments in respect of damage affecting certain dwelling-houses and caused by subsidence resulting from the working and getting of coal and other minerals worked with coal, and for the execution of works to prevent or reduce such damage; and for purposes connected with the matters aforesaid. (Repealed by Statute Law (Repeals) Act 1973 (c. 39))
Highways (Provision of Cattle-Grids) Act 1950 (repealed)	14 Geo. 6. c. 24	28 July 1950
An Act to provide for cattle-grids in or in connection with highways, and for purposes connected therewith. (Repealed for Scotland by Roads (Scotland) Act 1984 (c. 54) and for England and Wales by Statute Law (Repeals) Act 1989 (c. 43))
Matrimonial Causes Act 1950 (repealed)	14 Geo. 6. c. 25	28 July 1950
An Act to consolidate certain enactments relating to matrimonial causes in the High Court in England and to declarations of legitimacy and of validity of marriage and of British nationality, with such corrections and improvements as may be authorised by the Consolidation of Enactments (Procedure) Act, 1949. (Note: Consolidation of Enactments (Procedure) Act 1949 (12, 13 & 14 Geo. 6. c. 33)) (Repealed by Matrimonial Causes Act 1965 (c. 72))
Adoption Act 1950 (repealed)	14 Geo. 6. c. 26	28 July 1950
An Act to consolidate the enactments relating to the adoption of children with such corrections and improvements as may be authorised under the Consolidation of Enactments (Procedure) Act, 1949. (Repealed by Adoption Act 1958 (7 & 8 Eliz. 2. c. 5))
Arbitration Act 1950	14 Geo. 6. c. 27	28 July 1950
An Act to consolidate the Arbitration Acts, 1889 to 1934. (Repealed for Scotland by Arbitration (Scotland) Act 2010 (asp 1))
Shops Act 1950 (repealed)	14 Geo. 6. c. 28	28 July 1950
An Act to consolidate the Shops Acts, 1912 to 1938, and certain other enactments relating to shops. (Repealed by Deregulation and Contracting Out Act 1994 (c. 40))
Medical Act 1950 (repealed)	14 Geo. 6. c. 29	28 July 1950
An Act to amend the Medical Acts, and for purposes connected therewith. (Repealed by Medical Act 1978 (c. 12))
National Service Act 1950 (repealed)	14 Geo. 6. c. 30	18 September 1950
An Act to substitute twenty-four months for eighteen months as the term of whole-time service under the National Service Act, 1948, (Note: National Service Act 1948 (11 & 12 Geo. 6. c. 64)) and for purposes connected therewith. (Repealed by Statute Law (Repeals) Act 1977 (c. 18))
Allotments Act 1950	14 Geo. 6. c. 31	26 October 1950
An Act to amend the law relating to allotments and to abolish restrictions on the keeping of hens and rabbits.
Army Reserve Act 1950 (repealed)	14 Geo. 6. c. 32	26 October 1950
An Act to consolidate certain enactments relating to the army reserve. (Repealed by Statute Law Revision Act 1953 (2 & 3 Eliz. 2. c. 5), Revision of the Army and Air Force Acts (Transitional Provisions) Act 1955 (3 & 4 Eliz. 2. c. 20), Mental Health (Scotland) Act 1960 (8 & 9 Eliz. 2. c. 61), South Africa Act 1962 (10 & 11 Eliz. 2. c. 23), Armed Forces Act 1971 (c. 33), Northern Ireland (Modification of Enactments—No. 1) Order 1973 (SI 1973/2163), Statute Law (Repeals) Act 1975 (c. 10), Statute Law (Repeals) Act 1977 (c. 18) and Reserve Forces Act 1980 (c. 9))
Air Force Reserve Act 1950 (repealed)	14 Geo. 6. c. 33	26 October 1950
An Act to consolidate certain enactments and Orders in Council relating to the air force reserve. (Repealed by Revision of the Army and Air Force Acts (Transitional Provisions) Act 1955 (3 & 4 Eliz. 2. c. 20), Mental Health (Scotland) Act 1960 (8 & 9 Eliz. 2. c. 61), South Africa Act 1962 (10 & 11 Eliz. 2. c. 23), Defence (Transfer of Functions) (No. 1) Order 1964 (SI 1964/488), Armed Forces Act 1971 (c. 33), Northern Ireland (Modification of Enactments—No. 1) Order 1973 (SI 1973/2163), Statute Law (Repeals) Act 1975 (c. 10), Statute Law (Repeals) Act 1976 (c. 16), Statute Law (Repeals) Act 1977 (c. 18) and Reserve Forces Act 1980 (c. 9))
Housing (Scotland) Act 1950 (repealed)	14 Geo. 6. c. 34	26 October 1950
An Act to consolidate the Housing (Scotland) Acts, 1925 to 1949, and certain other enactments relating to housing in Scotland. (Repealed by Housing (Scotland) Act 1987 (c. 26))
Food and Drugs (Milk, Dairies and Artificial Cream) Act 1950 (repealed)	14 Geo. 6. c. 35	26 October 1950
An Act to consolidate certain enactments relating to milk, dairies and artificial cream. (Repealed by Food and Drugs Act 1955 (4 & 5 Eliz. 2. c. 16))
Diseases of Animals Act 1950 (repealed)	14 Geo. 6. c. 36	26 October 1950
An Act to consolidate the Diseases of Animals Acts, 1894 to 1937, and certain other enactments relating to diseases of animals. (Repealed by Animal Health Act 1981 (c. 22))
Maintenance Orders Act 1950	14 Geo. 6. c. 37	26 October 1950
An Act to enable certain maintenance orders and other orders relating to married persons and children to be made and enforced throughout the United Kingdom.
Allotments (Scotland) Act 1950 (repealed)	14 Geo. 6. c. 38	26 October 1950
An Act to amend the law relating to allotments in Scotland. (Repealed by Community Empowerment (Scotland) Act 2015 (asp 6))
Public Utilities Street Works Act 1950 (repealed)	14 Geo. 6. c. 39	26 October 1950
An Act to enact uniform provisions for regulating relations as to apparatus in streets between authorities, bodies and persons having statutory powers to place and deal with apparatus therein, and those having the control or management of streets and others concerned in the exercise of such powers, to render such powers exercisable in land which abuts on a street and is destined for use for road purposes; to make further provision for regulating the closing or restriction of use of roads for the purposes of works and as to the use of alternative routes; and for purposes connected with the matters aforesaid. (Repealed by New Roads and Street Works Act 1991 (c. 22))

=== Local acts ===
Short title	Citation	Royal assent
Long title
Dundee Corporation (Administration and General Powers) Order Confirmation Act 1950 (repealed)	14 Geo. 6. c. i	27 April 1950
An Act to confirm a Provisional Order under the Private Legislation Procedure (Scotland) Act 1936 (Note: Private Legislation Procedure (Scotland) Act 1936 (26 Geo. 5 & 1 Edw. 8. c. 52)) relating to Dundee Corporation (Administration and General Powers). (Repealed by Dundee Corporation (Consolidated Powers) Order Confirmation Act 1957 (6 & 7 Eliz. 2. c. iv))
	Dundee Corporation (Administration and General Powers) Order 1950 Provisional Order to consolidate with amendments the Acts and Orders relating to and to confer further powers on the corporation of the city and royal burgh of Dundee with respect to general administration police lighting public parks observatory municipal buildings art galleries museums and libraries seashore and strand weights and measures street traffic and other cognate matters to enact provisions as to the levying of rates to authorise the said Corporation to borrow further moneys and for other purposes.	
St. John's Chapel Beverley Act 1950	14 Geo. 6. c. ii	23 May 1950
An Act to free Saint John's Chapel Beverley from the act or consequences of the consecration thereof and for other purposes.
Gun Barrel Proof Act 1950	14 Geo. 6. c. iii	23 May 1950
An Act to confer further powers upon the Master Wardens and Society of the Mystery of Gunmakers of the City of London and the Guardians of the Birmingham Proof House to amend the Gun Barrel Proof Act 1868 (Note: Gun Barrel Proof Act 1868 (31 & 32 Vict. c. cxiii)) and for other purposes.
Tees Conservancy Act 1950 (repealed)	14 Geo. 6. c. iv	23 May 1950
An Act to confer further powers upon the Tees Conservancy Commissioners with respect to rates tolls dues and charges. (Repealed by Tees and Hartlepools Port Authority Act 1966 (c. xxv))
City of London (Various Powers) Act 1950	14 Geo. 6. c. v	23 May 1950
An Act to make provision for payment of pensions to widows and orphan children of officers of the corporation of London to repeal enactments rendered unnecessary by reason of the extinguishment of tithes in the city of London and for other purposes.
German Potash Syndicate Loan Act 1950	14 Geo. 6. c. vi	23 May 1950
An Act to authorise and render binding arrangements for varying the rights and interests of the holders of bonds securing the loan known as "the Potash Syndicate of Germany 25-year Sinking Fund Gold Loan" to empower the Royal Exchange Assurance being the Trustees under the trust deeds constituting and securing the said loan to negotiate and become party to such arrangements and to take proceedings with respect thereto and for other purposes.
Aberdeen Harbour Order Confirmation Act 1950 (repealed)	14 Geo. 6. c. vii	12 July 1950
An Act to confirm a Provisional Order under the Private Legislation Procedure (Scotland) Act 1936 relating to Aberdeen Harbour. (Repealed by Aberdeen Harbour Order Confirmation Act 1960 (9 & 10 Eliz. 2. c. i))
	Aberdeen Harbour Order 1950 Provisional Order to make provision with regard to the rates leviable by the Aberdeen Harbour Commissioners to authorise the said Commissioners to borrow further moneys and for other purposes.	
Ministry of Health Provisional Order Confirmation (Colne Valley Sewerage Board) Act 1950	14 Geo. 6. c. viii	12 July 1950
An Act to confirm a Provisional Order of the Minister of Health relating to the Colne Valley Sewerage Board.
	Colne Valley Sewerage Order 1950 Provisional order altering a local Act. (Note: Hertfordshire County Council (Colne Valley Sewerage, &c.) Act 1937 (1 Edw. 8. & 1 Geo. 6. c. lxxxix))	
Ministry of Health Provisional Order Confirmation (South-West Middlesex Crematorium Board) Act 1950 (repealed)	14 Geo. 6. c. ix	12 July 1950
An Act to confirm a Provisional Order of the Minister of Health relating to the South-West Middlesex Crematorium Board. (Repealed by London Government Order 1965 (SI 1965/654))
	South-West Middlesex Crematorium Order 1950 Provisional order altering a local Act. (Note: South-West Middlesex Crematorium Act 1947 (10 & 11 Geo. 6. c. ix))	
Land Drainage (Surrey County Council (Hogsmill River Improvement) (Amendment)) Provisional Order Confirmation Act 1950	14 Geo. 6. c. x	12 July 1950
An Act to confirm a Provisional Order made by the Minister of Agriculture and Fisheries under the Surrey County Council Act 1936 (Note: Surrey County Council Act 1936 (26 Geo. 5 & 1 Edw. 8. c. cxxx)) to amend the Land Drainage (Surrey County Council (Hogsmill River Improvement)) Provisional Order Confirmation Act 1942. (Note: Land Drainage (Surrey County Council (Hogsmill River Improvement)) Provisional Order Confirmation Act 1942 (5 & 6 Geo. 6. c. iii))
	Surrey County Council (Hogsmill River Improvement) (Amendment) Order 1950 Provisional Order under the Surrey County Council Act 1936 to amend the Land Drainage (Surrey County Council (Hogsmill River Improvement)) Provisional Order Confirmation Act 1942.	
Wear Navigation and Sunderland Dock Act 1950 (repealed)	14 Geo. 6. c. xi	12 July 1950
An Act to make further provision with respect to the rates tolls duties dues sums and charges leviable respectively by the River Wear Commissioners and the Commissioners of the River Wear Watch to confer further powers upon the River Wear Commissioners and for other purposes. (Repealed by Sunderland Corporation Act 1972 (c. xxiii))
South Staffordshire Waterworks Act 1950	14 Geo. 6. c. xii	12 July 1950
An Act to revive the powers of the South Staffordshire Waterworks Company for the construction of waterworks and for other purposes.
Wakefield Extension Act 1950 (repealed)	14 Geo. 6. c. xiii	12 July 1950
An Act to extend the boundaries of the city of Wakefield. (Repealed by West Yorkshire Act 1980 (c. xiv))
Gateshead and District Tramways Act 1950	14 Geo. 6. c. xiv	12 July 1950
An Act to extend the powers of the Gateshead and District Tramways Company to run public service vehicles to repeal the powers of the Company to run trolley vehicles to make further provision with respect to the abandonment of the tramways of the Company to change the name of the Company and for other purposes.
London County Council (Money) Act 1950 (repealed)	14 Geo. 6. c. xv	12 July 1950
An Act to regulate expenditure on capital account and lending of money by the London County Council during the financial period from the first day of April one thousand nine hundred and fifty to the thirtieth day of September one thousand nine hundred and fifty-one and for other purposes. (Repealed by London County Council (Loans) Act 1955 (4 & 5 Eliz. 2. c. xxvi))
Mid Southern Utility Act 1950	14 Geo. 6. c. xvi	12 July 1950
An Act to make provision for the distribution of the assets and dissolution of the Mid Southern Utility Company and for other purposes.
Tyne Improvement Act 1950	14 Geo. 6. c. xvii	12 July 1950
An Act to increase the borrowing powers of and to enact further financial provision with respect to the Tyne Improvement Commissioners to amend the enactments relating to the period of office nomination appointment election and co-option of those Commissioners and the auditors of their accounts to make further provision with respect to the rates and charges leviable by the Commissioners and for other purposes.
Runcorn-Widnes Bridge Act 1950	14 Geo. 6. c. xviii	12 July 1950
An Act to extend the time for the acquisition of lands by the Cheshire County Council and the Lancashire County Council under the Cheshire and Lancashire County Councils (Runcorn-Widnes Bridge &c.) Act 1947 (Note: Cheshire and Lancashire County Councils (Runcorn-Widnes Bridge &c.) Act 1947 (10 & 11 Geo. 6. c. xxix)) and for other purposes.
Carlisle Extension Act 1950 (repealed)	14 Geo. 6. c. xix	12 July 1950
An Act to extend the boundaries of the city of Carlisle and for other purposes. (Repealed by Cumbria Act 1982 (c. xv))
Faculty of Homœopathy Act 1950 or the Faculty of Homeopathy Act 1950	14 Geo. 6. c. xx	12 July 1950
An Act to incorporate and confer powers upon the Faculty of Homœopathy and for other purposes.
Mersey Docks and Harbour Board Act 1950	14 Geo. 6. c. xxi	12 July 1950
An Act to make further provision with respect to rates and charges leviable by the Mersey Docks and Harbour Board to increase the borrowing powers of the Board and for other purposes.
Prescelly Water Act 1950	14 Geo. 6. c. xxii	12 July 1950
An Act to repeal and re-enact with amendments the enactments as to the taking of water by the Prescelly Water Board from the Afon Syfynwy by means of reservoirs on that river and as to the discharge of compensation water from such reservoirs and for other purposes.
Port of London Act 1950 (repealed)	14 Geo. 6. c. xxiii	12 July 1950
An Act to confer further powers on the Port of London Authority and for other purposes. (Repealed by Port of London Act 1968 (c. xxxii))
Forth Road Bridge Order Confirmation Act 1950	14 Geo. 6. c. xxiv	28 July 1950
An Act to confirm a Provisional Order under the Private Legislation Procedure (Scotland) Act 1936 relating to the Forth Road Bridge.
	Forth Road Bridge Order 1950 Provisional Order to extend the time for the acquisition of lands by the Forth Road Bridge Joint Board to authorise the said Board to acquire additional lands and to construct further works to confer further powers on the said Board and for other purposes.	
Leith Harbour and Docks Order Confirmation Act 1950 (repealed)	14 Geo. 6. c. xxv	28 July 1950
An Act to confirm a Provisional Order under the Private Legislation Procedure (Scotland) Act 1936 relating to Leith Harbour and Docks. (Repealed by Statute Law (Repeals) Act 1986 (c. 12))
	Leith Harbour and Docks Order 1950 Provisional Order to amend the provisions of the Leith Harbour and Docks Consolidation Order 1935 relative to the rates which the Commissioners for the harbour and docks of Leith may levy to authorise additional borrowing and for other purposes.	
Merchants House of Glasgow (Crematorium) Order Confirmation Act 1950 (repealed)	14 Geo. 6. c. xxvi	28 July 1950
An Act to confirm a Provisional Order under the Private Legislation Procedure (Scotland) Act 1936 relating to the Merchants House of Glasgow (Crematorium). (Repealed by Statute Law (Repeals) Act 1998 (c. 43))
	Merchants House of Glasgow (Crematorium) Order 1950 Provisional Order to authorise the Merchants House of Glasgow to provide maintain and carry on a crematorium in the Glasgow Necropolis and for other purposes.	
Edinburgh Corporation Order Confirmation Act 1950 (repealed)	14 Geo. 6. c. xxvii	28 July 1950
An Act to confirm a Provisional Order under the Private Legislation Procedure (Scotland) Act 1936 relating to Edinburgh Corporation. (Repealed by Edinburgh Corporation Order Confirmation Act 1964 (c. xli))
	Edinburgh Corporation Order 1950 Provisional Order to confer further powers on the Corporation of the city of Edinburgh and to make provision with respect to the regulation and control of cabs fire precautions the finance health local government and administration of the city to confer further powers on the Corporation with respect to the Waverley Market and the site thereof to extend the time for the construction of tramways and street improvements and for other purposes.	
Granton Harbour Order Confirmation Act 1950 (repealed)	14 Geo. 6. c. xxviii	28 July 1950
An Act to confirm a Provisional Order under the Private Legislation Procedure (Scotland) Act 1936 relating to Granton Harbour. (Repealed by Statute Law (Repeals) Act 1986 (c. 12))
	Granton Harbour Order 1950 Provisional Order to make provision with regard to the charges rates and dues leviable at the harbour of Granton and for other purposes.	
Greenock Port and Harbours Order Confirmation Act 1950 (repealed)	14 Geo. 6. c. xxix	28 July 1950
An Act to confirm a Provisional Order under the Private Legislation Procedure (Scotland) Act 1936 relating to Greenock Port and Harbours. (Repealed by Statute Law (Repeals) Act 1986 (c. 12))
	Greenock Port and Harbours Order 1950 Provisional Order to confer further rating and charging powers on the Trustees of the port and harbours of Greenock and for other purposes.	
Clyde Navigation Order Confirmation Act 1950	14 Geo. 6. c. xxx	28 July 1950
An Act to confirm a Provisional Order under the Private Legislation Procedure (Scotland) Act 1936 relating to Clyde Navigation.
	Clyde Navigation Order 1950 Provisional Order to authorise the Trustees of the Clyde Navigation to execute new works to amend the provisions of the Clyde Navigation Acts 1858 to 1929 relating to rates dues tolls rents and charges and for other purposes.	
Darlington Corporation Trolley Vehicles (Additional Routes) Order Confirmation Act 1950	14 Geo. 6. c. xxxi	28 July 1950
An Act to confirm a Provisional Order made by the Minister of Transport under the Darlington Corporation (Transport &c.) Act 1925 (Note: Darlington Corporation (Transport &c.) Act 1925 (15 & 16 Geo. 5. c. cxvi)) relating to Darlington Corporation trolley vehicles.
	Darlington Corporation Trolley Vehicles (Additional Routes) Order 1950 Provisional Order authorising the mayor aldermen and burgesses of the county borough of Darlington to use trolley vehicles upon additional routes in the county borough of Darlington.	
Pier and Harbour Order (Hartlepool) Confirmation Act 1950	14 Geo. 6. c. xxxii	28 July 1950
An Act to confirm a Provisional Order made by the Minister of Transport under the General Pier and Harbour Act 1861 (Note: General Pier and Harbour Act 1861 (24 & 25 Vict. c. 45)) relating to Hartlepool.
	Hartlepool Port and Harbour Order 1950 Provisional Order to authorise the Hartlepool Port and Harbour Commissioners to levy take and receive increased dues duties rates and tolls to provide for the revision of dues duties rates and tolls and for other purposes.	
Pier and Harbour Order (Caernarvon) Confirmation Act 1950 (repealed)	14 Geo. 6. c. xxxiii	28 July 1950
An Act to confirm a Provisional Order made by the Minister of Transport under the General Pier and Harbour Act 1861 relating to Caernarvon. (Repealed by Caernarfon Harbour Revision Order 1989 (SI 1989/2493))
	Caernarvon Harbour Order 1950 Provisional Order to increase certain of the maximum rates leviable by the Caernarvon Harbour Trustees to authorise the levying of additional rates and for other purposes.	
Pier and Harbour Order (Great Yarmouth) Confirmation Act 1950	14 Geo. 6. c. xxxiv	28 July 1950
An Act to confirm a Provisional Order made by the Minister of Transport under the General Pier and Harbour Act 1861 relating to Great Yarmouth.
	Great Yarmouth Port and Haven Order 1950 Provisional Order to vary the tolls leviable by the Great Yarmouth Port and Haven Commissioners and for other purposes.	
Pier and Harbour Order (Workington) Confirmation Act 1950	14 Geo. 6. c. xxxv	28 July 1950
An Act to confirm a Provisional Order made by the Minister of Transport under the General Pier and Harbour Act 1861 relating to Workington.
	Workington Harbour and Dock Order 1950 Provisional Order to authorise the Workington Harbour and Dock Board to fix demand take and recover increased rates to provide for the revision of the rates and for other purposes.	
Pier and Harbour Order (Cattewater) Confirmation Act 1950	14 Geo. 6. c. xxxvi	28 July 1950
An Act to confirm a Provisional Order made by the Minister of Transport under the General Pier and Harbour Act 1861 relating to Cattewater.
	Cattewater Harbour Order 1950 Provisional Order to change the name of the Cattewater Commissioners to make provision for the appointment of two additional Commissioners to make amendments in the provisions relating to the appointment and election of Commissioners to increase certain of the maximum rates leviable by the Commissioners and to authorise additional rates to authorise additional borrowing powers to make provision for the removal of wrecks and for other purposes.	
Dover Corporation Act 1950 (repealed)	14 Geo. 6. c. xxxvii	28 July 1950
An Act to extend the boundaries of the borough of Dover to make provision with respect to the sale of coke coal and wood fuel and for other purposes. (Repealed by County of Kent Act 1981 (c. xviii))
Leyton Corporation Act 1950	14 Geo. 6. c. xxxviii	28 July 1950
An Act to make further provision in reference to the improvement health local government and finances of the borough of Leyton and for other purposes.
London County Council (Woolwich Subsidences) Act 1950	14 Geo. 6. c. xxxix	28 July 1950
An Act to confer powers upon the London County Council with respect to the control of the use and occupation of certain lands in the metropolitan borough of Woolwich where subsidence is likely to occur and to make provision for matters in connection therewith.
Doncaster Corporation Act 1950	14 Geo. 6. c. xl	28 July 1950
An Act to extend the boundaries of the borough of Doncaster and for purposes incidental thereto to confer further powers on the Corporation of that borough in regard to lands to authorise the supply of hot water and of heat to make further provision in reference to the health improvement local government markets undertaking and finances of the borough of Doncaster to increase the tolls leviable by the Corporation in connection with their markets undertaking and for other purposes.
Towyn Trewan Common Act 1950	14 Geo. 6. c. xli	28 July 1950
An Act to make provision for the extinguishment of certain common or commonable rights and other rights in respect of part of Towyn Trewan Common in the county of Anglesey and for the payment and apportionment of the compensation money payable in respect of such extinguishment and for other purposes.
London County Council (General Powers) Act 1950	14 Geo. 6. c. xlii	28 July 1950
An Act to confer further powers upon the London County Council and other authorities and for other purposes.
Norwich Extension Act 1950 (repealed)	14 Geo. 6. c. xliii	28 July 1950
An Act to extend the boundaries of the city and county of the city of Norwich and for other purposes. (Repealed by Norwich City Council Act 1984 (c. xxiii))
Wisbech Corporation Act 1950	14 Geo. 6. c. xliv	28 July 1950
An Act to make further provision with regard to the port and harbour undertaking and the markets undertaking of the mayor aldermen and burgesses of the borough of Wisbech to make further provision with respect to the funds of the Corporation and with respect to their income and expenditure and for other purposes.
Ipswich Dock Act 1950	14 Geo. 6. c. xlv	28 July 1950
An Act to confer further powers on the Ipswich Dock Commission and for other purposes.
Cardiff Extension Act 1950	14 Geo. 6. c. xlvi	28 July 1950
An Act to extend the boundaries of the city and county borough of Cardiff and for purposes incidental thereto.
Dover Harbour Act 1950 (repealed)	14 Geo. 6. c. xlvii	28 July 1950
An Act to authorise the Dover Harbour Board to construct new works and for other purposes. (Repealed by Dover Harbour Consolidation Act 1954 (2 & 3 Eliz. 2. c. iv))
Plymouth Extension Act 1950 (repealed)	14 Geo. 6. c. xlviii	28 July 1950
An Act to extend the boundaries of the city of Plymouth and for other purposes. (Repealed by Plymouth City Council Act 1987 (c. iv))
Lee Conservancy Catchment Board Act 1950	14 Geo. 6. c. xlix	28 July 1950
An Act to consolidate with amendments the provisions relating to the constitution of the Lee Conservancy Catchment Board to extend the time for the execution of works to make further provision in reference to payments by the Metropolitan Water Board and the increase and application of sums which may be demanded from local authorities the superannuation of officers and the preservation of the purity of the river Lee and for other purposes.
Thames Conservancy Act 1950	14 Geo. 6. c. l	28 July 1950
An Act to amend the Thames Conservancy Act 1932 (Note: Thames Conservancy Act 1932 (22 & 23 Geo. 5. c. xxxvii)) to extend the powers and make further provision for the revenue of the Conservators of the river Thames and for other purposes.
Gloucester Extension Act 1950	14 Geo. 6. c. li	28 July 1950
An Act to extend the boundaries of the city of Gloucester in the county of the city of Gloucester and for purposes incidental thereto.
Middlesex County Council Act 1950	14 Geo. 6. c. lii	28 July 1950
An Act to amend the Middlesex County Council Act, 1944; (Note: Middlesex County Council Act 1944 (7 & 8 Geo. 6. c.xxi)) to confer further powers on the Middlesex County Council and the local authorities in Middlesex in relation to the local government improvement and health of the county; to make further provision for the superannuation of employees; and for other purposes.
British Transport Commission Act 1950	14 Geo. 6. c. liii	28 July 1950
An Act to empower the British Transport Commission to construct works and to acquire lands; to extend the time for the compulsory purchase of certain lands the completion of certain works and the exercise of certain powers; to confer further powers on the Commission; and for other purposes.
Sunderland Extension Act 1950 (repealed)	14 Geo. 6. c. liv	28 July 1950
An Act to extend the boundaries of the county borough of Sunderland and for purposes incidental thereto. (Repealed by Tyne and Wear Act 1980 (c. xliii))
Oldham Extension Act 1950	14 Geo. 6. c. lv	28 July 1950
An Act to extend the boundaries of the borough of Oldham; and for purposes incidental thereto.
Manchester Ship Canal Act 1950	14 Geo. 6. c. lvi	28 July 1950
An Act to empower the Manchester Ship Canal Company to acquire lands; to increase the maximum dues tolls rates and charges leviable by the Company; to make further provisions with regard to the finances of the Company; and for other purposes.
Manchester Corporation Act 1950	14 Geo. 6. c. lvii	28 July 1950
An Act to empower the lord mayor aldermen and citizens of the city of Manchester to acquire and develop lands in the borough of Middleton and to guarantee the interest upon loans of the Manchester Ship Canal Company and to make further provision in reference to the water transport and markets undertakings of the city and for the health local government and improvement of the city and for other purposes.
Wolverhampton Corporation Act 1950 (repealed)	14 Geo. 6. c. lviii	28 July 1950
An Act to extend the boundaries of the borough of Wolverhampton; to authorise the Mayor Aldermen and Burgesses of that borough to supply heat and hot water; to make further provision in reference to lands waterworks and trolley vehicles and the improvement health local government and finances of the borough; to provide for the winding up of the Wolverhampton New Waterworks Company; and for other purpose. (Repealed by Wolverhampton Corporation Act 1969 (c. lx))
South Shields Extension Act 1950 (repealed)	14 Geo. 6. c. lix	28 July 1950
An Act to extend the boundaries of the County Borough of South Shields; and for purposes incidental thereto. (Repealed by Tyne and Wear Act 1980 (c. xliii))
Bristol Corporation Act 1950	14 Geo. 6. c. lx	28 July 1950
An Act to authorise the Lord Mayor Aldermen and Burgesses of the City of Bristol to supply hot water and heat by means of hot water or steam; to make further provision for the health improvement local government and finances of the City; to enact provisions with respect to the superannuation of certain officers and servants; and for other purposes.
Ilford Corporation (Drainage) Act 1950	14 Geo. 6. c. lxi	28 July 1950
An Act to empower the mayor aldermen and burgesses of the borough of Ilford to execute works for the improvement of the drainage of the borough to provide for the protection of certain streams pending the completion of such works and for other purposes.
Eton Rural District Council Act 1950	14 Geo. 6. c. lxii	28 July 1950
An Act to make further and better provision for the improvement health local government and finance of the rural district of Eton; and for other purposes.
Bootle Extension Act 1950	14 Geo. 6. c. lxiii	28 July 1950
An Act to extend the boundaries of the borough of Bootle; and for other purposes.
Bath Extension Act 1950	14 Geo. 6. c. lxiv	26 October 1950
An Act to extend the boundaries of the city and county borough of Bath; and for purposes incidental thereto.

=== Sources ===
- The Public General Acts and Church Assembly Measure of 1950. London: Her Majesty's Stationery Office. 1954. pp. 1–947 – via Google Books.
- The Public General Acts and Church Assembly Measure of 1950. London: Her Majesty's Stationery Office. 1954. pp. 1–947 – via Google Books.
- The Journals of the House of Commons (PDF). Vol. 205 (March 1950 – December 1950). pp. 3–246 – via parliament.uk.
- Chronological Table of the Statutes: Covering the Period from 1235 to the End of 1971. London: Her Majesty's Stationery Office. 1972. pp. 1034–1045. ISBN 978-0-11-840096-1 – via Google Books.
- "UK Public General Acts from 1950". legislation.gov.uk. The National Archives.
- "UK Local Acts from 1950". legislation.gov.uk. The National Archives.
- "Chronological Tables of Local Acts: Part 175 (1950)". legislation.gov.uk. The National Archives.

== 14 & 15 Geo. 6 ==
The second session of the 39th Parliament of the United Kingdom, which met from 31 October 1950 until 4 October 1951.

This session was also traditionally cited as 14 & 15 G. 6.

=== Public general acts ===
Short title	Citation	Royal assent
Long title
Expiring Laws Continuance Act 1950 (repealed)	14 & 15 Geo. 6. c. 1	15 December 1950
An Act to continue certain expiring laws. (Repealed by Statute Law Revision Act 1953 (2 & 3 Eliz. 2. c. 5))
Superannuation Act 1950 (repealed)	14 & 15 Geo. 6. c. 2	15 December 1950
An Act to provide for disregarding certain temporary abatements of salary in calculating gratuities under sections thirty-nine and forty of the Superannuation Act, 1949, (Note: Superannuation Act 1949 (12, 13 & 14 Geo. 6. c. 44)) and allowances and gratuities of officers mentioned in Part I of the Third Schedule to the Supreme Court of Judicature (Consolidation) Act, 1925; (Note: Supreme Court of Judicature (Consolidation) Act 1925 (15 & 16 Geo. 5. c. 49)) and for reckoning as unestablished service certain service in the armed forces and other similar service performed by persons recruited to the civil service by reconstruction competitions after the thirtieth day of June, nineteen hundred and fifty. (Repealed by Judicial Pensions Act 1981 (c. 20))
Exchequer and Audit Departments Act 1950	14 & 15 Geo. 6. c. 3	15 December 1950
An Act to make further provision as to the salary and superannuation of the Comptroller and Auditor General.
Colonial Development and Welfare Act 1950 (repealed)	14 & 15 Geo. 6. c. 4	15 December 1950
An Act to increase the amounts payable out of moneys provided by Parliament for the purposes of schemes under section one of the Colonial Development and Welfare Act, 1940, (Note: Colonial Development and Welfare Act 1940 (3 & 4 Geo. 6. c. 40)) and to repeal so much of subsection (5) of that section as limits its application to colonies not possessing responsible government. (Repealed by Colonial Development and Welfare Act 1955 (3 & 4 Eliz. 2. c. 6))
Public Works Loans Act 1950 (repealed)	14 & 15 Geo. 6. c. 5	15 December 1950
An Act to grant money for the purpose of certain local loans out of the Local Loans Fund, and for other purposes relating to local loans. (Repealed by Public Works Loans Act 1964 (c. 9))
Solicitors Act 1950 (repealed)	14 & 15 Geo. 6. c. 6	15 December 1950
An Act to enable proper financial provision to be made for the carrying out by the Law Society of the purposes of the Solicitors Acts, 1932 to 1941. (Repealed by Solicitors Act 1957 (5 & 6 Eliz. 2. c. 27))
Dangerous Drugs (Amendment) Act 1950 (repealed)	14 & 15 Geo. 6. c. 7	15 December 1950
An Act to facilitate the consolidation of enactments relating to dangerous drugs by removing limitations on the extension to Northern Ireland of certain Acts amending the Dangerous Drugs Act, 1920, (Note: Dangerous Drugs Act 1920 (10 & 11 Geo. 5. c. 46)) repealing the corresponding Acts of the Parliament of Northern Ireland and making necessary consequential amendments; and to make, as respects dangerous drugs, certain other amendments of law which are requisite in consequence of the supersession of the League of Nations by the United Nations or expedient with a view to the consolidation of such enactments as aforesaid. (Repealed by Dangerous Drugs Act 1951 (14 & 15 Geo. 6. c. 48))
European Payments Union (Financial Provisions) Act 1950 (repealed)	14 & 15 Geo. 6. c. 8	15 December 1950
An Act to make certain provision of a financial nature in connection with the operation of the European Payments Union Agreement and the furnishing of American aid in connection therewith. (Repealed by National Loans Act 1968 (c. 13))
Restoration of Pre-War Trade Practices Act 1950 (repealed)	14 & 15 Geo. 6. c. 9	15 December 1950
An Act to amend the Restoration of Pre-War Trade Practices Act, 1942, (Note: Restoration of Pre-War Trade Practices Act 1942 (5 & 6 Geo. 6. c. 9)) with respect to the period by reference to which obligations are imposed on employers in respect of departures from trade practices and the time at which such obligations are to take effect, and with respect to the application of that Act to Northern Ireland. (Repealed by Statute Law (Repeals) Act 1986 (c. 12))
Reinstatement in Civil Employment Act 1950 (repealed)	14 & 15 Geo. 6. c. 10	15 December 1950
An Act to make further provision for the reinstatement in civil employment of persons who have served whole-time in the armed forces of the Crown, and for safeguarding the employment of persons liable to serve as aforesaid; and for purposes connected with the matters aforesaid. (Repealed by Reserve Forces (Safeguard of Employment) Act 1985 (c. 17))
Administration of Justice (Pensions) Act 1950 (repealed)	14 & 15 Geo. 6. c. 11	15 December 1950
An Act to amend the law relating to the pensions and other benefits payable to and in respect of persons who administer justice, and for purposes connected therewith. (Repealed by Judicial Pensions Act 1981 (c. 20))

=== Local acts ===
Short title	Citation	Royal assent
Long title
Kirkcaldy Burgh Extension, &c. Order Confirmation Act 1950	14 & 15 Geo. 6. c. i	15 December 1950
An Act to confirm a Provisional Order under the Private Legislation Procedure (Scotland) Act 1936 (Note: Private Legislation Procedure (Scotland) Act 1936 (26 Geo. 5 & 1 Edw. 8. c. 52)) relating to Kirkcaldy Burgh Extension, &c.
	Kirkcaldy Burgh Extension, &c. Order 1950	
Glasgow Corporation Sewage Order Confirmation Act 1950	14 & 15 Geo. 6. c. ii	15 December 1950
An Act to confirm a Provisional Order under the Private Legislation Procedure (Scotland) Act 1936 relating to Glasgow Corporation Sewage.
	Glasgow Corporation Sewage Order 1950	
Ross and Cromarty County Council (Kyle of Lochalsh Fishery Pier) Order Confirmation Act 1950 (repealed)	14 & 15 Geo. 6. c. iii	15 December 1950
An Act to confirm a Provisional Order under the Private Legislation Procedure (Scotland) Act 1936 relating to Ross and Cromarty County Council (Kyle of Lochalsh Fishery Pier). (Repealed by Highland Region Harbours (Miscellaneous Powers) Order Confirmation Act 1987 (c. xxv))
	Ross and Cromarty County Council (Kyle of Lochalsh Fishery Pier) Order 1950	
Dundee Harbour and Tay Ferries Order Confirmation Act 1950 (repealed)	14 & 15 Geo. 6. c. iv	15 December 1950
An Act to confirm a Provisional Order under the Private Legislation Procedure (Scotland) Act 1936 relating to Dundee Harbour and Tay Ferries. (Repealed by Dundee Harbour Act 1975 (c. xvii))
	Dundee Harbour and Tay Ferries Order 1950	
Inverness County Council (Armadale Pier and Harbour, &c.) Order Confirmation Act 1950 (repealed)	14 & 15 Geo. 6. c. v	15 December 1950
An Act to confirm a Provisional Order under the Private Legislation Procedure (Scotland) Act 1936 relating to Inverness County Council (Armadale Pier and Harbour &c.). (Repealed by Highland Regional Council (Harbours) Order Confirmation Act 1991 (c. xii))
	Inverness County Council (Armadale Pier and Harbour, &c.) Order 1950	

=== Sources ===
- The Public General Acts and Church Assembly Measure of 1950. London: Her Majesty's Stationery Office. 1954. pp. 948–1000 – via Google Books.
- The Public General Acts and Church Assembly Measure of 1950. London: Her Majesty's Stationery Office. 1954. pp. 948–1000 – via Google Books.
- The Journals of the House of Commons (PDF). Vol. 206 (October 1950 – October 1951). pp. 3–332 – via parliament.uk.
- Chronological Table of the Statutes: Covering the Period from 1235 to the End of 1971. London: Her Majesty's Stationery Office. 1972. pp. 1045–1047. ISBN 978-0-11-840096-1 – via Google Books.
- "UK Public General Acts from 1950". legislation.gov.uk. The National Archives.
- "UK Local Acts from 1950". legislation.gov.uk. The National Archives.
- "Chronological Tables of Local Acts: Part 175 (1950)". legislation.gov.uk. The National Archives.

== See also ==
- List of acts of the Parliament of the United Kingdom
