= Baron Lucas of Chilworth =

Barony in the Peerage of the United Kingdom

Baron Lucas of Chilworth, of Chilworth in the County of Southampton, is a title in the Peerage of the United Kingdom. It was created on 27 June 1946 for the businessman and Labour politician George Lucas. He later served as Captain of the Yeomen of the Guard in the Labour government of Clement Attlee. His son, the second Baron, sat in contrast to his father on the Conservative benches in the House of Lords and served under Margaret Thatcher as Parliamentary Under-Secretary of State for Trade and Industry from 1984 to 1987. As of 2010 the title is held by his eldest son, the third Baron, who succeeded in 2001.

The Hon. Ivor Lucas CMG (25 July 1927 – 7 April 2018), second son of the first Baron, served as British Ambassador to Syria from 1982 to 1984.

== Barons Lucas of Chilworth (1946) ==
- George William Lucas, 1st Baron Lucas of Chilworth (1896–1967)
- Michael William George Lucas, 2nd Baron Lucas of Chilworth (1926–2001)
- Simon William Lucas, 3rd Baron Lucas of Chilworth (b. 1957)

The heir apparent is the present holder's son, the Hon. John Ronald Muir Lucas (b. 1995).

Coat of arms of Baron Lucas of Chilworth
Crest A Representation of Apollo affrontée Or Escutcheon Per fess wavy Or and Azure in chief between two Annulets a Rose Gules barbed and seeded proper and in base two Bars wavy Argent surmounted by a Bull's Head caboshed Sable Supporters Dexter: a Lion Or; Sinister: a Russian Bear Sable, each resting the interior paw upon an Annulet therein a Rose Gules barbed and seeded proper Motto Labor Vincit Omnia (Labour Conquers All)
