= Samuel Gbadebo Odewumi =

Nigerian professor

- Born: Nigeria
- Citizenship: Nigerian
- Occupations: Professor of Transport Planning and Policy
- Employer: Lagos State University (LASU)
- Known for: Transport planning, traffic management, sustainable mobility
- Title: Acting Vice-Chancellor, University of Uyo

Samuel Gbadebo Odewumi is a Nigerian professor of transport planning and policy at Lagos State University (LASU). In December 2025, he was appointed Acting Vice-Chancellor of the University of Uyo.

== Early life and education ==
Odewumi earned a B.Sc. in Geography from Obafemi Awolowo University in 1982. He later obtained postgraduate diploma in Education (University of Ibadan, 1988) and Surveying (University of Lagos, 1989). He completed an M.Sc. in Geography at the University of Lagos in 1991 and a Ph.D. in Transport Studies at the same institution in 2004. He also pursued executive management training at Stellenbosch University (2011) and Harvard University (2017).

== Academic career ==
Odewumi is a professor at LASU’s School of Transport and Logistics, where he teaches courses in transport planning, traffic management, and logistics.

He has served in several leadership roles, including:

- Director, Centre for Planning Studies at LASU
- Chairman, Academic Staff Union of Universities (ASUU-LASU)
- Pioneer Director of Development, Osun State University, Osogbo
- Senior Research Fellow, National Universities Commission (NUC)

== Research and contributions ==
His research focuses on urban transport planning, traffic congestion, public transport systems, and sustainable mobility.

Odewumi has participated in international mobility studies across Ghana, Uganda, Kenya, and Bangladesh.

He has also trained in Environmental Monitoring & GIS Techniques (California, US), Data Modelling (Nancy University, France), and Logistics & Supply Chain Management (Kigali, Rwanda).

== Professional memberships ==
Odewumi is a fellow of several professional bodies, including:

- Chartered Institute of Logistics and Transport (FCILT)
- Institute of Transport Administration (FInsTA)
- Chartered Institute of Logistics Management (FCICLM)

== Publications ==
Odewumi has published extensively in journals and conference proceedings. His academic footprint is indexed on Google Scholar, ORCID, and Scopus, reflecting his contributions to transport research.
