= George Lucas, 1st Baron Lucas of Chilworth =

British businessman and Labour politician

George William Lucas, 1st Baron Lucas of Chilworth (29 March 1896 – 11 October 1967), was a British businessman and Labour politician.

Lucas was the son of Percy William Lucas and Annette Lucy Lucas of Oxford. He was involved in the motor trade industry and served during the Second World War as Chair of the National Joint Industrial Council of the Motor Vehicle Retail and Repairing Trade. On 27 June 1946 he was given a peerage by the Labour government of Clement Attlee as Baron Lucas of Chilworth, of Chilworth in the County of Southampton. He then served under Attlee as a Lord-in-waiting (government whip in the House of Lords) from 1948 to 1949, as Captain of the Yeomen of the Guard (Deputy Chief Whip in the House of Lords) from 1949 to 1950 and as Parliamentary Secretary to the Ministry of Transport from 1950 to 1951. However, he later fell out with the Labour Party over nationalisation and moved to the cross-benches.

The future Lord Lucas married Sonia Finkelstein (died 1979), the daughter of Marcus Finkelstein, a Latvian fishing-industry tycoon, in 1917. He died in October 1967, aged 71, and was succeeded in the barony by his eldest son Michael, who became a Conservative government minister. His second son, Ivor Lucas, became a diplomat and served as British Ambassador to Syria and Oman.

Coat of arms of George Lucas, 1st Baron Lucas of Chilworth
Crest A Representation of Apollo affrontée Or Escutcheon Per fess wavy Or and Azure in chief between two Annulets a Rose Gules barbed and seeded proper and in base two Bars wavy Argent surmounted by a Bull's Head caboshed Sable Supporters Dexter: a Lion Or; Sinister: a Russian Bear Sable, each resting the interior paw upon an Annulet therein a Rose Gules barbed and seeded proper Motto Labor Vincit Omnia (Labour Conquers All)

== Notes ==
Political offices
Preceded by The Lord Henderson	Lord-in-waiting; 1948–1949	Succeeded by The Lord Darwen
Preceded by The Lord Shepherd	Captain of the Yeomen of the Guard; 1949–1950	Succeeded by The Earl of Lucan
Preceded by James Callaghan	Parliamentary Secretary to the Ministry of Transport; 1950–1951	Succeeded by Joseph Gurney Braithwaite
Peerage of the United Kingdom
New creation	Baron Lucas of Chilworth; 1946–1967	Succeeded by Michael William George Lucas
