= Frank Marshall, Baron Marshall of Leeds =

British politician (1915–1990)

The Lord Marshall of Leeds KBE
- Marshall taking his seat in the House of Lords (1980)

Member of the House of Lords Lord Temporal
- In office 11 July 1980 – 1 November 1990; Life Peerage

Leader of Leeds City Council
- In office 1967–1972
- Preceded by: Unknown
- Succeeded by: Sir Albert King

Leeds City Councillor for Allerton Ward
- In office 1962–1968
- Preceded by: M. Mustill
- Succeeded by: Ward abolished

Personal details
- Born: Frank Shaw Marshall; 26 September 1915 Wakefield, England
- Died: 11 January 1990 (aged 74)
- Party: Conservative
- Spouse: Mary Barr
- Children: 2
- Education: Queen Elizabeth Grammar School
- Alma mater: Downing College, Cambridge

Frank Shaw Marshall, Baron Marshall of Leeds KBE (26 September 1915 – 1 November 1990) was a British lawyer and politician who was a member of the House of Lords from 1980 until his death in 1990.

== Biography ==
Marshall was born in Wakefield and attended Queen Elizabeth Grammar School. He then studied law at Downing College, Cambridge. During the Second World War, he served in the Royal Tank Regiment, and after the war qualified as a solicitor. He was a member of Leeds City Council from 1960 and led the council from 1967 to 1972.

He was knighted in 1971 for "services to local government" and was created a life peer on 11 July 1980, taking the title Baron Marshall of Leeds, of Shadwell in the City of Leeds. He was considered to be "a grandee of the Conservative Party at the national level".

He was chairman of the Municipal Mutual Insurance Group of Companies from 1978, and of Dartford International Ferry Terminal Ltd from 1987; a director of the Leeds and Holbeck Building Society 1962–1968 and its president in 1967–69 and 1977–79; and a director of several other companies, including Barr & Wallace Arnold Trust PLC from 1953. From 1983–1987, he served as the President of the Institute of Transport Administration.

In 1978, he was commissioned to review the local government of London, at a time when there was increasing pressure to abolish the Greater London Council, hence he produced the Marshall Report. He was an honorary freeman of Leeds and a freeman of the City of London.

He married Mary Barr, daughter of the founder of Barr and Wallace Arnold coach holiday company, and they had two daughters, Angela and Virginia. His daughters donated the glass Angel Screen by Sally Scott to Leeds Minster in 1997, in memory of both their parents.
