= Herbert Matthews (agriculturalist) =

English agriculturalist and politician (1870 – 1958)

Sir Alfred Herbert Henry Matthews (25 July 1870 – c. 21 July 1958) was an English agriculturalist and politician.

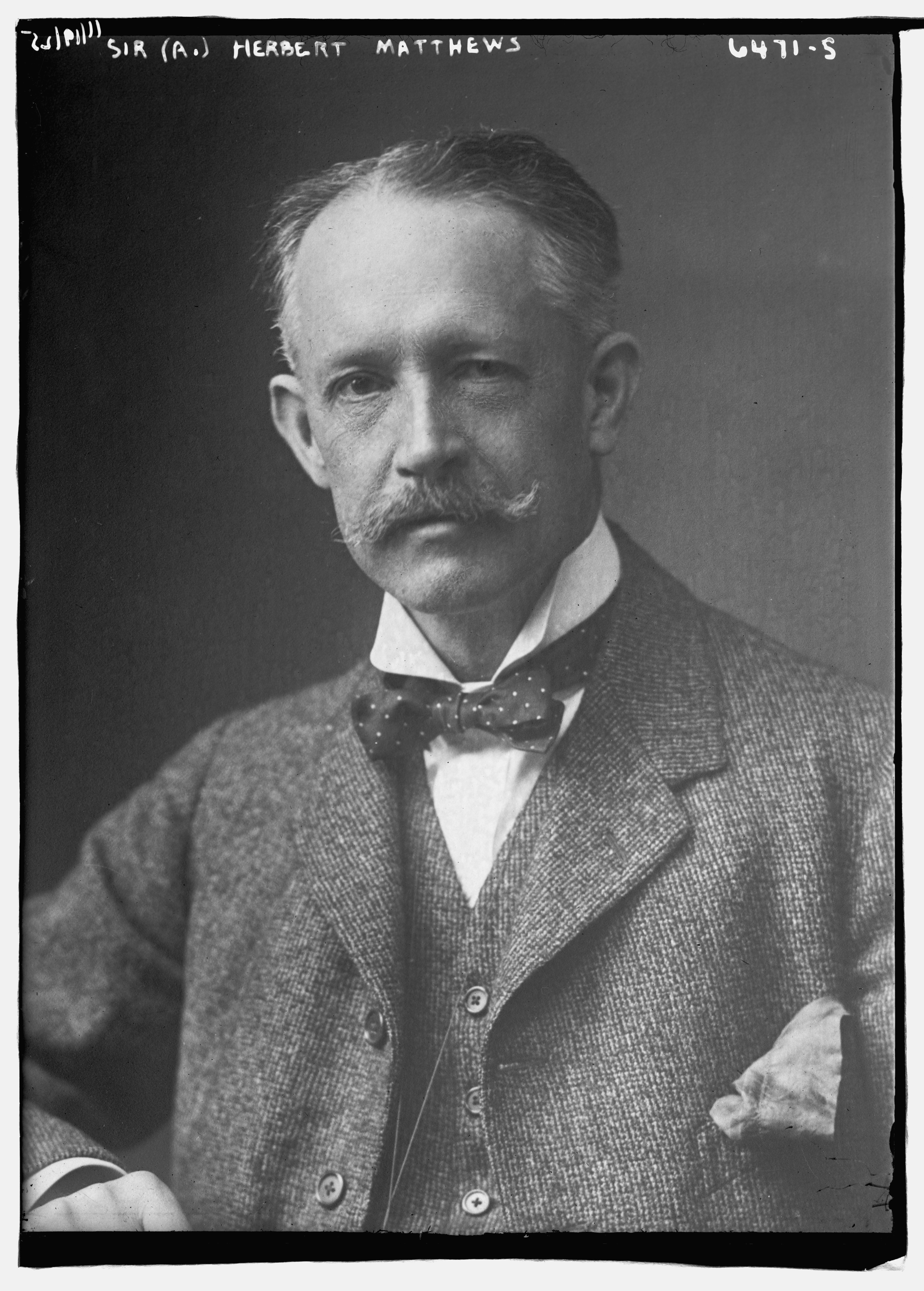

== Early life and education ==
Matthews was born in Hanborough, Oxfordshire, the son of Alfred Thomas Matthews, a civil servant and journalist, and Elizabeth Townsend. He was educated at College House School, Edmonton.

== Career ==
Matthews became the Secretary of the Central Chamber of Agriculture in 1901 and continued in this role until 1927. In 1926, Matthews took a reduction in his salary of £120 to ensure that the finances of the Central Chamber remained stable, in return for a decrease in expenditure.

Matthews was President of the Institute of Traffic Administration and also President of the Industrial Transport Association. Matthews was also a President of the Mansion Housing Association and a Chairman of Fraser Trust Ltd. Matthews also sat on the Agricultural Committee of the British Science Guild. In Parliament, Lord Lloyd referenced Sir Herbert, saying "I need not tell your Lordships who Sir Herbert Matthews is or cite the value of his authority to you: it is well known."

He was knighted in 1916.

== Personal life ==
In 1900, Matthews married Ada Glover Mace (died 1948), daughter of William Glover Mace. Following her death, he married secondly Alma Gordon, widow of Major Clisdal.

== Published works ==
- Fifty Years of Agricultural Politics: Being the History of the Central Chamber of Agriculture (1915)

== See also ==
- Rural Party (UK)
