= Rural Party (UK) =

- Honorary Secretary: Sir Herbert Matthews
- Honorary Treasurer: George Cooper
- Founded: 1907 (as Independent Agriculture Parliamentary Party)
- Dissolved: 1924
- Ideology: Agrarianism

The Rural Party was a political party in the United Kingdom that was founded in 1907 as the Independent Agriculture Parliamentary Party, and revived in 1923 as the Rural Party.

The purpose of the party was set out by Sir Herbert Matthews in 1924 "to be the representation in Parliament of the rural population as country people having essentially country interests of all kinds, and not as adherents to any of the existing parties."

== History ==
The idea of a political party dedicated to rural affairs came about in 1907, when on 25 May the Staffordshire Chamber of Agriculture passed a resolution urging the Central Chamber of Agriculture to take the idea of an Independent Agricultural Parliamentary Party under serious consideration. The resolution was sent to all the agricultural chambers and was adopted by the Canterbury, Lincolnshire, Monmouthshire, Totnes and Worcestershire Chambers as well as the Chester, Holderness, Liverpool and Wadhurst Farmers' Clubs.

On 26 June 1907, the resolution formed the centre of discussion for a meeting of Secretaries of the various agricultural chambers. They concluded that they were "strongly of opinion that an Independent Agricultural Party is absolutely necessary and could be formed." On 5 November 1907, the Organisational Committee of the Central Chamber of Agriculture produced a report that concluded that they were "strongly of opinion that the value of such a party as that proposed depends far more on its absolute independence and singleness of aim than on its numerical strength, and recommend that the efforts to establish it shall at first be concentrated on those constituencies whence it would be possible to secure a thoroughly compact and reliable body." Jesse Collings supported the report, as in his opinion Parliament was dominated by commercialism and without organisation the representation of agriculture was useless.

An Agricultural Representation Committee of the Central Chamber of Agriculture produced a similar report on the matter 5 May 1908, coming to the same conclusion that parliamentary representation was necessary. However, the opposition of a small number of members of the Central Chamber of Agriculture meant that a section of paragraph 9 of the Agricultural Representation Committee's report was deleted. This paragraph detailed how a Special Standing Committee, separate to the Chamber, would work to create an Agricultural Party. Following the deletion of this section, the resolution was passed 49 votes to 6. However, the succeeding years the resolution was all but forgotten as members of the Central Chamber of Agriculture turned their attention to national political happenings.

In October 1923, the idea of an agricultural or rural political party was revived by the prominent agriculturalist Christopher Hatton Turnor at a meeting of the Grantham Farmers' Union. This revival was continued by Sir Herbert Matthews, Secretary of the Central Chamber of Agriculture. It was agreed that the Honorary Secretary of the Party would be Sir Herbert Matthews and the Honorary Treasurer would be Mr George Cooper, a Warwickshire farmer and agricultural writer. In January 1924, Sir Herbert Matthews set out the parliamentary programme for the party.

1. The maximum economic production from the maximum employment on the land.
2. A living wage and better conditions of life for the rural worker.
3. The organisation of agriculture and its allied industries.
4. A flourishing agriculture, which means prosperity to every rural dweller.

It was announced that the trustees of the party would be Christopher Hatton Turnor and Colonel C. H. Hoare, a member of a well known banking family. The offices of the party were at Westminster Palace Gardens.

== Opposition ==
In January 1924, at a meeting of the Devon Farmers' Union at Exeter, Rowland Richard Robbins, Vice-President of the National Farmers Union, conducted an attack on the idea of a rural or agrarian party. He also rejected the suggestion that landowners, labourers and farmers should unite under a single banner, preferring cooperation when necessary. He asked his audience,

Does the nation want maximum production and maximum employment, or good farming? The two things are not the same; they are essentially different. Good farming is possible without either subsidies or protection. Good farming means farming on safety first principles. It means cutting one's coat according to one's cloth. It means, under existing world conditions, diminished aggregate production and diminished employment.

== See also ==
- Agricultural Party
