= Simon Lucas, 3rd Baron Lucas of Chilworth =

British peer

Simon William Lucas, 3rd Baron Lucas of Chilworth (born 6 February 1957) is a British peer.

Lucas was the eldest son of Michael William George Lucas, 2nd Baron Lucas of Chilworth. He was educated at Churcher's College, the University of Leicester and the Royal Military Academy Sandhurst after which he served with the Royal Engineers.

Coat of arms of Simon Lucas, 3rd Baron Lucas of Chilworth
Crest A Representation of Apollo affrontée Or Escutcheon Per fess wavy Or and Azure in chief between two Annulets a Rose Gules barbed and seeded proper and in base two Bars wavy Argent surmounted by a Bull's Head caboshed Sable Supporters Dexter: a Lion Or; Sinister: a Russian Bear Sable, each resting the interior paw upon an Annulet therein a Rose Gules barbed and seeded proper Motto Labor Vincit Omnia (Labour Conquers All)

Peerage of the United Kingdom
Preceded by Michael William George Lucas	Baron Lucas of Chilworth; 2001-present	Incumbent; Heir: John Ronald Muir Lucas
