= Michael Lucas, 2nd Baron Lucas of Chilworth =

British peer and Conservative politician

Michael William George Lucas, 2nd Baron Lucas of Chilworth (26 April 1926 – 10 November 2001), was a British peer and Conservative politician.

== Background and education ==
Lucas was the eldest son of George William Lucas, 1st Baron Lucas of Chilworth, a prominent figure in the motor trade industry and Labour politician, and his wife, the former Sonia Finkelstein, a scion of a family prominent in the Latvian fishing industry. He was educated at Peter Symonds College, Winchester, and at Luton Technical College (now the University of Bedfordshire) where he studied motor engineering. He served with the Royal Tank Regiment after the Second World War and later joined the family car dealership.

== Political career ==
In 1967 Lucas succeeded his father as second Baron Lucas of Chilworth and took his seat on the Conservative benches in the House of Lords. An active member of the House of Lords, he served on the Select Committee on Science and Technology from 1980 to 1983. The latter year he was appointed a Lord-in-waiting (government whip in the House of Lords) in the Conservative government of Margaret Thatcher, and then served as Under-Secretary of State for Trade and Industry between 1984 and 1987. He stepped down from the government after the 1987 general election, but continued to be active in the House of Lords. However, he was forced to leave Parliament after the House of Lords Act 1999, when he narrowly failed to be elected as one of the ninety elected hereditary peers that were allowed to remain in the House of Lords. Apart from his political work, Lucas also served as President of the League of Safe Drivers from 1976 to 1980 and of the Institute of Traffic Management (later the Institute of Transport Administration) from 1980 to 1983.

== Family ==
Lord Lucas of Chilworth married, firstly, Ann Marie, daughter of Ronald William Buck, in 1955. They had two sons and one daughter but were divorced in 1989. She died in 2018. He married, secondly, Jill MacKean, in 1998. Lord Lucas of Chilworth died in November 2001, aged 75, and was succeeded in the barony by his eldest son Simon.

Coat of arms of Michael Lucas, 2nd Baron Lucas of Chilworth
Crest A Representation of Apollo affrontée Or Escutcheon Per fess wavy Or and Azure in chief between two Annulets a Rose Gules barbed and seeded proper and in base two Bars wavy Argent surmounted by a Bull's Head caboshed Sable Supporters Dexter: a Lion Or; Sinister: a Russian Bear Sable, each resting the interior paw upon an Annulet therein a Rose Gules barbed and seeded proper Motto Labor Vincit Omnia (Labour Conquers All)

Political offices
Preceded by David Trippier	Under-Secretary of State for Trade and Industry; 1984–1987	Succeeded by Michael Howard
Peerage of the United Kingdom
Preceded by George William Lucas	Baron Lucas of Chilworth; 1967–2001	Succeeded by Simon William Lucas
