= Distribution of Industry Act 1950 =

Act of the Parliament of the United Kingdom

Distribution of Industry Act 1950 (Note: Section 6(1).)
- Act of Parliament
- Parliament of the United Kingdom
- Long title: An Act to make further provision for the acquisition of land, creation of easements and carrying out of work in development areas; to authorise the Board of Trade to make grants in exceptional cases in connection with the establishment in, or transfer to, development areas of industrial undertakings, and to make grants or loans to housing associations for the provision of dwellings in development areas; and to extend section five of the Employment and Training Act, 1948, in relation to persons transferred for employment in industrial undertakings established in, or transferred to, development areas.
- Citation: 14 Geo. 6. c. 8
- Territorial extent: United Kingdom

Dates
- Royal assent: 12 July 1950
- Commencement: 12 July 1950 (Note: The Acts of Parliament (Commencement) Act 1793.)
- Repealed: 1 April 1960 (Note: The Local Employment Act 1960 (Commencement) Order 1960 (SI 1960/562).)
Other legislation
Amends	Distribution of Industry Act 1945
Repealed by	Local Employment Act 1960
Relates to	Employment and Training Act 1948

Status: Repealed

Text of statute as originally enacted

The Distribution of Industry Act 1950 (14 Geo. 6. c. 8) was an act of the Parliament of the United Kingdom by the Labour government of Clement Attlee. It strengthened the powers of the Board of Trade in the Development Areas, making "further provision for the acquisition of land, creation of easements and carrying out of work in development areas." The act also authorised "the Board of Trade "to make grants, in exceptional cases in connection with the establishment in, or transfer to, development areas of industrial undertakings, and to make grants or loans to housing associations for the provision of dwellings in development areas." In addition, the act also provided for payments towards the cost of removal and resettlement of key workers and their dependants.

== Subsequent developments ==
The whole act was repealed by section 28(1) of, and the third schedule to, the Local Employment Act 1960 (8 & 9 Eliz. 2. c. 18), which came into force on 1 April 1960. Section 28(6) of that act preserved the continued payment of grants to housing associations that the board had agreed to make under section 3(2) of the 1950 act for dwellings provided before the commencement of the 1960 act.
