= Coal-Mining (Subsidence) Act 1950 =

Act of the Parliament of the United Kingdom

Coal-Mining (Subsidence) Act 1950 (Note: Section 18(1).)
- Act of Parliament
- Parliament of the United Kingdom
- Long title: An Act to provide for the carrying out of repairs and the making of payments in respect of damage affecting certain dwelling-houses and caused by subsidence resulting from the working and getting of coal and other minerals worked with coal, and for the execution of works to prevent or reduce such damage; and for purposes connected with the matters aforesaid.
- Citation: 14 Geo. 6. c. 23
- Territorial extent: England and Wales; Scotland; (Note: Section 18(2).)

Dates
- Royal assent: 28 July 1950
- Commencement: 28 July 1950 (Note: The Acts of Parliament (Commencement) Act 1793.)
- Repealed: 18 July 1973
Other legislation
Repealed by	Statute Law (Repeals) Act 1973

Status: Repealed

Text of statute as originally enacted

The Coal-Mining (Subsidence) Act 1950 (14 Geo. 6. c. 23) was an act of the Parliament of the United Kingdom by the Labour government of Clement Attlee. The act established a scheme to provide relief for residents whose dwellinghouses had been damaged by subsidence.

== Subsequent developments ==
The whole act was repealed by section 1(1) of, and part X of schedule 1 to, the Statute Law (Repeals) Act 1973, which came into force on 18 July 1973.
