= Parliamentary Secretary to the Ministry of Transport =

Parliamentary Secretary to the Ministry of Transport was a junior position at the British Ministry of Transport. The office was renamed Parliamentary Secretary to the Ministry of War Transport in 1941, but resumed its former name at the end of the Second World War.

== Parliamentary Secretaries to the Ministry of Transport, 1924–41 ==
- John Moore-Brabazon 11 November 1924 – 14 January 1927
- vacant 14 January 1927 – 4 June 1929
- John Russell, 2nd Earl Russell 11 June 1929 – 1 December 1929
- Arthur Ponsonby 1 December 1929 – 1 March 1931
- John Allen Parkinson 1 March 1931 – 24 August 1931
- George Gillett 4 September 1931 – 25 November 1931
- Ivor Miles Windsor-Clive, 2nd Earl of Plymouth 25 November 1931 – 29 September 1932
- Cuthbert Headlam 29 September 1932 – 5 July 1934
- vacant 5 July 1934 – 18 June 1935
- Austin Hudson 18 June 1935 – 14 July 1939
- Robert Bernays 14 July 1939 – 18 May 1940
- Frederick Montague 18 May 1940 – 1 May 1941

== Parliamentary Secretary to the Ministry of War Transport, 1941–45 ==
- John Jestyn Llewellin 1 May 1941 – 4 February 1942
- Sir Arthur Salter 29 June 1941 – 4 February 1942
- Philip Noel-Baker, 4 February 1942 – 26 May 1945
- Peter Thorneycroft, 26 May 1945 – 26 July 1945

== Parliamentary Secretaries to the Ministry of Transport, 1945–70 ==
- George Strauss 4 August 1945 – 7 October 1947
- James Callaghan 7 October 1947 – 2 March 1950
- George William Lucas, 1st Baron Lucas of Chilworth 2 March 1950 – 26 October 1951
- Joseph Gurney Braithwaite 5 November 1951 – 1 November 1953
- Reginald Maudling 18 April 1952 – 24 November 1952
- John Profumo 24 November 1952 – 9 January 1957
- Hugh Molson 11 November 1953 – 9 January 1957
- Richard Nugent 18 January 1957 – 22 October 1959
- Airey Neave 18 January 1957 – 16 January 1959
- John Hay 16 January 1959 – 3 May 1963
- John Charles Compton Cavendish, 5th Baron Chesham 22 October 1959 – 16 October 1964
- John Hughes-Hallett 26 April 1961 – 16 October 1964
- Tam Galbraith 3 May 1963 – 16 October 1964
- George Lindgren, Baron Lindgren 20 October 1964 – 10 January 1966
- Stephen Swingler 20 October 1964 – 29 August 1967
- John Morris 10 January 1966 – 6 April 1968
- Neil George Carmichael 29 August 1967 – 13 October 1969
- Robert Brown 6 April 1968 – 19 June 1970
- Albert Murray 13 October 1969 – 19 June 1970
- Michael Heseltine 24 June 1970 – 15 October 1970
