= Institute of Transport Administration =

Professional transport management association

- Abbreviation: IoTA
- Established: 1944
- Type: Professional Association
- Professional title: Transport Manager
- Headquarters: The Training Centre; 6 Gateshead Close; Sandy; Bedfordshire SG19 1RS
- Region served: Worldwide
- Services: Professional Accreditation; Drivers CPC Consortium; Quality Assurance
- Key people: A J Whittington, President; R A Rowsell, Deputy President
- Website: www.iota.org.uk

The Institute of Transport Administration (IoTA) is an international professional association for individuals who work in transport management, including road, rail, sea and air. It was founded in 1944.

Headquartered in Sandy, Hertfordshire, United Kingdom, the IoTA operates in the United Kingdom, and also has overseas members. It is recognised by the UK Department for Transport and the Traffic Commissioners.

== Activities ==
IoTA's main role and function is dedication to training and education, ensuring that those active in transport management and administration are kept up to date with current legislation and requirements of the various statutory bodies. Most of its work concentrates on road transport, both freight and passenger.

It runs a Training Consortium, which is authorised by the government's DVSA Training Accreditation (previously an arm's-length body called JAUPT) to conduct Driver Certificate of Professional Competence (DCPC) training. This must be undertaken by every lorry, bus and coach driver in order for them to retain their qualification with one day's training once a year. Legislation permits DCPC to be postponed, but by the end of the fifth year all 35-hours training must be complete, or the licence is not renewed.

Also offered is Operator Licence Awareness Training aimed at Company Directors, Partners and Proprietors and provides an overview of Operator Licence requirements to re-affirm the undertakings given to the Traffic Commissioner when applying for an ‘O’ Licence. IoTA is a body recognised by the Traffic Commissioners to deliver this training.

The Consortium also provides Fleet Operator Compliance Audit services which meet the requirements of the relevant competent authorities.

== History ==
The IoTA was founded in 1944 as The Institute of Traffic Administration . It was registered as a Friendly Society on 25 July 1944 under society number 53SA.

On 29 January 1981 the IoTA renamed itself as The Institute of Transport Administration. In 1977, the UK Secretary of State for Transport designated the Institute as an "Approved Body" under the Public Service Vehicle Operators (Qualifications) Regulations 1977 and Goods Vehicle Operators (Qualifications) Regulations 1977, This enabled the IoTA to issue CPC Exemption Certificates to Corporate Members engaged in road transport operations.

With effect from 5 December 2011 "Approved Body" status was withdrawn from all organisations holding it. Exemption Certificates issued by the IoTA before that date continue to be valid though.

== Governance ==
=== Trustees ===
The IoTA's property is held by a body of Trustees. There may be no fewer than three nor more than five them. They must stand for re-election annually and have the right to attend meetings of the National Council, Executive Committee and any of the Institute's National Committees. At any IoTA meeting the Trustees have a single vote as a collective body.

=== National Council ===
The Council directs and controls all the activities of the IoTA, and may frame, amend, alter and revoke any and all bye-laws and standing orders. It consists of representatives elected from the corporate members of each approved Centre. Each centre elects two representatives to serve for a maximum of three years, only one of whom is entitled to vote.

The Council acts through an Executive Committee consisting of six office holders and the IoTA's Director, and three National Committees consisting of a chairman and four other members. The Executive Committee and all of the National Committees have the power of co-option.

=== Executive committee ===
This committee comprises the National Chairman, Deputy President and Chairmen (or nominated deputies) of the National Committees. The Director and President are ex-officio members. Like the National Committees it has the power of co-option.

The committee makes all urgent decisions between Council meetings, within the policies outlined by the National Council. A full report of these is submitted to Council at its next meeting.

=== Finance and General Purposes Committee ===
The Committee considers all questions relating to finance and the administration of the IoTA. it is responsible to National Council. The Committee must ensure that the financial management is carried out in accordance with recognised accounting practice and the IoTA Rules. The Committee is responsible for creating an annual budget..

The Committee examines the audited accounts and grant applications from Centres each year, approves and advises Centres of annual grant awards, determines the salary levels of all paid officers and staff.. It also presents an annual recommendation to the National Council concerning subscription levels for the forthcoming year.

This Committee is responsible for updating the IoTA Rules of the IoTA and Centre Handbook are kept up with proposed amendments going to the Executive Councile

=== External Affairs Committee ===
The committee considers all transport industry topics that would interest the IoTA and Its membership. The Committee performs public relations activities for IoTA.

The Committee also publishes the IoTAs Official Journal and an updates the IoTA website. It also advises National Council and the Centres on all public relations concerns. Liaison Officers for both Scotland and Wales are co-opted members of this committee.

=== Education, Training and Membership Committee ===
The Committee works to increase IoTA membership. It is responsible for keeping abreast of educational developments and assessing their effects upon the educational and training needs of IoTA members. The Committee works with the Director in developing and promoting an education and training policy..

This committee is responsible for overseeing the IoTA's Operator Licensing Awareness Training (OLAT), Transport Managers Refresher (TMR), Fleet Accreditation Scheme (FAS) as well as the Certificate in Transport Management (CTM).

=== President, Deputy President and Director ===
The positions of President and Deputy-President are held by elected senior Members or Fellows of IoTA. These posts are largely ceremonial, although the President acts as chairman of the Executive Committee.

==== Past Presidents and Deputy Presidents ====
From	To	President	From	To	Deputy-President
1944	1953	Sir Herbert Matthews	-	-	-
1953	1970	The Lord Merrivale of Walkhampton	-	-	-
1970	1973	Frank N Wright, FInstTA	-	-	-
1973	1974	The Lord Montagu of Beaulieu	-	-	-
1974	1980	H C Grace, JP, FInstTA	-	-	-
1980	1981	The Lord Lucas of Chilworth	1980	1981	B G Bowen
1981	1983	The Lord Lucas of Chilworth	1982	1983	Vacant
1983	1987	The Lord Marshall of Leeds	1983	1987	J Derek Bailey, FInstTA
1987	1990	The Lord Teviot	1988	1990	J Derek Bailey, FInstTA
1990	1991	J Derek Bailey, FInstTA	1990	1991	Vacant
1992	1993	J Derek Bailey, FInstTA	1992	1993	Colin Thompson, FInstTA
1993	1994	John Telford-Beasley, CBE, FInstTA	1993	1994	J Derek Bailey, FInstTA
1994	1999	John Telford-Beasley, CBE, FInstTA	1993	1999	Colin Thompson, FInstTA
1999	2002	Donald McCuish, FInstTA	2000	2002	Colin Thompson, FInstTA
2002	2006	Donald McCuish, FInstTA	2002	2005	Firth Derbyshire, FInstTA
2006	2007	Dr Michael Asteris, PhD	2005	2007	Firth Derbyshire, FInstTA
2007	2009	Dr Michael Asteris, PhD	2007	2009	Alan Whittington, FInstTA
2009	2016	Wg Cdr Peter Green, FInstTA	2009	2016	Alan Whittington, FInstTA
2016	present	Alan Whittington, FInstTA	2016	present	Ray Rowsell, FInstTA
