= Chamber of Agriculture =

British agricultural organisation

The Central Chamber of Agriculture and Associated Chambers of Agriculture, amalgamated into a single association as the Central and Associated Chambers of Agriculture, was an agricultural pressure group in the United Kingdom.

The first chamber was founded in Scotland in 1864, and this was followed by a British association in 1866, in response to the Cattle Plague of 1865. An early influence on the chambers was the Liberal politician Thomas Duckham, who also pressed Gladstone to set up a Ministry of Agriculture, which was created as the Board of Agriculture in 1889. In the late 19th and early 20th centuries, the Chambers of Agriculture had considerable influence on legislation regarding diseases in livestock, agricultural tenancies, the game laws, and railway rates for transporting agricultural produce.
