= Employment and Training Act 1948 =

Act of the Parliament of the United Kingdom

Employment and Training Act 1948 (Note: Section 22(1).)
- Act of Parliament
- Parliament of the United Kingdom
- Long title: An Act to make fresh provision with respect to the functions of the Minister of Labour and National Service relating to employment and training for employment; to provide for the establishment of a comprehensive youth employment service; to consolidate with amendments certain enactments relating to the matters aforesaid; and for purposes connected therewith.
- Citation: 11 & 12 Geo. 6. c. 46
- Territorial extent: England and Wales; Scotland; Northern Ireland (exept section 20); (Note: Section 22(2).)

Dates
- Royal assent: 13 July 1948
- Commencement: 13 July 1948 (Note: The Acts of Parliament (Commencement) Act 1793.)
- Repealed: 16 May 1975 (Note: The Employment and Training Act 1973 (Commencement No. 4) Order 1975 (SI 1975/689).)

Other legislation
- Amended by: Statute Law Revision Act 1963
- Repealed by: Employment and Training Act 1973

Status: Repealed

Text of statute as originally enacted

The Employment and Training Act 1948 (11 & 12 Geo. 6. c. 46) was an act of the Parliament of the United Kingdom by the Labour government of Clement Attlee. This legislation became the legal foundation for the post-war employment service under the Ministry of Labour. Every worker (regardless of whether he or she was in employment) was encouraged to register if he or she wanted a new job. It also established a Youth Employment Service to help find work opportunities for school-leavers. Under the act, as noted by David Peck, the Minister of Labour and National Service was to provide: "Such facilities and services as he considers expedient for the purpose of assisting persons to select, fit themselves for, obtain and retain employment suitable to their age and capacity, of assisting employers to obtain suitable employees, and generally for the purpose of promoting employment in accordance with the requirements of the community."
