= Aberdare (disambiguation) =

Aberdare is a town in Wales.

Aberdare may also refer to:

== People ==
- Baron Aberdare:
  - Henry Bruce, 1st Baron Aberdare (1815-1895), British politician
  - Henry Bruce, 2nd Baron Aberdare (1851-1929), British soldier
  - Clarence Bruce, 3rd Baron Aberdare (1885-1957), British soldier, cricketer and tennis player
  - Morys Bruce, 4th Baron Aberdare (1919-2005), British politician
  - Alastair Bruce, 5th Baron Aberdare (born 1947)

== Places ==
- Aberdare (UK Parliament constituency)
- Aberdare, New South Wales
- Aberdare Athletic F.C.
- Aberdare Boys' Comprehensive School
- Aberdare Boys' Grammar School
- Aberdare railway station
- Aberdare Park
- Aberdare Hall, Cardiff University, Wales
- Aberdare National Park, Kenya
- Aberdare Range, Kenya

== Other uses ==
- HMS Aberdare (J49), a Royal Navy minesweeper
- GWR 2600 or Aberdare Class steam locomotives
