= Arthur Peters =

Arthur Peters may refer to:

- Arthur Peters (Canadian politician) (1854–1908), Canadian politician
- Arthur Peters (bishop) (1935–2026), Canadian Anglican bishop
- Arthur Peters (British politician) (1867–1956), British politician
- Arthur Peters (Australian cricketer) (1872–1903), Australian cricketer
- Arthur Peters (South African cricketer) (1904-1988), South African cricketer
- Arthur Peters (Royal Navy officer) (1888–1979), British Royal Navy officer
