= George Hennessy, 1st Baron Windlesham =

British politician

The Right Honourable The Lord Windlesham OBE
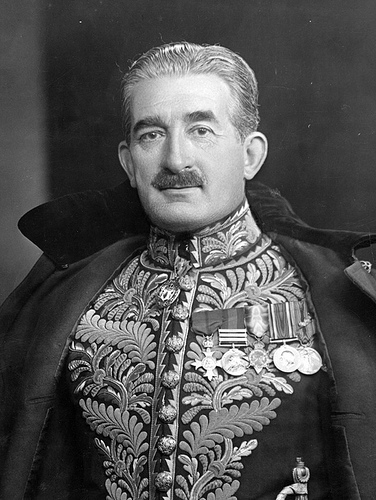

Member of Parliament for Winchester

Personal details
- Born: George Richard James Hennessy; 23 March 1877 Château de Bagnolet, Cognac, France
- Died: 8 October 1953 (aged 76)
- Party: Conservative

George Richard James Hennessy, 1st Baron Windlesham, OBE (23 March 1877 – 8 October 1953) was a British soldier and Conservative politician.

Hennessy, a Franco-Irish aristocrat, served in the First World War as a Major in the King's Royal Rifle Corps and on the Staff of the 8th Division. In 1918 he was elected to parliament for Winchester, a seat he held until 1931, and served under Bonar Law and Baldwin as a Junior Lord of the Treasury from 1922 to 1924 and from 1924 to 1925, as Vice-Chamberlain of the Household from 1925 to 1928 and as Treasurer of the Household from 1928 to 1929. Hennessy held the latter position also from September to November 1931 in the National Government of Ramsay MacDonald. From 1931 to 1941 he was Vice-Chairman of the Conservative and Unionist Party. Hennessy was created a Baronet, of Windlesham in the County of Surrey, in 1927, and on 22 February 1937 he was raised to the peerage as Baron Windlesham, of Windlesham in Surrey.

Windlesham was born in France, the son of Richard Hennessy and Marthe (née Hennessy). His parents were first cousins, both from the Franco-Irish Hennessy family of Cognac fame. His parents separated and his mother moved to England with her children. Marthe Hennessy eventually remarried in 1888 with Lord James Sholto Douglas (1855–1891), youngest brother of the Marquess of Queensberry.

Family ties with the French branches were maintained but economic interests in the cognac business were discontinued by family arrangement. Windlesham married Ethel Mary Wynter, daughter of Charles Reginald Wynter, in 1898. He died in October 1953, aged 76, and was succeeded in the baronetcy and barony by his eldest son, James Hennessy, a brigadier in the Grenadier Guards. The latter's son, David Hennessy, 3rd Baron Windlesham, was also a Conservative politician.

== Arms ==
Coat of arms of George Hennessy, 1st Baron Windlesham
Crest In front of a dexter arm embowed in armour the hand grasping a battle-axe a trefoil slipped and a red rose stalked and saltirewise all Proper. Escutcheon Gules a boar passant Proper on a chief Or a trefoil slipped Vert between two roses of the field barbed and seeded also Proper. Supporters On either side an officer of the Irish Brigade in the service of the King of France in the 18th century Proper the dexter supporting with the exterior hand a gold mounted and tasselled staff Proper. Motto Vi Vivo Et Armis

== See also ==
- Ó hAonghusa

Parliament of the United Kingdom
Preceded by Douglas Carnegie	Member of Parliament for Winchester; 1918 – 1931	Succeeded by Robert Ellis
Political offices
Preceded by Douglas Hacking	Vice-Chamberlain of the Household; 1925–1928	Succeeded by Frederick Charles Thomson
Preceded by George Gibbs	Treasurer of the Household; 1928–1929	Succeeded by Ben Smith
Preceded by Ben Smith	Treasurer of the Household; 1931	Succeeded by Sir Frederick Charles Thomson
Peerage of the United Kingdom
New creation	Baron Windlesham; 1937–1953	Succeeded by James Bryan George Hennessy
Baronetage of the United Kingdom
New creation	Baronet (of Windlesham); 1927–1953	Succeeded by James Bryan George Hennessy
