= George Shepherd, 1st Baron Shepherd =

British politician

The Right Honourable The Lord Shepherd PC
- George Robert Shepherd, 1st Baron Shepherd and his wife, Ada

Chief Whip of the House of Lords Captain of the Honourable Corps of Gentlemen-at-Arms
- In office 18 October 1949 – 5 November 1951
- Prime Minister: Clement Attlee
- Preceded by: The Lord Ammon
- Succeeded by: The Earl Fortescue

Deputy Chief Whip of the House of Lords Captain of the Yeomen of the Guard
- In office 6 July 1949 – 18 October 1949
- Prime Minister: Clement Attlee
- Preceded by: The Lord Walkden
- Succeeded by: The Lord Lucas of Chilworth

Lord-in-waiting Government Whip
- In office 14 October 1948 – 6 July 1949
- Prime Minister: Clement Attlee
- Preceded by: The Lord Lucas of Chilworth
- Succeeded by: The Lord Kershaw

Member of the House of Lords Lord Temporal
- In office 28 June 1946 – 4 December 1954; Hereditary Peerage
- Preceded by: Peerage created
- Succeeded by: The 2nd Lord Shepherd

Personal details
- Born: George Robert Shepherd; 19 August 1881
- Died: 4 December 1954 (aged 73)
- Party: Labour
- Spouse: Ada Newton (m. 1915)
- Children: 2

George Robert Shepherd, 1st Baron Shepherd PC (19 August 1881 – 4 December 1954), was a British Labour politician.

== Early life ==
Shepherd was the son of George Robert Shepherd, a tailor of Spalding, Lincolnshire. Shepherd began working as an assistant to a cobbler in Bradford, joining a union and, in 1903, also joining the Independent Labour Party (ILP). From 1908, he spent a year working as the full-time ILP organiser for the Midlands, and was then appointed as an agent for the Labour Party in Dundee, where he was election agent for Alexander Wilkie. In 1913, he moved to Blackburn, to serve as agent for Philip Snowden.

He did not serve in the First World War, being a conscientious objector.

== Career ==
In 1920, Shepherd became Labour Party District Organiser for the London and Southern area. He served as Assistant National Agent for from 1924 to 1929 and National Agent from 1929 to 1946. This meant he was in charge of the Labour Party agents nationwide at the landslide election victory which brought Clement Attlee to No. 10. When Sir Winston Churchill requested that Clement Attlee and the Labour Party enter into a wartime coalition, he negotiated the terms of the coalition agreement with George Shepherd.

=== House of Lords ===
On 28 June 1946 he was raised to the peerage as Baron Shepherd, of Spalding in the County of Lincoln, becoming one of the few Labour peers in the House of Lords. Shepherd then served in the Labour administration of Clement Attlee as a Lord-in-waiting (government whip) from 1948 to 1949, as Captain of the Yeomen of the Guard (Deputy Chief Whip in the House of Lords) in 1949 and as Captain of the Honourable Corps of Gentlemen-at-Arms (Chief Whip in the House of Lords) from 1949 to 1951. The latter year he was also sworn of the Privy Council.

== Personal life ==
In 1915, he married Ada Newton. She was an active trade unionist and campaigner for women's rights who was supported by the Quaker families of Cadbury, Fry and Rowntree in fighting for a living wage for women. They had a son and a daughter, Margaret who died in 2015.

Lord Shepherd died in December 1954, aged 73, and was succeeded in the barony by his only son Malcolm, who also became a prominent Labour politician and held many of the same offices as George Shepherd.

Party political offices
Preceded by Egerton P. Wake	Labour Party National Agent; 1929 – 1946	Succeeded by Richard T. Windle
Political offices
Preceded by The Lord Walkden	Captain of the Yeomen of the Guard; 1949	Succeeded by The Lord Lucas of Chilworth
Preceded by The Lord Ammon	Captain of the Honourable Corps of Gentlemen-at-Arms; 1949–1951	Succeeded by The Earl Fortescue
Peerage of the United Kingdom
New creation	Baron Shepherd; 1946–1954	Succeeded by Malcolm Newton Shepherd
