= Malcolm Shepherd, 2nd Baron Shepherd =

British politician (1918–2001)

The Right Honourable The Lord Shepherd PC
- Shepherd in 1968

Leader of the House of Lords Lord Keeper of the Privy Seal
- In office 4 March 1974 – 10 September 1976
- Prime Minister: Harold Wilson; James Callaghan
- Preceded by: The Lord Windlesham
- Succeeded by: The Lord Peart

Deputy Leader of the House of Lords
- In office February 1968 – June 1970
- Prime Minister: Harold Wilson
- Leader: The Lord Shackleton
- Preceded by: The Lord Shackleton
- Succeeded by: The Lord Aberdare

Minister of State for Foreign and Commonwealth Affairs
- In office 17 October 1968 – 19 June 1970
- Prime Minister: Harold Wilson
- Preceded by: Goronwy Roberts
- Succeeded by: Joseph Godber

Minister of State for Commonwealth Affairs
- In office 26 July 1967 – 17 October 1968
- Prime Minister: Harold Wilson
- Preceded by: Judith Hart
- Succeeded by: Office abolished

Chief Whip of the House of Lords Captain of the Honourable Corps of Gentlemen-at-Arms
- In office 21 October 1964 – 29 July 1967
- Prime Minister: Harold Wilson
- Preceded by: The Earl St Aldwyn
- Succeeded by: The Lord Beswick

Member of the House of Lords
- Lord Temporal
- Hereditary peerage 4 December 1954 – 11 November 1999
- Preceded by: The 1st Baron Shepherd
- Succeeded by: Seat abolished
- Life peerage 16 November 1999 – 5 April 2001

Personal details
- Born: 27 September 1918 Blackburn, Lancashire, England
- Died: 5 April 2001 (aged 82) Lanzarote, Canary Islands
- Party: Labour
- Spouse: Allison Wilson Redmond (m. 1941)
- Children: 2

Malcolm Newton Shepherd, 2nd Baron Shepherd, Baron Shepherd of Spalding (27 September 1918 – 5 April 2001), was a British Labour politician and peer who served as Leader of the House of Lords under Harold Wilson and James Callaghan and member of the Privy Council of the United Kingdom.

Shepherd was the son of the Labour politician George Shepherd, 1st Baron Shepherd. With the House of Lords Act 1999, the right of the hereditary peers of an automatic seat in the House of Lords was removed, so Shepherd was created a life peer as Baron Shepherd of Spalding, of Spalding in the County of Lincolnshire to keep his seat.

== Early life ==
Born in Blackburn, Lancashire, Malcolm Shepherd was educated at the Lower School of John Lyon and the Friends' School, an independent school in the market town of Saffron Walden in Essex. He was commissioned in the Royal Army Service Corps in 1941 and served in North Africa, Sicily and Italy rising to the rank of Captain and transferring to what was known as 'Special Services'. Initially his mother and father were against him joining the Army because of their pacifist convictions.

After the end of the Second World War, Shepherd, together with his wife Allison, went to Singapore as an employee of a British trading company. Later Shepherd purchased majority shares in the firm of Fielding, Brown and Finch working in Malaya and Singapore. When his father died in 1954, he took six months leave, came to the UK to settle his father's affairs and made his maiden speech in the House of Lords before returning to the Far East and resuming his business career. In 1958, his company headquarters moved to London and Shepherd moved himself and his family to the UK.

== Political career ==
Shepherd succeeded to the title of Baron Shepherd of Spalding on the death of his father in December 1954, and took his seat in the House of Lords on 8 March 1955. In 1960 he became Deputy Opposition Chief Whip in the Lords, and became Opposition Chief Whip in 1964.

When Shepherd first joined the House of Lords its membership was entirely composed of hereditary peers with a large inbuilt Conservative Party majority. There were only about 25 to 30 Labour Party peers. Shepherd was a pragmatist who realised that if he was to enable the Bills sent from the House of Commons to pass through the House of Lords he had to do deals with the Conservatives and maintain good relations with all in the House.

Although a moderate in his political views he was an early advocate of House of Lords reform. He thought there was too much unnecessary ceremony and in 1971 argued that those entitled to vote in the Upper House be restricted to regular attenders.

After the Labour victory in the 1964 general election, he became Captain of the Honourable Corps of Gentlemen-at-Arms and Government Chief Whip, House of Lords, a post he held until 1967 when he became Minister of State at the Foreign and Commonwealth Office. He also served as Deputy Leader of the House of Lords from 1968 to 1970.

Shepherd was appointed to the Privy Council in the 1965 Birthday Honours.

As Minister of State at the Foreign and Commonwealth Office, a role that had previously been known as Secretary of State for the Colonies. During his tenure at The Foreign Office, Britain was busy shedding Empire and he was very involved in the new constitutions of colonies becoming independent, including Fiji. Shepherd was also involved in resolving the Caribbean island of Anguilla's demand for independence from St. Christopher-Nevis-Anguilla. He also had to deal with the Biafra war in Nigeria. He won particular popularity in Gibraltar by supervising the introduction of a new constitution which bound Gibraltar more closely to the UK after the Spanish government of General Franco closed the border. Shepherd's preamble to the Gibraltar constitution stated that 'Her Majesty's Government will never enter into arrangements under which the people of Gibraltar will pass under the sovereignty of another state against their wishes.' Within the Colony's population he is commonly known as "The Father of the Constitution". He was also responsible for Hong Kong during the riots of 1967 inspired by the cultural revolution; he maintained a relationship with the territory in the following years.

From 1970 to 1974, Shepherd was Opposition Deputy Leader, House of Lords. In 1974 he became Lord Privy Seal and Leader of the House of Lords, a post he held until he resigned in 1976.

In 1975, Shepherd and his wife Allison accompanied The Queen and Prince Philip on the first state visit to Japan.

In November 1975, Harold Wilson caused controversy within the Labour Party by sending him to represent the UK Government at the funeral of General Franco.

Shepherd remained an active member of the House of Lords for the rest of his life, and on 16 November 1999 he was created a life peer as Baron Shepherd of Spalding, of Spalding in the County of Lincolnshire in order to keep his seat after the House of Lords Act removed the right of hereditary peers to an automatic seat in the House.

== Business career ==
After the surprise defeat of Harold Wilson's Labour government in the 1970 general election, Shepherd worked for Rudy Sternberg's Sterling Group.

He returned to an active career in business after resigning from the Cabinet in 1976 and also held a number of public offices.

Shepherd was the first Chairman of the Civil Service Pay Research Unit board from 1978 to 1981. He served on the Packaging Council from 1978 to 1980. He was chairman of the Medical Research Council from 1978 to 1982.

From 1976 to 1986 he was Deputy Chairman of Rudi Sternberg's, later to become Lord Plurenden, Sterling Group of Companies. In 1979 he became chairman of the National Bus Company which was then one of the largest nationalised industries. Shepherd oversaw a large rise in its profits which reached £48m by 1984. He tried to persuade the Conservative government not to privatise the company, warned of the disappearance of loss-making rural services and frequently clashed with the Transport Secretary Nicholas Ridley.

He was President of the Centre Européen de l'Entreprise Publique from 1985 and of the Institute of Road Transport Engineers.

== Family ==
In 1941, Shepherd married Allison Wilson Redmond (died 1998), the sister of broadcaster James Redmond. Their two sons, Graeme and Douglas, were born in Singapore before he succeeded to the title.

He was on holiday in Lanzarote (with his Whip's permission), where he died suddenly on 5 April 2001. His elder son Graeme inherited the hereditary title. He is buried together with his wife, Allison, in Muiravonside Cemetery in Falkirk, Scotland.

== Sources ==
- The Independent, 7 April 2001 (obituary)
- The Guardian, 6 April 2001 (obituary)
- The Times (obituary)
- The Daily Telegraph (obituary)
- Who's Who 1999

Political offices
Preceded by The Earl St Aldwyn	Chief Whip of the House of Lords; 1964–1967	Succeeded by The Lord Beswick
Preceded by The Earl St Aldwyn	Captain of the Honourable Corps of Gentlemen-at-Arms; 1964–1967	Succeeded by The Lord Beswick
Preceded by The Lord Shackleton	Deputy Leader of the House of Lords; 1968–1970	Succeeded by The Lord Aberdare
Preceded by The Lord Windlesham	Leader of the House of Lords; 1974–1976	Succeeded by The Lord Peart
Preceded by The Lord Windlesham	Lord Privy Seal; 1974–1976	Succeeded by The Lord Peart
Party political offices
Preceded by The Lord Shackleton	Leader of the Labour Party in the House of Lords; 1974–1976	Succeeded by The Lord Peart
Peerage of the United Kingdom
Preceded by George Robert Shepherd	Baron Shepherd; 1954–2001	Succeeded by Graeme George Shepherd
