= Baron Windlesham =

Barony in the Peerage of the United Kingdom

Baron Windlesham, of Windlesham in Surrey, is a title in the Peerage of the United Kingdom. It was created in 1937 for the Conservative politician Sir George Hennessy, 1st Baronet. He had already been created a Baronet, of Winchester in the County of Southampton, in 1927. His eldest son, the second Baron, was a Brigadier in the Grenadier Guards. The latter's son, the third Baron, succeeded in 1962; a Conservative politician, he notably served as Lord Privy Seal and Leader of the House of Lords in 1974. In 1999 he was created a life peer as Baron Hennessy, of Windlesham in the County of Surrey, so that he could continue to sit in the House of Lords after the passing of the House of Lords Act 1999, which removed the automatic right of hereditary peers to a seat in the upper chamber of parliament. As of 2015 the titles are held by his son, the fourth Baron.

== Barons Windlesham (1937) ==
- George Richard James Hennessy, 1st Baron Windlesham (1877–1953)
- James Bryan George Hennessy, 2nd Baron Windlesham (1903–1962)
- David James George Hennessy, 3rd Baron Windlesham (1932–2010)
- James Rupert Hennessy, 4th Baron Windlesham (b. 1968)

The heir apparent is the present holder's son Hon. George Rupert James Hennessy (b. 2006)

=== Line of Succession ===
- George Richard James Hennessy, 1st Baron Windlesham (1877—1953)
  - James Bryan George Hennessy, 2nd Baron Windlesham (1903—1962)
    - David James George Hennessy, 3rd Baron Windlesham, Baron Hennessy (1932—2010)
      - James Rupert Hennessy, 4th Baron Windlesham (born 1968)
        - (1) Hon. George Rupert James Hennessy (b. 2006)
  - Hon. Frederick Francis George Hennessy (1906—1969)
    - Peter Grant Auguste Hennessy (1944—2019)
      - (2) James George Hennessy (b. 1970)
      - (3) Benedict John Hennessy (b. 1978)

== Arms ==
Coat of arms of Baron Windlesham
Crest In front of a dexter arm embowed in armour the hand grasping a battle-axe a trefoil slipped and a red rose stalked and saltirewise all Proper. Escutcheon Gules a boar passant Proper on a chief Or a trefoil slipped Vert between two roses of the field barbed and seeded also Proper. Supporters On either side an officer of the Irish Brigade in the service of the King of France in the 18th century Proper the dexter supporting with the exterior hand a gold mounted and tasselled staff Proper. Motto Vi Vivo Et Armis
