= Egerton Wake =

Political party official

Egerton Percival Wake (1871 – March 1929) was a prominent official in the British Labour Party.

Born in Chatham in Kent, Wake trained as a law clerk and an accountant. He joined the Independent Labour Party (ILP) in the 1890s, and became chair of its Lancashire Divisional Council, while also serving on its National Committee.

The ILP supported the Labour Party, and in 1908, Wake moved Barrow-in-Furness to act as the Labour Party agent and organiser there and, supported by money from the Amalgamated Society of Engineers, he turned it into a model party. He opposed the First World War, and served as a commissioner of the Union of Democratic Control. He was selected by the ILP as their candidate in Stockton-on-Tees for the general election expected in 1914 or 1915, but after the Labour Party sponsored an ILP candidate in nearby Bishop Auckland, Wake decided there was no chance of obtained its backing himself, and so withdrew. During this period, he also served as a councillor in Barrow.

In 1918, Wake was appointed as the party's national Organisational Secretary, reorganising the Scottish and Welsh sections of the party. In October 1919, he was given the vacant post of National Agent, in which he worked closely with Arthur Henderson to centralise the party, while also organising regional conferences.

Wake died in March 1929.

Party political offices
Preceded by Tom Fox	Trades councils representative on the National Executive Committee of the Labour Party; 1914–1918	Succeeded by Committee reorganised
Preceded by Arthur Peters	Labour Party National Agent; 1919 – 1929	Succeeded by George Shepherd
