= James Redmond (broadcaster) =

British broadcasting engineer

Sir James Redmond
- Born: November 8, 1918; Burnbridge, Muiravonside, near Linlithgow, Scotland
- Died: 17 October 1999
- Alma mater: Graeme High School, Falkirk; Caledonian Wireless College, Edinburgh
- Spouse: Joan Morris

Sir James Redmond (8 November 1918 – 17 October 1999) was a British engineer. One of the pioneers of modern public service broadcasting in the United Kingdom, he spent the greater part of his career with the Engineering Department of the BBC (British Broadcasting Corporation) rising all the way through the ranks from vision mixer to Director of Engineering and was involved in overseeing most of the technical developments which made modern television broadcasting possible. He was one of the engineers responsible for the successful development of live outside broadcasting, satellite transmission, 625 line television and colour television as well as the birth of the Eurovision Network and the Open University.

== Biography ==
The son of an Irish railwayman and a Scottish miner's daughter, Jim Redmond was born in Burnbridge, Muiravonside near Linlithgow. He was educated at Graeme High School, Falkirk and the Caledonian Wireless College, Edinburgh before going to sea at the age of seventeen as a wireless operator with the Marconi Company. Tired of constant travel, he spent a brief spell with the Post Office Engineering Department and the BBC in Edinburgh before joining the new television service at Alexandra Palace, London in 1937 as a vision mixer under the direction of Thornton 'Tony' Bridgewater.

When the Second World War broke out he returned to the Merchant Navy as a wireless operator and spent two years on hazardous convoy duty with the Blue Funnel Line before transferring to a shore job in Birkenhead supervising the maintenance and repair of ships' radio and radar equipment. Although Redmond was not an actor, the Crown Film Unit director Pat Jackson cast him as a radio operator in the acclaimed Technicolor drama-documentary Western Approaches which was released in 1944.

He married Joan Morris, a secretary at the Blue Funnel Line in 1942. After the war they returned to London and settled first in Muswell Hill and then Highgate. They had two children. His sister Allison married Malcolm Shepherd who became Baron Shepherd of Spalding a prominent British Labour Party politician.

Redmond returned to the BBC at the war's end and rose steadily through the ranks. He took part in the coverage of the Festival of Britain in 1951, the Coronation of Queen Elizabeth II in 1953 and the Oxford and Cambridge University Boat Race. He was a senior engineer in the Planning and Installation Department in the 1950s before becoming Senior Superintendent Engineer Television in 1963, Assistant Director of Engineering in 1967 and succeeding Sir Francis McLean as Director of Engineering in 1968.

As Senior Superintendent Engineer, he was responsible for the construction of new transmitters to spread the television network across the UK. In 1963 he spent some time in Tokyo, Japan preparing the broadcasting of the following year's Olympic Games. From 1964 he served on the committee that advised the BBC on establishing television channel BBC2. This involved resolving a number of complicated technical problems. The new channel was to be broadcast on 625 lines instead of the old 405 line system and had to be ready to accommodate the impending switch from black and white to colour. Programmes had to be capable of being viewed on either the old 405 line or new 625 line sets. To make matters worse both channels had to be able to broadcast US-made programmes which were made using an altogether different system and which were already transmitted in a crude colour system which Redmond derided as 'Mickey Mouse'. The technical problems were overcome by the opening night of BBC2 in 1964 but the opening was wrecked by a power cut throughout central London.

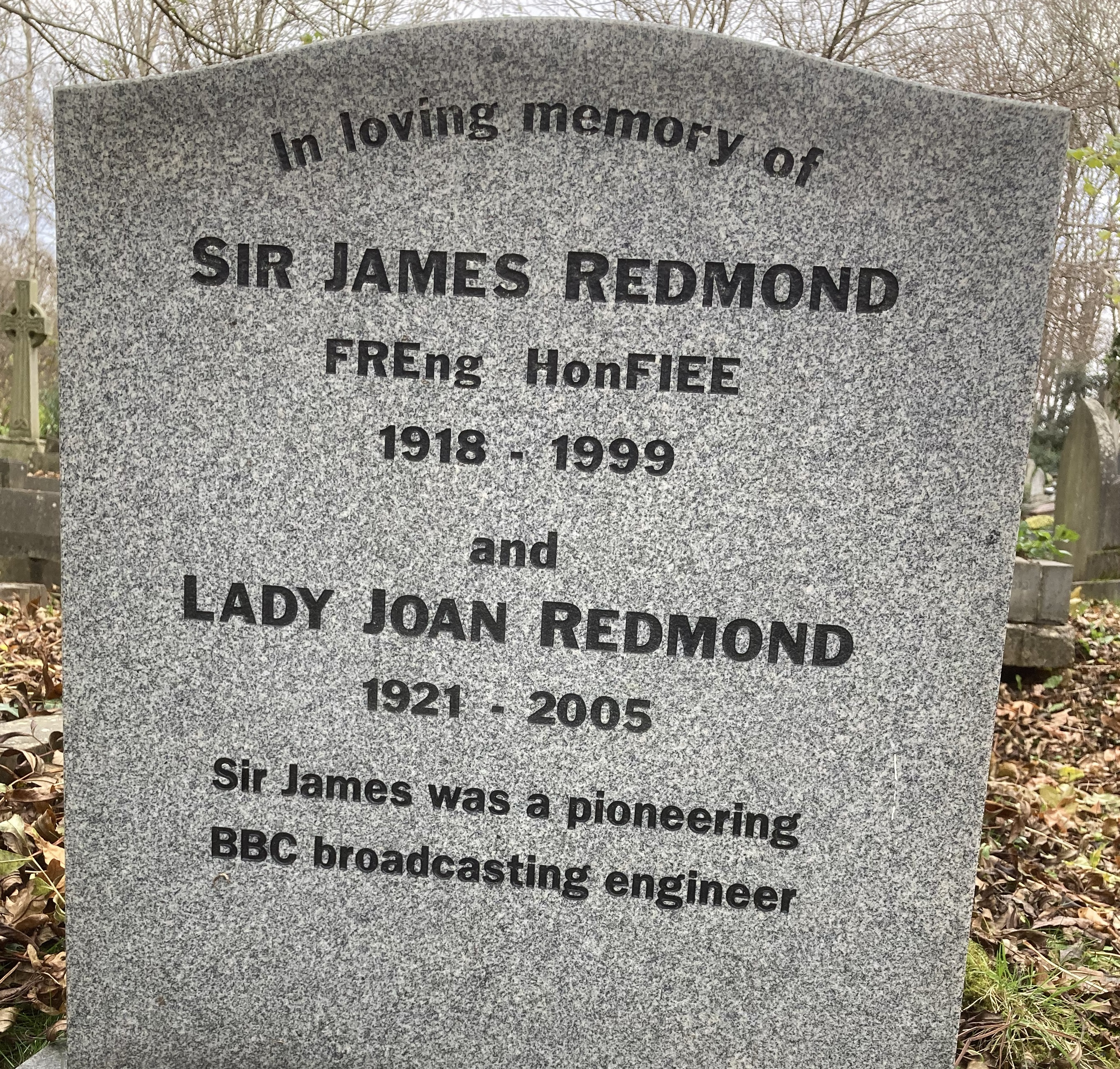
Grave of Sir James Redmond in Highgate Cemetery

During his time as Director of Engineering Redmond oversaw the introduction of colour broadcasting in 1970 and pushed for the BBC to adopt digital signalling and supported the introduction of Ceefax. He took overall responsibility for broadcasting the Eurovision Song Contest from London in 1968 although he privately detested the event. To his chagrin diplomatic reasons forced him to attend the actual concert and he was delighted when Cliff Richard's "Congratulations" was beaten into second place by the Spanish contestant Massiel as this meant he would not have to stage the contest again the following year.

Redmond was a natural supporter of the Open University as he had gained most of his engineering qualifications at night school and he put all the resources at his disposal into ensuring its success. He was a strong supporter of the BBC's engineering training centre at Wood Norton near Evesham and of the BBC Research Department. Not all the ideas he supported were successful. He was an enthusiast for quadrophonic sound and had a system set up in his home.

As well as working for the BBC Redmond was an extremely active member of the Institution of Electrical Engineers. He was appointed President of the IEE in 1978 and was appointed a Fellow of the Royal Academy of Engineering in the same year. In 1980 he presented the Bernard Price Memorial Lecture. He became an Honorary Fellow of the IEE in 1989.

He retired from the BBC in 1979 and was made a Knight Bachelor in that year's New Year Honours' List. Equally active in retirement as when he was in work, Redmond served on the Council of the Open University from 1981–1995 and on the Council of Brunel University from 1980–1988. Both universities awarded him honorary doctorates. He also acted as a consultant to various private companies.

He died on 17 October 1999 and his ashes were buried on the eastern side of Highgate Cemetery.

After his death, his family donated his large collection of technical papers to the Institution of Engineering and Technology archive. They include many BBC Research Department papers and a copy of the "Black Book" – a tutorial with circuit diagrams of the original Alexandra Palace installation written by Douglas Birkinshaw.

== Publications ==
Broadcasting the Developing Technology

Inaugural Address as IEE President (The Proceedings of the IEE Vol 126 No 1 1979)

== Sources ==
- Who's Who 1979
- The Independent 20.10.99 (obituary)
- The Scotsman 29.10.99 (obituary)
- The Times 30.11.99 (obituary)
- BBC Film History Archive 22.8.90 (filmed memoirs)
- 'A Retake Please!' Pat Jackson Liverpool University Press and Royal Naval Museum Publications 1999 ISBN 0-85323-953-3 on the making of 'Western Approaches'
- 'Western Approaches' DVD Imperial War Museum 2004. Region Code 2 only DD06067
