= Christopher Bathurst, 3rd Viscount Bledisloe =

British politician

The Right Honourable The Viscount Bledisloe QC
- Bledisloe in 2009

Member of the House of Lords
- Lord Temporal
- Hereditary peerage 12 November 1979 – 11 November 1999
- Preceded by: The 2nd Viscount Bledisloe
- Succeeded by: Seat abolished
- Elected Hereditary Peer; 11 November 1999 – 12 May 2009
- Election: 1999
- Preceded by: Seat established
- Succeeded by: The 5th Baron Aberdare

Personal details
- Born: Christopher Hiley Ludlow Bathurst; 24 June 1934
- Died: 12 May 2009 (aged 74)
- Party: Crossbench
- Spouse: Elizabeth Mary Thompson (m. 1962; div. 1986)
- Children: 3
- Parent: Benjamin Bathurst, 2nd Viscount Bledisloe (father)
- Education: Eton College; Trinity College, Oxford

Christopher Hiley Ludlow Bathurst, 3rd Viscount Bledisloe, QC (24 June 1934 – 12 May 2009), was a British barrister and politician.

Bledisloe was the son of Benjamin Bathurst, 2nd Viscount Bledisloe. He was educated at Eton – having won a scholarship from Ludgrove – and Trinity College, Oxford, but left the latter after a year. He served in the army as a Second Lieutenant of the 11th Hussars from 1954 to 1955 and was called to the Bar at Gray's Inn in 1959, after placing fourth out of 500 candidates in the Bar exams. In 1978 he became a Queen's Counsel (QC).

He was one of the ninety hereditary peers elected by the other hereditary peers to take a seat in the House of Lords, which most hereditary peers lost by the House of Lords Act 1999. The Bledisloe seat is Lydney Park, Gloucestershire, from which the territorial designation of the peerage was taken. He sat as a crossbencher.

Bledisloe married Elizabeth Mary Thompson in 1962. They had two sons and one daughter and divorced in 1986. His elder son and successor, Rupert Bathurst, 4th Viscount Bledisloe, is a noted portrait artist. Bledisloe died on 12 May 2009.

Bledisloe was the President of the St. Moritz Tobogganing Club (SMTC), also known as the Cresta.

Peerage of the United Kingdom
Preceded by Benjamin Bathurst	Viscount Bledisloe; 1979–2009; Member of the House of Lords (1979–1999)	Succeeded by Rupert Bathurst
Preceded by Benjamin Bathurst	Baron Bledisloe; 1979–2009	Succeeded by Rupert Bathurst
Parliament of the United Kingdom
New office created by the House of Lords Act 1999	Elected hereditary peer to the House of Lords under the House of Lords Act 1999; 1999–2009	Succeeded by The Lord Aberdare
