= Baron Shepherd =

Barony in the Peerage of the United Kingdom

Baron Shepherd, of Spalding in the County of Lincoln, is a title in the Peerage of the United Kingdom. It was created in 1946 for George Shepherd, who had previously served as National Agent of the Labour Party. His only son, Malcolm Newton Shepherd, 2nd Baron Shepherd the second Baron, was also a prominent Labour politician and notably served as Leader of the House of Lords. After the House of Lords Act 1999 removed the automatic right of hereditary peers to sit in the House of Lords he was given a life peerage as Baron Shepherd of Spalding, of Spalding in the County of Lincolnshire. This enabled him to remain an active member of the House of Lords On his death in 2001 the life barony became extinct, while he was succeeded in the hereditary barony by his eldest son, Graeme, the third and (As of 2020) present holder of the title.

== Barons Shepherd (1946) ==
- George Robert Shepherd, 1st Baron Shepherd (1881–1954)
- Malcolm Newton Shepherd, 2nd Baron Shepherd, Baron Shepherd of Spalding (1918–2001)
- Graeme George Shepherd, 3rd Baron Shepherd (b. 1949)

The heir apparent is the present holder's son Hon. Patrick Shepherd (b. 1980).
The heir apparent's heir apparent is his son George Timothy Shepherd (b. 2012)
