= James Hennessy, 2nd Baron Windlesham =

British peer and army officer (1903–1962)

James Bryan George Hennessy, 2nd Baron Windlesham (4 August 1903 – 16 November 1962) was a British peer and decorated British Army officer.

== Biography ==
James Bryan George Hennessy was the first son of George Hennessy, 1st Baron Windlesham. He was educated at Eton College and the Royal Military College, Sandhurst. He was commissioned into the British Army as a second lieutenant on 30 August 1923. He served in the Grenadier Guards during the Second World War, before retiring from the army in 1948 with the rank of brigadier.

He joined the House of Lords in 1953, having succeeded as Baron Windlesham on the death of his father. As for his politics, he was described as a "Liberal Peer of Conservative leanings". He was killed in a helicopter crash at sea off the coast of St David's Head, Wales on 16 November 1962: his body was not recovered. He was succeeded by his son (David Hennessy, 3rd Baron Windlesham).

In recognition of his service during the Second World War, he was awarded the Croix de Guerre (with palm) and made a Commander of the Order of Leopold II by Belgium, and made a Commander of the Order of George I by Greece.

== Personal life ==
Lord Windlesham was married twice. Firstly, he married Angela Duggan, daughter of Julian Duggan and Angela Casey, on 6 June 1929. The couple had four children, three daughters, and a son, David, later 3rd Baron Windlesham.

He married, secondly, Pamela Joan Kennedy, daughter of Francis Kennedy, on 25 March 1957.

== Arms ==
Coat of arms of James Hennessy, 2nd Baron Windlesham
Crest In front of a dexter arm embowed in armour the hand grasping a battle-axe a trefoil slipped and a red rose stalked and saltirewise all Proper. Escutcheon Gules a boar passant Proper on a chief Or a trefoil slipped Vert between two roses of the field barbed and seeded also Proper. Supporters On either side an officer of the Irish Brigade in the service of the King of France in the 18th century Proper the dexter supporting with the exterior hand a gold mounted and tasselled staff Proper. Motto Vi Vivo Et Armis

Peerage of the United Kingdom
Preceded by George Hennessy	Baron Windlesham; 1953–1962	Succeeded by David Hennessy
