= Viscount Bledisloe =

Viscountcy in the Peerage of the United Kingdom

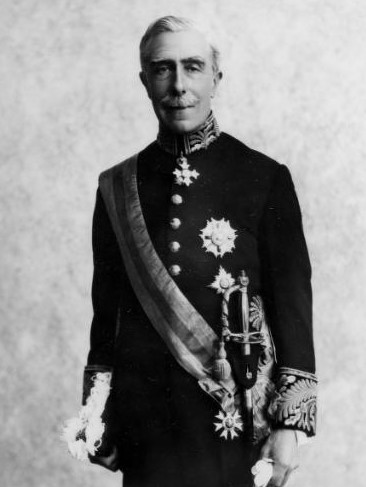
Charles Bathurst, 1st Viscount Bledisloe

Viscount Bledisloe, of Lydney in the County of Gloucestershire, is a title in the Peerage of the United Kingdom. It was created in 1935 for the Conservative politician Charles Bathurst, 1st Baron Bledisloe, upon his retirement as Governor-General of New Zealand. He had already been created Baron Bledisloe, of Lydney in the County of Gloucestershire, in 1918, also in the Peerage of the United Kingdom. Bathurst was the great-grandson and namesake of the early-19th-century politician Charles Bathurst. The latter was the son of Charles Bragge and Anne Bathurst, granddaughter of Sir Benjamin Bathurst, younger brother of Allen Bathurst, 1st Earl Bathurst. In 1804, Charles Bathurst assumed the surname of Bathurst in lieu of Bragge. The first Viscount's grandson, third Viscount, was one of the ninety elected hereditary peers that were allowed to remain in the House of Lords after the passing of the House of Lords Act 1999, and sat as a crossbencher until his death. He was also a member of the Lords Constitution Committee. As of 2017 the titles are held by his son, the fourth Viscount, who succeeded in 2009.

The family seat is Lydney Park, near Lydney, Gloucestershire.

== Baron Bledisloe (1918) ==
- Charles Bathurst, 1st Baron Bledisloe (1867–1958) (created Viscount Bledisloe in 1935)

=== Viscount Bledisloe (1935) ===
- Charles Bathurst, 1st Viscount Bledisloe (1867–1958)
- Benjamin Ludlow Bathurst, 2nd Viscount Bledisloe (1899–1979)
- Christopher Hiley Ludlow Bathurst, 3rd Viscount Bledisloe (1934–2009)
- Rupert Edward Ludlow Bathurst, 4th Viscount Bledisloe (born 1964)

The heir apparent is the present holder's son, the Hon. Benjamin Bathurst (born 2004).

== See also ==
- Earl Bathurst
