= Baron Aberdare =

Title in the Peerage of the United Kingdom

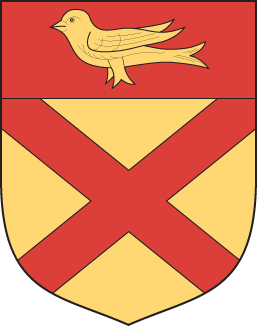
- Creation date: 23 August 1873
- Created by: Queen Victoria
- Peerage: United Kingdom
- First holder: Henry Bruce, 1st Baron Aberdare
- Present holder: Alastair Bruce, 5th Baron Aberdare
- Heir apparent: Hon. Hector Bruce
- Remainder to: the 1st Baron's heirs male of the body lawfully begotten.
- Former seat: Dyffryn Gardens

Baron Aberdare, of Duffryn in the County of Glamorgan, is a title in the Peerage of the United Kingdom. It was created on 23 August 1873 for the Liberal politician Henry Bruce. He served as Home Secretary from 1868 to 1873.

His grandson, the third Baron, was a soldier, cricketer and tennis player and a member of the International Olympic Committee. His son, the fourth Baron, held office in the Conservative administration of Edward Heath and was later a Deputy Speaker of the House of Lords. Lord Aberdare was one of the ninety-two elected hereditary peers that were allowed to remain in the House of Lords after the passing of the House of Lords Act 1999.

As of 2024, the title is held by his son, the fifth Baron, who succeeded in 2005 and was elected to the House of Lords in 2009.

== Lineage ==
Henry Bruce, 1st Baron Aberdare, was the son of John Bruce-Pryce (born John Bruce Knight in Barnstaple, Devon), the eldest son of John Knight (died 1799) and Margaret Bruce (died 1809), daughter and heir of William Bruce of Llanblethian, Glamorgan. He descends from the Welsh Bruces, a branch of Bruce of Kennet of Clackmannan that dates to the 14th century.

In 1805, Lord Aberdare's father changed his surname from Knight to Bruce when he reached the age of majority and inherited the Bruce estates in Llanblethian, as per his grandfather's will. His younger brothers were Rev. William Bruce Knight (1785–1845) and Sir James Knight-Bruce (1791–1866).

In 1837, he changed his name again to Bruce-Pryce when he inherited Duffryn and the Monknash estates from a distant cousin, Frances Anne Grey (née Pryce; the daughter and heiress of Thomas Pryce), who had married Hon. William Booth Grey (1773–1852; the second son of the 5th Earl of Stamford).

Lord Aberdare's great-grandmother, Jane Lewis, was the daughter of MP Gabriel Lewis, of Llanishen House. The Lewis family of Van Castle, Glamorgan, had been prominent in politics since the 16th century.

== Coat of arms ==
The heraldic blazon for the coat of arms of the family is: Or, a saltire gules, on a chief of the last a martlet of the field.

== Barons Aberdare (1873) ==
- Henry Austin Bruce, 1st Baron Aberdare (1815–1895)
- Henry Campbell Bruce, 2nd Baron Aberdare (1851–1929)
  - Hon. Henry Lyndhurst Bruce (1881–1914), killed in action at Ypres
- Clarence Napier Bruce, 3rd Baron Aberdare (1885–1957)
- Morys George Lyndhurst Bruce, 4th Baron Aberdare (1919–2005)
- Alastair John Lyndhurst Bruce, 5th Baron Aberdare (born 1947)

The heir apparent is the present holder's son, the Hon. Hector Morys Napier Bruce (born 1974).

=== Title succession chart ===
Title succession chart, Barons Aberdare.

Henry Bruce; 1st Baron Aberdare; 1815–1895
Henry Bruce; 2nd Baron Aberdare; 1851–1929
Hon. Henry Bruce; 1881–1914	Clarence Bruce; 3rd Baron Aberdare; 1885–1957
Morys Bruce; 4th Baron Aberdare; 1919–2005
Alastair Bruce; 5th Baron Aberdare born 1947
Hon. Hector Bruce born 1974

== Bibliography ==
- Cokayne, George E. (1910). Gibbs, Vicary (ed.). The complete peerage of England, Scotland, Ireland, Great Britain and the United Kingdom, extant, extinct, or dormant. Vol. I, Ab-Adam to Basing. London: St. Catherine Press. pp. 13–14.
- Cokayne, George E. (1998). Hammond, Peter W. (ed.). The complete peerage of England, Scotland, Ireland, Great Britain and the United Kingdom, extant, extinct, or dormant. Vol. XIV, Addenda and Corrigenda. London: Sutton Publishing. pp. 3–4.
- Montague-Smith, Patrick W., ed. (2008). "ABERDARE, BARON (Bruce) (BARON UK 1873).". Debrett's Peerage and Baronetage 2008. London: Debrett's Peerage Limited.
- Kidd, Charles (1903). Debrett's peerage, baronetage, knightage, and companionage. London: Dean & Son. p. 62.
- Hesilrige, Arthur G. M. (1921). Debrett's Peerage and Titles of courtesy. London: Dean & Son. p. 18.
