= Alastair Bruce, 5th Baron Aberdare =

British politician

The Right Honourable The Lord Aberdare KStJ DL
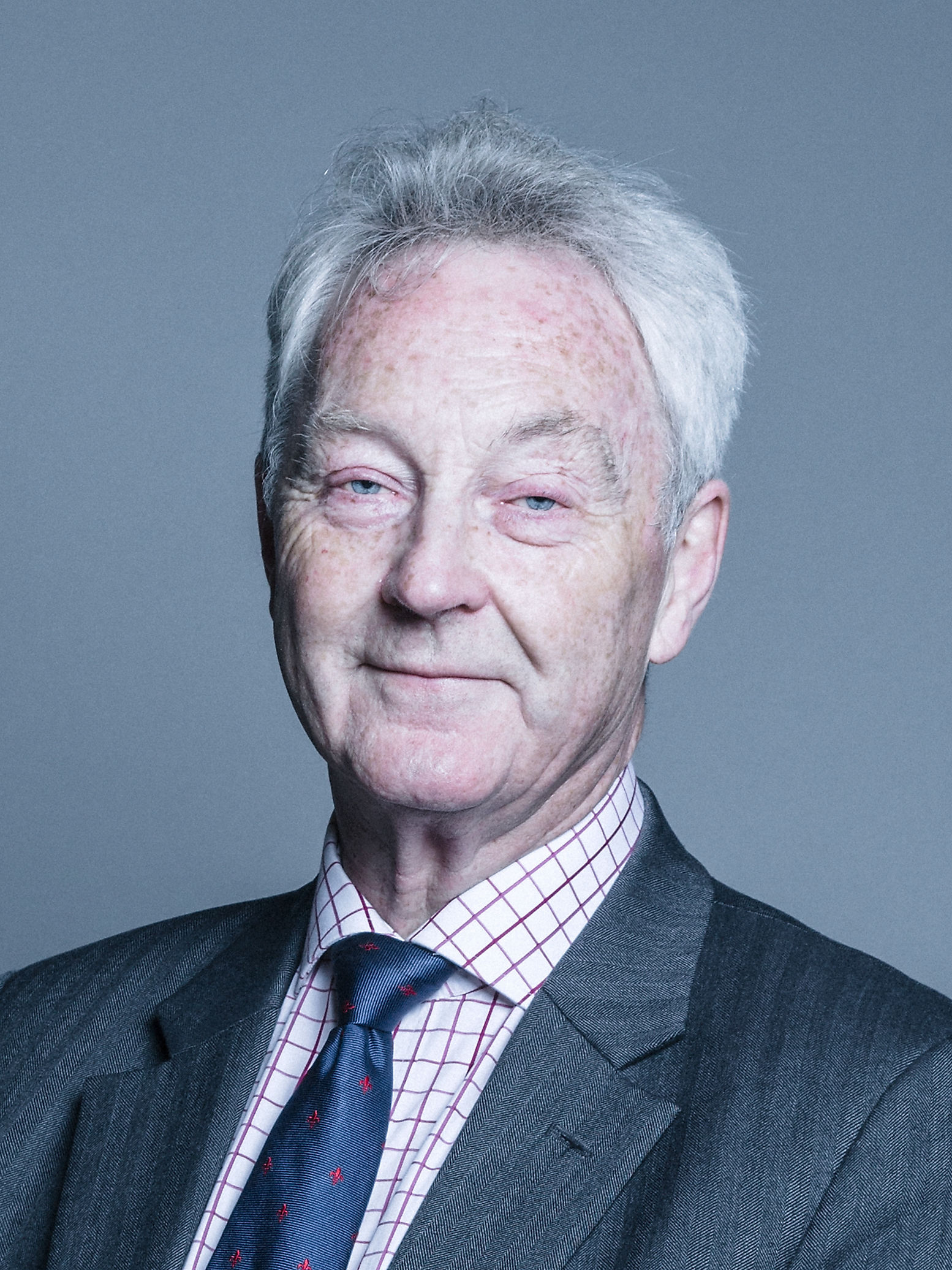
- Official parliamentary portrait

Member of the House of Lords
- Lord Temporal
- Elected Hereditary Peer; 20 July 2009 – 31 August 2025
- By-election: 2009
- Preceded by: The 3rd Viscount Bledisloe
- Succeeded by: Seat abolished

Personal details
- Born: Alastair John Lyndhurst Bruce; 2 May 1947 (age 79) London, England
- Party: Crossbench
- Spouse: Elizabeth Mary Cuthbert Foulkes (m. 1971)
- Parent(s): Morys Bruce, 4th Baron Aberdare; Maud Helen Sarah Dashwood

Alastair John Lyndhurst Bruce, 5th Baron Aberdare (born 2 May 1947), is a British hereditary peer and former crossbench member of the House of Lords.

== Early life and education ==
Lord Aberdare was born at 12 Avenue Road in St John's Wood, London, the son of Morys Bruce, 4th Baron Aberdare, and Maud Helen Sarah Dashwood, only daughter of Sir John Dashwood, 10th Baronet. His godparents included Lord Terrington and Diana Bowes-Lyon. Aberdare was educated at Eton and Christ Church, Oxford. He succeeded his father upon the latter's death in 2005.

== Career ==
- IBM, 1969–1991
- Partner, Bruce Naughton Wade, 1991–1999
- Director, ProbusBNW, 1999–?
- Trustee, National Botanic Garden of Wales, 1994–2006
- Fellow, Royal Society for the encouragement of Arts, Manufactures & Commerce
- Honorary Fellow of Cardiff University since July 2008
- Sub Prior of the Venerable Order of St John of Jerusalem, Priory of Wales.

== Offices ==
Lord Aberdare is president of the Cynon Valley History Society.

== House of Lords ==
Coats of arms of Alastair Bruce

In July 2009, Lord Aberdare was elected to sit in the House of Lords, following the death of Lord Bledisloe in May 2009. A by-election took place under the terms of the House of Lords Act 1999, which provided for 92 hereditary peers to keep their seats in the reformed House, with vacancies in their number filled from amongst all non-sitting hereditary peers. The result was announced in the Chamber of the Lords on 15 July 2009, following the voting by 27 of the 29 Crossbench peers eligible to take part. His maiden speech, made on 26 November 2009 during the debate on the Queen's Speech, focused on the transition from education to employment. He retired from the Lords on 31 August 2025.

== Family ==
He married Elizabeth Mary Culbert Foulkes in 1971; they have two children:

- Hon. Hector Morys Napier Bruce (born 1974)
- Hon. Sarah Katherine Mary Bruce (born 1976)

Peerage of the United Kingdom
Preceded by Morys Bruce	Baron Aberdare; 2005–present	Incumbent; Heir apparent: Hon. Hector Bruce
Parliament of the United Kingdom
Preceded by The Viscount Bledisloe	Elected hereditary peer to the House of Lords under the House of Lords Act 1999; 2009–2025	Vacant
