= Morys Bruce, 4th Baron Aberdare =

British politician (1919–2005)

The Right Honourable The Lord Aberdare KBE GCStJ PC DL
- Lord Aberdare in 1967

Minister without portfolio
- In office 8 January 1974 – 4 March 1974
- Prime Minister: Edward Heath
- Preceded by: The Lord Drumalbyn
- Succeeded by: The Lord Young of Graffham

Minister of State for Health and Social Security
- In office 23 June 1970 – 8 January 1974
- Prime Minister: Edward Heath
- Preceded by: The Baroness Serota
- Succeeded by: Brian O'Malley

Member of the House of Lords
- Lord Temporal
- Hereditary peerage 4 October 1957 – 11 November 1999
- Preceded by: The 3rd Baron Aberdare
- Succeeded by: Seat abolished
- Elected Hereditary Peer; 11 November 1999 – 23 January 2005
- Election: 1999
- Preceded by: Seat established
- Succeeded by: The 2nd Viscount Eccles

Personal details
- Born: Morys George Lyndhurst Bruce; 16 June 1919
- Died: 23 January 2005 (aged 85)
- Party: Conservative
- Spouse: Maud Helen Sarah Dashwood (m. 1946)
- Parent: Clarence Bruce, 3rd Baron Aberdare (father)
- Education: Sandroyd School; Winchester College
- Alma mater: New College, Oxford

Morys George Lyndhurst Bruce, 4th Baron Aberdare (16 June 1919 – 23 January 2005), was a Conservative politician, and from 1999 until his death, one of ninety-two elected hereditary peers in the British House of Lords. He was the eldest son of Clarence Bruce, 3rd Baron Aberdare, and Margaret Bethune Black, and succeeded to his father's title on the latter's death in 1957.

== Education ==
Bruce was educated at Sandroyd School before heading to Winchester College and New College, Oxford, where he read Politics, Philosophy and Economics.

== Career ==
Coats of Arms of Morys Bruce

In 1939 he joined the British Army, commissioned with the rank of lieutenant in the Welsh Guards; he would eventually reach the rank of captain, after having served in various staff positions with XII Corps, the 21st Army Group, and XXX Corps during and after World War II.

He joined The Rank Organisation in 1947, working there for two years before moving to the British Broadcasting Corporation, where he worked between 1949 and 1956. In 1970, he became Minister of State for the Department of Health and Social Security; in 1974, he was appointed to the Privy Council and became a Minister without Portfolio. Between 1976 and 1992, he served as Chairman of Committees of the House of Lords, (Deputy Speaker of the House of Lords). In 1984, he was created a Knight Commander of the Order of the British Empire, and he would serve various positions within the Order of St John of Jerusalem. After the House of Lords Act 1999 prevented hereditary peers from sitting in the Lords solely by virtue of their peerages, Lord Aberdare became one of the ninety-two hereditary peers elected to stay in the House of Lords.

On 24 August 1992, he officially opened Chester City's new football stadium, the Deva Stadium.

Lord Aberdare was a lifelong devotee of real tennis, winning the British amateur singles championship four times between 1953 and 1957, and the amateur doubles championship four times between 1954 and 1961. He served as president of the Tennis and Rackets Association from 1972 until 2004. During his tenure there was a significant expansion in both real tennis and rackets, and a number of new courts were built while several others were re-opened. His book, The JT Faber Book of Tennis and Rackets (London: Quiller Press, 2001. ISBN 1-899163-62-X), is the most comprehensive modern reference for these sports.

Lord Aberdare was President of the London Welsh Trust, which runs the London Welsh Centre, from 1959 until 1962, and from 1969 to 1970.

== Family ==
In 1946 he married Maud Helen Sarah Dashwood, daughter of Sir John Dashwood, 10th Baronet, and Helen Moira Eaton. They had four children:

- Hon. Alastair John Lyndhurst Bruce (later 5th Baron; b. 2 May 1947)
- Hon. James Henry Morys Bruce (b. 28 December 1948), married and has issue
- Hon. Henry Adam Francis Bruce (b. 5 February 1962), married and has issue
- Hon. Charles Benjamin Bruce (b. 29 May 1965)

Political offices
Preceded by The Lord Shepherd	Deputy Leader of the House of Lords; 1970–1974	Succeeded by The Lord Beswick
Preceded by The Lord Drumalbyn	Minister without portfolio 1974	Succeeded by The Lord Young of Graffham
Preceded by The Earl of Listowel	Chairman of Committees of the House of Lords; 1977–1992	Succeeded by The Lord Ampthill
New office created by the House of Lords Act 1999	Elected hereditary peer to the House of Lords under the House of Lords Act 1999; 1999–2005	Succeeded by The Viscount Eccles
Peerage of the United Kingdom
Preceded by Clarence Bruce	Baron Aberdare; 1957–2005; Member of the House of Lords (1957–1999)	Succeeded by Alastair Bruce
