= David Young, Baron Young of Graffham =

British politician (1932–2022)

The Right Honourable The Lord Young of Graffham CH PC DL
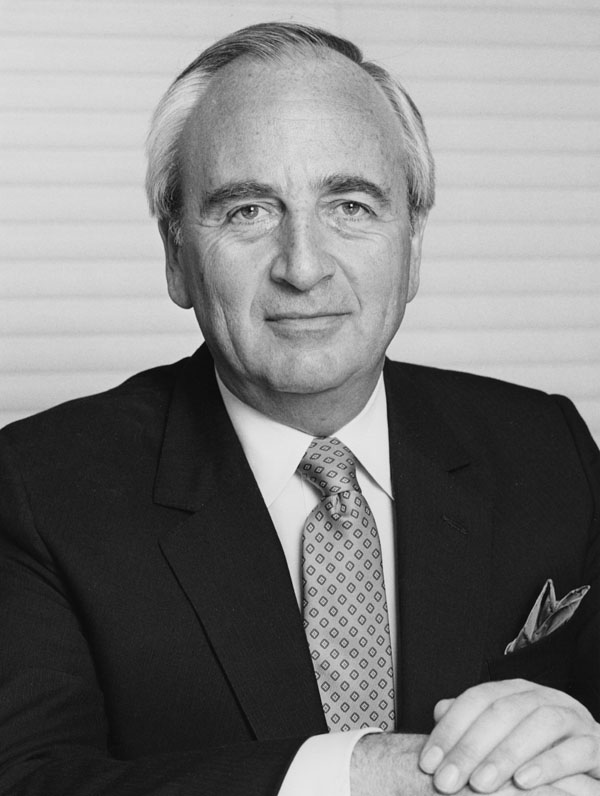
- Young c. 2000

Secretary of State for Trade and Industry; President of the Board of Trade
- In office 13 June 1987 – 24 July 1989
- Prime Minister: Margaret Thatcher
- Preceded by: Paul Channon
- Succeeded by: Nicholas Ridley

Secretary of State for Employment
- In office 2 September 1985 – 13 June 1987
- Prime Minister: Margaret Thatcher
- Preceded by: Tom King
- Succeeded by: Norman Fowler

Minister without Portfolio
- In office 11 September 1984 – 2 September 1985
- Prime Minister: Margaret Thatcher
- Preceded by: The Lord Aberdare
- Succeeded by: Jeremy Hanley

Member of the House of Lords
- Lord Temporal
- Life peerage 10 October 1984 – 27 April 2022

Personal details
- Born: 27 February 1932 Upper Clapton, London, England
- Died: 9 December 2022 (aged 90) Regent's Park, London, England
- Party: Conservative
- Education: University College London

David Ivor Young, Baron Young of Graffham, CH, PC, DL (27 February 1932 – 9 December 2022) was a British Conservative politician, businessman, and life peer. He served in the Cabinet as Secretary of State for Employment and Secretary of State for Trade and Industry under Margaret Thatcher, and later reported to government on health and safety, small business and government procurement.

== Early life ==
David Ivor Young was born in Upper Clapton, London on 27 February 1932, into an orthodox Jewish family. His father was born in Yurevich, near Minsk, a village that is now in Belarus but was then largely populated by Lithuanian Jews, including Young's own family. He claimed that the family fled an antisemitic pogrom to England when David's father was 5.

In England, Young's father imported flour and later set up as a manufacturer of coats for children. Young went to Christ's College in Finchley and then University College London, to take a law degree as an evening student during his time as an articled clerk to become a solicitor, being admitted to the roll of solicitors in 1955.

== Business career ==
Having qualified as a solicitor, Young practised for only a year, after which he joined Great Universal Stores (GUS) as an executive, working for part of that time as an assistant to the chairman, Isaac Wolfson.

In 1961 he left GUS and set up his first business, Eldonwall, with funding from the Gestetner Family Settlements. During the 1960s he built up a group of companies in industrial property, construction and plant hire, selling out in June 1970 to Town & City Properties (T&CP), where he joined the board.

After the property crash of 1973–1974, Young assisted Jeffrey Sterling to reverse his company into T&CP to form a group that later became part of P&O.

In 1975, Young left the board and entered into a joint venture with Manufacturers Hanover, and became chairman of Manufacturers Hanover Property Services, lending on real estate in the United Kingdom and overseas. He also had a number of other commercial interests. He sold out all his commercial interests in 1980 upon entering the Department of Industry. His younger brother, Stuart, served as chairman of the BBC.

== Margaret Thatcher ==
Young became involved in voluntary organisations as chairman of the vocational training charity British ORT; he was made a director of the CPS in 1979 shortly after the general election that brought Margaret Thatcher to power. On the first day of the new government, Keith Joseph, the Secretary of State for Industry, appointed him his advisor responsible for what later became known as privatisation.

Because of his involvement with vocational training through ORT, he was picked by Norman Tebbit when he was Secretary of State for Employment to be the chairman of the Manpower Services Commission in 1981, the Government Agency dealing with unemployment and training matters. As such he became involved in government decisions and the Cabinet ministers who dealt with him regarded him very positively; he made his position as a 'dry' on economic policy.

He was created a life peer taking the title Baron Young of Graffham, of Graffham in the County of West Sussex on 10 October 1984. One month later, on 11 September it was announced that Young was to enter the cabinet as Minister without Portfolio (the first person to hold the role since Lord Aberdare in 1974) to advise the government on unemployment issues. As Minister without Portfolio he was appointed to the Privy Council. On 2 September 1985 he became Secretary of State for Employment.

=== 1987 election ===
Thatcher regarded Young as personally loyal to her and decided in March 1987 to put him into a central role in planning the 1987 election campaign, in effect to keep an eye on Norman Tebbit whom she suspected to be more interested in advancing his claims on the leadership. Young was in charge of organising Thatcher's tours and appearances on television. One week before polling day on 4 June 1987, Young and Tebbit had a major disagreement about the campaign strategy, a day nicknamed 'Wobbly Thursday'. According to The Independent, Young grabbed Tebbit by the lapels and said "Norman, listen to me, we are about to lose this fucking election".

=== Trade and Industry ===
Following the election Tebbit announced his retirement from the government, and Young was promoted to Secretary of State for Trade and Industry. He served two years in the role and privatised the last of the state industries in the department. In May 1989 he told the prime minister he would like to return to private life. He resigned from the Cabinet in 1989 but received an appointment as deputy chairman of the Conservative Party to help Kenneth Baker reorganise Central Office.

Young stood down from his ministerial post on the resignation of Thatcher.

== Later business career ==
Young then went back to business as a director of Salomon Inc. and executive chairman of Cable & Wireless. From 1993 he was president of the Institute of Directors, and from 1995 was chairman of Council of University College, London. He was the first president of Jewish Care (1990–1997).

Young retired from Cable & Wireless in 1995 and in 1996 set up his own company, Young Associates Ltd, with partners Simon Alberga and Yoav Kurtzbard, which actively invests in technology companies. Outside Young Associates he had a number of business interests. He was chairman and controlling shareholder of the Camcon Federation of companies, a Cambridge-based federation of companies with innovative technology in the oil and gas, auto and medical fields. He was controlling shareholder and on the board of TSSI Systems Ltd, a long-established company in security technology, and in both these companies he worked with Danny Chapchal. He was a substantial shareholder and chairman of Deep Tek Ltd, a company with developed technology to enable operations in deep and ultra-deep waters in the oil and gas sectors and in scientific exploration. He was a substantial shareholder and chairman of KashFlow Software Ltd, a leading provider of online accounting for SMEs.

In 1996, Young was involved in the privatisation of the Rostock Port, in Germany. Following several years of decline in port traffic, the Rostock city council agreed to sell the port to Kent Investments Ltd., a company controlled by Young, in partnership with two Israeli businessmen, Menachem Atzmon and Ezra Harel. It was later discovered that Young was only a frontman for the Israeli investors. The two were later under investigation by Israel Securities Authority, suspected of fraud and breach of trust. They acquired the port by obtaining a loan from Rogosin Industries, a public company they controlled, which raised the money by issuing bonds. Rogosin Industries then received an option to buy 25 percent of the port in exchange for forgiving the loan. Rogosin Industries eventually exercised this option, which left Harel and Atzmon owning 75 percent of Rostock Port using Rogosin's funds. The case was investigated after Rogosin Industries defaulted on its bonds, as it run out of cash to pay its bondholders. The company later went into liquidation.

== 2010 Cameron–Clegg government ==
In June 2010, Young was chosen by PM David Cameron to advise on health and safety laws:

To investigate and report back to the Prime Minister on the rise of the compensation culture over the last decade coupled with the current low standing that health and safety legislation now enjoys and to suggest solutions. Following the agreement of the report, to work with appropriate departments across government to bring the proposals into effect. (See report 'Common Sense Common Safety' below.)

In July, he moved from the Cabinet Office to Number 10. In November 2010, Young was obliged to apologise for having told The Daily Telegraph that, "For the vast majority of people in the country today, they have never had it so good ever since this recession – this so-called recession – started ..." He resigned, but was subsequently reappointed.

In October 2010, he released a review of workplace health and safety in the UK entitled 'Common Sense Common Safety', which faced many of the issues and saying that businesses now operate their health and safety policies in a climate of fear because sensible health and safety rules that apply to hazardous occupations have been applied across all occupations, and the excessive "enthusiasm with which often unqualified health and safety consultants have tried to eliminate all risk rather than apply the test in the Act of a 'reasonably practicable' approach". Young said that part of the responsibility lay with the EU's 1989 Framework Directive, which made risk assessments compulsory across all occupations, whether hazardous or not. Within days of the release of the review, the flood of health and safety stories in the press abated.

=== Enterprise Advisor ===
In October 2010, he was appointed enterprise adviser to Cameron, and was asked to conduct a "brutal" review of the relationship of government to small firms. This resulted in a three-part review to the prime minister on enterprise and small business.

- In May 2012, Young delivered the first part of this review. Entitled "Make Business Your Business", it was the first of its kind since the Bolton Report of 1971. (Note: Young noted that the Bolton Report was pessimistic about small businesses: "Bolton’s conclusion seems scarcely credible today: that the small firms sector was in a state of terminal decline in both number and in contribution to output and employment and in a few years would cease to exist. Economies of scale would make the remaining 800,000 small firms uncompetitive and doomed to extinction".) His report highlighted the number of start-up businesses to indicate a growing culture of enterprise and entrepreneurship in the UK. The report introduced a new Government programme, Start Up Loans, providing loans and mentoring to get a business venture started. Start Up Loans had as of June 2016 provided over £129 million of loans to 25,000 people.
- In June 2013, Young delivered a report entitled "Growing Your Business", which looked at how new and developing small firms could grow and expand into new markets. Following this, the government introduced reforms within public procurement with the aim of making it easier for small suppliers to win public sector contracts; a new "Small Business Charter", which aimed to extend the reach of university business schools into their local small business communities, and which he remained Patron of; and a "Growth Voucher programme" to assist companies "find and pay for professional strategic advice".
- Young's 2015 Report on Small Firms spoke of a "Golden Age for Small Firms", measured through a record number of small businesses being in existence and the sector's contribution to overall business employment in the UK.

In June 2014, Young reviewed the relevance of enterprise in education in his report "Enterprise for All". In December 2014 the Government accepted Young's recommendations in this report. These included the introduction of Enterprise Advisers, intended as a dedicated resource available to Head Teachers to support them in developing an appropriate careers and enterprise offer for their students, and an 'Enterprise Passport' through which young people would record their enterprise and extracurricular activities alongside their academic qualifications to future employers.

Young was appointed Member of the Order of the Companions of Honour (CH) in the 2015 New Year Honours.

== Charity interests ==
Young had a number of pro bono or charitable interests including the presidency of Chai Cancer Care and the Coram Trust, chairman of the Chichester Festival Theatre and of the Jewish Museum London, and trustee of the Co-Existence Trust and the MBI Al Jaber Foundation.

In December 2010, he became a patron of Lifelites, a charity providing technology for children in hospices.

== Publications ==
Young's political autobiography, The Enterprise Years, was published in 1990.

He wrote occasional opinion pieces. In one, he likened Boris Johnson to Harold Macmillan, while touting Enterprise Zones and suggesting the reintroduction of Thatcher's "more successful programmes like the Enterprise Allowance Scheme of old that created so many new businesses at the time."

== Personal life and death ==
Young was married to Lita (née Shaw), and they had two daughters, Karen and Judith. He died from pneumonia at his home in Regent's Park, London, on 9 December 2022, aged 90.

=== Coat of arms ===
Coat of arms of David Young, Baron Young of Graffham
Crest Within a circlet of roses Argent barbed and seeded Proper placed alternatively with bluebell flowers also Proper a lion's head Azure amid a show of three oak trees Proper fruited Gold Escutcheon Argent eight barrulets Azure overall a sword in bend proper hilt pommel and quillions Or between two roundels gyronny enarched also Gold and Azure each within an annulet Gold Supporters On either side in front of the exterior rear claws of a lion rampant reguardant Or a long-haired dachshund each respectant Proper Motto Soluvere Est Servire

== Notes ==
Political offices
Preceded by The Lord Aberdare	Minister without Portfolio; 1984–1985	Succeeded by Jeremy Hanley
Preceded by Tom King	Secretary of State for Employment; 1985–1987	Succeeded by Norman Fowler
Preceded by Paul Channon	Secretary of State for Trade and Industry; 1987–1989	Succeeded by Nicholas Ridley
