= David Hennessy, 3rd Baron Windlesham =

British peer, politician and academic (1932–2010)

The Right Honourable The Lord Windlesham CVO PC FBA
- Hennessy in 1995

Leader of the House of Lords Lord Keeper of the Privy Seal
- In office 23 May 1973 – 4 March 1974
- Monarch: Elizabeth II
- Prime Minister: Edward Heath
- Preceded by: The Earl Jellicoe
- Succeeded by: The Lord Shepherd

Minister of State for Northern Ireland
- In office 26 March 1972 – 5 June 1973
- Monarch: Elizabeth II
- Prime Minister: Edward Heath
- Preceded by: Office established
- Succeeded by: The Lord Belstead (as Parliamentary Under-Secretary of State)

Minister of State for Home Affairs
- In office 23 June 1970 – 26 March 1972
- Monarch: Elizabeth II
- Prime Minister: Edward Heath
- Preceded by: Shirley Williams
- Succeeded by: The Viscount Colville of Culross

Member of the House of Lords
- Lord Temporal
- Hereditary peerage 20 February 1963 – 11 November 1999
- Preceded by: The 2nd Baron Windlesham
- Succeeded by: Seat abolished
- Life peerage 16 November 1999 – 21 December 2010

Personal details
- Born: 28 January 1932
- Died: 21 December 2010 (aged 78)
- Party: Conservative
- Education: Trinity College, Oxford

David James George Hennessy, 3rd Baron Windlesham, Baron Hennessy, CVO, PC, FBA (28 January 1932 – 21 December 2010) was a Conservative Party politician in the United Kingdom who held visiting professorships at various universities.

== Early life ==
Hennessy, an Anglo-Irish peer, was educated at Ampleforth College and Trinity College, Oxford, earning a Master of Arts in Jurisprudence in 1957. He did his National Service with the Grenadier Guards in Tripoli. His father, James Hennessy, 2nd Baron Windlesham, was a Lieutenant General in the Grenadier Guards. They are closely related to the Franco-Irish Cognac Hennessy family.

== Political career ==
Hennessy was elected to Westminster Borough Council in 1958 to 1962, unsuccessfully contested Tottenham in 1959, and entered the House of Lords as the 3rd Baron Windlesham upon his father's death in 1962, who died in a helicopter accident at sea, having been a brigadier in the Grenadier Guards. He joined the Government as Minister of State in the Home Office in 1970 to 1972; and from 1972 to 1973, in the Northern Ireland Office, after which he became Lord Keeper of the Privy Seal and Leader of the House of Lords in June 1973 until October 1974. He was appointed a Commander of the Royal Victorian Order (CVO) in the 1981 New Year's Honours. On 16 November 1999, he was created Baron Hennessy, of Windlesham in the County of Surrey after the House of Lords Act 1999, so that he could continue sitting in the Lords.

== Media ==
He worked for Associated-Rediffusion and was involved in This Week. He later joined the board of Rediffusion as Chief Programme Executive. His TV career continued as managing director of Grampian (1967–1970) and managing director of the ATV network (1974–1981). He was a director of The Observer from 1981 to 1989.

== Academic ==
Hennessy returned to Oxford, where he earned a DLitt, and was principal of Brasenose College from 1989 to 2002. He had also been a visiting professor at Princeton University in 1997 and 2002 to 2003.

== Family ==
Baron Windlesham married the fashion journalist and author Prudence Glynn in 1965. She died in 1986; he is survived by a son, James, and a daughter, Victoria.

== Arms ==
Coat of arms of David Hennessy, 3rd Baron Windlesham
Crest In front of a dexter arm embowed in armour the hand grasping a battle-axe a trefoil slipped and a red rose stalked and saltirewise all Proper. Escutcheon Gules a boar passant Proper on a chief Or a trefoil slipped Vert between two roses of the field barbed and seeded also Proper. Supporters On either side an officer of the Irish Brigade in the service of the King of France in the 18th century Proper the dexter supporting with the exterior hand a gold mounted and tasselled staff Proper. Motto Vi Vivo Et Armis

Peerage of the United Kingdom
Preceded by James Hennessy	Baron Windlesham; 1962–2010	Succeeded by James Hennessy
Political offices
Preceded by The Earl Jellicoe	Lord Privy Seal; 1973–1974	Succeeded by The Lord Shepherd
Preceded by The Earl Jellicoe	Leader of the House of Lords; 1973–1974	Succeeded by The Lord Shepherd
Party political offices
Preceded by The Earl Jellicoe	Leader of the Conservative Party in the House of Lords; 1973–1974	Succeeded by The Lord Carrington
Academic offices
Preceded by Barry Nicholas	Principal of Brasenose College, Oxford; 1989–2002	Succeeded by Roger Cashmore
