= Clarence Bruce, 3rd Baron Aberdare =

British military officer and sportsman (1885–1957)

The Right Honourable The Lord Aberdare GBE KStJ
- Aberdare in 1930

Member of the House of Lords
- Lord Temporal
- In office 20 February 1929 – 4 October 1957
- Preceded by: The 2nd Baron Aberdare
- Succeeded by: The 4th Baron Aberdare

Personal details
- Born: 2 August 1885 Westminster, England
- Died: 4 October 1957 (aged 72) Risan, Yugoslavia
- Spouse(s): Margaret Bethune Black (m. 1912–1950) Griselda Hervey (m. 1957)
- Children: Morys George Lyndhurst Bruce; Nigel Henry Clarence Bruce; Rosalind Louise Balfour Bruce; Gwyneth Margaret Bruce
- Parent(s): Henry Bruce, 2nd Baron Aberdare; Constance Mary Beckett

Clarence Napier Bruce, 3rd Baron Aberdare (2 August 1885 – 4 October 1957), styled The Honourable Clarence Bruce from 1895 to 1929, was a British military officer, cricketer, tennis player, and golfer who worked as a sports administrator. He was killed in an automobile accident in 1957 after attending an International Olympic Committee meeting in the Balkans.

== Early life and education ==
Bruce was born at 29 Eaton Place, Westminster, the second son of Henry Bruce, 2nd Baron Aberdare and Constance Mary Beckett.

Bruce received his education at Twyford School, Winchester College and at New College, Oxford, and was admitted as a barrister of the Inner Temple; however, when World War I broke out, he decided to enter the British Army. His elder brother was killed in action in 1914, making him heir apparent to his father's barony.

== Career ==
Lord Aberdare, who would rise to the substantive rank of captain (and would become an honorary colonel) in World War I, served variously in the Glamorgan Yeomanry, the 2nd Life Guards, the headquarters of the 61st (2nd South Midland) Division and in the Guards Machine Gun Regiment; in 1919, immediately after the armistice, he was promoted to captain. He inherited the barony in 1929. He served as the honorary colonel of the 77 (later 282) (Welsh) Heavy AA Brigade, Royal Artillery, from 1930 to 1952; during this period, he additionally served as major of the 11th Battalion, Surrey Home Guards, during World War II.

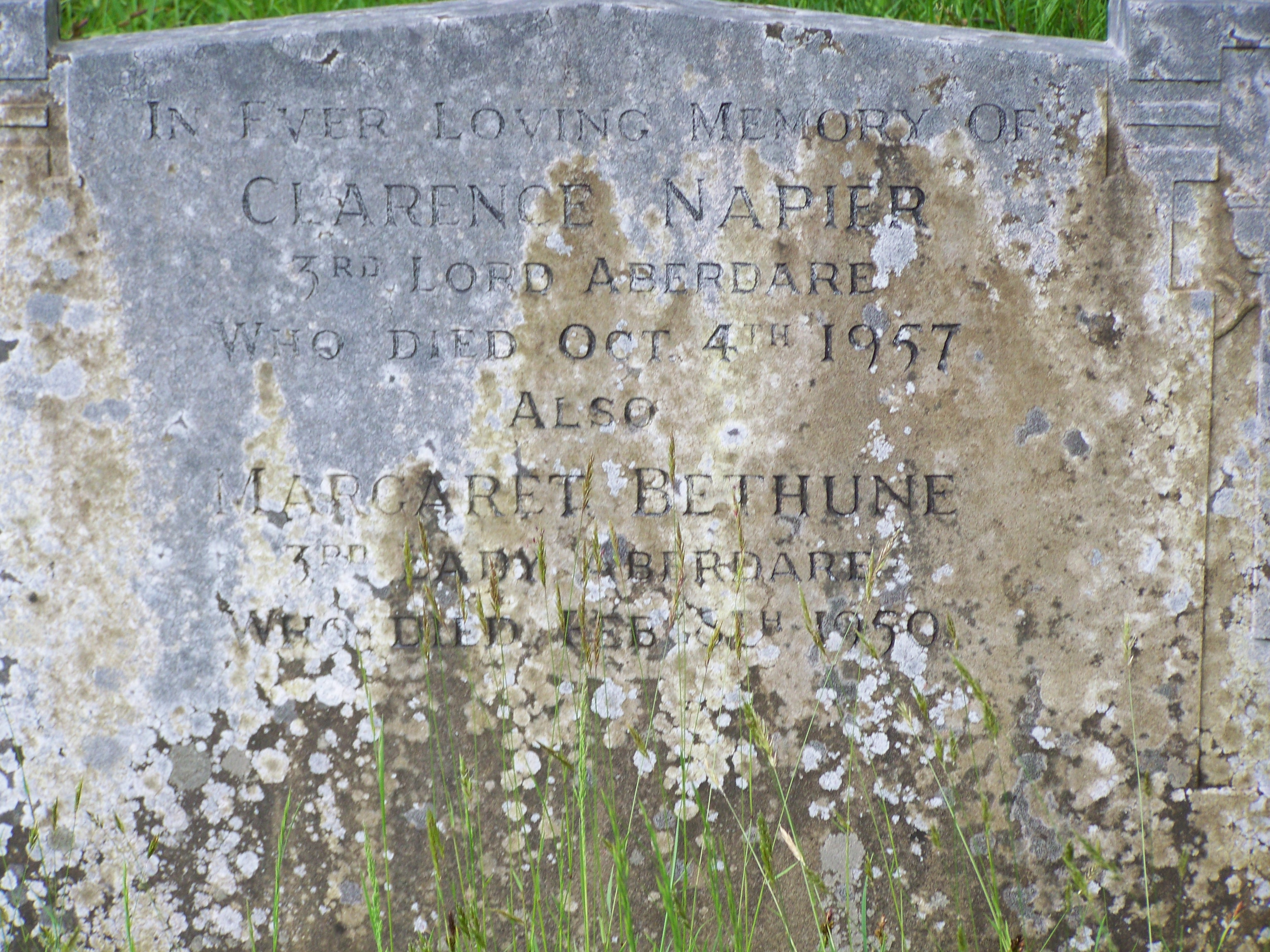
Lord Aberdare's memorial at Aberffrwd cemetery in Mountain Ash, Wales.

Between the two world wars, he was an active real tennis player. Bruce was U.S.A. Amateur Champion in 1930 and of the British Isles in 1932 and 1938. He played eighteen times for Great Britain in the Bathurst Cup and six times won the Coupe de Paris. He carried off the M.C.C. Gold Prize on five occasions and nine times won the Silver Prize. He was also a keen cricketer, playing 96 first-class matches for Oxford University Cricket Club, Middlesex County Cricket Club, the Gentlemen of England, the Gentlemen cricket team, Harlequins Cricket Club, and the Wales national team.

Coats of arms of Clarence Bruce

In 1937, Aberdare was appointed chairman of the National Fitness Council, the first attempt at a Sports Council in England. It quickly established 22 area committees to help with its aim of promoting a fit population. It was funded by the Department of Education and provided capital grants for new facilities and other grants to help with the appointment of trainers and leaders. It had a difficult two years before being dissolved in October 1939. These included liaison with existing statutory and voluntary organisations. In absorbing the Juvenile Organisations Committee and its local committees it alienated many who had worked towards bridging the gap between recreation provided at school and to the wider community (14–20 age group). In addition there was much support for compulsory physical training as opposed to the council's approach of a voluntary ethos.

Simultaneously, Aberdare played an active role in the organisation of the Olympics; he served on the International Olympic Committee, and on the organising committee of the 1948 Summer Olympics in London. He was a key player in the decision to send British athletes to Hitler's 1936 Summer Olympics in Berlin, asserting that "neither nor his colleagues 'had yet heard of a genuine case of an Olympic athlete being boycotted or impeded because of his non-Aryan origin'", this despite Nazi Germany's overtly stated anti-semitism. He served in many physical education and sportsmen's clubs, and was also a member of the New College Society.

In 1948, he was created a Knight of the Order of St John of Jerusalem, and a Commander of the Order of the British Empire a year later. In 1954, he was additionally created a Knight Grand Cross of the Order of the British Empire.

== Marriage and issue ==
In 1912, he married Margaret Bethune Black, with whom he had two sons and two daughters:

- Hon. Morys Bruce (1919–2005), married in 1946 Maud Helen Sarah Dashwood, daughter of Sir John Dashwood, 10th Baronet; succeeded his father as 4th Baron Aberdare
- Hon. Nigel Henry Clarence Bruce (born 17 June 1921), married Catherine Marion Wolfe, daughter of Thomas Wolfe
- Hon. Rosalind Louise Balfour Bruce (11 November 1923 – 25 May 2019), married in 1956 Benjamin Coote Heywood
- Hon. Gwyneth Margaret Bruce (3 July 1928 – 26 October 2021), married in 1952 Robert McCheyne Andrew

Lady Aberdare died on 8 February 1950.

On 12 September 1957, Aberdare married his second wife, the film and radio actress Griselda Hervey, whose performances included Appointment with Fear. The National Portrait Gallery, London has one photograph of her taken by the Royal photographer Dudley Glanfield (ref. NPG 45487). She was the only daughter of Dudley Hervey.

== Death ==
Shortly after his second marriage, Lord Aberdare and his new wife drove to attend the 53rd Session of the IOC in Sofia, Bulgaria, held from 23 to 28 September. After the IOC meeting finished, they began driving home through Yugoslavia as part of their honeymoon. On 4 October 1957, their car left the road near Risan (now Montenegro) and fell into the Bay of Kotor. Aberdare, aged 72, drowned and his wife, aged 56, was injured.

The repatriation of Lord Aberdare's body was arranged by Sir John Lambert at the UK embassy in Belgrade; as coffins were not permitted on passenger flights, Lambert concealed Aberdare's body among the cellos of the Minneapolis Symphony Orchestra.

== External reading ==
- Portraits of Clarence Bruce, 3rd Baron Aberdare at the National Portrait Gallery, London

Peerage of the United Kingdom
Preceded by Henry Bruce	Baron Aberdare; 1929–1957; Member of the House of Lords (1929–1957)	Succeeded by Morys Bruce
