= Benjamin Bathurst, 2nd Viscount Bledisloe =

British barrister

The Right Honourable The Viscount Bledisloe QC

Member of the House of Lords
- Lord Temporal
- as a hereditary peer 3 July 1958 – 17 September 1979
- Preceded by: The 1st Viscount Bledisloe
- Succeeded by: The 3rd Viscount Bledisloe

Personal details
- Born: Benjamin Ludlow Bathurst; 2 October 1899
- Died: 17 September 1979 (aged 79)
- Party: Crossbench
- Spouse: Joan Krishaber
- Children: 2
- Parent(s): Charles Bathurst, 1st Viscount Bledisloe; Bertha Susan Lopes
- Education: Eton College; Magdalen College, Oxford

Benjamin Ludlow Bathurst, 2nd Viscount Bledisloe, QC (2 October 1899 – 17 September 1979), was a British barrister.

== Background and education ==
Born at Westbury, Wiltshire, Bledisloe was the eldest son of Charles Bathurst, 1st Viscount Bledisloe, and the Hon. Bertha Susan Lopes, daughter of Henry Lopes, 1st Baron Ludlow. He was educated at Eton and Magdalen College, Oxford. He was a distinguished rower at Oxford, helping the Magdalen crew win the Grand Challenge Cup at Henley in 1920.

== Career ==
In 1927, he was called to the Bar at the Inner Temple and Lincoln's Inn.

Bledisloe fought in the First World War and gained the rank of Second Lieutenant in the service of the Royal Artillery. He returned to military service during the Second World War, where he served as a Squadron Leader in the Royal Air Force. In 1956, he was appointed a bencher of Lincoln's Inn. Bathurst succeeded his father in the viscountcy in 1958. He was a regular contributor in the House of Lords, speaking 64 times between 1959 and 1979.

== Family ==
Lord Bledisloe married Joan, daughter of Otto Krishaber, on 2 June 1933. They had two sons:

- Christopher Hiley Ludlow Bathurst, 3rd Viscount Bledisloe (24 June 1934 – 12 May 2009)
- Hon. David Charles Lopes Bathurst (born 15 December 1937, died 1992)

Lord Bledisloe died in September 1979, aged 79, and was succeeded in the viscountcy by his eldest son. Lady Bledisloe died in December 1999.

Peerage of the United Kingdom
Preceded by Charles Bathurst	Viscount Bledisloe; 1958–1979	Succeeded by Christopher Bathurst
Preceded by Charles Bathurst	Baron Bledisloe; 1958–1979	Succeeded by Christopher Bathurst
