= Arthur Peters (British politician) =

British politician

Arthur Peters CBE JP (1867 – 22 March 1956), was a British Liberal Party politician who was previously Chief Agent of the Labour Party and finally Mayor of Croydon.

== Background ==
Peters was born in Steyning, Sussex, the youngest son of James Peters of Brighton. He was educated at Brighton Commercial School. In 1894 he married Annie Lowe of Blakeney, Gloucestershire.

== Political career ==
Peters started his political career as an Agent with the Liberal Party, along with Arthur Henderson. Like Henderson he left the Liberals to join the emerging Labour Party. He was the first National Agent to the Labour Party, appointed in 1908. He was a strong supporter of the suffragists and the National Union of Women's Suffrage Societies. He was also an advocate of Proportional representation. Following the outbreak of war in 1914, the Labour Party split between those like Henderson who supported the war and those like Ramsay MacDonald who opposed it. Peters sided with Henderson as a supporter of the war effort. From 1914-1917 he was Joint Honorary Secretary of the Parliamentary Recruiting Committee. In 1918 he was appointed a CBE.

In 1918, Peters chaired a Labour Party commission examining organisation and elections. He faced criticism from within the party for signing the nomination papers of the Liberal candidate for Croydon North at the 1918 general election, and left his post as agent after the election.

In 1921 he was appointed Deputy Housing Commissioner at the Ministry of Health, serving for two years. Back in 1916 he had been elected as a Councillor to Croydon County Borough Council and later he was elected an Alderman. He left the Labour Party and re-joined the Liberal Party and was actively involved as Honorary Secretary of the League of Liberal Trade Unionists and Co-operators. He was Liberal candidate for the Wimbledon division of Surrey at the 1929 General Election. He did not stand for parliament again. He served as a Justice of the peace. He served as Mayor of Croydon from 1935–37.

=== Electoral record ===
General Election 1929: Wimbledon
Party	Candidate	Votes	%	±%
Unionist	Sir John Cecil Power	21,902	53.4	
Labour	Thomas Braddock	9,924	24.2	
Liberal	Arthur Peters	9,202	22.4	n/a
Majority		11,978	29.2	
Turnout				
Unionist hold		Swing		

Party political offices
Preceded by New position	National Agent of the Labour Party; 1908 – 1918	Succeeded by Egerton P. Wake
