= Charles Bathurst, 1st Viscount Bledisloe =

British Conservative politician and colonial governor

The Right Honourable The Viscount Bledisloe GCMG KBE KStJ PC
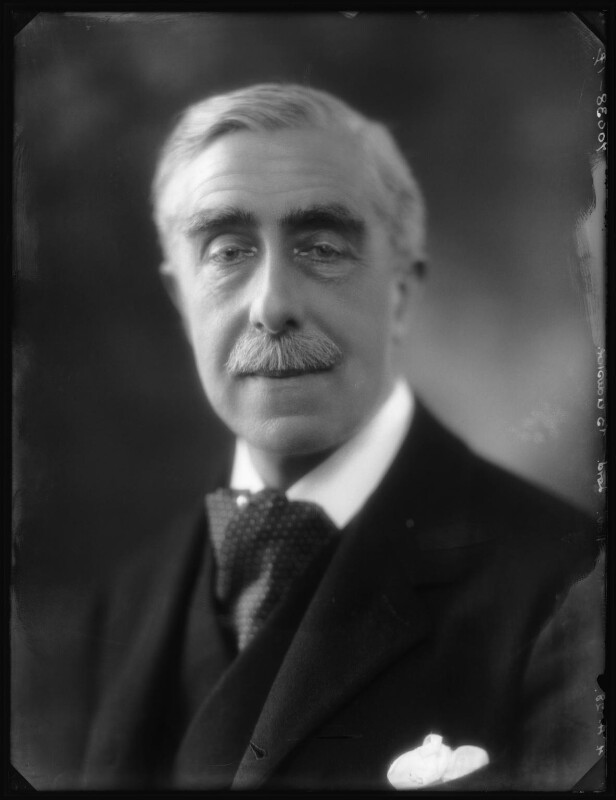

4th Governor-General of New Zealand
- In office 19 March 1930 – 15 March 1935
- Monarch: George V
- Prime Minister: Joseph Ward; George Forbes
- Preceded by: Sir Charles Fergusson
- Succeeded by: The Viscount Galway

Parliamentary Secretary to the Ministry of Agriculture and Fisheries
- In office 11 November 1924 – 5 February 1928
- Monarch: George V
- Prime Minister: Stanley Baldwin
- Preceded by: Walter Smith
- Succeeded by: The Earl of Stradbroke

Parliamentary Secretary to the Ministry of Food Control
- In office 12 December 1916 – 2 July 1917
- Monarch: George V
- Prime Minister: David Lloyd George
- Preceded by: Office established
- Succeeded by: John Robert Clynes

Member of the House of Lords Lord Temporal
- In office 15 October 1918 – 3 July 1958; Hereditary Peerage
- Preceded by: Peerage created
- Succeeded by: The 2nd Viscount Bledisloe

Member of Parliament for Wilton
- In office 15 January 1910 – 15 October 1918
- Preceded by: Levi Lapper Morse
- Succeeded by: Hugh Morrison

Personal details
- Born: 21 September 1867 London, England
- Died: 3 July 1958 (aged 90) Lydney, Gloucestershire, England
- Party: Conservative
- Spouse(s): Bertha Susan Lopes, Alina Kate Elaine Cooper-Smith
- Children: 3

Charles Bathurst, 1st Viscount Bledisloe, GCMG, KBE, KStJ, PC (21 September 1867 – 3 July 1958) was a British landowner, barrister, Conservative politician and government minister, and colonial governor. He was Governor-General of New Zealand from 1930 to 1935.

== Early life ==
Bathurst was born in London, the second son of Charles Bathurst, of Lydney Park, Gloucestershire, and Mary Elizabeth, daughter of Colonel Thomas Hay by Georgette Arnaud. He was educated at Sherborne School, Eton College and then University College, Oxford, where he graduated with a law degree in 1890. He then studied law and was admitted to the Inner Temple in 1892, when he gained a Master of Arts from Oxford. He was also called to the bar.

From 1893 to 1896, Bathurst was a student at the Royal Agricultural College, Cirencester. He inherited Lydney Park on the death of his father in 1907, his elder brother William Hay Bathurst having died in 1883.

== Member of Parliament and the First World War ==
Bathurst worked as a barrister and conveyancer. In 1910 he entered parliament representing the Conservative Party as MP for the South or Wilton division of Wiltshire. He served as Parliamentary Secretary to the Ministry of Food.

During the First World War of 1914–1918, Bathurst joined the Royal Engineers Special Reserves, and then served in Southern Command as Assistant Military Secretary at the War Office. He carried out the task of ensuring the country had a supply of sugar when asked to chair the Royal Commission on Sugar Supply until 1919. Bathurst was appointed a Knight Commander of the Order of the British Empire (KBE) in 1917, and raised to the peerage as Baron Bledisloe of Lydney in the County of Gloucester on 15 October 1918. He served as Parliamentary Secretary to the Ministry of Agriculture and Fisheries from 1924 to 1928. The following year Bristol University granted him an honorary Doctorate of Science. He served as a member of the Privy Council from 1926. Stanley Baldwin appointed Lord Bledisloe to chair the Royal Commission on Land Drainage, probably owing to his own experiences on the banks of the Severn in Gloucestershire. This was his last such honour before being posted overseas.

== Governor-General of New Zealand ==
Lord Bledisloe was appointed Governor-General of New Zealand in 1930. He was created a Knight Grand Cross of the Order of St Michael and St George and invested as a Knight of Grace of the Order of St John of Jerusalem at the same time. He served as Governor-General from 1930 until 1935, proving to be well liked and respected.

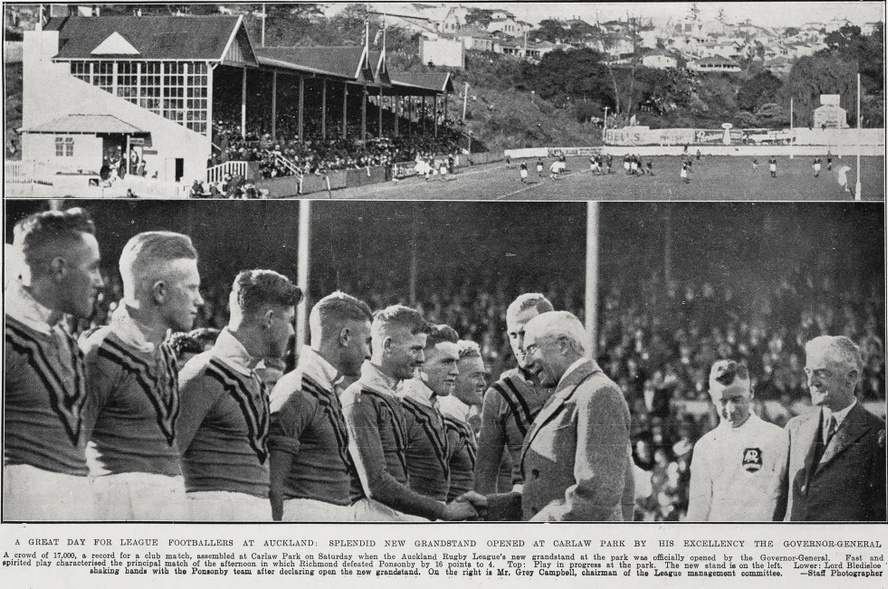
Lord Bledisloe at the opening of the new grandstand at Carlaw Park on 12 May 1934

His social conscience was much appreciated during the Depression era, as was his insistence that his salary should be cut as were the salaries of public servants at the time. Bledisloe also contributed to improved Pākehā–Māori relations, purchasing the site where the Treaty of Waitangi was signed and presenting it to the nation as a memorial. In 1934, the site was dedicated as a national reserve. The dedication ceremony attracted thousands of people, both Māori and Pākehā. Bledisloe continued to take an interest in the site even after his term expired and he returned to England. He also contributed to the recognition of the Māori King movement by developing a friendship with King Koroki and Te Puea Herangi, and his willingness to use the title "king" without reticence.

Bledisloe also promoted various causes and events by the presentation of trophies, notably the Bledisloe Cup, the trophy for an ongoing rugby union competition between New Zealand and Australia, first awarded in 1932, and currently contested annually. He also initiated the New Zealand Chess Federation inter-club championship trophy, also called the Bledisloe Cup.

Bledisloe was a freemason. During his term as governor-general, he was Grand Master of the Grand Lodge of New Zealand.

== Later life ==
In 1935, Bledisloe was awarded the King George V Silver Jubilee Medal, honorary doctorate of civil laws (DCL) from Oxford, and honorary doctorate of law (LLD) from Edinburgh. Upon returning to England he was elevated on 24 June 1935 to Viscount Bledisloe, of Lydney in the County of Gloucester. He continued to serve on a number of committees and councils, and was made a fellow of University College, Oxford and Pro-Vice Chancellor of Bristol. He received the King's Coronation Medal from George VI in 1937 and was admitted at the same time as Fellow of the Society of Antiquaries.

Bledisloe was a director of Lloyds Bank and the Australian Mutual Provident Society; and latterly also of the P & O Steamship Company.

Lord Bledisloe chaired the Bledisloe Commission, also known as the Rhodesia-Nyasaland Royal Commission, appointed in 1937–39 to examine the possible closer union of the three British territories in Central Africa: Southern Rhodesia, Northern Rhodesia and Nyasaland. These territories were to some degree economically inter-dependent, and it was suggested that an association would promote their rapid development. (The three territories would ultimately unite as the Federation of Rhodesia and Nyasaland in 1953.)

In 1943, he created the Empire Knowledge Trophies, a school competition to promote the British Empire to grammar and secondary technical schools. The competition was organized by the Gloucestershire Education Committee. Lord Blesdisloe himself often attended to present the prizes to the pupils.

On his 90th birthday he endowed the Bledisloe Gold Medal for Landowners of the Royal Agricultural Society of England, to be awarded annually for the application of science or technology to some branch of British husbandry.

Bledisloe died, aged 90, at Lydney on 3 July 1958, and was succeeded as Viscount Bledisloe by his eldest son, Benjamin Ludlow Bathurst.

== Family ==
Charles Bathurst married Hon Bertha Susan, daughter of Henry Lopes, 1st Baron Ludlow by Cordelia Clark. They had two sons and a daughter.

- Benjamin Ludlow, 2nd Viscount Bledisloe (1899–1979)
- Ursula Mary (1900–1975), married Horace Field Parshall Jr. (1903–1986) on 14 May 1929; divorced 1942
- Hon. Henry Charles Hiley (1904–1969)

Bertha died in 1926 and Bathurst remarried in 1928 to Alina Kate Elaine Cooper-Smith (née Jenkins), the daughter of Lord Glantawe. Alina died in 1956.

== Sports ==
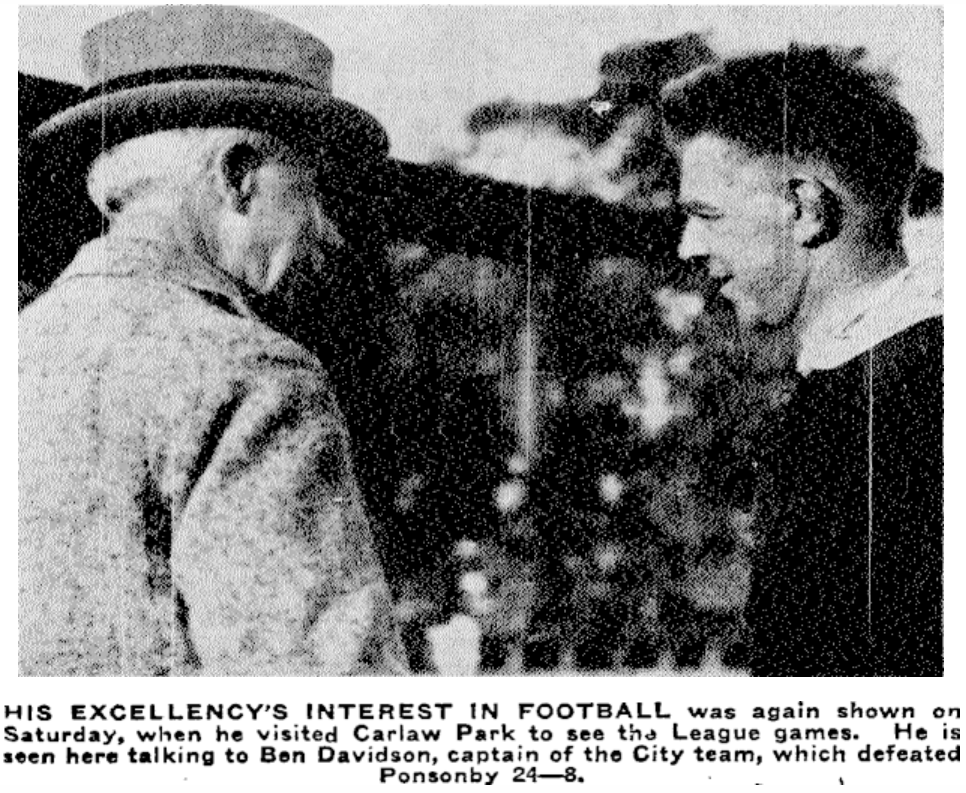

Upon its formation in 1888, Bathurst was invited to become President of Lydney Rugby Football Club. He held this position for 70 years until his death and was succeeded as by his eldest son, Benjamin. The Australia – New Zealand Bledisloe Cup, and Bledisloe Park sports ground in New Zealand, are named for Bledisloe.

== Styles ==
- 1867–1910: Charles Bathurst
- 1910–1914: Charles Bathurst, MP
- 1914–1917: Captain Charles Bathurst, MP
- 1917 – 24 October 1918: Captain Sir Charles Bathurst, KBE, MP
- 24 October 1918 – 1926: The Right Honourable The Lord Bledisloe, KBE
- 1926–1930: The Right Honourable The Lord Bledisloe, KBE, PC
- 1930 – 1 January 1935: His Excellency The Right Honourable The Lord Bledisloe, GCMG, KBE, PC
- 1 January – 28 June 1935: The Right Honourable The Lord Bledisloe, GCMG, KBE, PC, KStJ
- 28 June 1935 – 1958: The Right Honourable The Viscount Bledisloe, GCMG, KBE, PC, KStJ

== Arms ==
Coat of arms of Charles Bathurst, 1st Viscount Bledisloe
| Notes The arms of Charles Bathurst consist of: (Carved depiction) Crest A dexter arm in mail enbowed, holding in the hand all Proper, a club with spike Or. Escutcheon Sable two bars ermine, in chief three cross-patée Or. Supporters On either side a bull guardant Gules, ringed, and a line therefrom reflexed over the back Or. Motto Tien ta foy (Keep thy faith) |

Parliament of the United Kingdom
| Preceded by Levi Lapper Morse | Member of Parliament for Wilton; 1910–1918 | Succeeded by Hugh Morrison |
Government offices
| Preceded by Sir Charles Fergusson | Governor-General of New Zealand; 1930–1935 | Succeeded by The Viscount Galway |
Sporting positions
| New office | President of Lydney Rugby Football Club; 1888–1958 | Succeeded by Benjamin Bathurst |
Peerage of the United Kingdom
| New creation | Viscount Bledisloe; 1935–1958 | Succeeded by Benjamin Bathurst |
| New creation | Baron Bledisloe; 1918–1958 | Succeeded by Benjamin Bathurst |
