= House of Lords Act 1999 =

Act of the Parliament of the United Kingdom removing hereditary peerages

House of Lords Act 1999 (Note: Section 6(2).)
- Act of Parliament
- Parliament of the United Kingdom
- Long title: An Act to restrict membership of the House of Lords by virtue of a hereditary peerage; to make related provision about disqualifications for voting at elections to and for membership of the House of Commons and for related purposes.
- Citation: 1999 c. 34
- Introduced by: Margaret Beckett, Leader of the House of Commons (Commons); Baroness Jay of Paddington, Leader of the House of Lords (Lords)
- Territorial extent: United Kingdom

Dates
- Royal assent: 11 November 1999
- Commencement: 11 November 1999 (Note: Section 4(b) of the Interpretation Act 1978.)
Other legislation
Amends	Peerage Act 1963; Recess Elections Act 1975
Amended by	Constitutional Reform and Governance Act 2010; House of Lords Reform Act 2014; House of Lords (Hereditary Peers) Act 2026

Status: Amended

Text of statute as originally enacted

Revised text of statute as amended

The House of Lords Act 1999 (c. 34) is an act of the Parliament of the United Kingdom which reformed the House of Lords, one of the chambers of Parliament. The act was given royal assent on 11 November 1999. For centuries, the House of Lords had included several hundred members who inherited their seats (hereditary peers). The act removed this as a right, but as part of a compromise allowed 92 hereditary peers to remain in the House until further reforms. Another ten were created life peers to enable them to remain in the House.

The act decreased the membership of the House from 1,330 in October 1999 to 669 in March 2000. As another result of the act, the majority of the Lords were thence life peers, whose numbers had been gradually increasing since the Life Peerages Act 1958. As of June 2023, there were 796 members of the House of Lords, of whom 25 were senior Church of England bishops, whose representation in the House is governed by the Lords Spiritual (Women) Act 2015.

== Background ==
Prior to the 16th century, the Lords was the more powerful of the two houses of Parliament. A series of developments, including such moments of crisis as the English Civil War, gradually shifted the political control of England, first from the Crown to the House of Lords and then to the House of Commons. The rising wealth of the Commons eventually allowed it to wage two civil wars, dethrone two kings, and gradually reduce the power of the Lords. Prior to the House of Lords Act 1999, the power of the Lords had been diminished by the Parliament Acts 1911 and 1949 which deprived the Lords of the ability to veto most bills; at most it could delay bills for one year. Furthermore, the Commons have absolute power over money bills.

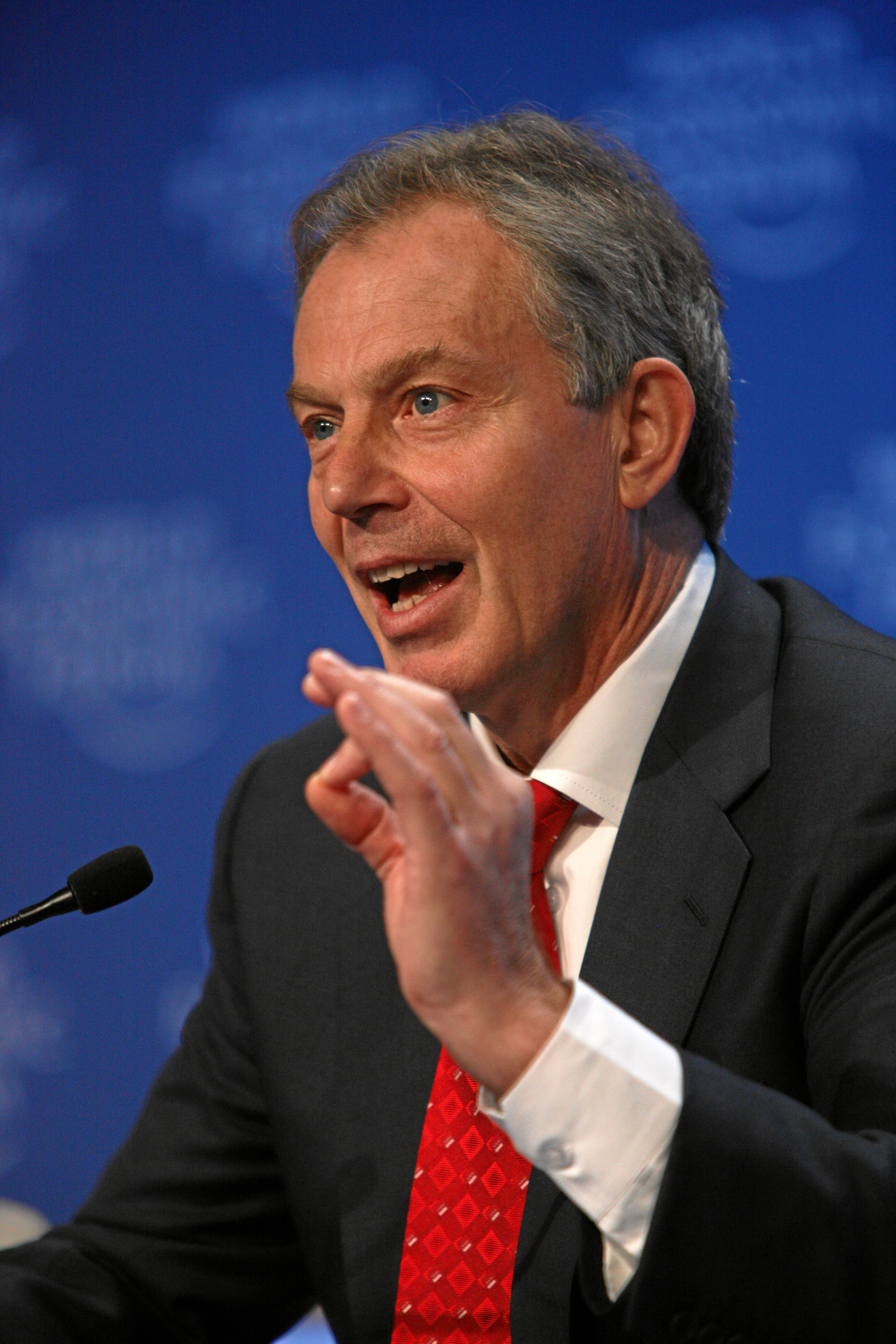
Tony Blair, Prime Minister of the United Kingdom (1997–2007)

After eighteen years of Conservative government, the Labour Party led by Tony Blair won a landslide victory at the 1997 general election, inflicting the biggest defeat for the Conservatives since 1832. The Labour Party had for years endorsed abolition of the House of Lords in its election platforms, though since 1992 this had changed to a policy of reforming the House instead of such a drastic constitutional change.

During the 20th century, Liberal and Labour governments proposed many bills that were opposed by the House of Lords, which had been dominated by Conservatives since the 1890s, leading to some delay and, where proposed before elections, their dropping from the legislative agenda. In the first year of the Blair government, the Lords passed back Government bills 38 times. The rejection considered the most contentious was that of the European Elections Bill, against which the Lords voted five times. Blair stated that the Conservatives were using the hereditary peers to "frustrate" and "overturn the will of the democratically elected House of Commons". Here Blair found an opportunity to implement one of Labour's campaign promises, reforming the Lords.

On 24 November 1998, in opening the second session of Parliament, Queen Elizabeth II delivered her annual Speech from the Throne; the speech was written for her by the government and outlines its legislative agenda for the forthcoming year. In it, she stated that her government would pursue a reform of the House of Lords. These remarks were followed by loud mumbles of "Hear! Hear!" from supportive Labour Members of Parliament, which led to similar utterances of "Shame! Shame!" from Conservative peers; such outbursts were unprecedented, as the Queen's speech is usually heard by a silent Parliament.

== Bill ==
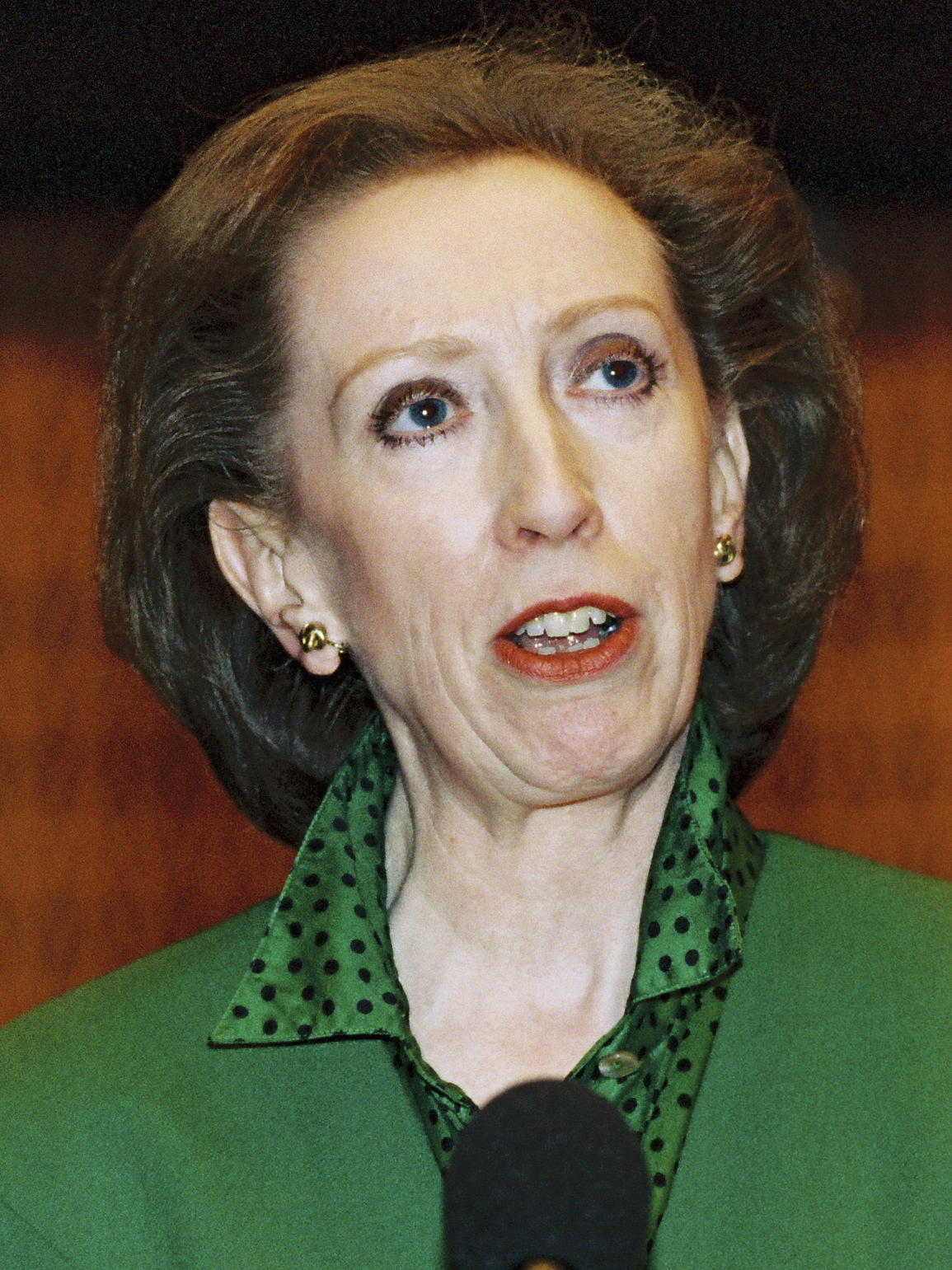
Margaret Beckett, Leader of the House of Commons, introduced the Bill

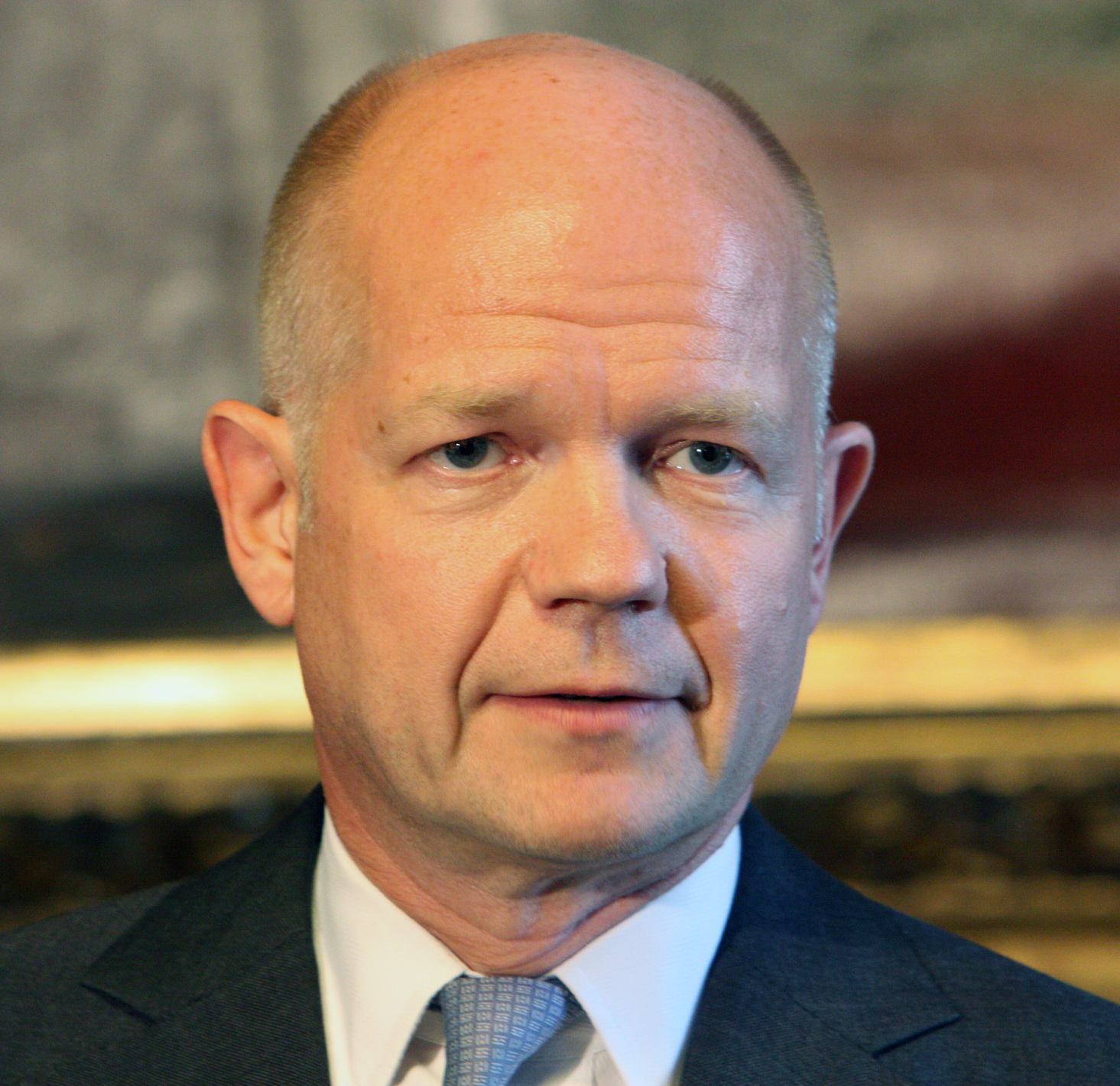
William Hague, the Conservative Leader of the Opposition, led the opposition to the act

The House of Lords Bill was expected to face a tough fight in the House of Lords. Several Lords threatened to disrupt the Government's other bills if they continued with the plan to abolish the hereditaries' right to sit in the House of Lords. Michael Onslow, 7th Earl of Onslow, for instance, said, "I'm happy to force a division on each and every clause of the Scotland Bill. Each division takes 20 minutes and there are more than 270 clauses."

Stuart Randall, Baron Randall of St Budeaux put forward the idea of phasing out the hereditary peers by disqualifying their heirs.

Margaret Jay, Baroness Jay of Paddington reminded the House that under the Salisbury Convention they could not block the bill.

In order to convince some peers to vote for reform, Tony Blair announced that he would compromise by allowing a number of hereditary peers to remain in the House of Lords on an interim basis. On 2 December 1998, the Conservative Leader of the Opposition, William Hague, rose in the House of Commons to attack Blair's plans. He suggested that Blair's changes indicated his lack of principles, claiming that Blair wanted to turn the House of Lords into a "House of Cronies". Hague further suggested that the Conservative Party would never agree to such constitutional reforms that were "based on no comprehensive plan or principle." Hague's remarks backfired when Blair revealed that the Conservative Party in the House of Lords, rather than oppose his reforms, would definitely support them, and that he had done a secret deal with the Conservative leader in the House of Lords, Robert Gascoyne-Cecil, Viscount Cranborne. Hague immediately removed Cranborne from office, but, in protest, several Conservative Lords who held front-bench positions resigned.

On 19 January 1999, the Leader of the House of Commons, Margaret Beckett, introduced the House of Lords Bill into the House of Commons. The House of Commons passed the bill by a vote of 340 to 132 on 16 March. The next day it was presented to the House of Lords, where debate on the bill was far longer. One significant amendment made to the Bill was the so-called Weatherill Amendment, named after Bernard Weatherill, Lord Weatherill, the former Speaker of the House of Commons. The Weatherill Amendment put into place the deal agreed to by the Prime Minister and Viscount Cranborne, and allowed 92 hereditary peers to remain members of the House of Lords.

Several controversies relating to the technicalities of the bill were brought up in the House of Lords. One issue regarded the language used in clauses 1 to 7, which was described by Patrick Mayhew, Lord Mayhew of Twysden as "uncertain in its effects and would leave the position of most hereditary Peers uncertain if the Bill was enacted." A second issue was related to the Acts of Union 1707 uniting Scotland and England into the Kingdom of Great Britain. After lengthy debates, both matters were referred to the House of Lords Committee on Privileges.

Under the Acts of Union 1707, Scottish Lords would be entitled to elect 16 Scottish representative peers to sit on their Lordships' behalf in the House of Lords. In 1963, the Peerage Act 1963 was passed, allowing all Scottish peers to sit in the House, not just 16 of them. It was felt that removing all Scottish representation would breach the Articles. The Government, however, responded that the Articles did envisage a change in the election of representative peers. It was argued that some portions of the Treaty were entrenched, while others were not. For instance, Scotland and England were united "forever," the Scottish Court of Session was to "remain in all time coming within Scotland as it is now constituted," and the establishment of the Church of Scotland was "effectually and unalterably secured." However, it was suggested, the election of Scottish representative peers was not entrenched, and therefore could be amended. Furthermore, the Government argued that Parliament was entirely sovereign and supreme, and could at its will change the Articles of Union. For example, the Treaty of Union joining Great Britain and Ireland required that the two nations be united "forever". Nonetheless, in 1922, by an act of Parliament, most of Ireland was made independent as the Irish Free State. Thus, even entrenched clauses were argued to be open to amendment by the authority of Parliament. The Committee agreed and reported to the House on 20 October 1999 that the Bill was indeed lawful in this regard.

After the Committee's first and second reports were considered, the Lords passed the bill 221 to 81 on 26 October 1999. During the session, Charles Beauclerk, Earl of Burford, son of the Duke of St Albans, launched a protest at the constitutional implications of the bill while standing on the Woolsack, and was ejected from the chamber. Once the Lords settled the differences between their version of the bill and the Commons version, the Bill received royal assent on 11 November 1999 and became an act of Parliament. The act came into force the same day.

== Membership of the House of Lords ==
The House of Lords Act 1999 first provides that "No-one shall be a member of the House of Lords by virtue of an hereditary peerage." (The act treats the Principality of Wales and the Earldom of Chester as hereditary peerages.) The act then provides that 92 peers, including the Earl Marshal, the Lord Great Chamberlain and 90 other peers elected in accordance with the Standing Orders of the House, would be excepted from the exclusion of hereditary peers, and that after the first session of the next Parliament, whenever one of those seats fell vacant, the Lords would have to proceed to a by-election. The act also provided that a hereditary peer would be entitled to vote in elections for, and sit in, the House of Commons, unless he or she was a member of the House of Lords. Previously, hereditary peers had been constitutionally disqualified from participating in elections to the House of Commons. The first hereditary peer to gain a seat in the Commons under this provision was John Sinclair, 3rd Viscount Thurso.

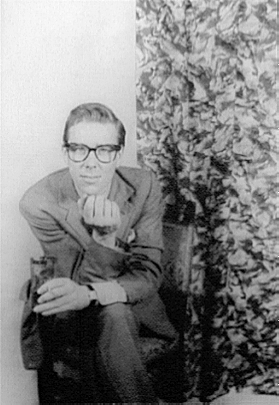
Antony Armstrong-Jones, 1st Earl of Snowdon, was made a life peer in 1999

The act prevents even hereditary peers who are the first to hold their titles from sitting automatically in the House of Lords; however, the Government gave life peerages to all three living non-royal hereditary peers of first creation (Low, Erroll and Pakenham were the only living non-royal hereditary peers of first creation as of November 1999; see the lists of hereditary peerages) and also offered life peerages to the royal peers (of whom only the Earl of Snowdon accepted):

Name	Hereditary peerage	Life peerage	Died or left house
Toby Low	Baron Aldington	Baron Low	2000
Frederick Erroll	Baron Erroll of Hale	Baron Erroll of Kilmun	2000
Antony Armstrong-Jones	Earl of Snowdon	Baron Armstrong-Jones	2016
Francis Pakenham	Baron Pakenham (Note: Pakenham was created Baron Pakenham in 1945 in his own right. When his brother Edward Pakenham, 6th Earl of Longford died in 1961, he inherited the Earldom of Longford which, being an Irish peerage, did not carry an entitlement to a seat in House of Lords. He had sat in the House as either as Baron Pakenham or as Baron Silchester, a title was created for Thomas Pakenham, 2nd Earl of Longford in 1821.)	Baron Pakenham of Cowley	2001

David Eccles, 1st Viscount Eccles, died 24 February 1999, and William Whitelaw, 1st Viscount Whitelaw, died on 1 July 1999; had they lived longer, they would have been eligible as first holders of their hereditary peerages.

Additionally, life peerages were created for all living former Leaders of the House of Lords who were hereditary peers (Quintin Hogg already held a life peerage since 1970):

Name	Leader of the House	Hereditary peerage	Life peerage	Died/Left House	Ref
Quintin Hogg	1960–1963	Viscount Hailsham (disclaimed in 1963)	Baron Hailsham of St Marylebone (1970)	2001	
Peter Carington	1963–1964	Baron Carrington	Baron Carington of Upton	2018	
Francis Pakenham	1964–1968	Baron Pakenham	Baron Pakenham of Cowley	2001	
George Jellicoe	1970–1973	Earl Jellicoe	Baron Jellicoe of Southampton	2007	
David Hennessy	1973–1974	Baron Windlesham	Baron Hennessy	2010	
Malcolm Shepherd	1974–1976	Baron Shepherd	Baron Shepherd of Spalding	2001	
John Ganzoni	1988–1990	Baron Belstead	Baron Ganzoni	2005	
Robert Gascoyne-Cecil	1994–1997	Viscount Cranborne	Baron Gascoyne-Cecil	2017	

Lord Whitelaw, mentioned above, would also have been eligible as a former Leader of the House of Lords 1983–1988.

The following hereditary peers who had been created life peers remained in the House after the act was passed, they were:

Name	Hereditary peerage	Life peerage	Died/Left House
Michael Berry	Viscount Camrose (disclaimed in 1995)	Baron Hartwell (1968)	2000
Robert Lindsay	Earl of Crawford and Balcarres	Baron Balniel (1975)	2019
George Younger	Viscount Younger of Leckie	Baron Younger of Prestwick (1992)	2003
James Douglas-Hamilton	Earl of Selkirk (disclaimed in 1994)	Baron Selkirk of Douglas (1997)	2023

Life peerages were also offered to members of the royal family with new hereditary peerages, but were declined, as this would have meant they would continue to hold seats in the reformed House of Lords: Prince Philip, Duke of Edinburgh; Charles, Prince of Wales; Prince Andrew, Duke of York; and Prince Edward (who was created Earl of Wessex on his wedding day).

=== First election to the House of Lords ===
Before the granting of Royal Assent, the Lords had adopted a Standing Order making provision for the election of those hereditary peers who would remain members of the House under section 2 of the act. The Order provided that there be elected:

- two peers by the Labour hereditary peers
- three peers by the Liberal Democrat hereditary peers
- 28 peers by the Crossbench hereditary peers
- 42 peers by the Conservative hereditary peers
- 15 peers, ready to serve as Deputy Speakers and in other offices, by the whole House of Lords

The elections for officers of the House were held on 27 and 28 October 1999, while those for peers elected by party were held on 3 and 4 November; the results were proclaimed to the House on 29 October and 5 November. Voters were required to rank candidates in order of preference for the number of seats available, with the candidates receiving the greatest number of votes, without regard to the ranking on the ballots, so in effect block voting, declared elected. Only if there were ties would the ranking be examined. Thereafter, until November 2002, if a vacancy occurred, the next-highest placed unsuccessful candidate in the original election would fill the seat. Following the deaths of the Earl of Carnarvon in 2000 and Baroness Wharton in 2001, Lord Cobbold and Lord Chorley became eligible to take their respective seats in the House.

=== Subsequent by-elections ===
Since November 2002, by-elections have been held to fill vacancies. Two by-elections were held in 2003, one in 2004, four in 2005, one in each of 2007, 2008 and 2009, two in 2010, four in 2011, two in 2013, four in 2014, six in 2015, two in 2016, two in 2017, three in 2018, two in 2019, five in 2021, six in 2022, and three in 2023. Voting is by preferential voting, with peers ranking the candidates in order of preference. As many or as few preferences as desired may be indicated. To win the election, a peer must receive at least one half of the available votes. If no candidate receives this number of first preference votes, the candidate with the fewest first preference votes is eliminated, with each of their votes being redistributed according to the second preference marked on the ballot (see instant-runoff voting). The process is continued until one candidate receives at least one half of the remaining votes.

== Subsequent reform proposals ==
=== Labour proposals to remove remaining hereditary peers (until 2009) ===
The Labour Government expected eventually to present a bill for a second stage of House of Lords reform based on Lord Steel's earlier bills, which aimed to remove the remaining 92 hereditary peers; the history of such attempts between 1997 and 2009 is set out in a report in The Guardian. Proposals called The House of Lords: Reform were published by order of the House on 1 January 2007, with a foreword by Jack Straw. In 2009, Labour introduced the Constitutional Reform and Governance Bill, which would have ended the by-elections to fill vacancies for hereditary peers, thereby removing them through attrition. However, these elements were dropped from the bill entirely, along with other clauses relating to the expulsion and resignation of peers from the House of Lords.

=== 2012 coalition bill electing all Lords and halving their number ===
The coalition government of David Cameron (Conservatives) and Nick Clegg (Liberal Democrats), inaugurated in 2010, had plans to reform the House of Lords by making it mostly elected and slashing its size. Deputy Prime Minister and Liberal Democrat leader Nick Clegg spearheaded the push to bring in the changes. The government wanted four-fifths of members of a reformed House of Lords to be elected. They would have served 15-year terms of office, after which they could not run for re-election. The number of peers was to be almost halved, from 826 to 450. The chamber would have kept the title of House of Lords, after names like Senate and Reformed House were rejected. Peers were each to represent a specific region of the United Kingdom, as constituted for the election of Members of the European Parliament. One-third of seats would have been filled by elections held every five years. Of the remaining 90 members, 12—rather than the current 26—would have been Church of England bishops. The remainder were to continue to be appointed, and all hereditary peers were to be removed. The government had scheduled passage of its bill for the spring of 2013, and the elections were to have taken place in 2015, but the effort stalled when in July 2012, 91 Conservatives in the Commons rebelled against the government in a vote on how to timetable the House of Lords Reform Bill. In August 2012, the coalition's plans were dropped.

=== 2014 and 2015 reform acts ===
The House of Lords Reform Act 2014 allows peers to retire or resign, to be expelled for serious criminal offences, or to be removed for non-attendance during a whole session. The act came out of a concern with the size of the chamber; a year later, in May 2015 membership stood at 787 with an additional 31 on a leave of absence. It was presented by Dan Byles and based on earlier bills which Lord Steel had attempted to pass through parliament. The House of Lords (Expulsion and Suspension) Act 2015 authorised the House of Lords to expel or suspend a member for serious misconduct; expelled members are permanently barred from returning to the House. Unlike the 2014 Act, members did not have to have been sentenced to at least a year's imprisonment in order to be expelled for misconduct. The act was introduced by Baroness Hayman to address the "narrow" circumstances for expulsion set out in the 2014 Act.

=== Final attempts to phase out hereditary peers ===
An amendment to the 1999 Act was proposed by Labour peer Lord Grocott to abolish by-elections, but was filibustered in 2016 by Conservative hereditary peer Lord Trefgarne.

The remaining hereditary peers were excluded from the Lords by the House of Lords (Hereditary Peers) Act 2026.

== See also ==
- Reform of the House of Lords
- Roll of the Peerage
- List of excepted hereditary peers
- List of hereditary peers removed under the House of Lords Act 1999
