= Harries =

Harries is a Welsh surname. For the meaning and origins of the name refer to Harris (surname). Notable people with the surname include:

- Andy Harries (born 1954), British producer
- Arthur Trevor Harries (1892–1959), British Indian judge
- Axel Harries (born 1964), German runner
- Carl Dietrich Harries (1866–1923), German chemist
- Cian Harries (born 1997), Welsh footballer
- Dan Harries (born 1963), American artist and professor
- Davyd Harries (born 1937), Welsh actor
- D. C. Harries (died 1940), Welsh photographer
- Douglas Harries (1893–1972), Royal Air Force officer and cricketer
- Emma Harries (born 2002), English footballer
- Finn Harries (born 1993), British YouTube personality, brother of Jack Harries
- George Herbert Harries (1866–1934), American general and businessman of Welsh origin
- Gwennan Harries (born 1988), Welsh footballer
- Heinrich Harries (1762–1802), German theologian
- Hu Harries (1921–1986), Canadian economist and politician
- Jack Harries (born 1993), YouTube personality known for his channel Jacksgap
- Jason Harries (born 1989), Welsh rugby union player
- Jenny Harries (born 1958), English public health physician
- Jill Harries, professor emerita of ancient history at the University of St Andrews
- Julian Harries, British actor and playwright
- Karsten Harries (born 1937), German philosopher and professor
- Kathryn Harries (1951–2023), British operatic soprano
- Lauren Charlotte Harries (born 1978), disputed British child prodigy
- Mali Harries (born 1976), Welsh actress and presenter
- Owen Harries (1930–2020), Australian academic and intellectual
- Paul Harries (born 1977), Australian professional footballer
- Philip Harries (born 1966), British athlete
- Raymond Harries (1916–1950), Royal Air Force pilot in World War II
- Richard Harries, Baron Harries of Pentregarth (1936–2026), British army officer and Bishop of Oxford, England
- Sian Harries, Welsh writer and actor
- Sioned Harries (born 1989), Welsh rugby union player
- Sir Thomas Harries, 1st Baronet (1550–1628), English lawyer
- Susie Harries (born 1951), British historian and academic
- Toby Harries (born 1998), British sprinter
- Tom Rhys Harries (born 1990), Welsh actor
- Thomas M. Harries (1888–?), Scottish World War I flying ace
- Will Harries (born 1987), Welsh rugby union player
- William Henry Harries (1843–1921), American politician and U.S. Representative
- William Matthew Harries (1797–1865), British settler and parliamentarian

== See also ==
- Harries graph
- Harries–Wong graph
- Harries, Ohio
- Harris
- Harriss
- Herries
