= Lady Sarah Clutton =

British aristocrat and philanthropist

- Born: Lady Sarah Margaret Fitzalan-Howard; 23 September 1941; Arundel, Sussex
- Died: 14 June 2015 (aged 73)
- Spouse: Nigel Clutton (m. 1988)
- Parents: Bernard Fitzalan-Howard, 16th Duke of Norfolk (father); The Hon. Lavinia Strutt (mother)
- Family: Fitzalan-Howard family

Lady Sarah Margaret Clutton (née Fitzalan-Howard; 23 September 1941 – 14 June 2015) was a British aristocrat and philanthropist. She was a member of the prominent Roman Catholic Howard family headed by the Duke of Norfolk.

== Early life and family ==
Lady Sarah was born in September 1941 at Arundel Castle, Sussex, the third of four daughters of Bernard Fitzalan-Howard, 16th Duke of Norfolk and The Hon. Lavinia Strutt. She was christened on 5 October 1941 at the castle's private chapel. Her godparents were her aunt the Lady Winefride Howard, Zara Strutt, Gerald Constable-Maxwell and the Hon. Charles Wood.

She had two older sisters, Lady Anne (1938–2014), and Lady Mary (1940–2017), and one younger sister, Lady Jane (born 1945). She grew up at the family seat Arundel Castle in West Sussex.

In 1943, Lady Sarah and her family posed for Cecil Beaton at Arundel Castle in a series of portraits now in the National Portrait Gallery.

In 1975, upon her father's death without a son, the dukedom of Norfolk and his other Howard titles passed to his distant male cousin. However, her elder sister Lady Anne inherited the lordship of Herries of Terregles, a title in the Peerage of Scotland that could pass through the female line. The Duke had inherited it through his mother Gwendolen Fitzalan-Howard, Duchess of Norfolk, who was suo jure 12th Lady Herries of Terregles. After Anne's death in 2014, title was subsequently held by their sister Lady Mary; Lady Sarah died before she could inherit the title, which since Lady Mary's death in 2017 has been held by their younger sister, Jane, Marchioness of Lothian and 16th Lady Herries.

== Career ==
From 1978 until 2011, Lady Sarah was director of the Roman Catholic Diocese of Arundel and Brighton's pilgrimage to the Sanctuary of Our Lady of Lourdes.

She played a key role in the founding of Chestnut Tree House, the children's hospice for Sussex and South East Hampshire, and served as president. She providing a 125-year lease for the hospice, with an annual rent of one dozen mixed lilies and £1 coin on her birthday.

She succeeded her mother as president of St Barnabas House Hospice in Worthing upon the latter's death in 1996.

== Marriage and death ==
On 25 March 1988, she married Nigel Hugh Clutton. Lady Sarah Clutton died at home on 14 June 2015 at the age of 73. A private funeral was held and a memorial mass at Arundel Cathedral on 23 September. A memorial orchard at Chestnut Tree House was unveiled by her husband in 2017.
