= Herries =

Herries is a surname. For the meaning and origins of this name please refer to Harris (surname). Notable people with the surname include:

- Lord Herries of Terregles, a title in the Peerage of Scotland
  - Herbert Herries, 1st Lord Herries of Terregles (c.1460–after 1503), Scottish landowner
- John Charles Herries (1778–1855), English politician and financier
- Sir Michael Herries (1923–1995), British businessman, chairman of Jardine Matheson and of the Royal Bank of Scotland
- Sir William Herries (1859–1923), English-born New Zealand politician
- Herries Chronicle, a series of historical romances by Hugh Walpole

== See also ==
- Herrys, surname
- Harries
- Harris
- Harriss
- Gordon Leslie Herries Davies (1932–2019), British geographer and historian of geography and geology
