= Harriss =

Harriss is a surname. For the meaning and origins of this name please refer to Harris (surname). Notable people with the surname include:

- Charles A. E. Harriss (1862–1929), English then Canadian composer, impresario, educator, organist-choirmaster, conductor
- Cynthia Harriss, American retail and tourism industry executive
- Edmund Harriss (b. 1976), British mathematician and artist
- Gerald Leslie Harriss (1925–2014), English historian of the Late Middle Ages
- Julian Harriss (1914–1989), American director of public relations for University of Tennessee
- Paul Harriss (1954–2022), independent member of the Tasmanian Legislative Council of Huon, Australia
- Slim Harriss (1896–1963), American pitcher who played in Major League Baseball

== See also ==
- Harries
- Harris
- Herries
