= Jane Kerr, Marchioness of Lothian =

British aristocrat (born 1945)

The Most Honourable The Dowager Marchioness of Lothian
- Born: Lady Theresa Jane Fitzalan-Howard; 24 January 1945 (age 81)
- Spouse: Michael Kerr, 13th Marquess of Lothian (m. 1975; died 2024)
- Children: Lady Sarah Kerr; Lady Clare Hurd; Lady Mary Adler
- Parents: Bernard Fitzalan-Howard, 16th Duke of Norfolk (father); The Hon. Lavinia Strutt (mother)
- Family: Fitzalan-Howard family

Theresa Jane Kerr, Dowager Marchioness of Lothian, Baroness Kerr of Monteviot, 16th Lady Herries of Terregles (née Fitzalan-Howard; born 24 January 1945) is a British aristocrat and philanthropist. She is the widow of the 13th Marquess of Lothian. In 2017, she inherited the Scottish title Lady Herries of Terregles from her sister, Mary, thus making her and her husband one of few couples who each held an hereditary peerage in their own right.

== Life ==
Born Lady Jane Fitzalan-Howard on 24 January 1945, she is the youngest of four daughters of Bernard Fitzalan-Howard, 16th Duke of Norfolk and The Hon. Lavinia Strutt. She is a member of the ancient Fitzalan-Howard family, one of the most prominent noble families and most high-profile recusant families in England. She grew up at the Fitzalan-Howard's family seat, Arundel Castle, in West Sussex. Her elder sisters were: Anne Cowdrey, 14th Lady Herries of Terregles, Mary Mumford, 15th Lady Herries of Terregles, and Lady Sarah Clutton.

On 7 June 1975, Lady Jane married Michael Kerr, Earl of Ancram, a Conservative Member of Parliament and son and heir of Peter Kerr, 12th Marquess of Lothian. Her husband succeeded to his father's peerages in 2004. They resided at Monteviot House. Lord and Lady Lothian had three daughters and two grandchildren: Her husband died on 1 October 2024, following a short illness.

- Lady Sarah Margaret Kerr (born and died 13 June 1976).
- Lady Clare Therese Kerr (born 25 January 1979); married Nick Hurd in 2010, had issue.
- Lady Mary Cecil Kerr (born 28 May 1981); married Zackary Adler on 28 May 2016, had issue.

In 2017, on the death of her elder sister, she inherited the ancient Scottish peerage, the Lordship of Herries of Terregles, which her father had inherited from his mother, Gwendolen, Duchess of Norfolk (and 12th Lady Herries of Terregles). Her eldest surviving daughter, Lady Clare, is her heiress presumptive. Lady Lothian is a patron of the Right to Life Trust and a patroness of the Royal Caledonian Ball.

Peerage of Scotland
Preceded by Mary Mumford	Lady Herries of Terregles; 2017–present	Incumbent; Heiress presumptive: Lady Clare Hurd
