= Algernon Strutt, 3rd Baron Belper =

British peer (1883-1956)

Algernon Henry Strutt 3rd Baron Belper
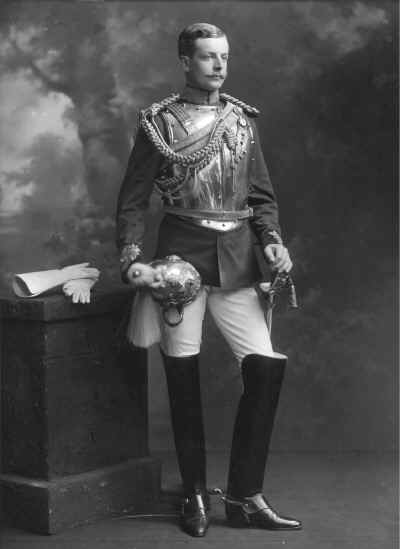
- 3rd Baron Belper, photographed in 1907
- Born: 6 May 1883; Nottinghamshire, England
- Died: 20 May 1956 (aged 73)
- Occupations: Soldier & peer
- Spouse(s): Eva Primrose, Countess of Rosebery (m. 1911; div. 1922) Angela Mariota Tollemache (m. 1923)
- Children: 5
- Parents: Henry Strutt, 2nd Baron Belper (father); Lady Margaret Coke (mother)
- Relatives: Henry Bruce, 2nd Baron Aberdare (father-in-law); Ronald Strutt (son); Lavinia Strutt (daughter); Edward Strutt, 1st Baron Belper (paternal grandfather)
- Military career
- Allegiance: United Kingdom
- Branch: British Army
- Service years: 1908-1918
- Rank: Lieutenant
- Unit: 2nd Life Guards
- Conflicts: World War I

Algernon Henry Strutt, 3rd Baron Belper (6 May 1883 – 20 May 1956), was 3rd Baron Belper from 1914 to 1956.

He entered the British Army in August 1908 and gained the rank of Lieutenant in the service of the 2nd Life Guards. He succeeded to the title of 3rd Baron Belper, of Belper, on 26 July 1914. He served with 13th Tank Battalion from its formation until 31 Jul 1918. He held the office of Deputy Lieutenant of Nottinghamshire.

== Family ==
He was the son of Henry Strutt, 2nd Baron Belper, and Lady Margaret Coke. He married Eva Isabel Marion Bruce, daughter of Major Henry Bruce, 2nd Baron Aberdare, and Constance Beckett on 26 April 1911 in St. Margaret's, Westminster. The couple were divorced in 1922 after having three children:

- Alexander Ronald George Strutt, 4th Baron Belper (1912–1999); married Zara Sophie Kathleen Mary Mainwaring, daughter of Sir Henry Mainwaring, 5th Baronet, and Generis Williams-Bulkeley, on 15 November 1940. Divorced 1949.
- Michael Strutt (1914 – 25 August 1942); married Arielle Frazer, daughter of Joseph W. Frazer, on 15 July 1939. Killed with Prince George, Duke of Kent, in a flying accident on active service as the Dukes equerry.
- Lavinia Mary Strutt (1916–1995); married Bernard Fitzalan-Howard, 16th Duke of Norfolk, son of Henry Fitzalan-Howard, 15th Duke of Norfolk, and Gwendoline Herries, Baroness Herries of Terregles, on 27 January 1937.

Secondly he married Angela Mariota Tollemache, daughter of Alfred Tollemache and Alice Head, on 12 July 1923. There were two children from this marriage:

- Peter Algernon Strutt (18 June 1924 – 27 October 2007) married Gay Mary Fison, daughter of Sir Frank Fison and Evelyn Bland, on 10 January 1953. He gained the Military Cross when serving with the Coldstream Guards in 1945.
- Desmond Rupert Strutt (17 June 1926 – 27 February 1993) married Jean Felicity Erskine, daughter of Captain Francis Erskine and Phyllis Burstall, on 10 July 1951. Divorced 1961. Married secondly Lucy Gwendolen Stirling-Home-Drummond-Moray, daughter of Major James Stirling-Home-Drummond-Moray, 21st of Abercairny, and Jeanetta Montagu Douglas Scott, on 11 July 1964.

Peerage of the United Kingdom
Preceded by Henry Strutt	Baron Belper; 1914–1956	Succeeded by Ronald Strutt
