= Henry Bruce, 2nd Baron Aberdare =

British soldier and peer (1851–1929)

The Right Honourable The Lord Aberdare VD DL JP
- Lord Aberdare in 1917

Member of the House of Lords
- Lord Temporal
- In office 25 February 1895 – 20 February 1929
- Preceded by: The 1st Baron Aberdare
- Succeeded by: The 3rd Baron Aberdare

Personal details
- Born: Henry Campbell Bruce; 19 June 1851 Merthyr Tydfil, Wales
- Died: 20 February 1929 (aged 77) St George Hanover Square, London, England
- Spouse: Constance Mary Beckett (m. 1880)
- Children: 9, including Clarence and Eva
- Parent: Henry Bruce, 1st Baron Aberdare (father)

Henry Campbell Bruce, 2nd Baron Aberdare (19 June 1851 – 20 February 1929), styled The Honourable from 1873 to 1895, was a British soldier and peer.

== Background ==
Born in Merthyr Tydfil, Bruce was the eldest son of Henry Bruce, 1st Baron Aberdare, who had served as Home Secretary. His mother Annabella was his father's first wife and the daughter of Richard Beadon. He was educated at Rugby School and at the Friedrich Wilhelm University in Berlin. In 1895, he succeeded his father as baron.

== Career ==
His military career, by virtue of his status in the nobility, was started early: he served in the Welch Regiment and became a major of the 3rd Battalion in 1899. A year later he was appointed its honorary lieutenant-colonel and in 1910 honorary colonel of the 5th Battalion. Later Bruce was promoted to lieutenant colonel of the 3rd Battalion. He was decorated with the Volunteer Decoration.

Bruce was president of University College as well as of the National Museum Wales. He was a Justice of the Peace, assigned to Glamorgan and represented the county first as Deputy Lieutenant from December 1901, later as Vice Lord Lieutenant.

He was a member of the London Survey Committee, a voluntary organisation publishing architectural surveys of the capital.

== Family ==
Coats of arms of the Barons Aberdare

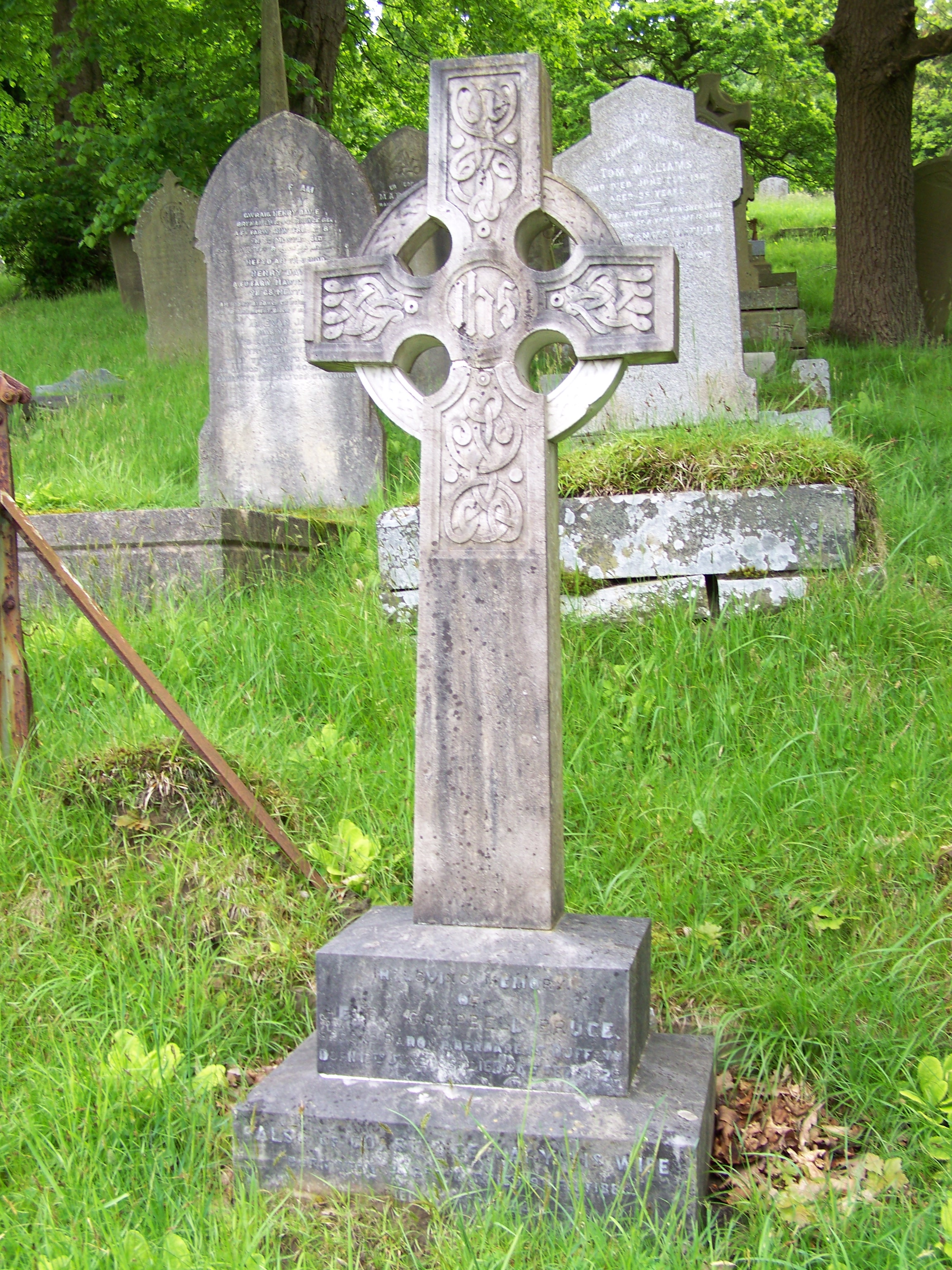
Henry Campbell Bruce's memorial at Aberffrwd cemetery in Mountain Ash, Wales

Bruce married Constance Mary, daughter of Hamilton Beckett on 10 February 1880. The couple had nine children together, five sons and four daughters.

- Capt. Hon. Henry Lyndhurst Bruce (25 May 1881 – 14 December 1914), married in 1906 Camille Clifford, a Belgian-born stage actress and the most famous model for the "Gibson Girl" illustrations; killed in action in Ypres with the Royal Scots in First World War
- Hon. Margaret Cecilia Bruce (28 October 1882 – 16 April 1949), married in 1904 Orlando Bridgeman, 5th Earl of Bradford
- Clarence Bruce, 3rd Baron Aberdare (2 August 1885 – 4 October 1957), married firstly in 1912 Margaret Bethune Black (died 1950), married secondly in 1957 Griselda Harriet Violet Finetta Georgina Hervey, only daughter of Dudley Hervey
- Hon. Violet Eva Bruce (8 November 1887 – 10 November 1887), died shortly after birth
- Hon. John Hamilton Bruce CBE (14 June 1889 – 8 April 1964)
- Hon. Eva Isabel Marion Bruce DBE JP (17 June 1892 – 29 January 1987), married in 1911 Algernon Strutt, 3rd Baron Belper (divorced 1922); married secondly in 1924 Harry Primrose, 6th Earl of Rosebery; created a Dame in 1955 and Chevalier of the Legion of Honour
- Hon. Constance Pamela Alice Bruce OBE JP (14 June 1895 – 15 March 1978), married in 1919 Edward Digby, 11th Baron Digby, mother of the socialite and US ambassador Pamela Harriman.
- Hon. Victor Austin Bruce (8 April 1897 – 1 December 1978), married in 1926 Mildred Mary Petre, known as Mrs Victor Bruce (10 November 1895 – 21 May 1990) record-breaking racing motorist, speedboat racer and aviator (divorced 1941).
- Hon. Robert Bruce (1 October 1898 – 22 October 1898), died shortly after birth

His oldest son and heir apparent Henry was commissioned a captain in the 3rd Battalion, Royal Scots, but was killed in action soon after the First World War broke out. Bruce died himself in St George Hanover Square, London, on 20 February 1929, and was succeeded in the barony by his second son Clarence.

== Notes ==
Peerage of the United Kingdom
Preceded by Henry Bruce	Baron Aberdare; 1895–1929; Member of the House of Lords (1895–1929)	Succeeded by Clarence Bruce
