= Mary Mumford, 15th Lady Herries of Terregles =

Scottish peeress

The Right Honourable The Lady Herries of Terregles DCVO
- Born: Lady Mary Katharine Fitzalan-Howard; 14 August 1940; Arundel Castle, Arundel, West Sussex, England
- Died: 7 April 2017 (aged 76)
- Spouse: Anthony Mumford (m. 1986; died 2006)
- Parents: Bernard Fitzalan-Howard, 16th Duke of Norfolk (father); The Hon. Lavinia Strutt (mother)
- Family: Fitzalan-Howard family

Mary Katharine Mumford, 15th Lady Herries of Terregles DCVO (née Fitzalan-Howard; 14 August 1940 – 7 April 2017) was a Scottish peeress and the second of the four daughters of the 16th Duke of Norfolk (and 13th Lord Herries of Terregles) and The Hon. Lavinia Strutt.

== Life ==
Born Lady Mary Fitzalan-Howard at Arundel Castle on 14 August 1940, she was the second of the four daughters of the 16th Duke of Norfolk and The Hon. Lavinia Strutt. She was a member of the ancient Fitzalan-Howard family, one of the most prominent noble families and most high-profile recusant families in England. Her elder sister, Anne, preceded her as 14th Lady Herries of Terregles; her younger two sisters were Lady Sarah Clutton and Jane, Marchioness of Lothian, who succeeded Mary as 16th Lady Herries of Terregles. She was educated at the Convent of the Sacred Heart, Woldingham, before attending finishing school in Neuilly-sur-Seine.

From 1964 until her death, she served as lady-in-waiting to Princess Alexandra. In recognition of her royal service and charity work, she was appointed a Member of the Fourth Class (MVO; now known as Lieutenant) of the Royal Victorian Order in the 1974 Birthday Honours, she was promoted to Commander (CVO) in the 1982 Birthday Honours and finally Dame Commander (DCVO) in the 1995 Birthday Honours.

From its foundation in 1967, she was patron of Rockinghorse, the Royal Alexandra Children's Hospital's official fundraising arm. Her other charity endeavours included canine rescue centres, hospitals and the Shoreham Harbour Lifeboat Station.

Lady Herries lived in a cottage in Arundel and on the Caerlaverock estate in Dumfries and Galloway. She and her sister operated a tearoom on the estate.

In 1986, in the chapel of Arundel Castle, she married Group Captain Anthony Mumford CVO OBE (died 2006). From her marriage until she inherited her sister's peerage in 2014, she was known as Lady Mary Mumford. In 2014, on the death of her elder sister, she inherited the ancient Scottish peerage the Lordship of Herries of Terregles, which her father had inherited from his mother, Gwendolen, Duchess of Norfolk (and 12th Lady Herries of Terregles).

Lady Herries died of pulmonary failure on 7 April 2017 at the age of 76.

Peerage of Scotland
Preceded by Anne Cowdrey	Lady Herries of Terregles; 2014–2017	Succeeded by Jane Kerr, Marchioness of Lothian
