= Herrys =

Herrys is a surname. Notable people with the surname include:

- Edward Herrys (1612–1662), MP for Maldon (1660)
- Christopher Herrys (1599–1628), MP for Harwich (1624–1628 not continuously)

== See also ==
- Herries
- Harris (surname)
