= Heil dir im Siegerkranz =

Prussian and German patriotic song

English: 'Hail to Thee in the Victor's Crown'
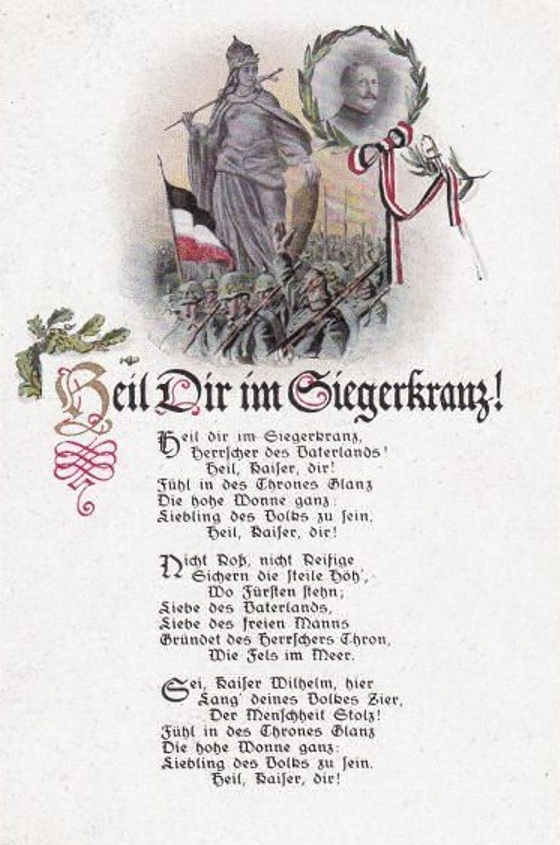
- Postcard c. 1900
- Former national anthem of the German Empire Former royal anthem of Prussia
- Lyrics: Heinrich Harries, 1790
- Music: "God Save the King"
- Adopted: 1795 (by Prussia); 1871 (by Germany)
- Relinquished: 1918
- Succeeded by: "Das Lied der Deutschen"

Audio sample
- Old vocal recording in A major: file; help

"Heil dir im Siegerkranz" (German: [ˈhaɪl diːɐ ɪm ˈziːɡɐˌkʁant͡s]; lit. 'Hail to Thee in the Victor's Crown') was the imperial anthem of the German Empire from 1871 to 1918, and previously the royal anthem of Prussia from 1795 to 1918.

Before the foundation of the Empire in 1871, it had been the royal anthem of Prussia since 1795 and remained as the royal anthem after 1871. The melody of the hymn derived from the British anthem "God Save the King". For these reasons, the song failed to become popular within all of Germany. Not only did it fail to win the support of most German nationalists, but it also was never recognized by the southern German states, such as Bavaria or Württemberg. At the near end of World War I, the German Empire was overthrown and "Das Lied der Deutschen" was adopted as the national anthem of its successor, the Weimar Republic.

It is often considered the official national anthem of the German Empire. However the German Empire never had an official anthem like the Weimar Republic or the Federal Republic of Germany (Lied der Deutschen). Together with "Die Wacht am Rhein" both songs had the status of unofficial national anthems.

== Lyrics ==
Heinrich Harries wrote the lyrics in 1790 in honour of King Christian VII of Denmark, and the line "Heil, Kaiser, dir" originally read "Heil, Christian, dir". In 1793, Harries' text was adapted by Balthasar Gerhard Schumacher (1755–1805) for use in Prussia. Schumacher shortened Harries' text and replaced the word Christian with König (king). After the proclamation of the German Empire, the word König was replaced by Kaiser (emperor).

German original

Heil dir im Siegerkranz,
Herrscher des Vaterlands!
Heil, Kaiser, dir!
𝄆 Fühl in des Thrones Glanz
Die hohe Wonne ganz,
Liebling des Volks zu sein!
Heil Kaiser, dir! 𝄇

Nicht Roß, nicht Reisige (Note: Alternatively sung as Nicht Roß, und Reisige.) (Note: In the original lyrics, the word "Roß" is spelled with an eszett. After the 1996 German orthography reform, the modern spelling is "Ross".)
Sichern die steile Höh’,
Wo Fürsten stehn:
𝄆 Liebe des Vaterlands,
Liebe des freien Manns
Gründen den Herrschers Thron
Wie Fels im Meer. 𝄇

Heilige Flamme, glüh',
Glüh' und erlösche nie
Für's Vaterland!
𝄆 Wir alle stehen dann
Mutig für einen Mann,
Kämpfen und bluten gern
Für Thron und Reich! 𝄇

Handlung und Wissenschaft
Hebe mit Mut und Kraft
Ihr Haupt empor!
𝄆 Krieger und Heldenthat
Finde ihr Lorbeerblatt
Treu aufgehoben dort,
An deinem Thron! 𝄇

Sei, Kaiser Wilhelm, hier
Lang deines Volkes Zier,
Der Menschheit Stolz!
𝄆 Fühl in des Thrones Glanz,
Die hohe Wonne ganz,
Liebling des Volks zu sein!
Heil, Kaiser, dir! 𝄇

IPA transcription

[haɪl diːɐ ˀɪm ˈziː.ɡɐ.ˌkʁant͡s |]
[ˈhɛɐ.ʃɐ deːs ˈfa.tɐ.ˌlant͡s |]
[haɪl ˈkaɪ.zɐ diːɐ ‖]
𝄆 [fyːl ˀɪn deːs ˈtʁoː.nəs glant͡s |]
[diː ˈhoː.ə ˈvɔ.nə gant͡s |]
[ˈliː.blɪŋ deːs ˈfɔlks t͡suː zaɪn |]
[haɪl ˈkaɪ.zɐ diːɐ ‖] 𝄇

[nɪçt ˈʁoːs nɪçt ˈʁaɪ.zɪ.gə |]
[ˈzɪ.çɐn diː ˈʃtaɪ.lə høː |]
[voː ˈfʏɐ.st(ə)n ˈʃteː(ə)n ‖]
𝄆 [ˈliː.bə deːs ˈfa.tɐ.ˌlant͡s |]
[ˈliː.bə deːs ˈfʁaɪ.ən mans |]
[ˈɡʁʏn.d(ə)n deːn ˈhɛɐ.ʃɐs tʁoːn |]
[viː ˈfɛls ˀɪm ˈmeːɐ ‖] 𝄇

[ˈhaɪ.lɪ.gə ˈfla.mə glyː |]
[glyː ˀʊnt ˀɛɐ.ˈlœ.ʃə niː |]
[fyːɐs ˈfa.tɐ.ˌlant ‖]
𝄆 [viːɐ ˈˀa.lə ˈʃteː(ə)n dan |]
[ˈmuː.tɪç fyːɐ ˈˀaɪ.nən man |]
[ˈkɛm.p͡f(ə)n ˀʊnt ˈbluː.t(ə)n ɡɛɐn |]
[fyːɐ ˈtʁoːn ˀʊnt ˈʁaɪç ‖] 𝄇

[ˈhand.lʊŋ ˀʊnt ˈvɪ.s(ə)n.ˌʃaft |]
[ˈheː.bə mɪt ˈmuːt ˀʊnt ˈkʁaft |]
[ˀiːɐ ˈhaʊpt ˀɛm.ˈpɔɐ ‖]
[ˈkʁiː.gɐ ˀʊnt ˈhɛl.d(ə)n.ˌtaːt |]
[ˈfɪn.də ˀiːɐ ˈloːɐ.beːɐ.ˌblat |]
[tʁɔʏ ˈˀaʊf.gə.ˌhoː.b(ə)n dɔɐt |]
[ˀan ˈdaɪ.nəm tʁoːn ‖] 𝄇

[zaɪ ˈkaɪ.zɐ ˈvɪl.ˌhɛlm hiːɐ |]
[laŋ ˈdaɪ.nəs ˈfɔl.kəs t͡siːɐ |]
[deːɐ ˈmɛnʃ.ˌhaɪt ʃtɔlt͡s ‖]
𝄆 [ˈfyːl ˀɪn deːs ˈtʁoː.nəs glant͡s |]
[diː ˈhoː.ə ˈvɔ.nə gant͡s |]
[ˈliː.blɪŋ deːs ˈfɔlks t͡suː zaɪn |]
[haɪl ˈkaɪ.zɐ diːɐ ‖] 𝄇

English translation

Hail to thee in victor's crown,
Ruler of the Fatherland!
Hail, kaiser, thee!
𝄆 Feel in the throne’s splendour
Feel in the sublime bliss
To be the folk's beloved!
Hail, kaiser, thee! 𝄇

Neither steed nor mounted knight
Secure the towering height,
Where princes stand:
𝄆 Love of the Fatherland,
Love of the free man,
Secure the ruler's throne
Like rocks at sea. 𝄇

O sacred flame, glow,
Glow and extinguish not,
For the Fatherland!
𝄆 Then we shall all stand
Valiant for one man,
Fighting and bleeding gladly
For Throne and Empire! 𝄇

Commerce and science
Hoist with courage and strength
Their heads aloft!
𝄆 Warriors' and heroes' deeds
Find their laurel leaves
Faithfully preserved
Upon thy throne! 𝄇

Be, Kaisier Wilhelm, here,
Long thy people's treasure,
Pride of mankind!
𝄆 Feel in the throne's splendour
Feel in the sublime bliss
To be the people’s beloved!
Hail, kaiser, thee! 𝄇

Kaiser Wilhelm in the lyrics originally referred to William I who reigned until 1888. His son, Frederick III, who reigned for only 99 days, was succeeded by Wilhelm II. One of the jokes at the time was that the song's title is changed to "Heil Dir im Sonderzug" ("Hail to Thee in Thy Royal Train"), owing to Wilhelm II's frequent travels. After the beginning of World War I in 1914, Hugo Kaun set the text of the anthem to new music to remove the similarity to "God Save the King".

== Other hymns ==
"Die Wacht am Rhein" ("The Watch on the Rhine") was also a patriotic hymn so popular that it was often regarded as an unofficial national anthem.

In the Kingdom of Bavaria, the official hymn was "Bayerische Königshymne" ("Heil unserm König, Heil!"), also sung to the melody of "God Save the King". Likewise, Liechtenstein has "Oben am jungen Rhein" (1920), sung to the same melody.

The Hawaiian anthem "Hawaiʻi Ponoʻī", composed by the Prussian Kapellmeister Henri Berger, is a variation of the melody.

== See also ==
- "My Country, 'Tis of Thee"

== Notes ==
No anthem before First German nation state	Imperial anthem of the German Empire; 1871–1918	Succeeded by "Deutschlandlied" as national anthem
