= 1892 New Year Honours =

Appointments by Queen Victoria to various orders and honours

The 1892 New Year Honours were appointments by Queen Victoria to various orders and honours of the United Kingdom and British India.

They were announced in The Times on 1 January 1892, and the various honours were gazetted in The London Gazette on 1 January 1892.

The recipients of honours are displayed or referred to as they were styled before their new honour and arranged by honour and where appropriate by rank (Knight Grand Cross, Knight Commander etc.) then division (Military, Civil).

== Peerage ==
- General Sir Frederick Sleigh Roberts, Bart., VC, GCB, GCIE
- Admiral Sir Arthur William Acland Hood, GCB
- Sir William Thomson, DCL, President of the Royal Society

== Privy Council ==
- Colonel Sir Walter Barttelot, Bart., CB, MP
- Arthur Bower Forwood, Esq., MP, Secretary to the Admiralty

== Baronet ==
- Lieutenant-Colonel Edward Law Durand, CB
- Thomas Dawson Brodie, Esq., of Idvies

== Knight Bachelor ==
- Colonel Edward Charles Ross, CSI, formerly British Resident and Consul-General for the Persian Gulf
- Principal William Duguid Geddes, LL.D.
- John Charles Samuel Grenier, Esq., Attorney-General of Ceylon
- Honourable William Hollingworth Quayle Jones, Chief Justice of Sierra Leone

== The Most Honourable Order of the Bath ==
=== Companions of the Order of the Bath ===
- Richard Powney Ebden, Esq.
- Joseph John Henley, Esq.
- George William Kekewich, Esq.
- Henry Austin Lee, Esq.
- Jacob Luard Pattisson, Esq.

== Order of the Star of India ==
=== Companions of the Order of the Star of India (CSI) ===
- John Woodburn, Bengal Civil Service.
- William Lee-Warner, Bombay Civil Service.

== Order of Saint Michael and Saint George ==
=== Knight Grand Cross of the Order of St Michael and St George (GCMG) ===
- Sir Cecil Clementi Smith, KCMG, Governor and Commander-in-Chief of the Straits Settlements, and Her Majesty's Consul-General and High Commissioner for North Borneo and Sarawak.

=== Knight Commander of the Order of St Michael and St George (KCMG) ===
- Commander Graham John Bower, CMG, late Royal Navy, Imperial Secretary and Accountant to the High Commissioner for South Africa.
- Francis Fleming, CMG, Colonial Secretary of Hong Kong.
- John Colton, formerly Premier of the Colony of South Australia.
- Henry John Wrixon, Member of the Executive Council and of the Legislative Assembly of the Colony of Victoria.

Honorary Knight Commander

- His Highness Idris bin Almarhom Bandhara Iskander Shah, CMG, Sultan of Perak.

=== Companion of the Order of St Michael and St George (CMG) ===
- Charles Vandeleur Creagh, Governor of the Colony of Labuan and of British North Borneo.
- Irwin Charles Maling, Administrator of the Island of Saint Vincent.
- Thomas Risely Griffith, Administrator of the Seychelles Islands.
- Captain Arthur William Moore, Royal Navy, for services rendered in connection with the defences of Australasia.
- Dudley Francis Amelius Hervey, Resident Councillor of Malacca, Straits Settlements.
- Henry Moore Jackson, Colonial Secretary of the Bahama Islands.
- Francis James Newton, Colonial Secretary and Receiver General of British Bechuanaland.
- John Fraser, Member of the Council of Government of the Colony of Mauritius.
- Edmond Gerald FitzGibbon, Town Clerk of the City of Melbourne, in the Colony of Victoria.
- Peter Daniel Anthonisz, MD, an unofficial member of the Legislative Council of the Island of Ceylon.

== Order of the Indian Empire ==
=== Knight Grand Commander of the Order of the Indian Empire (GCIE) ===
- His Highness Maharaj Adhiraj Sardul Singh Bahadur, Maharaja of Kishengarh.

=== Knight Commander of the Order of the Indian Empire (KCIE) ===
- His Excellency Ali Kuli Khan, Mukhbar-ud-Dowla of Persia, CIE.

=== Companion of the Order of the Indian Empire (CIE) ===
- Colonel John Charles Ardagh, CB, Royal Engineers.
- Frederick Clendon Daukes, Bengal Civil Service.
- Raja Ramachandra Vittal Rao Saheb, Raja of Sandur.
- Major Henry Percy Poingdestre Leigh, Indian Staff Corps.
- Raja Gajapati Rao, of Vizagapatam.
- Herbert Hope Risley, Bengal Civil Service.
- Muhammad Abdullah Khan, Khan Bahadur, of Isa Khel.
- Joseph Bampfylde Fuller, Bengal Civil Service.
- Mir Gholam Baba, Khan Bahadur, of Surat.
- Herbert Thirkell White, Bengal Civil Service.
