= Marmaduke Constable-Maxwell, 11th Lord Herries of Terregles =

Marmaduke Constable-Maxwell, 11th Lord Herries of Terregles, (4 October 1837 – 5 October 1908) was Lord Lieutenant of the East Riding of Yorkshire from 1880 and Lord-Lieutenant of Kirkcudbrightshire from 1885 until his death.

The son of William Constable-Maxwell, 10th Lord Herries of Terregles, who in 1858 was restored to the peerage attainted in 1716, he was educated at Stonyhurst College. Alongside the novelist Anthony Trollope he was an unsuccessful Liberal candidate for the two-member seat of Beverley in the 1868 United Kingdom general election. In 1875, he married the Hon. Angela Mary Charlotte Fitzalan-Howard, the 2nd daughter of the 1st Lord Howard of Glossop: they had two daughters.

- Gwendolen became the second wife of the 15th Duke of Norfolk.;
- Hon. Angela Mary Constable-Maxwell who married Eric Drummond, 7th Earl of Perth.

Lord Herries was appointed Honorary Colonel of the East Riding of Yorkshire Yeomanry on 14 February 1903.

Honorary titles
Preceded by The Lord Wenlock	Lord Lieutenant of the East Riding of Yorkshire; 1880–1908	Succeeded by The Lord Nunburnholme
Preceded by The Earl of Selkirk	Lord Lieutenant of Kirkcudbright; 1885–1908	Succeeded by Robert Francis Dudgeon
Peerage of the United Kingdom
New creation	Baron Herries; 1884–1908	Extinct
Peerage of Scotland
Preceded by William Constable-Maxwell	Lord Herries of Terregles; 1876–1908	Succeeded by Gwendolen Fitzalan-Howard
