= Bernard Fitzalan-Howard, 16th Duke of Norfolk =

British peer and politician (1908–1975)

His Grace The Duke of Norfolk KG GCVO GBE TD PC
- The Duke of Norfolk in 1929

Earl Marshal
- In office 11 February 1917 – 31 January 1975
- Monarchs: George V; Edward VIII; George VI; Elizabeth II
- Preceded by: The 15th Duke of Norfolk
- Succeeded by: The 17th Duke of Norfolk

Member of the House of Lords Lord Temporal
- In office 11 February 1917 – 31 January 1975; Hereditary Peerage
- Preceded by: The 15th Duke of Norfolk
- Succeeded by: The 17th Duke of Norfolk

Personal details
- Born: Bernard Marmaduke Fitzalan-Howard; 30 May 1908
- Died: 31 January 1975 (aged 66)
- Spouse: Lavinia Mary Strutt (m. 1937)
- Children: Anne Cowdrey, 14th Lady Herries of Terregles; Mary Mumford, 15th Lady Herries of Terregles; Lady Sarah Clutton; Jane Kerr, Marchioness of Lothian
- Parents: Henry Fitzalan-Howard (father); Gwendolen Constable-Maxwell (mother)
- Education: The Oratory School

Bernard Marmaduke Fitzalan-Howard, 16th Duke of Norfolk, 13th Lord Herries of Terregles KG GCVO GBE TD PC (30 May 1908 – 31 January 1975), styled Earl of Arundel and Surrey until 1917, was a British peer and politician. He was the second and only surviving son of Henry Fitzalan-Howard, 15th Duke of Norfolk, who died when Bernard was only nine years old. His mother was Gwendoline Herries, 12th Lady Herries of Terregles, and he inherited her peerage when she died in 1945.

He was educated at the Oratory School and was commissioned into the Royal Horse Guards in 1931, but resigned his commission in 1933. He joined the 4th Battalion, Royal Sussex Regiment, in the Territorial Army in 1934, and was promoted to major in 1939. He served briefly in the Battle of France, during which he was evacuated sick. He subsequently served as Agricultural Secretary in Winston Churchill's Cabinet from February 1941 until June 1945.

As hereditary Earl Marshal, he organised the coronation of King George VI and Queen Elizabeth, the coronation of Queen Elizabeth II, the funeral of Winston Churchill, and the investiture of King Charles III as Prince of Wales. He was a keen cricket fan, and was the manager of the English cricket team in Australia in 1962–63.

== Personal life ==
The Duke married the Hon Lavinia Mary Strutt, daughter of Algernon Strutt, 3rd Baron Belper, and his wife Eva, on 27 January 1937 at the Brompton Oratory. They had four daughters, three granddaughters and two great-grandchildren:

- Lady Anne Elizabeth Fitzalan-Howard, 14th Lady Herries of Terregles, Baroness Cowdrey of Tonbridge (12 June 1938 – 23 November 2014); she married Colin Cowdrey, Baron Cowdrey of Tonbridge, in 1985.
- Lady Mary Katharine Fitzalan-Howard, 15th Lady Herries of Terregles, DCVO (14 August 1940 – 7 April 2017); she married G/Capt. Anthony Mumford in 1986.
- Lady Sarah Margaret Fitzalan-Howard (23 September 1941 – 14 June 2015); she married Nigel Clutton on 25 March 1988
- Lady Theresa Jane Fitzalan-Howard, Marchioness of Lothian, 16th Lady Herries of Terregles (24 June 1945); she married Michael Andrew Foster Jude Kerr, 13th Marquess of Lothian, on 7 June 1975. They have three daughters and two grandchildren.

The 16th Duke died on 31 January 1975, and is buried in the Fitzalan Chapel in the western grounds of Arundel Castle in Sussex.

== Dukedom of Norfolk and Earl Marshal ==
As Duke of Norfolk, he was Earl Marshal and Hereditary Marshal of England. In that capacity, the Duke had helped to organise various state ceremonies such as the coronation of King George VI in 1937 and that of Queen Elizabeth II in 1953. He also helped to organise the state funerals of King George VI in 1952 and of Winston Churchill in 1965. In 1969, he also took part in the planning for the investiture of Prince Charles as the Prince of Wales.

On his death, the dukedom passed to his second cousin once removed Miles Stapleton-Fitzalan-Howard, 12th Baron Beaumont, 4th Baron Howard of Glossop. The Lordship of Herries of Terregles, being an old Scottish peerage, was inherited by his eldest daughter, Anne (14th Lady Herries of Terregles, Baroness Cowdrey of Tonbridge), who later married English cricketer Colin Cowdrey.

As a keen cricket fan himself, Howard formed his own team in early 1957 to visit Jamaica. They played three first-class matches against Jamaica, winning two and drawing the other, and also seven non-first-class matches. Howard had been President of Marylebone Cricket Club (MCC) in 1956–57, and was still a member of its committee in 1962. MCC invited him to manage the English team in Australia in 1962–63. Alec Bedser would be his assistant, so Howard accepted. However, due to the demands of his role as Earl Marshal, he had to return to Britain while the tour was in progress. While he was in Australia, Howard helped with preparations for the 1963 Royal Visit by the Queen. MCC Secretary Billy Griffith replaced him as tour manager. In February 1970, another of Howard's teams went to the West Indies, playing first-class matches against the Windward Islands, Trinidad and Tobago, and Barbados. They also played six non-first-class matches.

== Family tree ==
Family tree of the Dukes of Norfolk and Suke of Surrey; Earls of Arundel, East Anglia, Norfolk, Norwich, Nottingham, and Surrey; and Barons Mowbray, Segrave and Stourton

Earl of East Anglia (Earls of Norfolk and Suffolk) (1st creation), a. 1069
Ralph the Staller c. 1011–1068; 1st Earl of Norfolk and Suffolk, or of the East Angles (Earl c. 1066/67 – 1068)
Earl of Surrey (1st creation), c. 1088
Ralph de Gael a. 1040–1100; 2nd Earl of Norfolk and Suffolk, or of the East Angles (Earl 1068–1074)	Roger Bigod (Bigot) d. 1107; Sheriff of Norfolk and Suffolk	William de Warenne c. 1035–1088; 1st Earl (of) Warenne / Earl of Surrey, Lord of Lewes, Seigneur de Varennes
Earldom forfeit, 1074
Earl of Norfolk (2nd creation), 1141
King Henry I c. 1068–1135	Maud Bigod	William Bigod d. 1120	Hugh Bigod; 1095–1177; 1st Earl of Norfolk (Earl 1141–1177)	William de Warenne d. 1138; 2nd Earl (of) Warenne / Earl of Surrey
Earl of Arundel, Earl of Sussex (1st creations), c. 1138
Empress Matilda c. 1102–1167	Geoffrey Plantagenet; 1113–1251; Count of Anjou	Adeliza of Louvain c. 1103–1151	William d'Aubigny c. 1109–1176; 1st Earl of Arundel (Sussex), Earl of Lincoln	William de Warenne; 1119–1148; 3rd Earl of Surrey
King Henry II; 1133–1189	William d'Aubigny b. c. 1138/1150–1176; 2nd Earl of Arundel (Sussex)	Roger Bigod c. 1144/1150–1221; 2nd Earl of Norfolk (Earl 1189–1221, disputed 1177–1189)	William of Blois c. 1137–1159	Isabel de Warenne c. 1130 – 1203; 4th Countess of Surrey suo jure	Hamelin de Warenne c. 1130–1202; Comte de Warenne / Earl of Surrey, jure uxoris
King John; 1166/1167–1216	William d'Aubigny a. 1180–1221; 3rd Earl of Arundel (Sussex)	Hugh Bigod; 1186–1225; 3rd Earl of Norfolk (Earl 1221–1225)	Maud Marshal; 1192–1248	William de Warenne c. 1160s/1170s–1240 5th Earl of Surrey
William d'Aubigny c. 1203–a. 1124; 4th Earl of Arundel (Sussex)	Hugh d'Aubigny d. 1243; 5th Earl of Arundel (Sussex)	Isabel d'Aubigny	John Fitzalan; 1200–1240; Lord of Clun and Oswestry	Roger Bigod c. 1209–1270; 4th Earl of Norfolk (Earl 1233–1270)	Hugh Bigod c. 1211–1266
Earl of Sussex (1st creation), 1282
King Henry III; 1207–1272	John Fitzalan; 1223–1267; 6th Earl of Arundel (Sussex), jure matris	John de Warenne; 1231–1304; 1st Earl of Sussex (Earl of Sussex 1282–1304), 6th Earl of Surrey (Earl of Surrey 1240–1304)
Baron Segrave of Se(a)grave, 1283
Nicholas Segrave c. 1238–a. 1295; 1st Baron Segrave	King Edward I 1239–1307	Edmund Crouchback; 1245–1296; Earl of Lancaster	John Fitzalan; 1246–1272; 7th Earl of Arundel (Sussex), jure matris	Roger Bigod c. 1245–1306; 5th Earl of Norfolk (Earl 1270–1306)
Earldom extinct, 1270
Baron Mowbray, 1283	Earl of Arundel (2nd (1st by writ) creation), 1289
John Segrave c. 1256–1325; 2nd Baron Segrave	Roger de Mowbray; 1254–1297; 1st Baron Mowbray	Richard Fitzalan; 1267–1302; 1st (or 6th) Earl of Arundel	William de Warenne; 1256–1286
Earl of Norfolk (3rd creation), 1312
Stephen Segrave d. 1325; 3rd Baron Segrave	Thomas of Brotherton; 1300–1338; 1st Earl of Norfolk (Earl 1312–1338)	John Mowbray; 1286–1322; 2nd Baron Mowbray	Henry c. 1281–1345; Earl of Leicester, Earl of Lancaster	Edmund Fitzalan; 1286–1326; 2nd (or 7th) Earl of Arundel	Alice de Warenne; 1287–1388 heir apparent to the Earldom of Surrey	John de Warenne; 1286–1347; 7th Earl of Surrey, 2nd Earl of Sussex
Earldom of Arundel (2nd creation) forfeit, 1326	Earldom of Sussex extinct(?), 1347
Earldom of Arundel (2nd creation) restored, 1331
John Segrave; 1315–1353; 4th Baron Segrave	Margaret of Brotherton; 1320–1399; Duchess of Norfolk "for life" (Duchess 1397–1399), 2nd Countess of Norfolk (Countess 1338–1399),	John Mowbray; 1310–1361; 3rd Baron Mowbray	Joan of Lancaster c. 1312–1349	Eleanor of Lancaster; 1318–1372	Richard FitzAlan c. 1313–1376; 3rd (or 8th) Earl of Arundel (Earl of Arundel 1331–1376), 8th Earl of Surrey (Earl of Surrey 1347–1376)
Baron Arundel, 1377
Elizabeth de Segrave; 1338–1368; 5th Baroness Segrave	John de Mowbray; 1340–1368; 4th Baron Mowbray	Richard FitzAlan; 1346–1397; 4th (or 9th) Earl of Arundel, 9th Earl of Surrey	John FitzAlan c. 1348–1379; 1st Baron Arundel	Alice FitzAlan
Earldom of Arundel (2nd creation) forfeit, 1397
Earl of Nottingham (1st creation), 1377	Earl of Nottingham (2nd creation), 1383; Duke of Norfolk (1st creation), 1397	Duke of Surrey, 1397
John de Mowbray; 1365–1383; Earl of Nottingham (Earl 1377–1383), 6th Baron Segrave, 5th Baron Mowbray (Baron 1368–1383)	Thomas de Mowbray; 1366–1399; 1st Duke of Norfolk, etc. (Duke 1397–1399), 3rd Earl of Norfolk (Earl 1399), 7th Baron Segrave, 6th Baron Mowbray (Baron 1377–1399)	Elizabeth Fitzalan; 1366–1425	John FitzAlan; 1364–1390; 2nd Baron Arundel	Thomas Holland; 1372–1400; Duke of Surrey, Earl of Kent, Baron Holland
Earldom of Nottingham extinct, 1383	Titles forfeit, 1399	Dukedom of Surrey renounced, 1400
Baron Stourton, 1448	Duke of Norfolk (1st creation restored), 1425	Earldom of Arundel (2nd creation) restored, 1400
John Stourton; 1400–1462; 1st Baron Stourton (Baron 1448–1462)	Thomas de Mowbray; 1385–1405; 4th Earl of Norfolk, 8th Baron Segrave, 7th Baron Mowbray (Earl 1399–1405)	John de Mowbray; 1392–1432; 2nd Duke of Norfolk (Duke 1425–1432), 5th Earl of Norfolk, 9th Baron Segrave, 8th Baron Mowbray (Earl 1405–1432)	Margaret de Mowbray c. 1388–1459	Robert Howard; 1385–1436	Isabel de Mowbray c. 1400–1452	Thomas FitzAlan; 1381–1415; 5th (or 10th) Earl of Arundel, 10th Earl of Surrey	John Fitzalan; 1385–1421; 6th (or 11th) Earl of Arundel, 3rd Baron Arundel, 3rd Baron Maltravers
Duke of Norfolk (4th creation), 1483
William Stourton a. 1426–1478; 2nd Baron Stourton (Baron 1462–1478)	John de Mowbray; 1415–1461; 3rd Duke of Norfolk, 6th Earl of Norfolk, 10th Baron Segrave, 9th Baron Mowbray (Duke 1432–1461)	John Howard; 1425–1485; 1st Duke of Norfolk, 13th Baron Segrave, 12th Baron Mowbray (Duke 1483–1485)	John Fitzalan; 1408–1435; 7th (or 12th) Earl of Arundel, 4th Baron Arundel, 4th Baron Maltravers	William Fitzalan; 1417–1487; 9th (or 14th) Earl of Arundel, 6th Baron Arundel, 6th Baron Maltravers
Titles forfeit, 1485
Earl of Surrey (2nd creation), 1451	Duke of Norfolk (4th creation) restored and Earl of Surrey, 1514
John Stourton c. 1454–1485; 3rd Baron Stourton (Baron 1479–1485)	William Stourton c. 1457–1524; 5th Baron Stourton (Baron 1487–1524)	John de Mowbray; 1444–1476; 4th Duke of Norfolk, 7th Earl of Norfolk, 11th Baron Segrave, 10th Baron Mowbray (Duke 1461–1476), Earl of Surrey (Earl 1451–1476)	King Edward IV; 1442–1483	Thomas Howard; 1443–1524; 2nd Duke of Norfolk, 1st Earl of Surrey (Duke 1514–1524)	Humfrey Fitzalan; 1429–1438; 8th (or 13th) Earl of Arundel, 5th Baron Arundel, 5th Baron Maltravers	Thomas Fitzalan; 1450–1524; 10th (or 15th) Earl of Arundel, 7th Baron Arundel, 7th Baron Maltravers
Dukedom of Norfolk, Earldom of Nottingham, Earldom of Surrey extinct, 1476
Duke of Norfolk (3rd creation), Earl of Nottingham (3rd creation), and Earl of Surrey, 1477
Francis Stourton; 1485–1487; 4th Baron Stourton (Baron 1485–1487)	Edward Stourton; 1463–1535; 6th Baron Stourton (Baron 1524–1535)	Anne de Mowbray; 1472–1481; 8th Countess of Norfolk, 12th Baroness Segrave, 11th Baroness Mowbray (Countess 1476–1481)	Richard of Shrewsbury; 1473–1483; Duke of York, Duke of Norfolk, Earl of Nottingham, Earl of Warenne (Duke 1477–1483)	Anne of York; 1475–1511	Thomas Howard; 1473–1554; 3rd Duke of Norfolk, 2nd Earl of Surrey (Duke 1524–1554)	Edmund Howard c. 1478–1539	Elizabeth Boleyn c. 1480–1538	William Fitzalan; 1476–1544; 11th (or 16th) Earl of Arundel, 8th Baron Arundel, 8th Baron Maltravers
Earldom of Norfolk extinct and Baronies Segrave and Mowbray in abeyance, 1481	Dukedom of Norfolk, Earldom of Nottingham, Earldom of Surrey extinct, 1483	Attainted, 1547; Restored, 1553
William Stourton c. 1505–1548; 7th Baron Stourton	Earl of Nottingham (5th creation), 1525	King Henry VIII; 1491–1547	Anne Boleyn c. 1501 or 1507–1536
Viscount Howard of Bindon, 1559
Charles Stourton c. 1520–1557; 8th Baron Stourton	Henry Howard; 1517–1547 styled Earl of Surrey	Thomas Howard c. 1520–1582; 1st Viscount Howard of Bindon	Mary FitzRoy; 1519–1557	Henry FitzRoy; 1519–1536; Duke of Richmond and Somerset, Earl of Nottingham	Catherine Howard c. 1524–1542	Henry Fitzalan; 1512–1580; 12th (or 17th) Earl of Arundel, 9th Baron Arundel, 9th Baron Maltravers
Earldom of Nottingham extinct, 1536
Thomas Howard; 1536–1572; 4th Duke of Norfolk, 3rd Earl of Surrey, 13th Baron Mowbray (Duke 1554–1572)	Henry Howard; 1540–1614; Earl of Northampton	Queen Elizabeth I 1533–1603	Mary FitzAlan; 1540–1557
Dukedom (3rd creation) forfeit, 1572
Earl of Arundel (3rd creation), 1580	Earl of Suffolk (4th creation), 1603
John Stourton; 1553–1588; 9th Baron Stourton	Edward Stourton c. 1555–1633; 10th Baron Stourton	Philip Howard; 1557–1595; 20th/13th/1st Earl of Arundel, styled Earl of Surrey	Thomas Howard; 1561–1626; Earl of Suffolk	Lord William Howard; 1563–1640
Earldom of Arundel and Barony of Mowbray attainted, 1589	see Earls, Marquesses, and Dukes of Suffolk family tree
Earl of Arundel (3rd creation) and Barony of Mowbray restored, 1604; Earl of Norfolk (5th creation), 1644
William Stourton c. 1594–1672; 11th Baron Stourton	Thomas Howard; 1585–1646; 21st/14th/2nd Earl of Arundel, 2nd/4th Earl of Surrey, 1st Earl of Norfolk, 14th Baron Mowbray (Earl 1644–1646)	Philip
see Earls of Shrewsbury family tree
Edward Stourton; 1617–1644	Alethea Talbot; 1585–1654; 17th Baroness Strange of Blackmere, 14th Baroness Talbot, 13th Baroness Furnivall	Henry Frederick Howard; 1608–1652; 22nd/15th/3rd Earl of Arundel, 3rd/5th Earl of Surrey, 2nd Earl of Norfolk, 15th Baron Mowbray (Earl 1646–1652)	William Howard; 1614–1680; Viscount Stafford	William
Duke of Norfolk (4th creation restored), 1660	Baron Howard of Castle Rising, 1669; Earl of Norwich (3rd creation), 1672
William Stourton d. 1685; 12th Baron Stourton	Thomas Howard; 1627–1677; 5th Duke of Norfolk, 21st/14th/2nd Earl of Arundel, 4th/6th Earl of Surrey, 16th Baron Mowbray (Duke 1660–1677) 18th Baron Strange of Blackmere, 15th Baron Talbot, 14th Baron Furnivall (Baron 1654–1677)	Henry Howard; 1628–1684; 6th Duke of Norfolk, 22nd/15th/3rd Earl of Arundel, 5th/7th Earl of Surrey; 18th Baron Strange of Blackmere, 17th Baron Mowbray, 15th Baron Talbot, 14th Baron Furnivall (Duke 1677–1684) 1st Earl of Norwich, etc. (Earl 1672–1684)	Charles Howard; 1630–1713	Col. Bernard Howard; 1641–1717	Charles Howard; 1628–1685; Earl of Carlisle
Edward Stourton; 1665–1720; 13th Baron Stourton	Thomas Stourton; 1667–1744; 14th Baron Stourton	Charles Stourton; 1669–1739	Henry Howard; 1655–1701; 7th Duke of Norfolk, 22nd/15th/3rd Earl of Arundel, 5th/7th Earl of Surrey, 2nd Earl of Norwich, etc. 18th Baron Mowbray, 19th Baron Strange of Blackmere, 15th Baron Talbot, 14th Baron Furnivall (Duke 1684–1701)	Lord Thomas Howard; 1662–1689	Henry Charles Howard d. 1720
Thomas Howard; 1683–1732; 8th Duke of Norfolk, 23rd/16th/4th Earl of Arundel, 6th/8th Earl of Surrey, 3rd Earl of Norwich, etc. 18th Baron Strange of Blackmere, 15th Baron Talbot, 14th Baron Furnivall, 19th Baron Mowbray (Duke 1701–1732)	Edward Howard; 1685–1777; 9th Duke of Norfolk, 24th/17th/5th Earl of Arundel, 7th/9th Earl of Surrey, 4th Earl of Norwich, etc. 20th Baron Mowbray, 20th Baron Strange of Blackmere, 15th Baron Talbot, 14th Baron Furnivall (Duke 1732–1777)	Philip Howard; 1688–1750	Bernard Howard; 1674–1735
Earldom of Norwich (3rd creation) and Barony of Howard of Castle Rising extinct and Baronies of Furnivall, Mowbray, Segrave, Strange of Blackmere, and Talbot abeyant, 1777
Charles Stourton; 1702–1753; 15th Baron Stourton	William Stourton; 1704–1781; 16th Baron Stourton	Winifred Howard; 1726–1753	Anne Howard; 1742–1787	Charles Howard; 1720–1786; 10th Duke of Norfolk, 25th/18th/6th Earl of Arundel, 8th/10th Earl of Surrey (Duke 1777–1786)	Henry Howard; 1713–1787
Charles Philip Stourton; 1752–1816; 17th Baron Stourton	Charles Howard; 1746–1815; 11th Duke of Norfolk, 26th/19th/7th Earl of Arundel, 9th/11th Earl of Surrey (Duke 1786–1815)
William Stourton; 1776–1846; 18th Baron Stourton	Bernard Howard; 1765–1842; 12th Duke of Norfolk, 27th/20th/8th Earl of Arundel, 10th/12th Earl of Surrey (Duke 1815–1842)	Henry Howard-Molyneux-Howard; 1766–1824
Charles Stourton; 1802–1872; 19th Baron Stourton	Henry Howard; 1791–1856; 13th Duke of Norfolk, 28th/21st/9th Earl of Arundel, 11th/13th Earl of Surrey (Duke 1842–1856)	Henry Howard-Molyneux-Howard; 1802–1875
Baron Mowbray and Baron Segrave abeayance restored, 1878	Baron Howard of Glossop, 1869
Alfred Joseph Stourton; 1829–1893; 24th Baron Segrave, 21st/23rd Baron Mowbray, 20th Baron Stourton	Henry Granville Fitzalan-Howard; 1815–1860; 14th Duke of Norfolk, 29th/22nd/10th Earl of Arundel, 12th/14th Earl of Surrey (Duke 1856–1860)	Edward George Fitzalan-Howard; 1818–1883; 1st Baron Howard of Glossop
Baron Howard of Penrith, 1830
Charles Botolph Joseph Stourton; 1867–1936; 25th Baron Segrave, 22nd/24th Baron Mowbray, 21st Baron Stourton	Henry Fitzalan-Howard; 1847–1917; 15th Duke of Norfolk, 30th/23rd/11th Earl of Arundel, 13th/15th Earl of Surrey, Lord Maltravers, Earl of Arundel and Surrey (Duke 1860–1917)	Francis Fitzalan-Howard; 1859–1924; 2nd Baron Howard of Glossop	Esmé Howard; 1863–1939; 1st Baron Howard of Penrith
William Marmaduke Stourton; 1895–1965; 26th Baron Segrave, 23rd/25th Baron Mowbray, 22nd Baron Stourton	Bernard Fitzalan-Howard; 1908–1975; 16th Duke of Norfolk, 31st/24th/12th Earl of Arundel, 14th/16th Earl of Surrey (Duke 1917–1975)	Bernard Edward Fitzalan-Howard; 1885–1972; 3rd Baron Howard of Glossop	Francis Howard; 1905–1999; 2nd Baron Howard of Penrith
Charles Edward Stourton; 1923–2006; 27th Baron Segrave, 24th/26th Baron Mowbray, 23rd Baron Stourton	Miles Fitzalan-Howard; 1915–2002; 17th Duke of Norfolk, 32nd/25th/13th Earl of Arundel, 15th/17th Earl of Surrey, 4th Baron Howard of Glossop (Duke 1975–2002) m. Mary Teresa Constable-Maxwell
Edward William Stephen Stourton; 1953–2021; 28th Baron Segrave, 25th/27th Baron Mowbray, 24th Baron Stourton	Marsha Howard b. 1953	Edward Fitzalan-Howard b. 1956; 18th Duke of Norfolk, 33rd/26th/14th Earl of Arundel, 16th/18th Earl of Surrey, 5th Baron Howard of Glossop (from 2002) m. Georgina Susan Gore	Philip Esmé Howard b. 1945; 3rd Baron Howard of Penrith
Sarah Louise Stourton b. 1982	Isabella Laura Stourton b. 1983	Camilla Charlotte Stourton b. 1987	Francesca Jane Stourton b. 1988	James Charles Peter Stourton b. 1991; 29th Baron Segrave, 26th/28th Baron Mowbray, 25th Baron Stourton	Henry Fitzalan-Howard b. 1987 styled Earl of Arundel and Surrey	Thomas Philip Howard b. 1974
Co-heir presumptive to the Baronies Segrave, Mowbray, and Stourton	Co-heir presumptive to the Baronies Segrave, Mowbray, and Stourton	Co-heir presumptive to the Baronies Segrave, Mowbray, and Stourton	Co-heir presumptive to the Baronies Segrave, Mowbray, and Stourton	Heir apparent to the dukedom	Heir apparent to the Barony Howard of Penrith

== Titles and honours ==
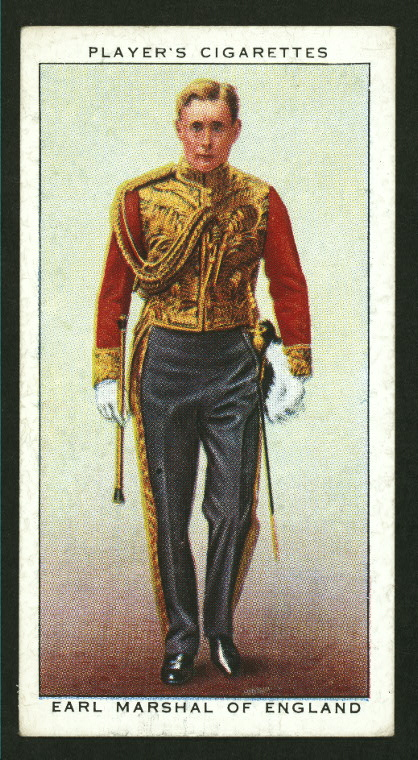
Player's cigarette card featuring the Earl Marshal in coronation dress.

=== Titles ===
- Earl of Arundel (1908–1917)
- His Grace The Duke of Norfolk (1917–1975)

=== Honours ===
- Knight Companion of the Most Noble Order of the Garter (1937)
- Knight Grand Cross of the Royal Victorian Order (1946)
- Royal Victorian Chain (1953)
- Knight Grand Cross of the Order of the British Empire (1968)
- Territorial Decoration (1969)
- Privy Council of the United Kingdom (1936)
- Lord Lieutenant of Sussex (1949–1974)
- Deputy Lieutenant of Sussex (1945)
- Lord Lieutenant of West Sussex (1974–1975)

== See also ==
- Re Duke of Norfolk's Settlement Trusts [1982] Ch 61, a case concerning the payment of the trustees of the 16th Duke's family trust

== Bibliography ==
- Swanton, E. W. (1977). Swanton in Australia with MCC: 1946–1975. Glasgow: Fontana/Collins. ISBN 978-00-06345-16-9.

Political offices
Preceded by The Lord Moyne; Tom Williams	Parliamentary Secretary to the Ministry of Agriculture and Fisheries jointly with Tom Williams 1941–1945; Donald Scott 1945; 1941–1945	Succeeded by The Earl of Huntingdon; Percy Collick
Preceded by The 15th Duke of Norfolk	Earl Marshal; 1917–1975	Succeeded by The 17th Duke of Norfolk
Court offices
Preceded by The Lord Hamilton of Dalzell	Her Majesty's Representative at Ascot; 1945–1972	Succeeded by The Marquess of Abergavenny
Honorary titles
Preceded by The Lord Leconfield	Lord Lieutenant of Sussex; 1949–1974	Office abolished
New creation	Lord Lieutenant of West Sussex; 1974–1975	Succeeded by The Duchess of Norfolk
Peerage of England
Preceded by Henry Fitzalan-Howard	Duke of Norfolk; 1917–1975	Succeeded by Miles Fitzalan-Howard
Peerage of Scotland
Preceded by Gwendolen Fitzalan-Howard	Lord Herries of Terregles; 1945–1975	Succeeded by Anne Cowdrey
