= Duke of Norfolk's XI =

The Duke of Norfolk's XI is a scratch cricket team. It was originally named for the 16th Duke, but following his death in 1975 the team played on in his widow's name as Lavinia, Duchess of Norfolk's XI. After her own death in 1995, the title reverted to the original, in the name of the 17th (until 2002) and then 18th Dukes.

From 1952 to 1998 the English international summer was traditionally marked by a one-day fixture between this team and the tourists at Arundel Castle Cricket Ground, the castle being the seat of the Dukes of Norfolk. The team has played almost all its matches in England at that ground, although one match against the International Cavaliers in 1966 was played at Hove. The team has typically been made up largely of county players not involved in other games, mixed with recently retired internationals. Derek Randall, Robin Smith and Andy Flower are among those to have played for the Duke's team.

The Duke of Norfolk's XI made two first-class tours overseas. In February and March 1957, managed by the Duke and captained by Desmond Eagar, they played three first-class matches against Jamaica; the touring team won two and the other match was drawn. The other first-class tour was also to the Caribbean, in 1969–70, when the Duke managed a team captained by Colin Cowdrey which played three first-class and one List A games against the island teams, with one win, two losses and one draw.
