= Ronald Strutt, 4th Baron Belper =

British peer and, soldier and equestrian (1912–1999)

Major The Right Honourable The Lord Belper

Member of the House of Lords
- In office 20 May 1956 – 11 November 1999

Personal details
- Born: Alexander Ronald George Strutt; 28 April 1912
- Died: 23 December 1999 (aged 87)
- Spouse: Zara Sophie Kathleen Mary Mainwaring (m. 1940; div. 1949)
- Parents: Algernon Strutt, 3rd Baron Belper (father); Eva Isabel Mary Bruce (mother)
- Relatives: Richard Henry Strutt (son)

Military service
- Allegiance: United Kingdom
- Branch/service: British Army
- Years of service: 1932–1944
- Rank: Major
- Unit: Coldstream Guards
- Battles/wars: Second World War

Alexander Ronald George Strutt, 4th Baron Belper (28 April 1912 – 23 December 1999), was a British hereditary peer, British Army officer, and equestrian.

== Early life and education ==
On 28 April 1912, Strutt was born to Algernon Strutt, 3rd Baron Belper, and his wife Eva Isabel Mary Bruce. He was educated at Harrow School, an all-boys public school in London. He underwent officer training at the Royal Military College, Sandhurst.

== Career ==
=== Military service ===
Having completed his officer training, Strutt was commissioned into the Coldstream Guards on 1 September 1932 as a second lieutenant. He was promoted to lieutenant on 1 September 1935, to captain on 1 September 1940, and to major on 1 July 1946.

Strutt saw active service during the Second World War, and was wounded on active duty in 1944.

=== Equestrian career ===
He rode Crown Prince (owned by his stepfather, Lord Rosebery) to victory in the National Hunt Chase Challenge Cup at Cheltenham in 1934. He was, for some time, racing manager for Stavros Niarchos. As an owner his best horse was Cesarewitch Handicap victor Persian Lancer. It won in 1966, ridden by Doug Smith. He was Master of the Quorn Hunt from 1948 to 1954.

== Family ==
On 15 November 1940, Strutt married Zara Sophie Kathleen Mary Mainwaring. She was the daughter of Sir Harry Mainwaring, 5th Baronet, and Generis Williams-Bulkeley. There was one child from this marriage:

- Richard Henry Strutt, 5th Baron Belper (b. 24 October 1941).

He and Zara Sophie Kathleen Mary Mainwaring were divorced in 1949. She later married Peter Cazalet, trainer of horses for Queen Elizabeth The Queen Mother.

Belper lost the sight in one eye in 1957, after being hit by a stray shot from millionaire racehorse trainer Bernard Van Cutsem.

In March 2000 it was revealed that Belper was the "Lord Y" in Janie Jones' trial for allegedly running a call-girl ring. Belper had been a regular client of Jones', and upon his name being discovered in her client book, claimed that Jones had been blackmailing him. Jones was subsequently acquitted of sexual blackmail.

Peerage of the United Kingdom
Preceded by Algernon Henry Strutt	Baron Belper; 1956–1999	Succeeded by Richard Henry Strutt
