= William Constable-Maxwell, 10th Lord Herries of Terregles =

Scottish peer and landowner

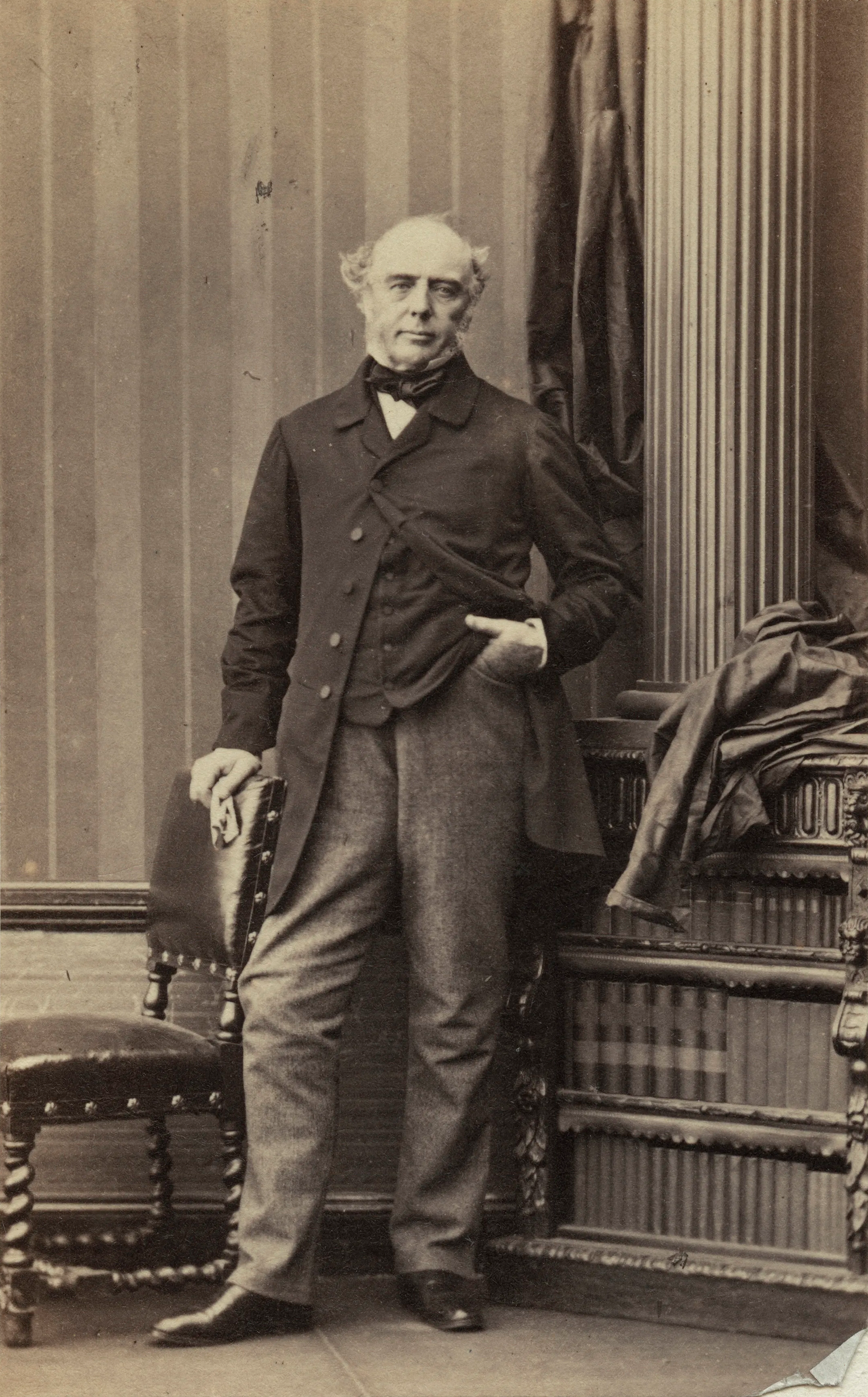
Portrait by Camille Silvy, 1861

William Constable-Maxwell, 10th Lord Herries of Terregles (25 August 1804 – 12 November 1876) was a Scottish peer and a landowner in England and Scotland. In 1858 he was restored to the peerage of Lord Herries of Terregles which had been lost by an ancestor in 1716.

== Early life ==
Constable-Maxwell was the eldest son of Marmaduke William Constable, later Constable-Maxwell, of Everingham, Yorkshire, and Caerlaverock Castle, Dumfrieshire, by his wife Theresa Appollonia Wakeman. His father died young, and in 1823 Constable-Maxwell was owner of the Yorkshire estate and was living at Everingham Hall with his widowed mother.

== Peerage ==
His father was the son and heir of William Haggerston, later Haggerston-Constable, of Everingham Park, by his wife Lady Winifred Maxwell (only surviving daughter and heiress of Hon. John Maxwell, Master of Nithsdale, son and heir apparent of William Maxwell, 5th Earl of Nithsdale, 9th Lord Herries of Terregles, by his wife Lady Winifred Herbert, a daughter of William Herbert, 1st Marquess of Powis). His great-great grandfather had been attainted following the Jacobite rising of 1715.

By an act of Parliament, Maxwell's Restitution Act 1848 (11 & 12 Vict. c. 23 Pr.), the descendants of the 5th Earl of Nithsdale were "restored in blood" to the Lordship of Herries of Terregles, but not to the earldom, and on 23 June 1858 the House of Lords allowed the peerage to Constable-Maxwell.

== Personal life ==
On 12 November 1835, Constable-Maxwell married Marcia Vavasour, eldest daughter of Sir Edward Marmaduke Joseph Stourton, later Vavasour. They had six children:

- Marmaduke Francis Constable-Maxwell (1837–1908), later the 11th Lord
- William Constable-Maxwell (1841–1903);
- Joseph Constable-Maxwell later Constable-Maxwell-Scott (1847–1923), who married Mary Monica Hope-Scott, only daughter of James Robert Hope-Scott of Abbotsford, third son of Sir Alexander Hope, by his wife Charlotte Harriet Jane Lockhart, daughter of John Gibson Lockhart and granddaughter of the author Walter Scott;
- Bernard Constable-Maxwell (1848–1938), a member of the Royal Company of Archers;
- Walter Constable Constable-Maxwell (1849–1925);
- Mary Anne Constable-Maxwell (died 1941), who married her cousin Edmund Constable-Maxwell-Stuart.

Lord Herries died on 12 November 1876 and was succeeded by his eldest son, Marmaduke.
