= Eva Primrose, Countess of Rosebery =

British nobility (1892-1987)

Eva Isabel Marion Primrose, Countess of Rosebery and Midlothian DBE JP (née Bruce; 17 June 1892 – 29 January 1987) was the English daughter of Henry Bruce, 2nd Baron Aberdare and his wife, Constance.

== Personal life ==
Eva Isabel Marion Bruce married, firstly, Algernon Strutt, 3rd Baron Belper on 26 April 1911 in St. Margaret's, Westminster. The couple were divorced in 1922 after having three children:

- Alexander Ronald George, later 4th Baron Belper (1912–1999)
- Hon. Michael Strutt (1914–1942)
- Hon. Lavinia Mary Strutt (1916–1995)

She married, secondly, to Harry Primrose, 6th Earl of Rosebery, on 24 June 1924 and they had two children:

- Neil Archibald, later 7th Earl of Rosebery (1929–2024)
- Lady Mary Primrose (1935–1935), who died at birth.

She was the mother-in-law of Bernard Fitzalan-Howard, 16th Duke of Norfolk who married her daughter, Lavinia Strutt, in 1937. She died on 29 January 1987, aged 94.

== Honours ==
She held the office of Justice of the Peace (JP) for Buckinghamshire. She was invested as a Dame Commander of the Order of the British Empire (DBE) in 1955. She was awarded an honorary doctorate of Laws (LL.D) from the University of Edinburgh in 1957. She was decorated with the Chevalier of the Legion of Honour.
