= Nick Hurd =

British Conservative politician (born 1962)

The Right Honourable Nick Hurd
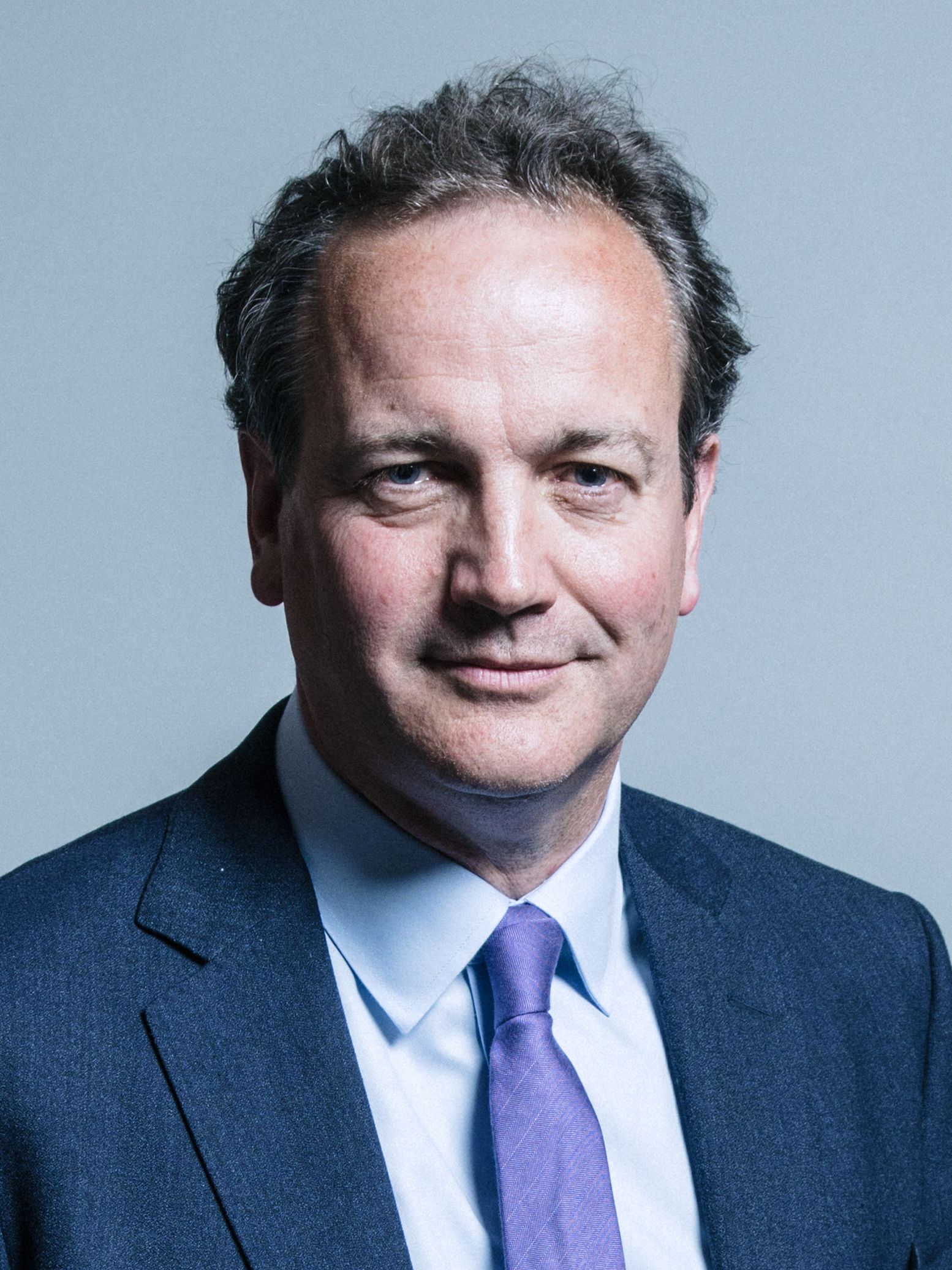
- Official portrait, 2017

Minister of State for Northern Ireland
- In office 25 July 2019 – 16 December 2019
- Prime Minister: Boris Johnson
- Preceded by: John Penrose
- Succeeded by: Robin Walker

Minister for London
- In office 14 November 2018 – 16 December 2019
- Prime Minister: Theresa May; Boris Johnson
- Preceded by: Jo Johnson
- Succeeded by: Chris Philp

Minister of State for Policing and the Fire Service
- In office 12 June 2017 – 25 July 2019
- Prime Minister: Theresa May
- Preceded by: Brandon Lewis
- Succeeded by: Kit Malthouse

Minister of State for Climate Change and Industry
- In office 16 July 2016 – 12 June 2017
- Prime Minister: Theresa May
- Preceded by: Andrea Leadsom
- Succeeded by: Claire Perry

Parliamentary Under-Secretary of State for International Development
- In office 28 November 2015 – 16 July 2016
- Prime Minister: David Cameron
- Preceded by: Grant Shapps
- Succeeded by: James Wharton

Minister for Civil Society
- In office 15 May 2010 – 14 July 2014
- Prime Minister: David Cameron
- Preceded by: Angela Smith
- Succeeded by: Brooks Newmark

Member of Parliament for Ruislip, Northwood and Pinner Ruislip-Northwood (2005–2010)
- In office 5 May 2005 – 6 November 2019
- Preceded by: John Wilkinson
- Succeeded by: David Simmonds

Personal details
- Born: 13 May 1962 (age 64) London, England
- Party: Conservative
- Spouses: Kim Richards (m. 1988; div. 2008) Lady Clare Kerr (m. 2010)
- Children: 6
- Parent(s): The Lord Hurd of Westwell; Tatiana Eyre
- Relatives: The Lord Hurd (grandfather); The 13th Marquess of Lothian (father-in-law)
- Education: Exeter College, Oxford
- Profession: Businessman

Nicholas Richard Hurd (born 13 May 1962) is a British politician who served as Minister for London from 2018 to 2019 and Minister of State for Policing and the Fire Service from 2017 to 2019. A member of the Conservative Party, he was the Member of Parliament (MP) for Ruislip, Northwood and Pinner from 2010 to 2019. Hurd was first elected as the MP for Ruislip-Northwood in 2005.

He served as Minister for Civil Society at the Department for Culture, Media and Sport in the Cameron Government from 15 May 2010 to 14 July 2014. On 28 November 2015, he was appointed Parliamentary Under-Secretary of State at the Department for International Development following the resignation of Grant Shapps.

In the May Government, Hurd served as Minister of State for Industry and Climate Change from 16 July 2016 to 12 June 2017 at the newly created Department for Business, Energy and Industrial Strategy, when he was appointed as Minister of State for Policing and the Fire Service. He served subsequently as Minister for London from 14 November 2018 to 16 December 2019. On 25 July 2019, he resigned as Minister for Policing, becoming Minister of State for Northern Ireland.

== Family and early life ==
Hurd is eldest son of the Conservative life peer Douglas Hurd, Baron Hurd of Westwell, a former Member of Parliament, Foreign Secretary under Margaret Thatcher and John Major, and a candidate in the 1990 leadership election. He is the fourth generation in the male line of his family to be elected to the House of Commons as a Conservative, following his father, grandfather and great-grandfather.

Hurd was educated at Sunningdale School and later at Eton College. He then studied at Exeter College, Oxford, (where he was a member of the Bullingdon Club).

After university, Hurd ran his own business and represented a British bank in Brazil. In 2002, he set up the Small Business Network to advise the Conservative Party on business policy. Later he worked as Chief of Staff to Tim Yeo MP, who at the time was Shadow Secretary of State for Environment and Transport, and in the Conservative Research Department.

== Parliamentary career ==
Hurd served as the Convenor of the Climate Change working group of the Conservative Party's Quality of Life Policy Group from 2006 to 2008. He has also served as a member of the Environmental Audit Select Committee (EAC) before becoming a minister. In May 2016, he was given the Green Ribbon Political Award as Parliamentarian of the year (MP), citing his work on the EAC and in promoting action against climate change while at DFID where he led the Energy Africa initiative promoting greater access to sustainable energy.

Hurd came top in the Private member's bill ballot in November 2006, and introduced the Sustainable Communities Bill into the House of Commons. This achieved its third reading in June 2007 and after being passed by the House of Lords, the Sustainable Communities Act 2007 received Royal Assent in October 2007.

In 2016, Hurd supported remain at the 2016 United Kingdom European Union membership referendum.

Hurd was promoted by David Cameron to the Opposition Whips' office in July 2007. He served as Opposition Whip until his appointment as Shadow Minister for Charities, Social Enterprise and Volunteering in October 2008. Hurd succeeded Amber Rudd as Minister for Climate Change and Industry, and served from July 2016 to June 2017. He was previously Parliamentary Under Secretary of State at the Department for International Development from November 2015 following the resignation of Grant Shapps until the reshuffle following the appointment of Theresa May as Prime Minister in July 2016. During the Cameron–Clegg coalition he served as Minister for Civil Society from May 2010 until July 2014, during which time he led the work on setting up the National Citizen Service and Big Society Capital.

Hurd announced his intention not to stand in the 2019 general election, citing personal reasons. He did not resign any of his ministerial roles and continued in them until the formation of the next government.

== Career outside Parliament ==
After leaving Parliament Hurd took a role at Francis Maude Associates, a consultancy established by Francis Maude and Simone Finn. In 2021, he chaired the G7's Impact Taskforce focused on mobilizing private capital by advocating for globally consistent standards to measure, value, and account for sustainability.

== Personal life ==
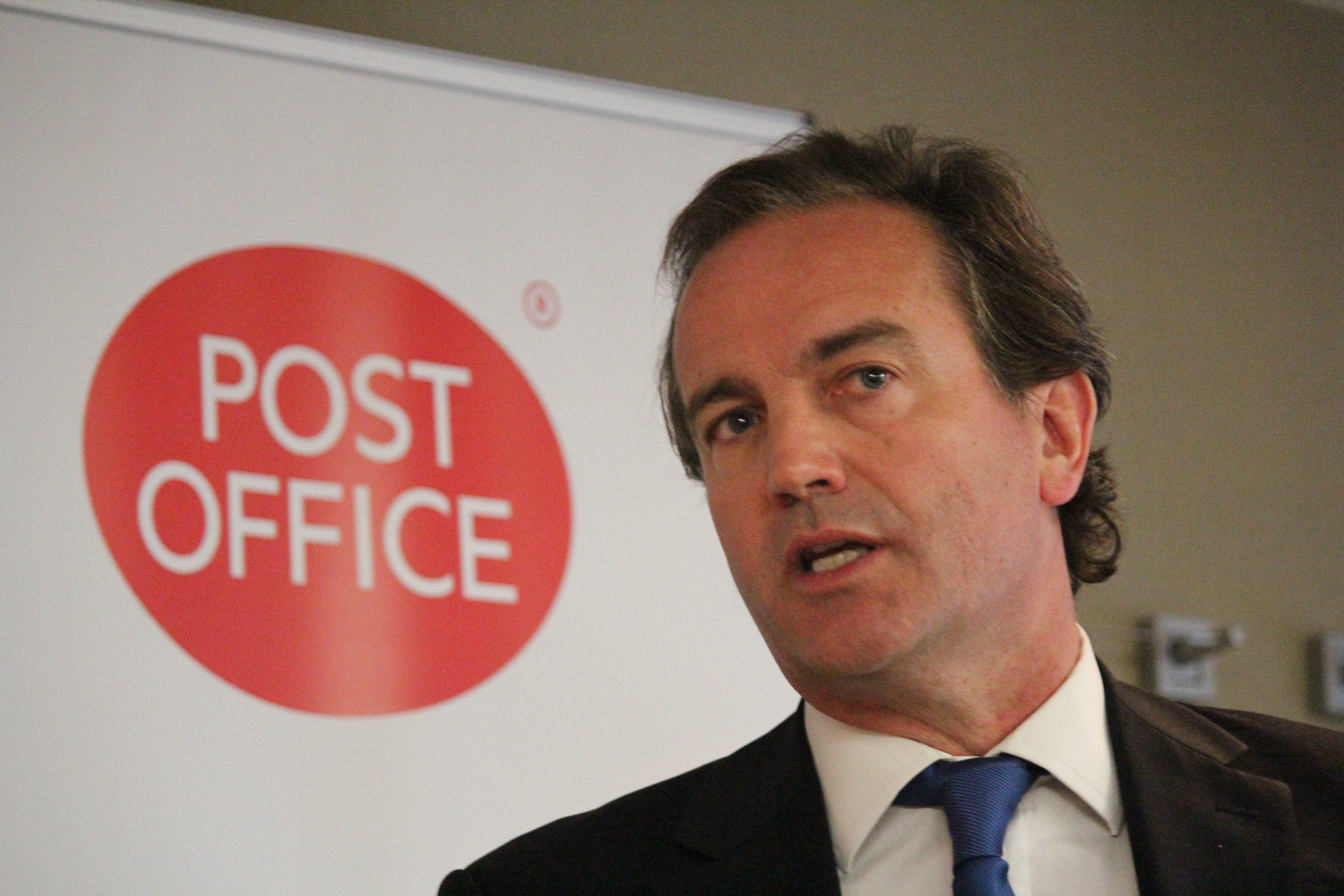
Hurd speaking in 2013

Hurd met his first wife Kim Richards at Oxford University, and they married at Eton Chapel in 1988. The couple had two sons and two daughters together. In 2008, they divorced after twenty years of marriage.

In 2010, Hurd married Lady Clare Kerr, daughter of the Conservative politician the 13th Marquess of Lothian (commonly known as Michael Ancram), after having met at a party the previous year. On 17 May 2012, Lady Clare Hurd gave birth to a baby girl, Leila. A son, Caspar Jamie Hurd, was born on 30 September 2014.

Hurd's wife is heiress presumptive to the Lordship of Herries of Terregles, currently held by her mother, the Marchioness of Lothian. The couple's son is second in the line of succession to the lordship.

He is a governor of Coteford Junior School, a Freeman of the City of London and a Liveryman of the Worshipful Company of Grocers.

== Honours ==
- He was sworn in as a member of the Privy Council of the United Kingdom in 2017. This gave him the right to the honorific title "The Right Honourable" for life.

== Notes ==
Parliament of the United Kingdom
Preceded by John Wilkinson	Member of Parliament for Ruislip-Northwood; 2005–2010	Constituency abolished
New constituency	Member of Parliament for Ruislip, Northwood and Pinner; 2010–2019	Succeeded by David Simmonds
