= Anne Cowdrey, 14th Lady Herries of Terregles =

British racehorse trainer and peeress

The Right Honourable The Lady Herries of Terregles
- Born: Lady Anne Elizabeth Fitzalan-Howard; 12 June 1938
- Died: 23 November 2014 (aged 76)
- Spouse: Colin Cowdrey, Baron Cowdrey of Tonbridge (m. 1985; died 2000)
- Parents: Bernard Fitzalan-Howard, 16th Duke of Norfolk (father); The Hon. Lavinia Sturtt (mother)
- Family: Fitzalan-Howard family

Anne Elizabeth Cowdrey, 14th Lady Herries of Terregles, Baroness Cowdrey of Tonbridge (née Fitzalan-Howard; 12 June 1938 – 23 November 2014) was a British racehorse trainer and peeress.

== Early life and family ==
Born Lady Anne Fitzalan-Howard on 12 June 1938, she was the eldest of four daughters of Bernard Fitzalan-Howard, 16th Duke of Norfolk and The Hon. Lavinia Strutt. She had three younger sisters: Mary (who succeeded her as 15th Lady Herries of Terregles), Sarah, and Jane (presently 16th Lady Herries of Terregles). She grew up at the family seat Arundel Castle in West Sussex. She was educated at the Priory School at Arundel and the Convent of the Sacred Heart, Woldingham.

== Career ==
From 1970 to 1979 she lived at Everingham in the East Riding of Yorkshire, where she was Master of Foxhounds for the Middleton Hunt, before returning to the Arundel area. She began training racehorses at Angmering in 1983.

Herries operated as a racehorse trainer for over thirty years from the Angmering Park estate, on the South Downs, near Arundel, Sussex. The most notable horse she trained was the Racing Post Trophy and Prix du Jockey Club winner Celtic Swing, who was crowned the champion two-year-old of 1994. She also had success in the King Edward VII Stakes, Great Voltigeur Stakes, Coronation Cup and Grand Prix de Saint-Cloud with Sheriff's Star. Amongst her other notable horses was Taufan's Melody who won the Caulfield Cup in Australia at odds of 66–1 in 1998, while she won the Wetherby Pattern Chase, Eider Chase and Rowland Meyrick Handicap Chase with Set Point in the 1970s. She trained fewer winners in later years, but her 2014 record of seven flat winners had been one of her highest for several seasons.

Upon the death of her father in 1975 without a son, Lady Anne as the eldest daughter inherited the Herries of Terregles title, a Scottish Lordship of Parliament, and became the 14th Lady Herries of Terregles. The dukedom and her father's other titles passed to his heir male, Miles Fitzalan-Howard. From 1975 until the reform of the House of Lords in 1999, Herries was eligible to sit in the Lords but chose not to do so.

== Personal life ==
In 1985, Herries married England cricketer Colin Cowdrey, the couple remained married until Cowdrey's death in 2000. Herries died in 2014, aged 76, from pneumonia.

Peerage of Scotland
Preceded by Bernard Fitzalan-Howard	Lady Herries of Terregles; 1975–2014	Succeeded by Mary Mumford
