= Lavinia Fitzalan-Howard, Duchess of Norfolk =

British noblewoman (1916–1995)

Her Grace The Duchess of Norfolk LG CBE
- The Duchess of Norfolk, 1939
- Born: Lavinia Mary Strutt; 22 March 1916; Kingston Hall, Nottinghamshire, England
- Died: 10 December 1995 (aged 79); Arundel Castle, West Sussex, England
- Spouse: Bernard Fitzalan-Howard, 16th Duke of Norfolk
- Children: Anne Cowdrey, 14th Lady Herries of Terregles; Mary Mumford, 15th Lady Herries of Terregles; Lady Sarah Clutton; Jane Kerr, Marchioness of Lothian
- Parent(s): Algernon Strutt, 3rd Baron Belper; Eva Bruce

Lavinia Mary Fitzalan-Howard, Duchess of Norfolk (née Strutt; 22 March 1916 – 10 December 1995) was a British noblewoman.

== Life ==
Born Lavinia Mary Strutt, she was the only daughter of Algernon Strutt, 3rd Baron Belper, and his wife, Eva. She was educated at Abbot's Hill School. On 27 January 1937, she married Bernard Fitzalan-Howard, 16th Duke of Norfolk at the Brompton Oratory. She did not convert to Roman Catholicism, her husband's religion. They had four daughters, only one (the youngest) of whom has children:

- Lady Anne Fitzalan-Howard, later 14th Lady Herries of Terregles (1938–2014); married Colin Cowdrey, Baron Cowdrey of Tonbridge
- Lady Mary Fitzalan-Howard, later 15th Lady Herries of Terregles (1940–2017); married Anthony Mumford
- Lady Sarah Fitzalan-Howard (1941–2015); married Nigel Clutton
- Lady Jane Fitzalan-Howard, later 16th Lady Herries of Terregles (b. 1945); married Michael Kerr, 13th Marquess of Lothian

At the coronation of King George VI and Queen Elizabeth in 1937, the Duchess of Norfolk was one of four duchesses who held the canopy above Queen Elizabeth during the latter's anointing. In 1953, she took the part of Queen Elizabeth II during dress rehearsals for the coronation at Westminster Abbey. The Duke of Norfolk was hereditary Earl Marshal and organised both coronations as well as important state events in later years.

=== Charities ===
The Duchess was involved with many charities and was appointed a CBE in 1971 for her work. Among firsts for women, she was the first woman Lord Lieutenant as Lord Lieutenant of West Sussex from 1975 (a post she took over from her husband after his death that year), first woman steward of Goodwood from 1975 and the first non-royal Lady Companion of the Order of the Garter.

The Duchess was Princess Anne's predecessor in the presidency of the Riding for the Disabled Association. The presidency passed from the Duchess to the Princess in 1986.

=== Sport ===
For many years, the traditional curtain-raiser to the English international cricket season was a match between Lavinia, Duchess of Norfolk's XI and the visitors, played at Arundel Castle. It played on in the Duchess' name after the Duke's death in 1975, reverting to its original name after her own death in 1995.

The Duchess was an owner of racehorses: her best winners included Moon Madness, Sheriff's Star and Lucky Moon (Goodwood Cup).

== Arms ==
Coat of arms of Lavinia Marie Fitzalan-Howard, Duchess of Norfolk, LG, CBE
Coronet Coronet of a Duchess Escutcheon On a lozenge, Quarterly 1st Gules on a bend between six crosses crosslet fitchy Argent, the Flodden augmentation in chief (Howard); 2nd England a label Argent (Brotherton); 3rd checky Or and Azure (Warren); 4th Gules a lion rampant Or (Fitzalan); impaling per pale Sable and Azure two chevronels engrailed between three crosses crosslet fitchy Or (Strutt). Orders Lady Companion of the Order of the Garter

Honorary titles
Preceded by The Duke of Norfolk	Lord Lieutenant of West Sussex; 1975–1995	Succeeded by The Duke of Richmond
