= Heil unserm König, Heil! =

Royal anthem for Bavaria and Greece

English: 'Hail to Our King, Hail!'
- Coat of arms of Bavaria (1835–1918)
- Former royal anthem of Greece and unofficial anthem of Bavaria
- Also known as: «Χαίρε ο βασιλιάς!» (English: 'Hail to the King!')
- Music: "God Save the King"
- Succeeded by: Ὕμνος εἰς τὴν Ἐλευθερίαν (in Greece); Bayernhymne (in Bavaria)

Audio sample
- Instrumental rendition in B major: file; help

"Heil unserm König, Heil!" ('Hail to Our King, Hail!') was the royal anthem of the Kingdom of Bavaria and the Kingdom of Greece. The song whose lyrics have varied over the decades and which has never been formally declared a national anthem, was one of the numerous German state anthems set to the melody of 'God Save the King' which often began with the same line of lyrics.

== Lyrics ==
During the reign of Luitpold as a prince regent, there was a variation known as Regentenhymne (The Regent's Hymn) in which the words "unserm König" were replaced by "dem Regenten (to the regent)" in the title and in the first stanza, and also "edler König" in the fourth verse being replaced by "bester Herrscher (best ruler)".

German original

Heil unserm König, Heil!
Lang Leben sei sein Teil,
Erhalt’ ihn Gott!
Gerecht und fromm und mild,
Ist er dein Ebenbild,
Ist er dein Ebenbild,
Gott, gieb ihm Glück!

Fest ist des Königs Thron,
Die Wahrheit seine Kron’
Und Recht sein Schwert;
Von Vaterlieb’ erfüllt,
Regiert er gross und mild,
Regiert er gross und mild,
Heil sei ihm! Heil!

O heil’ge Flamme, glüh’,
Glüh und verlösche nie
Fürs Vaterland!
Wir alle stehen dann
Voll Kraft für einen Mann,
Voll Kraft für einen Mann,
Fürs Vaterland.

Sei, edler König, hier
Noch lang’ des Volkes Zier,
Der Menschheit Stolz!
Der hohe Ruhm ist dein,
Der Deinen Lust zu sein,
Der Deinen Lust zu sein.
Heil, Herrscher, dir!

English translation

Hail to our king, hail!
Long may his portion be,
God save the King!
Just and pious and mild,
If he is thine image,
If he is thine image,
God grant him bliss!

Firm is the king's throne,
Truth is his coronal
And right is his sword;
Filled with fatherly love,
If he rules great and mildly,
If he rules great and mildly,
Hail to him! Hail!

O holy flame, glow,
Glow and never fade
For the fatherland!
We shall all then stand
Full of strength for one man,
Full of strength for one man,
For the fatherland.

Be here long, noble king,
For the people's adornment,
The pride of humanity!
The great glory is thine,
To be thy delight,
To be thy delight.
Hail, ruler, to thee!

=== Greek version ===
During the establishment of King Otto of Greece, the Bavarian anthem was used. The following Greek verses were used:

Greek lyrics

Τον βασιλέα μας
Όθωνα τον πρώτον
σώσον, Θεέ.
Αύξησον, κράτυνον
την βασιλείαν του,
τον βασιλέα μας
σώσον, Θεέ.

English translation

Our King
Otto the First
Save thou, O God.
Increase, strengthen
His kingdom
Our King
Save thou, O God.
