= Carl Harries =

German chemist (1866–1923)

Carl Dietrich Harries
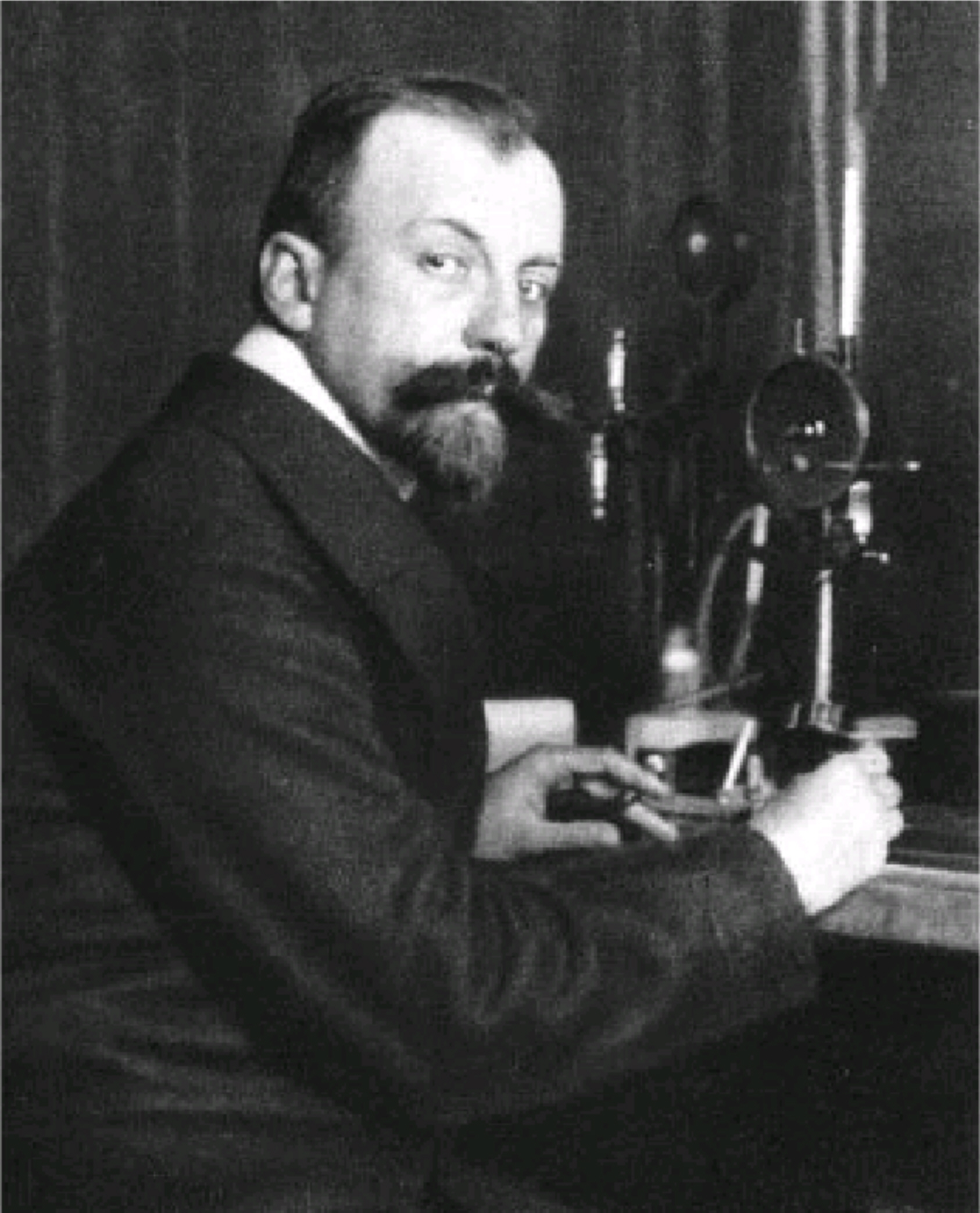
- Carl Dietrich Harries (c. 1906)
- Born: 5 August 1866; Luckenwalde, Prussia, Germany
- Died: 3 November 1923 (aged 57); Berlin, Germany
- Education: University of Berlin
- Awards: Liebig Medal (1912)
- Scientific career
- Workplaces: University of Kiel
- Doctoral advisor: Ferdinand Tiemann

Carl Dietrich Harries (5 August 1866 – 3 November 1923) was a German chemist born in Luckenwalde, Brandenburg, Prussia. He received his doctorate in 1892. In 1900, he married Hertha von Siemens, daughter of the electrical genius Werner von Siemens, and the inventor of one of the earliest ozone generators. In 1904, he moved as full professor to the University of Kiel, where he remained until 1916. During that time he published numerous papers on ozonolysis. His major publication detailing ozonolysis was published in Liebigs Ann. Chem. 1905, 343, 311. Dissatisfied with academic life and having failed to obtain either of two positions at universities, he left academia to become director of research at Siemens and Halske. He died on 3 November 1923 of complications following surgery for cancer. He was buried at Stahnsdorf South-Western Cemetery near Berlin.

His great-grandfather was the German theologian Heinrich Harries.

== Accomplishments ==
He investigated polymers and rubber. He showed that rubber consisted of repeating units. He established experimental procedures for ozonolysis, demonstrated the generality of the reaction of unsaturated compounds with ozone, and showed that ozone could be used for the synthesis of a variety of compounds.
