= D. C. Harries =

Welsh photographer (died 1940)

David Harries or D. C. Harries (the 'C' was fictional to distinguish him from others of the same name locally) was a Welsh photographer who operated from premises in Llandeilo, Llandovery and Ammanford from approximately 1888 until his death in 1940 aged 75. He photographed coal mining at the South Wales Coalfield near Ammanford, and limestone mines at Llandybie. He also photographed his friend, industrialist Isaac Haley, at his mansion in Glanbran. In 1976, his collection of glass negatives, 800 in total, were donated to the National Library of Wales by Hugh Newton Harries, his last living son. In December 2014, his military portraits were the subject of a 2014 paper given at the Understanding British Portraits seminar at the National Portrait Gallery, London. Harries had captured approximately 800 portraits during World War I. The subjects of these portraits were mostly the soldiers of the Welch Regiment and their families. However, all of these portraits did not have dates and their subjects were never named by Harries.
