= Baron Belper =

Barony in the Peerage of the United Kingdom

Arms of the Barons Belper

Baron Belper, of Belper in the County of Derbyshire, is a title in the Peerage of the United Kingdom. It was created in 1856 for the Liberal politician Edward Strutt, Chancellor of the Duchy of Lancaster from 1853 to 1854. He was son of William Strutt and the grandson of the inventor Jedediah Strutt. Lord Belper's son, the second Baron, represented Derbyshire East and Berwick in the House of Commons as a Liberal. As of 2017 the title is held by the latter's great-grandson, the fifth Baron, who succeeded his father in 1999.

The mountaineer Edward Lisle Strutt was the son of Arthur Strutt, younger son of the first Baron.

The family seat was Kingston Hall, near Nottingham, Nottinghamshire.

== Baron Belper (1856) ==
- Edward Strutt, 1st Baron Belper (1801–1880)
- Henry Strutt, 2nd Baron Belper (1840–1914)
- Algernon Henry Strutt, 3rd Baron Belper (1883–1956)
- (Alexander) Ronald George Strutt, 4th Baron Belper (1912–1999)
- Richard Henry Strutt, 5th Baron Belper (born 1941)

The heir apparent is the present holder's son, the Hon. Michael Henry Strutt (born 1969).

=== Title succession chart ===
Title succession chart, Barons Belper.

Edward Strutt; 1st Baron Belper; 1801–1880
William Strutt; 1838–1856	Henry Strutt; 2nd Baron Belper; 1840–1914
William Strutt; 1875–1898	Reginald Strutt; 1881–1888	Algernon Strutt; 3rd Baron Belper; 1883–1956
Ronald Strutt; 4th Baron Belper; 1912–1999
Richard Strutt; 5th Baron Belper born 1941
Hon. Michael Strutt born 1969
