= Heinrich Harries =

German pastor

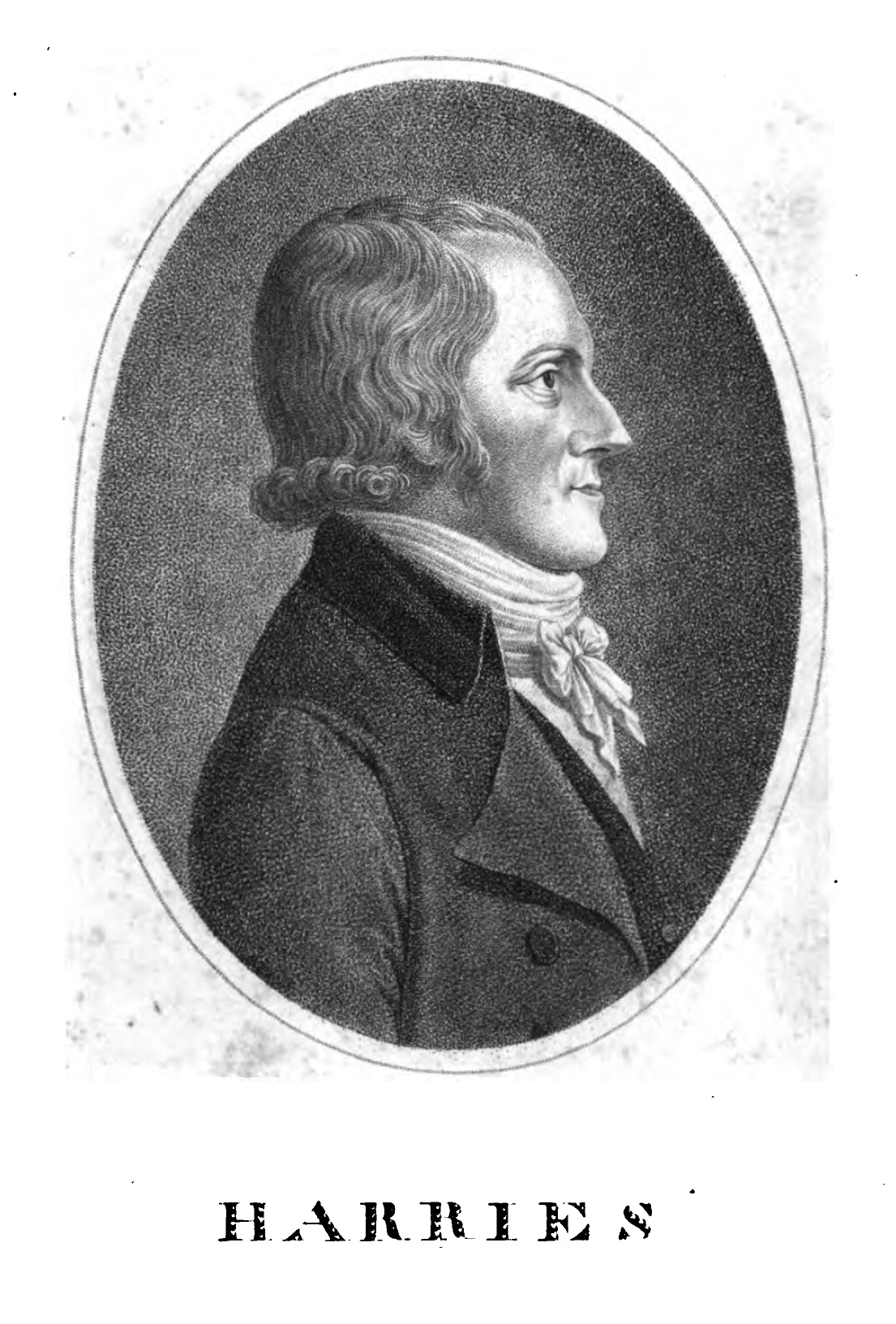
Heinrich Harries

Heinrich Harries (9 September 1762, Flensburg – 28 September 1802) was a German Protestant pastor from the Duchy of Schleswig, then under Danish sovereignty.

Harries wrote the lyrics for "Heil dir im Siegerkranz" for King Christian VII of Denmark in 1790; the song was later adapted to be the unofficial national anthem of the German Empire.

Harries was born in Flensburg and died in Brügge in Schleswig-Holstein.

His great-grandson was the German chemist Carl Harries.
