= Dan Harries =

American artist and professor

Dan M. Harries (born 1963, in Pomona, California) is an artist and theorist of visual culture and media. After twenty years as a professor in Australia, England, and the U.S., and well known for his theories of parody, new media, postmodernism and the image, Harries began to put his teachings into practice and pursue his art full-time. In 2008, he established his studio, Harries + Fayé, in Hollywood's historic Artisan's Patio Complex. His limited edition abstract photographs explore his theories of intertextuality and ambiguity. He currently exhibits his photographs at the Amy-Lauren Gallery on Kauai and at his studio.

In 1993, Harries began his academic career at Griffith University, in Brisbane, Australia, where he lectured in film and television studies. In 1994, he developed a film and media directory Web site, CineMedia, which in 1997 was nominated in the "Film and Television" category for the 1st Annual Webby Awards. In 1995, Harries moved back to Los Angeles to take up the position of the American Film Institute's first Director of Online Media where his team worked on a number of online projects, including the 1996 launch of the world's first streaming video site devoted to classic Hollywood movies. The first movie to be streamed was Charlie Chaplin's silent 1916 classic, "The Rink." In 1998, Harries moved to London where he was head of the Visual Culture and Media Department at Middlesex University until 2003.

Harries has a B.A in sociology from UCLA, an MA in Film Studies from the University of East Anglia, and a PhD from UCLA in Film & Television. His books include Film & Video on the Internet, Film Parody, and The New Media Book. He serves on the editorial board of the journal of visual culture. He currently lives in Los Angeles with his husband and daughter.
