= Julian Harriss =

Julian Harriss (August 15, 1914 – January 3, 1989) is a member of the Tennessee Newspaper Hall of Fame. He was inducted in 1996. Plaques honoring members of this HOF hang on the wall of the University of Tennessee's College of Communication and Information Studies.

Upon Harriss' death in 1989, the Tennessee House of Representatives honored him by passing a resolution acknowledging his contributions to the state and its flagship university.

Harriss served as the University of Tennessee's director of public relations for over 30 years serving under four university presidents. In addition to his PR duties, Harriss co-authored a textbook on reporting with Stanley Johnson and Kelly Leiter. The book, The Complete Reporter, has been translated into numerous languages and been used by colleges and universities around the world.

In addition to the accomplishments noted above, Harriss helped found the University of Tennessee's journalism program. This program later expanded and became what is known today as the College of Communication and Information.

Harriss, a distant relative of author and journalist Joel Chandler Harris, was married to his wife, Virginia, for over 50 years. They had three sons (Robert, David, and Gerald). All three sons graduated from UT as did two of his grandchildren (Chandler and Molly). Julian devoted his life to the University of Tennessee and his efforts are marked by a public relations scholarship that is awarded annually in his name.
