= Dudley Hervey =

British colonial administrative service officer (1849-1911)

Dudley Hervey CMG JP
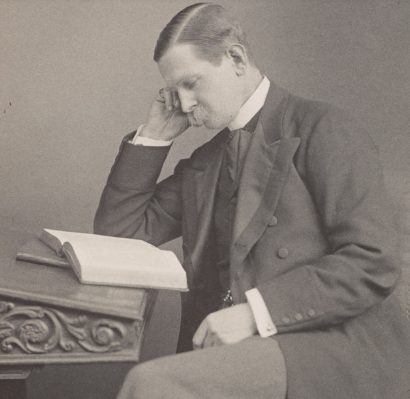
- c. 1890s
- Born: Dudley Francis Amelius Hervey; 7 January 1849; Great Chesterford, Essex
- Died: 1 June 1911 (aged 62); Aldeburgh, Suffolk
- Occupation: Colonial administrative service officer
- Years active: 1867–1893
- Children: 1 son and 1 daughter

Dudley Francis Amelius Hervey (7 January 1849 – 1 June 1911) was a British colonial administrative service officer.

== Early life and education ==
Hervey was born on 7 January 1849 in Great Chesterford, Essex, and was the second son of Rev. Lord Charles Hervey, whose father was the 1st Marquess of Bristol. He was educated at Marlborough College.

== Career ==
After completing his education he joined the Colonial Service as a cadet in 1867, and went to the Straits Settlements. In 1868, he passed the examination in Malay, and the following year was appointed acting private secretary to the Governor of the Straits Settlements. In 1870, he was chief clerk and interpreter to the Lieutenant-Governor of Penang, and accompanied HMS Algerine to Sumatra to inquire into various cases of piracy. In 1871, he was senior clerk in the Supreme Court, Singapore, clerk in bankruptcy and acting magistrate. He served as Resident Councillor at Malacca from 1883 to 1895. He was also a Member of the Executive and Legislative Councils of the Straits Settlements. He had temporary charge of the State of Sungei Ujong in 1884 and the Negri Sembilan States from 1883 to 1886, in addition to his duties as Resident Councillor.

He retired in 1893 to Aldeburgh, Suffolk, where he served as Justice of the Peace, and took an active part in municipal and educational matters.

He was a Fellow of the Royal Colonial Institute; a Member of Royal Asiatic Society in London, and a Fellow of the Royal Geographical Society. He was a scholar of the Malay language and published a book on Malay grammar, and wrote many papers for the Journal of the Royal Asiatic Society.

== Personal life and death ==
Hervey married Griselda Mary Theophile Campbell in 1894 and they had a son and a daughter. He died on 1 June 1911 at Aldeburgh, Suffolk, following an accident. In 1906, his residence, Belstead House, was converted into a school by his widow who served for many years as its headmistress.

== Honours ==
Hervey was appointed Companion of the Order of St Michael and St George (CMG) in the 1892 New Years Honours.
