= Herbert Herries, 1st Lord Herries of Terregles =

Herbert Herries, 1st Lord Herries of Terregles (died c. 1505), was a Scottish peer.

Herries was summoned to the Scottish Parliament as Lord Herries of Terregles in 1490. He died about 1505 and was succeeded in the lordship of Parliament by his son Andrew.

== Notes ==
Peerage of Scotland
New creation	Lord Herries of Terregles; 1490–c. 1505	Succeeded by Andrew Herries
