= Lord Herries of Terregles =

Scottish peerage title

Lordship of Herries of Terregles
- Creation date: 3 February 1490
- Peerage: Peerage of Scotland
- First holder: Herbert Herries, 1st Lord Herries of Terregles
- Present holder: Jane Kerr, Dowager Marchioness of Lothian
- Heir presumptive: Lady Clare Therese Hurd, Mistress of Terregles
- Remainder to: Heirs general

Lord Herries of Terregles (pronounced "Heh-reez of Ter-regulls'") is a hereditary title in the Peerage of Scotland. It was created in 1490 for Herbert Herries with remainder to his heirs general.

On the death of his grandson, William, 3rd Lord Herries of Terregles, the male line failed. He was succeeded by his daughter Agnes, who married Sir John Maxwell, second son of Robert Maxwell, fifth Lord Maxwell. Their great-grandson, the 7th Lord Herries of Terregles, succeeded as third Earl of Nithsdale in 1667 on the death of his kinsman the second Earl. The earldom had been created in 1620 for Robert Maxwell, ninth Lord Maxwell. The third Earl's grandson, the fifth Earl, took part in the Jacobite rising of 1715. He was attainted in 1716, his peerages forfeited and sentenced to death. However, he managed to make a celebrated escape from the Tower of London by changing clothes with his wife's maid the day before his execution.

His granddaughter Winifred married William Haggerston-Constable, second son of Sir Carnaby Haggerston, 3rd Bt, of Haggerston Castle, Northumberland (see Constable-Maxwell-Scott baronets). Their son Marmaduke assumed the surname of Constable-Maxwell. His son William Constable-Maxwell and the descendants of the fifth Earl of Nithsdale were restored by Maxwell's Restitution Act 1848 (11 & 12 Vict. c. 23 Pr.) and in 1858 William Constable-Maxwell succeeded as 10th Lord Herries of Terregles. He was succeeded in 1876 by his son, Marmaduke Constable-Maxwell (married 1875 the Hon. Angela Fitzalan-Howard, daughter of the first Baron Howard of Glossop) as 11th Lord Herries of Terregles, (Note: This page by a family member, in remainder to the title, has paintings of the 10th and 11th Baron with their brothers; retrieved 6 December 2012 Everingham Park from the British Towns and Villages Network (online); last updated January 2009; retrieved 6 December 2012. In 1962 Lady Anne Fitzalan-Howard asked to live at Everingham, the home of her paternal grandmother, and the Duke made it habitable for her.) who served as Lord Lieutenant of the East Riding of Yorkshire from 1880 and Lord Lieutenant of Kirkcudbrightshire from 1885 until 1908 – he was created, in 1884, Baron Herries of Carleverock Castle in the County of Dumfries and of Everingham in the East Riding of the County of York, in the Peerage of the United Kingdom. This title became extinct upon his death in 1908, as he had no sons. He was succeeded in the Lordship by his daughter, the 12th Lady Herries of Terregles, who married her first cousin once removed Henry Fitzalan-Howard, 15th Duke of Norfolk. On her death in 1945 the title was inherited by her only son Bernard Fitzalan-Howard, 16th Duke of Norfolk, who became the 13th Lord Herries of Terregles. (Note: Everingham Park was sold in 1982 along with nearly 3,000 acres after nearly 800 years in the same line of descent. The estate was dismantled by the new owner, and the whereabouts of the contents are unknown.) When he died in 1975 the dukedom passed to his second cousin-once-removed, the 17th Duke, while he was succeeded in the Lordship by the eldest of his four daughters, the 14th holder of the title. In 1985 Lady Herries of Terregles married the cricketer Colin Cowdrey, created a life peer as Baron Cowdrey of Tonbridge in 1997. Lady Herries died in 2014 when her sister, Lady Mary Mumford DCVO, heiress of the line, succeeded her as the 15th Lady Herries of Terregles. Following her death in 2017 the current and 16th holder of the title is her younger sister Jane Kerr, Dowager Marchioness of Lothian, widow of Conservative politician Michael Kerr, 13th Marquess of Lothian. (Note: The current Lady Herries now lives at Angmering park)

The Lordship is named after Terregles, in Kirkcudbrightshire in south west Scotland.

== Lords Herries of Terregles (1490) ==
- Herbert Herries, 1st Lord Herries of Terregles (d. 1505)
- Andrew Herries, 2nd Lord Herries of Terregles (c. 1477–k. 1513 at Flodden Field)
- William Herries, 3rd Lord Herries of Terregles (d. 1543)
- Agnes Maxwell, 4th Lady Herries of Terregles (c. 1534–1594) (see also: John Maxwell, 4th Lord Herries of Terregles)

Maxwell arms

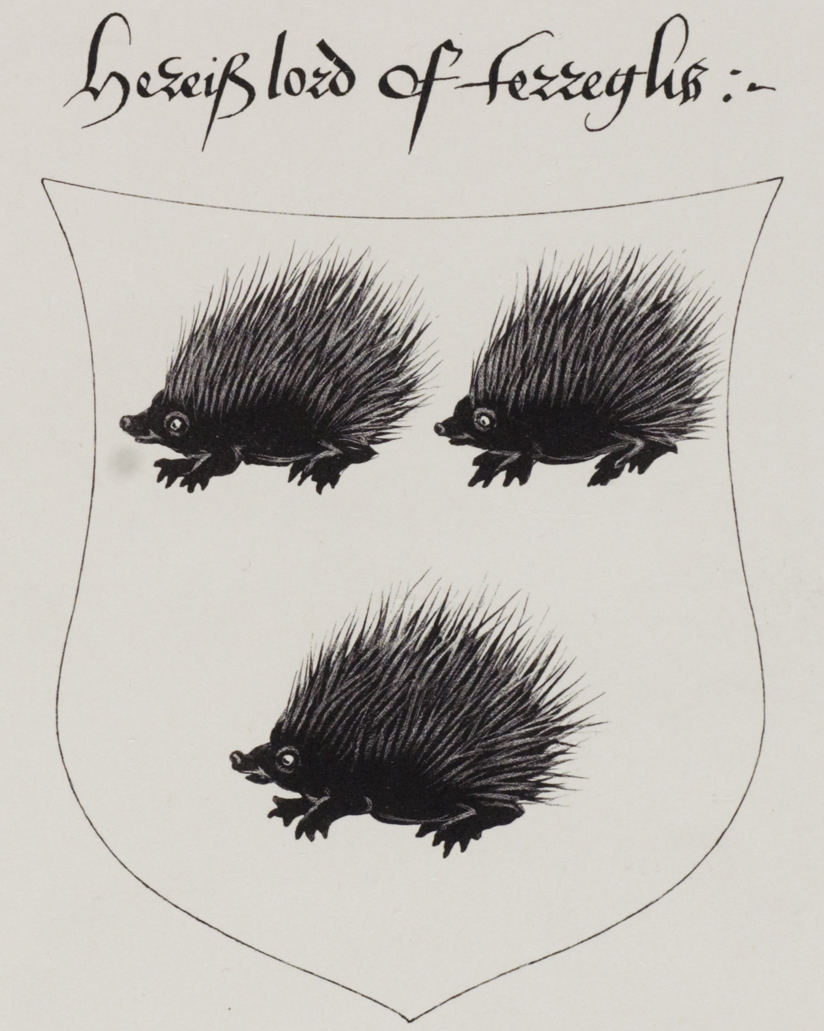
Herries arms

- William Maxwell, 5th Lord Herries of Terregles (c. 1555–1604)
- John Maxwell, 6th Lord Herries of Terregles (d. 1631)
- John Maxwell, 3rd Earl of Nithsdale, 7th Lord Herries of Terregles (d. 1677)
- Robert Maxwell, 4th Earl of Nithsdale, 8th Lord Herries of Terregles (d. 1696)
- William Maxwell, 5th Earl of Nithsdale, 9th Lord Herries of Terregles (d. 1744); attainted 1716
- William Constable-Maxwell, 10th Lord Herries of Terregles (1804–1876); great-great grandson of the 9th Lord, restored 1858
- Marmaduke Constable-Maxwell, 11th Lord Herries of Terregles, 1st Baron Herries (1837–1908)
- Gwendolen Mary Fitzalan-Howard, Duchess of Norfolk, 12th Lady Herries of Terregles (1877–1945)
- Bernard Marmaduke Fitzalan-Howard, 16th Duke of Norfolk, 13th Lord Herries of Terregles (1908–1975)
- Anne Elizabeth Cowdrey, 14th Lady Herries of Terregles, Lady Cowdrey of Tonbridge, (1938–2014)
- Mary Katherine Mumford, 15th Lady Herries of Terregles (1940–2017)
- Theresa Jane Kerr, Dowager Marchioness of Lothian, 16th Lady Herries of Terregles (born 1945)

The heir presumptive is the 16th holder's elder daughter, Lady Clare Therese Hurd, Mistress of Terregles (born 1979), who is married to the former Conservative MP Nick Hurd.

== See also ==
- Earl of Nithsdale
- Constable-Maxwell-Scott baronets
- Baron Howard of Glossop
- Duke of Norfolk
- Terregles House
