= Harris (surname) =

Family name

- Pronunciation: /ˈhærɪs/

Origin
- Region of origin: England; Wales

Other names
- Variant form: Harries
- Related names: Parry, Perry, Harrison

Harris is an English and Welsh patronymic surname derived from the personal name Harry (a vernacular form of Henry) and the genitive ending -s. The given name Henry itself was introduced to England as Henri by the Normans following the Conquest of 1066, and subsequently became widespread, giving rise to surnames such as Harris and "Harrison". It is also found in Ireland, largely as a result of the Plantation of Ulster, though it may in some cases represent an anglicized form of the Gaelic name Ó hEarchadha.

Other surnames with the same meaning include Harries, Parry and Perry (derived from the Welsh ap Harri), and Harrison.

== Distribution ==
=== United Kingdom ===
Harris is most frequent in South Wales and was the 22nd most common name throughout Wales in 2020. For the latest available census data from 2010, the British government did not generate a list of surname frequencies.

=== United States ===
For the latest available census data from 2010, Harris ranked as the 25th most frequent surname in the US with 624,252 entries. Harrison ranked as the 141st most common surname in the US with 181,091 entries.
