= Gwendolen Fitzalan-Howard, Duchess of Norfolk =

British noblewoman (1877-1945)

Her Grace The Duchess of Norfolk
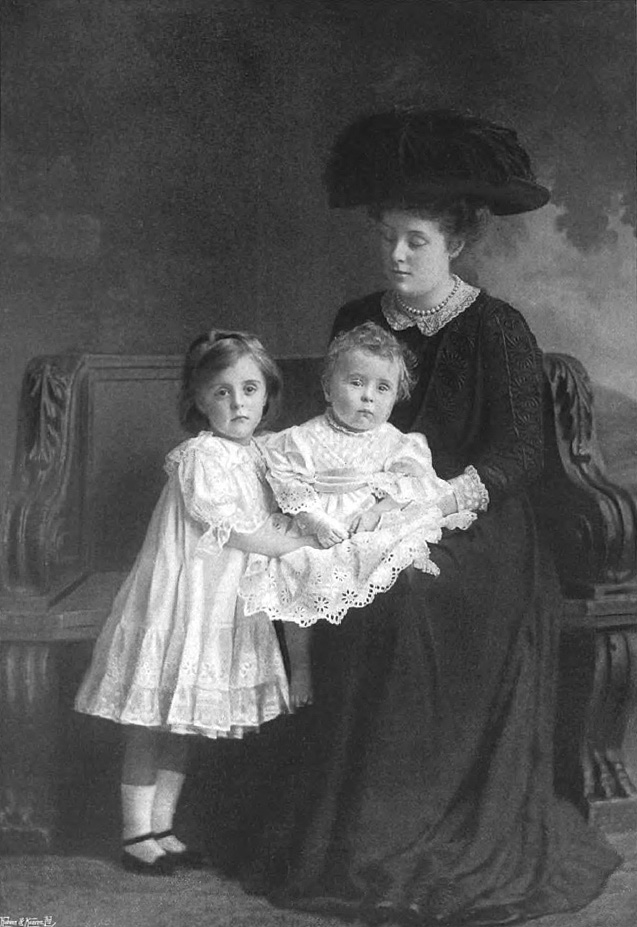
- The Duchess of Norfolk with her children Rachel and Bernard
- Born: 11 January 1877
- Died: 28 August 1945 (aged 68); Kinharvie House, New Abbey, Scotland
- Resting place: Arundel Castle, Sussex, England
- Spouse: Henry Fitzalan-Howard, 15th Duke of Norfolk (m. 1904; died 1917)
- Children: Lady Rachel Pepys; Bernard Fitzalan-Howard, 16th Duke of Norfolk; Lady Katherine Mary Fitzalan-Howard; Lady Winifred Alice Fitzalan-Howard
- Parents: Marmaduke Constable-Maxwell, 11th Lord Herries of Terregles (father); Angela Fitzalan-Howard (mother)

Gwendolen Mary Fitzalan-Howard, Duchess of Norfolk, 12th Lady Herries of Terregles (née Constable-Maxwell; 11 January 1877 – 28 August 1945) was a British noblewoman and hereditary peer.

== Early life ==
Gwendolen Constable-Maxwell was born in 1877, the eldest child of Marmaduke Constable-Maxwell, 11th Lord Herries of Terregles and his wife, Angela (née Fitzalan-Howard).

== Marriage and children ==
On 15 February 1904, she married as his second wife her first cousin once removed, Henry Fitzalan-Howard, 15th Duke of Norfolk. The couple had four children:

- Lady (Mary) Rachel Fitzalan-Howard (27 June 1905 - 17 August 1992)
- Bernard Marmaduke Fitzalan-Howard, 16th Duke of Norfolk (30 May 1908 - 30 January 1975)
- Lady Katherine Mary Fitzalan-Howard (25 March 1912 - April 2000)
- Lady Winifred Alice Fitzalan-Howard (31 October 1914 - 27 May 2006)

The 15th Duke of Norfolk died in 1917.

== Peerage ==
Upon the death of her father in 1908, she, in the absence of sons and as the elder daughter, inherited the Lordship Herries of Terregles and became 12th Lady Herries of Terregles.

== Death ==
She died at her home Kinharvie House near New Abbey in 1945 at the age of 68. A Requiem Mass was said at St Mary's in New Abbey before interment in the Norfolk burial vault at Arundel Castle in Sussex.

Her son Bernard, having succeeded as 16th Duke of Norfolk upon his father's death in 1917, additionally succeeded her as 13th Lord Herries of Terregles.

Peerage of Scotland
Preceded by Marmaduke Constable-Maxwell	Lady Herries of Terregles; 1908–1945	Succeeded by Bernard Fitzalan-Howard
