= By-elections to the House of Lords =

Elections in the United Kingdom

A number of by-elections to the House of Lords occurred between the passage of the House of Lords Act 1999 and the coming into effect of the House of Lords (Hereditary Peers) Act 2026.

They occurred when vacancies arose among seats assigned to hereditary peers due to death, resignation, or disqualification. Candidates for these by-elections were limited to holders of hereditary peerages, and their electorates were made up of sitting Lords; in most cases the electorate were those sitting hereditary peers of the same party affiliation as the departed peer. Following the enactment of the House of Lords Act 1999, the number of hereditary peers entitled to sit in the House of Lords was reduced to ninety-two. The Earl Marshal and the Lord Great Chamberlain were entitled to sit ex officio; the remaining ninety were elected by all the hereditary peers before the passing of the reform.

Before the passing of the 1999 Act, the Lords approved a Standing Order stating that the remaining hereditary peers shall consist of:

- 2 peers to be elected by the Labour hereditary peers
- 42 peers to be elected by the Conservative hereditary peers
- 3 peers to be elected by the Liberal Democrat hereditary peers
- 28 peers to be elected by the Crossbench hereditary peers
- 15 peers to be elected by the whole House
  - By convention, whole-House elections elect members of the same affiliation as the departed peer.
- The holders of the offices of Earl Marshal and Lord Great Chamberlain to be ex officio members.
  - The current holder of the office of Lord Great Chamberlain was previously elected to the House of Lords in a by-election.

Prior to November 2002, vacancies were automatically filled by the highest performing unsuccessful candidate in the 1999 House of Lords election that elected the departed peer.

Elections were normally required to be held within three months of a vacancy occurring, but until the end of 2024–2026 parliamentary session, elections must be held within 36 months—in practice suspending by-elections whilst the role of hereditary peers in the Lords was debated (see House of Lords (Hereditary Peers) Act 2026).

The elections took place under the Alternative Vote system for elections to individual vacancies and the Single Transferrable Vote for elections to fill multiple vacancies. All those on the Register of Hereditary Peers were eligible to stand, but only sitting (the "excepted") hereditary peers of the group in question could vote for the seats reserved for a single parliamentary group. This could result in very small electorates, such as only three voters in the 2003 election of Lord Grantchester. For the 15 peers elected by the whole House, life peers could also vote.

There were 18 by-elections among Conservative peers; 19 by-elections among Crossbench peers; 2 among Liberal Democrat peers; and 2 among Labour peers. In addition, there have been 14 by-elections by the whole House.

== List of by-elections ==
=== Whole House ===
==== 2000s ====
After the death of the Viscount of Oxfuird

Hereditary peers' by-election (whole House eligible to vote), March 2003
Party	Candidate	Count 1	Count 2	Count 3	Count 4	Count 5	Count 6	Count 7	Count 8	Count 9	Count 10	Count 11	Count 12	Count 13	Count 14	Count 15	Count 16	Count 17	Count 18
Conservative	✓ Viscount Ullswater	86	89	89	91	91	94	95	101	103	109	111	114	116	123	123	127	144	151
Crossbench	Viscount Montgomery of Alamein	46	46	46	46	48	49	49	53	54	56	56	61	63	66	68	80	95	116
Labour	Lord Grantchester	57	58	59	59	59	59	59	59	60	60	61	62	64	65	83	92	93	-
Conservative	Viscount Eccles	31	32	33	34	35	37	37	41	43	44	46	47	48	53	53	55	-	-
Crossbench	Lord Meston	39	40	40	42	42	44	44	44	45	45	45	45	48	48	48	-	-	-
Labour	Lord Monkswell	26	26	27	27	27	27	28	28	28	28	29	29	31	31	-	-	-	-
Crossbench	Earl of Clancarty (Note: Eligible to stand by virtue of his junior title, Viscount Clancarty, as his senior title is in the Peerage of Ireland)	10	12	12	12	12	13	14	16	17	17	17	-	-	-	-	-	-	-
Crossbench	Lord Rathcavan	13	13	13	13	13	13	14	14	14	14	14	-	-	-	-	-	-	-
Conservative	Viscount Trenchard	10	11	11	12	12	12	12	12	13	13	-	-	-	-	-	-	-	-
Conservative	Viscount Weir	10	11	11	12	12	12	12	12	13	13	-	-	-	-	-	-	-	-
Conservative	Earl Cathcart	9	10	10	10	10	11	11	12	12	-	-	-	-	-	-	-	-	-
Conservative	Lord Norrie	8	8	8	10	10	11	11	11	-	-	-	-	-	-	-	-	-	-
Conservative	Viscount Brentford	8	8	8	9	9	9	9	-	-	-	-	-	-	-	-	-	-	-
Conservative	Earl of Cranbrook	5	7	7	8	8	9	9	-	-	-	-	-	-	-	-	-	-	-
Conservative	Earl of Stockton	6	6	7	8	9	9	9	-	-	-	-	-	-	-	-	-	-	-
Crossbench	Earl of Effingham	6	6	6	6	6	6	-	-	-	-	-	-	-	-	-	-	-	-
Crossbench	Earl of Iveagh	5	5	5	5	5	-	-	-	-	-	-	-	-	-	-	-	-	-
Conservative	Lord de Ramsey	4	4	5	5	5	-	-	-	-	-	-	-	-	-	-	-	-	-
Liberal Democrats	Earl of Carlisle	3	4	4	5	5	-	-	-	-	-	-	-	-	-	-	-	-	-
Crossbench	Earl Cairns	4	4	4	4	-	-	-	-	-	-	-	-	-	-	-	-	-	-
Conservative	Viscount Addison	3	3	3	-	-	-	-	-	-	-	-	-	-	-	-	-	-	-
Conservative	Lord Birdwood	3	3	3	-	-	-	-	-	-	-	-	-	-	-	-	-	-	-
Liberal Democrats	Earl of Glasgow	3	3	3	-	-	-	-	-	-	-	-	-	-	-	-	-	-	-
Conservative	Lord Vaux of Harrowden	3	3	3	-	-	-	-	-	-	-	-	-	-	-	-	-	-	-
Conservative	Earl of Kinnoull	2	3	3	-	-	-	-	-	-	-	-	-	-	-	-	-	-	-
Conservative	Lord de Mauley	2	2	-	-	-	-	-	-	-	-	-	-	-	-	-	-	-	-
Conservative	Lord Gray	2	2	-	-	-	-	-	-	-	-	-	-	-	-	-	-	-	-
Conservative	Viscount Hood	2	2	-	-	-	-	-	-	-	-	-	-	-	-	-	-	-	-
Independent	Lord Kennet	2	2	-	-	-	-	-	-	-	-	-	-	-	-	-	-	-	-
Conservative	Viscount Torrington	1	-	-	-	-	-	-	-	-	-	-	-	-	-	-	-	-	-
Conservative	Lord Teynham	1	-	-	-	-	-	-	-	-	-	-	-	-	-	-	-	-	-
Conservative	Earl of Swinton	1	-	-	-	-	-	-	-	-	-	-	-	-	-	-	-	-	-
Conservative	Lord Strathcarron	1	-	-	-	-	-	-	-	-	-	-	-	-	-	-	-	-	-
Conservative	Lord Rowallan	1	-	-	-	-	-	-	-	-	-	-	-	-	-	-	-	-	-
Conservative	Lord Poole	1	-	-	-	-	-	-	-	-	-	-	-	-	-	-	-	-	-
Conservative	Lord Pender	1	-	-	-	-	-	-	-	-	-	-	-	-	-	-	-	-	-
Crossbench	Lord Napier of Magdala	1	-	-	-	-	-	-	-	-	-	-	-	-	-	-	-	-	-
Conservative	Lord Morris	1	-	-	-	-	-	-	-	-	-	-	-	-	-	-	-	-	-
Crossbench	Lord Lawrence	1	-	-	-	-	-	-	-	-	-	-	-	-	-	-	-	-	-
Crossbench	Earl of Kintore	1	-	-	-	-	-	-	-	-	-	-	-	-	-	-	-	-	-
Crossbench	Lord Gladwyn	1	-	-	-	-	-	-	-	-	-	-	-	-	-	-	-	-	-
Crossbench	Earl of Cromer	1	-	-	-	-	-	-	-	-	-	-	-	-	-	-	-	-	-
Crossbench	Lord Birkett	1	-	-	-	-	-	-	-	-	-	-	-	-	-	-	-	-	-
Independent	Lord Ashbourne	1	-	-	-	-	-	-	-	-	-	-	-	-	-	-	-	-	-
Others	37 others (Note: Lord Biddulph, Lord Cadman, Lord Calverley, Lord Carew, Lord Chesham, Lord Clifford of Chudleigh, Earl Cowley, Lord Cromwell, Earl of Drogheda (eligible to stand by virtue of his junior title, Baron Moore, as his senior title is in the Peerage of Ireland), Earl of Enniskillen (eligible to stand by virtue of his junior title, Baron Grinstead, as his senior title is in the Peerage of Ireland), Viscount Gage (eligible to stand by virtue of his junior title, Baron Gage, as his senior title is in the Peerage of Ireland), Lord Gainford, Lord Glanusk, Lord Herbert, Lord Hindlip, Lord HolmPatrick, Lord Kenilworth, Lord Killearn, Earl of Kimberley, Earl of Lauderdale, Viscount Leathers, Lord Macpherson of Drumochter, Viscount Massereene and Ferrard (eligible to stand by virtue of his junior title, Baron Oriel, as his senior title is in the Peerage of Ireland), Viscount Melville, Lord Milford, Lord Milverton, Lord Monk Bretton, Lord Newall, Lord Oranmore and Browne (eligible to stand by virtue of his junior title, Baron Mereworth, as his senior title is in the Peerage of Ireland), Lord Renwick, Viscount Samuel, Lord Sempill, Earl of Shannon (eligible to stand by virtue of his junior title, Baron Carleton, as his senior title is in the Peerage of Ireland), Duke of Somerset, Lord Sudeley, Lord Terrington, and Lord Tryon)	0	-	-	-	-	-	-	-	-	-	-	-	-	-	-	-	-	-
Electorate: 661 Valid: 423 Spoilt: 3 Quota: 212 Turnout: 426

After the death of Lord Aberdare:

Hereditary peers' by-election (whole House eligible to vote), March 2005
Party	Candidate	Count 1	Count 2	Count 3	Count 4	Count 5	Count 6	Count 7	Count 8	Count 9	Count 10	Count 11	Count 12	Count 13	Count 14	Count 15	Count 16	Count 17	Count 18	Count 19	Count 20	Count 21	Count 22	Count 23	Count 24
Conservative	✓ Viscount Eccles	92	92	92	92	93	93	93	93	93	93	93	93	94	94	96	96	98	102	104	111	119	129	146	168
Labour	Lord Monkswell	63	63	63	63	63	63	63	63	63	63	64	64	64	64	64	64	64	64	64	64	64	65	65	67
Liberal Democrats	Earl of Carlisle	49	49	50	50	50	50	50	50	50	50	50	50	50	51	51	51	51	51	53	54	54	55	59	61
Conservative	Earl Cathcart	32	32	32	32	32	32	33	33	33	33	33	33	33	33	33	34	35	36	36	38	40	41	44	-
Conservative	Earl of Stockton	22	22	22	22	22	23	23	23	24	24	24	25	25	25	25	26	27	27	31	34	35	39	-	-
Conservative	Lord Norrie	19	19	19	19	19	19	19	20	20	21	22	22	22	22	22	22	25	27	27	28	31	-	-	-
Conservative	Viscount Torrington	10	10	10	10	10	10	10	10	10	10	10	10	11	13	14	14	14	14	14	14	-	-	-	-
Conservative	Lord de Ramsey	11	11	11	11	11	11	11	11	11	11	11	11	11	11	12	12	12	13	14	-	-	-	-	-
Crossbench	Lord Birkett	9	9	9	9	9	9	9	9	9	9	9	9	9	9	9	10	10	12	-	-	-	-	-	-
Conservative	Lord Rathcavan	9	9	9	9	9	9	9	9	9	9	9	9	9	9	9	9	10	-	-	-	-	-	-	-
Conservative	Viscount Weir	7	7	7	7	7	7	7	7	7	8	8	8	8	8	8	8	-	-	-	-	-	-	-	-
Conservative	Lord Poole	3	4	4	4	4	4	4	4	4	4	4	4	4	4	4	-	-	-	-	-	-	-	-	-
Conservative	Viscount Hood	4	4	4	4	4	4	4	4	4	4	4	4	4	4	-	-	-	-	-	-	-	-	-	-
Conservative	Lord Margadale	3	3	3	3	3	3	3	3	3	3	3	3	3	-	-	-	-	-	-	-	-	-	-	-
Conservative	Lord Terrington	1	1	1	2	2	2	2	2	2	2	2	2	-	-	-	-	-	-	-	-	-	-	-	-
Crossbench	Lord Tryon	2	2	2	2	2	2	2	2	2	2	2	-	-	-	-	-	-	-	-	-	-	-	-	-
UKIP	Duke of Rutland	2	2	2	2	2	2	2	2	2	2	-	-	-	-	-	-	-	-	-	-	-	-	-	-
Conservative	Viscount Addison	2	2	2	2	2	2	2	2	2	-	-	-	-	-	-	-	-	-	-	-	-	-	-	-
Conservative	Lord Vivian	1	1	1	1	1	1	1	1	-	-	-	-	-	-	-	-	-	-	-	-	-	-	-	-
Conservative	Lord Rowallan	1	1	1	1	1	1	1	-	-	-	-	-	-	-	-	-	-	-	-	-	-	-	-	-
Conservative	Viscount Massereene and Ferrard (Note: Eligible to stand by virtue of his junior title, Baron Oriel, as his senior title is in the Peerage of Ireland)	1	1	1	1	1	1	-	-	-	-	-	-	-	-	-	-	-	-	-	-	-	-	-	-
Conservative	Earl of Kinnoull	1	1	1	1	1	-	-	-	-	-	-	-	-	-	-	-	-	-	-	-	-	-	-	-
Conservative	Lord Killearn	1	1	1	1	-	-	-	-	-	-	-	-	-	-	-	-	-	-	-	-	-	-	-	-
Crossbench	Lord Glanusk	1	1	1	-	-	-	-	-	-	-	-	-	-	-	-	-	-	-	-	-	-	-	-	-
Crossbench	Lord Clifford of Chudleigh	1	1	-	-	-	-	-	-	-	-	-	-	-	-	-	-	-	-	-	-	-	-	-	-
Conservative	Earl Alexander of Tunis	1	-	-	-	-	-	-	-	-	-	-	-	-	-	-	-	-	-	-	-	-	-	-	-
Others	10 others (Note: Lord Biddulph, Lord Birdwood, Lord Cadman, Lord Gainford, Lord Harlech, Earl of Kimberley, Lord Milverton, Lord Morris, Lord Newall, and Lord Sudeley)	0	-	-	-	-	-	-	-	-	-	-	-	-	-	-	-	-	-	-	-	-	-	-	-
Electorate: 687 Valid: 348 Spoilt: 4 Quota: 174 Turnout: 352

==== 2010s ====
After the death of the Lord Strabolgi:

Hereditary peers' by-election (whole House eligible to vote), March 2011
Party	Candidate	Count 1
Labour	✓ Viscount Hanworth	233
Liberal Democrats	Earl of Carlisle	26
Conservative	Lord de Ramsey	24
Crossbench	Lord Hacking	24
Labour	Lord Monkswell	21
Conservative	Earl of Stockton	20
Conservative	Earl of Harrowby	17
Crossbench	Lord Cromwell	8
Conservative	Earl of Limerick	7
Conservative	Lord Killearn	6
Conservative	Earl Alexander of Tunis	5
Conservative	Lord Margadale	5
Conservative	Earl of Kinnoull	4
Liberal Democrats	Lord Ogmore	4
Conservative	Lord Rowallan	3
Conservative	Viscount Addison	2
Crossbench	Lord Tryon	2
Conservative	Lord Birdwood	1
Crossbench	Earl of Cromer	1
Conservative	Lord Sudeley	1
Others	4 others (Note: Lord Gainford, Viscount Hill, Lord Parmoor, and Lord Vivian)	0
Electorate: 769 Valid: 414 Spoilt: 2 Quota: 207 Turnout: 416

After the death of the Lord Ampthill:

Hereditary peers' by-election (whole House eligible to vote), July 2011
Party	Candidate	Count 1	Count 2	Count 3	Count 4	Count 5	Count 6	Count 7	Count 8	Count 9	Count 10	Count 11	Count 12	Count 13	Count 14	Count 15
Crossbench	✓ Viscount Colville of Culross	77	77	78	78	78	78	79	79	80	80	81	88	94	101	126
Crossbench	Duke of Somerset	76	76	76	76	76	78	78	78	79	80	81	86	91	98	104
Crossbench	Lord Hacking	52	52	52	52	52	54	54	56	56	57	59	60	66	73	-
Conservative	Earl of Stockton	28	28	29	29	29	29	29	29	30	33	33	33	38	-	-
Liberal Democrats	Lord Kennet	17	17	17	17	17	17	17	18	18	19	26	26	-	-	-
Crossbench	Earl of Shaftesbury	12	13	13	13	13	14	16	16	16	17	18	-	-	-	-
Liberal Democrats	Earl of Carlisle	12	12	13	13	13	13	13	13	13	13	-	-	-	-	-
Conservative	Earl of Limerick (Note: Eligible to stand by virtue of his junior title, Baron Foxford, as his senior title is in the Peerage of Ireland)	6	7	7	7	7	7	7	9	12	-	-	-	-	-	-
Conservative	Lord Margadale	5	6	6	6	7	7	7	8	-	-	-	-	-	-	-
Conservative	Earl of Kinnoull	7	7	7	7	7	7	7	-	-	-	-	-	-	-	-
Conservative	Viscount Hood	5	5	5	6	6	6	-	-	-	-	-	-	-	-	-
Crossbench	Lord Cromwell	4	4	4	4	5	-	-	-	-	-	-	-	-	-	-
Conservative	Lord Killearn	3	3	3	3	-	-	-	-	-	-	-	-	-	-	-
Crossbench	Lord Cadman	3	3	3	-	-	-	-	-	-	-	-	-	-	-	-
Crossbench	Earl of Albemarle	3	3	-	-	-	-	-	-	-	-	-	-	-	-	-
Conservative	Lord Biddulph	1	-	-	-	-	-	-	-	-	-	-	-	-	-	-
Conservative	Lord Tryon	1	-	-	-	-	-	-	-	-	-	-	-	-	-	-
Conservative	Lord Vivian	1	-	-	-	-	-	-	-	-	-	-	-	-	-	-
Others	2 others (Note: Lord Napier of Magdala and Lord Rowallan)	0	-	-	-	-	-	-	-	-	-	-	-	-	-	-
Electorate: 769 Valid: 313 Spoilt: 3 Quota: 157 Turnout: 316

After the death of the Lord Reay:

Hereditary peers' by-election (whole House eligible to vote), July 2013
Party	Candidate	Count 1	Count 2	Count 3	Count 4	Count 5	Count 6	Count 7	Count 8	Count 9	Count 10	Count 11	Count 12	Count 13	Count 14	Count 15	Count 16	Count 17
Conservative	✓ Lord Borwick	104	105	105	106	106	107	109	109	109	110	112	113	114	117	120	135	160
Conservative	Viscount Hailsham (Note: Created Baron Hailsham of Kettlethorpe for Life in 2015)	104	104	105	105	106	106	106	106	106	106	107	107	108	112	113	117	129
Conservative	Earl of Stockton	34	34	34	34	34	34	34	34	36	38	39	41	42	44	56	61	-
Conservative	Earl of Harrowby	23	23	23	23	23	23	23	23	24	24	26	26	27	29	31	-	-
Liberal Democrats	Lord Kennet	17	17	17	17	17	19	19	19	19	19	19	20	20	20	-	-	-
Conservative	Lord Swansea	8	9	9	9	9	9	9	9	9	9	10	11	13	-	-	-	-
Conservative	Lord Ampthill	6	6	7	7	8	8	8	9	10	10	10	10	-	-	-	-	-
Crossbench	Lord Napier and Ettrick	6	6	6	7	8	8	8	8	8	8	8	-	-	-	-	-	-
Conservative	Lord Margadale	6	6	6	6	6	6	6	7	7	7	-	-	-	-	-	-	-
Conservative	Lord Windlesham	4	4	4	4	4	4	4	4	4	-	-	-	-	-	-	-	-
Conservative	Lord Rowallan	4	4	4	4	4	4	4	4	-	-	-	-	-	-	-	-	-
Conservative	Earl of Onslow	3	3	3	3	3	3	3	-	-	-	-	-	-	-	-	-	-
UKIP	Viscount Massereene and Ferrard (Note: Eligible to stand by virtue of his junior title, Baron Oriel, as his senior title is in the Peerage of Ireland)	3	3	3	3	3	3	-	-	-	-	-	-	-	-	-	-	-
Liberal Democrats	Earl of Carlisle	3	3	3	3	3	-	-	-	-	-	-	-	-	-	-	-	-
Crossbench	Earl of Albemarle	3	3	3	3	-	-	-	-	-	-	-	-	-	-	-	-	-
Crossbench	Lord Hemphill	2	2	2	-	-	-	-	-	-	-	-	-	-	-	-	-	-
Conservative	Lord Biddulph	2	2	-	-	-	-	-	-	-	-	-	-	-	-	-	-	-
Conservative	Lord Cadman	1	-	-	-	-	-	-	-	-	-	-	-	-	-	-	-	-
Conservative	Lord Harlech	1	-	-	-	-	-	-	-	-	-	-	-	-	-	-	-	-
Others	4 others (Note: Lord Fisher, Lord Morris, Lord Ogmore, and Lord Sudeley)	0	-	-	-	-	-	-	-	-	-	-	-	-	-	-	-	-
Electorate: 753 Valid: 334 Spoilt: 2 Quota: 167 Turnout: 336

After the death of the Lord Methuen:

Hereditary peers' by-election (whole House eligible to vote), October 2014
Party	Candidate	Count 1
Liberal Democrats	✓ Earl of Oxford and Asquith	155
Crossbench	Lord Napier and Ettrick	35
Conservative	Earl of Stockton	31
Liberal Democrats	Lord Kennet	29
Conservative	Lord Margadale	13
Crossbench	Viscount Massereene and Ferrard (Note: Eligible to stand by virtue of his junior title, Baron Oriel, as his senior title is in the Peerage of Ireland)	6
Crossbench	Lord Somerleyton	6
Conservative	Lord Harlech	4
Crossbench	Lord Calverley	1
Conservative	Lord Layton	1
Conservative	Lord Middleton	1
Conservative	Lord Sudeley	1
Others	3 others (Note: Lord Biddulph, Lord Cadman, and Lord Rowallan)	0
Electorate: 776 Valid: 283 Spoilt: 0 Quota: 142 Turnout: 283

After the death of the Lord Lyell:

Hereditary peers' by-election (whole House eligible to vote), March 2017
Party	Candidate	Count 1	Count 2	Count 3	Count 4	Count 5	Count 6	Count 7	Count 8	Count 9	Count 10	Count 11	Count 12	Count 13	Count 14	Count 15	Count 16	Count 17	Count 18	Count 19	Count 20	Count 21	Count 22	Count 23	Count 24	Count 25
Conservative	✓ Lord Colgrain	104	104	104	104	104	104	104	105	105	105	108	108	108	109	109	109	111	111	113	115	118	118	126	137	143
Conservative	Lord Bethell	54	54	54	55	55	56	56	56	56	56	56	56	56	57	59	60	62	62	64	68	70	76	82	90	108
Conservative	Earl of Stockton	34	34	34	34	34	34	35	35	37	38	38	39	39	41	41	42	43	44	45	46	49	58	59	62	-
Conservative	Marquess of Abergavenny	27	27	27	27	27	28	28	28	28	28	28	28	28	28	29	29	30	31	32	35	36	37	38	-	-
Conservative	Earl of Harrowby	15	15	15	15	15	15	15	15	15	15	15	15	16	16	16	16	17	17	19	20	23	23	-	-	-
Liberal Democrats	Earl Lloyd-George of Dwyfor	12	12	12	12	12	12	12	12	12	13	13	14	14	14	14	14	15	23	23	23	23	-	-	-	-
Conservative	Lord Windlesham	14	14	14	14	14	14	14	15	15	15	15	15	16	16	16	16	17	17	17	18	-	-	-	-	-
Conservative	Lord Napier and Ettrick	14	14	14	14	14	14	14	14	14	15	15	15	15	16	16	16	16	16	16	-	-	-	-	-	-
Crossbench	Lord Darling	9	9	10	10	10	10	10	10	10	10	10	10	10	10	11	14	14	14	-	-	-	-	-	-	-
Liberal Democrats	Lord Kennet	9	10	10	10	10	10	10	10	10	10	10	12	12	12	13	14	14	-	-	-	-	-	-	-	-
Conservative	Lord Strathcarron	8	8	8	8	8	8	8	8	8	8	9	9	9	9	9	9	-	-	-	-	-	-	-	-	-
Crossbench	Viscount Powerscourt (Note: Eligible to stand by virtue of his junior title, Baron Powerscourt, as his senior title is in the Peerage of Ireland)	6	6	6	6	6	6	7	7	7	7	7	7	7	7	7	-	-	-	-	-	-	-	-	-	-
Crossbench	Lord Mostyn	6	6	6	6	6	6	6	6	6	6	6	6	7	7	-	-	-	-	-	-	-	-	-	-	-
Conservative	Earl of Limerick (Note: Eligible to stand by virtue of his junior title, Baron Foxford, as his senior title is in the Peerage of Ireland)	5	5	5	5	5	5	5	5	5	5	5	5	5	-	-	-	-	-	-	-	-	-	-	-	-
Conservative	Lord Swansea	4	4	4	4	5	5	5	5	5	5	5	5	-	-	-	-	-	-	-	-	-	-	-	-	-
Liberal Democrats	Lord Harlech	4	4	4	4	4	4	4	4	4	4	4	-	-	-	-	-	-	-	-	-	-	-	-	-	-
Conservative	Lord Macpherson of Drumochter	4	4	4	4	4	4	4	4	4	4	-	-	-	-	-	-	-	-	-	-	-	-	-	-	-
Conservative	Earl Alexander of Tunis	3	3	3	3	3	3	3	3	3	-	-	-	-	-	-	-	-	-	-	-	-	-	-	-	-
Crossbench	Viscount Hood	2	2	2	2	2	2	2	2	-	-	-	-	-	-	-	-	-	-	-	-	-	-	-	-	-
Conservative	Viscount Addison	2	2	2	2	2	2	2	-	-	-	-	-	-	-	-	-	-	-	-	-	-	-	-	-	-
Conservative	Viscount Mountgarret (Note: Eligible to stand by virtue of his junior title, Baron Mountgarret, as his senior title is in the Peerage of Ireland)	2	2	2	2	2	2	-	-	-	-	-	-	-	-	-	-	-	-	-	-	-	-	-	-	-
Conservative	Lord Biddulph	2	2	2	2	2	-	-	-	-	-	-	-	-	-	-	-	-	-	-	-	-	-	-	-	-
Independent	Lord Gainford	2	2	2	2	-	-	-	-	-	-	-	-	-	-	-	-	-	-	-	-	-	-	-	-	-
Crossbench	Lord Hampton	2	2	2	-	-	-	-	-	-	-	-	-	-	-	-	-	-	-	-	-	-	-	-	-	-
Crossbench	Lord Somerleyton	1	1	-	-	-	-	-	-	-	-	-	-	-	-	-	-	-	-	-	-	-	-	-	-	-
Crossbench	Lord Hankey	1	-	-	-	-	-	-	-	-	-	-	-	-	-	-	-	-	-	-	-	-	-	-	-	-
Conservative	Lord Cadman	0	-	-	-	-	-	-	-	-	-	-	-	-	-	-	-	-	-	-	-	-	-	-	-	-
Electorate: 803 Valid: 346 Spoilt: 0 Quota: 173 Turnout: 346

After the death of the Lord Skelmersdale:

Hereditary peers' by-election (whole House eligible to vote), January 2019
Party	Candidate	Count 1	Count 2	Count 3	Count 4	Count 5	Count 6	Count 7	Count 8	Count 9	Count 10	Count 11
Conservative	✓ Lord Reay	73	73	73	73	74	78	78	81	87	94	110
Conservative	Earl of Leicester	46	46	46	46	47	52	53	58	62	74	93
Conservative	Lord Strathcarron	32	32	32	33	37	39	39	41	44	49	-
Conservative	Lord Napier and Ettrick	24	24	24	24	25	28	32	36	39	-	-
Conservative	Earl of Carnarvon	20	20	20	22	23	24	24	25	-	-	-
Conservative	Earl of Stockton	18	18	18	18	19	19	21	-	-	-	-
Crossbench	Lord Hampton	10	11	15	16	17	17	-	-	-	-	-
Conservative	Lord Ashcombe	13	13	13	13	15	-	-	-	-	-	-
Conservative	Lord Windlesham	12	12	12	12	-	-	-	-	-	-	-
Crossbench	Earl of Effingham	5	5	5	-	-	-	-	-	-	-	-
Crossbench	Viscount Powerscourt (Note: Eligible to stand by virtue of his junior title, Baron Powerscourt, as his senior title is in the Peerage of Ireland)	4	5	-	-	-	-	-	-	-	-	-
Conservative	Viscount Mountgarret (Note: Eligible to stand by virtue of his junior title, Baron Mountgarret, as his senior title is in the Peerage of Ireland)	1	-	-	-	-	-	-	-	-	-	-
Crossbench	Lord Oranmore and Browne (Note: Eligible to stand by virtue of his junior title, Baron Mereworth, as his senior title is in the Peerage of Ireland)	1	-	-	-	-	-	-	-	-	-	-
Others	3 others (Note: Lord Biddulph, Lord Cadman, and Lord Southampton)	0	-	-	-	-	-	-	-	-	-	-
Electorate: 785 Valid: 259 Spoilt: 0 Quota: 130 Turnout: 259 (33%)

==== 2020s ====
After the retirement of the Countess of Mar:

Hereditary peers' by-election (whole House eligible to vote), June 2021
Party	Candidate	Count 1	Count 2	Count 3	Count 4	Count 5	Count 6	Count 7
Crossbench	✓ Lord Londesborough	114	116	116	116	121	129	147
Crossbench	Lord Meston	66	66	66	67	70	75	80
Crossbench	Lord Chorley	32	33	34	35	37	46	50
Crossbench	Lord de Clifford	27	30	32	34	35	38	-
Crossbench	Lord Hampton	31	31	31	32	34	-	-
Crossbench	Lord Somerleyton	18	19	20	20	-	-	-
Crossbench	Earl of Albemarle	13	13	14	-	-	-	-
Crossbench	Lord Birkett	8	8	-	-	-	-	-
Crossbench	Lord Milverton	6	-	-	-	-	-	-
Crossbench	Earl of Effingham	2	-	-	-	-	-	-
Electorate: 786 Valid: 317 Spoilt: 0 Quota: 159 Turnout: 317

After the retirement of the Lord Elton:

Hereditary peers' by-election (whole House eligible to vote), July 2021
Party	Candidate	Count 1	Count 2	Count 3	Count 4	Count 5	Count 6	Count 7	Count 8	Count 9	Count 10	Count 11
Conservative	✓ Lord Harlech	67	67	67	68	69	70	71	73	77	84	100
Conservative	Lord Strathcarron	46	47	47	47	47	49	49	50	51	61	69
Conservative	Earl of Stockton	31	31	31	32	33	37	38	41	47	59	-
Conservative	Earl of Carnarvon	13	14	14	14	17	17	18	21	24	-	-
Conservative	Earl De La Warr	15	15	15	15	15	15	19	22	22	-	-
Conservative	Earl of Limerick (Note: Eligible to stand by virtue of his junior title, Baron Foxford, as his senior title is in the Peerage of Ireland)	12	12	13	13	14	15	18	19	-	-	-
Conservative	Lord Margadale	14	14	15	15	15	15	17	-	-	-	-
Conservative	Lord de Ramsey	11	11	11	11	12	14	-	-	-	-	-
Conservative	Lord Windlesham	10	10	10	11	12	-	-	-	-	-	-
Conservative	Lord Napier and Ettrick	7	7	8	9	-	-	-	-	-	-	-
Conservative	Lord Dormer	5	5	5	-	-	-	-	-	-	-	-
Conservative	Lord Elibank	4	4	-	-	-	-	-	-	-	-	-
Conservative	Viscount Mountgarret (Note: Eligible to stand by virtue of his junior title, Baron Mountgarret, as his senior title is in the Peerage of Ireland)	2	-	-	-	-	-	-	-	-	-	-
Electorate: over 750 Valid: 237 Spoilt: 0 Quota: 119 Turnout: 237

After the death of the Viscount Simon:

Hereditary peers' by-election (whole House eligible to vote), November 2021
Party	Candidate	Count 1
Labour	✓ Lord Hacking	159
Labour	Lord Kennet	82
Conservative	Lord Biddulph	23
Electorate: 783 Valid: 264 Spoilt: 0 Quota: 132 Turnout: 264

After the retirements of the Viscount Ullswater, and the Lord Colwyn:

Hereditary peers' by-election (whole House eligible to vote), October 2022
Party	Candidate	Count 1	Count 2	Count 3	Count 4	Count 5	Count 6	Count 7	Count 8	Count 9	Count 10	Count 11	Count 12	Count 13	Count 14	Count 15	Count 16	Count 17
Conservative	✓ Lord Roborough	36	36	36	36	36	36	36	36	36	37	37	38	38	39	45	46	58
Conservative	✓ Earl of Minto	31	31	31	31	31	31	31	31	31	31	32	34	35	38	42	44	51
Conservative	Lord Hazlerigg	21	21	21	22	22	22	22	22	23	24	24	24	25	27	29	32	36
Conservative	Lord Ashcombe	18	18	18	18	18	19	19	19	21	21	21	21	21	22	26	28	-
Conservative	Lord Windlesham	13	13	13	13	13	14	14	14	14	15	17	18	21	22	22	-	-
Conservative	Earl of Effingham	13	13	13	13	14	14	14	14	15	16	16	17	18	21	-	-	-
Conservative	Lord Rossmore	13	13	13	14	14	14	14	14	14	15	16	16	17	-	-	-	-
Conservative	Lord Baillieu	7	7	8	8	8	9	9	9	9	10	10	12	-	-	-	-	-
Conservative	Earl of Balfour	8	8	8	8	8	8	8	8	8	8	8	-	-	-	-	-	-
Conservative	Earl of Limerick (Note: Eligible to stand by virtue of his junior title, Baron Foxford, as his senior title is in the Peerage of Ireland)	6	6	6	6	6	6	7	7	7	7	-	-	-	-	-	-	-
Conservative	Marquess of Bristol	6	6	6	6	6	6	7	7	7	-	-	-	-	-	-	-	-
Conservative	Marquess of Abergavenny	4	4	4	4	4	5	5	5	-	-	-	-	-	-	-	-	-
Independent	Earl of Dudley	4	4	4	4	4	4	4	-	-	-	-	-	-	-	-	-	-
Conservative	Lord Ashbourne	3	3	3	3	3	3	-	-	-	-	-	-	-	-	-	-	-
Conservative	Lord Rowallan	2	2	2	2	3	-	-	-	-	-	-	-	-	-	-	-	-
Conservative	Lord Napier and Ettrick	2	2	2	2	-	-	-	-	-	-	-	-	-	-	-	-	-
Conservative	Lord Dormer	1	1	1	-	-	-	-	-	-	-	-	-	-	-	-	-	-
Conservative	Lord Ironside	1	1	1	-	-	-	-	-	-	-	-	-	-	-	-	-	-
Conservative	Lord Elibank	1	1	-	-	-	-	-	-	-	-	-	-	-	-	-	-	-
Others	2 others (Note: Earl of Eglinton and Winton and Lord Glendyne)	0	-	-	-	-	-	-	-	-	-	-						
Electorate: 757 Valid: 190 Spoilt: 0 Quota: 48.3 Turnout: 190

After the retirement of the Viscount Falkland:

Hereditary peers' by-election (whole House eligible to vote), June 2023
Party	Candidate	Count 1
Liberal Democrats	✓ Earl Russell	123
Liberal Democrats	Earl Lloyd-George of Dwyfor	55
Liberal Democrats	Lord Belhaven and Stenton	34
Electorate: over 750 Valid: 212 Spoilt: 0 Quota: 106 Turnout: 212

After the death of the Lord Brougham and Vaux:

Hereditary peers' by-election (whole House eligible to vote), November 2023
Party	Candidate	Count 1	Count 2	Count 3	Count 4	Count 5	Count 6	Count 7	Count 8	Count 9
Conservative	✓ Lord Camoys	97	97	97	97	99	102	104	117	133
Conservative	Marquess of Bristol	39	39	39	40	40	41	42	46	52
Conservative	Lord Hamilton of Dalzell	34	34	34	35	35	37	37	45	51
Conservative	Lord Rossmore	37	37	37	37	38	38	38	43	-
Conservative	Lord Hazlerigg	13	13	13	14	14	15	16	-	-
Conservative	Earl of Eglinton and Winton	8	8	9	9	9	9	10	-	-
Conservative	Lord Annaly	7	7	7	7	7	7	8	-	-
Conservative	Lord Baillieu	6	7	7	7	7	7	-	-	-
Conservative	Viscount Falmouth	6	6	6	6	7	-	-	-	-
Conservative	Lord Windlesham	4	4	5	5	-	-	-	-	-
Conservative	Viscount Mountgarret (Note: Eligible to stand by virtue of his junior title, Baron Mountgarret, as his senior title is in the Peerage of Ireland)	3	3	3	-	-	-	-	-	-
Conservative	Lord Ashbourne	3	3	-	-	-	-	-	-	-
Conservative	Lord Elibank	1	-	-	-	-	-	-	-	-
Conservative	Lord Napier and Ettrick	1	-	-	-	-	-	-	-	-
Electorate: over 750 Valid: 259 Spoilt: 0 Quota: 130 Turnout: 259

=== Crossbench ===
==== 2000s ====
After the death of Baroness Strange:

Crossbench hereditary peers' by-election, June 2005
Candidate	Count 1	Count 2	Count 3	Count 4	Count 5	Count 6
✓ Viscount Montgomery of Alamein	11	11	11	11	11	11
Earl of Effingham	4	4	5	6	7	8
Earl of Clancarty (Note: Eligible to stand by virtue of his junior title, Viscount Clancarty, as his senior title is in the Peerage of Ireland)	5	5	5	5	6	-
Earl of Stair	3	3	4	4	-	-
Lord Gladwyn	2	3	3	-	-	-
Earl of Iveagh	2	2	-	-	-	-
Lord Milford	1	-	-	-	-	-
19 others (Note: Lord Amherst of Hackney, Lord Birdwood, Lord Birkett, Lord Carew, Lord Clifford of Chudleigh, Earl of Cromer, Lord Cromwell, Earl of Drogheda (eligible to stand by virtue of his junior title, Baron Moore, as his senior title is in the Peerage of Ireland), Lord Glanusk, Earl of Kimberley, Viscount Leathers, Lord Norrie, Lord Oranmore and Browne (eligible to stand by virtue of his junior title, Baron Mereworth, as his senior title is in the Peerage of Ireland), Viscount of Oxfuird, Duke of Rutland, Viscount Samuel, Lord Sudeley, Lord Tryon, and Lord Vernon)	0	-	-	-	-	-
Electorate: 29 Valid: 28 Spoilt: 0 Quota: 14 Turnout: 28

After the death of the Baroness Darcy de Knayth:

Crossbench hereditary peers' by-election, May 2008
Candidate	Count 1	Count 2	Count 3	Count 4	Count 5	Count 6
✓ Earl of Stair	6	6	7	9	11	14
Earl of Clancarty (Note: Eligible to stand by virtue of his junior title, Viscount Clancarty, as his senior title is in the Peerage of Ireland)	7	8	8	9	9	10
Lord Aberdare	4	4	4	4	5	-
Viscount Devonport	3	3	3	3	-	-
Lord Cromwell	2	3	3	-	-	-
Lord Darcy de Knayth	2	2	-	-	-	-
Lord Milford	1	-	-	-	-	-
Lord Terrington	1	-	-	-	-	-
25 others (Note: Earl Alexander of Tunis, Lord Cadman, Lord Carew, Lord Clifford of Chudleigh, Earl of Cromer, Earl of Effingham, Lord Harlech, Viscount Hill, Earl of Iveagh, Earl of Kimberley, Lord Margadale, Viscount Massereene and Ferrard (eligible to stand by virtue of his junior title, Baron Oriel, as his senior title is in the Peerage of Ireland), Viscount Monckton of Brenchley, Lord Napier of Magdala, Lord Oranmore and Browne (eligible to stand by virtue of his junior title, Baron Mereworth, as his senior title is in the Peerage of Ireland), Lord Poole, Lord Revelstoke, Duke of Rutland, Viscount Samuel, Earl of Shaftesbury, Earl of Stockton, Lord Sudeley, Lord Tryon, Lord Vernon, and Lord Wharton)	0	-	-	-	-	-
Electorate: 29 Valid: 26 Spoilt: 0 Quota: 14 Turnout: 26

After the death of the Viscount Bledisloe:

Crossbench hereditary peers' by-election, July 2009
Candidate	Count 1	Count 2	Count 3	Count 4	Count 5
✓ Lord Aberdare	10	12	12	12	13
Lord Sempill	2	3	5	5	5
Viscount Hood	4	4	4	4	4
Earl of Clancarty (Note: Eligible to stand by virtue of his junior title, Viscount Clancarty, as his senior title is in the Peerage of Ireland)	3	3	3	4	-
Lord Hacking	2	3	3	-	-
Duke of Somerset	2	2	-	-	-
Lord Cromwell	1	-	-	-	-
Earl of Effingham	1	-	-	-	-
Lord Polwarth	1	-	-	-	-
Lord Wrenbury	1	-	-	-	-
23 others (Note: Viscount Addison, Earl of Balfour, Lord Birdwood, Lord Cadman, Lord Carew, Lord Clifford of Chudleigh, Earl of Cromer, Viscount Devonport, Lord Gainford, Viscount Hill, Earl of Kimberley, Viscount Leathers, Earl of Lonsdale, Viscount Massereene and Ferrard (eligible to stand by virtue of his junior title, Baron Oriel, as his senior title is in the Peerage of Ireland), Viscount Monckton of Brenchley, Viscount Mountgarret (eligible to stand by virtue of his junior title, Baron Mountgarret, as his senior title is in the Peerage of Ireland), Lord Ogmore, Lord Robertson of Oakridge, Earl of Shaftesbury, Earl of Stockton, Lord Sudeley, Lord Tryon, and Lord Wharton)	0	-	-	-	-
Electorate: 29 Valid: 27 Spoilt: 0 Quota: 13 Turnout: 27

==== 2010s ====
After the death of the Viscount Colville of Culross:

Crossbench hereditary peers' by-election, June 2010
Candidate	Count 1	Count 2	Count 3	Count 4	Count 5
✓ Earl of Clancarty (Note: Eligible to stand by virtue of his junior title, Viscount Clancarty, as his senior title is in the Peerage of Ireland)	10	10	11	12	13
Earl of Lytton	3	5	5	8	8
Viscount Hood	3	4	5	5	-
Lord Sempill	4	4	4	-	-
Viscount Runciman of Doxford	2	3	-	-	-
Earl of Albemarle	1	-	-	-	-
Earl Cairns	1	-	-	-	-
Lord Cromwell	1	-	-	-	-
Lord Hacking	1	-	-	-	-
15 others (Note: Marquess of Abergavenny, Lord Birdwood, Lord Cadman, Earl of Cromer, Lord Darcy de Knayth, Lord Harlech, Viscount Hill, Earl of Kimberley, Viscount Leathers, Viscount Monckton of Brenchley, Lord Ogmore, Earl of Shaftesbury, Lord Sudeley, Lord Tryon, and Viscount Weir)	0	-	-	-	-
Electorate: 29 Valid: 26 Spoilt: 0 Quota: 13 Turnout: 26

After the death of the Lord Monson:

Crossbench hereditary peers' by-election, May 2011
Candidate	Count 1	Count 2	Count 3	Count 4	Count 5
✓ Earl of Lytton	7	7	9	11	15
Duke of Somerset	6	7	9	9	9
Viscount Colville of Culross	6	6	6	7	-
Lord Cromwell	3	3	3	-	-
Earl of Oxford and Asquith	2	2	-	-	-
Earl of Shaftesbury	2	2	-	-	-
Earl of Drogheda (Note: Eligible to stand by virtue of his junior title, Baron Moore, as his senior title is in the Peerage of Ireland)	1	-	-	-	-
7 others (Note: Lord Birdwood, Lord Cadman, Viscount Hill, Earl of Kimberley, Viscount Massereene and Ferrard (eligible to stand by virtue of his junior title, Baron Oriel, as his senior title is in the Peerage of Ireland), Lord Ogmore, and Lord Sudeley)	0	-	-	-	-
Electorate: 28 Valid: 27 Spoilt: 0 Quota: 14 Turnout: 27

After the death of the Lord Moran:

Crossbench hereditary peers' by-election, April 2014
Candidate	Count 1	Count 2	Count 3	Count 4	Count 5
✓ Lord Cromwell	9	10	10	12	13
Lord Russell of Liverpool	7	7	7	9	12
Lord Sempill	4	4	5	5	-
Lord Aldington	4	4	5	-	-
Lord Thurlow	2	2	-	-	-
Lord Napier and Ettrick	1	-	-	-	-
7 others (Note: Earl of Albemarle, Lord Darling, Lord Hacking, Lord Harlech, Viscount Massereene and Ferrard (eligible to stand by virtue of his junior title, Baron Oriel, as his senior title is in the Peerage of Ireland), Lord Monson, and Earl Temple of Stowe)	0	-	-	-	-
Electorate: 29 Valid: 27 Spoilt: 0 Quota: 14 Turnout: 27

After the death of the Viscount Allenby of Megiddo:

Crossbench hereditary peers' by-election, December 2014
Candidate	Count 1	Count 2	Count 3	Count 4	Count 5
✓ Lord Russell of Liverpool	7	8	10	10	13
Duke of Somerset	4	4	4	5	5
Lord Thurlow	4	4	4	5	5
Lord Napier and Ettrick	3	3	3	4	-
Earl of Kinnoull	3	3	3	-	-
Viscount Hood	3	3	-	-	-
Earl of Clanwilliam (Note: Eligible to stand by virtue of his junior title, Baron Clanwilliam, as his senior title is in the Peerage of Ireland)	1	-	-	-	-
11 others (Note: Earl of Albemarle, Lord Aldington, Lord Cadman, Lord Calverley, Lord Darling, Lord Grantley, Lord Harlech, Earl Lloyd-George of Dwyfor, Viscount Massereene and Ferrard (eligible to stand by virtue of his junior title, Baron Oriel, as his senior title is in the Peerage of Ireland), Lord Sempill, and Lord Sudeley)	0	-	-	-	-
Electorate: 27 Valid: 25 Spoilt: 0 Quota: 13 Turnout: 25

After the retirement of the Lord Cobbold:

Crossbench hereditary peers' by-election, December 2014
Candidate	Count 1	Count 2	Count 3	Count 4	Count 5
✓ Duke of Somerset	6	7	8	8	12
Lord Thurlow	8	8	9	10	11
Earl of Kinnoull	4	4	4	5	-
Lord Napier and Ettrick	3	3	3	-	-
Viscount Hood	3	3	-	-	-
Earl of Clanwilliam (Note: Eligible to stand by virtue of his junior title, Baron Clanwilliam, as his senior title is in the Peerage of Ireland)	1	-	-	-	-
11 others (Note: Earl of Albemarle, Lord Aldington, Lord Cadman, Lord Calverley, Lord Darling, Lord Grantley, Lord Harlech, Earl Lloyd-George of Dwyfor, Viscount Massereene and Ferrard (eligible to stand by virtue of his junior title, Baron Oriel, as his senior title is in the Peerage of Ireland), Lord Sempill, and Lord Sudeley)	0	-	-	-	-
Electorate: 27 Valid: 25 Spoilt: 0 Quota: 13 Turnout: 25

After the retirement of the Lord Chorley:

Crossbench hereditary peers' by-election, February 2015
Candidate	Count 1	Count 2	Count 3	Count 4	Count 5	Count 6
✓ Lord Thurlow	8	9	9	9	10	13
Viscount Hood	4	4	4	4	4	4
Lord Napier and Ettrick	3	3	3	3	3	3
Earl of Cork and Orrery (Note: Eligible to stand by virtue of his junior title, Baron Boyle of Marston, as his senior title is in the Peerage of Ireland)	2	2	3	3	3	3
Lord Sempill	2	2	2	3	3	3
Lord Aldington	2	2	2	2	3	-
Earl of Kinnoull	2	2	2	2	-	-
Lord Hemphill	1	1	1	-	-	-
Earl of Clanwilliam (Note: Eligible to stand by virtue of his junior title, Baron Clanwilliam, as his senior title is in the Peerage of Ireland)	1	1	-	-	-	-
Earl Lloyd-George of Dwyfor	1	-	-	-	-	-
8 others (Note: Earl of Albemarle, Lord Cadman, Lord Darling, Lord Hampton, Duke of Marlborough, Viscount Mountgarret (eligible to stand by virtue of his junior title, Baron Mountgarret, as his senior title is in the Peerage of Ireland), Lord Sudeley, and Lord Tryon)	0	-	-	-	-	-
Electorate: 28 Valid: 26 Spoilt: 0 Quota: 13 Turnout: 26

After the retirement of the Lady Saltoun of Abernethy:

Crossbench hereditary peers' by-election, February 2015
Candidate	Count 1	Count 2	Count 3	Count 4	Count 5	Count 6
✓ Earl of Kinnoull	9	9	10	10	11	12
Viscount Hood	4	4	4	4	4	5
Lord Sempill	2	3	3	3	4	4
Lord Napier and Ettrick	3	3	3	3	3	3
Earl of Cork and Orrery (Note: Eligible to stand by virtue of his junior title, Baron Boyle of Marston, as his senior title is in the Peerage of Ireland)	2	2	2	3	3	-
Lord Aldington	2	2	2	2	-	-
Earl of Clanwilliam (Note: Eligible to stand by virtue of his junior title, Baron Clanwilliam, as his senior title is in the Peerage of Ireland)	1	1	1	-	-	-
Earl Lloyd-George of Dwyfor	1	1	-	-	-	-
Lord Hemphill	1	-	-	-	-	-
8 others (Note: Earl of Albemarle, Lord Cadman, Lord Darling, Lord Hampton, Duke of Marlborough, Viscount Mountgarret (eligible to stand by virtue of his junior title, Baron Mountgarret, as his senior title is in the Peerage of Ireland), Lord Sudeley, and Lord Tryon)	0	-	-	-	-	-
Electorate: 28 Valid: 26 Spoilt: 0 Quota: 13 Turnout: 26

After the retirement of the Viscount Tenby:

Crossbench hereditary peers' by-election, July 2015
Candidate	Count 1	Count 2	Count 3	Count 4	Count 5	Count 6
✓ Lord Mountevans	9	9	9	9	9	10
Lord Aldington	3	4	5	5	5	5
Viscount Hood	3	3	4	5	5	5
Lord Sempill	3	3	3	3	4	-
Earl of Albemarle	2	2	2	2	-	-
Lord Napier and Ettrick	2	2	2	-	-	-
Lord Darling	2	2	-	-	-	-
Lord Trevethin and Oaksey	1	-	-	-	-	-
11 others (Note: Lord Cadman, Lord Cawley, Earl of Cork and Orrery (eligible to stand by virtue of his junior title, Baron Boyle of Marston, as his senior title is in the Peerage of Ireland), Lord Hampton, Lord Harlech, Lord Kilmarnock, Earl Lloyd-George of Dwyfor, Lord Oranmore and Browne (eligible to stand by virtue of his junior title, Baron Mereworth, as his senior title is in the Peerage of Ireland), Lord Rathcavan, Duke of Rutland, and Lord Sudeley)	0	-	-	-	-	-
Electorate: 28 Valid: 25 Spoilt: 0 Quota: 13 Turnout: 25

After the retirement of the Viscount Montgomery of Alamein:

Crossbench hereditary peers' by-election, October 2015
Candidate	Count 1	Count 2	Count 3	Count 4	Count 5
✓ Lord Trevethin and Oaksey	10	11	11	11	12
Lord Aldington	6	6	6	6	7
Earl of Cork and Orrery (Note: Eligible to stand by virtue of his junior title, Baron Boyle of Marston, as his senior title is in the Peerage of Ireland)	3	3	3	3	3
Lord Napier and Ettrick	3	3	3	3	-
Viscount Hood	2	2	2	-	-
Lord Vaux of Harrowden	1	1	-	-	-
Lord Clifford of Chudleigh	1	-	-	-	-
10 others (Note: Earl of Albemarle, Lord Cadman, Lord Darling, Lord Harlech, Earl Lloyd-George of Dwyfor, Viscount Massereene and Ferrard (eligible to stand by virtue of his junior title, Baron Oriel, as his senior title is in the Peerage of Ireland), Lord Monson, Duke of Rutland, Lord Southampton, and Lord Sudeley)	0	-	-	-	-
Electorate: 29 Valid: 26 Spoilt: 0 Quota: 13 Turnout: 26

After the removal for non-attendance of the Lord Bridges:

Crossbench hereditary peers' by-election, July 2016
Candidate	Count 1	Count 2	Count 3	Count 4	Count 5	Count 6	Count 7
✓ Earl of Cork and Orrery (Note: Eligible to stand by virtue of his junior title, Baron Boyle of Marston, as his senior title is in the Peerage of Ireland)	12	12	12	12	12	13	15
Lord Vaux of Harrowden	5	5	5	5	7	8	8
Viscount Hood	2	3	4	5	5	6	-
Lord Hemphill	3	3	3	3	3	-	-
Lord Aldington	2	2	2	2	-	-	-
Earl of Albemarle	1	1	1	-	-	-	-
Earl of Limerick (Note: Eligible to stand by virtue of his junior title, Baron Foxford, as his senior title is in the Peerage of Ireland)	1	1	-	-	-	-	-
Lord Napier and Ettrick	1	-	-	-	-	-	-
9 others (Note: Lord Cadman, Lord Darling, Lord Hankey, Viscount Massereene and Ferrard (eligible to stand by virtue of his junior title, Baron Oriel, as his senior title is in the Peerage of Ireland), Lord Oranmore and Browne (eligible to stand by virtue of his junior title, Baron Mereworth, as his senior title is in the Peerage of Ireland), Viscount Powerscourt (eligible to stand by virtue of his junior title, Baron Powerscourt, as his senior title is in the Peerage of Ireland), Duke of Rutland, Lord Somerleyton, and Lord Southampton)	0	-	-	-	-	-	-
Electorate: 31 Valid: 27 Spoilt: 0 Quota: 14 Turnout: 27

After the retirement of the Lord Walpole:

Crossbench hereditary peers' by-election, July 2017
Candidate	Count 1
✓ Lord Vaux of Harrowden	16
Lord Aldington	4
Lord Mostyn	4
Lord Darling	1
Lord Hemphill	1
Viscount Powerscourt (Note: Eligible to stand by virtue of his junior title, Baron Powerscourt, as his senior title is in the Peerage of Ireland)	1
3 others (Note: Lord Cadman, Lord Hayter, and Lord Somerleyton)	0
Electorate: 31 Valid: 27 Spoilt: 0 Quota: 14 Turnout: 27

- Viscount Hill originally announced his candidacy but later withdrew.

After the retirement of the Earl Baldwin of Bewdley:

Crossbench hereditary peers' by-election, July 2018
Candidate	Count 1	Count 2	Count 3	Count 4	Count 5	Count 6
✓ Earl of Devon	7	8	9	10	10	12
Lord Ravensdale	4	4	5	5	5	5
Lord Aldington	4	4	4	4	4	4
Earl of Eldon	2	2	2	2	3	3
Duke of Hamilton and Brandon	2	2	2	2	2	-
Viscount Hood	2	2	2	2	-	-
Lord Bridges	2	2	2	-	-	-
Earl of Carnarvon	2	2	-	-	-	-
Lord Meston	1	-	-	-	-	-
9 others (Note: Earl of Albemarle, Earl of Effingham, Lord Glenconner, Lord Hankey, Lord Monson, Lord Mostyn, Viscount Mountgarret (eligible to stand by virtue of his junior title, Baron Mountgarret, as his senior title is in the Peerage of Ireland), Viscount Powerscourt (eligible to stand by virtue of his junior title, Baron Powerscourt, as his senior title is in the Peerage of Ireland), and Lord Wigram)	0	-	-	-	-	-
Electorate: 31 Valid: 26 Spoilt: 0 Quota: 13 Turnout: 26

- David Armstrong-Jones, 2nd Earl of Snowdon originally announced his candidacy but later withdrew.

After the retirement of the Lord Northbourne:

Crossbench hereditary peers' by-election, November 2018
Candidate	Count 1	Count 2	Count 3	Count 4	Count 5
✓ Lord Carrington	11	11	11	12	14
Lord Ravensdale	8	8	9	9	9
Earl of Eldon	3	4	4	4	5
Lord Meston	2	2	2	3	-
Lord Aldington	2	2	2	-	-
Duke of Hamilton and Brandon	2	2	-	-	-
Viscount Powerscourt (Note: Eligible to stand by virtue of his junior title, Baron Powerscourt, as his senior title is in the Peerage of Ireland)	1	-	-	-	-
4 others (Note: Earl of Albemarle, Lord Bridges, Earl of Limerick (eligible to stand by virtue of his junior title, Baron Foxford, as his senior title is in the Peerage of Ireland), and Lord Southampton)	0	-	-	-	-
Electorate: 31 Valid: 29 Spoilt: 0 Quota: 15 Turnout: 29

After the death of the Viscount Slim:

Crossbench hereditary peers' by-election, March 2019
Candidate	Count 1
✓ Lord Ravensdale	18
Lord Meston	4
Earl of Albemarle	1
Lord Aldington	1
Lord de Ramsey	1
Lord Dormer	1
Lord Glenconner	1
Lord Hankey	1
6 others (Note: Earl of Effingham, Lord Hampton, Viscount Mountgarret (eligible to stand by virtue of his junior title, Baron Mountgarret, as his senior title is in the Peerage of Ireland), Viscount Powerscourt (eligible to stand by virtue of his junior title, Baron Powerscourt, as his senior title is in the Peerage of Ireland), Lord Southampton, and Lord Spens)	0
Electorate: 31 Valid: 28 Spoilt: 0 Quota: 14 Turnout: 28

==== 2020s ====
After the retirement of the Earl of Listowel:

Crossbench hereditary peers' by-election, October 2022
Candidate	Count 1	Count 2
✓ Lord Hampton	9	11
Lord Meston	7	10
Viscount Norwich	2	-
Viscount Rochdale	2	-
Lord de Clifford	1	-
Lord Walpole	1	-
4 others (Note: Earl of Albemarle, Lord Braybrooke, Earl of Dudley, and Lord Monson)	0	-
Electorate: 30 Valid: 22 Spoilt: 0 Quota: 11 Turnout: 22

After the death of the Lord Palmer and the retirement of the Lord Hylton:

Crossbench hereditary peers' by-election, September 2023
Candidate	Count 1	Count 2	Count 3
✓ Lord Meston	11	7.67	7.67
✓ Lord de Clifford	5	6.5	9.5
Lord Chorley	4	4.9	4.9
Viscount Rochdale	0	0.6	0.6
Lord Braybrooke	2	2.3	0.3
Lord Aldington	1	1	-
7 others (Note: Earl of Albemarle, Earl of Carnarvon, Earl Erne (Eligible to stand by virtue of his junior title, Baron Fermanagh, as his senior title is in the Peerage of Ireland), Lord Sempill, Lord Somerleyton, Lord Southampton, Lord Walpole)	0	-	-
Electorate: 32 Valid: 23 Spoilt: 0 Quota: 7.67 Turnout: 23

=== Conservative ===
==== 2000s ====
After the death of Lord Vivian:

Conservative hereditary peers' by-election, May 2004
Candidate	Count 1	Count 2	Count 3	Count 4	Count 5	Count 6	Count 7	Count 8	Count 9	Count 10	Count 11
✓ Viscount Trenchard	8	8	8	8	9	10	12	12	14	17	24
Viscount Eccles	7	7	8	9	9	9	9	10	13	15	18
Earl Cathcart	7	7	7	7	7	7	7	10	11	13	-
Viscount Weir	7	7	7	7	7	7	7	7	7	-	-
Viscount Torrington	5	6	6	6	6	6	6	6	-	-	-
Lord de Mauley	4	4	4	4	4	4	4	-	-	-	-
Lord Rathcavan	2	2	2	2	2	2	-	-	-	-	-
Lord Terrington	1	1	1	1	1	-	-	-	-	-	-
Lord Norrie	1	1	1	1	-	-	-	-	-	-	-
Lord Harlech	1	1	1	-	-	-	-	-	-	-	-
Viscount Brentford	1	1	-	-	-	-	-	-	-	-	-
Viscount Addison	1	-	-	-	-	-	-	-	-	-	-
25 others (Note: Lord Ashbourne, Lord Biddulph, Lord Birdwood, Lord Cadman, Lord Carew, Lord Chesham, Earl Cowley, Lord de Ramsey, Lord Gainford, Viscount Hood, Lord Kenilworth, Lord Killearn, Earl of Kimberley, Earl of Kinnoull, Earl of Lauderdale, Lord Margadale, Lord Milverton, Lord Morris, Lord Newall, Lord Pender, Lord Poole, Lord Rowallan, Lord Strathcarron, Lord Sudeley, and Lord Vaux of Harrowden)	0	-	-	-	-	-	-	-	-	-	-
Electorate: 48 Valid: 45 Spoilt: 0 Quota: 23 Turnout: 45

After the death of Lord Burnham:

Conservative hereditary peers' by-election, March 2005
Candidate	Count 1	Count 2	Count 3	Count 4	Count 5	Count 6	Count 7	Count 8	Count 9	Count 10
✓ Lord de Mauley	12	12	12	12	12	12	12	13	16	21
Earl Cathcart	7	7	7	7	7	7	8	10	11	13
Viscount Eccles	6	6	6	7	8	8	8	9	10	-
Viscount Torrington	2	3	4	4	4	5	7	7	-	-
Earl of Stockton	4	4	4	4	5	6	7	-	-	-
Viscount Weir	4	4	4	4	4	4	-	-	-	-
Lord Rathcavan	2	2	2	2	2	-	-	-	-	-
Lord de Ramsey	2	2	2	2	-	-	-	-	-	-
Lord Norrie	1	1	1	-	-	-	-	-	-	-
Lord Margadale	1	1	-	-	-	-	-	-	-	-
Viscount Addison	1	-	-	-	-	-	-	-	-	-
25 others (Note: Earl Alexander of Tunis, Lord Biddulph, Lord Birdwood, Lord Cadman, Earl Cowley, Viscount Gage, Lord Gainford, Viscount Gormanston (eligible to stand by virtue of his junior title, Baron Gormanston, as his senior title is in the Peerage of Ireland), Lord Harlech, Viscount Hill, Viscount Hood, Lord Killearn, Earl of Kimberley, Earl of Kinnoull, Lord Layton, Viscount Massereene and Ferrard (eligible to stand by virtue of his junior title, Baron Oriel, as his senior title is in the Peerage of Ireland), Lord Milverton, Lord Morris, Lord Newall, Lord Pender, Lord Poole, Lord Rowallan, Lord Sudeley, Lord Terrington, and Lord Vivian)	0	-	-	-	-	-	-	-	-	-
Electorate: 47 Valid: 42 Spoilt: 0 Quota: 21 Turnout: 42

After the death of Lord Mowbray and Stourton:

Conservative hereditary peers' by-election, March 2007
Candidate	Count 1	Count 2	Count 3	Count 4	Count 5	Count 6	Count 7
✓ Earl Cathcart	10	11	11	12	12	16	21
Viscount Younger of Leckie	12	13	13	14	15	16	17
Earl of Stockton	6	6	6	7	9	11	-
Viscount Torrington	2	4	6	6	7	-	-
Lord Rathcavan	4	4	4	4	-	-	-
Lord de Ramsey	3	3	3	-	-	-	-
Viscount Weir	1	2	-	-	-	-	-
Earl Alexander of Tunis	1	-	-	-	-	-	-
Lord Birdwood	1	-	-	-	-	-	-
Lord Chesham	1	-	-	-	-	-	-
Earl of Iveagh	1	-	-	-	-	-	-
Lord Margadale	1	-	-	-	-	-	-
30 others (Note: Lord Abinger, Viscount Addison, Lord Annaly, Lord Ashbourne, Lord Biddulph, Lord Cadman, Lord Darling, Lord Gainford, Viscount Gormanston (eligible to stand by virtue of his junior title, Baron Gormanston, as his senior title is in the Peerage of Ireland), Lord Harlech, Viscount Hill, Viscount Hood, Lord Killearn, Earl of Kinnoull, Viscount Massereene and Ferrard (eligible to stand by virtue of his junior title, Baron Oriel, as his senior title is in the Peerage of Ireland), Viscount Monckton of Brenchley, Lord Morris, Lord Newall, Lord Ogmore, Lord Oranmore and Browne (eligible to stand by virtue of his junior title, Baron Mereworth, as his senior title is in the Peerage of Ireland), Lord Pender, Lord Polwarth, Lord Poole, Lord Rowallan, Lord Seaford, Lord Sudeley, Lord Swansea, Earl of Swinton, Lord Terrington, Lord Vivian, and Earl of Woolton)	0	-	-	-	-	-	-
Electorate: 47 Valid: 43 Spoilt: 0 Quota: 22 Turnout: 43

==== 2010s ====
After the death of the Earl of Northesk:

Conservative hereditary peers' by-election, June 2010
Candidate	Count 1	Count 2	Count 3
✓ Viscount Younger of Leckie	17	21	22
Earl of Stockton	5	7	7
Lord Ashton of Hyde	4	4	5
Lord Rathcavan	3	3	4
Lord Colgrain	2	3	3
Lord de Ramsey	2	3	3
Marquess of Abergavenny	2	2	-
Earl of Limerick (Note: Eligible to stand by virtue of his junior title, Baron Foxford, as his senior title is in the Peerage of Ireland)	2	2	-
Viscount Addison	1	-	-
Lord Bethell	1	-	-
Lord Birdwood	1	-	-
Lord Bolton	1	-	-
Viscount Gormanston (Note: Eligible to stand by virtue of his junior title, Baron Gormanston, as his senior title is in the Peerage of Ireland)	1	-	-
Lord Gray	1	-	-
Lord Harlech	1	-	-
Lord Margadale	1	-	-
17 others (Note: Earl Alexander of Tunis, Lord Biddulph, Lord Borwick, Lord Cadman, Lord Gainford, Earl of Harrowby, Viscount Hill, Lord Killearn, Earl of Kinnoull, Viscount Massereene and Ferrard (eligible to stand by virtue of his junior title, Baron Oriel, as his senior title is in the Peerage of Ireland), Viscount Mountgarret (eligible to stand by virtue of his junior title, Baron Mountgarret, as his senior title is in the Peerage of Ireland), Lord Poole, Lord Rowallan, Lord Sudeley, Lord Swansea, Lord Vivian, and Viscount Weir)	0	-	-
Electorate: 47 Valid: 45 Spoilt: 0 Quota: 22 Turnout: 45

After the death of the Earl of Onslow:

Conservative hereditary peers' by-election, July 2011
Candidate	Count 1	Count 2	Count 3	Count 4	Count 5	Count 6	Count 7	Count 8	Count 9
✓ Lord Ashton of Hyde	19	19	20	20	20	20	20	21	23
Lord Borwick	5	6	6	7	7	7	7	7	7
Lord de Ramsey	3	3	3	3	4	4	5	5	5
Earl of Harrowby	4	4	4	4	4	4	4	4	4
Earl of Stockton	2	2	2	2	2	2	3	4	4
Marquess of Abergavenny	3	3	3	3	3	3	3	3	-
Earl of Oxford and Asquith	2	2	2	2	2	2	2	-	-
Earl of Onslow	2	2	2	2	2	2	-	-	-
Lord Rowallan	1	1	1	1	1	-	-	-	-
Lord Rathcavan	1	1	1	1	-	-	-	-	-
Lord Margadale	1	1	1	-	-	-	-	-	-
Earl of Limerick (Note: Eligible to stand by virtue of his junior title, Baron Foxford, as his senior title is in the Peerage of Ireland)	1	1	-	-	-	-	-	-	-
Viscount Addison	1	-	-	-	-	-	-	-	-
8 others (Note: Earl of Albemarle, Earl Alexander of Tunis, Lord Biddulph, Lord Cadman, Lord Killearn, Earl of Kinnoull, Viscount Massereene and Ferrard (eligible to stand by virtue of his junior title, Baron Oriel, as his senior title is in the Peerage of Ireland), and Lord Vivian)	0	-	-	-	-	-	-	-	-
Electorate: 47 Valid: 45 Spoilt: 0 Quota: 23 Turnout: 45

After the death of Earl Ferrers:

Conservative hereditary peers' by-election, February 2013
Candidate	Count 1	Count 2	Count 3	Count 4	Count 5	Count 6	Count 7	Count 8	Count 9	Count 10	Count 11	Count 12	Count 13	Count 14
✓ Viscount Ridley	14	14	15	15	15	15	15	15	16	18	18	20	21	24
Viscount Hailsham (Note: Created Baron Hailsham of Kettlethorpe for Life in 2015)	10	10	10	10	10	10	10	10	10	10	10	10	11	11
Earl of Harrowby	4	4	4	4	4	5	5	5	5	5	6	6	6	8
Lord de Ramsey	2	2	2	3	3	3	3	3	3	3	5	5	6	-
Marquess of Abergavenny	3	3	3	3	3	3	3	4	4	4	4	4	-	-
Earl of Stockton	2	2	2	2	2	2	3	3	3	3	3	-	-	-
Lord Borwick	2	2	2	2	3	3	3	3	3	3	-	-	-	-
Earl of Oxford and Asquith	1	2	2	2	2	2	2	2	2	-	-	-	-	-
Lord Windlesham	1	1	1	1	1	1	1	1	-	-	-	-	-	-
Lord Vivian	1	1	1	1	1	1	1	-	-	-	-	-	-	-
Lord Swansea	1	1	1	1	1	1	-	-	-	-	-	-	-	-
Lord Monson	1	1	1	1	1	-	-	-	-	-	-	-	-	-
Lord Margadale	1	1	1	1	-	-	-	-	-	-	-	-	-	-
Lord Darling	1	1	1	-	-	-	-	-	-	-	-	-	-	-
Earl of Clanwilliam (Note: Eligible to stand by virtue of his junior title, Baron Clanwilliam, as his senior title is in the Peerage of Ireland)	1	1	-	-	-	-	-	-	-	-	-	-	-	-
Lord Ampthill	1	-	-	-	-	-	-	-	-	-	-	-	-	-
11 others (Note: Lord Biddulph, Lord Cadman, Earl of Cromer, Viscount Gormanston (eligible to stand by virtue of his junior title, Baron Gormanston, as his senior title is in the Peerage of Ireland), Lord Harlech, Lord Killearn, Earl of Onslow, Lord Parmoor, Lord Rowallan, Lord Somerleyton, and Lord Sudeley)	0	-	-	-	-	-	-	-	-	-	-	-	-	-
Electorate: 48 Valid: 46 Spoilt: 0 Quota: 23 Turnout: 46

After the retirement of the Lord Luke:

Conservative hereditary peers' by-election, September 2015
Candidate	Count 1	Count 2	Count 3	Count 4	Count 5
✓ Duke of Wellington	18	18	18	19	21
Marquess of Abergavenny	6	6	6	6	6
Earl of Harrowby	5	6	6	6	6
Earl Ferrers	3	3	4	4	5
Earl of Limerick (Note: Eligible to stand by virtue of his junior title, Baron Foxford, as his senior title is in the Peerage of Ireland)	3	3	3	3	3
Lord Windlesham	3	3	3	3	-
Earl of Stockton	1	1	1	-	-
Lord Swansea	1	1	-	-	-
Lord Middleton	1	-	-	-	-
7 others (Note: Lord Ampthill, Lord Biddulph, Viscount Massereene and Ferrard (eligible to stand by virtue of his junior title, Baron Oriel, as his senior title is in the Peerage of Ireland), Viscount Mountgarret (eligible to stand by virtue of his junior title, Baron Mountgarret, as his senior title is in the Peerage of Ireland), Lord Rathcavan, Lord Rowallan, and Lord Sudeley)	0	-	-	-	-
Electorate: 48 Valid: 41 Quota: 21 Turnout: 41

After the death of the Lord Montagu of Beaulieu:

Conservative hereditary peers' by-election, November 2015
Candidate	Count 1	Count 2	Count 3	Count 4	Count 5	Count 6	Count 7	Count 8	Count 9	Count 10
✓ Lord Fairfax of Cameron	9	10	10	10	10	13	15	16	21	27
Earl of Harrowby	8	8	8	9	9	9	9	12	12	14
Lord Windlesham	7	7	7	7	7	8	9	9	10	-
Lord Colgrain	6	6	6	6	6	6	6	6	-	-
Lord de Ramsey	3	3	3	3	4	4	4	-	-	-
Marquess of Abergavenny	3	3	4	4	4	4	-	-	-	-
Earl of Limerick (Note: Eligible to stand by virtue of his junior title, Baron Foxford, as his senior title is in the Peerage of Ireland)	3	3	3	3	4	-	-	-	-	-
Earl of Stockton	2	2	2	2	-	-	-	-	-	-
Lord Ashcombe	1	1	1	-	-	-	-	-	-	-
Earl Ferrers	1	1	-	-	-	-	-	-	-	-
Lord Middleton	1	-	-	-	-	-	-	-	-	-
3 others (Note: Lord Biddulph, Lord Cadman, and Lord Swansea)	0	-	-	-	-	-	-	-	-	-
Electorate: 48 Valid: 44 Spoilt: 0 Quota: 22 Turnout: 44

After the retirement of the Lord Glentoran:

Conservative hereditary peers' by-election, July 2018
Candidate	Count 1
✓ Lord Bethell	26
Marquess of Abergavenny	6
Earl De La Warr	4
Lord Ashcombe	2
Lord Napier and Ettrick	2
Lord Reay	1
Earl of Stockton	1
Lord Windlesham	1
3 others (Note: Lord Biddulph, Viscount Mountgarret (eligible to stand by virtue of his junior title, Baron Mountgarret, as his senior title is in the Peerage of Ireland), Lord Rowallan)	0
Electorate: 47 Valid: 43 Spoilt: 0 Quota: 22 Turnout: 43

==== 2020s ====
Normally, by-elections must be held within three months of a vacancy occurring, but in response to the COVID-19 pandemic the House resolved in March 2020 to suspend any by-elections. Although this initial suspension was only until 8 September 2020, successive further motions extended this arrangement. Ultimately by-elections resumed in June 2021 with multiple elections held to fill six vacancies.

After the retirements of the Earl of Selborne and the Lord Denham, and the removal for non-attendance of the Lord Selsdon:

Conservative hereditary peers' by-election, June 2021
Candidate	Count 1	Count 2	Count 3	Count 4	Count 5	Count 6	Count 7	Count 8
✓ Lord Sandhurst	10	9	9	9	9	9	9	9
✓ Earl of Leicester	7	7.3	8.3	9.3	9.3	9.3	9.3	9.3
✓ Lord Altrincham	6	6.3	6.3	6.3	7.3	7.6	7.6	9.6
Lord Harlech	4	4.1	4.1	4.1	4.1	5.1	7.1	7.1
Marquess of Abergavenny	3	3	3	3	3	3	3	-
Earl De La Warr	2	2	2	2	2	2	-	-
Lord Strathcarron	1	1.3	1.3	1.3	1.3	-	-	-
Lord Windlesham	1	1	1	1	-	-	-	-
Lord Ashcombe	1	1	1	-	-	-	-	-
Earl of Carnarvon	1	1	-	-	-	-	-	-
11 others (Note: Lord Biddulph, Lord Dormer, Earl of Dundonald, Lord Elibank, Earl of Limerick (eligible to stand by virtue of his junior title, Baron Foxford, as his senior title is in the Peerage of Ireland), Lord Margadale, Viscount Mountgarret (eligible to stand by virtue of his junior title, Baron Mountgarret, as his senior title is in the Peerage of Ireland), Lord Napier and Ettrick, Lord Rowallan, Earl of Stockton, and Lord Wrottesley)	0	-	-	-	-	-	-	-
Electorate: 43 Valid: 36 Spoilt: 0 Quota: 9 Turnout: 36

After the retirement of the Viscount Ridley:

Conservative hereditary peers' by-election, February 2022
Candidate	Count 1	Count 2
✓ Lord Strathcarron	17	18
Viscount Camrose	6	6
Lord Ashcombe	5	5
Earl of Limerick (Note: Eligible to stand by virtue of his junior title, Baron Foxford, as his senior title is in the Peerage of Ireland)	3	4
Earl De La Warr	3	3
Viscount Monckton of Brenchley	1	-
Lord Windlesham	1	-
3 others (Note: Lord Biddulph, Lord Dormer, and Earl of Dudley)	0	-
Electorate: 45 Valid: 36 Spoilt: 0 Quota: 18 Turnout: 36

After the retirement of the Lord Rotherwick:

Conservative hereditary peers' by-election, March 2022
Candidate	Count 1
✓ Viscount Camrose	20
Lord Ashcombe	12
Earl of Limerick (Note: Eligible to stand by virtue of his junior title, Baron Foxford, as his senior title is in the Peerage of Ireland)	3
Lord Napier and Ettrick	1
Lord Windlesham	1
4 others (Note: Lord Baillieu, Lord Biddulph, Lord Ironside, and Lord Rowallan)	0
Electorate: 46 Valid: 37 Spoilt: 0 Quota: 19 Turnout: 37

After the retirement of the Lord Brabazon of Tara, and the death of the Lord Swinfen:

Conservative hereditary peers' by-election, July 2022
Candidate	Count 1	Count 2	Count 3	Count 4	Count 5
✓ Lord Remnant	22	13.67	13.67	13.67	13.67
✓ Lord Wrottesley	5	7.59	7.59	8.59	12.33
Lord Ashcombe	7	9.96	9.96	9.96	12.07
Earl of Limerick (Note: Eligible to stand by virtue of his junior title, Baron Foxford, as his senior title is in the Peerage of Ireland)	1	2.85	2.85	2.85	-
Lord Ashbourne	2	2.37	2.37	2.37	-
Earl of Balfour	1	1.37	1.37	1.37	-
Lord Dormer	1	1	1	1	-
Lord Windlesham	1	1	1	1	-
Lord Elibank	1	1	1	-	-
3 others (Note: Lord Baillieu, Lord Biddulph, and Earl of Dudley)	0	-	-	-	-
Electorate: 45 Valid: 41 Spoilt: 0 Quota: 13.66 Turnout: 41

After the retirement of the Lord Astor of Hever, and the death of the Earl of Home:

Conservative hereditary peers' by-election, October 2022
Candidate	Count 1	Count 2	Count 3	Count 4	Count 5	Count 6
✓ Earl of Effingham	6	8	9	9	15	12
✓ Lord Ashcombe	10	10	10	10	11	14
Lord Hazlerigg	8	8	8	9	10	10
Marquess of Abergavenny	4	4	4	5	-	-
Marquess of Bristol	3	3	4	4	-	-
Earl of Limerick (Note: Eligible to stand by virtue of his junior title, Baron Foxford, as his senior title is in the Peerage of Ireland)	2	2	2	-	-	-
Earl of Eglinton and Winton	2	2	-	-	-	-
Lord Rossmore	1	-	-	-	-	-
Lord Windlesham	1	-	-	-	-	-
11 others (Note: Lord Ashbourne, Lord Baillieu, Earl of Balfour, Lord Biddulph, Lord Dormer, Earl of Dudley, Lord Elibank, Lord Glendyne, Lord Ironside, Lord Napier and Ettrick, and Lord Rowallan)	0	-	-	-	-	-
Electorate: 41 Valid: 37 Spoilt: 0 Quota: 12 Turnout: 37

- The Earl of Minto and Lord Roborough initially announced their candidacies, but subsequently were elected at a by-election earlier the same week.

=== Liberal Democrats ===
After the death of the Earl Russell:

Liberal Democrat hereditary peers' by-election, January 2005
Candidate	Count 1
✓ Earl of Glasgow	4
2 others (Note: Earl of Carlisle and Lord Kennet)	0
Electorate: 4 Valid: 4 Spoilt: 0 Quota: Turnout: 4

After the death of the Lord Avebury:

Liberal Democrat hereditary peers' by-election, April 2016
Candidate	Count 1
✓ Viscount Thurso	3
6 others (Note: Lord Calverley, Earl of Carlisle, Lord Kennet, Earl Lloyd-George of Dwyfor, Earl Russell, and Lord Somerleyton)	0
Electorate: 3 Valid: 3 Spoilt: 0 Quota: 2 Turnout: 3

=== Labour ===
After the death of Lord Milner of Leeds

Labour hereditary peers' by-election, October 2003
Candidate	Count 1
✓ Lord Grantchester	2
Viscount Hanworth	1
9 others (Note: Lord Biddulph, Earl of Carlisle, Lord Clifford of Chudleigh, Lord Hacking, Lord HolmPatrick, Earl of Kimberley, Lord Monkswell, Viscount Samuel, and Lord Vaux of Harrowden)	0
Electorate: 3 Valid: 3 Spoilt: 0 Quota: 1 Turnout: 3

After the death of the Lord Rea:

Labour hereditary peers' by-election, July 2021
Candidate	Count 1
✓ Viscount Stansgate	unopposed

== End of by-elections ==
The Labour government elected in July 2024 stated an aim to remove of the right of hereditary peers to sit in the Lords. In anticipation of imminent legislative debates, and reflecting views that "ongoing by-elections during the parliamentary consideration of a Bill would be deeply undesirable in this context", on 25 July 2024 the House of Lords passed a motion to extend the deadline for holding a by-election to 18 months. This was later extended to 36 months, as the House of Lords (Hereditary Peers) Bill was debated in Parliament.

The Bill received royal assent on 18 March 2026, at which time there were 6 vacant seats for which by-elections had been deferred. This number subsequently grew to 11 vacancies by 29 April 2026 when the session ended and the removal of hereditary peers took effect.

The following 11 vacancies were not filled via by-election:

Party	Date vacated	Cause	Original by-election deadline	Revised by-election deadline (as per 25 July 2024 motion)	Re-revised by-election deadline (as per 22 Oct 2025 motion)
Crossbencher	20 May 2024	Resignation of the Earl of Sandwich	20 August 2024	20 November 2025	20 May 2027
Conservative	9 July 2024	Removal for non-attendance of Lord Willoughby de Broke	9 October 2024	9 January 2026	9 July 2027
Crossbencher	31 March 2025	Death of Viscount Craigavon		30 September 2026	31 March 2028
Crossbencher	23 June 2025	Resignation of Viscount Waverley		23 December 2026	23 June 2028
Crossbencher	31 August 2025	Resignation of Lord Aberdare		28 February 2026	31 August 2028
Conservative	26 February 2026	Resignation of Earl Attlee			26 February 2029
Conservative	27 March 2026	Resignation of Lord Trefgarne			27 March 2029
Crossbencher	27 March 2026	Resignation of Lord St John of Bletso			27 March 2029
Crossbencher	28 March 2026	Resignation of the Earl of Lytton			28 March 2029
Conservative	9 April 2026	Death of Viscount Bridgeman			9 April 2029
Conservative	17 April 2026	Resignation of the Earl of Liverpool			17 April 2029

== Scottish and Irish by-elections ==
From the 1707 Act of Union to the passing of the Peerage Act 1963, peers in the Peerage of Scotland elected sixteen representative peers to sit in the House of Lords. Unlike Irish peers, however, Scottish representative peers only sat for the duration of one parliament before facing re-election. By-elections were held in the Palace of Holyroodhouse to replace deceased peers. After the passing of the Peerage Act 1963, all Scottish peers were entitled to sit in the House of Lords and the election procedure was abolished.

The last Scottish representative peer by-election took place in 1959, when the Duke of Atholl was elected in place of the late Lord Sinclair.

Also, from the 1801 Act of Union to Irish independence, 28 Irish representative peers were elected from and by the Peerage of Ireland to sit in the British House of Lords. Like current hereditary peers, these representative peers sat for life terms and deceased peers were replaced in by-elections. Unlike modern hereditary peer by-elections, all peers in the Peerage of Ireland, even those who did not sit in the House of Lords, were entitled to vote. Upon the creation of the Irish Free State, the offices required to officiate these by-elections were abolished and thus no more were held, but those peers already elected kept their seats for the remainder of their lives. The last to sit in the Lords was Francis Needham, 4th Earl of Kilmorey, who died in 1961.

== See also ==
- 1999 House of Lords elections
- List of excepted hereditary peers
