= 1999 House of Lords elections =

UK election

Elections of the excepted hereditary peers were held in October and November 1999, before the House of Lords Act 1999 excluded most hereditary peers from the membership of the House of Lords allowing Earl Marshal, Lord Great Chamberlain and 90 others to remain in the House. Before the passing of the 1999 Act, the Lords approved a Standing Order stating that those 90 would consist of:

- 15 peers to be elected by the whole House
- 75 peers elected among and within party groupings:
  - 2 to be elected by the Labour hereditary peers
  - 42 to be elected by the Conservative hereditary peers
  - 3 to be elected by the Liberal Democrat hereditary peers
  - 28 to be elected by the Crossbench hereditary peers

The elections used a version of plurality block voting: voters were required to rank candidates in order of preference for the number of seats available, with the candidates receiving the greatest number of votes, without regard to the ranking on the ballots, declared elected. Preference order was only considered in the cases of ties.

Until November 2002, vacancies among the elected hereditary peers were filled by hereditary peers who received most votes in the corresponding 1999 election without being elected to remain. Since November 2002, by-elections have been held to fill vacancies.

== Election by the whole House ==
1999 House of Lords elections
- 27 and 28 October 1999
- Registered: 1,115
- Turnout: 631 (56.59%)
	First party	Second party
Party	Conservative	Crossbench
Seats won	9	2
	Third party	Fourth party
Party	Labour	Liberal Democrats
Seats won	2	2

15 excepted hereditary peers were elected by the whole House in an election held from 27 to 28 October 1999. 1,115 members of the House were eligible to vote and 631 valid votes were cast. The result was as follows:

Party	Candidate	Votes
Crossbencher	✓ The Countess of Mar	570
Labour	✓ The Lord Strabolgi	558
Conservative	✓ The Lord Elton	558
Conservative	✓ The Lord Lyell	547
Conservative	✓ The Lord Skelmersdale	544
Conservative	✓ The Lord Aberdare	530
Conservative	✓ The Lord Brougham and Vaux	525
Liberal Democrats	✓ The Viscount Falkland	519
Conservative	✓ The Lord Colwyn	488
Conservative	✓ The Viscount of Oxfuird	482
Conservative	✓ The Lord Reay	471
Conservative	✓ The Lord Geddes	461
Labour	✓ The Viscount Simon	453
Liberal Democrats	✓ The Lord Methuen	421
Crossbencher	✓ The Lord Ampthill	418
Crossbencher	The Viscount Allenby of Megiddo	327
Conservative	The Viscount St Davids	168
Crossbencher	The Lord Bridges	164
Conservative	The Lord Lucas and Dingwall	144
Crossbencher	The Baroness Strange	124
Conservative	The Earl of Onslow	119
Conservative	The Viscount Davidson	104
Conservative	The Lord Swinfen	100
Conservative	The Lord Chesham	96
Crossbencher	The Lord Walpole	93
Conservative	The Earl of Dundee	88
Conservative	The Earl of Kinnoull	84
Crossbencher	The Earl of Shannon (Note: Eligible to stand by virtue of his junior title, Baron Carleton, as his senior title is in the Peerage of Ireland)	84
Conservative	The Lord Belhaven and Stenton	60
Conservative	The Lord Morris	51
Crossbencher	The Lord Swansea	49
Conservative	The Earl of Kimberley	41
Conservative	The Lord Cadman	24

== Elections by groups ==
75 excepted hereditary peers were elected by hereditary peers of three parties and crossbenchers in elections held from 3 to 4 November 1999.

=== Conservatives ===
42 excepted hereditary peers were elected by the Conservative hereditary peers. 241 peers were eligible to vote and 204 valid votes were cast. The result was as follows:

Candidate	Votes
✓ The Earl Ferrers	190
✓ The Lord Strathclyde (Note: Still a sitting member of the House of Lords by virtue of a later life peerage (as of 22 September 2026).)	174
✓ The Lord Trefgarne	173
✓ The Lord Denham	169
✓ The Lord Mancroft	168
✓ The Earl Howe	165
✓ The Lord Brabazon of Tara	165
✓ The Earl of Caithness	161
✓ The Lord Henley (Note: Eligible to stand by virtue of his junior title, Baron Northington, as his senior title is in the Peerage of Ireland)	160
✓ The Lord Glenarthur	157
✓ The Lord Astor of Hever	151
✓ The Viscount Astor	146
✓ The Earl of Courtown (Note: Eligible to stand by virtue of his junior title, Baron Salterford, as his senior title is in the Peerage of Ireland)	143
✓ The Earl Peel	142
✓ The Lord Moynihan	137
✓ The Earl Attlee	135
✓ The Viscount Goschen	132
✓ The Duke of Montrose	127
✓ The Lord Burnham	127
✓ The Lord Vivian	126
✓ The Earl of Northesk	126
✓ The Earl of Selborne	125
✓ The Viscount Bridgeman	125
✓ The Lord Luke	124
✓ The Earl of Lindsay	116
✓ The Lord Lucas and Dingwall	115
✓ The Lord Montagu of Beaulieu	113
✓ The Earl of Home	113
✓ The Lord Glentoran	104
✓ The Earl of Onslow	99
✓ The Lord Crathorne	97
✓ The Lord Willoughby de Broke	96
✓ The Lord Inglewood	95
✓ The Lord Northbrook	95
✓ The Lord Swinfen	95
✓ The Earl of Shrewsbury	95
✓ The Lord Selsdon	94
✓ The Earl of Liverpool	93
✓ The Earl of Arran (Note: Eligible to stand by virtue of his junior title, Baron Sudley, as his senior title is in the Peerage of Ireland)	90
✓ The Earl of Dundee	90
✓ The Lord Mowbray and Stourton	88
✓ The Lord Rotherwick	88
The Viscount Trenchard	87
The Lord Norrie	87
The Viscount Weir	86
The Lord Lucas of Chilworth	82
The Viscount Addison	80
The Viscount Torrington	80
The Viscount Long	80
The Earl of Kinnoull	74
The Viscount Davidson	73
The Lord de Ramsey	71
The Lord Coleraine	70
The Lord Chesham	67
The Lord Rowallan	65
The Lord Hindlip	62
The Lord Beaverbrook	62
The Lord Birdwood	61
The Viscount St Davids	60
The Lord Renwick	60
The Earl of Limerick (Note: Eligible to stand by virtue of his junior title, Baron Foxford, as his senior title is in the Peerage of Ireland)	60
The Lord Gray	59
The Earl Cathcart	59
The Earl of Clanwilliam (Note: Eligible to stand by virtue of his junior title, Baron Clainwilliam, as his senior title is in the Peerage of Ireland)	58
The Earl Alexander of Tunis	58
The Viscount Dilhorne	57
The Lord Westbury	57
The Lord Ironside	56
The Lord Sempill	52
The Lord Harlech	52
The Lord Newall	51
The Viscount Eccles	50
The Earl of Lindsey and Abingdon	48
The Lord Belhaven and Stenton	45
The Viscount Brentford	45
The Lord Annaly	45
The Earl of Buckinghamshire	45
The Lord Poole	45
The Earl De La Warr	43
The Lord Pender	42
The Lord Strathcarron	41
The Lord Ashbourne	41
The Viscount Mackintosh of Halifax	41
The Earl of Lauderdale	40
The Lord HolmPatrick	39
The Earl of Denbigh	39
The Viscount Massereene and Ferrard (Note: Eligible to stand by virtue of his junior title, Baron Oriel, as his senior title is in the Peerage of Ireland)	38
The Viscount Hood	38
The Lord Sudeley	37
The Lord Rennell	35
The Earl of Haddington	35
The Lord Teviot	33
The Lord Wise	33
The Earl of Kimberley	32
The Lord Monk Bretton	31
The Viscount Gage (Note: Eligible to stand by virtue of his junior title, Baron Gage, as his senior title is in the Peerage of Ireland)	31
The Lord Cadman	30
The Lord Morris	28
The Lord Biddulph	27
The Lord Harmsworth	27
The Earl of Munster	26
The Lord Mountevans	25
The Lord Harding of Petherton	23
The Lord Rodney	21
The Lord Ellenborough	20
The Lord Gainford	19
The Lord Layton	14
The Lord Leigh	13
The Marquess of Ailsa	12
The Lord Elibank	12
The Lord Seaford	11
The Earl of Granard (Note: Eligible to stand by virtue of his junior title, Baron Granard, as his senior title is in the Peerage of Ireland)	10
The Lord Merrivale	8

=== Crossbenchers ===
28 excepted hereditary peers were elected by the crossbench hereditary peers. 131 peers were eligible to vote and 105 valid votes were cast. The result was as follows:

Candidate	Votes
✓ The Baroness Darcy de Knayth	85
✓ The Lord Freyberg	82
✓ The Lord St John of Bletso	81
✓ The Lord Northbourne	78
✓ The Earl of Sandwich	78
✓ The Viscount Allenby of Megiddo	75
✓ The Viscount Tenby	74
✓ The Lord Palmer	72
✓ The Viscount Slim	72
✓ The Viscount Bledisloe	70
✓ The Lord Monson	70
✓ The Viscount Brookeborough	68
✓ The Lord Bridges	68
✓ The Lady Saltoun of Abernethy	64
✓ The Lord Hylton	64
✓ The Earl Baldwin of Bewdley	63
✓ The Earl of Carnarvon (Note: The Earl of Carnarvon died on 11 September 2001 and was replaced by Lord Chorley.)	58
✓ The Earl of Listowel (Note: Eligible to stand by virtue of his junior title, Baron Hare, as his senior title is in the Peerage of Ireland)	58
✓ The Lord Moran	57
✓ The Baroness Strange	53
✓ The Earl of Erroll	52
✓ The Lord Walpole	52
✓ The Viscount Craigavon	51
✓ The Baroness Wharton (Note: The Baroness Wharton died on 15 May 2000 and was replaced by Lord Cobbold.)	48
✓ The Viscount Colville of Culross	47
✓ The Viscount Waverley	47
✓ The Lord Greenway	47
✓ The Earl of Rosslyn	45
The Lord Cobbold	43
The Lord Chorley	42
The Earl of Iveagh	40
The Lord Ashburton	40
The Lord Gladwyn	39
The Earl of Shannon (Note: Eligible to stand by virtue of his junior title, Baron Carleton, as his senior title is in the Peerage of Ireland)	39
The Earl of Kintore	39
The Earl of Effingham	38
The Earl of Clancarty (Note: Eligible to stand by virtue of his junior title, Viscount Clancarty, as his senior title is in the Peerage of Ireland) (Note: Still a sitting member of the House of Lords by virtue of a later life peerage (as of 22 September 2026).)	36
The Lady Kinloss	36
The Lord Rathcavan	35
The Viscount Runciman of Doxford	35
The Lord Hankey	34
The Lord Shaughnessy	32
The Earl of Drogheda (Note: Eligible to stand by virtue of his junior title, Baron Moore, as his senior title is in the Peerage of Ireland)	31
The Earl Cairns	27
The Lord Meston	26
The Lord Napier and Ettrick	26
The Lord Napier of Magdala	26
The Lord Norton	25
The Lord Carew (Note: Eligible to stand by virtue of his junior title, Baron Carew, as his senior title is in the Peerage of Ireland)	24
The Earl of Stair	24
The Lord Birkett	23
The Lord Dulverton	23
The Lord Lawrence	20
The Viscount Rothermere	20
The Viscount Mountgarret (Note: Eligible to stand by virtue of his junior title, Baron Mountgarret, as his senior title is in the Peerage of Ireland)	19
The Viscount Alanbrooke	19
The Viscount Exmouth	19
The Baroness Arlington	18
The Earl of Huntingdon	17
The Lord Hayter	17
The Lord Tryon	16
The Lord Dunleath	15
The Lord Craigmyle	15
The Earl of Cromer	15
The Lord Swansea	14
The Lord Nunburnholme	14
The Lord Cromwell	14
The Viscount Monckton of Brenchley	14
The Lord Wrenbury	14
The Viscount Leathers	14
The Lord Amwell	12
The Lord Broadbridge	12
The Earl of Buchan	12
The Lord Blyth	11
The Marquess of Headfort (Note: Eligible to stand by virtue of his junior title, Baron Kenlis, as his senior title is in the Peerage of Ireland)	11
The Lord Glanusk	8
The Lord Lindsay of Birker	8
The Viscount Dunrossil	6
The Lord Catto	4

=== Liberal Democrats ===
3 excepted hereditary peers were elected by the Liberal Democrat hereditary peers. All 20 peers who were eligible to vote cast their votes. The result was as follows:

Candidate	Votes
✓ The Earl Russell	17
✓ The Lord Avebury	13
✓ The Lord Addington (Note: Still a sitting member of the House of Lords by virtue of a later life peerage (as of 22 September 2026).)	10
The Earl of Mar and Kellie (Note: Created Baron Erskine of Alloa Tower for life in 2000)	7
The Earl of Carlisle	4
The Earl Grey	3
The Lord Calverley	3
The Earl of Glasgow	2
The Lord McNair	1

=== Labour ===
2 excepted hereditary peers were elected by the Labour hereditary peers. 18 peers were eligible to vote and 17 valid votes were cast. The result was as follows:

Candidate	Votes
✓ The Lord Milner of Leeds	8
✓ The Lord Rea	7
The Lord Grantchester (Note: Still a sitting member of the House of Lords by virtue of a later life peerage (as of 22 September 2026).)	7
The Lord Monkswell	6
The Lord Kilbracken	3
The Lord Kennet	3

== See also ==
- By-elections to the House of Lords
- List of excepted hereditary peers
- List of hereditary peers in the House of Lords by virtue of a life peerage
