= Lord Darling =

Lord Darling or Baron Darling may refer to:

- Baron Darling, a hereditary title in the Peerage of the United Kingdom created in 1924
  - Charles Darling, 1st Baron Darling (1849–1936), English lawyer, politician and High Court judge
- Alistair Darling, Baron Darling of Roulanish (1953–2023), British Labour Party politician and Chancellor of the Exchequer from 2007 to 2010
- George Darling, Baron Darling of Hillsborough (1905–1985), British Labour and Co-operative Party politician
