= Edmund Pery =

Edmund Pery may refer to:

- Edmund Pery, 1st Viscount Pery, Irish politician
- Edmund Pery, 1st Earl of Limerick, Irish peer and politician
- Edmund Pery, 5th Earl of Limerick, British peer and soldier
- Edmund Pery, 7th Earl of Limerick, Anglo-Irish peer
