= Lord Richards =

Lord Richards may refer to:

- David Richards, Lord Richards of Camberwell (born 1951), justice of the Supreme Court of the United Kingdom from 2022 to 2026
- David Richards, Baron Richards of Herstmonceux (born 1952), British Army officer and Chief of the Defence Staff from 2010 to 2013

== See also ==
- Ivor Richard, Baron Richard (1932–2018), British Labour Party politician and European commissioner
- Baron Milverton, hereditary peerage held by the Richards family
  - Arthur Richards, 1st Baron Milverton (1885–1978), British colonial administrator
