= Henry Hood =

Henry Hood may refer to:

- Henry Hood, 2nd Viscount Hood (1753–1836), English peer
- Henry Hood, 8th Viscount Hood (born 1958), English peer and solicitor
- Harry Hood (footballer) (1944–2019), Scottish football player and manager
