= John Pakington, 7th Baron Hampton =

British politician

The Right Honourable The Lord Hampton
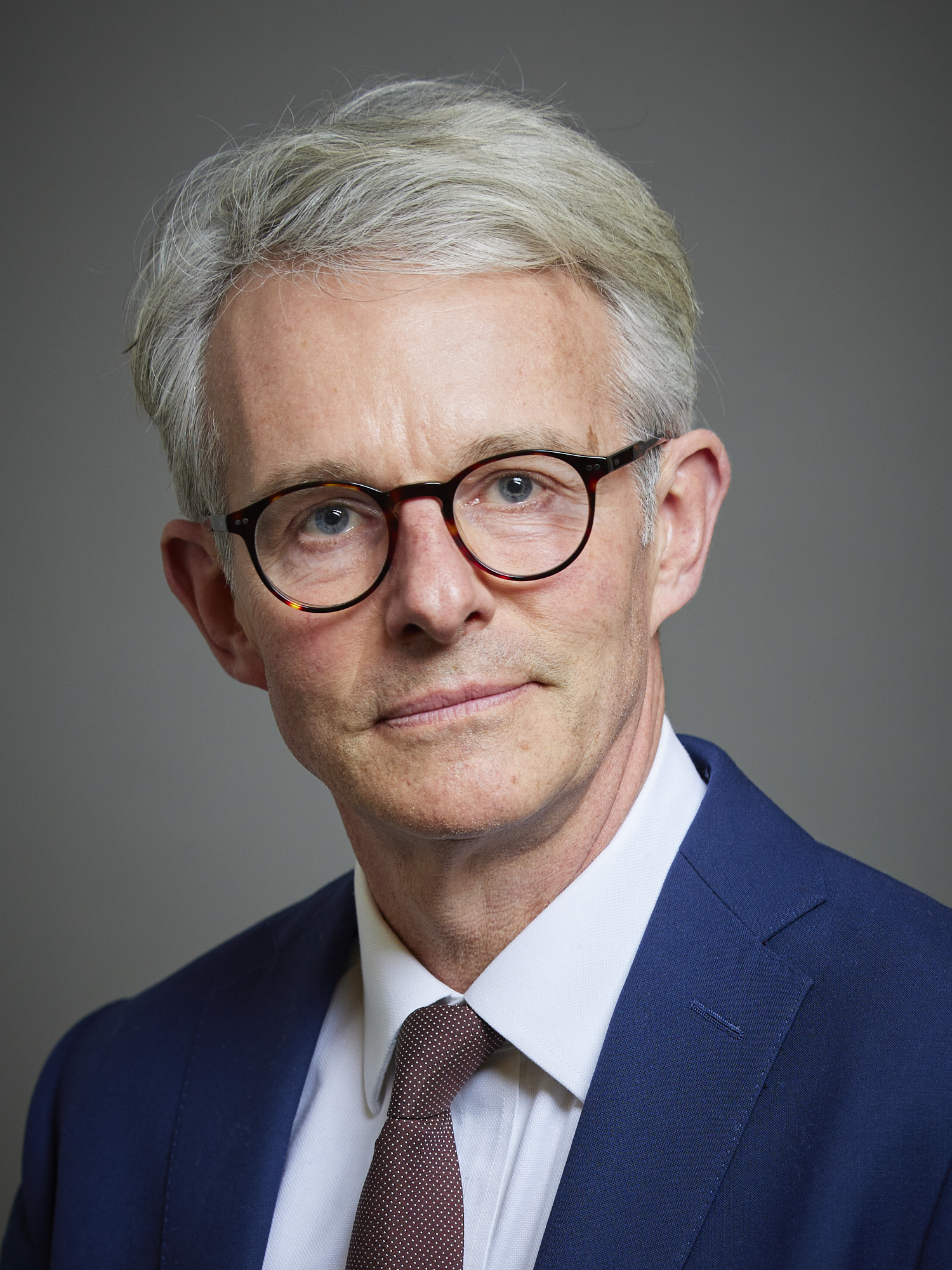
- Official portrait, 2023

Member of the House of Lords Lord Temporal
- Incumbent
- Life peerage 9 June 2026
- Elected Hereditary Peer; 25 October 2022 – 29 April 2026
- By-election: 2022
- Preceded by: The 6th Earl of Listowel

Personal details
- Born: John Humphrey Arnott Pakington; 24 December 1964 (age 61)
- Party: Crossbench

John Humphrey Arnott Pakington, 7th Baron Hampton, Baron Hampton of Newington Green (born 24 December 1964), is a British hereditary peer and a member of the House of Lords who sits as a crossbencher.

Hampton became a member of the House in October 2022, being elected in a crossbench hereditary peers' by-election. In May 2026, it was announced that he was to be given one of 26 new life peerages, returning him to the House of Lords after the coming into force of the House of Lords (Hereditary Peers) Act 2026.

He lives in Hackney, London, and has previously worked as a photographer, and Head of Department in a local state school.

Peerage of the United Kingdom
Preceded by Richard Pakington	Baron Hampton; 2003–present	Incumbent; Heir: Hon. Charles Pakington
Baronetage of the United Kingdom
Preceded by Richard Pakington	Pakington baronets of Westwood Park; 2003–present	Incumbent; Heir: Hon. Charles Pakington
Parliament of the United Kingdom
Preceded by The Earl of Listowel	Elected hereditary peer to the House of Lords under the House of Lords Act 1999; 2022–2026	Position abolished under the House of Lords (Hereditary Peers) Act 2026
