= Baron Ogmore =

Barony in the Peerage of the United Kingdom

Baron Ogmore, of Bridgend in the County of Glamorgan, is a title in the Peerage of the United Kingdom. It was created on 10 July 1950 for David Rees-Williams, a Welsh Labour, and later Liberal, politician. As of 2020, the title is held by his grandson, the fourth Baron, who succeeded his father in that year.

The first Lord Ogmore was also the father of the Hon. Elizabeth Rees-Williams and the grandfather of the actor Jared Harris.

== Barons Ogmore (1950) ==
- David Rees Rees-Williams, 1st Baron Ogmore (1903–1976)
- Gwilym Rees Rees-Williams, 2nd Baron Ogmore (1931–2004)
- Morgan Rees Rees-Williams, 3rd Baron Ogmore (1937–2020)
- Tudor David Rees-Williams, 4th Baron Ogmore (b. 1991)

The heir presumptive and sole heir to the peerage is the present holder's younger brother Hon. Dylan Rees-Williams (b. 1994)

Coat of arms of Baron Ogmore
| Crest A tiger’s head couped Proper charged on the neck with three chevronels couped Gules. Escutcheon Azure two bars wavy Argent on a chief arched of the second between as many hurts each charged with a quatrefoil Or a hurt thereon a sun in splendour of the third. Supporters Dexter a tiger Proper charged on the shoulder with three chevronels couped Gules, sinister a horse Argent. Motto Ffyddlon Hyd Angau (Faithful Unto Death) |

== See also ==
- Ogmore
- Bridgend
