= Baron Aldington =

Title in the Peerage of the United Kingdom

Baron Aldington, of Bispham in the County Borough of Blackpool, is a title in the Peerage of the United Kingdom. It was created on 29 January 1962 for the Conservative politician and businessman, Sir Toby Low. On 16 November 1999 he was made a life peer as Baron Low, of Bispham in the County of Lancashire, as were all hereditary peers of the first creation following the House of Lords Act 1999. On his death in 2000 the life peerage became extinct while he was succeeded in the hereditary barony by his son Charles, the second and (As of 2021) present holder of the title.

Lord Aldington was criticized for his role in the repatriation of Cossacks after World War II. The historian Nikolai Tolstoy accused him of being a war criminal and was sued by Aldington in 1989 for defamation. Aldington won and Tolstoy was asked to pay £1.5m in damages and £0.5m for Aldington's legal fees.

== Barons Aldington (1962) ==
- Toby Austin Richard William Low, 1st Baron Aldington, Baron Low (1914–2000)
- Charles Harold Stuart Low, 2nd Baron Aldington (b. 1948)

The heir apparent and sole heir to the peerage is the present holder's son, Philip Toby Augustus Low (b. 1990)

== Arms ==
Coat of arms of Baron Aldington
Crest Out of the battlements of a tower Or a cubit arm Proper the hand grasping a hurt. Escutcheon Gules a pale Ermine on a chief Argent masoned Sable three saffrons stalked and leaved Proper. Supporters Dexter a stag Proper sinister a black Labrador dog Proper pendant from the neck of each by its own chains a portcullis Or. Motto Spes (Hope)
