= James Meston, 3rd Baron Meston =

British peer (born 1950)

The Right Honourable The Lord Meston KC
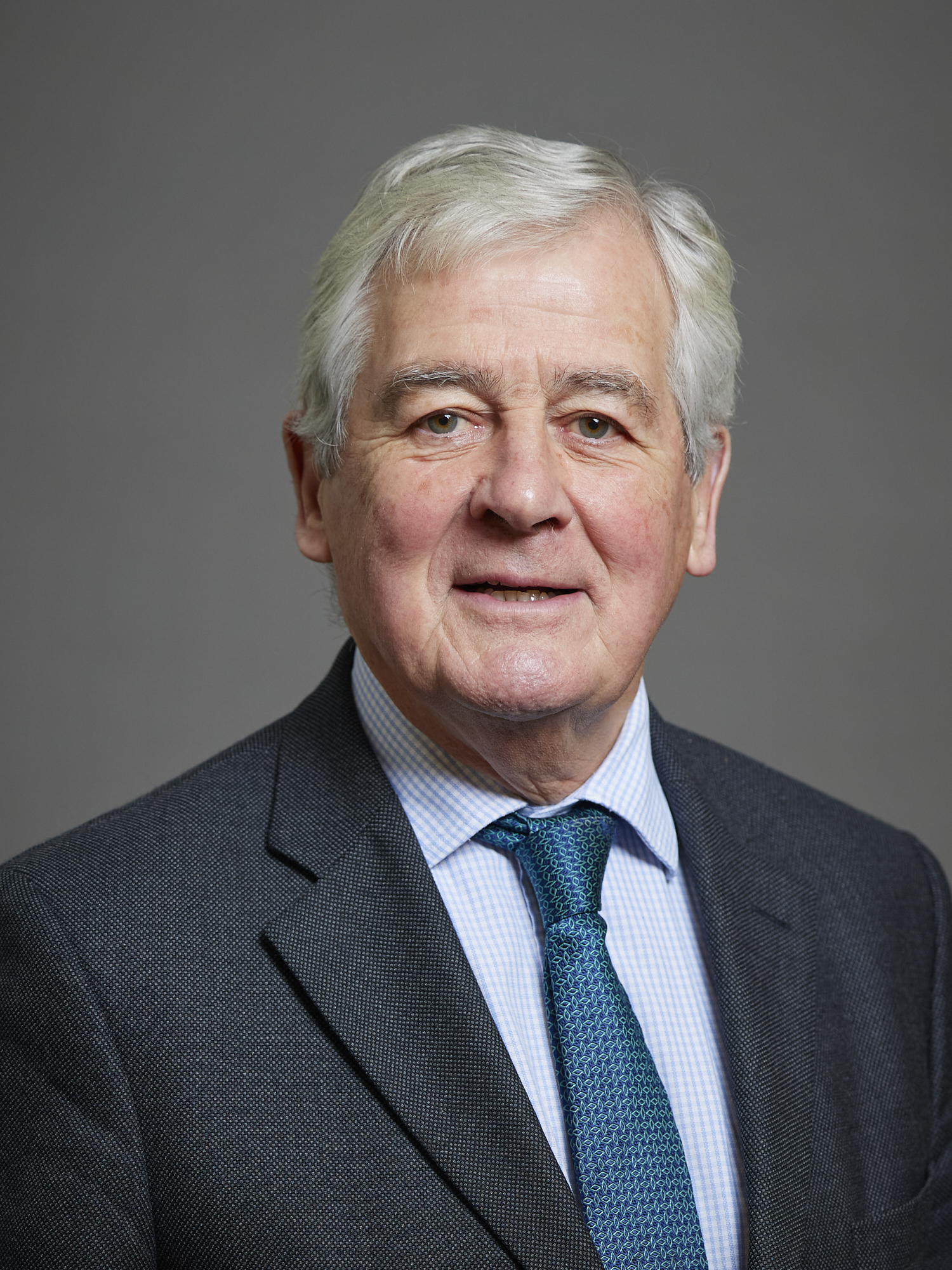
- Official portrait, 2023

Member of the House of Lords
- Lord Temporal
- Hereditary peerage 29 March 1984 – 11 November 1999
- Preceded by: The 2nd Baron Meston
- Succeeded by: Seat abolished
- Elected Hereditary Peer; 26 September 2023 – 29 April 2026
- By-election: 2023
- Preceded by: The 4th Baron Palmer
- Succeeded by: Seat abolished

Personal details
- Born: James Meston; 10 February 1950 (age 76)
- Party: Crossbench
- Parent(s): Dougall Meston, 2nd Baron Meston

James Meston, 3rd Baron Meston KC (born 10 February 1950) is a British hereditary peer, a lawyer, and a former crossbench member of the House of Lords.

== Legal career ==
Before succeeding to his family title, the Hon. James Meston (as he then was) was called to the Bar in 1973 and practiced as a barrister until 1999, mainly in family law. He took silk in 1996.

Lord Meston was then a Circuit Judge in the Central Family Court from 2000 to 2020, known under the judicial title 'His Honour James Meston KC'. After he retired, he continued to sit as a deputy circuit judge. His chambers are in the Queen Elizabeth Building in Middle Temple.

== House of Lords ==
Lord Meston succeeded to his family title in 1984, and sat in the House of Lords, as a member of the Liberal Democrats, until the passage of the House of Lords Act 1999, which excluded all but 92 hereditary peers.

He made his maiden speech in May 1984 in favour of the Child Abduction Bill. He is recorded in Hansard as having made 779 contributions before his exclusion in 1999.

He returned to the upper chamber after being elected in a Crossbencher by-election in September 2023, taking the room of Adrian, Lord Palmer.

According to his candidature statement, his legislative interests included children, domestic abuse, and divorce.

Parliament of the United Kingdom
Preceded by The Lord Palmer	Elected hereditary peer to the House of Lords under the House of Lords Act 1999; 2023–2026	Position abolished under the House of Lords (Hereditary Peers) Act 2026
Peerage of the United Kingdom
Preceded by Dougall Meston	Baron Meston; 1984–present	Incumbent
