= Ogmore =

Ogmore may refer to:

== Places ==
=== South Wales ===
- Ogmore (Senedd constituency)
- Ogmore, Vale of Glamorgan, an ancient hamlet
  - Ogmore (former UK Parliament constituency)
  - Rhondda and Ogmore (current UK Parliament constituency)
  - Ogmore-by-Sea, a village
  - Ogmore Castle, near Ogmore-by-Sea
- Ogmore Vale, a village in the County Borough of Bridgend
- River Ogmore, a river

=== Australia ===
- Ogmore, Queensland, Australia, a town

== Other uses ==
- Mr Ogmore, character in Dylan Thomas's Under Milk Wood
- Ogwr, former district in South Wales. Source of the name "Ogmore".
