= Godfrey Bewicke-Copley, 7th Baron Cromwell =

British peer (born 1960)

The Right Honourable The Lord Cromwell
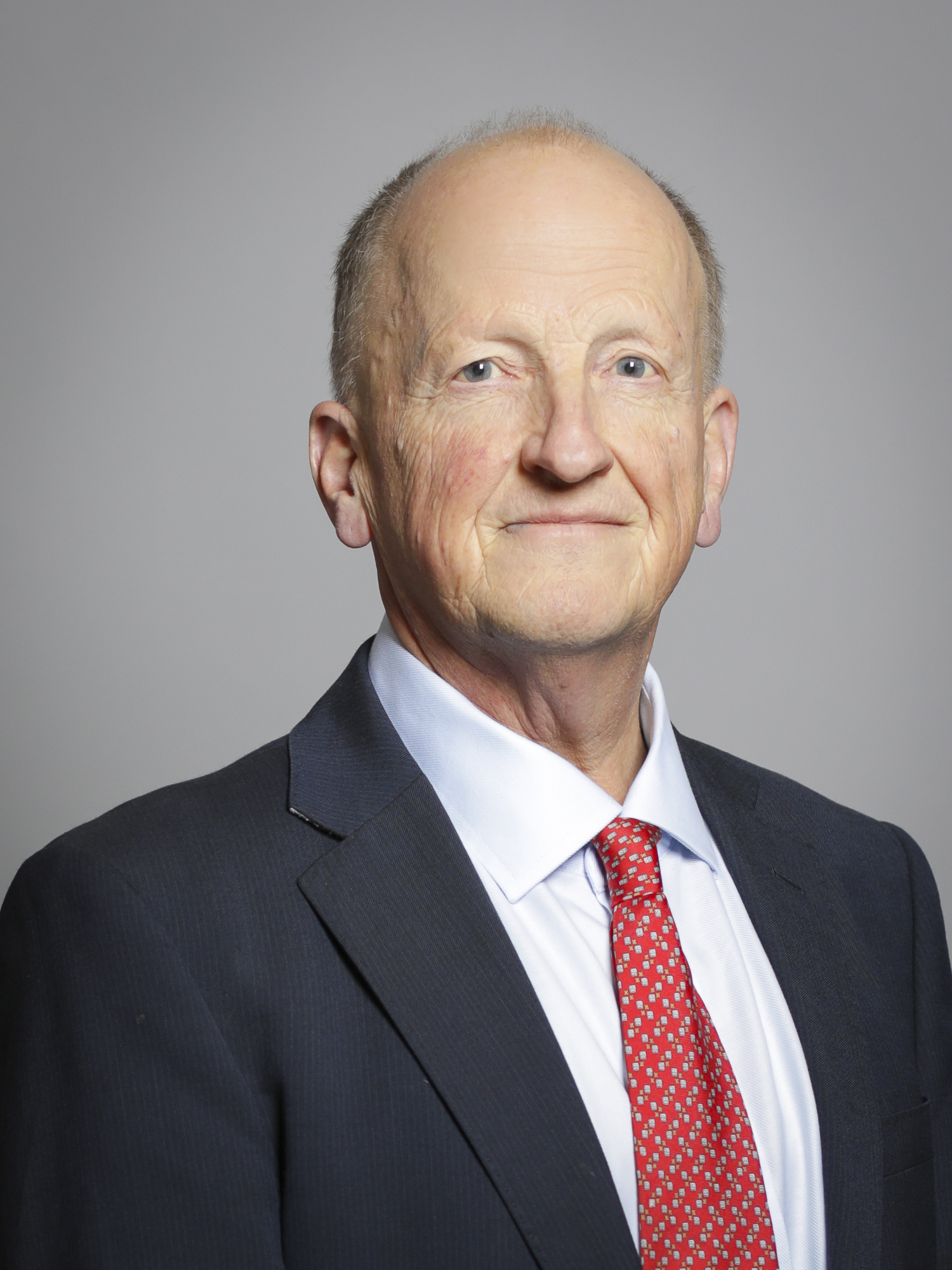
- Cromwell in 2019

Member of the House of Lords Lord Temporal
- Incumbent
- Life peerage 1 June 2026
- Elected Hereditary Peer; 10 April 2014 – 29 April 2026
- By-election: 2014
- Preceded by: The 2nd Baron Moran
- Succeeded by: Seat abolished
- Hereditary peerage 18 August 1982 – 11 November 1999
- Preceded by: The 6th Baron Cromwell
- Succeeded by: Seat abolished

Personal details
- Born: Godfrey John Bewicke-Copley; 4 March 1960 (age 66)
- Party: Crossbencher
- Education: Eton College; Selwyn College, Cambridge

Godfrey John Bewicke-Copley, 7th Baron Cromwell, Baron Cromwell of Tattershall (born 4 March 1960), is a British hereditary peer.

He has been a member of House of Lords on three separate stints, each time sitting as a crossbencher:

- Prior to the House of Lords Act 1999, which removed all but 92 excepted hereditary peers from the house, he was an active member of the House of Lords. Lord Cromwell lost his seat due to the Act.
- On 9 April 2014, Cromwell was elected to sit in the House of Lords at a crossbench hereditary peers' by-election, making him one of the 92 excepted hereditary peers. He sat until the coming into force of the House of Lords (Hereditary Peers) Act 2026 again excluded him from the chamber.
- Following a brief hiatus, on 1 June 2026 he was created a life peer as Baron Cromwell of Tattershall, of Misterton in the County of Leicestershire and he resumed his seat in the Lords the same day.

Cromwell was educated at Eton College and Selwyn College, Cambridge.

== Coat of arms ==
Coat of arms of Godfrey Bewicke-Copley, 7th Baron Cromwell

Notes
Coat of arms of the Bewicke-Copley family
Coronet
A coronet of a Baron
Crest
st: issuant from a Ducal Coronet Or a Plume of five Ostrich Feathers Argent (Copley); 2nd: A Goat's Head erased Argent armed maned and gorged with a Mural Crown Gules (Bewicke)
Escutcheon
Quarterly: 1st and 4th, Argent a Chief Gules overall a Bend Azure (Cromwell); 2nd and 3rd, Checky Or and Azure a Chief Ermine (Tatshall); overall an Inescutcheon quarterly: 1st and 4th, Argent a Cross Moline Sable (Copley); 2nd and 3rd, Argent five Lozenges in fess Gules each charged with a Mullet of the field between three Boars' Heads erased Sable (Bewicke)
Supporters
On either side a Lion Sable each charged on the shoulder with a representation of the Treasurer's Purse Or (being the badge of Ralph Cromwell, 4th Baron Cromwell)
Motto
In Cruce Vinco (I conquer by the cross)

Peerage of England
Preceded by David Godfrey Bewicke-Copley	Baron Cromwell; 1982–present Member of the House of Lords (1982–1999)	Incumbent
Parliament of the United Kingdom
Preceded by The Lord Moran	Elected hereditary peer to the House of Lords under the House of Lords Act 1999; 2014–2026	Position abolished under the House of Lords (Hereditary Peers) Act 2026
