= Francis Hare, 6th Earl of Listowel =

Irish and British peer (born 1964)

The Right Honourable The Earl of Listowel
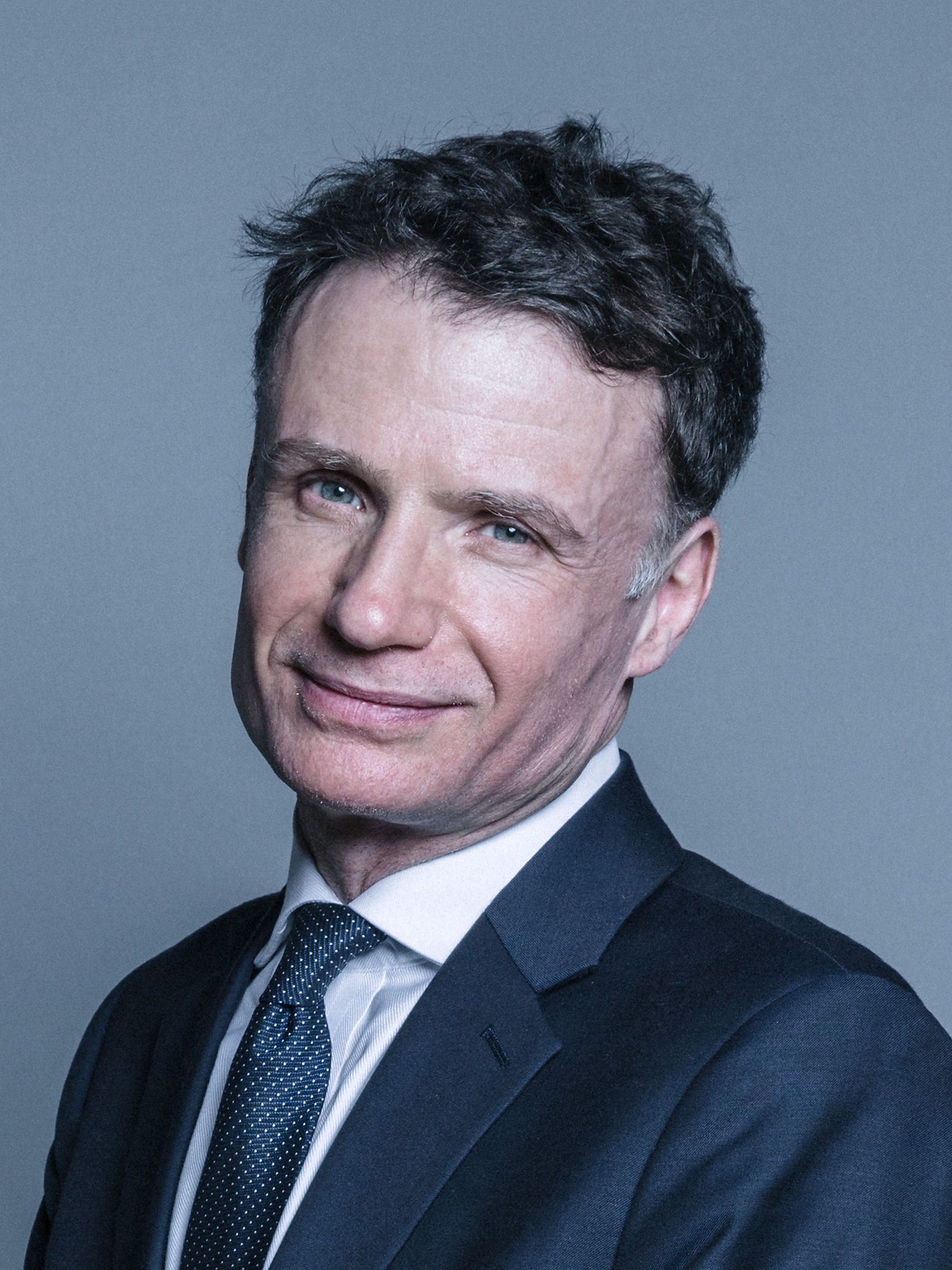

Member of the House of Lords
- Lord Temporal
- Hereditary peerage 31 July 1998 – 11 November 1999
- Preceded by: The 5th Earl of Listowel
- Succeeded by: Seat abolished
- Elected Hereditary Peer; 11 November 1999 – 21 July 2022
- Election: 1999
- Preceded by: Seat established
- Succeeded by: The 7th Baron Hampton

Personal details
- Born: 28 June 1964 (age 62)
- Party: Crossbencher
- Parent: William Hare, 5th Earl of Listowel (father)

Francis Michael Hare, 6th Earl of Listowel (born 28 June 1964), styled Viscount Ennismore until 1997, is an Irish and British peer. He first sat in the House of Lords by right of his United Kingdom peerage of Baron Hare and was later one of the ninety hereditary peers elected to remain in the House of Lords after the passing of the House of Lords Act 1999, where he sat as a crossbencher. He retired from the House on 21 July 2022.

Lord Listowel is a member of the Ascendancy, the old Anglo-Irish ruling class.

The son of William Hare, 5th Earl of Listowel, and Pamela Mollie Day, and nephew of John Hare, 1st Viscount Blakenham, he was educated at Westminster School and Queen Mary and Westfield College, London, where he graduated with a BA degree in English literature in 1992. In 1997, he succeeded to his father's titles. The earldom is named after Listowel, a town in the north of County Kerry in Ireland.

== Sources ==
- "DodOnline". Archived from the original on 8 February 2007.
- Profile, members.parliament.uk. Accessed 17 December 2022.

Peerage of Ireland
Preceded by William Hare	Earl of Listowel; 1997–present	Incumbent; Heir presumptive: Hon. Timothy Hare
Peerage of the United Kingdom
Preceded by William Hare	Baron Hare; 1997–present Member of the House of Lords (1998–1999)	Incumbent; Heir presumptive: Hon. Timothy Hare
Parliament of the United Kingdom
New office created by the House of Lords Act 1999	Elected hereditary peer to the House of Lords under the House of Lords Act 1999; Sat as Baron Hare; 1999–2022	Succeeded by The Lord Hampton
