= Gerard Collier, 5th Baron Monkswell =

British hereditary peer (1947–2020)

Member of the House of Lords Lord Temporal
- In office 27 July 1984 – 11 November 1999

Personal details
- Born: 28 January 1947
- Died: 12 July 2020 (aged 73)
- Party: Labour
- Education: Portsmouth University

Gerard Collier, 5th Baron Monkswell (28 January 1947 – 12 July 2020) was a British hereditary peer.

== Life ==
He was educated at Portsmouth University (BSc Mechanical Eng, 1971) and Thames Valley University. He succeeded to the title Baron Monkswell in 1984, and was a Member of the House of Lords from 1985 to 1999. He was a Labour Party Member of Manchester City Council from 1989 to 1994. In 1994, he was convicted of assaulting a psychotherapist who he believed had been brainwashing a woman with whom he had been having an affair, and was sentenced to 14 weeks' imprisonment, which he served in HM Prison Kirkham, an open prison.

Lord Monkswell was an unsuccessful candidate in by-elections to the House of Lords in 2003, 2005, and 2011.

He died on 12 July 2020 at the age of 73.

Peerage of the United Kingdom
Disclaimed Title last held by William Collier	Baron Monkswell; 1984–2020; Member of the House of Lords (1985 – 1999)	Succeeded by James Collier
