= Charles Low, 2nd Baron Aldington =

British peer

The Right Honourable The Lord Adlington
- Baron Aldington
- Predecessor: Toby Low, 1st Baron Aldington
- Successor: Philip Low (heir apparent)
- Born: Charles Harold Stuart Low; 22 June 1948 (age 78); London, United Kingdom
- Spouse: Dr. Regine von Csongrady-Schopf
- Parents: Toby Low, 1st Baron Aldington (father)
- Occupation: Businessman

Charles Harold Stuart Low, 2nd Baron Aldington (born 22 June 1948), is a British peer, the son of Toby Low, 1st Baron Aldington. He succeeded to the Barony on 7 December 2000.

== Life ==
Lord Aldington, formerly Charles Low, was born in London in 1948. He was educated at Winchester College, New College, Oxford (where he read Philosophy, Politics and Economics), and at INSEAD. He also attended the Baden-Baden Unternehmer Gespraeche. His early career was with Citibank and Grindlays Bank in New York, Hong Kong, Düsseldorf and London.

He worked for 28 years for Deutsche Bank. From 2002 to 2009, he was Chairman of Deutsche Bank London and Chairman of Morgan Grenfell Private Equity, following which he was a Senior Advisor for three years. He joined Deutsche Bank in 1986 and worked in Germany before joining the management of its London business in 1988. In 1997 he moved into a Corporate Finance role.

He chaired the Finance Committee at the Ditchley Foundation from 2013 to 2024 and the Investment Committee of the Royal Academy Trust as its Deputy Chairman from 2008-2012. He was Chairman of Stramongate Ltd, on the Boards of LIBA, BBA, and the British German Chamber of Commerce, a Trustee of the Institute for Philanthropy, Vice President of the National Churches Trust, a member of Oxford University's Court of Benefactors and of the Business Advisory Council to the Said Business School, Chair of the New College Development Committee, and Chair of the European Vocational College.

Aldington is married to Dr Regine von Csongrady-Schopf, an art historian, and they have three children, including a son and heir, the only heir to the barony, Philip Low.

Peerage of the United Kingdom
Preceded by Toby Low	Baron Aldington; 2000–present	Incumbent; Heir apparent: Philip Low
