= Baron Cadman =

Title in the Peerage of the United Kingdom

Baron Cadman, of Silverdale in the County of Stafford, is a title in the Peerage of the United Kingdom. It was created in 1937 for John Cadman, a mining engineer, petroleum technologist and public servant. As of 2017 the title is held by his grandson, the third Baron, who succeeded his father in 1966.

== Barons Cadman (1937) ==
- John Cadman, 1st Baron Cadman (1877–1941)
- John Basil Cope Cadman, 2nd Baron Cadman (1909–1966)
- John Anthony Cadman, 3rd Baron Cadman (b. 1938)

The heir apparent is the present holder's son the Hon. Nicholas Anthony James Cadman (b. 1977)

== Arms ==
Coat of arms of Baron Cadman
Crest A stork’s head holding in the beak a sprig of Columbine Proper. Escutcheon Azure three fleur-de-lis in pale between four pallets indented Argent. Supporters On the dexter side a stork and on the sinister side a peacock Argent beaked Gules each gorged with a collar Azure charged with a fleur-de-lis also Argent. Motto Semper Paratus

Barons Cadman line of succession
- John Cadman, 1st Baron Cadman (1877—1941)
  - John Basil Cope Cadman, 2nd Baron Cadman (1909—1966)
    - John Anthony Cadman, 3rd Baron Cadman (b. 1938)
      - (1) Hon. Nicholas Anthony James Cadman (b. 1977)
      - (2) Hon. Giles Oliver Richard Cadman (b. 1979)
    - (3) Hon. James Rupert Cadman (b. 1944)
  - Hon. Arthur Denys Cadman (1911—1999)
    - (4) Dr. John Denys Cadman (b. 1941)
    - (5) David Baker (b. 1948)
      - (6) Darcy Eryn Baker (b. 1984)
