= Edmund Pery, 7th Earl of Limerick =

Anglo-Irish peer

Edmund Christopher Pery, 7th Earl of Limerick (born 10 February 1963), is an Anglo-Irish peer and son of Patrick Pery, 6th Earl of Limerick. He was educated at Eton College, the Pushkin Institute and New College, Oxford. He then continued his studies at City University London, graduating with a diploma of law. He was known by his father's subsidiary title, Viscount Glentworth, until he inherited the earldom upon the death of his father on 8 January 2003.

== Career ==
In 1987, Limerick was admitted to Middle Temple. He then pursued a career in the Foreign and Commonwealth Office between 1987 and 1992, before becoming a solicitor with various firms until 1996. Limerick was formerly a director of Deutsche Bank.

== Titles ==
- The Honourable Edmund Pery (1963–1967)
- Viscount Glentworth (1967–2003)
- The Right Honourable The Earl of Limerick (2003–present)

Peerage of Ireland
| Preceded by Patrick Pery | Earl of Limerick; 2003–present | Incumbent |
