= Baron Milverton =

Barony in the Peerage of the United Kingdom

Baron Milverton, of Lagos and of Clifton in the City of Bristol, is a title in the Peerage of the United Kingdom. It was created on 10 October 1947 for the colonial administrator Sir Arthur Richards. He had previously served as Governor of Nigeria. His eldest son, the second Baron, succeeded in 1978.

== Barons Milverton (1947) ==
- Arthur Frederick Richards, 1st Baron Milverton (1885–1978)
- Fraser Arthur Richard Richards, 2nd Baron Milverton (1930–2023)
- Michael Hugh Richards, presumed 3rd Baron Milverton (born 1936)

The heir apparent and last heir to the title is the present holder's son Arthur Hugh Richards (b. 1963)

== Arms ==
Coat of arms of Baron Milverton
| Crest A Malay tiger’s head erased Proper gorged with a collar lozengy Argent and Gules. Escutcheon Argent three lozenges conjoined in fess Gules between two barrulets Sable all within two flaunches of the second both charged with a spear head of the field. Supporters On either side a Malay tiger Proper gorged with a collar lozengy Argent and Gules. Motto Mens Cujusque Id Est Quisque |
