= Baron Morris =

Hereditary peerage created in 1918

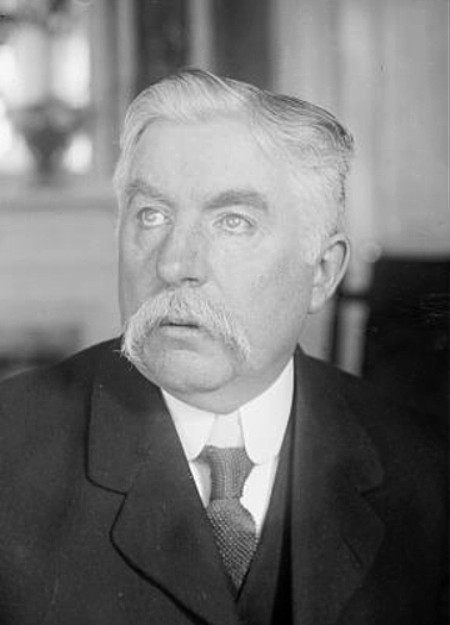
Edward Morris, 1st Baron Morris KCMG PC (1859–1935)

Baron Morris, of St John's in the Dominion of Newfoundland and of the City of Waterford, is a hereditary barony in the Peerage of the United Kingdom which was created on 15 January 1918 for the lawyer and politician Sir Edward Morris upon his retirement as Prime Minister of Newfoundland.

As of 2017 the title is held by his great-grandson Edward, the fourth Baron, who succeeded his father in 2022.

== Barons Morris (1918) ==
- Edward Patrick Morris, 1st Baron Morris (1858–1921)

== Line of succession ==
- Edward Patrick Morris, 1st Baron Morris (1858–1935)
  - Michael William Morris, 2nd Baron Morris (1903–

== See also ==
For other baronies created for persons with the surname Morris, see Baron Morris (disambiguation)
