= Baron Poole =

Barony in the Peerage of the United Kingdom

Baron Poole, of Aldgate in the City of London, is a title in the Peerage of the United Kingdom. It was created on 11 July 1958 for the businessman and Conservative politician Oliver Poole. He had previously served as Member of Parliament for Oswestry and as Chairman of the Conservative Party. As of 2017 the title is held by his son, the second Baron, who succeeded in 1993.

== Barons Poole (1958) ==
- Oliver Brian Sanderson Poole, 1st Baron Poole (1911–1993)
- David Charles Poole, 2nd Baron Poole (b. 1945)

The heir apparent and sole heir to the peerage is the present holder's son the Hon. Oliver John Poole (b. 1972)

== Arms ==
Coat of arms of Baron Poole
Crest A lion's gamb erased or, enfiled by a crown composed of four trident heads set upon a rim azure. Escutcheon Per saltire or, and barry undy argent and azure, in chief and in base a portcullis chained also azure. Supporters On either side a crane proper about the neck a purse azure garnished gold Motto Strive for the right.
