= Baron Calverley =

Title in the Peerage of the United Kingdom

Baron Calverley, of the City of Bradford in the West Riding of the County of York, is a title in the Peerage of the United Kingdom. It was created in 1945 for the Labour politician George Muff. He had previously represented Kingston upon Hull East in the House of Commons. As of 2010 the title is held by his grandson, the third Baron, who succeeded his father in 1971.

== Barons Calverley (1945) ==
- George Muff, 1st Baron Calverley (1877–1955)
- George Raymond Orford Muff, 2nd Baron Calverley (1914–1971)
- Charles Rodney Muff, 3rd Baron Calverley (born 1946)

The heir apparent is the present holder's son the Hon. Jonathan Edward Muff (born 1975)

Coat of arms of Baron Calverley
Crest In front of two miners’ picks in saltire a miner’s safety lamp all Proper. Escutcheon Azure within two barrulets wavy Argent between in chief a rose of the second barbed and seeded Proper and in base a fleece Or three ducal coronets of the last. Supporters On either side a calf Proper. Motto Labor Omnia Vincit
