= Baron Biddulph =

Barony in the Peerage of the United Kingdom

Achievement of arms – Escutcheon: Quarterly, 1st and 4th vert an eagle displayed and a canton argent (Biddulph); 2nd and 3rd or a lion rampant gules couped at all his joints of the field within a double tressure flory counterflory azure (Maitland); Crest: A wolf salient argent, charged on the shoulder with a trefoil slipped gules; Supporters: On either side a wolf Argent semée of trefoils slipped Gules; Motto: Sublimiora Petamus (Let Us Aim at Loftier Things) Note: The 1st-4th barons used only the Biddulph arms without the Maitland quarter

Baron Biddulph, of Ledbury in the County of Hereford, is a title in the Peerage of the United Kingdom. It was created on 1 August 1903 for the banker and politician Michael Biddulph. He was a partner in the London banking firm of Cocks, Biddulph and Co and also sat in the House of Commons for Herefordshire as a Liberal from 1868 to 1885 and for Ross from 1885 to 1900 as a Liberal Unionist. His father Robert Biddulph had previously represented Hereford in Parliament while his younger brother Sir Robert Biddulph was Governor of Gibraltar. As of 2017 the title is held by the first Baron's great-great-grandson, the fifth Baron, who succeeded his father in 1988. In 1978 he assumed the additional surname of Maitland, which is the maiden surname of his mother, Lady Mary Helena Maitland, granddaughter of Ian Colin Maitland, 15th Earl of Lauderdale. She is a Patroness of the Royal Caledonian Ball.

The Barons Biddulph are related to the Biddulph baronets of Westcombe. The first Baron Biddulph was a descendant of Anthony Biddulph, uncle of Sir Theophilus Biddulph, 1st Baronet, of Westcombe.

The family seat is Makerstoun House, near Kelso, Scottish Borders.

== Barons Biddulph (1903) ==
- Michael Biddulph, 1st Baron Biddulph (1834–1923)
- John Michael Gordon Biddulph, 2nd Baron Biddulph (1869–1949)
- Michael William John Biddulph, 3rd Baron Biddulph (1898–1972)
- Robert Michael Christian Biddulph, 4th Baron Biddulph (1931–1988)
- Anthony Nicholas Colin Maitland-Biddulph, 5th Baron Biddulph (b. 1959)

The heir apparent is the present holder's son Robert Julian Maitland Biddulph (b. 1994)

== See also ==
- Biddulph baronets of Westcombe
