= Henry Hood, 8th Viscount Hood =

British peer and solicitor (born 1958)

The Right Honourable The Viscount Hood DL

Member of the House of Lords
- Lord Temporal
- In office 2 October 1999 – 11 November 1999 as a hereditary peer
- Preceded by: The 7th Viscount Hood
- Succeeded by: Seat abolished (Note: Under the House of Lords Act 1999.)

Personal details
- Born: Henry Lyttelton Alexander Hood; 16 March 1958 (age 67)
- Occupation: Peer, solicitor

Henry Lyttelton Alexander Hood, 8th Viscount Hood (born 16 March 1958), is a British peer and solicitor. He succeeded to the viscountcy on 2 October 1999, after the death of his father, Alexander Hood, 7th Viscount Hood.

His mother, Diana Maud Lyttelton (1920–2008), was the second daughter of George Lyttelton of the Lyttelton family (the Viscounts Cobham), thus making Hood a nephew of the trumpeter and broadcaster Humphrey Lyttelton. Not long after succeeding his father to the title, he lost his seat in the House of Lords due to the House of Lords Act 1999 which removed all but 92 hereditary peers. He most recently stood as a crossbencher in the 2018 by-election following the retirement of the Earl Baldwin of Bewdley and came sixth.

Hood married Flora Susan Casement (b. 1959) in 1991. The Viscountess is a maternal cousin of actor Hugh Grant. The couple have three sons and two daughters.

Hood was educated at Eton College and obtained a Master of Arts degree at the University of Edinburgh before gaining law qualifications at the College of Law in 1987. He is a well-established practising solicitor specialising in family law and mediation, and heads the Family Law department at Hunters in the City of London.

In August 2024 he was appointed a deputy lieutenant of the county of Dorset.

== Notes ==
Peerage of Great Britain
Preceded by Alexander Hood	Viscount Hood; 1999–present Member of the House of Lords (1999–1999)	Incumbent; Heir apparent: Hon. Archibald Hood
Preceded by Alexander Hood	Baron Hood; 1999–present	Incumbent; Heir apparent: Hon. Archibald Hood
Peerage of Ireland
Preceded by Alexander Hood	Baron Hood; 1999–present	Incumbent; Heir apparent: Hon. Archibald Hood
Baronetage of Great Britain
Preceded by Alexander Hood	Hood baronets of Catherington; 1999–present	Incumbent; Heir apparent: Hon. Archibald Hood
