= Viscount Leathers =

Viscountcy in the Peerage of the United Kingdom

Viscount Leathers, of Purfleet in the County of Essex, is a title in the Peerage of the United Kingdom. It was created on 18 January 1954 for the businessman, Conservative politician and public servant Frederick Leathers, 1st Baron Leathers. He had already been created Baron Leathers, of Purfleet in the County of Essex, on 19 May 1941, also in the Peerage of the United Kingdom. As of 2020 the titles are held by his grandson, the third Viscount, who succeeded his father in 1996.

== Viscounts Leathers (1954) ==
- Frederick James Leathers, 1st Viscount Leathers (1883–1965)
- Frederick Alan Leathers, 2nd Viscount Leathers (1908–1996)
- Christopher Graeme Leathers, 3rd Viscount Leathers (b. 1941)

The heir apparent is the present holder's son Hon. James Frederick Leathers (b. 1969).

== Line of Succession ==
- Frederick James Leathers, 1st Viscount Leathers (1883 – 1965)
  - Frederick Alan Leathers, 2nd Viscount Leathers (1908 – 1996)
    - Christopher Graeme Leathers, 3rd Viscount Leathers (born 1941)
      - (1) Hon. James Frederick Leathers (b. 1969)
    - (2) Hon. Jeremy Baxter Leathers (b. 1946)
      - (3) Luke Alexander Leathers (b. 1974)
  - Hon. Leslie John Leathers (1911 – 2002)
    - (4) Michael John Nash Leathers (b. 1938)
      - (5) Simon Michael John Leathers (b. 1964)
      - (6) Sean Patrick James Leathers (b. 1966)
      - (7) Richard Anthony Leathers (b. 1968)
      - (8) Benjamin Matthew Leathers (b. 1971)
      - (9) Nicholas Paul Tarquin Leathers (b. 1974)
    - (10) David Frederick James Leathers (b. 1942)
      - (11) Jonathan James Leathers (b. 1974)
        - (12) Frederick Alexander Leathers (b. 2008)
        - (13) Jasper Jonathan Leathers (b. 2009)
      - (14) Andrew Thomas Leathers (b. 1975)

== Arms ==
Coat of arms of Viscount Leathers

Crest
A lozenge Sable in front of two anchors in saltire Or.
Escutcheon
Azure a lymphad sails set Or flags flying to the dexter Gules on a chief of the second three lozenges Sable.
Supporters
Dexter a sea-lion sinister a sea horse Argent gorged with a collar of lozenges conjoined Sable.
Motto
Dum Spiro Servo (While I Breathe I Serve)
