= Baron Gladwyn =

Extinct UK peerage

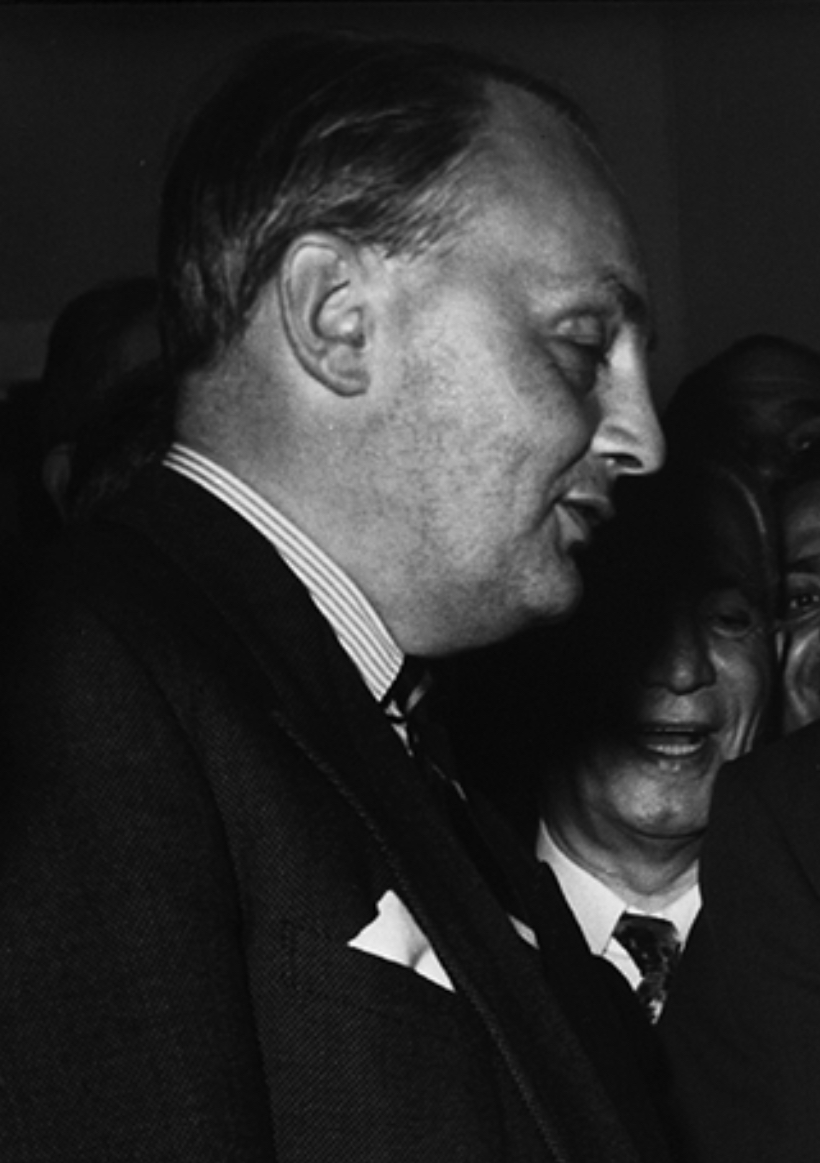
Gladwyn with Iranian Prime Minister, Mohammad Mossadegh

Baron Gladwyn, of Bramfield in the County of Suffolk, was a title in the Peerage of the United Kingdom. It was created in 1960 for the prominent civil servant and diplomat Gladwyn Jebb. He was Acting Secretary-General of the United Nations from 1945 to 1946 and British Ambassador to France between 1954 and 1960.

The title became extinct in 2017 on the death of his son, the second Baron, who succeeded in 1996.

== Barons Gladwyn (1960) ==
- Hubert Miles Gladwyn Jebb, 1st Baron Gladwyn (1900–1996)
- Miles Alvery Gladwyn Jebb, 2nd Baron Gladwyn (1930–2017)
