= Timothy Byng, 11th Viscount Torrington =

British peer

Timothy Howard St George Byng, 11th Viscount Torrington, born 13 July 1943, is a British peer.

He succeeded his grandfather, Arthur Byng, 10th Viscount Torrington (1876–1961).

Byng has three daughters and no sons. His title, through male primogeniture, will likely pass to a distant Canadian cousin.

== Arms ==
Coat of arms of Timothy Byng, 11th Viscount Torrington
Coronet That of a viscount. Crest An heraldic antelope ermine. Escutcheon Quarterly, sable and argent, in the 1st quarter a lion rampant of the second. Supporters Dexter, an heraldic antelope ermine, armed, unguled, maned and tufted or, standing on a ship’s gun proper; sinister, a sea-horse also proper also on a ship’s gun. Motto Tuebor (I will defend).

Peerage of Great Britain
Preceded by Arthur Stanley Byng	Viscount Torrington; 1961–present	Incumbent
