= Baron Darling =

Title in the Peerage of the United Kingdom

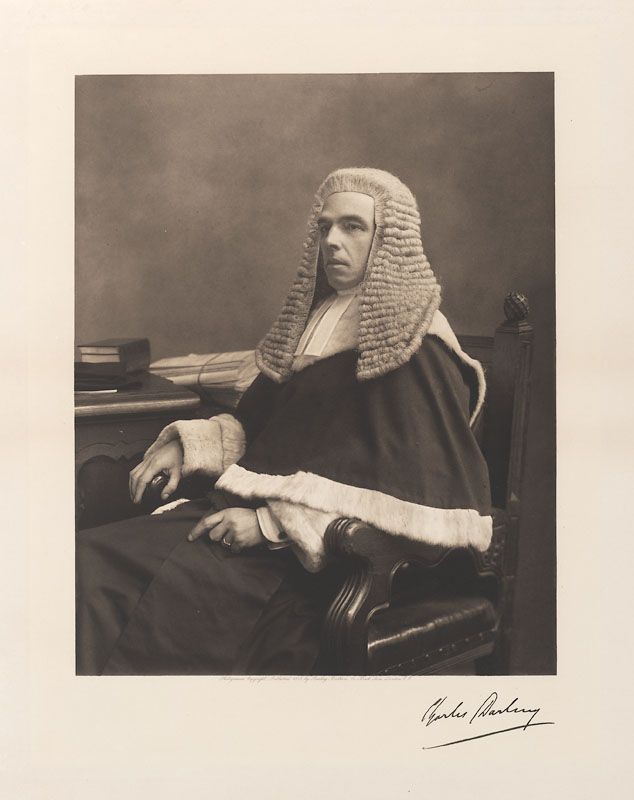
Charles Darling, 1st Baron Darling

Baron Darling, of Langham in the County of Essex, is a title in the Peerage of the United Kingdom. It was created on 12 January 1924 for Sir Charles Darling, a former Conservative Member of Parliament for Deptford and Judge of the High Court of Justice. As of 2017 the title is held by his great-grandson, the third Baron, who succeeded his father in 2003.

The family seat is Intwood Hall, near Intwood, Norfolk.

== Barons Darling (1924—) ==
- Charles John Darling, 1st Baron Darling (1849–1936)
  - The Hon. John Clive Darling (1887—1933)
    - Robert Charles Henry Darling, 2nd Baron Darling (1919–2003)
      - Robert Julian Henry Darling, 3rd Baron Darling (1944—)
        - (1) The Hon. Robert James Cyprian Darling (1972—)
          - (2) Robert Jack Lewis Darling (2008—)
        - (3) The Hon. Henry Thomas Unthank Darling (1978—)
    - James Weyland Darling (1922—1941)

The heir apparent is the present holder's son, the Hon. Robert James Cyprian Darling (born 1972).

The heir apparent's heir apparent is the present holder's grandson, Robert Jack Lewis Darling (born 2008).

== Arms ==
Coat of arms of Baron Darling
Crest In front of a dexter cubit arm Proper holding in the hand a heart Gules a chaplet of laurel Vert over the crest the motto Dei Donum. Escutcheon Argent on a chevron engrailed between three fleshpots Sable a stirrup leathered Or. Supporters On either side a pegasus Argent charged on the wing with a chevron engrailed Sable. Motto Aye Be Honest Badge A sprig of heather and a sprig of gorse in saltire Proper engiled by a baron’s coronet Or.
