= List of hereditary peers in the House of Lords by virtue of a life peerage =

This article is a list of hereditary peers who are or have been members of the House of Lords by virtue of a life peerage under the Appellate Jurisdiction Act 1876 and Life Peerages Act 1958.

== List of hereditary peers with life peerages ==
Living
Living but left the House of Lords

Key
| ^{1} | Hereditary peers of first creation living at the time the House of Lords Act 1999 came into force. |
| ^{2} | Hereditary peers who had served as Leader of the House of Lords living at the time the House of Lords Act 1999 came into force. |
| ^{3} | Suo jure hereditary peeress not otherwise able to enter the House before the Peerage Act 1963. |
| ^{♣} | Title in Peerage of Ireland that did not provide eligibility to sit in the House of Lords, but was used as a formal style |
| ^{†} | Died in office |
| ^{Res} | Resigned from the House of Lords under Section 1 of the House of Lords Reform Act 2014 |

Hereditary peers with life peerages
| Hereditary peer | Hereditary peerage | Life peerage | Affiliation | Hereditary title inherited/created | Life title created | Left House | Ref. |
|---|---|---|---|---|---|---|---|
| Irene Curzon^{3} | 2nd Baroness Ravensdale | Baroness Ravensdale of Kedleston | Crossbencher | 1925 (Note: Women were not eligible to sit in the House of Lords by virtue of a hereditary peerage before the Peerage Act 1963.) | 1958 | 1966^{†} | |
| Robert Lindsay | 29th Earl of Crawford; 12th Earl of Balcarres | Baron Balniel | Conservative | 1975 (Dec) | 1975 (Jan) | 2019^{Res} | |
| George Younger | 4th Viscount Younger of Leckie | Baron Younger of Prestwick | Conservative | 1997 | 1992 | 2003^{†} | |
| George Jellicoe^{2} | 2nd Earl Jellicoe | Baron Jellicoe of Southampton | Conservative | 1935 (Note: Became eligible to sit in the House of Lords upon turning 21 years in 1939.) | 1999 | 2007^{†} | |
| Peter Carington^{2} | 6th Baron Carrington | Baron Carington of Upton | Conservative | 1938 (Note: Became eligible to sit in the House of Lords upon turning 21 years in 1940.) | 1999 | 2018^{†} | |
| Frank Pakenham^{1} ^{2} | 7th Earl of Longford^{♣} 1st Baron Pakenham | Baron Pakenham of Cowley | Labour | 1945 (Note: Succeeded his brother as Earl of Longford in 1961.) | 1999 | 2001^{†} | |
| Malcolm Shepherd^{2} | 2nd Baron Shepherd | Baron Shepherd of Spalding | Labour | 1954 | 1999 | 2001^{†} | |
| John Ganzoni^{2} | 2nd Baron Belstead | Baron Ganzoni | Conservative | 1958 | 1999 | 2005^{†} | |
| Antony Armstrong-Jones^{1} | 1st Earl of Snowdon | Baron Armstrong-Jones | Crossbencher | 1961 | 1999 | 2016^{Res} | |
| Toby Low^{1} | 1st Baron Aldington | Baron Low | Conservative | 1962 | 1999 | 2000^{†} | |
| Frederick Erroll^{1} | 1st Baron Erroll of Hale | Baron Errol of Kilmun | Conservative | 1964 | 1999 | 2000^{†} | |
| David Hennessy^{2} | 3rd Baron Windlesham | Baron Hennessy | Conservative | 1968 | 1999 | 2010^{†} | |
| Robert Gascoyne-Cecil^{2} | 7th Marquess of Salisbury | Baron Gascoyne-Cecil | Conservative | 1992 (Note: Summoned to Parliament as Baron Cecil (known as Viscount Cranborne) by writ of acceleration in 1992. Succeeded his father as Marquess of Salisbury in 2003.) | 1999 | 2017^{Res} | |
| Julian Grenfell | 3rd Baron Grenfell | Baron Grenfell of Kilvey | Labour | 1976 | 2000 | 2014^{Res} | |
| Thomas Lyttelton | 3rd Viscount Chandos | Baron Lyttelton of Aldershot | Labour | 1982 | 2000 | | |
| Richard Lyon-Dalberg-Acton | 4th Baron Acton | Baron Acton of Bridgnorth | Labour | 1989 | 2000 | 2010^{†} | |
| Frederick Ponsonby | 4th Baron Ponsonby of Shulbrede | Baron Ponsonby of Roehampton | Labour | 1990 | 2000 | | |
| Rupert Mitford | 6th Baron Redesdale | Baron Mitford | Liberal Democrats | 1991 | 2000 | | |
| Anthony Gueterbock | 18th Baron Berkeley | Baron Gueterbock | Labour | 1992 | 2000 | | |
| James Erskine | 14th Earl of Mar 16th Earl of Kellie | Baron Erskine of Alloa Tower | Liberal Democrats | 1994 | 2000 | 2017^{Res} | |
| Michael Kerr | 13th Marquess of Lothian | Baron Kerr of Monteviot | Conservative | 2004 | 2010 | 2024^{†} | |
| Douglas Hogg | 3rd Viscount Hailsham | Baron Hailsham of Kettlethorpe | Conservative | 2001 | 2015 | | |
| Charles Hay | 16th Earl of Kinnoull | Baron Kinnoull of the Ochils | Crossbencher | 2013 (Note: Elected as an excepted hereditary peer in a by-election in 2015.) | 2026 | | |
| Dominic Hubbard | 6th Baron Addington | Baron Hubbard | Liberal Democrats | 1982 (Note: Became eligible to sit in the House of Lords upon turning 21 years in 1984. Continued to sit after the House of Lords Act 1999 by virtue of being elected as an excepted hereditary peer.) | 2026 | | |
| John Russell | 7th Earl Russell | Baron Russell of Forest Hill | Liberal Democrats | 2014 (Note: Elected as an excepted hereditary peer in a by-election in 2023.) | 2026 | | |
| Charles Wellesley | 9th Duke of Wellington | Baron Wellington of Stratfield Saye | Crossbencher | 2014 | 2026 | | |
| Godfrey Bewicke-Copley | 7th Baron Cromwell | Baron Cromwell of Tattershall | Crossbencher | 1982 (Note: Excluded under the House of Lords Act 1999, but returned in 2014 by virtue of being elected as an excepted hereditary peer in a by-election.) | 2026 | | |
| Sebastian Grigg | 4th Baron Altrincham | Baron Altrincham of Islington | Conservative | 2020 (Note: Elected as an excepted hereditary peer in a by-election in 2021.) | 2026 | | |
| Edward Howard | 8th Earl of Effingham | Baron Effingham of Bookham Commons | Conservative | 2022 (Note: Elected as an excepted hereditary peer in a by-election in 2022.) | 2026 | | |
| Stephen Benn | 3rd Viscount Stansgate | Baron Stansgate of Holland Park | Labour | 2014 | 2026 | | |
| Thomas Galbraith | 2nd Baron Strathclyde | Baron Strathclyde of Barskimming | Conservative | 1985 (Note: Continued to sit after the House of Lords Act 1999 by virtue of being elected as an excepted hereditary peer.) | 2026 | | |
| Colin Moynihan | 4th Baron Moynihan | Baron Moynihan of Purbeck | Conservative | 1991 (Note: Succession confirmed by the House of Lords in 1997. Continued to sit after the House of Lords Act 1999 by virtue of being elected as an excepted hereditary peer.) | 2026 | | |
| Nicholas Trench | 9th Earl of Clancarty^{♣} 8th Viscount Clancarty | Baron Clancarty of the Hangers | Crossbencher | 1995 (Note: Excluded under the House of Lords Act 1999, but returned in 2010 by virtue of being elected as an excepted hereditary peer in a by-election.) | 2026 | | |
| Rupert Ponsonby | 7th Baron de Mauley | Baron de Mauley of Canford | Conservative | 2002 (Note: Elected as an excepted hereditary peer in a by-election in 2005.) | 2026 | | |
| Giles Goschen | 4th Viscount Goschen | Baron Hawkhurst | Conservative | 1977 (Note: Became eligible to sit in the House of Lords upon turning 21 years in 1986. Continued to sit after the House of Lords Act 1999 by virtue of being elected as an excepted hereditary peer.) | 2026 | | |
| Simon Russell | 3rd Baron Russell of Liverpool | Baron Russell of Kiloran | Crossbencher | 1981 (Note: Excluded under the House of Lords Act 1999, but returned in 2014 by virtue of being elected as an excepted hereditary peer in a by-election.) | 2026 | | |
| Charles Colville | 5th Viscount Colville of Culross | Baron Colville of Waveney | Crossbencher | 2010 (Note: Elected as an excepted hereditary peer in a by-election in 2011.) | 2026 | | |
| John Pakington | 7th Baron Hampton | Baron Hampton of Newington Green | Crossbencher | 2003 | 2026 | | |
| Frederick Curzon | 7th Earl Howe | Baron Curzon of Amersham | Conservative | 1984 (Note: Continued to sit after the House of Lords Act 1999 by virtue of being elected as an excepted hereditary peer.) | 2026 | | |
| Massey Lopes | 4th Baron Roborough | Baron Lopes | Conservative | 2015 | 2026 | | |
| Richard Gilbey | 12th Baron Vaux of Harrowden | Baron Gilbey | Crossbencher | 2014 (Note: Elected as an excepted hereditary peer in a by-election in 2017.) | 2026 | | |
| Mark Cubitt | 5th Baron Ashcombe | Baron Ashcombe of Boldre | Conservative | 2013 | 2026 | | |
| Patrick Stopford | 9th Earl of Courtown^{♣} 8th Baron Saltersford | Baron Stopford of Saltersford | Conservative | 1975 (Note: Continued to sit after the House of Lords Act 1999 by virtue of being elected as an excepted hereditary peer.) | 2026 | | |
| Jonathan Berry | 5th Viscount Camrose | Baron Berry | Conservative | 2016 | 2026 | | |
| Daniel Mosley | 4th Baron Ravensdale | Baron Ravensdale of Little Eaton | Crossbencher | 2017 (Note: Elected as an excepted hereditary peer in a by-election in 2019.) | 2026 | | |
| John Suenson-Taylor | 3rd Baron Grantchester | Baron Grantchester of Audlem | Labour | 1995 (Note: Excluded under the House of Lords Act 1999, but returned in 2003 by virtue of being elected as an excepted hereditary peer in a by-election.) | 2026 | | |
| Aeneas Mackay | 15th Lord Reay | Baron Reay of Reay | Conservative | 2013 | 2026 | | |
| Jasset Ormsby-Gore | 7th Baron Harlech | Baron Harlech of Glyn Cywarch | Conservative | 2016 | 2026 | | |
| Richard Denison | 9th Baron Londesborough | Baron Londesborough of Richmond Hill | Crossbencher | 1968 (Note: Became eligible to sit in the House of Lords upon turning 21 years in 1980. Excluded under the House of Lords Act 1999, but returned in 2021 by virtue of being elected as an excepted hereditary peer in a by-election.) | 2026 | | |
| William Stonor | 8th Baron Camoys | Baron Stonor | Conservative | 2023 (Note: Elected as an excepted hereditary peer in a by-election in 2023.) | 2026 | | |
| Timothy Elliot-Murray-Kynynmound | 7th Earl of Minto | Baron Minto of Burncrooks | Conservative | 2005 | 2026 | | |

== List of Law Lords who became hereditary peers ==
Law Lords with Hereditary peerages
| Hereditary peer | Hereditary peerage | Life peerage | Hereditary title created | Life title created | Left House | Ref. |
|---|---|---|---|---|---|---|
| Michael Morris | 1st Baron Killanin | Baron Morris | 1900 | 1898 | 1901^{†} | |
| John Hamilton | 1st Viscount Sumner | Baron Sumner | 1927 | 1913 | 1930^{†} | |
| Thomas Shaw | 1st Baron Craigmyle | Baron Shaw | 1929 | 1909 | 1937^{†} | |
| Frederic Maugham | 1st Viscount Maugham | Baron Maugham | 1939 | 1935 | 1958^{†} | |
| Gavin Simonds | 1st Viscount Simonds | Baron Simonds | 1954 | 1944 | 1971^{†} | |
| Gavin Simonds | 1st Baron Simonds | Baron Simonds | 1952 | 1944 | 1971^{†} | |
| Cyril Radcliffe | 1st Viscount Radcliffe | Baron Radcliffe | 1962 | 1949 | 1977^{†} | |

== List of life peers who have disclaimed hereditary peerage ==
Life peers with disclaimed hereditary peerages
| Disclaimed by | Disclaimed peerage (Note: Primary disclaimed title, subsidiary titles not listed here.) | Life peerage | Affiliation | Hereditary title inherited | Hereditary title disclaimed | Life title created | Left House | Ref. |
|---|---|---|---|---|---|---|---|---|
| Michael Berry | 3rd Viscount Camrose | Baron Hartwell | Crossbencher | 1995 | 1995 | 1968 | 2001^{†} | |
| Quintin Hogg | 2nd Viscount Hailsham | Baron Hailsham of St Marylebone | Conservative | 1950 | 1963 | 1970 | 2001^{†} | |
| Alec Douglas-Home | 14th Earl of Home | Baron Home of the Hirsel | Conservative | 1951 | 1963 | 1974 | 1995^{†} | |
| James Douglas-Hamilton | 11th Earl of Selkirk | Baron Selkirk of Douglas | Conservative | 1994 | 1994 | 1997 | 2023^{Res} | |
