= William Stonor, 8th Baron Camoys =

British hereditary peer and Conservative member of the House of Lords (born 1974)

The Right Honourable The Lord Camoys
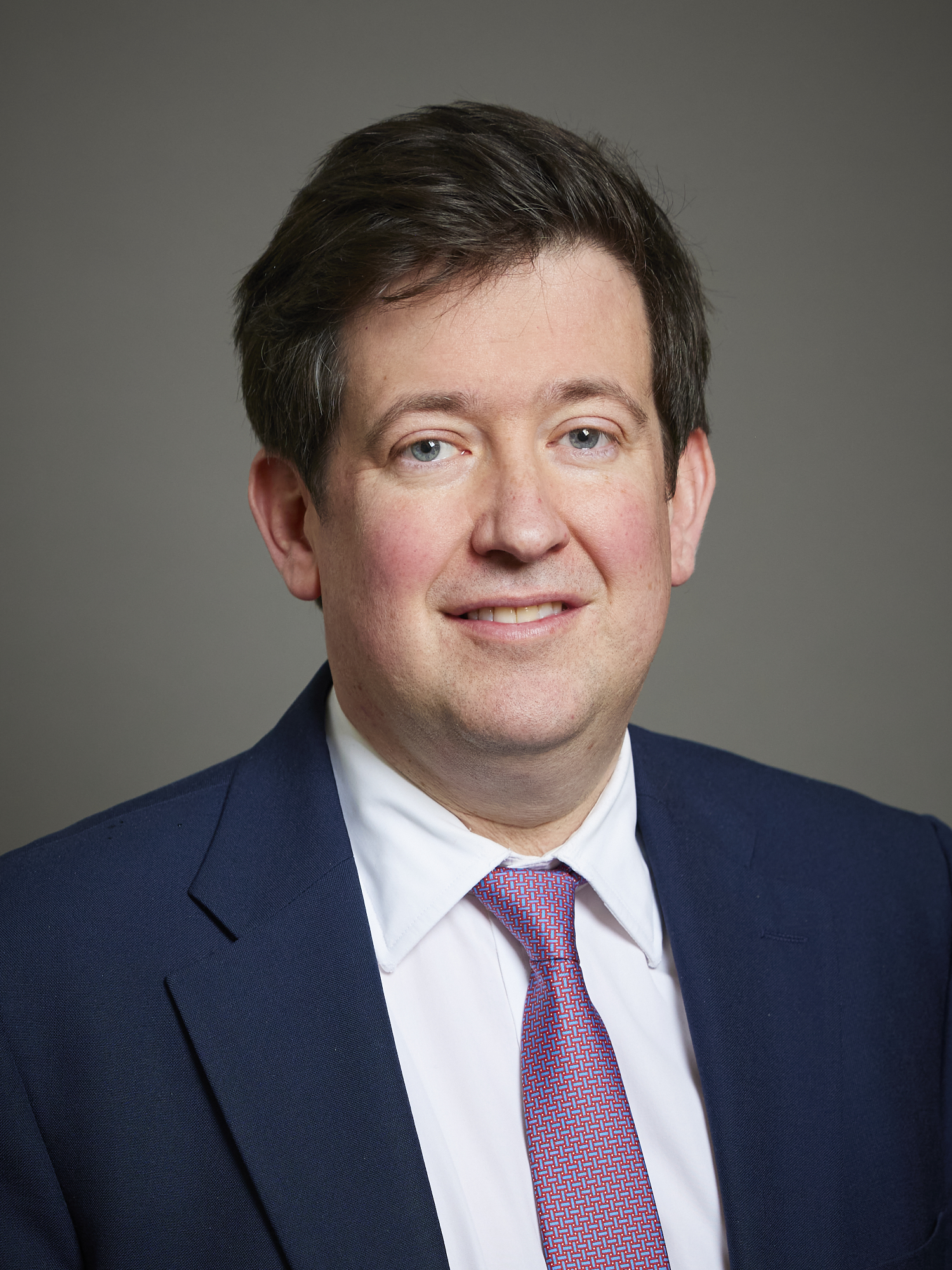
- Official portrait, 2024

Member of the House of Lords
- Lord Temporal
- Life peerage 17 June 2026
- Elected Hereditary Peer; 28 November 2023 – 29 April 2026
- By-election: 2023
- Preceded by: The 5th Baron Brougham and Vaux

Personal details
- Born: Ralph William Robert Stonor; 10 September 1974 (age 52)
- Party: Conservative
- Spouse: Ailsa Fiona Mackay
- Children: 3
- Parent(s): Thomas Stonor, 7th Baron Camoys; Elisabeth Mary Hyde Parker

Ralph William Robert Stonor, 8th Baron Camoys, Baron Stonor (born 10 September 1974), is a British hereditary peer and Conservative member of the House of Lords.

Camoys became a member of the House in November 2023, after winning a hereditary peers' by-election to replace Lord Brougham and Vaux. He was the last person to be elected as an excepted hereditary peer prior to the suspension of hereditary peers' by-elections on 25 July 2024. In May 2026, it was announced that he was to be given one of 26 new life peerages, returning him to the House of Lords after the coming into force of the House of Lords (Hereditary Peers) Act 2026.

The first creation of the Baron Camoys peerage was in 1313 when Ralph de Camoys was summoned to Parliament by writ.

== Early life and education ==
Lord Camoys was born 10 September 1974 to Thomas Stonor, 7th Baron Camoys and Elisabeth Hyde Parker, daughter of Sir William Stephen Hyde-Parker, 11th Baronet. He was educated at Eton College and the University of Manchester, graduating with a BA degree in History.

He is a direct descendant of Thomas de Camoys, 1st Baron Camoys (second creation), who commanded the left wing of the English army at the Battle of Agincourt in 1415. He is a direct descendant of British Prime Minister Robert Peel whose daughter Eliza married The Hon. Francis Stonor. He is a descendant of Nicholas Brown, after whom Brown University in Rhode Island in the United States was named.

Through his mother he is a descendant of Admiral Sir Hyde Parker, who broke the defences of North River in New York in 1776 as captain of HMS Phoenix and later commanded the Battle of Copenhagen with Vice-Admiral Sir Horatio Nelson as his second-in-command.

== Career ==
After graduation, Lord Camoys worked in London and Bristol for private equity firm 3i plc before joining the Foreign Office as a diplomat, where he worked on Afghanistan and Iran in the Middle East Department, in New Delhi and in London as leader of a counter-terrorism team. In 2009, he founded Ilex Partners International Limited, a mergers and acquisitions company focused on Asian markets, with Lord Rothschild. He lived in China from 2010 to 2016.

In 2021, Lord Camoys co-founded Marlow Studios, a new $1bn 1.5m sq.ft technology, media and creative campus located in Marlow, South Buckinghamshire.

He is a Trustee and Director of the Wormsley Estate, the Getty family private residence in South Buckinghamshire.

He is a Member of the Livery of The Fishmongers Company.

He is the UK Chairman of Nepal Nature Trust, a UK charity supporting nature conservation in Nepal, and a Member of the Governing Board of Trustees of Nepal’s National Trust for Nature Conservation.

He is a member of the Thames and Chilterns Regional Committee of Historic Houses.

Lord Camoys was elected a Steward of Henley Royal Regatta in 2024.

== Marriage and family life ==
Stonor married Lady Ailsa Fiona Mackay, daughter of Peter Mackay, 4th Earl of Inchcape in 2004. They have three children.

Lord Camoys' ancestral home is Stonor Park, Henley-on-Thames, Oxfordshire.

Parliament of the United Kingdom
Preceded by The Lord Brougham and Vaux	Elected hereditary peer to the House of Lords under the House of Lords Act 1999; 2023–2026	Position abolished under the House of Lords (Hereditary Peers) Act 2026
Peerage of England
Preceded by Thomas Stonor	Baron Camoys; 2023–present	Incumbent
