= Richard Gilbey, 12th Baron Vaux of Harrowden =

British peer

The Right Honourable The Lord Vaux of Harrowden
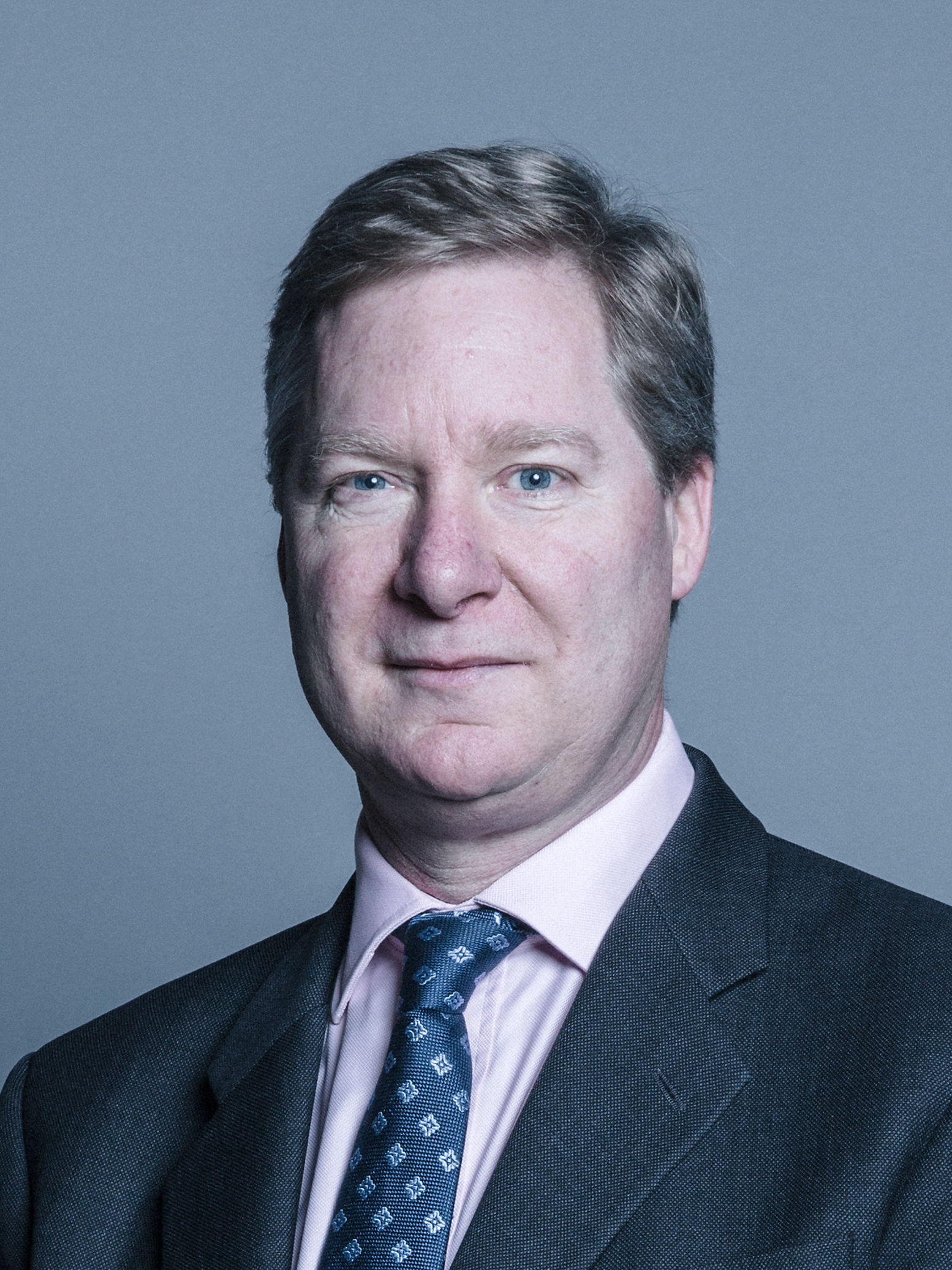
- Official parliamentary portrait, 2017

Member of the House of Lords Lord Temporal
- Incumbent
- Life peerage 10 June 2026
- Elected Hereditary Peer; 11 August 2017 – 29 April 2026
- By-election: 2017
- Preceded by: The 10th Baron Walpole
- Succeeded by: Seat abolished

Personal details
- Born: Richard Hubert Gordon Gilbey; 16 March 1965 (age 61)
- Party: Crossbench

Richard Hubert Gordon Gilbey, 12th Baron Vaux of Harrowden, Baron Gilbey (born 16 March 1965), is a British hereditary peerand a member of the House of Lords who sits as a crossbencher.

He was elected to sit in the House at a crossbench hereditary peers' by-election in July 2017, in place of Lord Walpole who retired in June 2017. He made his maiden speech on 17 October 2017 concerning the impact of Brexit on agriculture in Scotland. In May 2026, it was announced that he was to be given one of 26 new life peerages, returning him to the House of Lords after the coming into force of the House of Lords (Hereditary Peers) Act 2026.

He is a member of the Financial Services Regulation Committee and the Restoration and Renewal Programme Board. He was chair of the Finance Committee from January 2021 to January 2024. He has made many interventions and speeches on bills relating to corporate regulation, including in particular the Economic Crime and Corporate Transparency Bill, the Data Protection and Digital Information Bill, and the Financial Services and Markets Bill.

He originally qualified as a chartered accountant and was Managing Director, Corporate Development for Sungard Data Systems from 2003 to 2016. He succeeded to the title on the death of his father, Anthony, the 11th Baron, in 2014, and inherited the family seat, Rusko, near Gatehouse of Fleet, in the county of Kirkcudbrightshire.

Peerage of England
Preceded by Anthony Gilbey	Baron Vaux of Harrowden; 2014–present	Incumbent heir apparent: Hon. Alexander Gilbey
Parliament of the United Kingdom
Preceded by The Lord Walpole	Elected hereditary peer to the House of Lords under the House of Lords Act 1999; 2017–2026	Position abolished under the House of Lords (Hereditary Peers) Act 2026
