= Richard Denison, 9th Baron Londesborough =

English entrepreneur

The Right Honourable The Lord Londesborough
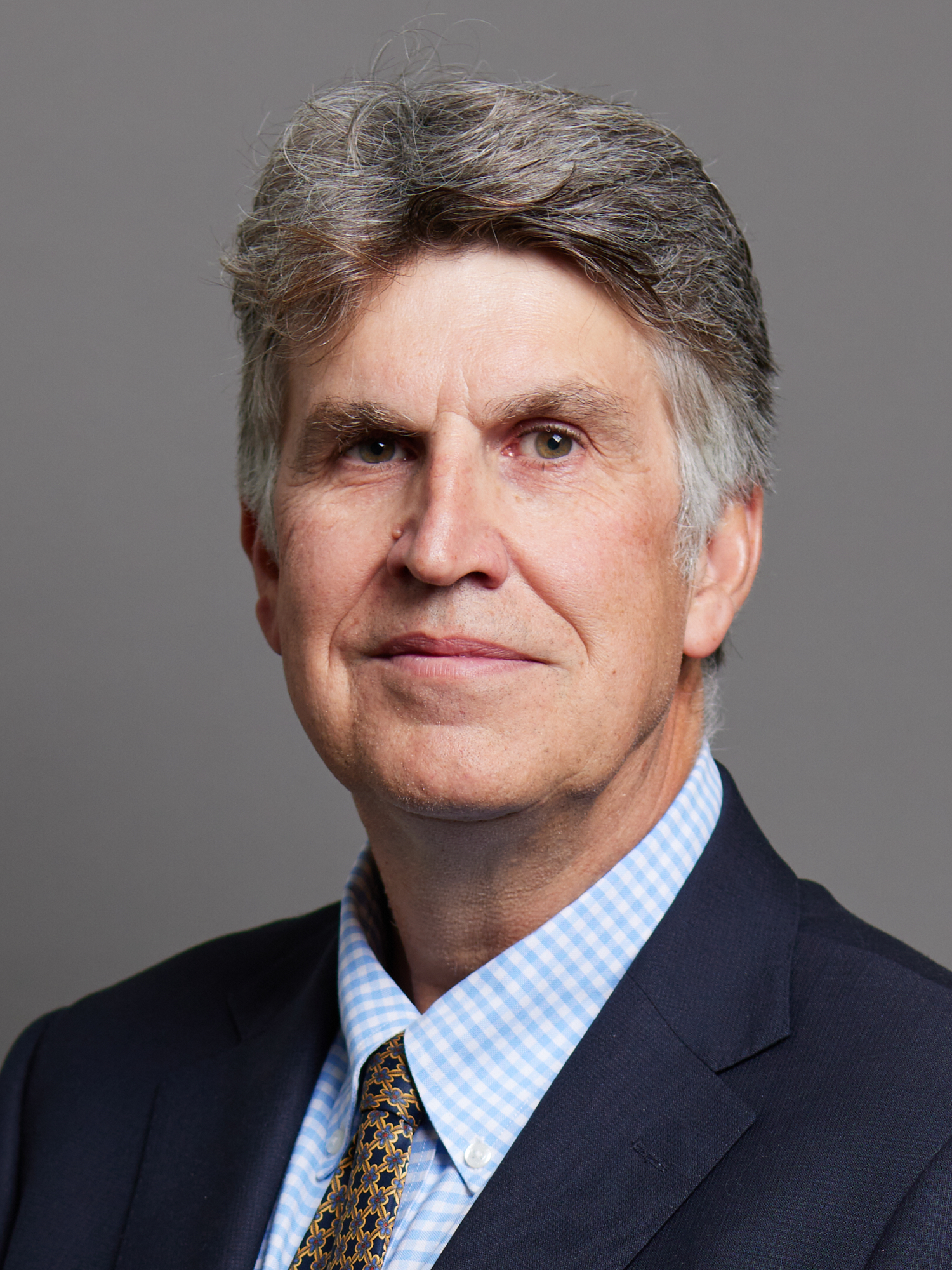
- Official portrait, 2021

Member of the House of Lords Lord Temporal
- Incumbent
- Life peerage 16 June 2026
- Elected Hereditary Peer; 23 June 2021 – 29 April 2026
- By-election: 2021
- Preceded by: The 31st Countess of Mar
- Succeeded by: Seat abolished
- Hereditary peerage 8 April 1996 – 11 November 1999
- Preceded by: The 8th Baron Londesborough
- Succeeded by: Seat abolished

Personal details
- Born: Richard John Denison; 2 July 1959 (age 67)
- Party: None (crossbench)

Richard John Denison, 9th Baron Londesborough, Baron Londesborough of Richmond Hill (born 2 July 1959), is an entrepreneur, investor in start-ups and Crossbench member of the House of Lords.

In May 2026, it was announced he was to be given one of 26 new life peerages, returning him to the House of Lords after the coming into force of the House of Lords (Hereditary Peers) Act 2026.

== Early life ==
Londesborough was a journalist and foreign correspondent in Iran (1978) and Mexico (1982) before setting up from his kitchen table a specialist informational service, Latin America Monitor, with fellow journalist Jonathan Feroze in 1984.

Londesborough and Feroze built up the company (rebranded BMI Research in 1991) into a global country risk platform, employing 300 staff across five continents, with the backing in 2009 of Boston-based Spectrum Equity Partners. They sold the company in 2014 to the Fitch Group.

They set up Sevenex Capital Partners in 2015, providing early stage equity to entrepreneurs across a range of sectors, including B2B media, film, theatre, food & drink, pet care and fintech – including the Social Value Portal, FX Loop, Borrowmydoggy, Loving Vincent and Wipers Times.

Londesborough also became Chairman of information provider Tussell Limited in 2021.

== Political career ==
Londesborough took his seat as a crossbench member of the House of Lords in 1999, and made his maiden/valedictory speech just one week before being excluded by the House of Lords Act 1999.

He became a member of the Lords again in June 2021, having been elected by the whole House in a by-election following the retirement of the Countess of Mar. After a gap of 22 years, Lord Londesborough spoke again in the Lords, touching on his first maiden speech and foreign aid on 27 October 2021.

He spoke regularly on the economy, business, entrepreneurship, sport and small and medium enterprises, and was appointed to the House of Lords Economic Affairs Committee in 2023.

He caused controversy in 2023 during a debate on artificial intelligence, by raising the prospect that members of the House of Lords might be replaced by "peerbots with deeper knowledge, higher productivity and lower running costs."

== Personal life ==
Londesborough married Rikki (née Morris) in 1987. They have a son and a daughter, and live on Richmond Hill in west London.

== Notes ==
Peerage of the United Kingdom
Preceded by John Denison	Baron Londesborough; 1968–present Member of the House of Lords (1996–1999)	Incumbent; Heir apparent: Hon. James Denison
Parliament of the United Kingdom
Preceded by The Countess of Mar	Elected hereditary peer to the House of Lords under the House of Lords Act 1999; 2021–2026	Position abolished under the House of Lords (Hereditary Peers) Act 2026
