= Anthony St John, 22nd Baron St John of Bletso =

British peer (born 1957)

The Right Honourable The Lord St John of Bletso
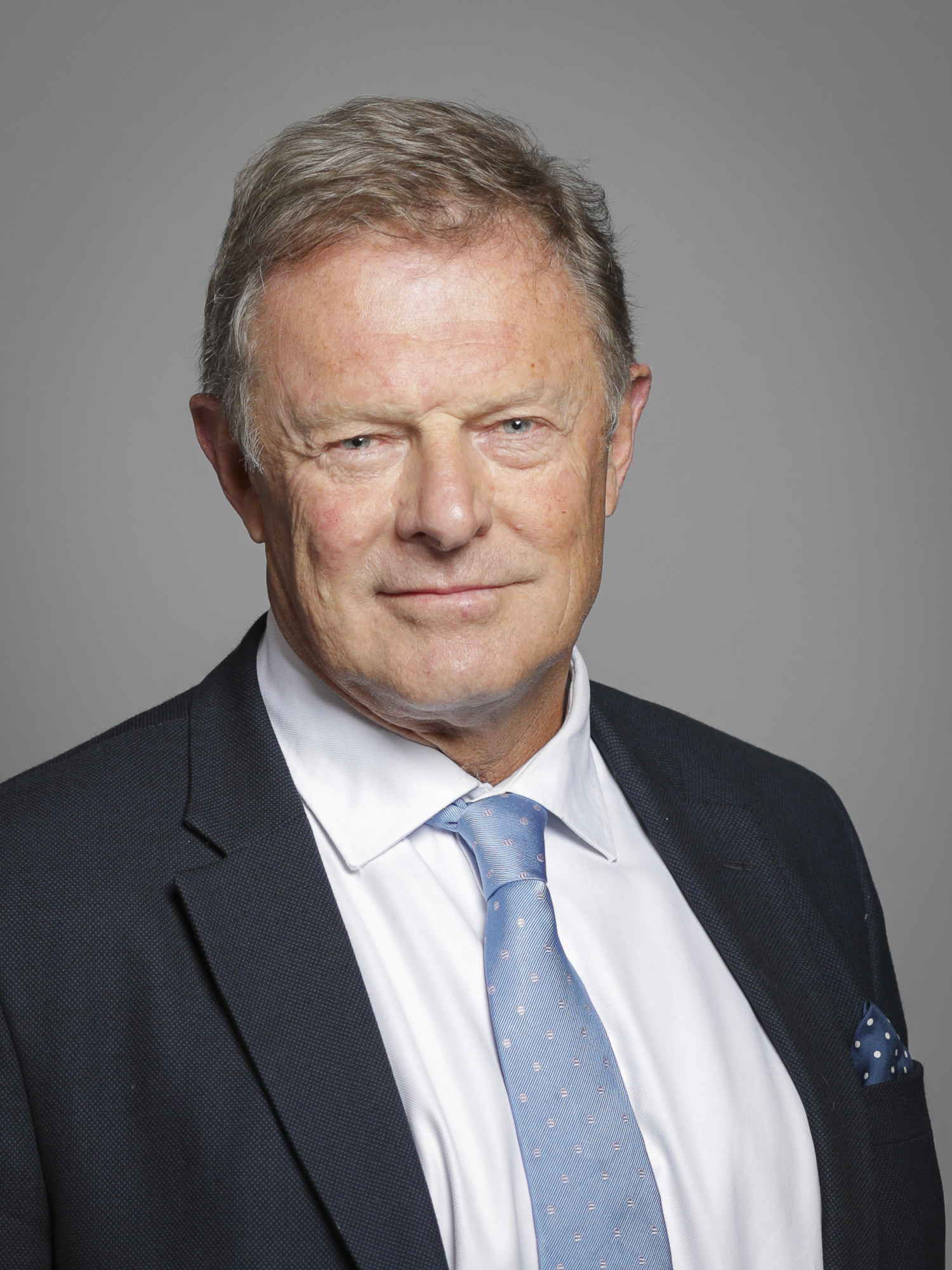

Member of the House of Lords
- Lord Temporal
- Hereditary peerage 8 June 1978 – 11 November 1999
- Preceded by: The 21st Baron St John of Bletso
- Succeeded by: Seat abolished
- Elected Hereditary Peer; 11 November 1999 – 27 March 2026
- Election: 1999
- Preceded by: Seat established
- Succeeded by: Seat abolished

Personal details
- Born: 16 May 1957 (age 69)
- Party: Crossbench

Anthony Tudor St John, 22nd Baron St John of Bletso (born 16 May 1957) is a British peer, politician, businessman and solicitor. He was one of the ninety hereditary peers elected to remain in the House of Lords after the House of Lords Act 1999 until the House of Lords (Hereditary Peers) Act 2026. He spoke on African affairs (and is a notable expert on Southern Africa), deregulation, financial services and information technology. Rather than aligning with a particular political party, he remained a crossbencher.

== Life and career ==
The only son of Andrew St John, 21st Baron St John of Bletso, he was educated in South Africa at Bishops Diocesan College and the University of Cape Town, where he graduated as a Bachelor of Arts and Bachelor of Science, and at the University of South Africa, where he graduated as a Bachelor of Laws.

He succeeded to his father's peerage in 1978, taking his seat in the House of Lords in 1979. He continued his education at the London School of Economics and received a Master of Laws degree.

Between 1985 and 2002, St John worked as an oil analyst at County NatWest Securities and then Smith New Court Plc and thereafter served as a consultant to Merrill Lynch until 2008. He built up the Internet Datacentre business of Globix Corporation in the UK and then became President of Global Sales and Marketing for the International Group. Between 2004 and 2012, he was Non-Executive Chairman of Spiritel Plc, a telecommunications service provider and served as a Non-Executive Director at Sharp Interpak, WMRC and Pecaso. He has also been on the advisory board of Infinity SDC and Chayton Capital with the focus on agriculture and business opportunities in Africa. His company, African Business Solutions, assists International companies seeking to invest in Africa specifically in infrastructure, broadband, financial services and renewable energy. He currently serves as chairman and Non-Executive Director of several listed and un-listed companies, including Yellow Cake plc.

Since 1998, Lord St John has served as an extra Lord-in-Waiting to HM The Queen. He has recently served on the House of Lords Communications Select Committee and the Ad hoc select committee on artificial intelligence. He is currently Vice Chairman of the All Party Parliamentary Africa Group, Zimbabwe group and South Africa group as well as the endangered species group. He served as chairman of the charity, Citizens Online from 2001 to 2008. He is currently a trustee of Christel House Europe and trustee emeritus of Alexandra Rose Charities, Tusk Trust and Television Trust for the environment.

His special interests are foreign affairs, particularly Africa, clean technology, wildlife conservation and sport. He plays a proactive role in the charitable sector, as a trustee of 7 charities mostly focused on poverty reduction, education and wildlife conservation in Southern Africa.

== Personal life ==
St John married firstly Dr Helen Jane Westlake, they have three children

- Oliver Beauchamp St John (1995)
- Alexander Andrew St John (1996)
- Athene Emma St John (1998)

St John married secondly Sabina St John, and they have 5 children between them.

== Notes ==
Peerage of England
Preceded by Andrew St John	Baron St John of Bletso; 1978–present Member of the House of Lords (1978–1999)	Incumbent; Heir: Oliver Beauchamp St. John
Parliament of the United Kingdom
New office created by the House of Lords Act 1999	Elected hereditary peer to the House of Lords under the House of Lords Act 1999; 1999–present 2026	Office abolished under the House of Lords (Hereditary Peers) Act 2026
