= Massey Lopes, 4th Baron Roborough =

British hereditary peer

The Right Honourable The Lord Roborough
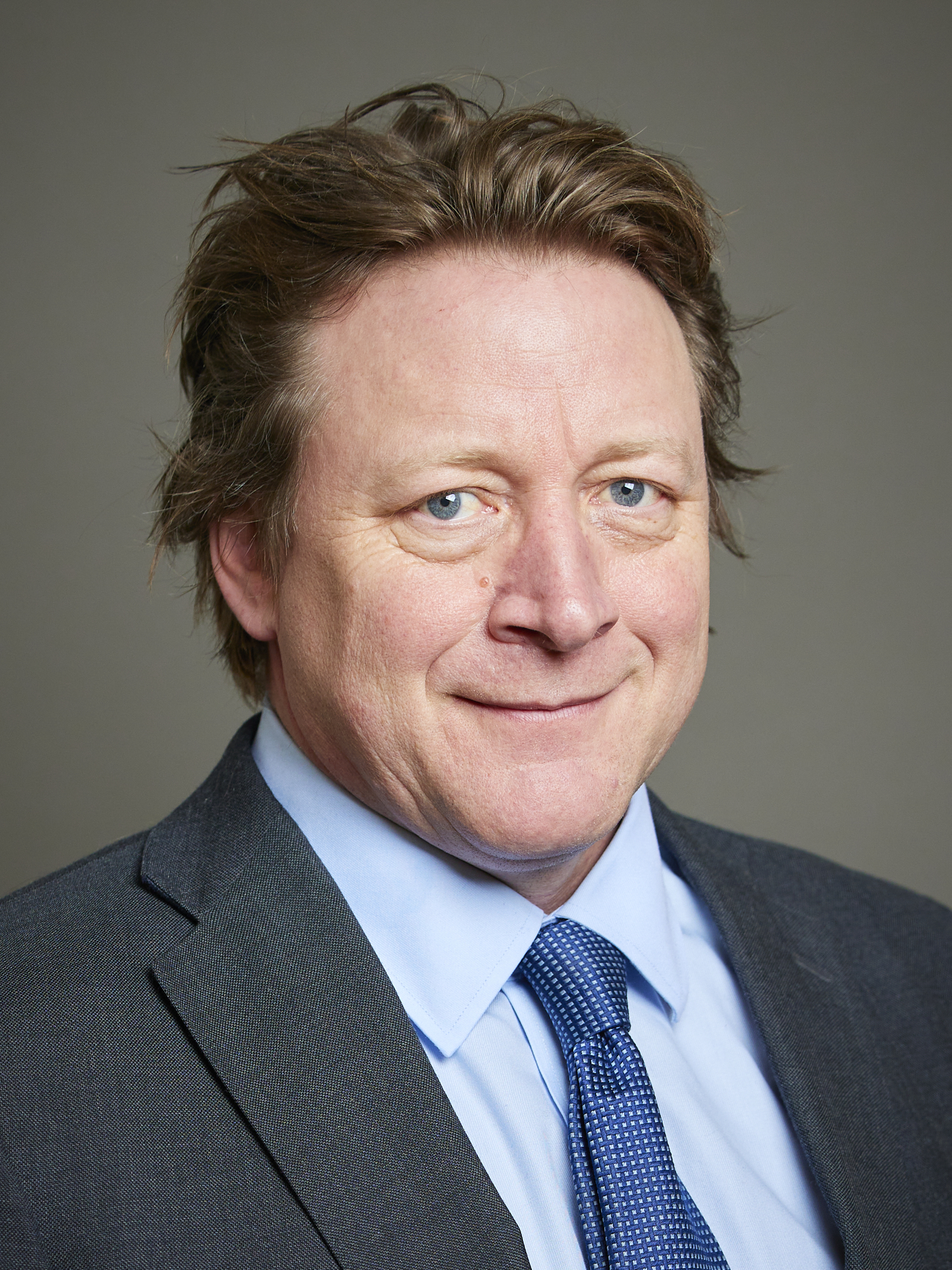
- Official portrait, 2023

Shadow Minister for Environment, Food and Rural Affairs
- Incumbent
- Assumed office 1 September 2024 Serving with Lord Blencathra; Neil Hudson; Robbie Moore
- Leader: Rishi Sunak; Kemi Badenoch

Lord-in-waiting Government Whip
- In office 1 December 2023 – 5 July 2024
- Prime Minister: Rishi Sunak

Member of the House of Lords Lord Temporal
- Incumbent
- Life peerage 10 June 2026
- Elected Hereditary Peer; 25 October 2022 – 29 April 2026
- By-election: 18 October 2022
- Preceded by: The 2nd Viscount Ullswater
- Succeeded by: Seat abolished

Personal details
- Born: Massey John Henry Lopes; 22 December 1969 (age 56)
- Party: Conservative
- Parent(s): Henry Massey Lopes, 3rd Baron Roborough

Massey John Henry Lopes, 4th Baron Roborough, Baron Lopes (born 22 December 1969) is a British hereditary peer and Conservative member of the House of Lords.

Roborough became a member of the House in October 2022, after being one of the two winners in a hereditary peers' by-election to replace both the Viscount Ullswater and the Lord Colwyn.

According to his candidate statement, Roborough had spent his career in investment banking and management; he is married with five children and divides his time between London and Devon.

In May 2026, it was announced that he was to be given one of 26 new life peerages, returning him to the House of Lords after the coming into force of the House of Lords (Hereditary Peers) Act 2026. He was reintroduced to the House as Baron Lopes, of Ditsworthy in the County of Devon on 10 June 2026.

Parliament of the United Kingdom
| Preceded by The Viscount Ullswater | Elected hereditary peer to the House of Lords under the House of Lords Act 1999; 2022–2026 | Position abolished under the House of Lords (Hereditary Peers) Act 2026 |
Peerage of the United Kingdom
| Preceded by Henry Lopes | Baron Roborough; 2015–present | Incumbent |
