= Patrick Stopford, 9th Earl of Courtown =

Irish peer and politician (born 1954)

The Right Honourable The Earl of Courtown
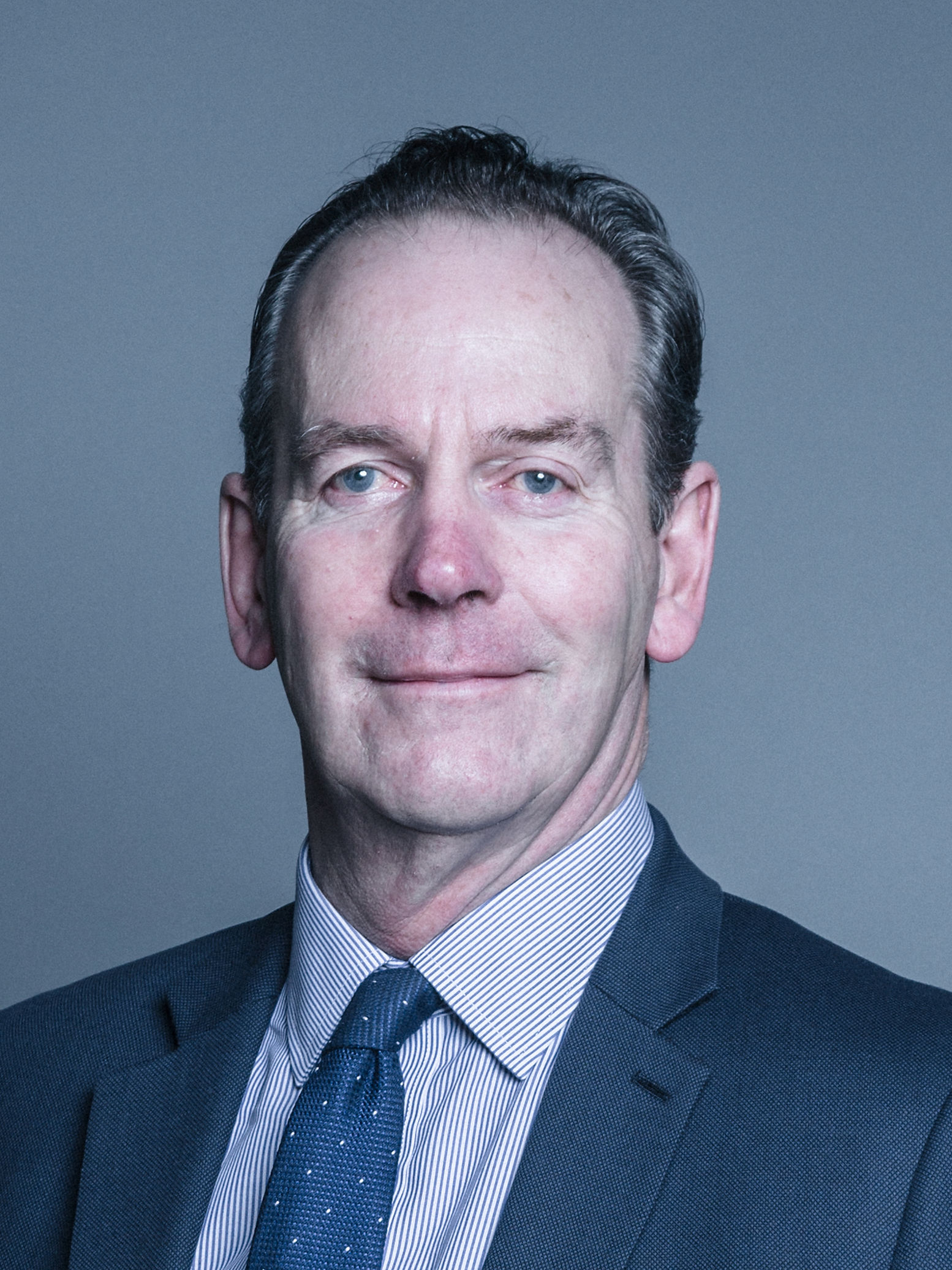
- Official portrait, 2018

Government Deputy Chief Whip in the House of Lords Captain of the Yeomen of the Guard
- In office 13 July 2016 – 5 July 2024
- Prime Minister: Theresa May; Boris Johnson; Liz Truss; Rishi Sunak
- Preceded by: The Lord Gardiner of Kimble
- Succeeded by: The Baroness Wheeler

Lord-in-waiting Government Whip
- In office 8 May 2015 – 13 July 2016
- Prime Minister: David Cameron
- Preceded by: The Lord Popat of Harrow
- Succeeded by: The Lord Young of Cookham
- In office 8 July 1995 – 2 May 1997
- Prime Minister: John Major
- Preceded by: The Earl of Lindsay
- Succeeded by: The Lord Hoyle

Member of the House of Lords Lord Temporal
- Incumbent
- Life peerage 11 June 2026
- Elected Hereditary Peer; 11 November 1999 – 29 April 2026
- Election: 1999
- Preceded by: Seat established
- Succeeded by: Seat abolished
- Hereditary peerage 24 July 1979 – 11 November 1999
- Preceded by: The 8th Earl of Courtown
- Succeeded by: Seat abolished

Personal details
- Born: James Patrick Montagu Burgoyne Winthrop Stopford; 19 March 1954 (age 72)
- Party: Conservative
- Spouse: Elisabeth Dunnett (m. 1985)
- Children: James Stopford, Viscount Stopford
- Education: Eton College; Berkshire College of Agriculture

James Patrick Montagu Burgoyne Winthrop Stopford, 9th Earl of Courtown, Baron Stopford of Saltersford (also known as Patrick Courtown; born 19 March 1954), styled Viscount Stopford between 1957 and 1975, is an Irish peer and politician. He was one of the 92 hereditary peers elected to remain in the House of Lords after the House of Lords Act 1999 and continued to sit for the Conservatives. In May 2026, it was announced that he was to be given one of 26 new life peerages, returning him to the House of Lords after the coming into force of the House of Lords (Hereditary Peers) Act 2026.He is currently the longest serving member of lords.

The elder son of James Stopford, 8th Earl of Courtown and Patricia Winthrop, he has a brother named Jeremy, and three sisters: Elizabeth, Mary and Felicity. He was educated at Eton and at the Berkshire College of Agriculture. He later attended the Royal Agricultural College in Cirencester. He succeeded to the earldom of Courtown in 1975. In 1985, he married Elisabeth Dunnett, daughter of Ian Rodger Dunnett.

The Earl took his seat in the House of Lords in 1979. In 1995, he was appointed a lord-in-waiting to Queen Elizabeth II, and a government whip. He was a government spokesman for the Home Office, Department of Transport and the Scottish Office. In 2013 he was appointed a Conservative party whip. Following the 2015 election, he joined the government, again as a lord-in-waiting and as a government whip. He was promoted to deputy chief whip and captain of the yeomen of the guard in the May ministry in July 2016. In that role, he took part in the Royal Procession at the Coronation of Charles III and Camilla.

The Courtown ancestral home, Courtown House, was demolished in the 1960s, but the Earl visited its location in 2010, with members of his family, and unveiled a plaque in memory of his father at the local church.

The Earl's heir apparent is his son, James.

== Sources ==
- "DodOnline". Archived from the original on 7 December 2006.

Political offices
Preceded by The Lord Gardiner of Kimble	Deputy Government Chief Whip in the House of Lords; 2016–2024	Succeeded by The Baroness Wheeler
Preceded by The Lord Gardiner of Kimble	Captain of the Yeomen of the Guard; 2016–2024	Succeeded by The Baroness Wheeler
Peerage of Ireland
Preceded by James Stopford	Earl of Courtown; 1975–present	Incumbent; Heir apparent: James Stopford, Viscount Stopford
Peerage of Great Britain
Preceded by James Stopford	Baron Saltersford; 1975–present Member of the House of Lords (1975–1999)	Incumbent; Heir apparent: James Stopford, Viscount Stopford
Parliament of the United Kingdom
New office created by the House of Lords Act 1999	Elected hereditary peer to the House of Lords under the House of Lords Act 1999; Sitting as Baron Salterford; 1999–2026	Position abolished under the House of Lords (Hereditary Peers) Act 2026
