= Edward Howard, 8th Earl of Effingham =

British politician (born 1971)

The Right Honourable The Earl of Effingham
- Arms

Member of the House of Lords Lord Temporal
- Incumbent
- Life peerage 2 June 2026
- Elected Hereditary Peer; 28 October 2022 – 29 April 2026
- By-election: 2022
- Preceded by: The 3rd Baron Astor of Hever
- Succeeded by: Seat abolished

Personal details
- Born: Edward Mowbray Nicholas Howard; 11 May 1971 (age 55)
- Party: Conservative

Edward Mowbray Nicholas Howard, 8th Earl of Effingham, Baron Effingham of Bookham Commons (born 11 May 1971) is a hereditary peer in the peerage of the United Kingdom and a Conservative member of the House of Lords.

He is also the 18th Baron Howard of Effingham, being a direct descendant of the Elizabethan statesman William Howard, 1st Baron Howard of Effingham.

The only son of David Howard, 7th Earl of Effingham, he was styled as Lord Howard of Effingham from 1996 until inheriting his father’s peerages in February 2022. In October of the same year he was one of the two successful candidates in a Conservative hereditary peers' by-election to replace Lord Astor of Hever and the Earl of Home. In May 2026, it was announced that he was to be given one of 26 new life peerages, returning him to the House of Lords after the coming into force of the House of Lords (Hereditary Peers) Act 2026.

On 5 April 2002, at Lima, Peru, Howard married Tatiana Tafur, and they have two children.

In his candidate statement in support of his election to the Lords, Effingham said in 2022 that he had a degree in Classics from the University of Bristol and had worked in finance at Barclays, advising British companies on foreign exchange and treasury. He described himself as "a proponent of sport for all" and was living and working in London.

Peerage of the United Kingdom
Preceded by David Howard	Earl of Effingham; 2022–present	Incumbent
Parliament of the United Kingdom
Preceded by The Lord Astor of Hever	Elected hereditary peer to the House of Lords under the House of Lords Act 1999; 2022–2026	Position abolished under the House of Lords (Hereditary Peers) Act 2026
