= Margaret Wheeler, Baroness Wheeler =

British life peer (born 1949)

The Right Honourable The Baroness Wheeler MBE
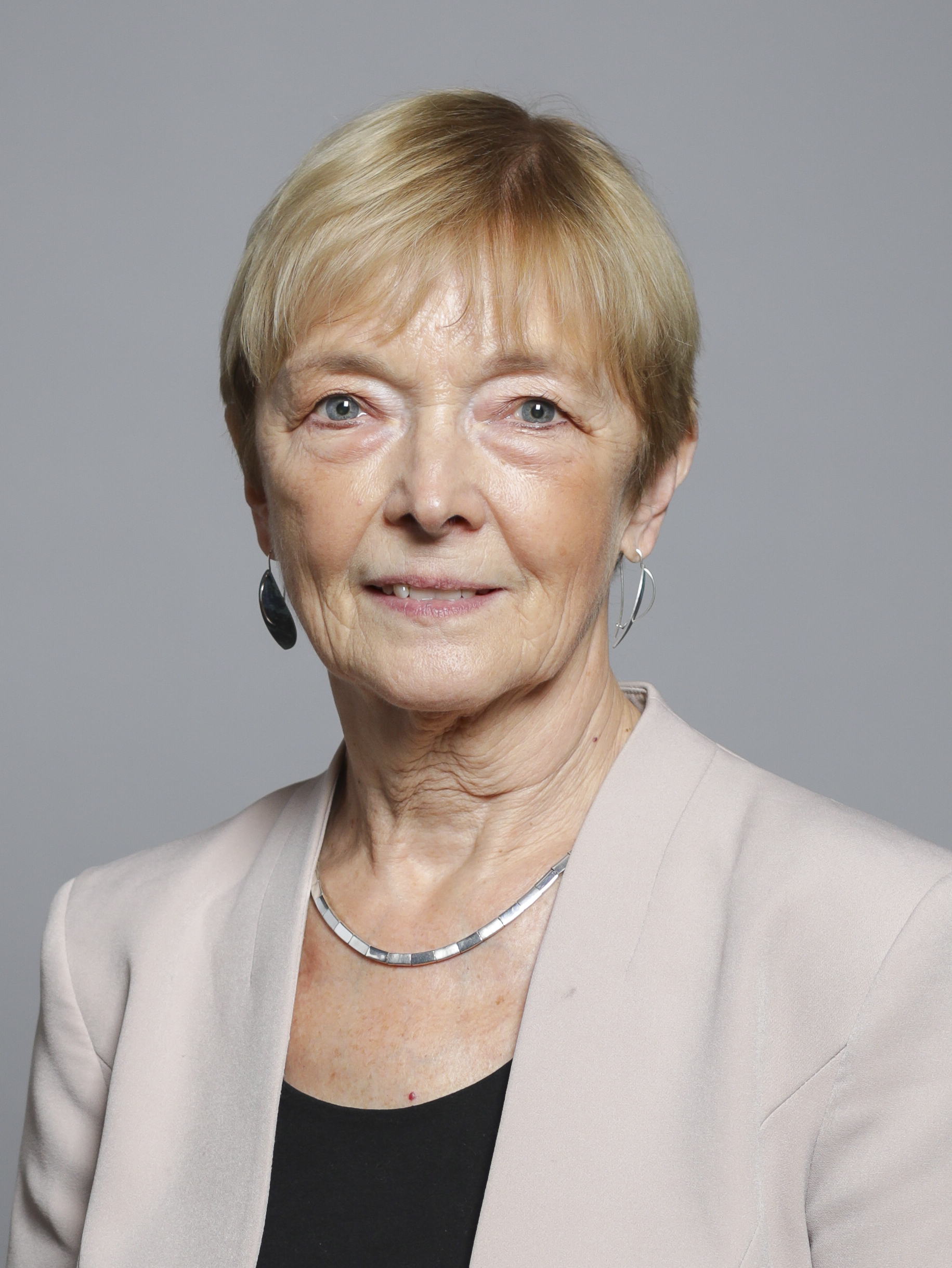
- Official portrait, 2019

Government Deputy Chief Whip in the House of Lords Captain of the Yeomen of the Guard
- In office 10 July 2024 – 22 July 2026
- Prime Minister: Keir Starmer
- Preceded by: The Earl of Courtown
- Succeeded by: The Baroness Anderson of Stoke-on-Trent

Member of the House of Lords
- Lord Temporal
- Life peerage 20 June 2010

Personal details
- Born: 25 March 1949 (age 77)
- Party: Labour

Margaret Eileen Joyce Wheeler, Baroness Wheeler MBE (born 25 March 1949) is a British life peer currently serving as a Labour member of the House of Lords since 2010 and as Government Deputy Chief Whip in the House of Lords since 2024.

In the 2005 Birthday Honours she was appointed a Member of the Order of the British Empire (MBE) for services to Trade Unions.

She was created a life peer on 20 June 2010 taking the title Baroness Wheeler, of Blackfriars in the City of London, and was introduced in the Lords on 14 July 2010.

== Parliamentary career ==
- Government Deputy Chief Whip in the House of Lords (10 July 2024 – 22 July 2026)
- Shadow Spokesperson for Health and Social Care (4 June 2018 – 5 June 2024)
- Opposition Deputy Chief Whip in House of Lords (31 January 2018 – 5 June 2024)
- Opposition Senior Whip in the House of Lords (1 April 2014 – 31 January 2018)
- Opposition Whip in the House of Lords (8 October 2010 – 1 April 2014)

Political offices
Preceded by The Earl of Courtown	Deputy Government Chief Whip in the House of Lords; 2024–2026	Incumbent
Preceded by The Earl of Courtown	Captain of the Yeomen of the Guard; 2024–2026	Incumbent
