= Margaret of Mar, 31st Countess of Mar =

British peer (born 1940)

The Right Honourable The Countess of Mar

Member of the House of Lords
- Lord Temporal
- Hereditary peerage 11 September 1975 – 11 November 1999
- Preceded by: The 30th Earl of Mar
- Succeeded by: Seat abolished
- Elected Hereditary Peer; 11 November 1999 – 1 May 2020
- Election: 1999
- Preceded by: Seat established
- Succeeded by: The 9th Baron Londesborough

Personal details
- Born: Margaret Alison Lane; 19 September 1940 (age 86)
- Party: Crossbench
- Spouses: Edwin Noel Artiss (m. 1959; div. 1976) John Salton (m. 1976; div. 1981) John Jenkin (m. 1982)
- Children: Susan Mar, Mistress of Mar
- Parents: James of Mar, 30th Earl of Mar; Millicent Mary Salton

Margaret of Mar, 31st Countess of Mar (born 19 September 1940), is a Scottish hereditary peer and politician. She was a crossbench member of the House of Lords from 1975 to 2020 and was one of 92 hereditary peers elected to remain in the Lords in 1999. She is the holder of the original earldom of Mar, the oldest peerage title in the United Kingdom. She is the only extant suo jure countess in the United Kingdom, and was the only female hereditary peer in the House of Lords from 2014 to 2020. She is also a farmer and former specialist goats cheesemaker in Great Witley, Worcestershire.

== Early life ==
She was born Margaret Alison Lane, the daughter of Millicent Mary Salton and James Clifton Lane, later James of Mar, 30th Earl of Mar, the heir of Lionel Erskine-Young, 29th Earl of Mar, his first cousin once removed (both were descended from a sister of John Goodeve-Erskine, 27th Earl of Mar).

Margaret had two younger siblings: David of Mar, Master of Mar, and Lady Janet of Mar. In 1959, her father was officially recognised in the style of Mar, and from that year his three children were also styled of Mar, the name Lane being abandoned.

== Career ==
From 1959 to 1962, she was a civil servant with the Ministry of Pensions and National Insurance, before taking a position as a nursing auxiliary at the Bromsgrove Cottage Hospital from 1964 to 1969. She was a sales superintendent for British Telecom between 1969 and 1982, after which she took up farming.

== Mistress of Mar ==
When Margaret's father succeeded as 30th Earl of Mar in 1965 she became Lady Margaret of Mar, and her brother became the Master of Mar, Lord Garioch. When Lord Garioch died in 1967, Margaret became the Mistress of Mar as the elder heir-portioner presumptive in general of her father.

== Countess of Mar ==
When in 1975 her father the 30th Earl died, Lady Margaret became the 31st holder of the Mar earldom, the premier earldom of Scotland, and entered the House of Lords, making her maiden speech in April 1976. After the passing of House of Lords Act 1999, Lady Mar was elected to serve as one of the ninety-two hereditary peers retained in the House, receiving the highest number of votes of all peers. She sat as a crossbencher, meaning she was not aligned with any particular political party. She retired from the House on 1 May 2020 under the House of Lords Reform Act 2014.

Lady Mar held a number of positions within the House of Lords:

- Deputy Chair of Committees 1997–2007
- Select Committee on European Communities Sub-Committee C (Environment, Public Health and Consumer Protection) 1997–1999
- Deputy Speaker 1999–2007, 2009–2012 and 2014–2020
- Select Committee on European Union Sub-Committee D (Environment, Agriculture, Public Health and Consumer Protection / Environment and Agriculture) 2001–2005

Lady Mar was also a member of the Joint Committee on Statutory Instruments, a member of the Lords Refreshment Committee, and a member of the panel of Deputy Chairmen of Committees. Lady Mar was also secretary of the All Party Parliamentary Group on Pesticides and Organophosphates.

Lady Mar has also held a variety of non-political offices:

- Member of the Immigration Appeal Tribunal 1985–2006
- Chairman, Honest Food 2000–2005
- Chairman, Environmental Medicine Foundation 1997–2003
- President, Guild of Agricultural Journalists 2007–2010
- Patron, Dispensing Doctors' Association 1985–1986
- Patron, Worcestor Mobile Disabled Group 1991–2003
- Patron, Gulf Veterans' Association
- President, Elderly Accommodation Counsel, 1994–present
- Honorary Associate of the Royal College of Veterinary Surgeons 2006–present
- Honorary Associate of the British Veterinary Association 2007–present

== Illness ==
In the summer of 1989, while dipping her sheep through a tank of organophosphorous chemicals, Lady Mar was subjected to a splash of chemicals on her foot, and three weeks later developed headaches and muscular pains. She was eventually diagnosed with chronic fatigue syndrome. Since then Lady Mar used her seat in the House of Lords almost exclusively to press the government to provide suitable care and support for patients with similar long-term and poorly understood medical conditions, and to better regulate the use of organophosphates. This also led to her membership on the EU sub-committees listed above.

As a consequence of her illness, Lady Mar founded the organisation Forward-ME to co-ordinate the activities of a fairly broad spectrum of charities and voluntary organisations working with patients with chronic fatigue syndrome, which is also known as myalgic encephalomyelitis (ME).

== Family ==
Lady Mar has married three times: first to Edwin Noel Artiss, then to John Salton, and finally to John Jenkin. From the first marriage she had a daughter: Susan Helen of Mar, Mistress of Mar (born 1963), the heir presumptive to her mother's peerage. Lady Susan is married to Bruce Alexander Wyllie, and has two daughters, Isabel and Frances.

== Arms ==
Coat of arms of Margaret of Mar, 31st Countess of Mar
Coronet A Coronet of an Earl Crest Upon a Chapeau Gules faced Ermine two Wings each of ten Pen Feathers erected and addorsed both blazoned as the Shield Escutcheon Azure a Bend between six Cross Crosslets fitchée Or Supporters On either side a Griffin Argent armed beaked and winged Or Motto Pans Plus (Think more) Badge A Demi-Nobleman bearded proper in robe Gules furred Ermine with a Conical Hat Gules furred Ermine embellished with a Tall Feather Or quilled Azure all within an oval Chaplet of Scots Fir banded of Ribbands Azure and Or and ensigned with the Comital Coronet of Mar

== Bibliography ==
- Burke's Peerage
- Debrett's Peerage
- Extracts of Matriculations of Arms
- dodonline.co.uk
- Lady Mar's record in the House of Lords
- Forward-ME of which Lady Mar is chairman
- Parliamentary contributions by Lady Mar

Peerage of Scotland
Preceded by James of Mar	Countess of Mar; 1975–present Member of the House of Lords (1975–1999)	Incumbent; Heir presumptive: Susan of Mar, Mistress of Mar
Parliament of the United Kingdom
New office created by the House of Lords Act 1999	Elected hereditary peer to the House of Lords under the House of Lords Act 1999; 1999–2020	Succeeded by The Lord Londesborough
