= May 2026 political peerages =

Appointments to UK House of Lords

The May 2026 political peerages were announced on 12 May 2026. A total of 26 individuals who had previously been excepted hereditary peers were to be given life peerages, enabling their return to the House of Lords after they ceased to be members on 29 April 2026 with the coming into force of the House of Lords (Hereditary Peers) Act 2026. Another set of political peerages, none being former hereditary peers, was announced in July.

== Background ==
In negotiations over the House of Lords (Hereditary Peers) bill, it was agreed by the British government that if it was enacted and came into force, an unspecified number of new life peerages would be created for Conservatives and Crossbenchers, allowing some serving hereditary peers to continue as members of the House of Lords. This was announced by Angela Smith, Baroness Smith of Basildon, Leader of the House of Lords, on 10 March 2026, and the Conservatives withdrew their opposition to the bill. The relevant section of the bill came into force upon the end of the session of the Parliament on 29 April 2026, resulting in the exclusion of 77 hereditary peers.

On 12 May 2026 the pending recipients of 26 life peerages were announced; these peerages were created between 1 June and 17 June 2026. This resulted in 15 Conservatives, nine Crossbenchers and two Labour excepted hereditary peers returning to the Lords after a short hiatus. One Crossbench peerage (making ten in total) and two Liberal Democrat peerages had previously been created for existing excepted hereditary peers in the 2025 political peerages list and those peers had continued in the House uninterrupted, along with five other life peers that had also concurrently held a hereditary peerage.

== Life peerages ==
=== Peers nominated by the Leader of the Labour Party ===
- Stephen Benn, 3rd Viscount Stansgate, to be Baron Stansgate of Holland Park, of Stansgate in the County of Essex – 3 June 2026
- John Suenson-Taylor, 3rd Baron Grantchester, to be Baron Grantchester of Audlem, of Nantwich in the County of Cheshire – 15 June 2026

=== Crossbench peers ===
- Charles Wellesley, 9th Duke of Wellington OBE DL, to be Baron Wellington of Stratfield Saye, of Stratfield Saye in the County of Hampshire and of Colmonell in the County of Ayrshire – 1 June 2026
- Nicholas Le Poer Trench, 9th Earl of Clancarty, to be Baron Clancarty of the Hangers, of Petersfield in the County of Hampshire – 4 June 2026
- Charles Colville, 5th Viscount Colville of Culross, to be Baron Colville of Waveney, of Geldeston in the County of Norfolk – 8 June 2026
- Richard Denison, 9th Baron Londesborough, to be Baron Londesborough of Richmond Hill, of Londesborough in the County of Yorkshire – 16 June 2026
- Simon Russell, 3rd Baron Russell of Liverpool, to be Baron Russell of Kiloran, of Colonsay in the County of Argyll – 8 June 2026
- Daniel Mosley, 4th Baron Ravensdale CEng MIMechE, to be Baron Ravensdale of Little Eaton, of Little Eaton in the County of Derbyshire – 12 June 2026
- Godfrey Bewicke-Copley, 7th Baron Cromwell, to be Baron Cromwell of Tattershall, of Misterton in the County of Leicestershire – 1 June 2026
- Richard Gilbey, 12th Baron Vaux of Harrowden, to be Baron Gilbey, of Gatehouse of Fleet in the Stewartry of Kirkcudbright – 10 June 2026
- John Pakington, 7th Baron Hampton, to be Baron Hampton of Newington Green, of Newington Green in the London Borough of Hackney – 9 June 2026

=== Peers nominated by the Leader of the Conservative Party ===
- Sebastian Grigg, 4th Baron Altrincham, to be Baron Altrincham of Islington, of Holland Park in the Royal Borough of Kensington and Chelsea – 2 June 2026
- Mark Cubitt, 5th Baron Ashcombe, to be Baron Ashcombe of Boldre, of Boldre in the County of Hampshire – 11 June 2026
- William Stonor, 8th Baron Camoys, to be Baron Stonor, of Henley-on-Thames in the County of Oxfordshire – 17 June 2026
- Jonathan Berry, 5th Viscount Camrose, to be Baron Berry, of Aldsworth in the County of Gloucestershire – 12 June 2026
- Patrick Stopford, 9th Earl of Courtown, to be Baron Stopford of Saltersford, of Saltersford in the County of Cheshire – 11 June 2026
- Rupert Ponsonby, 7th Baron de Mauley KCVO TD FCA, to be Baron de Mauley of Canford, of Canford in the County of Gloucestershire – 5 June 2026
- Edward Howard, 8th Earl of Effingham, to be Baron Effingham of Bookham Commons, of Effingham in the County of Surrey – 2 June 2026
- Giles Goschen, 4th Viscount Goschen, to be Baron Hawkhurst, of Otterhead in the County of Somerset – 5 June 2026
- Jasset Ormsby-Gore, 7th Baron Harlech, to be Baron Harlech of Glyn Cywarch, of Glyn Cywarch in the County of Merioneth – 16 June 2026
- Frederick Curzon, 7th Earl Howe GBE PC, to be Baron Curzon of Amersham, of Amersham in the County of Buckinghamshire – 9 June 2026
- Timothy Elliot-Murray-Kynynmound, 7th Earl of Minto, to be Baron Minto of Burncrooks, of Minto in the County of Roxburghshire – 17 June 2026
- Colin Moynihan, 4th Baron Moynihan, to be Baron Moynihan of Purbeck, of Leeds in the County of York – 4 June 2026
- Aeneas Mackay, 15th Lord Reay, to be Baron Reay of Reay, of Farr in the County of Sutherland – 15 June 2026
- Massey Lopes, 4th Baron Roborough, to be Baron Lopes, of Ditsworthy in the County of Devon – 10 June 2026
- Thomas Galbraith, 2nd Baron Strathclyde CH PC, to be Baron Strathclyde of Barskimming, of Barskimming in the County of Ayr – 3 June 2026
