= List of excepted hereditary peers =

Between 1999 and 2026, 92 hereditary peers were excepted from the House of Lords Act 1999 to sit in the House of Lords, the upper house of the Parliament of the United Kingdom. Of these, 90 were elected internally by the House, as well as the holders of two royal offices, the Earl Marshal and the Lord Great Chamberlain, who sat ex officio.

The initial cohort of excepted hereditary peers were elected in the 1999 House of Lords elections. Between 1999 and November 2002, vacancies among this group were filled by runners-up in the 1999 election. From 2002 to 2024, by-elections to the House of Lords filled vacancies. From 2024 to 2026, by-elections were paused and 11 vacancies went unfilled.

The electorates were either the whole membership of the House of Lords (including life peers), or a party group of sitting hereditary peers. A standing order of the House, approved prior to the commencement of the House of Lords Act 1999, mandated that the 90 elected hereditary peers consisted of:

- 2 peers elected by the Labour hereditary peers
- 42 peers elected by the Conservative hereditary peers
- 3 peers elected by the Liberal Democrat hereditary peers
- 28 peers elected by the crossbench hereditary peers
- 15 peers elected by the whole House

By convention, whole-House elections elected members of the same affiliation as the departed peer.

These numbers elected by each group reflected the relative strengths of the parties among hereditary peers in 1999; this allocation remained unchanged.

Candidature for both the 1999 elections and subsequent by-elections were restricted to peers in the Peerages of England, Scotland, Great Britain and the United Kingdom. Peers in the Peerage of Ireland were only eligible for election if they held a title in one of the other peerages, but if successful they could use their Irish peerage title as a member of the House.

A small number of hereditary peers have sat in the Lords by virtue of their being granted life peerages (see listing) without having been excepted hereditary peers. These are not listed below.

The House of Lords (Hereditary Peers) Act 2026, which excluded the hereditary peers from the House at the end of the 2024–2026 parliamentary session, was passed in March 2026 after a compromise with the Conservative party which would allow some of their hereditary peers as well as some crossbench hereditary peers to remain in the house as life peers.

== Ex officio members ==
=== Earl Marshal ===
The Earl Marshal is an hereditary post held by the Duke of Norfolk.

Hereditary peer and title used in the Lords	Tenure	
Miles Fitzalan-Howard, 17th Duke of Norfolk	31 January 1975	24 June 2002
Edward Fitzalan-Howard, 18th Duke of Norfolk; Excluded from the House of Lords on 29 April 2026	24 June 2002	present

=== Lord Great Chamberlain ===
The Lord Great Chamberlain is an hereditary office in gross post among the Cholmondeley, Heathcote-Drummond-Willoughby and Carington families.

In 1902 it was ruled by the House of Lords that the then joint office holders (the 1st Earl of Ancaster, the 4th Marquess of Cholmondeley, and the Earl Carrington, later Marquess of Lincolnshire) had to agree on a deputy to exercise the office, subject to the approval of the Sovereign. Should there be no such agreement, the Sovereign should appoint a deputy until an agreement be reached.

In 1912 an agreement was reached. The office, or right to appoint the person to exercise the office, would thereafter rotate among the three joint office holders and their heirs after them, changing at the start of each successive reign. Cholmondeley and his heirs would serve in every other reign; Ancaster and Carrington would each serve once in four reigns.

Hereditary peer and title used in the Lords	Tenure	
David Cholmondeley, 7th Marquess of Cholmondeley	13 March 1990	8 September 2022
Rupert Carington, 7th Baron Carrington; Elected as an excepted hereditary peer in 2018; Excluded from the House of Lords on 29 April 2026	8 September 2022	present

== Elected by the whole House ==
Hereditary peer and title used in the Lords	Party	First sat	Elected	Replacing	Left House	Died
David Kenworthy, 11th Baron Strabolgi	Labour	1953	28 October 1999		24 December 2010^{D}	24 December 2010
Morys Bruce, 4th Baron Aberdare	Conservative	1957	28 October 1999		23 January 2005^{D}	23 January 2005
Charles Lyell, 3rd Baron Lyell	Conservative	1960	28 October 1999		11 January 2017^{D}	11 January 2017
Hugh Mackay, 14th Lord Reay	Conservative	1964	28 October 1999		10 May 2013^{D}	10 May 2013
Anthony Hamilton-Smith, 3rd Baron Colwyn	Conservative	1967	28 October 1999		21 July 2022^{R}	4 August 2024
Michael Brougham, 5th Baron Brougham and Vaux	Conservative	1968	28 October 1999		27 August 2023^{D}	27 August 2023
Rodney Elton, 2nd Baron Elton	Conservative	1973	28 October 1999		29 October 2020^{R}	19 August 2023
Roger Bootle-Wilbraham, 7th Baron Skelmersdale	Conservative	1974	28 October 1999		31 October 2018^{D}	31 October 2018
Euan Geddes, 3rd Baron Geddes	Conservative	1975	28 October 1999		29 April 2026^{E}	
Margaret of Mar, 31st Countess of Mar	Crossbencher	1975	28 October 1999		1 May 2020^{R}	
Geoffrey Russell, 4th Baron Ampthill	Crossbencher	1976	28 October 1999		23 April 2011^{D}	23 April 2011
Lucius Cary, 15th Viscount Falkland (Note: Elected as Liberal Democrat, joined Crossbench in 2011)	Crossbencher	1984	28 October 1999		21 March 2023^{R}	
George Makgill, 13th Viscount of Oxfuird	Conservative	1987	28 October 1999		3 January 2003^{D}	3 January 2003
Jan David Simon, 3rd Viscount Simon	Labour	1994	28 October 1999		15 August 2021^{D}	15 August 2021
Robert Methuen, 7th Baron Methuen	Liberal Democrats	1994	28 October 1999		9 July 2014^{D}	9 July 2014
Nicholas Lowther, 2nd Viscount Ullswater	Conservative	1963^{L}	26 March 2003	George Makgill, 13th Viscount of Oxfuird	20 July 2022^{R}	
John Eccles, 2nd Viscount Eccles	Conservative	1999^{L}	22 March 2005	Morys Bruce, 4th Baron Aberdare	29 April 2026^{E}	
David Pollock, 3rd Viscount Hanworth	Labour	1996^{L}	22 March 2011	David Kenworthy, 11th Baron Strabolgi	29 April 2026^{E}	
Charles Colville, 5th Viscount Colville of Culross	Crossbencher	2011	20 July 2011	Geoffrey Russell, 4th Baron Ampthill	29 April 2026^{E}	
Jamie Borwick, 5th Baron Borwick	Conservative	2013	16 July 2013	Hugh Mackay, 14th Lord Reay	29 April 2026^{E}	
Raymond Asquith, 3rd Earl of Oxford and Asquith (Note: Elected as Liberal Democrat; became non-affiliated in 2019, Crossbencher in 2021)	Crossbencher	2014	21 October 2014	Robert Methuen, 7th Baron Methuen	29 April 2026^{E}	
Alastair Campbell, 4th Baron Colgrain	Conservative	2017	21 March 2017	Charles Lyell, 3rd Baron Lyell	29 April 2026^{E}	
Aeneas Mackay, 15th Lord Reay	Conservative	2019	22 January 2019	Roger Bootle-Wilbraham, 7th Baron Skelmersdale	29 April 2026^{E}	
Richard Denison, 9th Baron Londesborough	Crossbencher	1996^{L}	16 June 2021	Margaret of Mar, 31st Countess of Mar	29 April 2026^{E}	
Jasset Ormsby-Gore, 7th Baron Harlech	Conservative	2021	14 July 2021	Rodney Elton, 2nd Baron Elton	29 April 2026^{E}	
David Hacking, 3rd Baron Hacking	Labour	1971^{L}	10 November 2021	Jan David Simon, 3rd Viscount Simon	29 April 2026^{E}	
Massey Lopes, 4th Baron Roborough	Conservative	2022	18 October 2022	Nicholas Lowther, 2nd Viscount Ullswater	29 April 2026^{E}	
Timothy Elliot-Murray-Kynynmound, 7th Earl of Minto	Conservative	2022	18 October 2022	Anthony Hamilton-Smith, 3rd Baron Colwyn	29 April 2026^{E}	
John Russell, 7th Earl Russell	Liberal Democrat	2023	13 June 2023	Lucius Cary, 15th Viscount Falkland	Sitting as life peer (Note: Ceased to sit as an excepted hereditary peer on 29 April 2026; however, had held a life peerage—Baron Russell of Forest Hill—since 30 March 2026 and therefore continued to sit in the House of Lords without interruption.)	
William Stonor, 8th Baron Camoys	Conservative	2023	22 November 2023	Michael Brougham, 5th Baron Brougham and Vaux	29 April 2026^{E}	

Key

^L Left the house in 1999 then subsequently rejoined by filling a vacancy
^D Died while a sitting member
^R Resigned pursuant to section 1 of House of Lords Reform Act 2014
^NA Removed for non-attendance pursuant to section 2 of House of Lords Reform Act 2014
^E Excluded pursuant to section 1 of the House of Lords (Hereditary Peers) Act 2026

Remarks

== Elected by the Conservative hereditary peers ==
Hereditary peer and title used in the Lords	First sat	Elected	Replacing	Left House	Died
Edward Douglas-Scott-Montagu, 3rd Baron Montagu of Beaulieu	1947	4 November 1999		31 August 2015^{D}	31 August 2015
Bertram Bowyer, 2nd Baron Denham	1949	4 November 1999		26 April 2021^{R}	1 December 2021
Robert Shirley, 13th Earl Ferrers	1955	4 November 1999		13 November 2012^{D}	13 November 2012
David Trefgarne, 2nd Baron Trefgarne	1962	4 November 1999		27 March 2026^{R}	
Malcolm Mitchell-Thomson, 3rd Baron Selsdon	1963	4 November 1999		11 May 2021^{NA}	18 September 2024
Charles Stourton, 26th Baron Mowbray	1965	4 November 1999		12 December 2006^{D}	12 December 2006
Edward Foljambe, 5th Earl of Liverpool	1969	4 November 1999		17 April 2026^{R}	
Malcolm Sinclair, 20th Earl of Caithness	1969	4 November 1999		29 April 2026^{E}	
Michael Onslow, 7th Earl of Onslow	1971	4 November 1999		14 May 2011^{D}	14 May 2011
John Palmer, 4th Earl of Selborne (Note: Left party to become non-affiliated in 2019)	1971	4 November 1999		26 March 2020^{R}	12 February 2021
William Astor, 4th Viscount Astor	1973	4 November 1999		29 April 2026^{E}	
William Peel, 3rd Earl Peel (Note: Joined Crossbenchers in 2006 on becoming Lord Chamberlain)	1973	4 November 1999		29 April 2026^{E}	
Patrick Stopford, 9th Earl of Courtown (Note: Qualified for the house in capacity as Baron Salterford)	1975	4 November 1999		29 April 2026^{E}	
Ivon Moore-Brabazon, 3rd Baron Brabazon of Tara	1976	4 November 1999		28 April 2022^{R}	
Simon Arthur, 4th Baron Glenarthur	1977	4 November 1999		29 April 2026^{E}	
Roger Swinfen Eady, 3rd Baron Swinfen	1977	4 November 1999		5 June 2022^{D}	5 June 2022
James Dugdale, 2nd Baron Crathorne	1977	4 November 1999		29 April 2026^{E}	
Oliver Eden, 8th Baron Henley (Note: Qualified for the house in capacity as Baron Northington)	1978	4 November 1999		29 April 2026^{E}	
Charles Chetwynd-Talbot, 22nd Earl of Shrewsbury	1981	4 November 1999		29 April 2026^{E}	
Robin Bridgeman, 3rd Viscount Bridgeman	1983	4 November 1999		9 April 2026^{D}	9 April 2026
Arthur Gore, 9th Earl of Arran (Note: Qualified for the house in capacity as Baron Sudley)	1983	4 November 1999		29 April 2026^{E}	
Alexander Scrymgeour, 12th Earl of Dundee	1983	4 November 1999		29 April 2026^{E}	
Frederick Curzon, 7th Earl Howe	1984	4 November 1999		29 April 2026^{E}	
John Astor, 3rd Baron Astor of Hever	1986	4 November 1999		22 July 2022^{R}	
Thomas Galbraith, 2nd Baron Strathclyde	1986	4 November 1999		29 April 2026^{E}	
David Verney, 21st Baron Willoughby de Broke (Note: Joined UKIP in 2007; non-affiliated from 2018.)	1986	4 November 1999		9 July 2024^{NA}	
Giles Goschen, 4th Viscount Goschen	1988	4 November 1999		29 April 2026^{E}	
Benjamin Mancroft, 3rd Baron Mancroft	1988	4 November 1999		29 April 2026^{E}	
Richard Fletcher-Vane, 2nd Baron Inglewood (Note: Left party to become non-affiliated in 2018, joined Crossbench in 2025)	1989	4 November 1999		29 April 2026^{E}	
James Lindesay-Bethune, 16th Earl of Lindsay	1989	4 November 1999		29 April 2026^{E}	9 October 2026
Francis Baring, 6th Baron Northbrook (Note: Left party to become non-affiliated in 2026)	1991	4 November 1999		29 April 2026^{E}	
Nicholas Vivian, 6th Baron Vivian	1991	4 November 1999		28 February 2004^{D}	28 February 2004
Ralph Palmer, 12th Baron Lucas	1992	4 November 1999		29 April 2026^{E}	
John Attlee, 3rd Earl Attlee	1992	4 November 1999		26 February 2026^{R}	
Hugh Lawson, 6th Baron Burnham	1993	4 November 1999		1 January 2005^{D}	1 January 2005
David Carnegie, 14th Earl of Northesk	1994	4 November 1999		28 March 2010^{D}	28 March 2010
James Graham, 8th Duke of Montrose	1995	4 November 1999		29 April 2026^{E}	
Robin Dixon, 3rd Baron Glentoran	1995	4 November 1999		1 June 2018^{R}	
Arthur Lawson Johnston, 3rd Baron Luke	1996	4 November 1999		24 June 2015^{R}	2 October 2015
Robin Cayzer, 3rd Baron Rotherwick	1996	4 November 1999		1 February 2022^{R}	
David Douglas-Home, 15th Earl of Home	1996	4 November 1999		22 August 2022^{D}	22 August 2022
Colin Moynihan, 4th Baron Moynihan	1997	4 November 1999		29 April 2026^{E}	
Hugh Trenchard, 3rd Viscount Trenchard	1987^{L}	13 May 2004	Nicholas Vivian, 6th Baron Vivian	29 April 2026^{E}	
Rupert Ponsonby, 7th Baron de Mauley	2005	10 March 2005	Hugh Lawson, 6th Baron Burnham	29 April 2026^{E}	
Charles Cathcart, 7th Earl Cathcart	1999^{L}	7 March 2007	Charles Stourton, 26th Baron Mowbray	29 April 2026^{E}	
James Younger, 5th Viscount Younger of Leckie	2010	23 June 2010	David Carnegie, 14th Earl of Northesk	29 April 2026^{E}	
Henry Ashton, 4th Baron Ashton of Hyde (Note: Left party to become non-affiliated in 2024, joined Crossbench in 2026)	2011	20 July 2011	Michael Onslow, 7th Earl of Onslow	29 April 2026^{E}	
Matthew White Ridley, 5th Viscount Ridley	2013	6 February 2013	Robert Shirley, 13th Earl Ferrers	17 December 2021^{R}	
Charles Wellesley, 9th Duke of Wellington (Note: Left party to become non-affiliated in 2019, joined Crossbench in 2020)	2015	16 September 2015	Arthur Lawson Johnston, 3rd Baron Luke	29 April 2026^{E}	
Nicholas Fairfax, 14th Lord Fairfax of Cameron	1977^{L}	24 November 2015	Edward Douglas-Scott-Montagu, 3rd Baron Montagu of Beaulieu	29 April 2026^{E}	
James Bethell, 5th Baron Bethell	2018	18 July 2018	Robin Dixon, 3rd Baron Glentoran	29 April 2026^{E}	
Guy Mansfield, 6th Baron Sandhurst	2021	14 June 2021	John Palmer, 4th Earl of Selborne	29 April 2026^{E}	
Thomas Coke, 8th Earl of Leicester	2021	14 June 2021	Bertram Bowyer, 2nd Baron Denham	29 April 2026^{E}	
Sebastian Grigg, 4th Baron Altrincham	2021	14 June 2021	Malcolm Mitchell-Thomson, 3rd Baron Selsdon	29 April 2026^{E}	
Ian Macpherson, 3rd Baron Strathcarron (Note: Left party to become non-affiliated in 2025)	2022	8 February 2022	Matthew White Ridley, 5th Viscount Ridley	29 April 2026^{E}	
Jonathan Berry, 5th Viscount Camrose	2022	29 March 2022	Robin Cayzer, 3rd Baron Rotherwick	29 April 2026^{E}	
Philip Remnant, 4th Baron Remnant	2022	5 July 2022	Ivon Moore-Brabazon, 3rd Baron Brabazon of Tara	29 April 2026^{E}	
Clifton Wrottesley, 6th Baron Wrottesley	1993^{L}	5 July 2022	Roger Swinfen Eady, 3rd Baron Swinfen	29 April 2026^{E}	
Edward Howard, 8th Earl of Effingham	2022	20 October 2022	John Astor, 3rd Baron Astor of Hever	29 April 2026^{E}	
Mark Cubitt, 5th Baron Ashcombe	2022	20 October 2022	David Douglas-Home, 15th Earl of Home	29 April 2026^{E}	

Key

^L Left the house in 1999 then subsequently rejoined by filling a vacancy
^D Died while a sitting member
^R Resigned pursuant to section 1 of House of Lords Reform Act 2014
^NA Removed for non-attendance pursuant to section 2 of House of Lords Reform Act 2014
^E Excluded pursuant to section 1 of the House of Lords (Hereditary Peers) Act 2026

Remarks

== Elected by the Crossbencher hereditary peers ==
Hereditary peer and title used in the Lords	First sat	Elected	Replacing	Left House	Died
Mark Colville, 4th Viscount Colville of Culross	1954	4 November 1999		8 April 2010^{D}	8 April 2010
John Monson, 11th Baron Monson	1961	4 November 1999		12 February 2011^{D}	12 February 2011
Raymond Jolliffe, 5th Baron Hylton	1968	4 November 1999		27 July 2023^{R}	
Davina Ingrams, 18th Baroness Darcy de Knayth	1969	4 November 1999		24 February 2008^{D}	24 February 2008
John Slim, 2nd Viscount Slim	1971	4 November 1999		12 January 2019^{D}	12 January 2019
Janric Craig, 3rd Viscount Craigavon	1974	4 November 1999		31 March 2025^{D}	31 March 2025
Thomas Bridges, 2nd Baron Bridges	1975	4 November 1999		18 May 2016^{NA}	27 May 2017
Ambrose Greenway, 4th Baron Greenway	1975	4 November 1999		29 April 2026^{E}	
John Wilson, 2nd Baron Moran	1977	4 November 1999		14 February 2014^{D}	14 February 2014
Edward Baldwin, 4th Earl Baldwin of Bewdley	1977	4 November 1999		9 May 2018^{R}	16 June 2021
Anthony St John, 22nd Baron St John of Bletso	1978	4 November 1999		27 March 2026^{R}	
Merlin Hay, 24th Earl of Erroll	1978	4 November 1999		29 April 2026^{E}	
Flora Fraser, 21st Lady Saltoun	1979	4 November 1999		12 December 2014^{R}	3 September 2024
Peter St Clair-Erskine, 7th Earl of Rosslyn	1979	4 November 1999		29 April 2026^{E}	
Christopher Bathurst, 3rd Viscount Bledisloe	1979	4 November 1999		12 May 2009^{D}	12 May 2009
Christopher James, 5th Baron Northbourne	1982	4 November 1999		4 September 2018^{R}	8 September 2019
William Lloyd George, 3rd Viscount Tenby	1983	4 November 1999		1 May 2015^{R}	12 June 2023
Michael Allenby, 3rd Viscount Allenby	1985	4 November 1999		3 October 2014^{D}	3 October 2014
Cherry Drummond, 16th Baroness Strange	1986	4 November 1999		11 March 2005^{D}	11 March 2005
Alan Brooke, 3rd Viscount Brookeborough	1987	4 November 1999		29 April 2026^{E}	
Henry Herbert, 7th Earl of Carnarvon	1987	4 November 1999		10 September 2001^{D}	10 September 2001
Robert Walpole, 10th Baron Walpole	1989	4 November 1999		13 June 2017^{R}	8 May 2021
Ziki Robertson, 11th Baroness Wharton	1990	4 November 1999		15 May 2000^{D}	15 May 2000
John Anderson, 3rd Viscount Waverley	1990	4 November 1999		23 June 2025^{R}	
Adrian Palmer, 4th Baron Palmer	1990	4 November 1999		10 July 2023^{D}	10 July 2023
Valerian Freyberg, 3rd Baron Freyberg	1994	4 November 1999		29 April 2026^{E}	
John Montagu, 11th Earl of Sandwich	1995	4 November 1999		20 May 2024^{R}	1 February 2025
Francis Hare, 6th Earl of Listowel (Note: Qualified for the house in capacity as Baron Hare)	1998	4 November 1999		21 July 2022^{R}	
David Lytton Cobbold, 2nd Baron Cobbold	1988^{L}	15 May 2000 (Note: Obtained seat on that date based on ballot results of 4 November 1999)	Ziki Robertson, 11th Baroness Wharton	13 October 2014^{R}	10 May 2022
Roger Chorley, 2nd Baron Chorley	1978^{L}	11 September 2001 (Note: Obtained seat on that date based on ballot results of 4 November 1999)	Henry Herbert, 7th Earl of Carnarvon	17 November 2014^{R}	21 February 2016
David Montgomery, 2nd Viscount Montgomery of Alamein	1976^{L}	23 June 2005	Cherry Drummond, 16th Baroness Strange	23 July 2015^{R}	8 January 2020
John Dalrymple, 14th Earl of Stair	1998^{L}	22 May 2008	Davina Ingrams, 18th Baroness Darcy de Knayth	29 April 2026^{E}	
Alastair Bruce, 5th Baron Aberdare	2009	15 July 2009	Christopher Bathurst, 3rd Viscount Bledisloe	31 August 2025^{R}	
Nicholas Trench, 9th Earl of Clancarty (Note: Qualified for the house in capacity as Viscount Clancarty)	1995^{L}	23 June 2010	Mark Colville, 4th Viscount Colville of Culross	29 April 2026^{E}	
John Lytton, 5th Earl of Lytton	1985^{L}	11 May 2011	John Monson, 11th Baron Monson	28 March 2026^{R}	
Godfrey Bewicke-Copley, 7th Baron Cromwell	1982^{L}	9 April 2014	John Wilson, 2nd Baron Moran	29 April 2026^{E}	
Simon Russell, 3rd Baron Russell of Liverpool	1982^{L}	9 December 2014	Michael Allenby, 3rd Viscount Allenby	29 April 2026^{E}	
John Seymour, 19th Duke of Somerset	1985^{L}	9 December 2014	David Lytton Cobbold, 2nd Baron Cobbold	29 April 2026^{E}	
Roualeyn Hovell-Thurlow-Cumming-Bruce, 9th Baron Thurlow	2015	2 February 2015	Roger Chorley, 2nd Baron Chorley	29 April 2026^{E}	
Charles Hay, 16th Earl of Kinnoull	2015	2 February 2015	Flora Fraser, 21st Lady Saltoun	Sitting as life peer (Note: Ceased to sit as an excepted hereditary peer on 29 April 2026; however, had held a life peerage—Baron Kinnoull of the Ochils—since 6 February 2026 and therefore continued to sit in the House of Lords without interruption.)	
Jeffrey Evans, 4th Baron Mountevans	2015	6 July 2015	William Lloyd George, 3rd Viscount Tenby	29 April 2026^{E}	
Patrick Lawrence, 5th Baron Trevethin	2015	19 October 2015	David Montgomery, 2nd Viscount Montgomery of Alamein	29 April 2026^{E}	
John Boyle, 15th Earl of Cork (Note: Qualified for the house in capacity as Baron Boyle of Marston)	2016	11 July 2016	Thomas Bridges, 2nd Baron Bridges	29 April 2026^{E}	
Richard Gilbey, 12th Baron Vaux of Harrowden	2017	18 July 2017	Robert Walpole, 10th Baron Walpole	29 April 2026^{E}	
Charles Courtenay, 19th Earl of Devon	2018	3 July 2018	Edward Baldwin, 4th Earl Baldwin of Bewdley	29 April 2026^{E}	
Rupert Carington, 7th Baron Carrington (Note: Became Lord Great Chamberlain in 2022)	2018	27 November 2018	Christopher James, 5th Baron Northbourne	29 April 2026^{E}	
Daniel Mosley, 4th Baron Ravensdale	2019	26 March 2019	John Slim, 2nd Viscount Slim	29 April 2026^{E}	
John Pakington, 7th Baron Hampton	2022	19 October 2022	Francis Hare, 6th Earl of Listowel	29 April 2026^{E}	
James Meston, 3rd Baron Meston	1984^{L}	19 September 2023	Adrian Palmer, 4th Baron Palmer	29 April 2026^{E}	
Miles Russell, 28th Baron de Clifford	2023	19 September 2023	Raymond Jolliffe, 5th Baron Hylton	29 April 2026^{E}	

Key

^L Left the house in 1999 then subsequently rejoined by filling a vacancy
^D Died while a sitting member
^R Resigned pursuant to section 1 of House of Lords Reform Act 2014
^NA Removed for non-attendance pursuant to section 2 of House of Lords Reform Act 2014
^E Excluded pursuant to section 1 of the House of Lords (Hereditary Peers) Act 2026

Remarks

== Elected by the Labour hereditary peers ==
Hereditary peer and title used in the Lords	First sat	Elected	Replacing	Left House	Died
Michael Milner, 2nd Baron Milner of Leeds	1967	4 November 1999		20 August 2003^{D}	20 August 2003
Nicolas Rea, 3rd Baron Rea	1982	4 November 1999		1 June 2020^{D}	1 June 2020
John Suenson-Taylor, 3rd Baron Grantchester	1995^{L}	30 October 2003	Michael Milner, 2nd Baron Milner of Leeds	29 April 2026^{E}	
Stephen Benn, 3rd Viscount Stansgate	2021	9 July 2021	Nicolas Rea, 3rd Baron Rea	29 April 2026^{E}	

Key

^L Left the house in 1999 then subsequently rejoined by filling a vacancy
^D Died while a sitting member
^E Excluded pursuant to section 1 of the House of Lords (Hereditary Peers) Act 2026

== Elected by the Liberal Democrats hereditary peers ==
Hereditary peer and title used in the Lords	First sat	Elected	Replacing	Left House	Died
Eric Lubbock, 4th Baron Avebury	1971	4 November 1999		14 February 2016^{D}	14 February 2016
Dominic Hubbard, 6th Baron Addington	1986	4 November 1999		Sitting as life peer (Note: Ceased to sit as an excepted hereditary peer on 29 April 2026; however, had held a life peerage—Baron Hubbard—since 18 February 2026 and therefore continued to sit in the House of Lords without interruption.)	
Conrad Russell, 5th Earl Russell	1988	4 November 1999		14 October 2004^{D}	14 October 2004
Patrick Boyle, 10th Earl of Glasgow	1984^{L}	12 January 2005	Conrad Russell, 5th Earl Russell	29 April 2026^{E}	
John Archibald Sinclair, 3rd Viscount Thurso	1995^{L}	18 April 2016	Eric Lubbock, 4th Baron Avebury	29 April 2026^{E}	

Key

^L Left the house in 1999 then subsequently rejoined by filling a vacancy
^D Died while a sitting member
^E Excluded pursuant to section 1 of the House of Lords (Hereditary Peers) Act 2026

Remarks

== See also ==
- 1999 House of Lords elections
- By-elections to the House of Lords
- List of hereditary peers in the House of Lords by virtue of a life peerage
- List of hereditary peers removed under the House of Lords Act 1999
- Peerage of the United Kingdom
  - Hereditary peerage
