= Hereditary peer =

United Kingdom aristocrats

The hereditary peers form part of the peerage in the United Kingdom. As of July 2026, there were 798 hereditary peers: 29 dukes (including five royal dukes, excluding the Duke of Edinburgh who is a life peer, the holder being an hereditary earl), 34 marquesses, 189 earls, 107 viscounts, and 439 barons (not counting subsidiary titles).

As a result of the Peerage Act 1963, all peers except those in the peerage of Ireland were entitled to sit in the House of Lords. After the House of Lords Act 1999 came into force, only 92 of them, elected from all hereditary peers, were permitted to do so, unless they were also life peers. The rights of these 92 to sit in the Lords were removed by the House of Lords (Hereditary Peers) Act 2026; they left the Lords when the 2024–26 session ended in April 2026, except for eight who already had life peerages, and 26 more subsequently re-entered after being granted life peerages.

Not all hereditary titles are titles of the peerage. For instance, baronets and baronetesses may pass on their titles, but they are not peers. Scottish barons are also titled nobles but not peers. Conversely, the holder of a non-hereditary title may belong to the peerage, as with life peers. Peerages may be created by means of letters patent, but the granting of new hereditary peerages has dwindled: eight hereditary peerages have been created since 1965, five of them for members of the British royal family.

The most recent grant of a hereditary peerage was in 2019 for the youngest child of Elizabeth II, Prince Edward, who was created Earl of Forfar. The most recent grant of a hereditary peerage to a non-royal was in 1984 for former Prime Minister Harold Macmillan, who was created Earl of Stockton with the subsidiary title of Viscount Macmillan of Ovenden.

== Origins ==
The hereditary peerage, as it now exists, combines several different English institutions with analogues from Scotland and Ireland.

English earls are an Anglo-Saxon institution. Around 1014, England was divided into shires or counties, largely to defend against the Danes. Each shire was led by a local great man, called an earl, and the same man could be earl of several shires. When the Normans invaded England, they continued to appoint earls, but not for all counties; the administrative head of the county became the sheriff. Earldoms began as offices, with a perquisite of a share of the legal fees in the county. They gradually became honours, with a stipend of £20 a year.

Like most feudal offices, earldoms were inherited, but the kings frequently asked earls to resign or exchange earldoms. Usually there were few earls in England, and they were men of great wealth in the shire from which they held title, or an adjacent one, but it depended on circumstances: during the civil war between Stephen and the Empress Matilda, nine earls were created in three years.

William the Conqueror and his great-grandson Henry II did not make dukes; they were themselves only Dukes of Normandy or Aquitaine. When Edward III of England declared himself King of France, he made his sons dukes, to distinguish them from other noblemen, much as royal dukes are now distinguished from other dukes. Later kings created marquesses and viscounts to make finer gradations of honour: a rank something more than an earl and something less than an earl, respectively.

When Henry III or Edward I wanted money or advice from his subjects, he would order great churchmen, earls, and other great men to come to his Great Council. Some of these assemblies are now considered the first parliaments. He would generally order lesser men from towns and counties to gather and pick some men to represent them. The English Order of Barons evolved from those men who were individually ordered to attend Parliament, but held no other title. The chosen representatives became the House of Commons.

This order, called a writ, was not originally hereditary, or even a privilege. The recipient had to come to the Great Council at his own expense, vote on taxes on himself and his neighbours, acknowledge that he was the king's tenant-in-chief (which might cost him special taxes) and risk involvement in royal politics—or a request from the king for a personal loan, a benevolence. Which men were ordered to council varied from council to council. A man might be ordered once and never again, or all his life, but his son and heir might never go.

Under Henry VI, in the 15th century, just before the Wars of the Roses, attendance at Parliament became more valuable. The first claim of hereditary right to a writ comes from this reign; so does the first patent, or charter declaring a man to be a baron. The five orders began to be called peers. Holders of older peerages began to receive greater honour than peers of the same rank just created.

If a man held a peerage, his son would succeed to it; if he had no children, his brother would succeed. If he had a single daughter, his son-in-law would inherit the family lands, and usually the same peerage. More complex cases were decided depending on circumstances. Customs changed with time. Earldoms were the first to be hereditary, and three different rules can be traced for the case of an earl who left no sons and several married daughters. In the 13th century, the husband of the eldest daughter inherited the earldom automatically. In the 15th century, the earldom reverted to the Crown, who might re-grant it, often to the eldest son-in-law. In the 17th century, it would not be inherited by anybody unless all but one of the daughters died and left no descendants, in which case the remaining daughter, or her heir, would inherit.

After Henry II became the Lord of Ireland, he and his successors began to imitate the English system of the time. Irish earls were first created in the 13th century, and Irish parliaments began later in the same century; until Henry VIII declared himself King of Ireland, these parliaments were small bodies, representing only the Irish Pale. A writ does not create a peerage in Ireland: all Irish peerages are by patent or charter, although some early patents have been lost. After James II left England, he was King of Ireland alone for a time. Three creations he ordered are in the Irish Patent Roll, although the patents were never issued, but are treated as valid.

The Irish peers were in a peculiar political position: because they were subjects of the King of England, but peers in a different kingdom, they could sit in the English House of Commons, and many did. In the 18th century, Irish peerages became rewards for English politicians, limited only by the concern that they might go to Dublin and interfere with the Irish Government.

Scotland evolved a similar system, differing in points of detail. The first Scottish earldoms derive from the seven mormaers, of immemorial antiquity; they were named earls by Queen Margaret. The Parliament of Scotland is as old as the English. The Scottish equivalent of baronies are called lordships of Parliament.

The Act of Union 1707, between England and Scotland, provided that future peerages should be peers of Great Britain, and the rules covering the peers should follow the English model. Because there were proportionately many more Scottish peers, they chose a number of representatives to sit in the British House of Lords. The Acts of Union 1800 similarly superseded the peerage of Great Britain with peers of the United Kingdom, but provided that Irish peerages could still be created.

The Irish peers were concerned that their honours would be diluted as cheap prizes, and insisted that an Irish peerage could be created only when three Irish peerages had gone extinct (until there were only a hundred Irish peers left). In the early 19th century, Irish creations were as frequent as this allowed. Only three have been created since 1863, and none since 1898. As of 2011, 66 "only-Irish" peers remain. (Note: Counting those listed in the article Peerage of Ireland.)

== Modern laws ==
The law applicable to a British hereditary peerage depends on which Kingdom it belongs to. Peerages of England, Great Britain, and the United Kingdom follow English law; the difference between them is that peerages of England were created before the Act of Union 1707, peerages of Great Britain were created between 1707 and the Union with Ireland in 1800, and peerages of the United Kingdom were created after 1800.

Irish peerages follow the law of the Kingdom of Ireland, which is very much similar to English law, except in referring to the Irish Parliament and Irish officials, generally no longer appointed. No Irish peers have been created since 1898, and they have no part in the present governance of the United Kingdom. Scottish peerage law is generally similar to English law, but differs in innumerable points of detail, often being more similar to medieval practice.

Women are ineligible to succeed to the majority of English, Irish, and British hereditary peerages, but may inherit certain English baronies by writ and Scottish peerages in the absence of a male heir.

== Ranks and titles ==
The House of Lords, sitting in its old chamber, burned down in 1834, as drawn by Augustus Pugin and Thomas Rowlandson for Rudolph Ackermann's Microcosm of London, 1808–1811

The ranks of the peerage in most of the United Kingdom are, in descending order of rank, duke, marquess, earl, viscount and baron. The female equivalents are duchess, marchioness, countess, viscountess and baroness, respectively. Women typically do not hold hereditary titles in their own right, although there are a few titles still extant where they do, for example, Baroness D'Arcy de Knayth. One significant change to the status quo in England was in 1532 when Henry VIII created the Marquess of Pembroke title for his soon-to-be wife, Anne Boleyn; she held this title in her own right and was therefore ennobled with the same rank as a male.

In the Scottish peerage, the lowest rank is lordship of Parliament, the male holder thereof being known as a lord of Parliament. A Scottish barony is a feudal rank, and not of the Peerage. The barony by tenure or feudal barony in England and Wales was similar to a Scottish feudal barony, in being hereditary, but is long obsolete, the last full summons of the English feudal barons to military service having occurred in 1327. The Tenures Abolition Act 1660 quashed any remaining doubt as to their continued status.

Peerage dignities are created by the sovereign by writs of summons or letters patent. Under modern constitutional conventions, no peerage dignity, with the possible exception of those given to members of the royal family, would be created if not upon the advice of the prime minister.

Many peers hold more than one hereditary title. For example, the same individual may be a duke, a marquess, an earl, a viscount, and a baron by virtue of different peerages. If such a person is entitled to sit in the House of Lords, they still have only one vote. Until the House of Lords Act 1999, it was possible for one of the peer's subsidiary titles to be passed to his heir before death by means of a writ of acceleration, in which case the peer and his heir would have one vote each. Where this is not done, the heir may still use one of the father's subsidiary titles as a courtesy title, but he is not considered a peer.

== Inheritance of peerages ==
The mode of inheritance of an hereditary peerage is determined by the method of its creation. Titles may be created by writ of summons, or by letters patent. A writ of summons is merely a summons of an individual to Parliament and does not explicitly confer a peerage. Descent is always to the heirs of the body, male and female.

A letters patent explicitly creates a peerage and names the dignity in question. Letters patent may state the course of descent. Usually, this is to only male heirs, but by a special remainder other descents can be specified. The Gender Recognition Act 2004 regulates acquired gender and provides that acquiring a new gender under the Act does not affect the descent of any peerage.

Children are deemed to be legitimate if their parents are married at the time of their birth or marry later; only legitimate children may succeed to a title. An English, Irish, or British (but not Scottish) peerage can only be inherited by a child born legitimate, not legitimated by a later marriage. An example of this can be seen in the film director Christopher Guest, who bypassed his older half-brother Anthony to became the 5th Baron Haden-Guest, as the 4th Baron Haden-Guest was not married to Anthony's mother at the time of his birth.

Normally, a peerage passes to the next holder on the death of the previous holder. However, Edward IV introduced a procedure known as a writ of acceleration, whereby it was possible for the eldest son of a peer holding more than one peerage to sit in the House of Lords by virtue of one of his father's subsidiary dignities.

A person who is a possible heir to a peerage is said to be "in remainder". A title becomes extinct (an opposite to extant, alive) when all possible heirs, as provided by the letters patent, have died out; i.e., there is nobody in remainder at the death of the holder. A title becomes dormant if nobody has claimed the title, or if no claim has been satisfactorily proven. A title goes into abeyance if there is more than one person equally entitled to be the holder.

In the past, peerages were sometimes forfeit or attainted under Acts of Parliament, most often as the result of treason on the part of the holder. The blood of an attainted peer was considered "corrupted", and consequently, his or her descendants could not inherit the title. If all descendants of the attainted peer were to die out, however, an heir from another branch of the family not affected by the attainder could take the title. The Forfeiture Act 1870 abolished corruption of blood: instead of losing the peerage, a peer convicted of treason would be disqualified from sitting in Parliament for the period of imprisonment.

The Titles Deprivation Act 1917 permitted the Crown to suspend peerages if their holders had fought against the United Kingdom during the First World War. Guilt was to be determined by a committee of the Privy Council. Either House of Parliament could reject the committee's report within 40 days of its presentation.

In 1919, King George V issued an Order in Council suspending the Dukedom of Albany (together with its subsidiary peerages, the Earldom of Clarence and the Barony of Arklow), the Dukedom of Cumberland and Teviotdale (along with the Earldom of Armagh) and the Viscountcy of Taaffe (along with the Barony of Ballymote). Under the Titles Deprivation Act, the successors to the peerages may petition the Crown for a reinstatement of the titles; so far, none of them has chosen to do so (the Taaffe and Ballymote peerages would have become extinct in 1967).

Nothing prevents a British peerage from being held by a foreign citizen. Such peers cannot sit in the House of Lords, while the term foreign does not include Irish or Commonwealth citizens. Several descendants of George III were British peers and German subjects; the Lords Fairfax of Cameron were American citizens for several generations.

A peer may also disclaim an hereditary peerage under the Peerage Act 1963. To do so, the peer must deliver an instrument of disclaimer to the Lord Chancellor within 12 months of succeeding to the peerage, or, if under the age of 21 at the time of succession, within 12 months of becoming 21 years old. If, at the time of succession, the peer is a member of the House of Commons, then the instrument must be delivered within one month of succession. Meanwhile, the peer may not sit or vote in the House of Commons.

Prior to the House of Lords Act 1999, a hereditary peer could not disclaim a peerage after having applied for a writ of summons to Parliament. Irish peerages may not be disclaimed. A peer who disclaims the peerage loses all titles, rights and privileges associated with the peerage; his wife or her husband is similarly affected. No further hereditary peerages may be conferred upon the person, but life peerages may be. The peerage remains without a holder until the death of the peer making the disclaimer, when it descends normally.

=== Merging in the Crown ===
A title held by someone who becomes monarch is said to merge in the Crown and therefore ceases to exist, because the sovereign cannot hold a dignity from himself.

The Dukedoms of Cornwall and of Rothesay, and the Earldom of Carrick, are special cases, which when not in use are said to lapse to the Crown: they are construed as existing, but held by no one, during such periods. These peerages are also special in that they are never directly inherited. The Dukedom of Cornwall was held formerly by the eldest son of the King of England. The Dukedom of Rothesay, the Earldom of Carrick, and certain non-peerage titles (Baron of Renfrew, Lord of the Isles and Prince and Great Steward of Scotland) were held by the eldest son of the King of Scotland. Since the union of Scotland England, dukedoms and associated subsidiary titles (i.e Duke of Cornwall, Duke of Rothesay, Earl of Carrick) are automatically held by the heir apparent, only if that person is a son of the reigning monarch. In Scotland, the title Duke of Rothesay is used for life or until accession. In England and Northern Ireland, the title Duke of Cornwall is used until the heir apparent is formally created Prince of Wales.

The English sovereign's heir apparent, if male, regardless of whether they are the monarch's son, has customarily been created the Prince of Wales, and at the same time, the Earl of Chester since the 1300s. The principality and earldom is not hereditary, instead merging in or reverting to the Crown, respectively, when the prince either succeeds to the Crown or predeceases the monarch: thus George III, then the grandson of the reigning monarch, was created Prince of Wales and Earl of Chester a month after the death of his father Frederick, Prince of Wales.

The Dukedom of Cornwall is associated with the Duchy of Cornwall. The Dukedom of Cornwall is a peerage dignity. The Duchy of Cornwall is an estate held by the Duke of Cornwall. Income from the duchy goes to the Duke of Cornwall, or, when there is no duke, to the sovereign. The money is then paid to the heir to the throne under the Sovereign Grant Act 2011.

The only other duchy in the United Kingdom is the Duchy of Lancaster, which is also an estate rather than a peerage dignity. The Dukedom of Lancaster merged in the Crown when Henry of Monmouth, Duke of Lancaster became King Henry V. The Duchy of Lancaster continues to exist, theoretically run by the Chancellor of the Duchy of Lancaster, which is normally a sinecure position with no actual duties related to the duchy and is used to appoint a minister without portfolio. The Duchy of Lancaster is the inherited property that belongs personally to the monarch, rather than to the Crown. Thus, while income from the Crown Estate is turned over to the Exchequer in return for a sovereign grant payment, the income from the duchy forms a part of the Privy Purse, the personal funds of the sovereign.

== Writs of summons ==
At the beginning of each new parliament, each peer who has established his or her right to attend Parliament is issued a writ of summons. Without the writ, no peer may sit or vote in Parliament. The form of writs of summons has changed little over the centuries. It is established precedent that the sovereign may not deny writs of summons to qualified peers.

=== Baronies by writ ===
By modern English law, if a writ of summons was issued to a person who was not a peer, that person took his seat in Parliament, and the parliament was a parliament in the modern sense (including representatives of the Commons), that single writ created a barony, a perpetual peerage inheritable by male-preference primogeniture. This was not medieval practice, and it is doubtful whether any writ was ever issued with the intent of creating such a peerage.

The last instance of a man being summoned by writ without already holding a peerage was under the early Tudors. The first clear decision that a single writ, as opposed to a long succession of writs, created a peerage was in Lord Abergavenny's case of 1610. The House of Lords Act 1999 also renders it doubtful that such a writ would now create a peer if one were now issued. This doctrine is applied retrospectively: if it can be shown that a writ was issued, that the recipient sat and that the council in question was a parliament, the Committee of Privileges of the House of Lords determines who is now entitled to the peerage as though modern law had always applied.

Several such long-lost baronies were claimed in the 19th and 20th centuries, though the committee was not consistent on what constituted proof of a writ, what constituted proof of sitting, and which 13th-century assemblages were actually parliaments. Even a writ issued in error is held to create a peerage, unless the writ was cancelled before the recipient took his seat. The cancellation was performed by the now obsolete writ of supersedeas.

Peerages created by writ of summons are presumed to be inheritable only by the recipient's heirs of the body. The House of Lords has settled such a presumption in several cases, including Lord Grey's Case (1640) Cro Cas 601, the Clifton Barony Case (1673), the Vaux Peerage Case (1837) 5 Cl & Fin 526, the Braye Peerage Case (1839) 6 Cl & Fin 757 and the Hastings Peerage Case (1841) 8 Cl & Fin 144. The meaning of heir of the body is determined by common law. Essentially, descent is by the rules of male primogeniture, a mechanism whereby normally, male descendants of the peer take precedence over female descendants, with children representing their deceased ancestors, and wherein the senior line of descent always takes precedence over the junior line per each gender.

These rules are amended by the proviso whereby sisters and their heirs are considered co-heirs. Seniority of the line is irrelevant when succession is through a female line. In other words, no woman inherits because she is older than her sisters. If all of the co-heirs but one die, then the surviving co-heir succeeds to the title. Otherwise, the title remains abeyant until the sovereign "terminates" the abeyance in favour of one of the co-heirs. The termination of an abeyance is entirely at the discretion of the Crown.

A writ of acceleration is a type of writ of summons that enables the eldest son of a peer to attend the House of Lords using one of his father's subsidiary titles. The title is strictly not inherited by the eldest son. It remains vested in the father. A writ may be granted only if the title being accelerated is a subsidiary one, and not the main title, and if the beneficiary of the writ is the heir-apparent of the actual holder of the title.

Ninety-four writs of acceleration have been issued since Edward IV issued the first one, including four writs issued in the 20th century. The only individual who recently sat in the House of Lords by writ of acceleration is Viscount Cranborne in 1992, through the Barony of Cecil, which was held by his father, the Marquess of Salisbury. Viscount Cranborne succeeded to the marquessate on the death of his father in 2003.

There are no Scottish peerages created by writ. Neither can Scottish baronies go into abeyance, for Scots law does not hold sisters as equal heirs regardless of age. There is one extant barony by writ in the Peerage of Ireland, that of La Poer, now held by the Marquess of Waterford. Certain other baronies were originally created by writ but later confirmed by letters patent.

== Letters patent ==
More often, letters patent are used to create peerages. Letters patent must explicitly name the recipient of the title and specify the course of descent. The exact meaning of the term is determined by common law. For remainders in the Peerage of the United Kingdom, the most common wording is "to have and to hold unto him and the heirs male of his body lawfully begotten and to be begotten". Where the letters patent specifies the peer's heirs male of the body as successors, the rules of agnatic succession apply, meaning that succession is through the male line only.

Some very old titles, like the Earldom of Arlington, may pass to heirs of the body (not just heirs-male). These follow the same rules of descent as do baronies by writ and seem able to fall into abeyance as well. Many Scottish titles allow for passage to heirs general of the body, in which case the rules of male primogeniture apply. They do not fall into abeyance, as under Scots law, sisters are not treated as equal co-heirs.

English and British letters patent that do not specify a course of descent are invalid. The same is not true for the letters patent creating peers in the Peerage of Scotland. The House of Lords has ruled in certain cases that when the course of descent is not specified, or when the letters patent are lost, the title descends to heirs-male.

=== Limitation to heirs of the body ===
It is generally necessary for English patents to include limitation to heirs "of the body", unless a special remainder is specified (see below). The limitation indicates that only lineal biological descendants of the original peer may succeed to the peerage. In some very rare instances, the limitation was left out. In the Devon Peerage Case (1831) 2 Dow & Cl 200, the House of Lords permitted an heir who was a collateral descendant of the original peer to take his seat. The precedent was reversed in 1859, when the House of Lords decided in the Wiltes Peerage Case (1869) LR 4 HL 126 that a patent that did not include the words "of the body" would be held void.

=== Special remainder ===
It is possible for a patent to allow for succession by someone other than an heir-male or heir of the body, under a so-called special remainder. Several instances may be cited: the Barony of Nelson to an elder brother and his heirs-male, the Earldom of Roberts to a daughter and her heirs-male, the Barony of Amherst to a nephew and his heirs-male, and the Dukedom of Dover to a younger son and his heirs-male while the eldest son is still alive. In many cases, at the time of the grant, the proposed peer in question had no sons, nor any prospect of producing any. The special remainder was made to allow remembrance of his personal honour to continue after his death, and to preclude an otherwise certain rapid extinction of the peerage.

In all cases the course of descent specified in the patent must be known in common law. For instance, the Crown may not make a "shifting limitation" in the letters patent. In other words, the patent may not vest the peerage in an individual and then, before that person's death, shift the title to another person. The doctrine was established in the Buckhurst Peerage Case (1876) 2 App Cas 1, in which the House of Lords deemed invalid the clause intended to keep the Barony of Buckhurst separate from the Earldom of De La Warr. The invalidation of clause may not affect the validity of the letters patent itself. The patent stipulated that if the holder of the barony should ever inherit the earldom, then he would be deprived of the barony, which would instead pass to the next successor as if the deprived holder had died without issue.

=== Amendment of letters patent ===
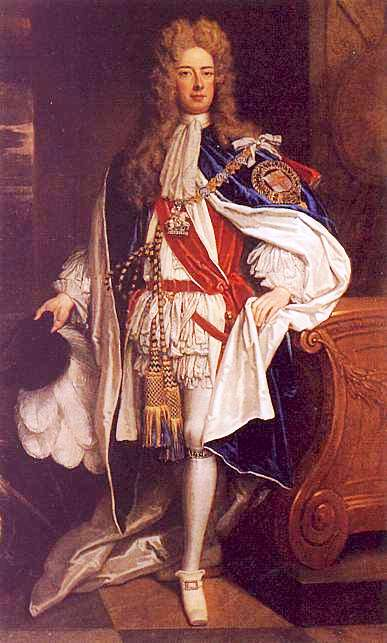
Letters patent granting the Dukedom of Marlborough to Sir John Churchill were later amended by Parliament.

Letters patent are not absolute. They may be amended or revoked by Act of Parliament. For example, Parliament amended the letters patent creating the Dukedom of Marlborough in 1706. The patent originally provided that the dukedom could be inherited by the heirs-male of the body of the first duke, Captain-General Sir John Churchill. One son had died in infancy and the other died in 1703 from smallpox.

Under Parliament's amendment to the patent, designed to allow the famous general's honour to survive after his death, the dukedom was allowed to pass to the Duke's daughters; Lady Henrietta, the Countess of Sunderland, the Countess of Bridgewater and Lady Mary and their heirs-male—and thereafter "to all and every other the issue male and female, lineally descending of or from the said Duke of Marlborough, in such manner and for such estate as the same are before limited to the before-mentioned issue of the said Duke, it being intended that the said honours shall continue, remain, and be invested in all the issue of the said Duke, so long as any such issue male or female shall continue, and be held by them severally and successively in manner and form aforesaid, the elder and the descendants of every elder issue to be preferred before the younger of such issue."

== Number of hereditary peers ==
The number of peers has varied considerably with time. At the end of the Wars of the Roses, which killed many peers, and degraded or attainted many others, there were only 29 Lords Temporal; but the population of England was also much smaller then. The Tudors doubled the number of Peers, creating many but executing others. At the death of Queen Elizabeth I, there were 59.

Creation of English peerage dignities by Stuart monarchs
Sovereign	Reign	Peers
James I	1603–1625	62
Charles I	1625–1649	59
Charles II	1660–1685	64
James II	1685–1689	8
William III & Mary II	1689–1702	30
Anne	1702–1714	30
Total	1603–1714	253

The number of peers grew under the Stuarts and all later monarchs. By the time of Queen Anne's death in 1714, there were 168 peers. In 1712, Queen Anne was called upon to create 12 peers in one day in order to pass a government measure, more than Queen Elizabeth I had created during a 45-year reign.

Several peers were alarmed at the rapid increase in the size of the Peerage, fearing that their individual importance and power would decrease as the number of peers increased. Therefore, in 1719, a bill was introduced in the House of Lords to place a limitation on the Crown's power. It sought to permit no more than six new creations, and thereafter one new creation for each other title that became extinct. It allowed the Crown to bestow titles on members of the Royal Family without any such limitation. The Bill was rejected in its final stage in the Lords. It was passed in the Lords when it was reintroduced in the next year. The House of Commons rejected the Peerage Bill by 269 to 177.

George III was especially profuse with the creation of titles, mainly due to the desire of some of his Prime Ministers to obtain a majority in the House of Lords. During his 12 years in power, Lord North had about 30 new peerages created. During William Pitt the Younger's 17-year tenure, over 140 new peerages were awarded.

A restriction on the creation of peerages, but only in the Peerage of Ireland, was enacted under the Acts of Union 1800 that combined Ireland and Great Britain into the United Kingdom in 1801. New creations were restricted to a maximum of one new Irish peerage for every three existing Irish peerages that became extinct, excluding those held concurrently with an English or British peerage. Only if the number of Irish peers dropped below 100 could the sovereign create one new Irish peerage for each extinction.

There were no restrictions on creations in the Peerage of the United Kingdom, which continued to swell through the 1800s. In the 20th century, there were even more creations, as Prime Ministers were again eager to secure majorities in the House of Lords. Peerages were handed out not to honour the recipient, but to give them a seat in the House of Lords.

== Current status ==
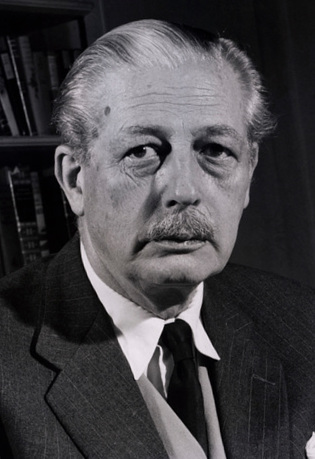
In 1984 Harold Macmillan, a former prime minister, was the last non-royal recipient of a hereditary peerage, the Earldom of Stockton.

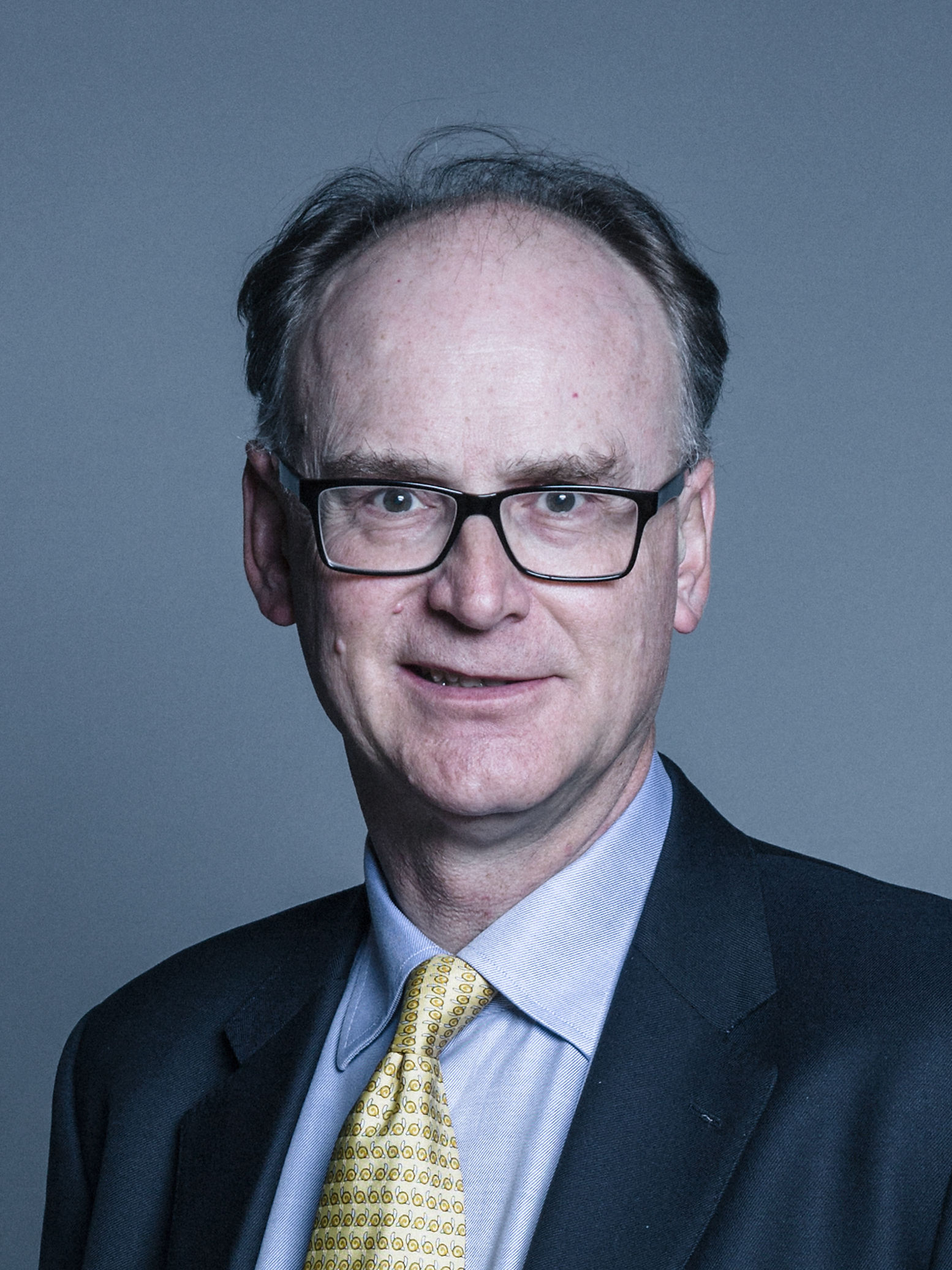
Matt Ridley, science writer and conservative journalist, is the Viscount Ridley.

Since the start of the Labour government of Harold Wilson in 1964, the practice of granting hereditary peerages has largely ceased except for members of the royal family. Eight hereditary peers have been created since 1965: five in the royal family (the Duke of York, the Earl of Wessex and Earl of Forfar, the Duke of Cambridge, and the Duke of Sussex) and three additional creations under Margaret Thatcher's government (the Viscount Whitelaw [had four daughters], the Viscount Tonypandy [had no issue] and the Earl of Stockton [with issue]).

The two viscounts died without male heirs, extinguishing their titles. Harold Macmillan, 1st Earl of Stockton received the earldom customarily bestowed on former prime ministers after he retired from the House of Commons. As for the practice of granting hereditary titles, usually earldoms, to male commoners who married into the royal family, the latest offer of such peerage was in 1973 to Captain Mark Phillips, husband of Princess Anne, who declined. The most recent to accept was the Earl of Snowdon, husband of Princess Margaret, in 1961.

There is no statute that prevents the creation of new hereditary peerages. They may technically be created at any time, and the government continues to maintain pro forma letters patent for their creation. The most recent policies outlining the creation of new peerages, the Royal Warrant of 2004, explicitly apply to both hereditary and life peers. However, successive governments have largely disowned the practice, and the Royal Household website currently describes the King as the fount of honour for "life peerages, knighthoods and gallantry awards", with no mention of hereditary titles.

=== Roles ===
Until the coming into force of the Peerage Act 1963, peers could not disclaim their peerage in order to sit in the House of Commons, and thus a peerage was sometimes seen as an impediment to a future political career. The law changed due to an agreement that the Labour MP Tony Benn (formerly the Viscount Stansgate) having been deprived of his seat due to an inadvertent inheritance was undemocratic, and the desire of the Conservatives to put their choice of prime minister (ultimately Alec Douglas-Home) into the House of Commons, which by that time was deemed politically necessary.

In 1999, the House of Lords Act abolished the automatic right of hereditary peers to sit in the House of Lords; out of about 750 hereditary peers, only 92 could sit in the Lords. The Act provided that 90 of those 92 seats were to be elected by other members of the House: 15 by vote of the whole house, including life peers, 42 by the Conservative hereditary peers, two by the Labour hereditary peers, three by the Liberal Democrat hereditary peers, and 28 by the crossbench hereditary peers.

In October and November 1999, elections were held to choose those initial 90 peers, with all hereditary peers eligible to vote. Hereditary peers elected held their seats until their death, resignation or exclusion for non-attendance (the latter two means introduced by the House of Lords Reform Act 2014), at which point by-elections were held to maintain the number at 92. In 2024, the Starmer Labour government announced in the King's speech that they would bring in legislation to abolish the remaining hereditary peers' right to sit in the House of Lords, which was achieved by the House of Lords (Hereditary Peers) Act 2026. Consequently, the 92 left the Lords on 29 April 2026.

The remaining two of those 92 held their seats by right of the hereditary offices of Earl Marshal and Lord Great Chamberlain. These offices are hereditary in themselves, and in recent times have been held by the Dukes of Norfolk and Baron Carrington, respectively. These were the only two hereditary peers whose right to sit was automatic.

The government reserved a number of political and ceremonial positions for hereditary peers. To encourage hereditary peers in the House of Lords to follow the party line, a number of lords-in-waiting (government whips) were usually hereditary peers. This practice was not adhered to by the Labour government of 1997–2010 due to the small number of Labour hereditary peers in the Lords.

=== Modern composition of the hereditary peerage ===
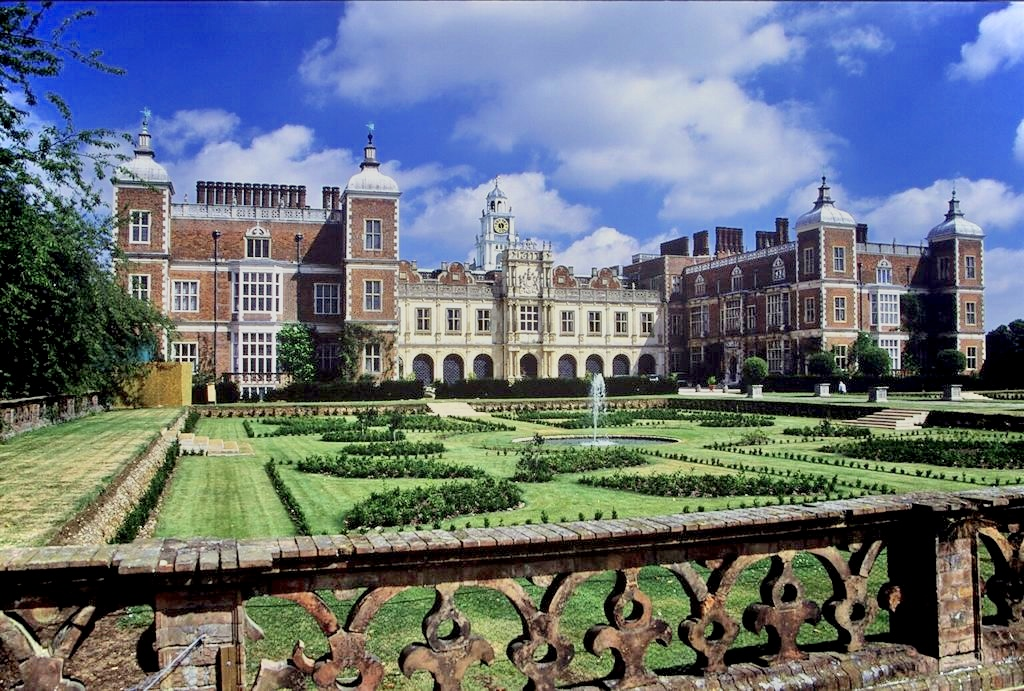
Many hereditary peers are associated with famous estates such as Hatfield House. Many notable estates are open to the public.

The peerage has traditionally been associated with high gentry, the British nobility, and in recent times, the Conservative Party. Only a tiny proportion of wealthy people are peers, but the peerage includes a few of the very wealthiest people in the UK, such as Hugh Grosvenor (the Duke of Westminster) and Lord Salisbury, and indeed the world in the case of David Thomson, 3rd Baron Thomson of Fleet.

A few peers own one or more of England's largest estates passed down through inheritance, particularly those with medieval roots: until the late 19th century the dominant English and Scottish land division on death was primogeniture.

The proliferation of peerage creations in the late 19th century and the first half of the 20th century resulted in even minor political figures entering the ranks of the peerage. These included newspaper owners (e.g. Alfred Harmsworth) and trade union leaders (e.g. Walter Citrine). As a result, there are many hereditary peers who have taken up careers which do not fit traditional conceptions of aristocracy.

For example, Arup Kumar Sinha, 6th Baron Sinha, is a computer technician working for a travel agency; Matt Ridley, 5th Viscount Ridley, is a popular science writer; Timothy Bentinck, 12th Earl of Portland, is an actor and plays David Archer in the BBC's long-running radio soap opera, The Archers; and Peter St Clair-Erskine, 7th Earl of Rosslyn, is a former Metropolitan Police Service Commander.

The Earl of Longford was a socialist and prison reformer. Tony Benn, who renounced his peerage as Viscount Stansgate, only for his son to use the family title after his death, was a senior government minister, later a writer and orator, with left-wing policies.

==== Gender distribution ====
As the vast majority of hereditary peerages can be inherited by only men, the number of peeresses in their own right is small. Eighteen out of 758 hereditary peers by succession, or 2.4%, were female, as of 1992. All female hereditary peers succeeding after 1980 have been to English or Scottish peerages originally created before 1700.

Of the over 800 hereditary peerages created since 1863, only 13 could be inherited by daughters of the original recipient. None can be inherited by granddaughters or higher-order female descendants of the original recipient. The 2nd Countess Mountbatten of Burma was the last woman to hold such a post-1900 title, from 1979 until her death in 2017.

From 1963, when female hereditary peers were allowed to enter the House of Lords, to 1999, there have been 25 female hereditary peers.

Of those 92 who sat in the House of Lords, none were female after the retirement of Margaret of Mar, 31st Countess of Mar, in 2020. Originally five female peers were elected under the House of Lords Act 1999, out of seven female candidates, all of them crossbenchers. All of these have since died or resigned.

No woman stood in a by-election to a vacant Lords seat after 1999. A single female peer, the 29th Baroness Dacre, was listed in the "Register of Hereditary Peers" among about 200 male peers as willing to stand in by-elections, as of October 2020.

== See also ==
- List of hereditary baronies in the Peerage of the United Kingdom
- List of excepted hereditary peers
- By-elections to the House of Lords
- List of hereditary peers in the House of Lords by virtue of a life peerage
- Reform of the House of Lords
- Roll of the Peerage
- Substantive title
- Writ of acceleration
- Hereditary Peerage Association
