= House of Lords (Hereditary Peers) Act 2026 =

UK law removing hereditary peerage from the House of Lords

- Act of Parliament
- Parliament of the United Kingdom
- Long title: An Act to remove the remaining connection between hereditary peerage and membership of the House of Lords; to make provision about resignation from the House of Lords; to abolish the jurisdiction of the House of Lords in relation to claims to hereditary peerages; and for connected purposes. (The short title is authorised by section 6 of the act.)
- Citation: 2026 c. 12
- Introduced by: Pat McFadden, Chancellor of the Duchy of Lancaster (Commons); Baroness Smith of Basildon, Leader of the House of Lords (Lords)
- Territorial extent: United Kingdom (Note: Section 5(1)–(2).)

Dates
- Royal assent: 18 March 2026
- Commencement: 18 March 2026 (s. 2, 5, 6); 29 April 2026 (s. 1, 3, 4) (Note: Section 5(3)–(4).)
Other legislation
Amends	Peerage Act 1963; House of Lords Act 1999; Constitutional Reform and Governance Act 2010; House of Lords Reform Act 2014

Status: Current legislation

History of passage through Parliament

Records of Parliamentary debate relating to the statute from Hansard

Text of statute as originally enacted

Revised text of statute as amended

The House of Lords (Hereditary Peers) Act 2026 (c. 12), sometimes referred to during passage as the Hereditary Peers Bill, is an act of the Parliament of the United Kingdom which removed all remaining hereditary peers from the House of Lords on 29 April 2026.

Hereditary peers who also held a life peerage had their membership in the House of Lords continue uninterrupted, and those excluded may rejoin the Lords should they be subsequently granted a life peerage. The earl marshal and lord great chamberlain, offices held by hereditary peers, lost their ex officio seats but continue to carry out their ceremonial duties.

For much of its history, most hereditary peers were entitled to sit in the House of Lords. This was abolished in the House of Lords Act 1999, retaining 92 excepted peers until further legislation could be enacted. House of Lords reform was proposed at the 2024 United Kingdom general election in the Labour Party manifesto, which included an age cap for life peers and the removal of hereditary peers entirely. Following 18 months of consideration before Parliament, the Commons and Lords agreed on the final text of the bill on 10 March 2026, with royal assent being granted to the bill on 18 March 2026. It fully came into force on 29 April 2026. As part of negotiations to obtain passage of the bill, an unspecified number of new life peerages were to be created to allow some hereditary peers to continue to be members of the House of Lords. In June 2026, approximately one-third of those peers excluded by the act were created life peers and returned to Parliament after a short hiatus.

== Background ==
Reform of the House of Lords has been a part of successive Government policy since the early 19th century. The last major change was made in the House of Lords Act 1999 under the first Blair ministry, which provided that:

No-one shall be a member of the House of Lords by virtue of a hereditary peerage.

— House of Lords Act 1999, section 1, Exclusion of hereditary peers.

The act then provided several exceptions, allowing 90 hereditary peers, as well as the Lord Great Chamberlain and the Earl Marshal, to remain in the House of Lords pending further reform. The act originally intended to exclude hereditary peers in their entirety, but the exceptions made (section 2 of the act) were reached as part of a compromise agreed between the Houses of Lords and the Commons during the bill's passage through Parliament.

== Provisions ==
The act excluded all the remaining 92 hereditary peers from Parliament, and they are no longer entitled to a seat in the chamber unless they are created life peers. The 26 Lords Spiritual and a variable number of life peers will remain sitting in the upper house. Although no longer members of the House of Lords, the Earl Marshal and Lord Great Chamberlain will continue to carry out their ceremonial duties.

The act also amends the House of Lords Reform Act 2014 to allow peers to resign in situations where they have lost mental capacity.

The sections of the act as adopted are listed below:

- Section 1: Exclusion of remaining hereditary peers. This section repeals section 2 of the House of Lords Act 1999, removing the exceptions for hereditary peers remaining in the House of Lords;
- Section 2: Retirement. This section allows a resignation notice to be signed and given on behalf of a peer who lacks capacity;
- Section 3: Claims to hereditary peerages. This section removes the House of Lords' jurisdiction over claims to hereditary peerages;
- Section 4: Consequential amendments;
- Section 5: Extent and commencement;
- Section 6: Short title.

Sections 2, 5 and 6 came into force upon royal assent on 18 March 2026, while sections 1, 3 and 4 came into force when the first session of the 59th Parliament was prorogued on 29 April 2026.

== Reactions ==
=== Opposition ===
The bill received criticism including from former Leader of the House of Lords and hereditary peer Lord Strathclyde, who suggested that so as to reduce the size of the House of Lords, peers who infrequently attend debates ought to be removed instead of the remaining hereditary peers, who have been very active.

Numerous members of the House of Lords have said that other elements of Lords reform should be prioritised, such as the abolition of the Lords Spiritual, pointing out that the only other sovereign state where clerics are automatically granted a legislative seat is Iran. Baroness Harman subsequently introduced an amendment that would mandate the government to introduce proposals to remove the right of the 26 Church of England bishops to sit ex officio as Lords Spiritual, in line with Labour's election manifesto commitment to consult on wider reforms of the upper house; she withdrew her amendment before debate. Lord Birt also introduced an amendment to require proposals to remove the Lords Spiritual, but he withdrew his amendment before debate. Viscount Hailsham introduced an amendment to remove the Lords Spiritual by phasing them out through retirement; he did not move his amendment at the committee stage debate.

=== Support ===
Minister of State for the Constitution and European Union Relations, Labour MP Nick Thomas-Symonds, said that "The second chamber plays a vital role in our constitution and people should not be voting on our laws in parliament by an accident of birth".

University College London Constitution Unit asserted that the only other country with a hereditary element in its legislature were the hereditary chiefs in Lesotho's Senate, though other countries have hereditary elements as well, such as the 18 chiefs in Zimbabwe's Senate, Tonga's 9 internally elected nobles in the Legislative Assembly, and Samoa's requirement to hold matai status to stand for election to the Legislative Assembly of Samoa.

== Passage ==
The bill was formally introduced to Parliament by the chancellor of the Duchy of Lancaster, Pat McFadden, receiving its first reading on Thursday, 5 September 2024, with its second reading on 15 October.

The bill proceeded to Committee Stage, where, due to its constitutional significance, it became subject to a Committee of the Whole House. The committee, and then the bill's third reading, took place on 12 November 2024 with the bill passing the House of Commons by a vote of 435–73.

Votes on committee amendments in the House of Commons
Amendment		Ayes	Noes	Result
A25	Would delay commencement until a report by a joint committee of the Commons and the Lords	98	376	Not accepted
NC1	Exclusion of bishops	41	378	Not accepted
NC7	Duty to take forward proposals for democratic mandate for House of Lords	93	355	Not accepted
NC20	Purpose of the bill	98	375	Not accepted

The bill was introduced into the House of Lords by the Leader of the House of Lords, Baroness Smith of Basildon, receiving its first reading in the on 13 November, and its second reading on 11 December. The bill was debated in five sittings at its Lords committee stage, on 3, 10, 12, and 25 March, and 1 April 2025, before moving to the report stage which was held in two sittings on 2 and 9 July 2025. The bill received its third reading on 21 July 2025. In addition to the three amendments accepted at the report stage, six amendments were accepted without a vote at the third reading. One of those six amendments was that a resignation notice from the House of Lords may be signed and given behalf of a peer who lacks capacity. 51 hours (9 days) of scrutiny were given in the House of Lords with a total of 146 amendments being tabled in committee, with 124 debated and a further 36 tabled in the report stage.

Votes on report stage amendments in the House of Lords
Amendment		Content	Not content	Result
2	Abolition of by-elections and allowing the current excepted hereditary peers to remain in the House of Lords	280	243	Accepted
4	Duty to take forward proposals for introducing directly elected members in the House of Lords	84	263	Not accepted
5	Life peerages not to be conferred against recommendation of the House of Lords Appointments Commission	55	234	Not accepted
13A	Requirement of all ministers in the House of Lords to be paid, except those appointed before the requirement comes into effect	284	239	Accepted
17	Life peerages to be created with or without a seat in the House of Lords	265	247	Accepted
23A	Duty to implement recommendations of the select committee on reforming the House of Lords	139	158	Not accepted
27	Duty to undertake a consultation on applying gender equality to determining hereditary peerage claims	11	126	Not accepted

The House of Commons consideration of the Lords' amendments took place on 4 September 2025. The House of Commons agreed without a vote the amendment that a resignation notice from the House of Lords may be signed and given on behalf of a peer who lacks capacity and four other amendments relating to the same issue, but other amendments were disagreed to.

Votes on disagreeing Lords' amendments in the House of Commons
Amendment		Ayes	Noes	Result
1	Abolition of by-elections and allowing the current excepted hereditary peers to remain in the House of Lords	336	77	Not accepted
2	Requirement of all ministers in the House of Lords to be paid, except those appointed before the requirement comes into effect	331	73	Not accepted
3	Life peerages to be created with or without a seat in the House of Lords	338	74	Not accepted

The House of Lords met to consider the Commons' amendments and reasons to disagree on 10 March 2026. The House of Lords did not insist on any amendment disagreed by the House of Commons.

BBC News reported on 10 March 2026 that the Conservative peers had withdrawn their opposition to the bill after Baroness Smith had confirmed that the government would be offering life peerages to an unspecified number of the hereditary Conservative and crossbench peers to be removed. The BBC understood that the Conservative peers had been offered fifteen such seats.

Royal assent on the bill was granted on 18 March 2026. It fully came into effect on 29 April 2026.

== Impacts ==
At the time Section 1 of the act came into force on 29 April 2026, there were 80 excepted hereditary peers in the House of Lords: of the 92 total seats provided for in legislation, 11 had become vacant by resignation, death or disqualification since May 2024 and not refilled due to a suspension of by-elections, while the ex officio seat of the Lord Great Chamberlain was held by Lord Carrington who held a "regular" excepted hereditary peer seat and thereby reduced the count by one. Three of the 80 sitting excepted hereditary peers (the Earl of Kinnoull, Lord Addington and Earl Russell) held concurrent life peerages and continued in the House uninterrupted, while the remaining 77 peers were excluded.

In May 2026 it was announced that 26 of the 77 excluded peers were to be given life peerages, which were created between 1 June and 17 June 2026. This returned approximately one-third of the excluded peers to Parliament after a short hiatus. As their hereditary peerages were created many decades—in some cases centuries—before their life peerages, they are considered "higher titles" in the Peerage of the United Kingdom; under Standing Order 7 of the House of Lords they continue to be referred to in Parliament by their hereditary titles despite being in the House by virtue of their life peerage.

== Future reform ==
The 2024 Labour Party manifesto provided a commitment to introduce an age limit for members of the House of Lords: "At the end of the Parliament in which a member reaches 80 years of age, they will be required to retire from the House of Lords. A Labour government would ensure all peers met high standards, would introduce a new participation requirement, and would strengthen the circumstances in which disgraced members could be removed. It would also reform the appointments process, to ensure quality, and would seek to improve the national and regional balance of the chamber."

There is some support amongst peers for a measure to strengthen the powers of the House of Lords Appointments Commission.

The Labour Party also conceives a longer term plan (beyond 2029) to replace the upper house with an "alternative" second chamber.

== See also ==
- Constitutional reform in the United Kingdom
- Peerages in the United Kingdom
- Roll of the Peerage
