= Lists of members of the House of Lords =

The following are lists of members of the House of Lords:

- List of current members of the House of Lords
- List of life peerages
- List of excepted hereditary peers
- List of former members of the House of Lords (2000–present)
- List of hereditary peers removed under the House of Lords Act 1999
