= Clan Colville =

Lowland Scottish clan

- Motto: Oblier ne puis (I cannot forget)

Chief
- Charles Colville
- The Rt Hon The Viscount Colville of Culross
- Historic seat: Kinnaird Castle
Rival clans
Clan Douglas

Clan Colville is a Lowland Scottish clan.

== History ==
=== Origins of the Clan ===
Ancestral Colville arms: Argent a cross moline sable

The Clan Colville chiefs are of ancient Norman origin. The name is probably derived from the town of Colville in Normandy. The first of the name to appear in Scotland was Philip de Colville who is found as a witness to a charter to Dunfermline Monastery some time before 1159. In 1174 Phillip de Colville was one of the hostages used for the release of William the Lion under the Treaty of Falaise. Phillip was also granted the baronies of Oxnam and Hecton in Roxburghshire as well as lands in Ayrshire. Phillip's son was Thomas de Colville who between 1189 and 1199 was a witness to several charters of William the Lion. Thomas was unjustly suspected of treason and was imprisoned in Edinburgh Castle but he later regained royal favor and died on his own estates in 1219. Thomas's son was William de Colville who acquired the barony of Kinnaird in Stirlingshire which remains the chief's seat to this day. In 1228 William de Colville granted a lease of the part of his barony to the Abbot of Holyrood which was confirmed in a charter by Alexander II of Scotland.

The heiress of Sir William Colville was E'stace. She was married to Sir Reginald Cheyne, an elderly knight who died in about 1291, leaving her considerable wealth. E'stace appears on the Ragman Rolls of 1296 swearing fealty to Edward I of England. She is recorded on the Ragman Rolls as holding lands in Aberdeen, Ayr, Banff, Forfar, Inverness and Kincardine. The foundation of the fortunes of the Colvilles is attributed to E'stace's considerable abilities by Alexander Nisbet.

=== 14th and 15th centuries ===
A grant made to Melrose Abbey by E'stace de Colville was confirmed in 1324 by Robert Colville who is described as Baro baronial de Ochiltree which means Baron of the barony of Ochiltree. The baron made donations to the monks of Kelso Abbey and his barony of Ochiltree was confirmed by David II of Scotland in 1350.

In 1436 Thomas Colville of Oxnam, who was probably Robert's grandson, was selected to accompany Princess Margaret, daughter of James I of Scotland for her marriage to the Dauphin of France, later Louis XI of France. Robert Colville had also been one of the hostages for the release of James I from English captivity four years earlier.

Sir Richard (or Robert Colville) killed John Auchinleck in 1449. Auchinleck was a favourite of the Earl of Douglas (chief of Clan Douglas) and to avenge Auchinleck's fate, Douglas laid waste to all of the lands that belonged to Colville and besieged and took his Kinnaird Castle, with a great loss of life.

=== 16th and 17th centuries ===
In 1513 Robert Colville of Hilton was killed at the Battle of Flodden. His son was Sir James Colville of Ochiltree who in 1527 was appointed to the office of Comptroller of the Royal Household. In 1530 he exchanged his lands of Ochiltree for the lands of East Wemyss and Lochorshyre with Hamilton of Finnart. He was appointed a judge of the Supreme Court as Sir James Colville of Easter Wemyss. However he was later accused of treason and his estates were annexed by the Crown, but in 1543 the forfeiture was recalled.

Sir James Colville, third of Easter Wemyss was a distinguished soldier who fought in France for the Prince of Navarre, later Henry IV of France. In 1582 he returned to Scotland with Francis Stewart, 5th Earl of Bothwell, loaded with commendations from his French patrons. In 1604 Sir James Colville was raised in the peerage with the title 'Lord Colville of Culross', which the chiefs still bear today. The second Lord Colville died without issue in 1640 leaving the title to his cousin as heir. However his cousin did not assume the title and it remained dormant until 1723.

=== 18th century ===
==== European Wars ====
In 1709 John Colville, de jure seventh Lord Colville, served as a soldier at the Battle of Malplaquet which was a great victory for John Churchill, 1st Duke of Marlborough. He was made heir to the second Lord Colville in 1722, but a petition to the king claiming the Peerage was referred to the House of Lords for an enquiry. In 1723 the House found in favour of Colville, who was placed on the Roll of Peers. He continued his military career and commanded a battalion at the siege of Cartagena, where he died in 1741. Colville left a large family who all had successful military careers.

==== Jacobite risings ====
During the Jacobite rising of 1745 Charles Colville supported the British Government and commanded the 21st Regiment of Foot (Royal Scots Fusiliers) at the Battle of Culloden in 1746. He died in 1775 having achieved the rank of lieutenant general.

==== Seven Years' War ====
In 1731 Alexander Colville, 7th Lord Colville of Culross joined the Navy. He soon obtained his own command and by in 1744 became captain of HMS Leopard (1741), a fifty gun frigate. He was later promoted to commodore and obtained command of HMS Northumberland (1750) and sailed to America in 1755 during the Seven Years' War. In 1759 Colville forced the French to raise the siege of Quebec and retreat. In 1769 Colville was promoted to the rank of Vice Admiral.

=== 19th and 20th centuries ===
Charles Colville served with distinction during the Peninsular War and also at the Battle of Waterloo. His two elder brothers died without issue and so his son, Charles Colville, 1st Viscount Colville of Culross, succeeded to the peerage. This Charles Colville was Chief Equerry to Queen Victoria and Lord Chamberlain to Queen Alexandra of Denmark. He was created Viscount Colville of Culross in 1902.

The brother of the second Viscount was Sir Stanley Colville who was rear admiral and commander in chief at Portsmouth between 1916 and 1919. Stanley Colville received some of the country's highest honors, including Grand Cross of the Order of the Bath.

== The Clan today ==
Mark Colville, 4th Viscount Colville of Culross, gained the title in 1945, and served as a Home Office Minister under Edward Heath and was a member of the UN Human Rights Commission. He died in 2010 and was succeeded by his son, Charles Colville, 5th Viscount Colville of Culross, a member of the House of Lords who is currently the Clan Chief.

== See also ==
- Scottish clan
- Viscount Colville of Culross
