= Leopard (disambiguation) =

The leopard (Panthera pardus) is one of the five "big cats" in the genus Panthera.

Leopard may also refer to:

== Biology ==
- Amur leopard (Panthera pardus orientalis), related species of Northeast Asia
- Snow leopard or ounce (Panthera uncia), related species of Central Asia
- Clouded leopard (Neofelis nebulosa), related species of South/Southeast Asia
- Sunda clouded leopard (Neofelis diardi), related species of Sumatra and Borneo
- Leopard cat (Prionailurus bengalensis), wildcat species of Southeast Asia
- Sunda leopard cat (Prionailurus javanensis), wildcat species of the Sundaland islands
- Leopard (pattern), the spotting pattern characteristic of Leopards
- Leopard complex, the genetic allele responsible for leopard-spotting in horses
- LEOPARD syndrome, a rare autosomal dominant multisystem disease, associated with high numbers of surface skin lesions
- Leopard (butterfly) (Phalanta), a genus of insects
- Leopard gecko (Eublepharis macularius), a species of gecko native to South Asia

== Military ==
- VK 16.02 Leopard, a German light tank design during World War II that did not see production.
- Leopard 1, a German main battle tank (1965-)
- Leopard 2, a third-generation German main battle tank (1979-), used by the armed forces of Germany and several other countries
- Leopard 2E or Leopardo 2A6E, a Spanish variant of the German Leopard 2 tank.
- Leopard (rocket), a British rocket
- HMS Leopard, several Royal Navy ships
- French destroyer Léopard, a warship of World War II
- SMS Leopard, an Austro-Hungarian torpedo cruiser

== Transportation ==
- South Devon Railway Leopard class, a South Devon Railway 4-4-0ST steam locomotive, and the class of similar locomotives
- Leopard 6 Litre Roadster, luxury car designed by Polish designer for Sweden-based company
- Nissan Leopard, Japanese luxury sports car
- Leyland Leopard, a bus
- SS Leopard, one of the blockade runners of the American Civil War
- CMC Leopard, a defunct British light personal business jet developed in the 1980s as two prototypes

== Computing ==
- Mac OS X Leopard, the sixth major release of Apple's Mac OS X operating system
- DR-DOS, code-name "Leopard" of Digital Research's DR DOS 5.0

== Other uses ==
- Leopard (heraldry), a heraldic beast
- Leopard-Trek, the former name of a UCI WorldTour cycling team, now known as Trek Factory Racing
- Leopard Development Team, a UCI Continental cycling team
- Leopard Racing, a motorcycle racing team
- Half Florin or Leopard, English coin of Edward III
- Leopard, a local monthly magazine based in Aberdeen, Scotland
- Leopard Inn, a former pub in Stoke-on-Trent, England, see Burslem#Leopard Inn

== See also ==
- Leopardus, a genus of small spotted cats
- Leopards (disambiguation)
- Leopardi (disambiguation)
- The Leopard (disambiguation)
  - The Leopard (1963 film), by Luchino Visconti
