= Admiral Colville =

Admiral Colville may refer to:

- Alexander Colville, 7th Lord Colville of Culross (1717–1770), British Royal Navy vice admiral
- John Colville, 9th Lord Colville of Culross (1768–1849), British Royal Navy admiral
- Stanley Colville (1861–1939), British Royal Navy admiral
