= Leopardi (disambiguation) =

Leopardi is an Italian word meaning "Leopards". It is also a surname of Italian origin. It may refer to:

== People ==
Giacomo Leopardi and family

- Giacomo Leopardi (1798–1837), Italian poet, essayist, philosopher, and philologist.
- Adelaide Antici Leopardi (1778–1857), mother of Giacomo.
- Monaldo Leopardi (1776–1847), Italian philosopher and writer, father of Giacomo.
- Paolina Leopardi (1800–1869), sister of Giacomo.

Other Leopardi

- Alessandro Leopardi (14..-1522/23), Italian sculptor.
- Chauncey Leopardi (b. 1981), American television and film actor.
- Eric Christopher Leopardi (b. 1988), American television producer and director.
- Francesco Antonio Leopardi (1635–1717), Roman Catholic prelate.
- Giacomo Leopardi (politician) (b. 1928), Italian politician.
- Marcello Leopardi (1750 ca.-1795), Italian painter.
- Orlando Leopardi (1902-19..), Italian boxer.
- Pier Silvestro Leopardi (1797-1870), Italian politician and patriot.
- Roberto Leopardi (b. 1933), Uruguayan footballer.

== Other ==
- Leopardi (film), a 2014 Italian film
- Leopardi (ferry), Italian ferry active between 1978 and 1994.
- Leopardi (Torre del Greco), Italian civil parish of Torre del Greco (NA), Campania
- 8081 Leopardi, main-belt asteroid
- Leopardi (crater), a crater on Mercury

== See also ==
- Leopard (disambiguation)
- Leopards (disambiguation)
