= Viscount Colville of Culross =

Viscountcy in the Peerage of the United Kingdom

Viscount Colville of Culross, in the County of Perth, is a title in the Peerage of the United Kingdom. It was created on 15 July 1902 for the politician and courtier, Charles Colville, 10th Lord Colville of Culross. He had already been created Baron Colville of Culross, in the County of Perth, in 1885, also in the Peerage of the United Kingdom. As of 2018, the titles are held by his great-great-grandson, the fifth Viscount, who succeeded his father in 2010. The fourth Viscount was a judge and politician. Lord Colville of Culross was one of the ninety elected hereditary peers that remained in the House of Lords after the passing of the House of Lords Act 1999, and sat as a crossbencher.

The title of Lord Colville of Culross was created in the Peerage of Scotland in 1604 for Sir James Colville, with remainder to his heirs male whatsoever. The title descended among his male heirs until the death of his grandson, the fourth Lord, in c. 1680. He was succeeded by his fourth cousin Alexander Colville, the fifth Lord. His grandson, the seventh Lord, was a distinguished naval commander. His nephew, the ninth Lord, was an Admiral of the White and also sat in the House of Lords as a Scottish representative peer from 1818 to 1849. He was succeeded by his nephew, the aforementioned tenth Lord, who was elevated to a viscountcy in 1902.

Admiral Sir Stanley Colville (1861–1939) was the second son of the 1st Viscount. The diarist Sir John "Jock" Colville (1915–1987) was the third son of the third son of the 1st Viscount.

"Culross" is pronounced Coo-ros. It is a historic village on the Firth of Forth; it was transferred to in Fife in 1891, and some of its buildings are maintained by the National Trust for Scotland. The titles emanate from an historic Colville connection to Culross Abbey and the Abbot of Culross. The first Lord Colville was awarded the lands of Culross Abbey in June 1592 and its title by James VI, rewarded for services to the Crown especially as a diplomat abroad in religious causes.

The family seat was Worlingham Hall, near Beccles, Suffolk.

== Lord Colville of Culross (1604) ==
- James Colville, 1st Lord Colville of Culross (1551–1629)
- James Colville, 2nd Lord Colville of Culross (1604–1654)
- William Colville, 3rd Lord Colville of Culross (died 1656)
- John Colville, 4th Lord Colville of Culross (died c. 1680)
- Alexander Colville, 5th Lord Colville of Culross (1666–1717)
- John Colville, 6th Lord Colville of Culross (1690–1741)
- Alexander Colville, 7th Lord Colville of Culross (1717–1770)
- John Colville, 8th Lord Colville of Culross (1725–1811)
- John Colville, 9th Lord Colville of Culross (1768–1849)
- Charles John Colville, 10th Lord Colville of Culross (1818–1903) (created Baron Colville of Culross in 1885)

=== Baron Colville of Culross (1885) ===
- Charles John Colville, 1st Baron Colville of Culross (1818–1903) (created Viscount Colville of Culross in 1902)

=== Viscount Colville of Culross (1902) ===
- Charles John Colville, 1st Viscount Colville of Culross (1818–1903)
- Charles Robert William Colville, 2nd Viscount Colville of Culross (1854–1928)
- Charles Alexander Colville, 3rd Viscount Colville of Culross (1888–1945)
- (John) Mark Alexander Colville, 4th Viscount Colville of Culross (1933–2010)
- Charles Mark Townshend Colville, 5th Viscount Colville of Culross (born 1959)

The heir presumptive is the present holder's brother, the Hon. Richmond James Innys Colville (born 1961)
The heir presumptive's heir apparent is his son, Alexander Richmond Philip Colville (born 1995)

=== Title succession chart ===
Title succession chart, Lords, Barons and Viscounts Colville of Culross.

Sir James Colville died 1540
Sir James Colville; 1532–1561	Alexander Colville a. 1536 – 1597
Lord Colville of Culross
James Colville; 1st Lord Colville of Culross; 1551–1629	John Colville; 1573 – bt. 1645/1650
Robert Colville; Master of Colville died 1614	Unknown son	Rev. Alexander Colville; 1610–1676
James Colville; 2nd Lord Colville of Culross; 1604–1654	Rev. John Colville; 1640 – c. 1677/1678
William Colville; 3rd Lord Colville of Culross died 1656	John Colville; 4th Lord Colville of Culross died c. 1680	Alexander Colville; 5th Lord Colville of Culross; 1666–1717
John Colville; 6th Lord Colville of Culross; 1690–1741
Alexander Colville; 7th Lord Colville of Culross; 1717–1770	John Colville; 8th Lord Colville of Culross; 1725–1811
James Colville; Master of Colville; 1763–1786	John Colville; 9th Lord Colville of Culross; 1768–1849	Gen. Hon. Sir Charles Colville; 1770–1843
Baron Colville of Culross; Viscount Colville of Culross
Charles Colville; 1st Viscount Colville of Culross; 10th Lord Colville of Culross; 1818–1903
Charles Colville; 2nd Viscount Colville of Culross; 1854–1928
Charles Colville; 3rd Viscount Colville of Culross; 1888–1945
Mark Colville; 4th Viscount Colville of Culross; 1933–2010
Charles Colville; 5th Viscount Colville of Culross; 14th Lord Colville of Culross born 1959	Hon. Richmond Colville born 1961
Hon. Alexander Colville born 1995

=== Line of succession ===
Line of succession
- Charles John Colville, 1st Viscount Colville of Culross (1818–1903)
  - Charles Robert William Colville, 2nd Viscount Colville of Culross (1854–1928)
    - Charles Alexander Colville, 3rd Viscount Colville of Culross (1888–1945)
      - (John) Mark Alexander Colville, 4th Viscount Colville of Culross (1933–2010)
        - Charles Mark Townshend Colville, 5th Viscount Colville of Culross (born 1959)
        - (1) Hon. Richmond James Innys Colville, Master of Colville (born 1961)
          - (2) Alexander Colville (born 1995)
          - (3) Oliver Colville (born 1996)
        - (4) Hon. Alexander Fergus Gale Colville (born 1964)
        - (5) Hon. Rupert George Streatfeild Colville (born 1966)
        - (6) Hon. Edmund Carleton Colville (born 1978)
      - (7) Hon. Charles Anthony Colville (born 1935)
        - (8) Robert Quintin Oxnam Colville (born 1971)
        - (9) Charles Alexander Colville (born 1974)
  - Adm. Hon. Sir Stanley Cecil James Colville (1861–1939)
    - Cdr. Sir Richard Colville (1907–1975)
      - Peter Alan Colville (1935–2004)
        - (10) James Richard Colville (born 1976)
  - Hon. George Charles Colville (1867–1943)
    - David Richard Colville (1909–1987)
      - (11) Robert John Colville (born 1941)
      - (12) James Richard Charles Colville (born 1952)
        - (13) Charles David James Colville (born 1987)
        - (14) Edward Timothy George Colville (born 1988)
    - Sir John Rupert "Jock" Colville (1915–1987)
      - (15) Rupert Charles Colville (born 1960)

== Arms ==
Coat of arms of Viscount Colville of Culross

Crest
A hind's head couped at the neck Argent.
Escutcheon
Quarterly 1st & 4th Argent a cross moline Sable (Colville) 2nd & 3rd Gules a fess chequy Argent and Azure (Lindsay).
Supporters
Dexter a rhinoceros Proper (sinister) a savage habited in a bearskin and supporting on his left shoulder with his exterior hand a club all Proper.
Motto
Oublier Ne Puis (I Cannot Forget)

== See also ==
- Clan Colville
