= HMS Leopard =

Eleven vessels of the British Royal Navy have been named HMS Leopard after the leopard:

- English ship Leopard (1635) was a 34-gun ship launched in 1635 and captured by the Dutch in 1653.
- English ship Leopard (1659) was a 54-gun ship launched in 1659, hulked from 1686, and sunk as a breakwater in 1699. John Tyrrell was lieutenant on this ship in 1672.
- HMS Leopard (1672) was a 6-gun fireship purchased in 1672 and expended the following year at the Battle of Texel.
- HMS Leopard (1703) was a 54-gun fourth rate launched in 1703, rebuilt 1721, and broken up 1739.
- HMS Leopard (1741) was a 50-gun fourth rate in service from 1741 to 1761.
- HMS Leopard (1790), famous for her role in the Chesapeake-Leopard Affair, was a 50-gun fourth rate launched in 1790, a troopship from 1812, and wrecked 1814.
- HMS Leopard (1794) was a 4-gun vessel formerly a Dutch hoy, purchased 1794 and sold 1808.
- HMS Leopard (1850) was a wooden-hulled paddle frigate, launched 1850 and sold 1867.
- HMS Leopard (1897) was a C-class destroyer in service from 1897 to 1919.
- Leopard, launched in 1927, was a French Chacal-class destroyer, seized in 1940, transferred to the Free French forces and wrecked off Benghazi on 27 May 1943.
- HMS Leopard (F14), launched in 1955, was the lead ship of her class of frigates. She was broken up in 1977.
