= Leopards (disambiguation) =

Leopards are members of the family Felidae.

Leopards may also refer to:

- AC Léopards, a football club from the Republic of Congo
- A.F.C. Leopards, a Kenyan football club
- African Leopards, an African rugby union representative team
- Cincinnati Leopards, an American women's soccer club
- Dongguan Leopards, a Chinese basketball team, now Shenzhen Aviators
- Essex Leopards, a British basketball team from 2004, also known as Essex & Herts Leopards and London Leopards
  - Essex Leopards (1994–2003)
- Golf Leopards F.C., a Sierra Leonean football club
- Guangdong Leopards, a Chinese baseball team
- Islamabad Leopards, a Pakistani domestic cricket team
- Lafayette Leopards, 23 varsity athletic teams of Lafayette College, Pennsylvania, U.S.
- Leigh Leopards, an English rugby league club
- Leopardos de Santa Clara ('Santa Clara Leopards'), a Cuban baseball team
- Leopards (rugby union), a South African rugby team
- Léopards de Transfoot, a Madagascan football club
- Lewisville Leopards, an American basketball team
- Liaoning Flying Leopards, a Chinese basketball team
- Liverpool Leopards, an English ice hockey club
- Nakambala Leopards F.C., a Zambian football club
- Nangarhar Leopards, an Afghan franchise cricket team
- Otahuhu Leopards, a New Zealand rugby league club
- SAARB Leopards (rugby union), a South African rugby team
- Sochi Leopards, nickname of HC Sochi, a Russian ice hockey team
- Tamaki Leopards, later Tamaki Titans, a New Zealand rugby league team
- Villeneuve Leopards, nickname of Villeneuve XIII RLLG, a French rugby league club

== See also ==
- Leopard (disambiguation)
- Leopardi (disambiguation)
