= 1995 USWISL season =

Soccer season

USL W-League
- Season: 1995
- Champions: Long Island Lady Riders (1st title)
- Regular Season title: Long Island Lady Riders (1st title)
- Matches: 157
- Goals: 327 (2.08 per match)
- Top goalscorer: Charmaine Hooper (31 goals)

The 1995 USWISL, also known as the 1995 Nike W League for sponsorship reasons, was the inaugural season of the United States Women's Interregional Soccer League (USWISL), which later became the USL W-League. Operated by the USISL, it was the highest division of women's soccer in the United States at the time. The Long Island Lady Riders were crowned champions after defeating the Southern California Nitemares in the Championship game.

== Background ==
In December 1993, it was announced that the USISL had committed to establishing the first US-wide women's soccer league, and that it would begin operations in 1995. In 1994, in preparation for the following year, around eighteen teams were established with the purpose of playing a few exhibition games with each other under the USISL umbrella. Five of these teams were then invited to a final tournament in Trinity, North Carolina, which was won by the Sacramento Storm, who defeated the Greensboro Dynamo 1–0 in the Championship game.

The league was originally meant to include 20 teams, but only 19 entered the competition; moreover, the Wichita Lady Blues and the Tulsa Roughnecks folded early in the year, thus bringing the number of competing teams down to 17, divided into three divisions (Eastern, Central, and Western).

== Competition format ==
The league did not follow the standard FIFA points system; instead, points were awarded as follows:

- Regulation win (W) = 6 points
- Shootout win (SW) = 4 points
- Shootout loss (SL) = 2 points
- Regulation loss (L) = 0 points
- Bonus points (BP): An additional one point per goal, up to a maximum of three points per game.

== League standings ==
=== Eastern Division ===
Pos	Team	Pld	W	L	SW	SL	GF	GA	GD	Pts	BP
1	Long Island Lady Riders (C)	10	9	1	1	0	30	11	+19	78	26
2	Pennsylvania Freedom	10	7	3	1	1	11	10	+1	53	11
3	Connecticut Lady Wolves	10	6	4	1	1	16	16	0	52	16
4	Mass Bay Crusaders	10	6	4	2	1	20	14	+6	49	15
5	Boston Tornado	10	4	6	0	2	16	17	−1	44	16
6	Baltimore Lady Bays	9	4	5	0	0	16	14	+2	37	13
7	Hampton Roads Piranhas	9	0	6	0	0	7	26	−19	7	7
8	Rhode Island Stingrays	9	0	9	0	0	2	22	−20	2	2

=== Central Division ===
Pos	Team	Pld	W	L	SW	SL	GF	GA	GD	Pts	BP
1	Rockford Dactyls	9	8	1	0	0	38	5	+33	72	24
2	Texas Lightning	8	6	2	0	0	31	12	+19	56	20
3	Columbus Ziggx	9	5	4	0	0	22	26	−4	49	19
4	Cincinnati Leopards	10	5	5	0	0	24	26	−2	47	17
5	Tulsa Roughnecks	0	0	0	0	0	0	0	0	0	0
6	Wichita Lady Blues	0	0	0	0	0	0	0	0	0	0

=== Western Division ===
Pos	Team	Pld	W	L	SW	SL	GF	GA	GD	Pts	BP
1	Southern California Nitemares	9	7	2	0	0	31	12	+19	64	22
2	San Francisco Vikings	9	7	2	0	0	20	12	+8	62	20
3	Sacramento Storm	9	5	4	0	0	22	17	+5	49	17
4	San Diego Lady Top Guns	9	2	7	0	1	16	20	−4	24	10
5	Arizona Heatwave	8	2	6	1	0	5	25	−20	15	5

== Sizzlin' Six Tournament ==
The Sizzlin' Six Tournament took place in Cincinnati, Ohio from August 11 to August 13, 1995. The Cincinnati Leopards qualified automatically as the hosts of the tournament. Having won their respective divisions, the Long Island Lady Riders (Eastern), the Rockford Dactyls (Central), and the Southern California Nitemares (Western) also qualified for the tournament. The Pennsylvania Freedom and the Texas Lightning, who finished second in the Eastern and Central divisions respectively, took the remaining two spots.

The six qualified teams played in a modified round-robin tournament, with each team playing games on August 11 and 12 against two non-division opponents. The Championship game was played on August 13, 1995.

August 11, 1995

Southern California Nitemares	3 − 0	(Illinois) Rockford Dactyls
	Report

August 11, 1995

Texas Lightning	1 − 0	Pennsylvania Freedom
	Report

August 11, 1995

(New York (state)) Long Island Lady Riders	1 − 0	(Ohio) Cincinnati Leopards
Grossman 1'	Report

August 12, 1995

(New York (state)) Long Island Lady Riders	2 − 0	Texas Lightning
Sepe 47'	Report

August 12, 1995

(Illinois) Rockford Dactyls	2 − 1	Pennsylvania Freedom
	Report

August 12, 1995

Southern California Nitemares	2 − 0	(Ohio) Cincinnati Leopards
	Report

=== Championship ===
August 13, 1995

(New York (state)) Long Island Lady Riders	2 − 0	Southern California Nitemares
Vassallo-Tucker 40', 70'	Report

Deer Park High School
Cincinnati, Ohio

== Statistical leaders ==
=== Top scorers ===
Rank	Player	Club	Goals
1	Charmaine Hooper	Rockford Dactyls	31
2	Diane McLoughlin	Long Island Lady Riders	19
3	Jennifer Evans	Southern California Nitemares	18
4	Janette Javit	Texas Lightning	17
5	Erica Handelman	Rockford Dactyls	15
6	Jennifer Shannon	Cincinnati Leopards	14
7	Paula Russo	Boston Tornado	13
8	Kara Lee	Texas Lightning	11
8	Lori Hokerson	Sacramento Storm	11
10	Caitlin Connolly	Long Island Lady Riders	9

== Awards ==
- Scoring Champion: Charmaine Hooper (Rockford Dactyls)
- Most Valuable Player: Laurie Hill (Southern California Nitemares)
- Coach of the Year: Peter Collins Jr. (Long Island Lady Riders)
- Goalkeeper of the Year: Kim Wyant (Long Island Lady Riders)
- Sizzlin' Six Tournament Offensive MVP: Gina Vassallo-Tucker (Long Island Lady Riders)
- Sizzlin' Six Tournament Defensive MVP: Kim Conway (Long Island Lady Riders)
