= Phalanta philiberti =

Scientific classification
- Domain: Eukaryota
- Kingdom: Animalia
- Phylum: Arthropoda
- Class: Insecta
- Order: Lepidoptera
- Family: Nymphalidae
- Genus: Phalanta
- Species: P. philiberti

Binomial name
- Phalanta philiberti (de Joannis, 1893)

Synonyms
- Atella philiberti de Joannis, 1893; Atella seychellarum Holland, 1896

Species of butterfly

Phalanta philiberti is a butterfly in the family Nymphalidae. It is found on the Seychelles, where it has not been collected since 1953.
