= Laurie Hill (footballer, born 1970) =

American-born Mexican retired footballer

Personal information
- Full name: Laurie Anne Hill Rozenel
- Birth name: Laurie Anne Hill
- Date of birth: February 11, 1970 (age 56)
- Place of birth: Los Angeles, California, United States
- Height: 5 ft 1 in (1.55 m)
- Position: Midfielder

College career
Years	Team	Apps	(Gls)
1988–1991	UC Santa Barbara	74	(27)

International career
- Mexico

Laurie Anne Hill Rozenel (born 11 February 1970) is a retired footballer who played as a midfielder. Born in the United States, she represented the Mexico women's national team.

== Early life and education ==
Hill was born on February 11, 1970, in Los Angeles, California, and was raised in the same area. Her mother was born in Mexico City, Mexico to American parents. Hill attended the University of California, Santa Barbara and was a student-athlete on the UC Santa Barbara Gauchos women's soccer team. Hill became UC Santa Barbara's career leader in minutes played (6,422) and was named a three-time All American from 1989 through 1991. Following her UCSB career, she was inducted into the UC Santa Barbara Athletics Hall of Fame.

== Career ==
Hill played for the Southern California Nitemares as a teenager. After she graduated from UC Santa Barbara, she went to Japan to play professionally for a year before returning to Southern California.

Hill rejoined the Nitemares in 1995 as they became a founding member of the USL W-League. For the 1995 W-League season, Hill was named the league's first MVP. She also featured for the Sacramento Storm.

Following the 1999 Women's World Cup, Hill was selected to be a part of a traveling exhibition against the United States Women's National Team. She would later be drafted to the Women's United Soccer Association's Philadelphia Charge in the 15th round of the 2000 WUSA Draft. She quit playing soccer before the Charge played their first game after deciding to focus on a nursing career.

=== International career ===
Hill, being American-born and raised, attempted to join the United States women's national soccer team. She never made an appearance for the team.

After a series of changes in Mexican laws, Hill was eligible to attempt to join the Mexico women's national football team before the 1999 FIFA Women's World Cup. After the Mexico national team played a scrimmage against the Sacramento Storm, Hill, who played for the Storm, approached the Mexican officials about joining the team.

Hill successfully joined the team for their first Women's World Cup appearance and was one of over half of the 20–player roster with American ties. Hill served as a co-captain for the team and appeared in all three group matches.

== Personal life ==
Hill was nicknamed "The Thrill" after her play on the field. After soccer, she met her husband, Johnny, in the Summer 2001 and moved to Ireland. She works in nursing and is a mother to three children.
