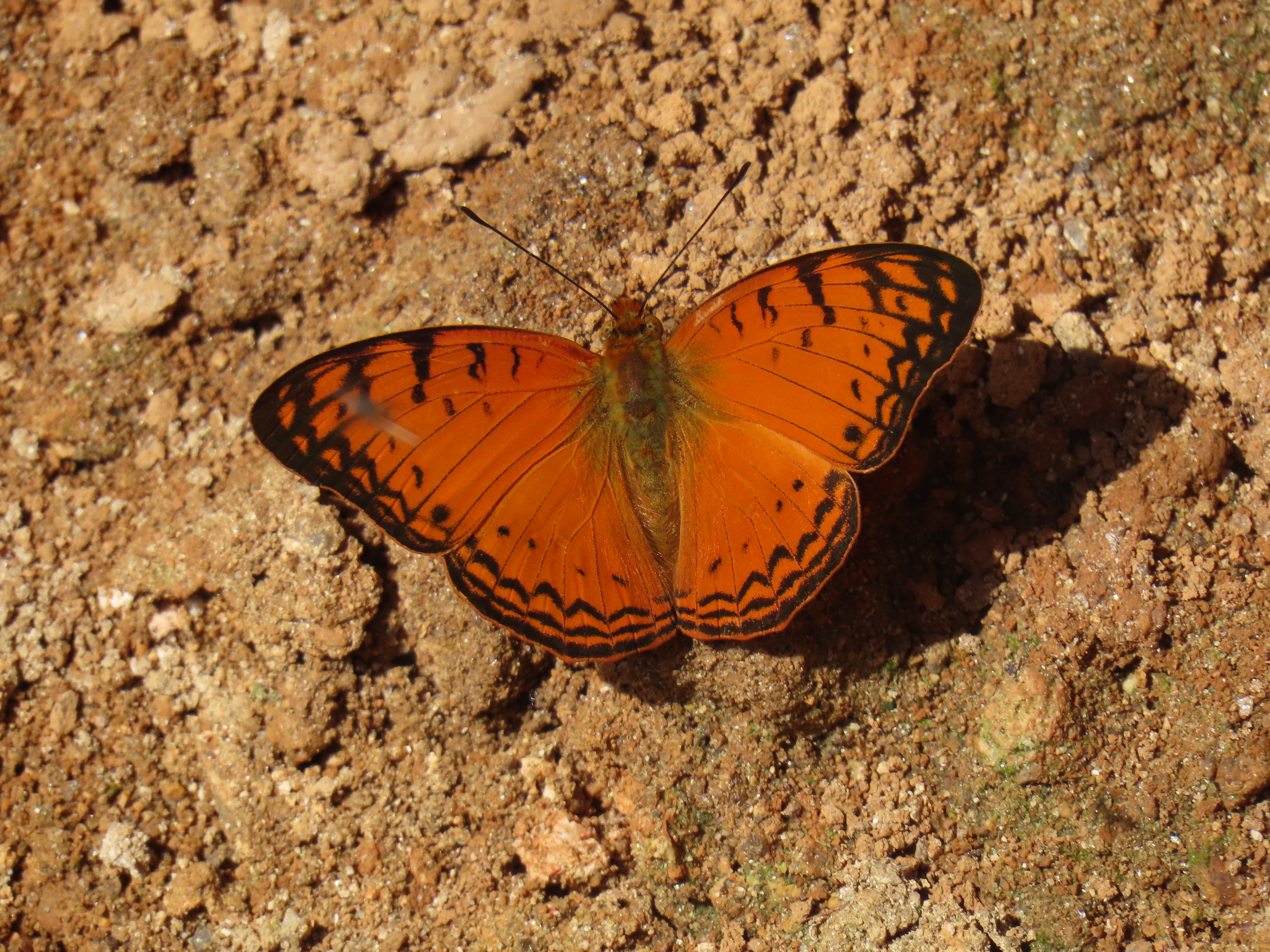
- Phalanta madagascariensis at Maromizaha Forest

Scientific classification
- Domain: Eukaryota
- Kingdom: Animalia
- Phylum: Arthropoda
- Class: Insecta
- Order: Lepidoptera
- Family: Nymphalidae
- Genus: Phalanta
- Species: P. madagascariensis

Binomial name
- Phalanta madagascariensis (Mabille, 1887)

Synonyms
- Atella madagascariensis Mabille, 1887

= Phalanta madagascariensis =

Species of butterfly

Phalanta madagascariensis is a butterfly in the family Nymphalidae. It is found on Madagascar. The habitat consists of forests.
