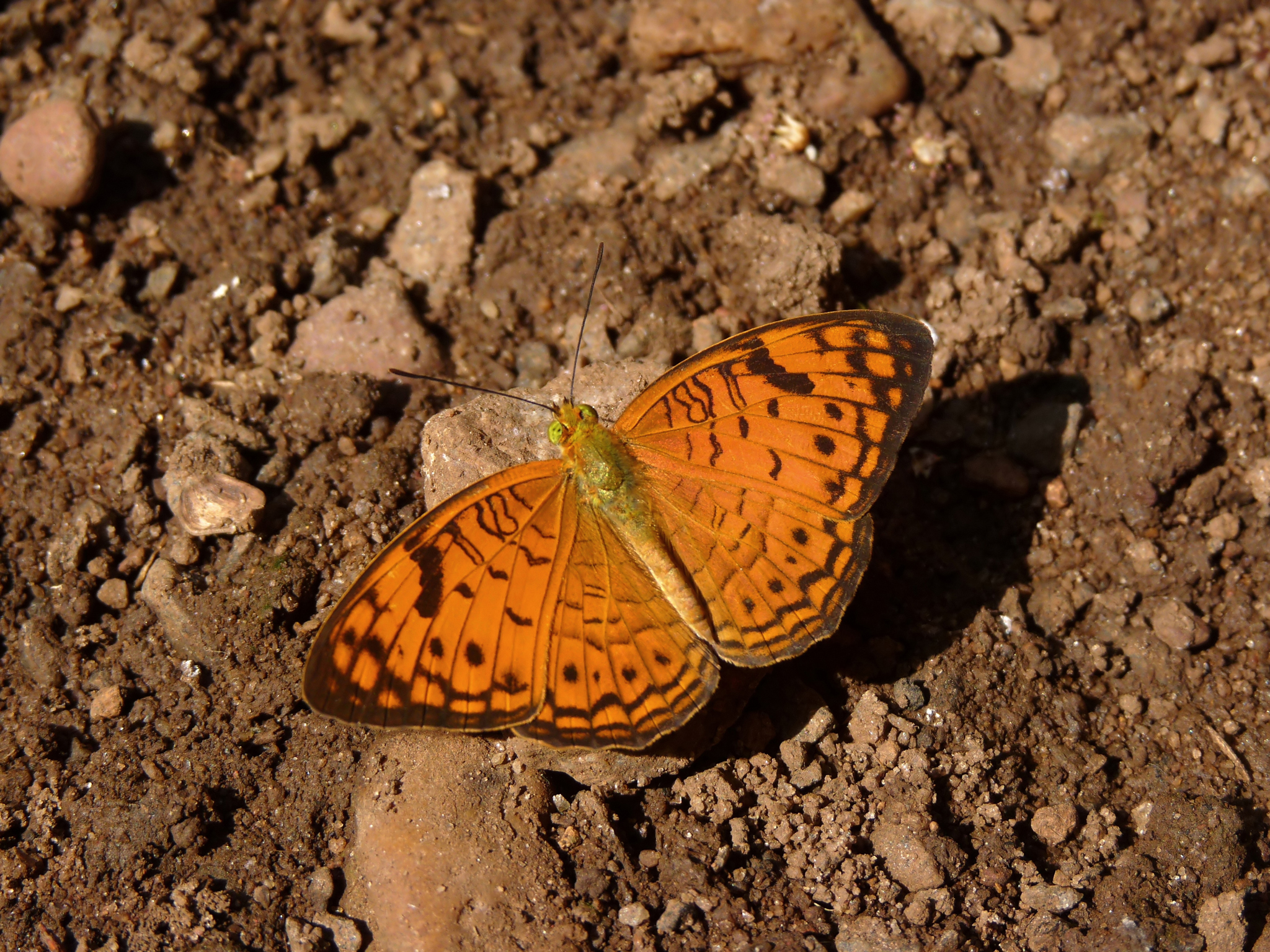
- Upperside
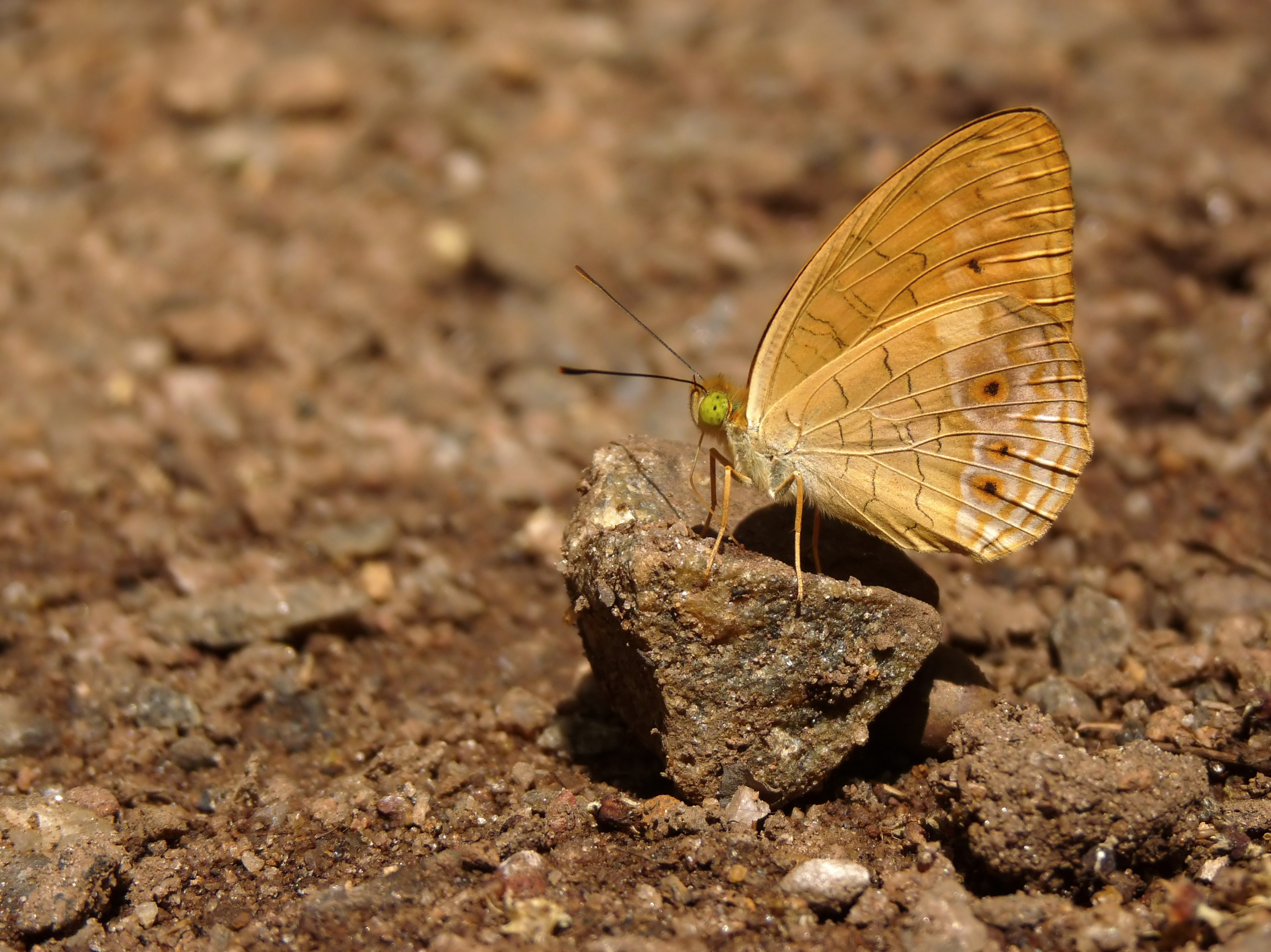
- Underside

Scientific classification
- Domain: Eukaryota
- Kingdom: Animalia
- Phylum: Arthropoda
- Class: Insecta
- Order: Lepidoptera
- Family: Nymphalidae
- Genus: Phalanta
- Species: P. alcippe

Binomial name
- Phalanta alcippe (Stoll, [1782])

Synonyms
- Papilio alcippe Stoll, [1782]; Phalanta alcesta Corbet, 1941; Phalanta aurica Eliot, 1978; Phalanta tiomana Corbet, 1937

= Phalanta alcippe =

Small leopard

Species of butterfly

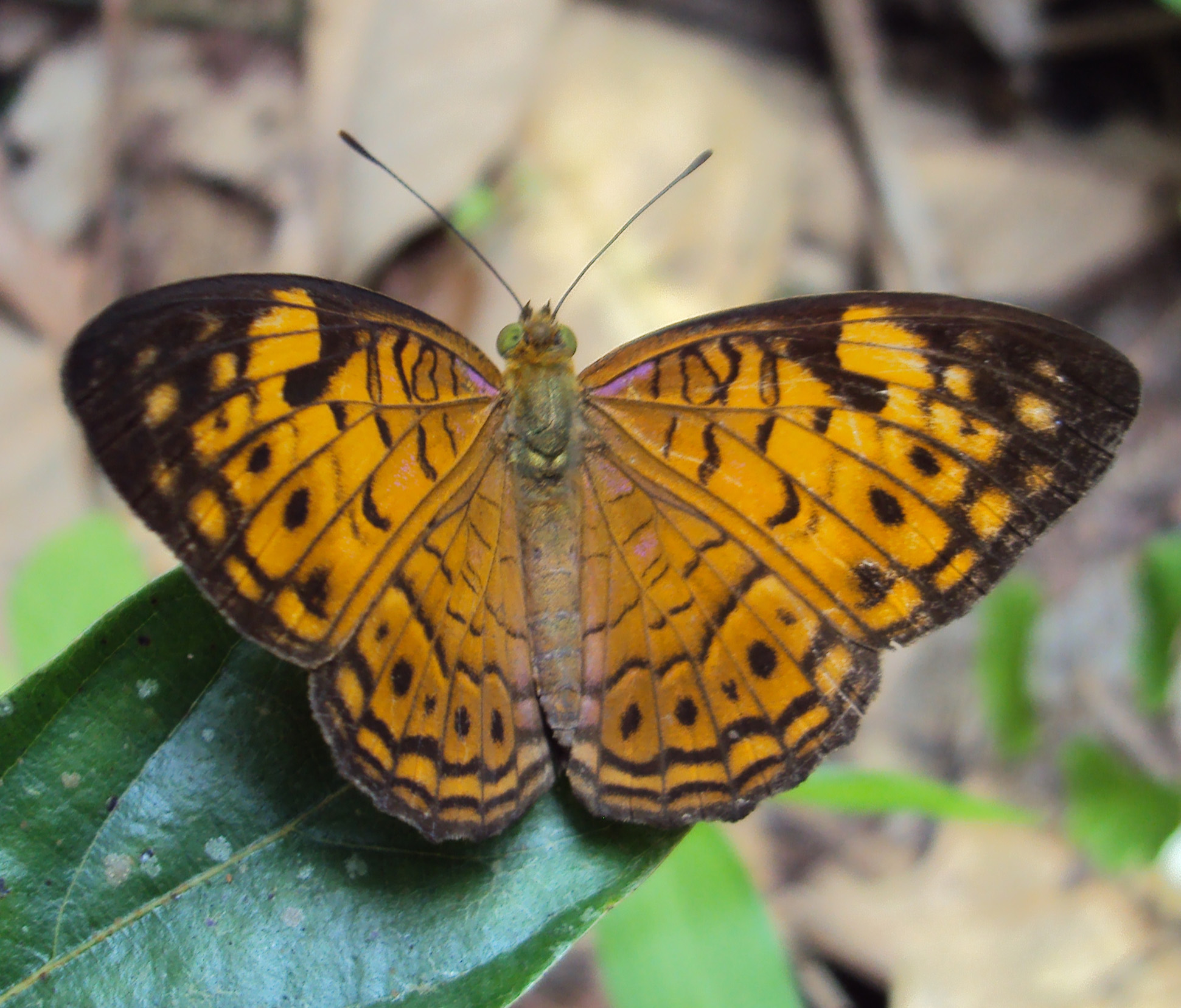
At Aralam Wildlife Sanctuary in Kerala, India

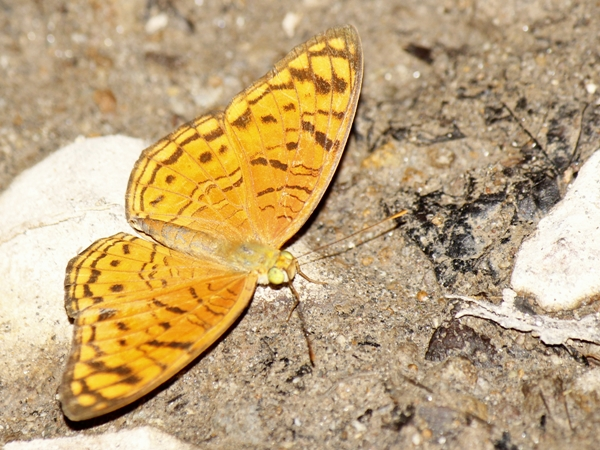
P. a. celebensis Wallace, in North Sulawesi

Phalanta alcippe, the small leopard, is a butterfly of the nymphalid or brush-footed butterfly family found in Asia.

== Description ==
Wet-season form: Male and female. Upperside bright ochreous. Forewing with two pairs of slender black wavy bars across the cell and a similar pair at end of cell; a black broad inner-discal irregular streak extending obliquely outward beyond the cell from the costa to upper median, followed below the cell by four short narrow streaks, the two upper placed between the medians, and the two lower in the sub-median interspace, with an outer medial streak also beyond the latter; beyond is a medial discal row of black spots, the two upper of which are either lunate and confluent, or separate, the lower four rounded, the lowest being more or less diffused; between the inner-discal costal streak and the latter row of spots is a short black sinuous streak decreasing from the costa to near upper median; a submarginal sinuous line and the outer border black, enclosing a row of ochreous lunulas, of which latter the three upper are small and obsolescent, the next more or less dentate, and the lower decreasingly linear. Hindwing with two slender blackish cell-bars, two at its end, an inner-discal transverse irregular sinuous line, a similar medial-discal line, followed by an outer-discal row of black rounded spots, a sub-marginal sinuous line, a narrower more even outer line, and black narrow outer border. Underside paler yellowish-ochreous; all the transverse markings ill-defined, except the lower discal black spots on forewing, the outer discal and marginal lines on both wings being slightly lunularly bordered by pale violaceous-grey. Dry-season form: Male and female. Upperside paler ochreous than in wet-season; the basal and discal markings all very slender and more or less obsolescent, the outer discal and marginal markings distinct. Underside paler, but similar to wet-season.

— Frederic Moore, Lepidoptera Indica. Vol. IV

== Subspecies ==
Listed alphabetically:

- P. a. alcesta Corbet, 1941 (Peninsular Malaya)
- P. a. alcippe (Ambon, Serang, Saparua)
- P. a. alcippina Fruhstorfer (Obi)
- P. a. andamana Fruhstorfer (Andaman Islands)
- P. a. alcippoides (Moore, [1900]) (India to southern Burma, Thailand, Sumatra, Borneo)
- P. a. arruanae (Felder, 1860) (Aru)
- P. a. asinia Fruhstorfer (Wetar, Timor)
- P. a. aurica Eliot, 1978 (Pulau Aur, Pulau Permanggil)
- P. a. bellona Howarth (Bellona Island)
- P. a. celebensis Wallace (Sulawesi)
- P. a. cervina (Butler, 1876) (north-western Irian)
- P. a. cervinides (Fruhstorfer, 1904) (Waigeu)
- P. a. ceylonica Mander (Sri Lanka)
- P. a. denosa Fruhstorfer (Bismarck Archipelago)
- P. a. drepana Fruhstorfer (Java)
- P. a. enganica Fruhstorfer (Enggano)
- P. a. ephyra Godman & Salvin (Bougainville, Shortlands)
- P. a. fraterna Moore (Nicobar Islands)
- P. a. floresiana Fruhstorfer (Flores, the Lesser Sunda Islands)
- P. a. kinitis Fruhstorfer (eastern New Guinea)
- P. a. omarion Fruhstorfer (Sula Islands)
- P. a. pallidior Staudinger (Palawan)
- P. a. quinta Fruhstorfer (Bachan, Halmahera)
- P. a. rennellensis Howarth (Rennel Island)
- P. a. semperi Moore (Philippines (Luzon to Cebu))
- P. a. tiomana Corbet, 1937 (Pulau Tioman)
- P. a. violetta Fruhstorfer (Philippines (Basilan))

== See also ==
- List of butterflies of India
- List of butterflies of India (Nymphalidae)
