= William Adams (Royal Navy officer, born 1716) =

Royal Navy officer

Captain William Adams
- Born: 1716
- Died: 1763 (aged 56–57)
- Military career
- Allegiance: Great Britain
- Branch: Royal Navy
- Rank: Captain
- Commands: HMS Northumberland
- Conflicts: Seven Years' War

William Adams (1716–1763) was an officer of the Royal Navy who served as captain of British flagship HMS Northumberland during the Seven Years' War.

Adams was born in England in 1716 and joined the Royal Navy in the 1740s. His first service was aboard the 44-gun HMS Gosport, followed by postings to the 14-gun sloop Swallow, HMS Deptford Prize and the 24-gun HMS Lyme. On 26 March 1750 he passed his lieutenant's examinations and was transferred to the 64-gun HMS Yarmouth. In 1757 he again transferred, this time to Vice-Admiral Edward Boscawen's flagship, the 100-gun HMS Royal George.
