= The Leopard (disambiguation) =

The Leopard is a novel by Giuseppe Tomasi di Lampedusa.

The Leopard may also refer to:

- The Leopard (1918 film), a Hungarian film featuring Bela Lugosi
- The Leopard (1963 film), an Italian film based on Lampedusa's novel
- Leopard a.k.a. Cold, a 2012 Irish film directed by actor/model Eoin Macken
- The Leopard (Nesbø novel), a crime novel by Jo Nesbø
- The Leopard (Reid novel), a 1958 novel by V. S. Reid
- The Leopard, a former pub in Stoke-on-Trent, England, see Burslem#Leopard Inn
- The Leopard (TV series), a 2025 Netflix miniseries adapting Lampedusa's novel

== See also ==
- Leopard (disambiguation)
