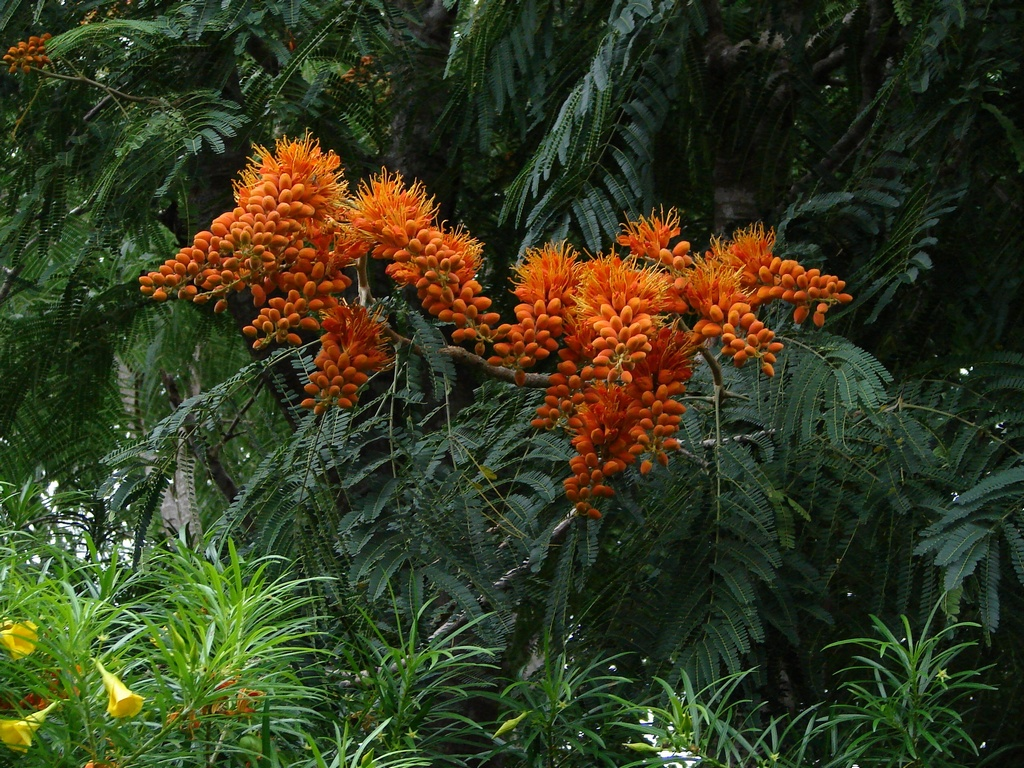

Conservation status
- Least Concern (IUCN 3.1)

Scientific classification
- Kingdom: Plantae
- Clade: Tracheophytes
- Clade: Angiosperms
- Clade: Eudicots
- Clade: Rosids
- Order: Fabales
- Family: Fabaceae
- Subfamily: Caesalpinioideae
- Genus: Colvillea; Bojer ex Hook. (1834)
- Species: C. racemosa

Binomial name
- Colvillea racemosa Bojer (1834)

= Colvillea =

Genus of legume

Colvillea is a monotypic genus of legume in the family Fabaceae. Its only species is Colvillea racemosa. The genus is named for Sir Charles Colville, an ex Governor of Mauritius.

Colvillea racemosa is known by the common name Colville's glory. The tree is particularly known for its bright orange flowers that grow in large cone or cylinder shaped clusters. After flowering, the tree produces long, flat, woody seed pods. The tree has small deep green leaves, superficially similar to Delonix regia.

The tree is native to northern and western Madagascar, although it is now widely grown as an ornamental plant in Australia and North America. In its native range, the tree primarily grows in dry lowland forest and savannah areas.

The species is listed as "Least Concern" on the IUCN red list.

== Gallery ==
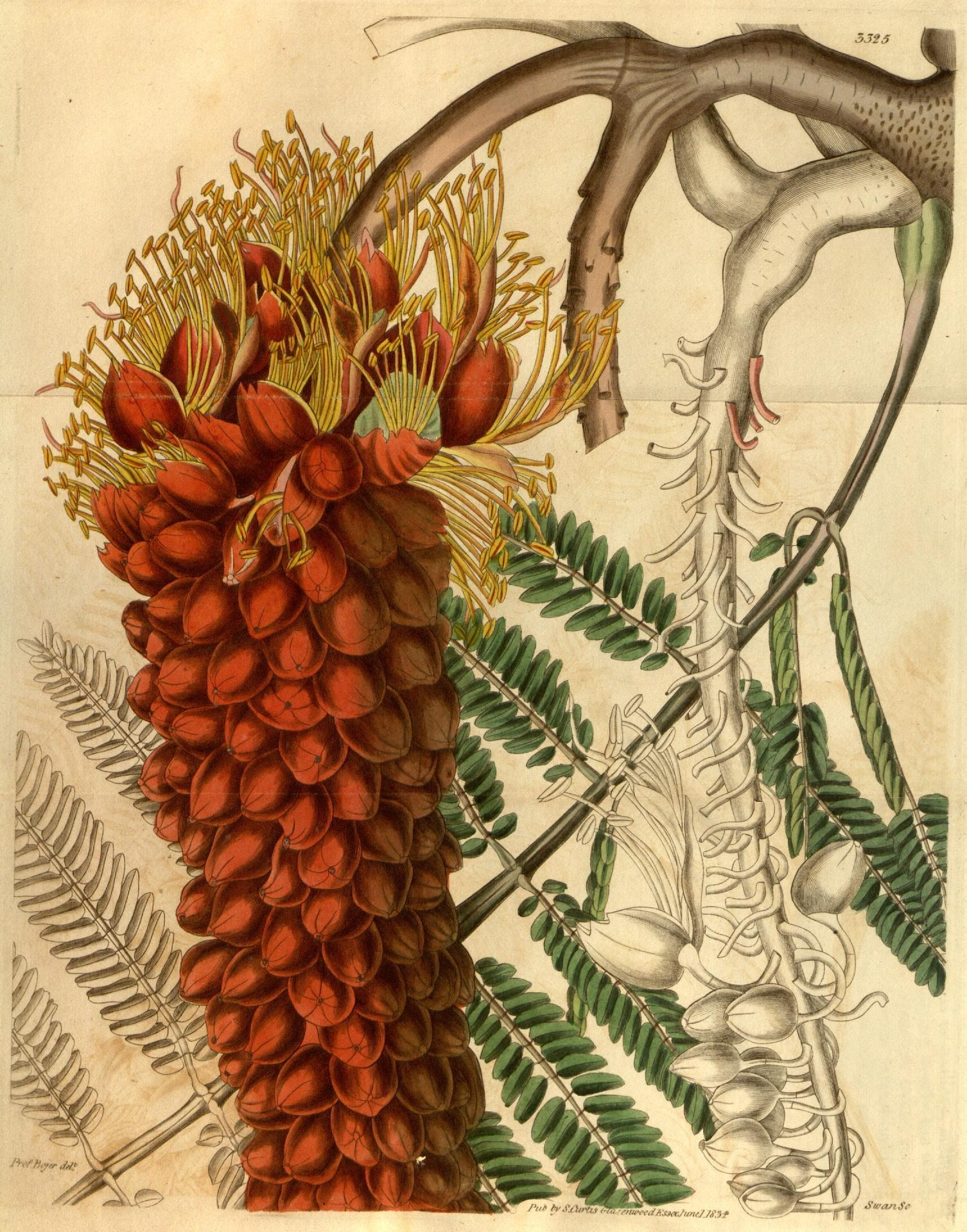
Illustration showing plant details

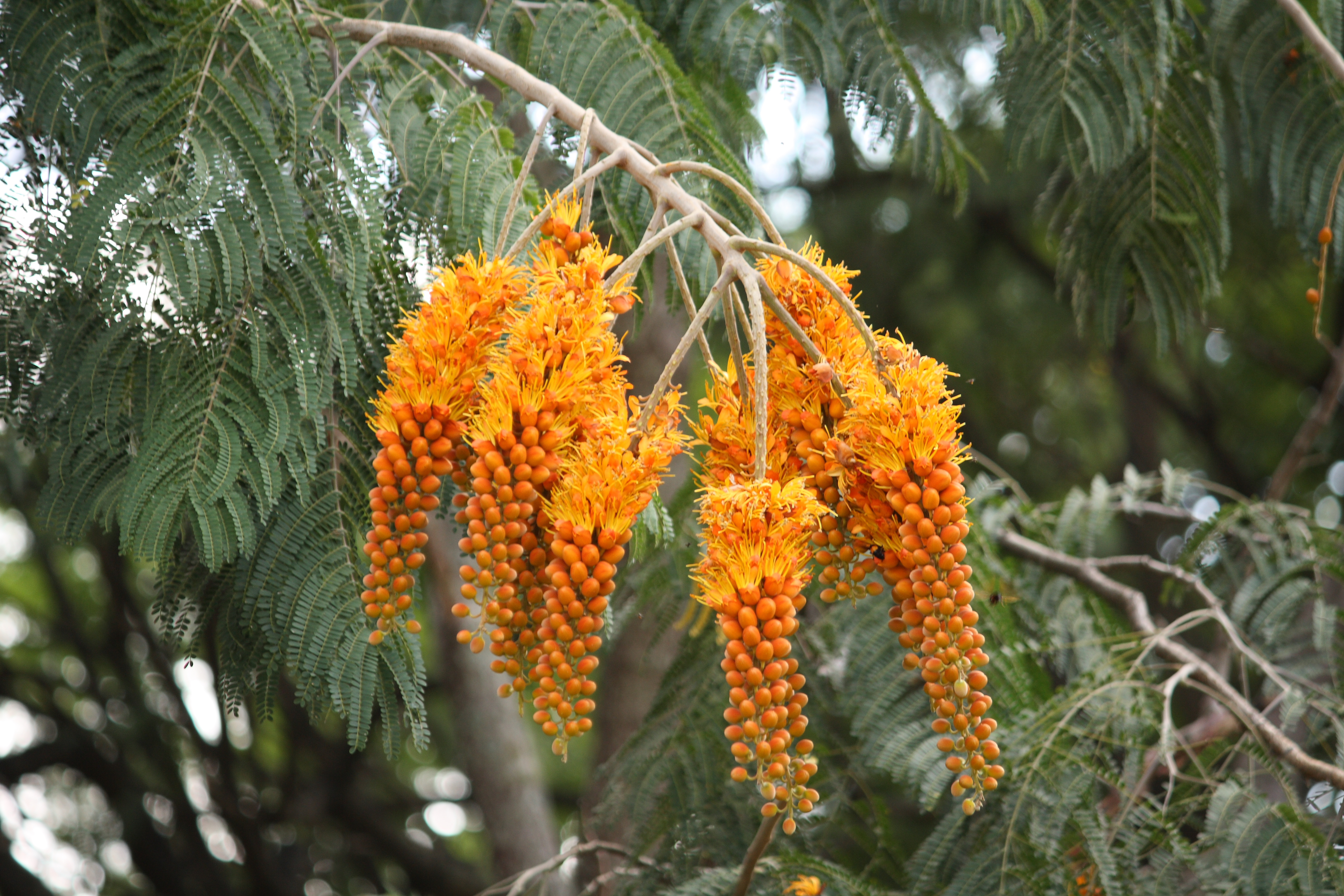
Flowers

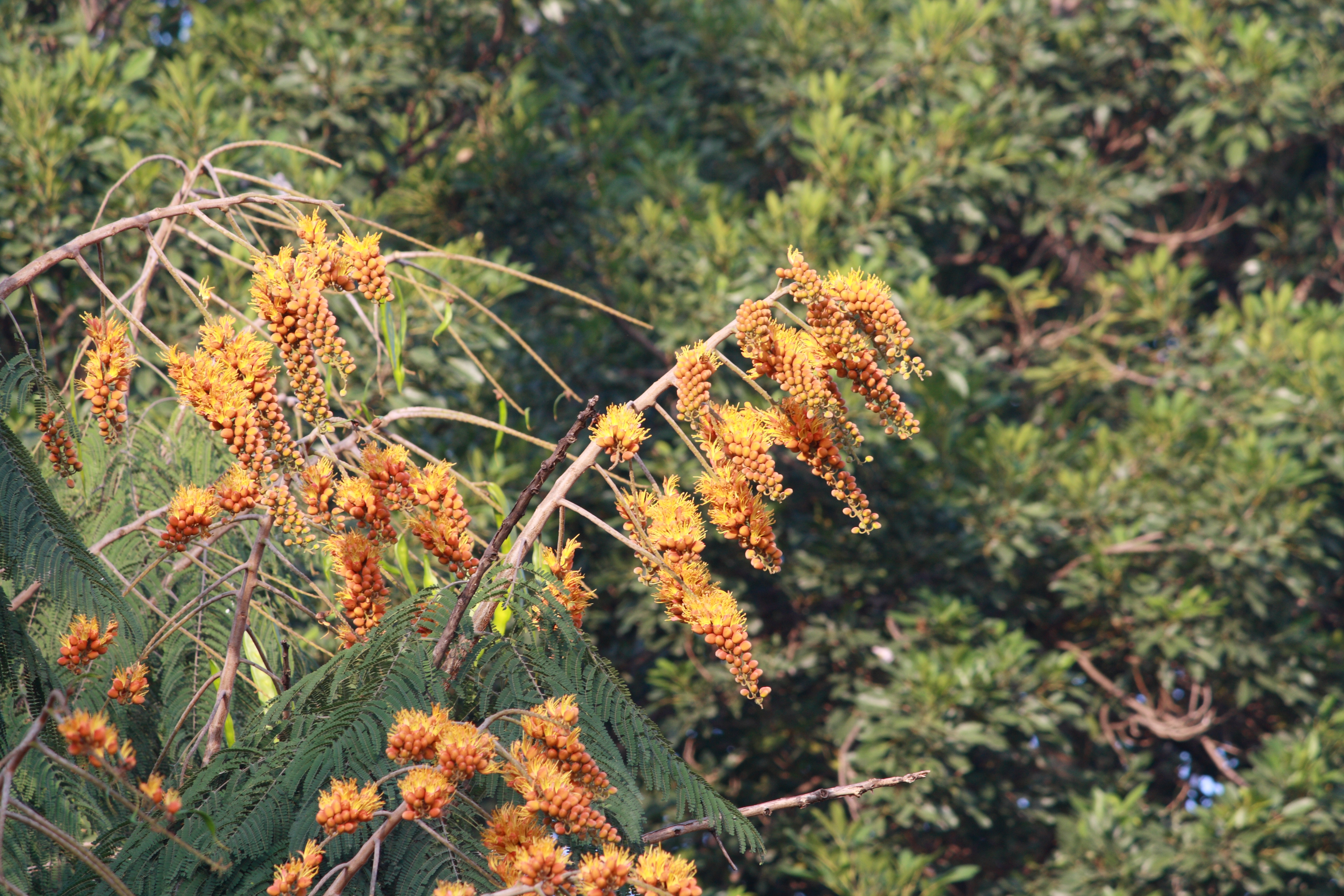
Flowers
