= Philip Durell =

Royal Navy officer

Vice-Admiral Philip Durell
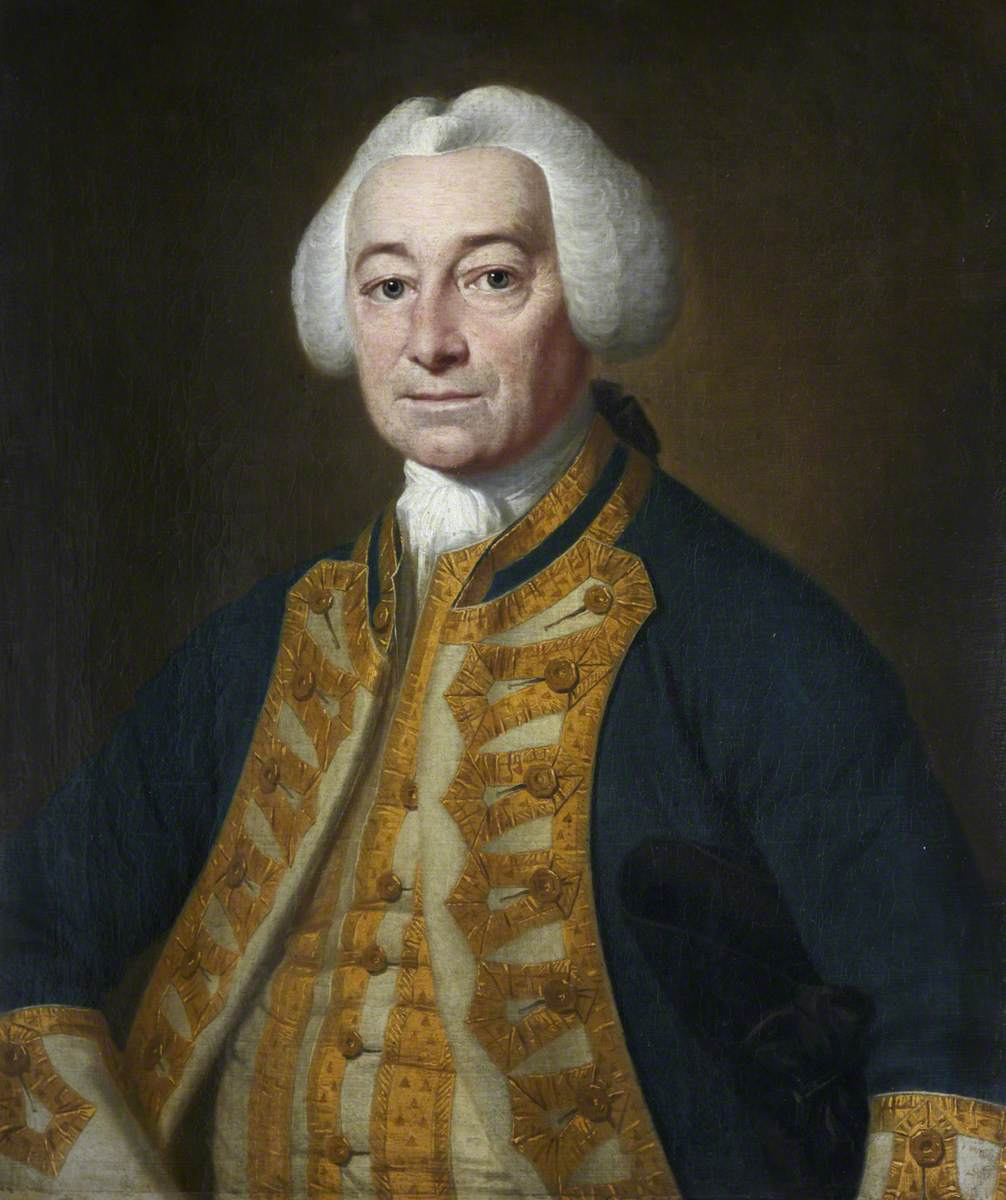
- Portrait attributed to Johan Zoffany
- Born: 1707; St Helier, Jersey
- Died: 26 August 1766 (aged 58–59); Halifax, Nova Scotia
- Military career
- Allegiance: Great Britain
- Branch: Royal Navy
- Rank: Vice-admiral
- Commands: HMS Eltham; HMS Gloucester; HMS Terrible; HMS Trident; Plymouth Command
- Conflicts: War of the Austrian Succession; Seven Years' War

Vice-Admiral Philip Durell (1707 – 26 August 1766) was a Royal Navy officer who went on to be Port Admiral at Plymouth.

== Naval career ==
Durell joined the Royal Navy as an ordinary seaman in 1721. In 1742 he was appointed post captain on HMS Eltham and sailed to the West Indies. In 1745 he took part in the successful Siege of Louisbourg during the War of the Austrian Succession. He was appointed captain of HMS Gloucester and took part in the defeat of the French Navy at Cape Ortegal off Spain in 1747. As captain of HMS Terrible from March 1755, he joined Rear-Admiral Francis Holburne's squadron supporting Vice-admiral Edward Boscawen in North America off Louisbourg later that year.

Becoming captain of HMS Trident he was part of Vice-admiral John Byng's fleet which engaged the French at the Battle of Minorca. The admiral's flagship nearly rear-ended Trident when Durell ordered the top mainsails aback in an attempt to cover HMS Intrepid which was, at that time, severely damaged. According to Dudley Pope, it was Durell who disobeyed the fighting instructions to keep to the battle line. Promoted to commodore in January 1758, he took part in the Siege of Louisbourg in June and July 1758 and subsequent capture of the Fortress of Louisbourg in July 1758. Then in September 1759 he took part in the capture of Quebec.

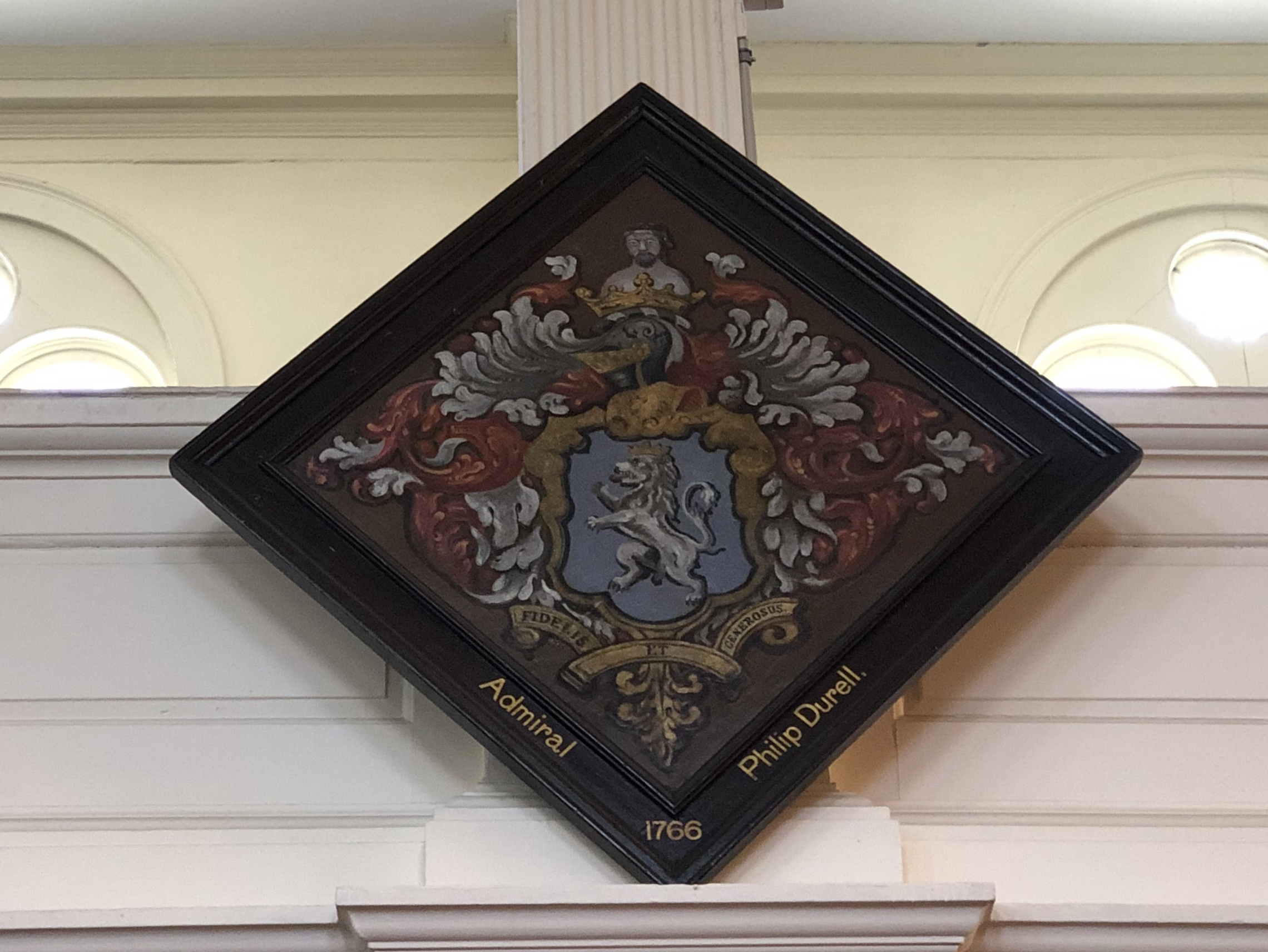
Philip Durell, Hatchment, St. Paul's Church (Halifax, Nova Scotia)

He became Port Admiral at Plymouth in June 1761. In 1766 he was named Commander-in-Chief of the North American Station but died within days of his arrival in North America.

He is buried in St Paul's Church in Halifax.

Military offices
Preceded by Unknown	Commander-in-Chief, Plymouth; 1761–1763	Succeeded by Lord Colville
