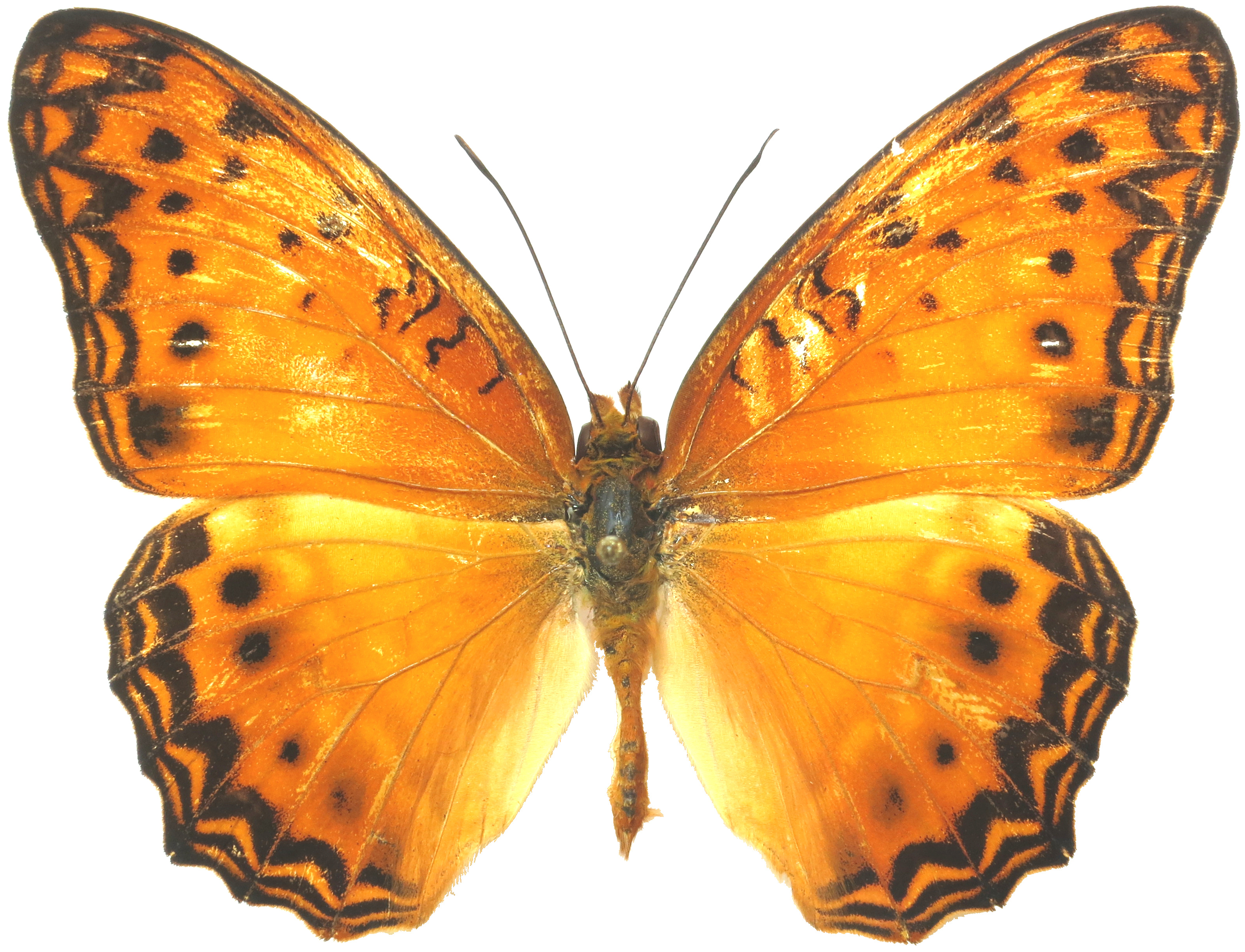
- Phalanta eurytis

Scientific classification
- Kingdom: Animalia
- Phylum: Arthropoda
- Clade: Pancrustacea
- Class: Insecta
- Order: Lepidoptera
- Family: Nymphalidae
- Genus: Phalanta
- Species: P. eurytis

Binomial name
- Phalanta eurytis (Doubleday, [1847])

Synonyms
- Atella eurytis Doubleday, [1847]; Albericia gomensis Dufrane, 1945; Atella columbina microps Rothschild & Jordan, 1903

= Phalanta eurytis =

Forest leopard

Species of butterfly

Phalanta eurytis, the forest leopard, forest leopard fritillary, or African leopard fritillary, is a butterfly of the family Nymphalidae. It is found in tropical Africa, Ethiopia, and Sudan.

The wingspan is 40–45 mm for males and 43–48 mm for females. Adults are on wing year round with a peak from January to June. It is similar to Phalanta phalantha in appearance but the marginal line of the forewing is unbroken. The male is a deeper orange color and the female is a dull pale orange.

The larvae feed on Dovyalis rhamnoides, Dovyalis caffra, Populus, Trimeria, Maytenus, Salix, Homalium, Ixora, and Theobroma cacao.

== Subspecies ==
- Phalanta eurytis eurytis (tropical Africa)
- Phalanta eurytis microps (Rothschild & Jordan, 1903) (Sudan, Ethiopia, Uganda, Kenya)

Torben Larsen developed a species numbering system for his 2005 publication Butterflies of West Africa. The nominate subspecies is #1201. The 'Larsen' numbers have since been used with permission in A Sharp Eye on Butterflies of Ghana.

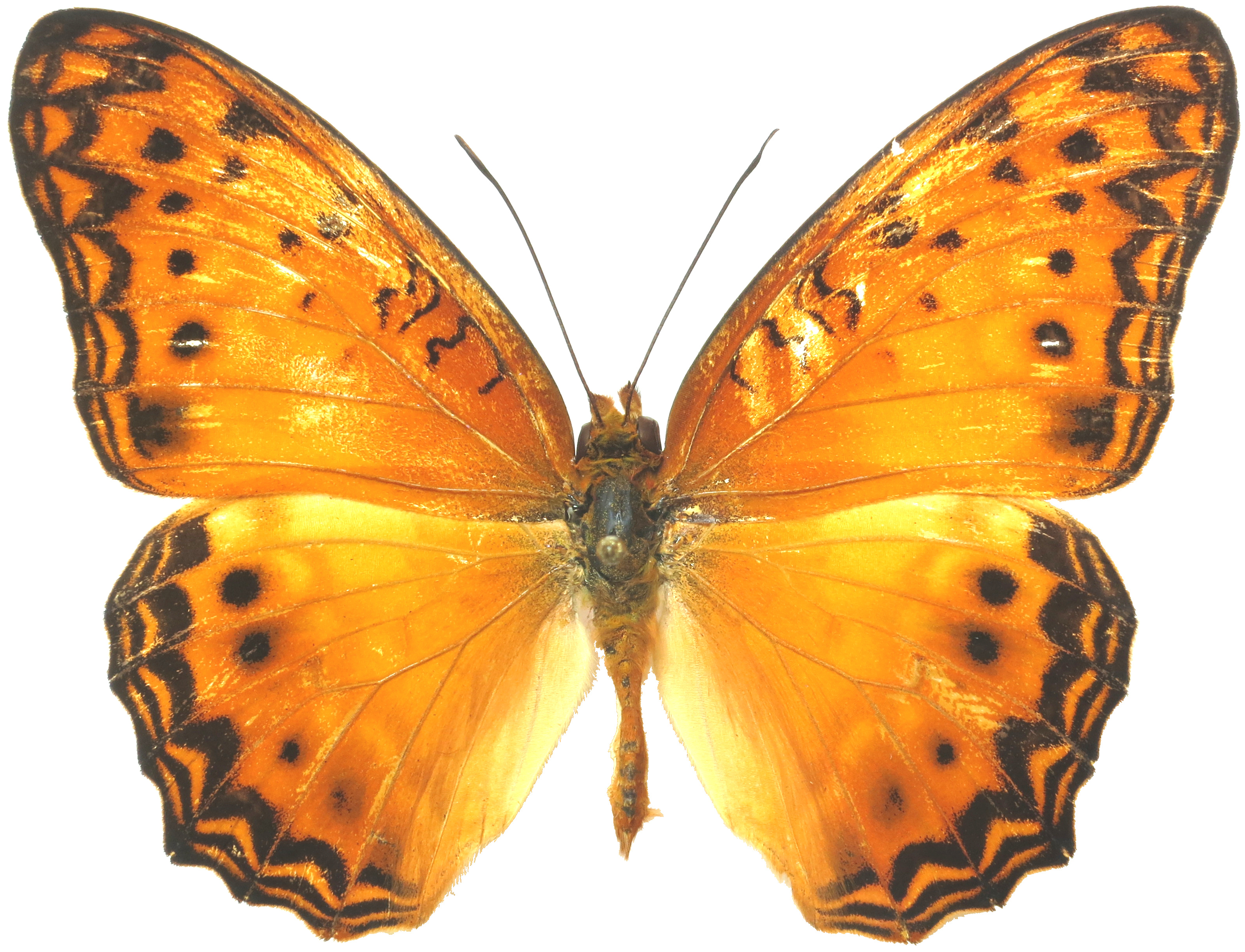
P. e. eurytis, dorsal view Cameroon

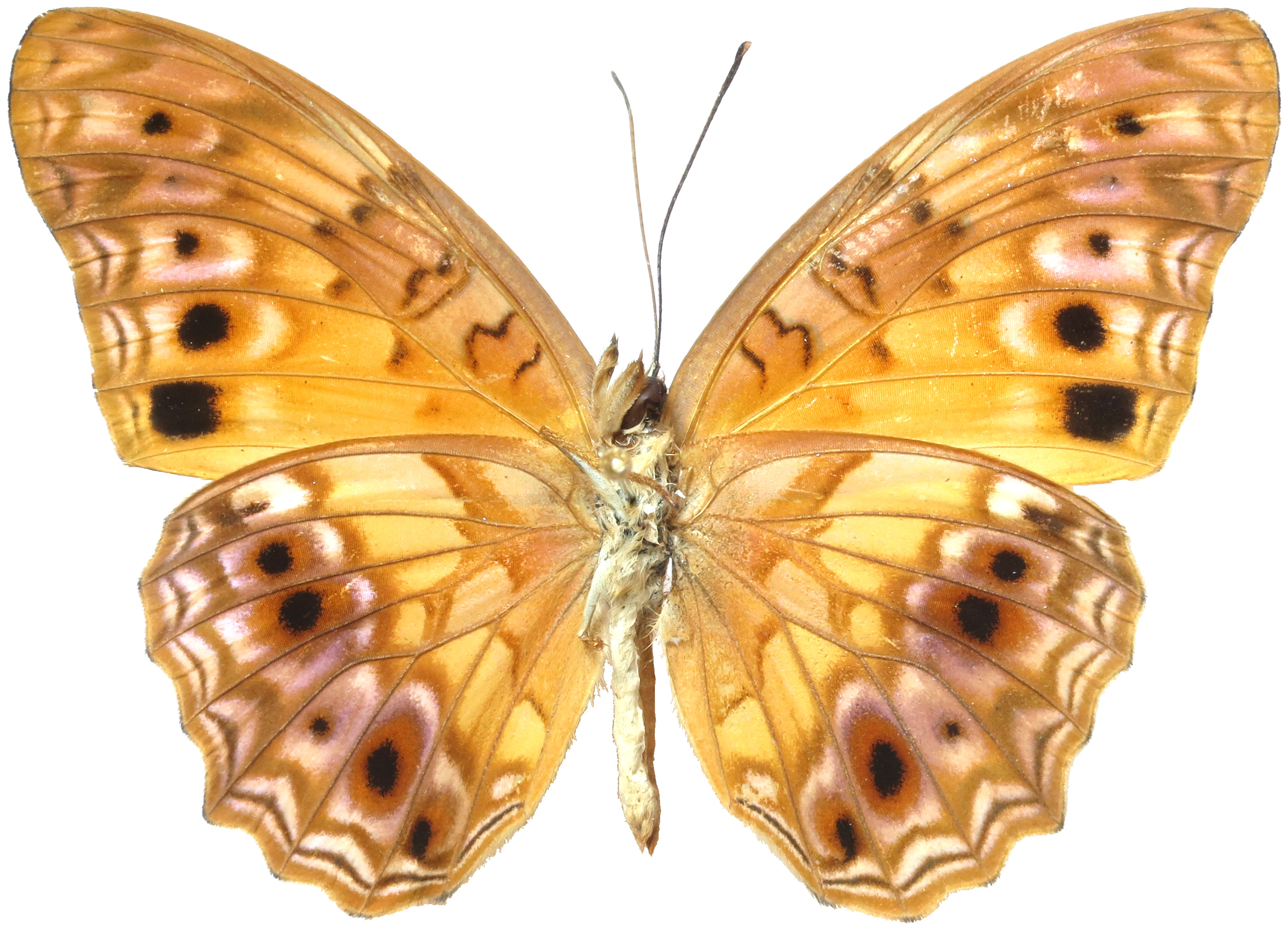
P. e. eurytis, ventral view Cameroon
