= Charles Colville, 5th Viscount Colville of Culross =

Scottish peer, politician, TV producer (born 1959)

The Right Honourable The Viscount Colville of Culross
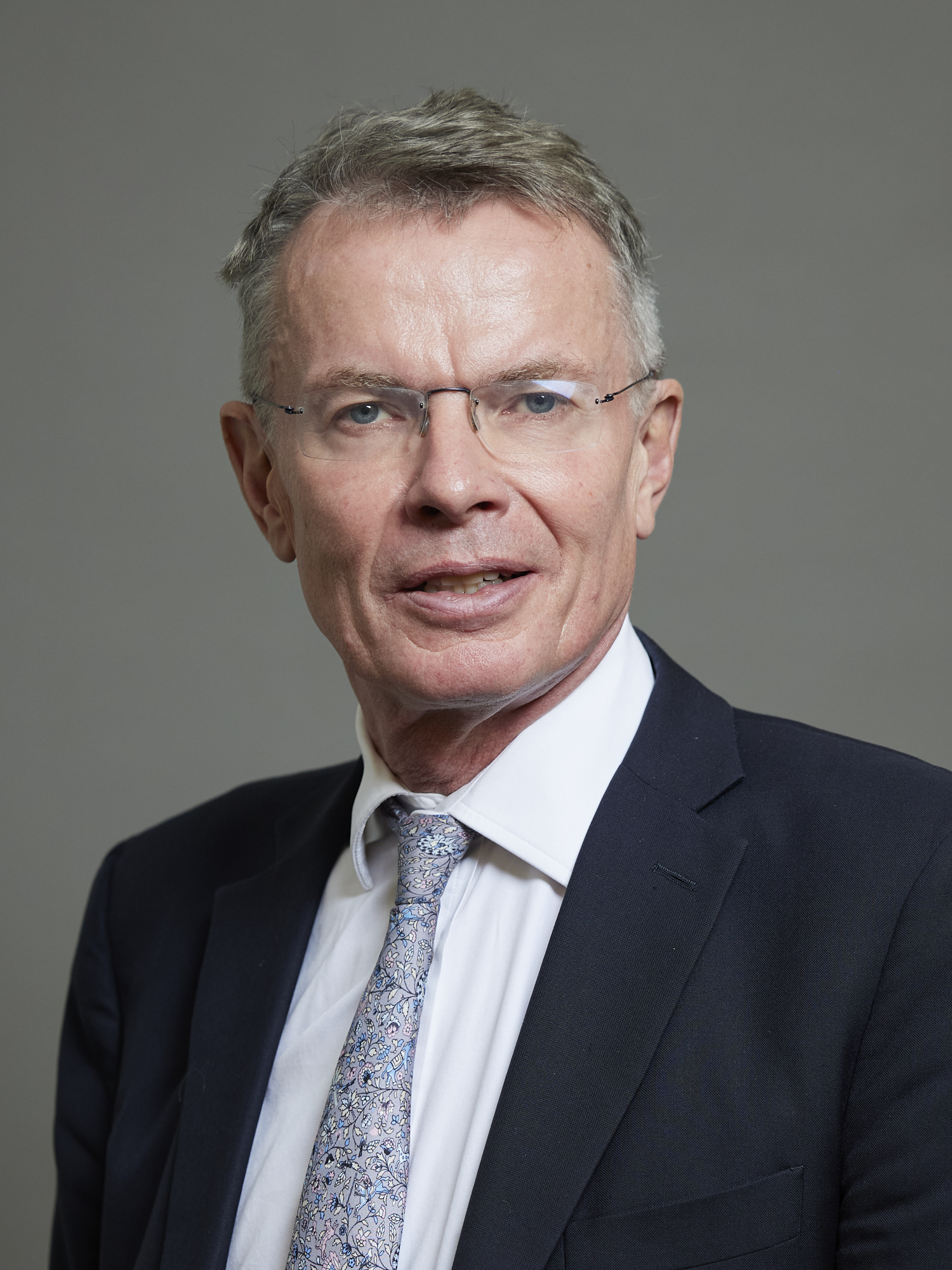
- Official portrait, 2023

Member of the House of Lords Lord Temporal
- Incumbent
- Life peerage 8 June 2026
- Elected Hereditary Peer; 25 July 2011 – 29 April 2026
- By-election: 2011
- Preceded by: The 4th Baron Ampthill
- Succeeded by: Seat abolished

Personal details
- Born: 5 September 1959 (age 67)
- Party: None (crossbencher)
- Education: Rugby School; St Chad's College
- Other titles: 5th Baron Colville of Culross; 14th Lord Colville of Culross

Charles Mark Townshend Colville, 5th Viscount Colville of Culross, Baron Colville of Waveney (born 5 September 1959), is a Scottish television producer, director and hereditary peer.

In May 2026, it was announced he was to be given one of 26 new life peerages, returning him to the House of Lords after the coming into force of the House of Lords (Hereditary Peers) Act 2026.

== Early life and education ==
Colville was born in 1959, the eldest son of Mark Colville, 4th Viscount Colville of Culross, and his first wife Mary Elizabeth Webb-Bowen. He was styled Master of Colville between 1959 and 2010. He was educated at Rugby School and at St Chad's College, Durham.

== Career ==
Colville worked as a newspaper reporter for the Ludlow Advertiser and the Berrow's Worcester Journal in the 1980s.

He succeeded to the viscountcy upon his father's death in 2010, and in July 2011 was elected to the House of Lords, where he sat as a crossbencher.

Colville used his maiden speech in the House of Lords to outline the downsides of unpaid internships in the media industry.

He is the Chief of Clan Colville.

== Personal life ==
Colville is unmarried. The heir presumptive to the viscountcy is his brother, the Hon. Richmond James Innys Colville.

Peerage of the United Kingdom
Preceded by Mark Colville	Viscount Colville of Culross; 2010–present	Incumbent; Heir presumptive: Hon. Richmond Colville
Preceded by Mark Colville	Baron Colville of Culross; 2010–present	Incumbent; Heir presumptive: Hon. Richmond Colville
Peerage of Scotland
Preceded by Mark Colville	Lord Colville of Culross; 2010–present	Incumbent; Heir presumptive: Hon. Richmond Colville
Parliament of the United Kingdom
Preceded by The Lord Ampthill	Elected hereditary peer to the House of Lords under the House of Lords Act 1999; 2011–2026	Position abolished under the House of Lords (Hereditary Peers) Act 2026
