= Leopardi (crater) =

Crater on Mercury

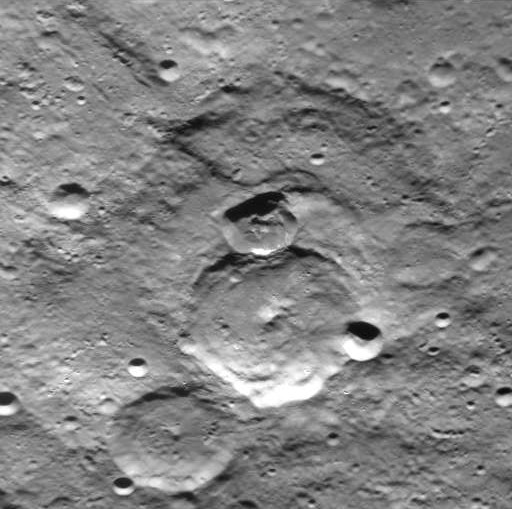
- MESSENGER NAC image of Leopardi
- Feature type: Impact crater
- Location: Bach quadrangle, Mercury
- Coordinates: 72.76°S 184.84°W
- Diameter: 71.45 km (44.40 mi)
- Eponym: Giacomo Leopardi

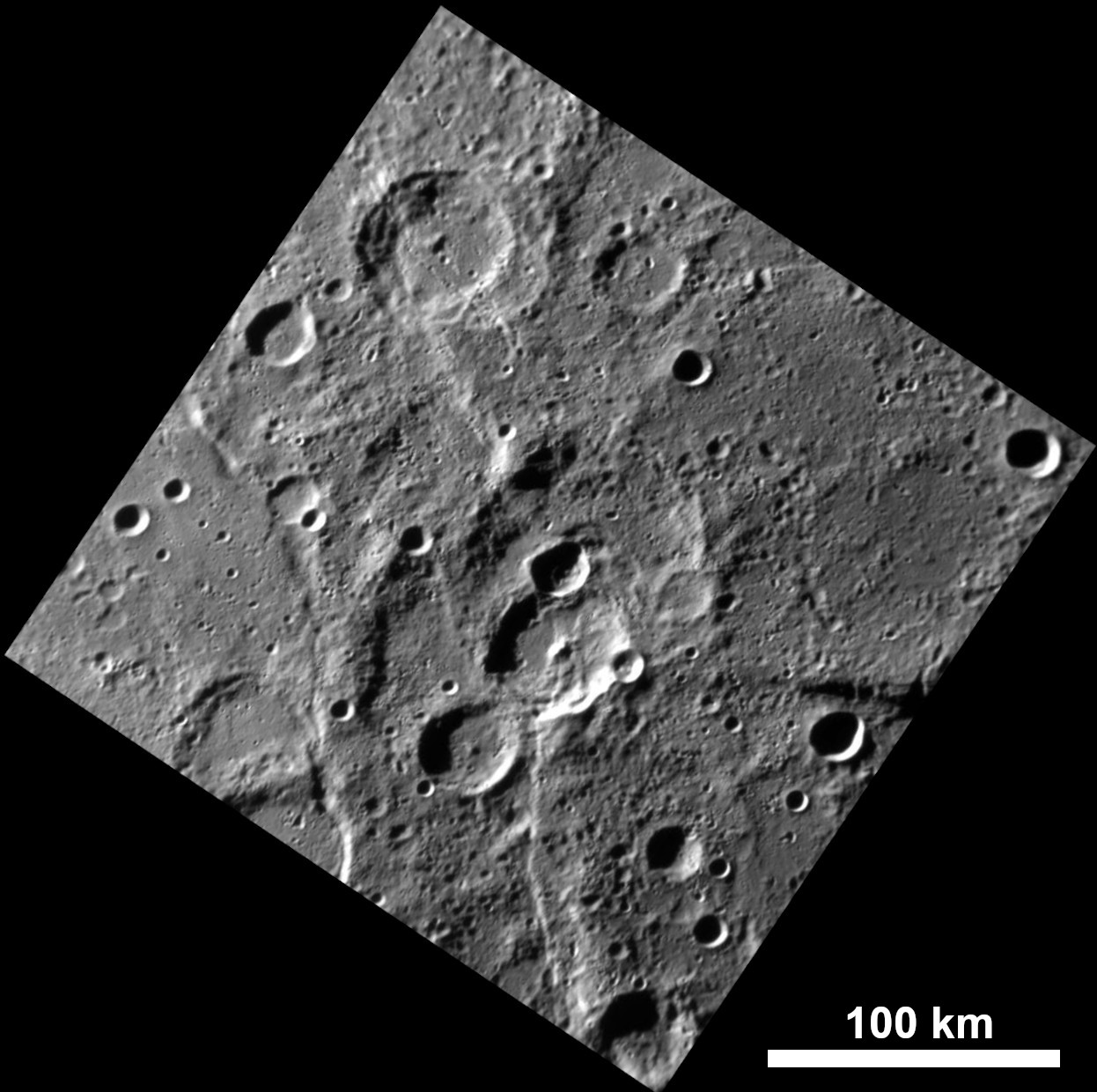
Part of Altair Rupes cutting across Leopardi at center

Leopardi is a crater on Mercury. Its name was adopted by the International Astronomical Union in 1976. Leopardi is named for the Italian writer Giacomo Leopardi, who lived from 1798 to 1837 from the crater.

An escarpment called Altair Rupes cuts across Leopardi crater. It extends to the east and to the northwest from the crater.
