= Mark Colville, 4th Viscount Colville of Culross =

Anglo-Irish peer and British politician and academic

The Right Honourable The Viscount Colville of Culross QC
- Colville's last speech in the Lords, two months before his death.

Member of the House of Lords
- Lord Temporal
- Hereditary peerage 26 July 1954 – 11 November 1999
- Preceded by: The 3rd Viscount Colville of Culross
- Succeeded by: Seat abolished
- Elected Hereditary Peer; 11 November 1999 – 8 April 2010
- Election: 1999
- Preceded by: Seat established
- Succeeded by: The 9th Earl of Clancarty

Minister of State for Home Affairs
- In office 21 April 1972 – 4 March 1974
- Monarch: Elizabeth II
- Prime Minister: Edward Heath
- Preceded by: The Lord Windlesham
- Succeeded by: The Lord Harris of Greenwich

Personal details
- Born: 19 July 1933
- Died: 8 April 2010 (aged 76)
- Party: Crossbench
- Education: New College, Oxford

John Mark Alexander Colville, 4th Viscount Colville of Culross (19 July 1933 – 8 April 2010), was a British judge and politician. He was one of the 92 hereditary peers elected to remain in the House of Lords after the House of Lords Act 1999.

== Early life and education ==
Colville was born in 1933, the son of Charles Colville, 3rd Viscount Colville of Culross, and his wife Kathleen Myrtle Gale. He succeeded to his father's viscountcy in 1945 at the age of twelve.

He was educated at Rugby School and New College, Oxford, where he graduated with a Bachelor of Arts in law in 1957, and with a Master of Arts in 1963.

== Career ==
Colville served in the Grenadier Guards, reaching the rank of Lieutenant. Called to the Bar at Lincoln's Inn in 1960, he became a Queen's Counsel in 1978 and a Bencher in 1986.

Between 1980 and 1983, he was the representative of the United Kingdom to the United Nations Commission on Human Rights. Between 1983 and 1987, Colville was the United Nations special rapporteur on the situation of human rights in Guatemala. He also served in the British government as chair of the Mental Health Act Commission. He was chairman of the Parole Board for England and Wales from 1988 to 1992, Recorder from 1990 to 1993, and Judge of the South Eastern Circuit from 1993 to 1999. From 1996 to 2000, he was a member of the United Nations Human Rights Committee. From 2001 he served as Assistant Surveillance Commissioner.

== Marriages and children ==
Colville was married twice. He was married firstly to Mary Elizabeth Webb-Bowen on 4 October 1958. They had four sons:

- Charles Mark Townshend Colville, 5th Viscount Colville of Culross (born 5 September 1959)
- Hon. Richmond James Innys Colville (born 9 June 1961)
- Hon. Alexander Fergus Gale Colville (born 9 July 1964)
- Hon. Rupert George Streatfeild Colville (born 17 May 1966)

Following a divorce in 1973 Colville was married secondly to Margaret Birgitta Davidson, Viscountess Davidson (née Norton), former wife of Andrew Davidson, 2nd Viscount Davidson, in 1974. They had one son:

- Hon. Edmund Carleton Colville (born 14 July 1978)

== Death ==
Lord Colville died at the age of 76 in 2010. His funeral was held at St Nicholas' Church, West Lexham. He was succeeded in the viscountcy by his eldest son, Charles.

== Notes ==
Peerage of the United Kingdom
Preceded by Charles Colville	Viscount Colville of Culross; 1945–2010; Member of the House of Lords (1954–1999)	Succeeded by Charles Colville
Preceded by Charles Colville	Baron Colville of Culross; 1945–2010	Succeeded by Charles Colville
Peerage of Scotland
Preceded by Charles Colville	Lord Colville of Culross; 1945–2010	Succeeded by Charles Colville
Parliament of the United Kingdom
New office created by the House of Lords Act 1999	Elected hereditary peer to the House of Lords under the House of Lords Act 1999; 1999–2010	Succeeded by The Earl of Clancarty
