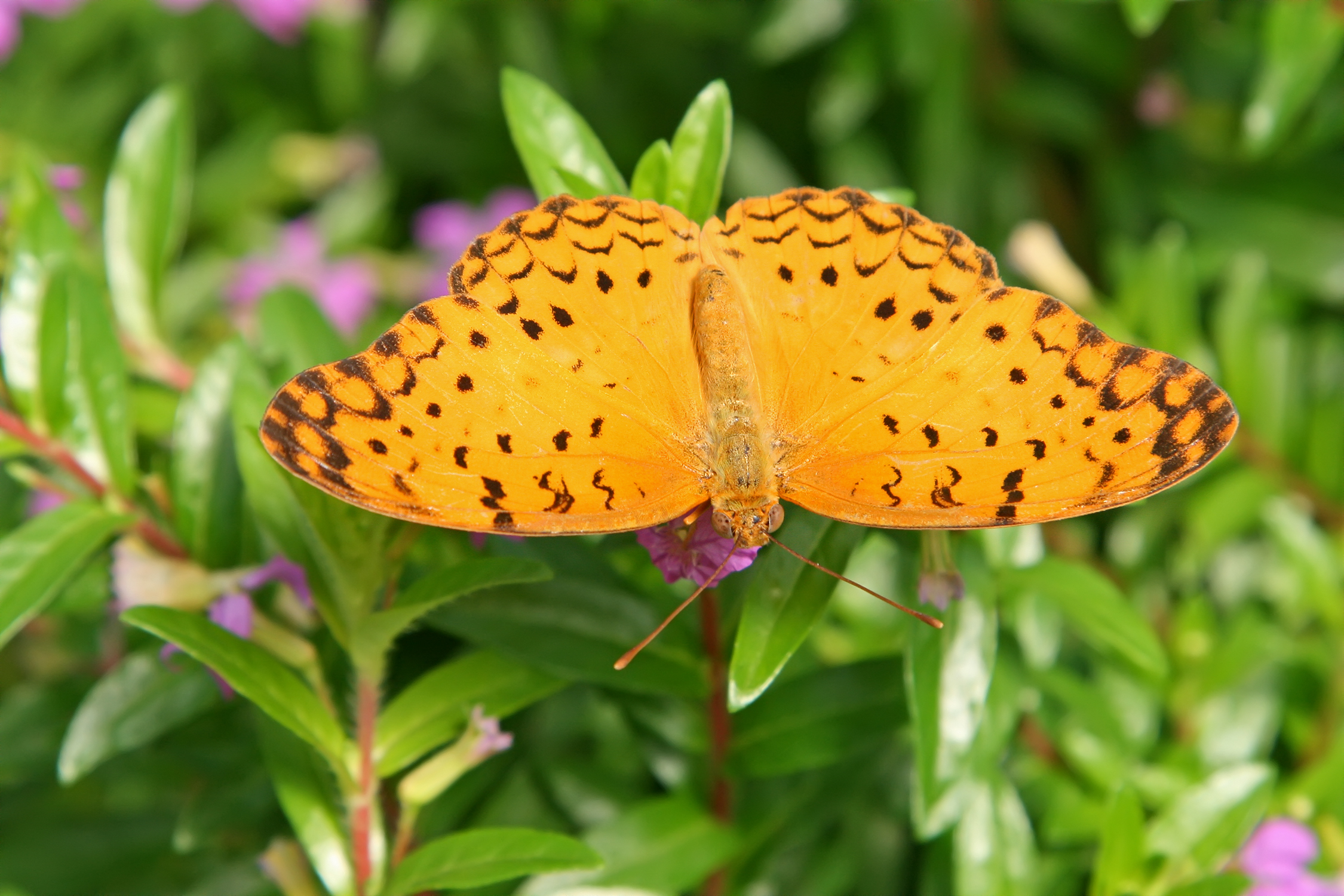
- Phalanta phalantha in Bangalore, India

Scientific classification
- Domain: Eukaryota
- Kingdom: Animalia
- Phylum: Arthropoda
- Class: Insecta
- Order: Lepidoptera
- Family: Nymphalidae
- Tribe: Vagrantini
- Genus: Phalanta; Horsfield, [1829]

Synonyms
- Atella Doubleday, 1847; Albericia Dufrane, 1945

= Phalanta =

Genus of brush-footed butterflies

Phalanta is a genus of butterflies, called leopards, in the family Nymphalidae. The genus ranges from Africa to northern Australia.

== Species ==
- Phalanta alcippe (Stoll, [1782]) – small leopard
- Phalanta eurytis (Doubleday, [1847]) – forest leopard, forest leopard fritillary, or African leopard fritillary
- Phalanta phalantha (Drury, [1773]) – common leopard or spotted rustic
- Phalanta madagascariensis (Mabille, 1887)
- Phalanta philiberti (de Joannis, 1893)
- Phalanta gomensis (Dufrane, 1945)
