= HMS Northumberland (1750) =

Ship of the line of the Royal Navy

- Northumberland

History

Great Britain
- Name: HMS Northumberland
- Ordered: 22 June 1744
- Builder: Thomas Fellowes (1744–1746); Benjamin Slade (1746–1750); Thomas Slade (1750)
- Laid down: 14 August 1744
- Launched: 1 December 1750
- Commissioned: January 1753
- Renamed: HMS Leviathan, 13 September 1777
- Fate: Foundered, 27 February 1780
- Notes: Storeship from 1777

General characteristics
- Class & type: 1745 Establishment 70-gun third rate ship of the line
- Tons burthen: 1414 56/94(bm)
- Length: 160 ft (48.8 m) (gundeck); 160 ft (48.8 m) (keel)
- Beam: 45 ft (13.7 m)
- Depth of hold: 19 ft 4 in (5.9 m)
- Sail plan: Full-rigged ship
- Complement: 520
- Armament: 70 guns: Gundeck: 26 × 32 pdrs; Upper gundeck: 28 × 18 pdrs; Quarterdeck: 12 × 9 pdrs; Forecastle: 4 × 9 pdrs

HMS Northumberland was a 70-gun third rate ship of the line of the Royal Navy, built at Plymouth Dockyard to the draught specified by the 1745 Establishment, and launched on 1 December 1750.

During the Seven Years' War, Northumberland was the flagship of Lord Alexander Collville from 1753 to 1762, and under the captaincy of William Adams until 1760 and Nathaniel Bateman from 1760 to 1762. Future explorer James Cook served as ship's master from 1759 to 1761.

Northumberland was later classified as a storeship and was renamed Leviathan on 13 September 1777. She foundered on 27 February 1780 whilst sailing from Jamaica to Britain. The location of the wreck off the coast of Kent is a protected site and the vessel is currently on the Heritage at Risk Register.
