= Alexander Colville, 7th Lord Colville of Culross =

Royal Navy admiral (1717–1770)

Rear-Admiral The Right Honourable The Lord Colville of Culross
- Born: 28 February 1717; Dundee, Scotland
- Died: 21 May 1770 (aged 53); Drumsheugh, Scotland
- Military career
- Allegiance: Kingdom of Great Britain
- Branch: Royal Navy
- Rank: Rear-Admiral
- Commands: HMS Leopard; HMS Northumberland; North American Station; Devonport Command
- Conflicts: War of Jenkins' Ear; Seven Years' War

Rear-Admiral Alexander Colville, 7th Lord Colville of Culross (also spelled Colvill; 28 February 1717 – 21 May 1770) served as the Commodore and Commander in Chief of His Majesty's Ships and Vessels in North America from 1757 to 1762.

Colville contributed to British success in the North American seas and the battles of the Seven Years' War of 1756–1763. He was a prolific writer of detailed letters to other military leaders, his family, the King, and others. These letters are historically important, and are extant on both sides of the Atlantic.

== Early career ==
Colville joined the Royal Navy as a volunteer in 1732. In 1739 he was present at the sieges of Portobelo in Panama and of Cartagena in Colombia during the War of Jenkins' Ear. In 1740 he was given command of HMS Leopard in which he captured or destroyed many enemy ships.

== Seven Years' War ==
=== Attack on Louisbourg ===
Colvill came to Canada during the summer of 1757 with the rank of Captain R.N., in command of the 70-gun HMS Northumberland, which formed part of Vice-Admiral Holburne's fleet ordered to attack Louisbourg. The attack was called off due to the strength of the French fleet, and because the British squadron had been caught and scattered by a September hurricane. On 14 November 1757, Colville assumed command at Halifax with the rank of Commodore as instructed by Holburne. He remained in Halifax over the winter flying his broad pendant in the Northumberland (Capt. Henry Martin, R.N.).

On 19 March 1758, Rear-Admiral Sir Charles Hardy arrived at Halifax from England and took over the squadron with instructions from Vice-Admiral Edward Boscawen to blockade Louisbourg. Colville reverted to captain and re-assumed command of the Northumberland in which he served under Boscawen at the successful Siege of Louisbourg. He returned to England with Boscawen, spent the winter there, and came out to Louisbourg again in the spring of 1759, arriving on 14 May still in command of the Northumberland.

=== Siege of Quebec ===
He served at the siege of Quebec as part of Rear-Admiral Philip Durell's force of great ships which patrolled the Gulf of St. Lawrence during the campaign. On 16 October 1759, Colville was appointed by Vice-Admiral Charles Saunders, to the position of Commander-in-Chief in North America with the rank of commodore. He spent the winter at Halifax, flying his broad pendant in the Northumberland, (Capt. W. Adams).

In April 1760, he led his squadron to Quebec to find that a small force under Captain Swanton on HMS Vanguard had relieved the British garrison which was under attack by 11,000 French troops commanded by General Lévis. Colville remained in St. Lawrence until early October when, observing that Vaudreuil surrendered Canada to General Amherst, he dispersed the ships and returned to Halifax, sailing from the Île d'Orléans on 13 October and arriving in Halifax 24 October. Next day, HMS Greyhound arrived with Admiralty instructions for Swanton to relieve Colville as commander-in-chief, with the rank of commodore. Swanton had been instructed by Colville to escort the transports to England as soon as the French prisoners were on board—a date estimated to be 20 October. The Greyhound was therefore sent back to the St. Lawrence to look for the Vanguard with instructions to return to England if the latter had sailed. Colville reported that he would carry on as Commander-in-Chief until relieved. Swanton was not found and Colville spent his third winter in command at Halifax, still a commodore and still in the Northumberland.

=== Burying the Hatchet Ceremony ===
He remained as commander-in-chief over the winter of 1761/62. On 25 June 1761, he participated in the "Burying the Hatchet ceremony" that was held at Governor Jonathan Belcher's garden on present-day Spring Garden, Halifax, in front of the Court House. The ceremony ended seventy years of warfare between the Mi'kmaq and the British.

=== Relief of St. John's, Newfoundland ===
He went to the relief of St. John's, Newfoundland, in August 1762. Finally he got back to England in the autumn of that year and was promoted Rear-Admiral of the White on 21 October 1762. In January 1763 he took over from Rear Admiral Philip Durell as Port Admiral at Plymouth.

=== Return to Halifax ===
After less than a year in the United Kingdom Colville was again appointed to the North American Station in June 1763. He sailed in HMS Romney on 31 August 1763 and arrived in Halifax on 13 October. He remained there for the next three years thus establishing a record for command of the station. Little of importance occurred during these years and the Admiral's dispatches report that his main concerns were smuggling and desertion.

== Successors ==
Lord Colville was succeeded by Vice-Admiral of the Blue, Philip Durell, but the latter died on 26 August 1766 just four days after his arrival at Halifax. However, this melancholy event did not delay Colville in his departure. He sailed for England on 5 September leaving instructions for Captain Joseph Deane of HMS Mermaid to take command until the arrival of a new Commander-in-Chief.

== Death of Colville ==
Colville apparently held no other command and received no further promotion. He died at Drumsheugh in Scotland on 21 May 1770, aged 53.

== Notes ==
Military offices
Preceded by Philip Durell	Commander-in-Chief, Plymouth; January–June 1763	Succeeded by Sir Thomas Pye
Peerage of Scotland
Preceded by John Colville	Lord Colville of Culross; 1741–1770	Succeeded by John Colville
