= HMS Leopard (1794) =

History

Great Britain
- Name: HMS Leopard
- Acquired: By purchase (Admiralty Order 3 February 1794)
- Fate: Sold 1808

General characteristics
- Type: Hoy
- Tons burthen: 65 (bm)
- Length: Overall: 66 ft 4 in (20.2 m); Keel: 57 ft 11 1/2 in (17.7 m)
- Beam: 14 ft 6 in (4.4 m)
- Depth of hold: 6 ft 3 1/2 in (1.9 m)
- Propulsion: Sails
- Sail plan: sloop
- Complement: 30
- Armament: 1 × 24-pounder gun + 3 × 32-pounder carronades

HMS Leopard was a 4-gun gun-vessel, formerly a Dutch hoy, purchased in February 1794. She was fitted out at Deptford between April and 13 May, and commissioned under Lieutenant Benjamin Maitland. She was paid off in January 1795. Lieutenant Benjamin Rose recommissioned her in June.

Although some records indicate that Leopard was broken up a Sheerness in April 1795, that appears to be in contradiction both with Lieutenant Ross's appointment to her, and other records that indicate that the Navy used her as a pitch boat from 1796 before selling her in 1808. The Principal Officers and Commissioners of His Majesty's Navy offered the "pitch boat Leopard" for sale on 6 October 1808.
