= Charles Colville =

British Army officer (1770–1843)

General The Honourable Sir Charles Colville GCB GCH
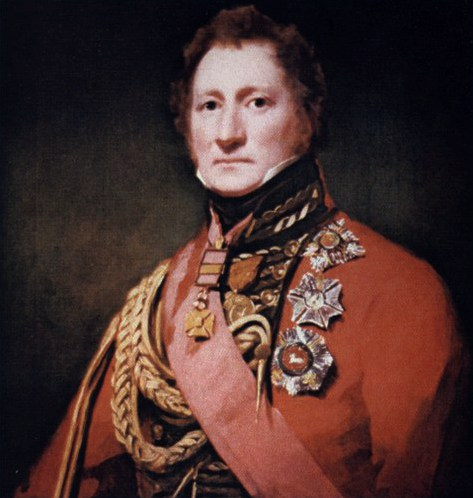
- Sir Charles Colville
- Born: 7 August 1770
- Died: 27 March 1843 (aged 72)
- Military career
- Allegiance: United Kingdom
- Branch: British Army
- Rank: General
- Commands: Bombay Army
- Awards: Knight Grand Cross of the Order of the Bath; Knight Grand Cross of the Royal Guelphic Order

General Sir Charles Colville GCB GCH (7 August 1770 – 27 March 1843) was a British Army officer who served during the Napoleonic Wars. He was an ensign in 1781. He served in the West Indies from 1791 to 1797 and while serving there was promoted to lieutenant-colonel (1796). He helped to suppress the Irish Rebellion of 1798. He was in Egypt in 1801 and fought at Martinique in 1809. He commanded brigade, and afterwards division, in the Peninsular War from 1810 until 1814. During the Waterloo Campaign of 1815 he commanded a division in Belgium and the same year was made a K.C.B. In 1819 he was promoted to lieutenant-general and served as commander-in-chief at Bombay from 1819 until 1825. He was governor of Mauritius from 1828 until 1834. He was promoted to general in 1837.

== Biography ==
Charles Colville was the third son of John Colville, 8th Lord Colville of Culross and Amelia Webber, in the peerage of Scotland, was born on 7 August 1770. In 1818 Colville married Jane Mure 27 May 1843), eldest daughter of William Mure of Caldwell. He had two sons, Charles John (23 Nov 1818 – 1 Jul 1903) and William James (9 Mar 1827 – 16 Oct 1903; in 1850 a lieutenant in the Rifle Brigade—the 95th), and two daughters, Catherine Dorothea (d. 26 Feb 1904) and Georgina Clementina (d. 18 Mar 1871). Upon the death of his elder brother, Admiral John Colville, 9th Lord Colville of Culross, in 1849 (without heirs), the title devolved to his first son, Charles, and the honors to all his children. His eldest son was, in 1850, a major in the artillery.

=== Military service ===
Colville entered the army as an ensign in the 28th regiment on 26 December 1781, but did not join until 1787, in which year he was promoted lieutenant. In May 1791 he was promoted captain into the 13th Somersetshire Light Infantry, with which he remained for nineteen years, until he became a major-general. He joined it in December 1791 in the West Indies, and remained with it until its return to England in 1797, seeing much service in the interval, especially in San Domingo, and being promoted major 1 September 1795 and to lieutenant-colonel 26 August 1796.

Colville commanded the 13th in the suppression of the Irish Rebellion of 1798, and in the expeditions to Ferrol and Egypt. In Egypt, his regiment formed part of Major-General John Cradock's brigade, and distinguished itself in the battles of Abukir, Mandora, and Canope, and in the subsequent investment of the French garrison at Alexandria. On leaving Egypt, Colville, who had there established his reputation as a good regimental officer, took his regiment to Gibraltar, where he remained until 1805, in which year he was promoted to colonel. After a short period in England he went with his regiment to Bermuda in 1808, and in 1809 he was made a brigadier-general and commanded the 2nd brigade of George Prevost's division in the capture of Martinique.

On 25 July 1810, Colville was promoted major-general and at once applied for a command in the Iberian Peninsula. In October 1810 he took over the command of the 1st brigade of the 3rd Division, which was under the command of Thomas Picton. He soon became not only Picton's trusted lieutenant, but one of Wellington's favourite brigadiers. He commanded his brigade in the pursuit after Massena, and in the Battle of Fuentes de Oñoro, shared the superintendence of the trenches with Major-General John Hamilton at the second siege of Badajoz. He also commanded the infantry in the affair at El Bodón on 25 September 1811, and the 4th division in the place of Major-General Cole in the successful siege of Ciudad Rodrigo. He shared the superintendence of the trenches in the third and last siege of Badajoz with Generals Bowes and Kempt (who replaced the wounded Picton), and commanded the 4th division in the storming of the Trinidad bastion, where he was shot through the left thigh and lost a finger of his right hand.

Colville returned to England to recuperate, and thus missed the battle of Salamanca, but returned to the Peninsula in October 1812 and commanded the 3rd division in winter quarters until superseded by the arrival of General Picton. He commanded his brigade only at the Battle of Vitoria, where he was slightly wounded, but was specially appointed by Lord Wellington to the temporary command of the 6th division from August to November 1813, when he reverted to the 3rd division, which he commanded at the battles of the Nivelle and the Nive. He was again superseded by the arrival of Sir Thomas Picton, but in February 1814 Lord Wellington appointed him permanently to the 5th division in the place, of Sir James Leith. With it he served under Sir John Hope in the siege of Bayonne, and it was Colville who superintended the final embarkation of the last English troops left in France.

Colville's services were well-rewarded; he received a cross with one clasp; he was made a K.C.B. in January and a G.C.B. in March, 1815; he was appointed colonel of the 94th regiment in April 1815. When the return of Napoleon from Elba made it necessary for a British Army to be sent to the continent, he was made a local lieutenant-general in the Netherlands at Wellington's special request, and took command of the 4th Division there. Colville's division was posted on the extreme right of the British division at Halle during the Battle of Waterloo. To compensate him for not being more actively engaged there, Wellington gave him the duty of storming Cambrai, the only French fortress which did not immediately surrender. He succeeded with the loss of only thirty men killed and wounded.

=== Post active-duty service ===
Colville did not again see active service. He was promoted lieutenant-general in 1819, and was commander-in-chief of the Bombay Army from 1819 to 1825. From 17 June 1828 to 3 February 1833, Colville was 3rd Governor of Mauritius when the population of 100,000 (two-thirds in slavery) were in semi revolt against the crown. In 1829 he described the mentalité esclavagiste (slave mentality) of the island's land owning inhabitants, who were extremely hostile to any reforms of slaves' working conditions. In 1830 he reported that there was "a great deal of bad feeling against His Majesty’s Government continues to prevail and shew itself here… there is an almost total cessation in the payment of taxes..." He was briefly Colonel of the 14th (Buckinghamshire) Regiment before being appointed colonel of the 5th (Northumberland Fusiliers) Regiment of Foot in March 1835.

Colville was promoted to general on 10 January 1837, and died on 27 March 1843 at Rosslyn House, Hampstead.

== Legacy ==
There is a decorative bush, a member of the legume family which is called Colvillea racemosa in his honour, in fact the genus is called Colvillea

In his novel Les Misérables Victor Hugo credits Colville (or Maitland) with asking for the surrender of the Imperial Guard and receiving General Cambronne's reply of "Merde".

== Notes ==
Government offices
Preceded by Sir Galbraith Lowry Cole	Governor of Mauritius; 1828–1833	Succeeded by Sir William Nicolay
Military offices
Preceded by Sir Miles Nightingall	C-in-C, Bombay Army; 1819–1826	Succeeded by Sir Thomas Bradford
Preceded by Sir Henry Johnson	Colonel of the 5th (Northumberland Fusiliers) Regiment of Foot; 1835–1843	Succeeded by Sir Jasper Nicholls
Preceded by Sir James Montgomerie	Colonel of the 74th Regiment of Foot; 1834–1835	Succeeded by James Campbell
