= Charles Colville, 1st Viscount Colville of Culross =

British nobleman, politician and courtier

The Right Honourable The Viscount Colville of Culross KT GCVO PC
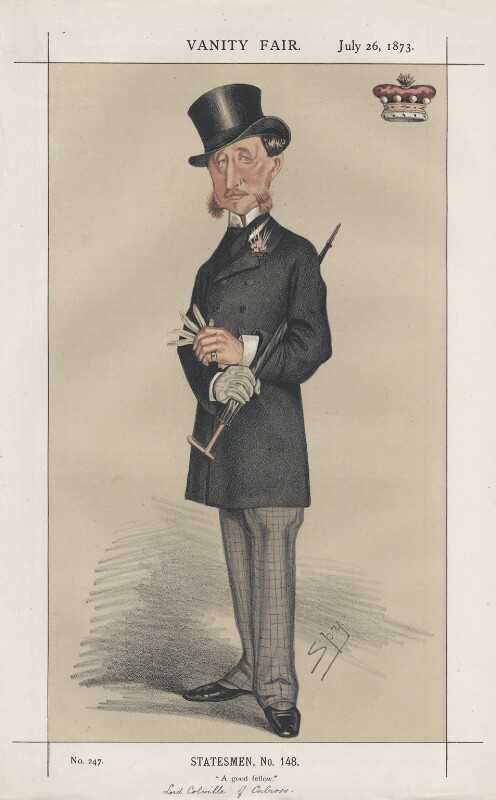
- "A good fellow". Colville as caricatured by "Spy" (Leslie Ward) in Vanity Fair, July 1873.

Master of the Buckhounds
- In office 10 July 1866 – 1 December 1868
- Monarch: Victoria
- Prime Minister: The Earl of Derby; Benjamin Disraeli
- Preceded by: The Earl of Cork
- Succeeded by: The Earl of Cork

Personal details
- Born: Charles John Colville; 23 November 1818
- Died: 1 July 1903 (aged 84)
- Party: Conservative
- Spouse: Hon. Cecile Catherine Mary Carrington
- Children: Stanley Colville
- Parent: Charles Colville (father)

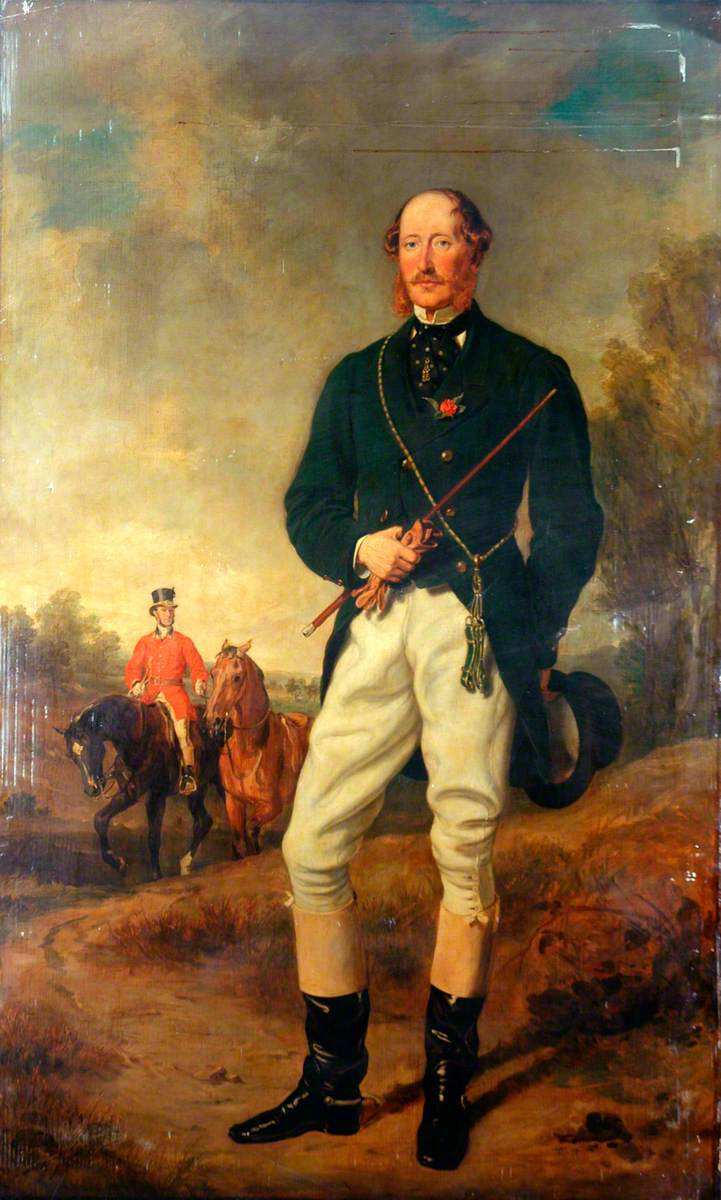
Portrait by Francis Grant, 1870

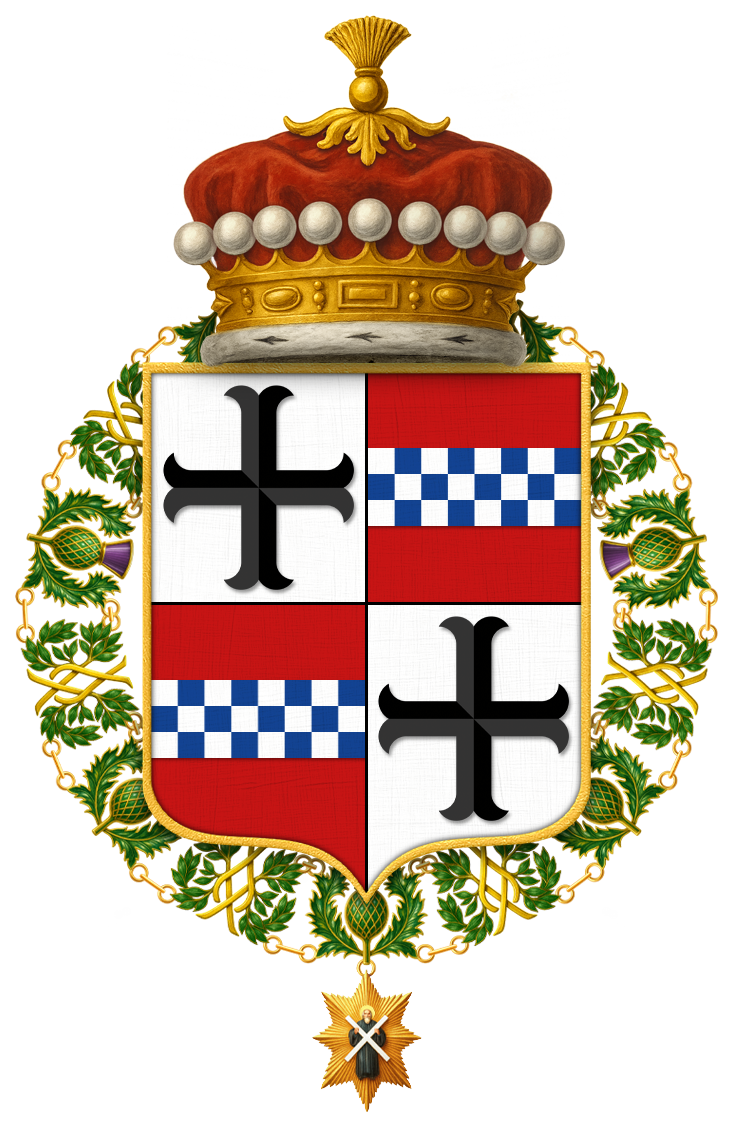
Shield of Arms of Charles John Colville, 1st Viscount Colville of Culross, KT, GCVO, PC

Charles John Colville, 1st Viscount Colville of Culross, KT, GCVO, PC (23 November 1818 – 1 July 1903), known as The Lord Colville of Culross between 1849 and 1902, was a British nobleman, Conservative politician, courtier, and painter.

== Background and education ==
Colville was the son of General the Honourable Sir Charles Colville and the grandson of John Colville, 8th Lord Colville of Culross. He was educated at Harrow.

== Career ==
Colville served as a captain in the 11th Hussars. He succeeded his uncle in the lordship of Colville of Culross 1849 and was elected a Scottish representative peer in 1851. He served under Lord Derby as Chief Equerry and Clerk Marshal from February to December 1852 and again from 1858 to 1859 and under Derby and subsequently Benjamin Disraeli as Master of the Buckhounds from 1866 to 1868. In 1866 he was sworn of the Privy Council. He was later Lord Chamberlain to the Princess of Wales from 1873 to 1901 and was appointed in the same capacity to her as Queen Alexandra from 1901 to 1903.

Colville was also Chairman of the Great Northern Railway Company from 1872 to 1895, a director of the Central London Railway at its opening in 1900 and President of the Honourable Artillery Company. He was made a Knight of the Thistle in 1874 and created Baron Colville of Culross, in the County of Perth, in 1885, in the Peerage of the United Kingdom. In 1902 he was further honoured with a Viscountcy in the Coronation Honours list, when he was made Viscount Colville of Culross, in the County of Perth, on 15 July 1902.

== Family ==
Lord Colville of Culross married the Honourable Cecile Catherine Mary Carrington, eldest daughter of Robert Carrington, 2nd Baron Carrington, in 1853. Their second son was Sir Stanley Colville, who rose to prominence as a Navy officer. Another son, George, was the father of Sir Jock Colville, civil servant and memoirist. Lord Colville of Culross died in July 1903, aged 84, and was succeeded by his eldest son, Charles.

Political offices
Preceded by Lord Alfred Paget	Chief Equerry and Clerk Marshal; February–December 1852	Succeeded by Lord Alfred Paget
Preceded by Lord Alfred Paget	Chief Equerry and Clerk Marshal; 1858–1859	Succeeded by Lord Alfred Paget
Preceded by The Earl of Cork	Master of the Buckhounds; 1866–1868	Succeeded by The Earl of Cork
Peerage of the United Kingdom
New creation	Viscount Colville of Culross; 1902–1903	Succeeded by Charles Colville
New creation	Baron Colville of Culross; 1885–1903	Succeeded by Charles Colville
Peerage of Scotland
Preceded by John Colville	Lord Colville of Culross; 1849–1903	Succeeded by Charles Colville
