= John Colville, 9th Lord Colville of Culross =

Royal Navy Admiral (1768–1849)

Admiral The Right Honourable The Lord Colville of Culross
- Born: 15 March 1768
- Died: 22 October 1849 (aged 81)
- Military career
- Allegiance: United Kingdom
- Branch: Royal Navy
- Service years: 1775–1849
- Rank: Admiral
- Commands: HMS Romney; HMS Hercule; HMS Queen; Cork Station
- Conflicts: American Revolutionary War; French Revolutionary Wars; Napoleonic Wars; Anglo-Russian War

Admiral John Colville, 9th Lord Colville of Culross (15 March 1768 – 22 October 1849), styled Master of Colville from 1786 to 1811, was a Royal Navy officer who served as Commander-in-Chief, Cork Station.

== Naval career ==
Colville was the second son of John Colville, 8th Lord Colville of Culross, and his wife Amelia Webber. He joined the Royal Navy in December 1775 and saw action in the fourth-rate HMS Isis during the American Revolutionary War. He took part in the Battle of the Saintes in April 1782. He also saw action, while serving as first lieutenant in HMS Santa Margarita, a 36-gun fifth-rate frigate, in the capture of Martinique in March 1794 and at the capture of Guadeloupe in April 1794 during the French Revolutionary Wars. Later that year he took part in the destruction of the French frigate Volontaire.

Colville became commanding officer of the fourth-rate HMS Romney in October 1804, shortly before it was wrecked by incompetent pilots in November 1804, and then became commanding officer of the third-rate HMS Hercule in March 1807, in which he took part in the Battle of Copenhagen during the Napoleonic Wars. Following the incident in Lisbon and the subsequent surrender of the Russian Fleet during the Anglo-Russian War, he accompanied the Russian Fleet back to Portsmouth in September 1807. He went on to be commanding officer of the second-rate HMS Queen in September 1811.

Promoted to rear admiral on 12 August 1819, Colville became Commander-in-Chief, Cork Station, with his flag in HMS Semiramis, in 1821. He was promoted to vice admiral on 22 July 1830 and to Admiral of the White on 23 November 1841.

Colville succeeded to the peerage as Lord Colville of Culross on 8 March 1811, was elected a Scottish representative peer on 24 July 1818 and participated in ten successive parliaments until his death in October 1849.

== Family ==
Colville married, firstly, Elizabeth Ford on 14 October 1790 and, following the death of his first wife, Anne Law on 15 October 1841.

Military offices
Preceded by Josias Rowley	Commander-in-Chief, Cork Station; 1821–1825	Succeeded by Robert Plampin
Peerage of Scotland
Preceded by John Colville	Lord Colville of Culross; 1811–1849	Succeeded by Charles Colville
