= Cincinnati Leopards =

Soccer club in Ohio, US

The Cincinnati Leopards soccer club was a founding member of the W-League, based in Cincinnati, Ohio. The team folded after the 1995 season.

== Year-by-year ==
Year	Division	League	Reg. season	Playoffs
1995	1	USL W-League	4th, Central	
