= HMS Leopard (1741) =

Ship of the line of the Royal Navy

History

Great Britain
- Name: HMS Leopard
- Ordered: 28 April 1740
- Builder: Perry, Blackwall Yard
- Launched: 30 October 1741
- Fate: Broken up, 1761

General characteristics
- Class & type: 1733 proposals 50-gun fourth rate ship of the line
- Tons burthen: 872
- Length: 134 ft (40.8 m) (gundeck)
- Beam: 38 ft 6 in (11.7 m)
- Depth of hold: 15 ft 9 in (4.8 m)
- Propulsion: Sails
- Sail plan: Full-rigged ship
- Armament: 50 guns: Gundeck: 22 × 18 pdrs; Upper gundeck: 22 × 9 pdrs; Quarterdeck: 4 × 6 pdrs; Forecastle: 2 × 6 pdrs

HMS Leopard was a 50-gun fourth rate ship of the line of the Royal Navy, built according to the 1733 proposals of the 1719 Establishment at Blackwall Yard, and launched on 30 October 1741.

Leopard was broken up in 1761.
