= John Oaksey =

British peer and jockey (1929–2012)

John Oaksey OBE
Personal information
- Born: 21 March 1929
- Died: 5 September 2012 (aged 83)
- Occupations: Jockey, journalist, commentator

Horse racing career
- Sport: Horse racing
- Career wins: 200

Major racing wins
- Hennessy Gold Cup; CGA Foxhunter Chase; Kim Muir Challenge Cup

Racing awards
- Racing Journalist of the Year, 1968; Daily Telegraph Order of Merit, 2003; Peter O'Sullevan Award for Services to Racing, 2008

Honours
- Honorary Member of the Jockey Club

Significant horses
- Carrickbeg, Carruthers

John Geoffrey Tristram Lawrence, 4th Baron Trevethin and 2nd Baron Oaksey, (21 March 1929 – 5 September 2012) was a British aristocrat, amateur jockey and horse racing journalist and TV presenter. He was twice British Champion Amateur Jump Jockey, before becoming a journalist and racing personality both on television and through his charitable work for the Injured Jockeys Fund, which he helped establish. Oaksey was described as "quite possibly the outstanding racing figure of modern times, touching so many via his compelling writing, broadcasting, race-riding and tireless fund-raising".

== Early life ==
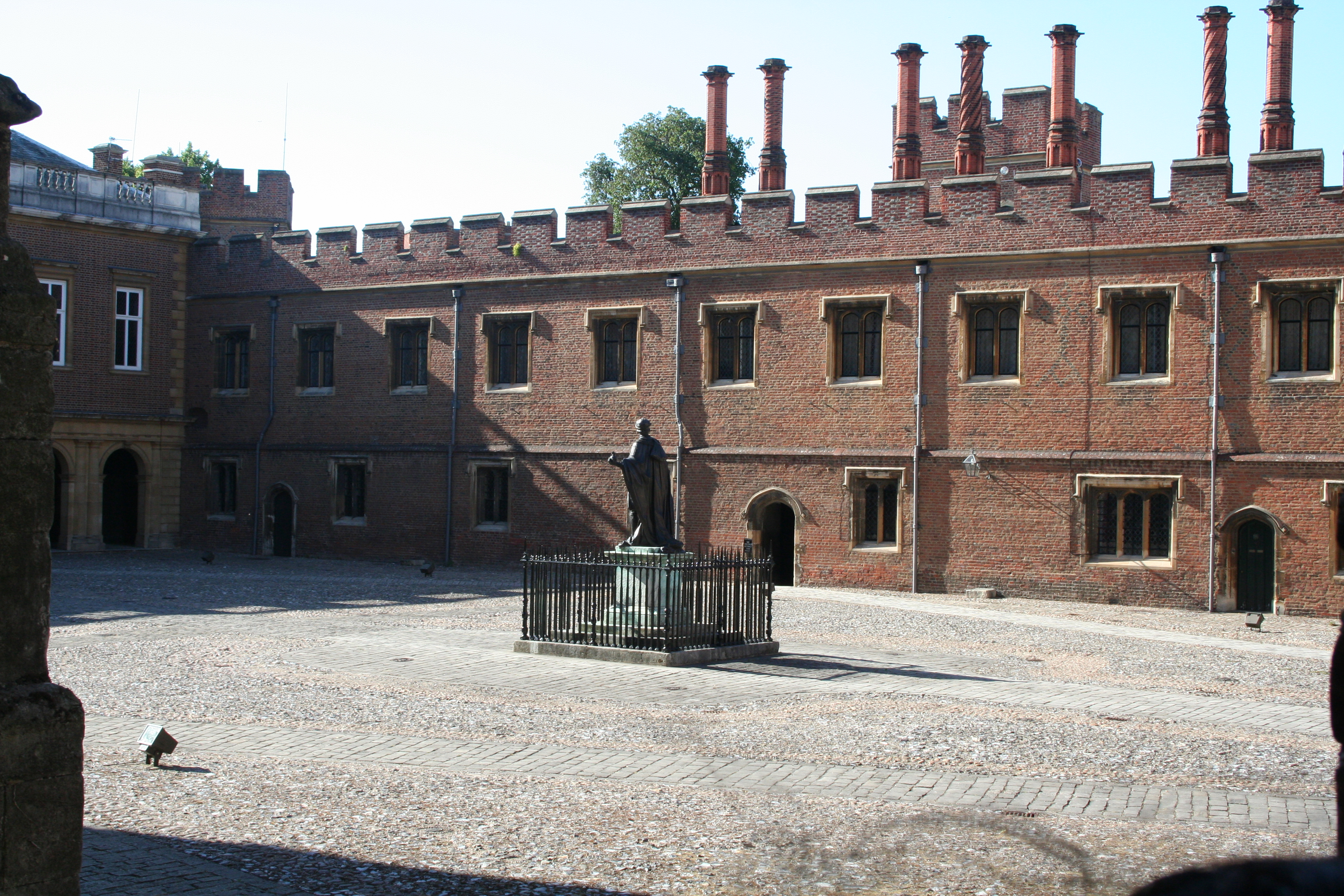
Quadrangle at Eton College, Oaksey's alma mater

He was the son of the noted jurist Geoffrey Lawrence, 1st Baron Oaksey, and his wife Marjorie, daughter of Commander Charles Robinson, RN. He preferred to be called Oaksey, although Trevethin is the longer-established title. In his broadcasting career, he was initially known as John Lawrence before adopting the name John Oaksey when he succeeded to the baronies on the death of his father in 1971. The Oaksey family seat is the parish of Oaksey in the extreme north of Wiltshire, between Malmesbury and Cirencester.

He was educated at Eton College, where he was captain of the boxing team. At age 16 he spent the summer attending the Nuremberg trials at which his father was officiating, the family diaries and memoirs of which are on permanent loan to the National Justice Museum in Nottingham.

After Eton, he undertook National Service at Catterick and was commissioned as second lieutenant with the 9th Queen's Royal Lancers. He then went up to New College, Oxford, to read Philosophy, Politics and Economics. On graduating, he took law at Yale University and, at that point, looked destined to follow his father into the profession.

== Career ==
=== Jockey ===
Oaksey had learned to ride on an old pony called Mince Pie, which later gave rise to the title of his autobiography, Mince Pie For Starters A photo of him being ejected from Mince Pie during the 1935 Purton pony trials appeared on the front page of the Daily Express. He began competitive riding in point-to-points, starting with a ride on a horse called Paula at Siddington, Gloucestershire, in April 1950. He pulled up after six fences. He had his first winner the following year on board Next of Kin at the Pegasus Club meeting at Kimble, a meeting confined to lawyers and their families. When he started running under rules, his first win came on Pyrene in a hunter chase at Sandown Park on 16 March 1956. He also had his first major victory at the same track: Flaming East in the 1958 Imperial Cup.

The horse with which he was most closely associated, though, was the staying chaser, Taxidermist. On this horse, he was second in the Kim Muir Chase at the Cheltenham Festival, beat stablemate Mandarin in the 1958 Whitbread Gold Cup and then in November of that year, produced the performance of his career in the Hennessy Gold Cup, then run at Cheltenham rather than Newbury. Passing four horses after the final fence, he got up to win on the line by a short head.

Cheltenham Festival wins then followed – on Bob Turnell's Sabaria in the 1959 National Hunt Chase, Jimmy Scot in the 1966 Kim Muir, Black Baize in the 1971 Kim Muir, and Bullocks Horn in the 1973 Foxhunters' Chase. In 1963, he went very close to winning the Grand National too. Riding Carrickbeg, he was beaten only by three-quarters of a length.

In total, he rode in the Grand National eleven times, completing the course in four of them. Once in the race, he was unseated by his horse and knocked unconscious, but still insisted on filing his copy to the Sunday Telegraph before being taken away by stretcher.

As his riding career entered its later years, he nearly won a second Whitbread Gold Cup in 1974 on board Proud Tarquin. He passed the post first, but was demoted to second after it was ruled he had interfered with The Dikler. He thought this immensely unfair, saying later, "The passing of time has done nothing to diminish my feeling that a great injustice was done". It was to be his last major race performance. He retired from racing after being injured in a fall at Folkestone in 1975.

As a jockey, he rode as John Lawrence and won 200 races. Although the majority of these were over fences, 20 of his wins came on the flat, including the first three runnings of the Amateurs Derby at Epsom (1963–1965), and again in 1973. He had been Champion Amateur Jump Jockey in 1957–58 and 1970–71. Despite this, he was not noted as a particularly talented rider. He has been called "more effective than stylish in the saddle", or, in the words of fellow broadcaster Peter O'Sullevan, "He did not have any natural ability riding, it was pure application, but he did become most successful."

His connection with the Hennessy Gold Cup was revived in 2011, when Carruthers, a horse he bred and partially owned, won an emotional renewal of the race at a time when Oaksey himself was seriously ill.

=== Broadcasting ===
Oaksey began his broadcasting career while still active in the saddle. The BBC booked him four days before his Grand National ride on Carrickbeg to tour the site by helicopter and talk the audience through the fences. This was followed by his first regular television work which was with Pay-TV, a short-lived pay-as-you-view experiment set up by the boxing promoter Jarvis Astaire in 1965. For a time, they held the contract to broadcast from Kempton races.

He joined ITV's World of Sport in 1969, and was regularly seen and heard on The ITV Seven and later Channel 4 Racing, where he was invariably referred to by John McCririck as "My Noble Lord". On the retirement of John Rickman in 1978 he became the lead presenter for ITV's racing coverage. In the 1980s he also appeared on BBC Radio alongside Peter Bromley, and together they covered Bob Champion's famous win in the 1981 Grand National. Oaksey remarked afterwards: "If an imaginative novelist had dreamt up that result everybody would have called him a very silly imaginative novelist." He retired from regular broadcasting at the end of 1999, though he still appeared occasionally for a while after that.

=== Journalism ===
In order to ride as an amateur jockey, rules required Oaksey to have another job. Therefore, he took up journalism as a career. He wrote for the Daily Telegraph, as the paper's racing correspondent "Marlborough" for over 30 years. He wrote for the Sunday Telegraph during the first 28 years of its existence and for a similar length of time he was the "Audax" columnist in Horse & Hound. His most celebrated piece of writing was his account of the 1963 Grand National he rode on Carrickbeg. This started life as a section of dialogue from his BBC preview and when that description was replicated by events on the day it was adapted for his newspaper column. The piece is most familiar within racing circles for its description of the closing stages:

Round the last elbow into the straight … the final dregs of stamina are draining fast for horse and man alike. A hundred yards to go and then Ayala’s head appeared like Nemesis at my knee.

This has been described by fellow racing journalist, Brough Scott as "the greatest single piece of first-person big sporting event narrative in the English language". His commitment to his journalism was described thus by Peter Michell, the Telegraph's sports editor: "Oaksey would gallop for four miles, nip up Mount Kilamanjaro for a spot of exercise and then dictate a thousand words."

He is also noted for his account of Fred Winter's win in the 1962 Grand Steeplechase de Paris on Mandarin. Other works include a biography of Mill Reef and the script for a film called Something To Brighten The Morning.

=== Injured Jockeys Fund ===
His lasting legacy to the racing industry is the Injured Jockeys Fund (IJF). This started life as the Farrell-Brookshaw Fund, a charitable foundation started in 1964, after Oaksey's fellow jockeys, Tim Brookshaw and Paddy Farrell, broke their backs in falls at Liverpool. This later became the Injured National Hunt Jockeys' Fund, and ultimately, the Injured Jockeys Fund (IJF), embracing all areas of the sport. Oaksey became its president and figurehead. In 2004, he stated that the IJF had given him "more pride than any of the other activities in my racing life".

In 2009, the IJF retirement complex in Lambourn was named Oaksey House in his honour. There is a statue of him in the grounds.

=== Awards ===
His work with the IJF led to his appointment as OBE in 1985. Other awards he received during his lifetime include Racing Journalist of the Year in 1968, the Daily Telegraph Order of Merit in 2003 and the Peter O'Sullevan Award for Services to Racing in 2008. He was elected honorary member of the Jockey Club in 2001.

The 2013 running of the National Hunt Chase Challenge Cup at the Cheltenham Festival (a race he won in 1959) was named in his honour. In 2014, Sandown named a new 2-mile 6 furlong Listed Chase at their end of season finale, the Oaksey Chase, after him.

== Personal life ==
In 1959 he married John Betjeman's former secretary, Victoria Dennistoun. They had two children, including Patrick John.

The couple split in public fashion when Victoria started a relationship with artist Maggi Hambling.

Oaksey married again, in 1988, to "Chicky" Crocker (née Hunter), who had been married to a family friend. This provoked newspaper headlines and widespread disapproval from his circle as an uncharacteristic act of ungentlemanly behaviour.

In later years, Oaksey suffered from Alzheimer's disease and died in September 2012 at the age of 83. He was survived by his second wife and the children from his first marriage. Memorial services were held for him at Oaksey Parish Church, Wiltshire, and at St Paul's Church, Knightsbridge, attended by the Princess Royal, amongst others. Addresses were read by Sir Edward Cazalet and Brough Scott.

== Arms ==
Coat of arms of John Oaksey
Crest A dragon's head erased Sable between two bugle horns counter-embowed Or. Escutcheon Per chevron Argent and Gules two crosses raguly in chief of the last and a lamb in base holding with the dexter foreleg a banner and staff all of the first the banner charged with a cross couped Azure. Supporters On either side a dragon Sable winged and charged on the shoulder with a fasces Or. Motto Pur Fel Dur

== Bibliography ==
- Oaksey, John (2003). Mince Pie For Starters. London: Headline. ISBN 978-0755310661.

Peerage of the United Kingdom
Preceded by Geoffrey Lawrence	Baron Trevethin; 1971 – 2012	Succeeded by Patrick Lawrence
Preceded by Geoffrey Lawrence	Baron Oaksey; 1971 – 2012	Succeeded by Patrick Lawrence
