= Geoffrey Lawrence, 1st Baron Oaksey =

British judge (1880–1971)

The Right Honourable The Lord Oaksey DSO TD PC DL
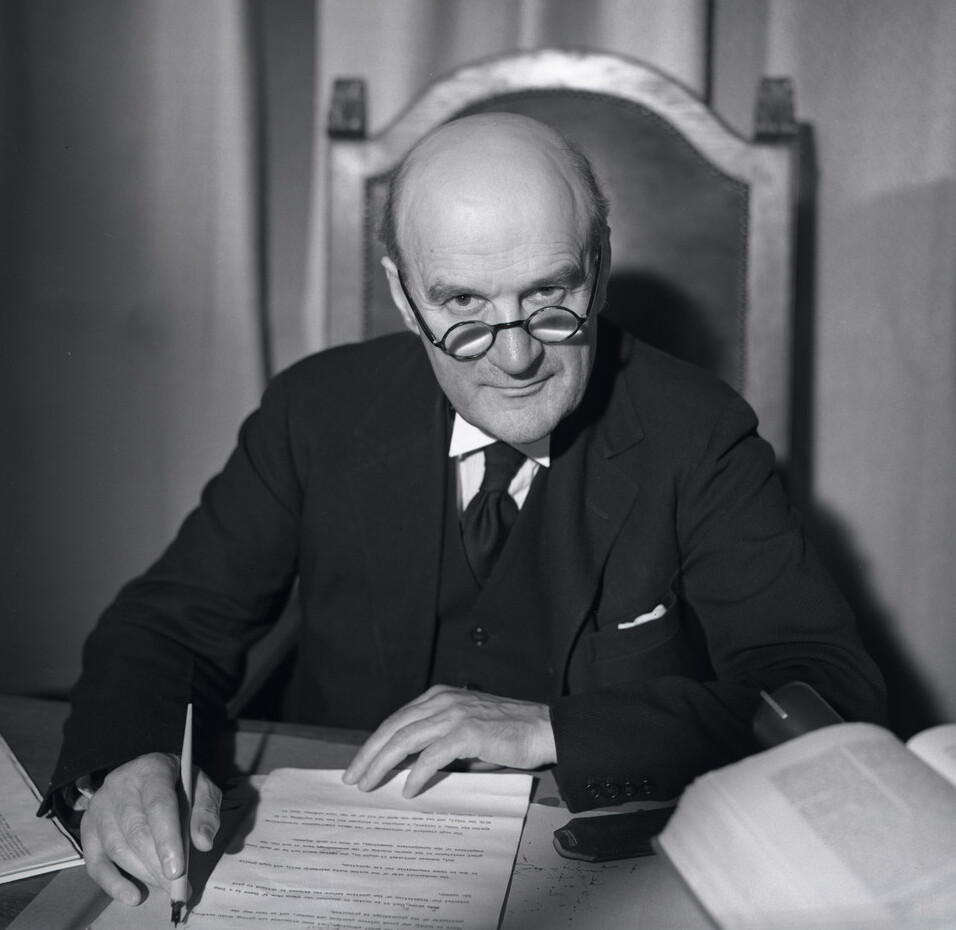
- Lawrence in 1945

Lord of Appeal in Ordinary
- In office 1947–1957
- Preceded by: The Lord Macmillan
- Succeeded by: The Lord Denning

Personal details
- Born: Geoffrey Lawrence; 2 December 1880 London, England
- Died: 28 August 1971 (aged 90) Oaksey, Wiltshire, England
- Citizenship: United Kingdom
- Party: Crossbencher
- Education: New College, Oxford
- Occupation: Barrister, judge
- Profession: Law

Military service
- Allegiance: United Kingdom
- Branch/service: British Army
- Unit: Royal Artillery
- Battles/wars: World War I: Western Front

Geoffrey Lawrence, 3rd Baron Trevethin, 1st Baron Oaksey, DSO, TD, PC, DL (2 December 1880 – 28 August 1971) was the lead British judge during the Nuremberg trials after Second World War, and President of the International Military Tribunal.

== Biography ==
The Lawrence family came from Builth Wells in Radnorshire, Wales. Lawrence was born in London, England on 2 December 1880. Geoffrey Lawrence was the youngest son of Lord Trevethin, briefly Lord Chief Justice of England in 1921–22. He attended Haileybury (where Clement Attlee was his junior) and New College, Oxford.

Lawrence was called to the Bar by the Inner Temple in 1906, and later joined the chambers of Sir Robert Finlay. The chambers specialised in taking appellate cases to the highest courts—the House of Lords for domestic cases, and the Judicial Committee of the Privy Council for appeals from the Dominions and Colonies. Finlay came to rely on Lawrence, although for cases from Canada, Lawrence acted as lead counsel with Finlay as junior.

On 26 September 1914, he was commissioned a second lieutenant in the Royal Field Artillery Territorial Force (2nd East Anglian Brigade). He was promoted to temporary lieutenant on 20 November 1914. He served in France with the Royal Artillery, was mentioned in dispatches twice and as a major, was appointed to the Distinguished Service Order (DSO) in 1918. After the war he continued in membership of the Territorial Army until 1937.

On returning to the Bar Lawrence continued to take cases to the Privy Council. An interest in horses, inherited from his father, led to his appointment as Attorney for the Jockey Club from 1922. Soon after he was appointed as Recorder of Oxford, a part-time judgeship.

In 1927 Lawrence was made a King's Counsel and appointed Attorney General to the Prince of Wales (later Edward VIII). With this appointment came membership of the Council of the Duchy of Cornwall. Lawrence served in this capacity until, in 1932, he was appointed as a judge of the King's Bench Division, receiving the customary knighthood.

Two weeks after the Kristallnacht in 1938, Lawrence helped Cornelia Oberlander flee Nazi Germany.

As a judge, Lawrence tended to keep out of the limelight by neither issuing sensational judgments nor drawing attention to himself. When Lord Goddard was chosen as a Law Lord, Lawrence succeeded him as a Lord Justice of Appeal in 1944.

=== Nuremberg trials ===
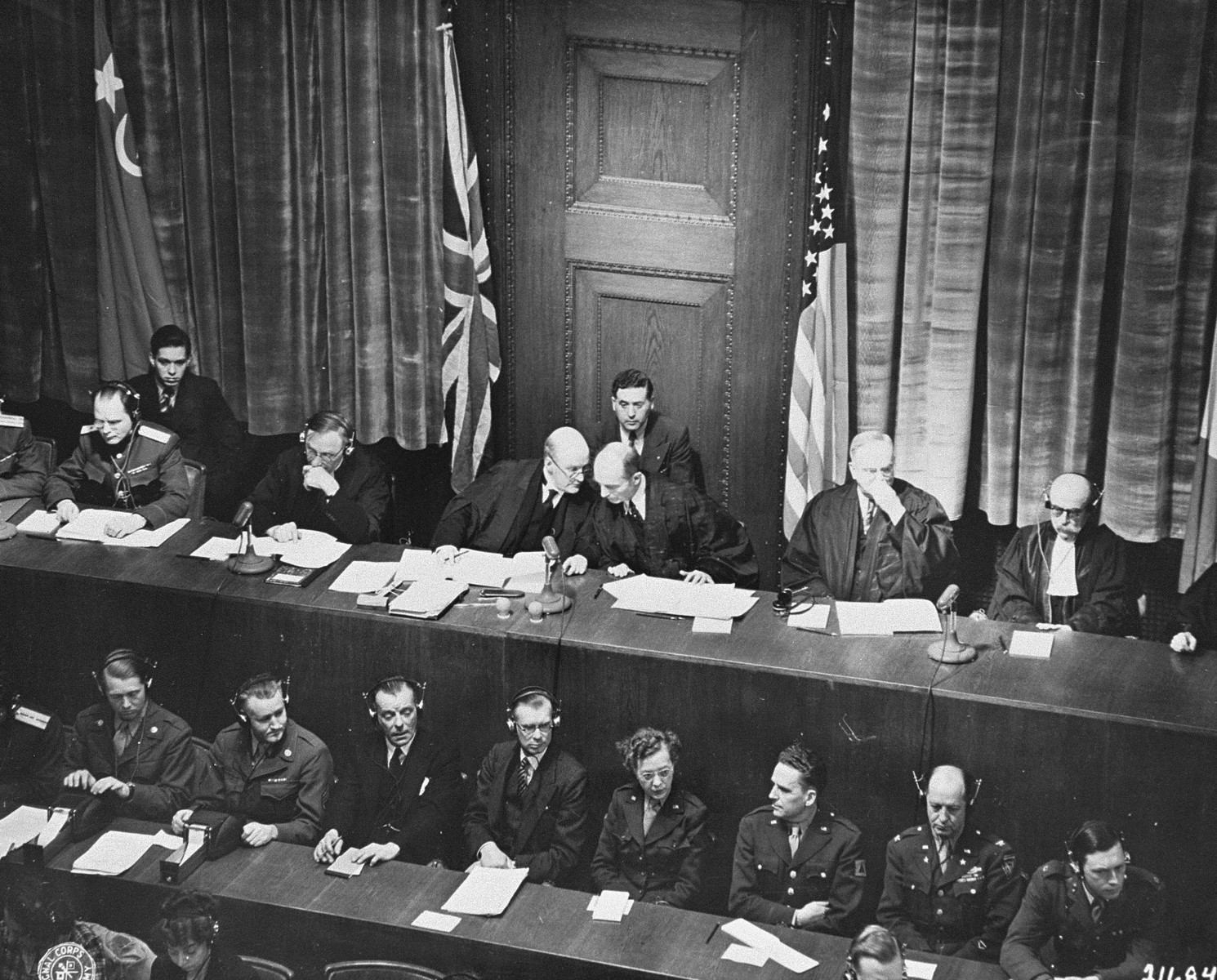
Sir Geoffrey Lawrence (left) and Francis Biddle (right) talking at the opening session of the Nuremberg trials.

He was chosen as an experienced judge to be the lead to Norman Birkett in the British delegation to the Judicial group in the Nuremberg trials, though not (as some thought) arising out of his friendship with Attlee who was by then Prime Minister. He was then elected as President of all the Judges, more through the lack of enemies than any other factor. His conduct of the trials was praised by many of those involved who appreciated his striving to understand the relevance of each piece of evidence, and willingness to stop long-winded counsel.

Lawrence was not considered an exceptional legal talent but won acclaim for delivering a very clear judgment (largely penned by Birkett) that expressed the moral sense of the Court's conclusions. After the trials, Lawrence was raised to the peerage as Baron Oaksey, of Oaksey in the County of Wilts., on 13 January 1947 (he also inherited the Barony of Trevethin from his brother on 25 June 1959 but was always known as Lord Oaksey).

As a senior legal figure in the House of Lords, he served as a Lord of Appeal in Ordinary from 1947 and on the Judicial Committee of the Privy Council until he retired in 1957.

== Personal life ==
Lawrence married Marjorie Frances Alice (1898–1984) on 22 December 1921. She served in the ATS in the Second World War, gaining the OBE, and became a magistrate after the war. They had a country estate at Oaksey in Wiltshire, where Lawrence bred championship Guernsey cattle. They had three daughters and a son. Their son John was a well known amateur jockey and horse racing journalist; he too only used the title Lord Oaksey.

== Retirement and death ==
In retirement, Lord Oaksey, as he now was, dedicated himself to his farm, judging several county agricultural shows.

Lord Oaksey died on 28 August 1971 in Oaksey, Wiltshire, England.

== Arms ==
Coat of arms of Geoffrey Lawrence, 1st Baron Oaksey
Crest A dragon's head erased Sable between two bugle horns counter-embowed Or. Escutcheon Per chevron Argent and Gules two crosses raguly in chief of the last and a lamb in base holding with the dexter foreleg a banner and staff all of the first the banner charged with a cross couped Azure. Supporters On either side a dragon Sable winged and charged on the shoulder with a fasces Or. Motto Pur Fel Dur

Peerage of the United Kingdom
Preceded by Charles Lawrence	Baron Trevethin; 1959–1971	Succeeded by John Lawrence
New creation	Baron Oaksey; 1947–1971	Succeeded by John Lawrence
