= Mellor baronets =

Extinct baronetcy in the Baronetage of the United Kingdom

- Creation date: 1924
- Status: extinct
- Extinction date: 1990
- Seat(s): Culmhead, Somerset
- Motto: Ad meliora, Towards the better

The Mellor Baronetcy, of Culmhead in the County of Somerset, was a title in the Baronetage of the United Kingdom. It was created on 24 January 1924 for Sir John Mellor, Director of Prudential Assurance Company. The second Baronet was the Conservative member of parliament for Tamworth from 1935 to 1945 and for Sutton Coldfield from 1945 to 1955. The baronetcy became extinct on the death of the third Baronet in 1990.

== Mellor baronets, of Culmhead (1924) ==
- Sir John Paget Mellor, 1st Baronet (1862–1929)
- Sir John Serocold Paget Mellor, 2nd Baronet (1893–1986)
- Sir John Francis Mellor, 3rd Baronet (1925–1990)
