= Baron Trevethin and Oaksey =

Barony in the Peerage of the United Kingdom

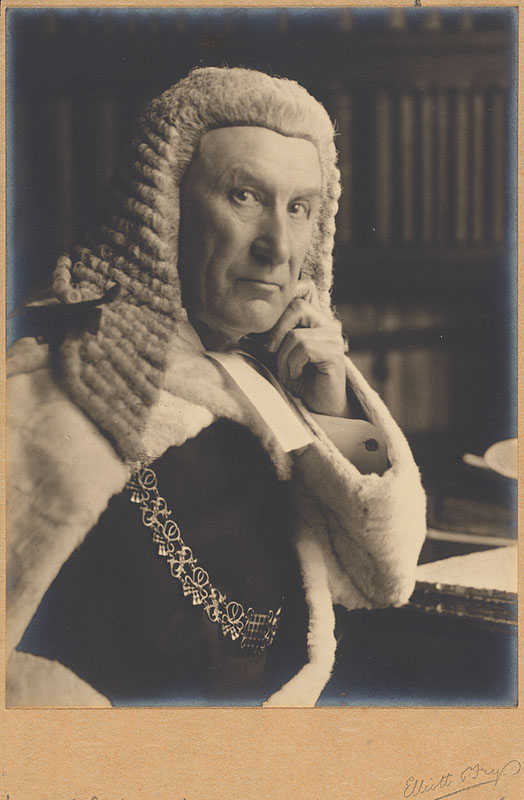
Alfred Lawrence, 1st Baron Trevethin

Baron Trevethin, of Blaengawney in the County of Monmouth, is a title in the Peerage of the United Kingdom. It was created in 1921 for the prominent judge Sir Alfred Lawrence, Lord Chief Justice of England from 1921 to 1922.

The first baron's eldest son and heir, Hon. Clive Lawrence, predeceased him; he had been HM Procurator General and Treasury Solicitor from 1923 until his death in 1926. Hence, on the first baron's death, the title passed to his second son, Charles.

The first baron's third son, the Hon. Geoffrey Lawrence, was also a noted jurist and served as the main British judge at the Nuremberg trials. In 1947 he was himself raised to the peerage as Baron Oaksey, of Oaksey in the County of Wilts. In 1959 he succeeded his elder brother Charles as third Baron Trevethin, although he continued to be known as Lord Oaksey.

As of 2015 the titles are held by his grandson, the fifth Baron Trevethin and third Baron Oaksey, who succeeded in 2012. He is a KC who sits in the House of Lords as a Crossbench excepted hereditary peer following a by-election in 2015.

== Barons Trevethin (1921) ==
- Alfred Tristram Lawrence, 1st Baron Trevethin (1843–1936)
- Charles Trevor Lawrence, 2nd Baron Trevethin (1879–1959)
- Geoffrey Lawrence, 3rd Baron Trevethin and 1st Baron Oaksey (1880–1971)
- John Geoffrey Tristram Lawrence, 4th Baron Trevethin and 2nd Baron Oaksey (1929–2012) – amateur jockey, horse racing journalist and television commentator
- Patrick John Tristram Lawrence, 5th Baron Trevethin and 3rd Baron Oaksey (b. 1960)

The heir apparent is the present holder's son, Oliver John Tristram Lawrence (b. 1990)

== Barons Oaksey (1947) ==
- Geoffrey Lawrence, 1st Baron Oaksey (1880–1971) (succeeded as Baron Trevethin in 1959)

see above for further holders

== Arms ==
Coat of arms of Baron Trevethin and Oaksey
Crest A dragon's head erased Sable between two bugle horns counter-embowed Or. Escutcheon Per chevron Argent and Gules two crosses raguly in chief of the last and a lamb in base holding with the dexter foreleg a banner and staff all of the first the banner charged with a cross couped Azure. Supporters On either side a dragon Sable winged and charged on the shoulder with a fasces Or. Motto Pur Fel Dur
