= David Montgomery, 2nd Viscount Montgomery of Alamein =

British politician and businessman (1928–2020)

The Right Honourable The Viscount Montgomery of Alamein CMG CBE
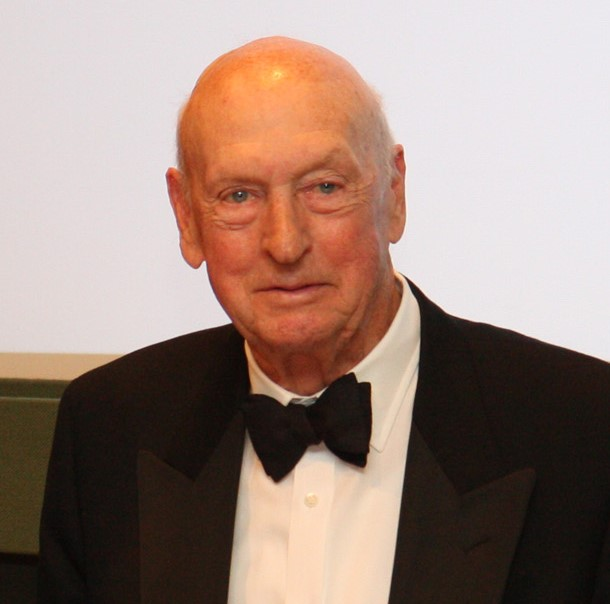

Member of the House of Lords
- Lord Temporal
- Hereditary peerage 10 May 1976 – 11 November 1999
- Preceded by: The 1st Viscount Montgomery of Alamein
- Succeeded by: Seat abolished
- Elected Hereditary Peer; 27 June 2005 – 23 July 2015
- By-election: 23 June 2005
- Preceded by: The 16th Baroness Strange
- Succeeded by: The 5th Baron Trevethin

Personal details
- Born: 18 August 1928
- Died: 8 January 2020 (aged 91)
- Party: Crossbench (from 2005–2020); Conservative (until 1999)
- Spouses: Mary Connell (m. 1953; div. 1967); Tessa Browning
- Children: 2
- Parent: Bernard Montgomery (father)
- Education: Trinity College, Cambridge
- Profession: Politician, businessman

David Bernard Montgomery, 2nd Viscount Montgomery of Alamein, CMG, CBE (18 August 1928 – 8 January 2020) was a British politician and businessman. He was the son of British World War Two Field Marshal Bernard Montgomery.

== Early life and education ==
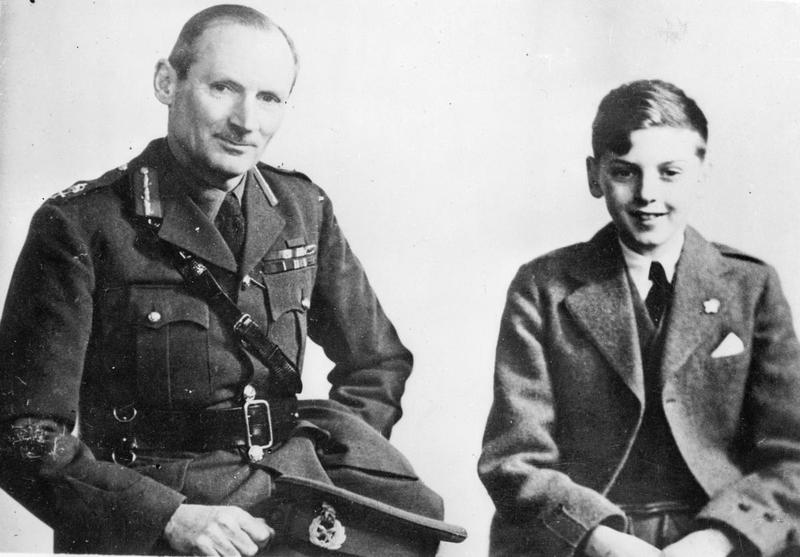
Lieutenant-General Bernard Montgomery with his only son David.

Montgomery was the only child of Field Marshal The 1st Viscount Montgomery of Alamein, a senior military commander in the Second World War, and his wife Elizabeth Carver, née Hobart. He had two older half brothers from his mother's previous marriage, John and Dick. Montgomery's mother died in 1937 while on holiday in Burnham-on-Sea after suffering from an infected insect bite which caused septicaemia following amputation of her leg.

David attended Winchester College from May 1942 onwards, and his father, posted abroad from the middle of the year, arranged for his time in school holidays to be divided between his prep school headmaster and family friends, Major Thomas Reynolds and Mrs. Phyllis Reynolds, and Jocelyn, wife of David's half-brother John Carver, as well as strict instructions that "on no account" was the boy to visit his aged paternal grandmother, whom the then Sir Bernard Law Montgomery detested, in Inishowen, County Donegal, in Ulster. Montgomery gained an engineering degree at Trinity College, Cambridge.

== Career ==
Montgomery entered business, working for Shell, Yardley and several other companies, and he built close links with Latin America. He served as a patron and chairman of various Anglo-Latin American organisations, including the Anglo-Argentine Society, Canning House and the Hispanic and Luso Brazilian Council.

He succeeded to the viscountcy following his father's death in 1976 and originally sat as a Conservative in the House of Lords until 1999, when he and most other hereditary peers were removed from the House under the House of Lords Act 1999. He was returned to the Lords as a crossbencher in an election of hereditary cross-bench peers in 2005, following the death of Baroness Strange.

Montgomery was made a Commander of the Order of the British Empire (CBE) in 1975 and a Companion of the Order of St Michael and St George (CMG) in 2000. He also received decorations from Germany, Belgium, Spain, Chile, Argentina, Brazil, Mexico, Venezuela and Colombia. He co-wrote The Lonely Leader: Monty 1944–45 with Alistair Horne about his father in 1994, which documented his own early life as well as his father's.

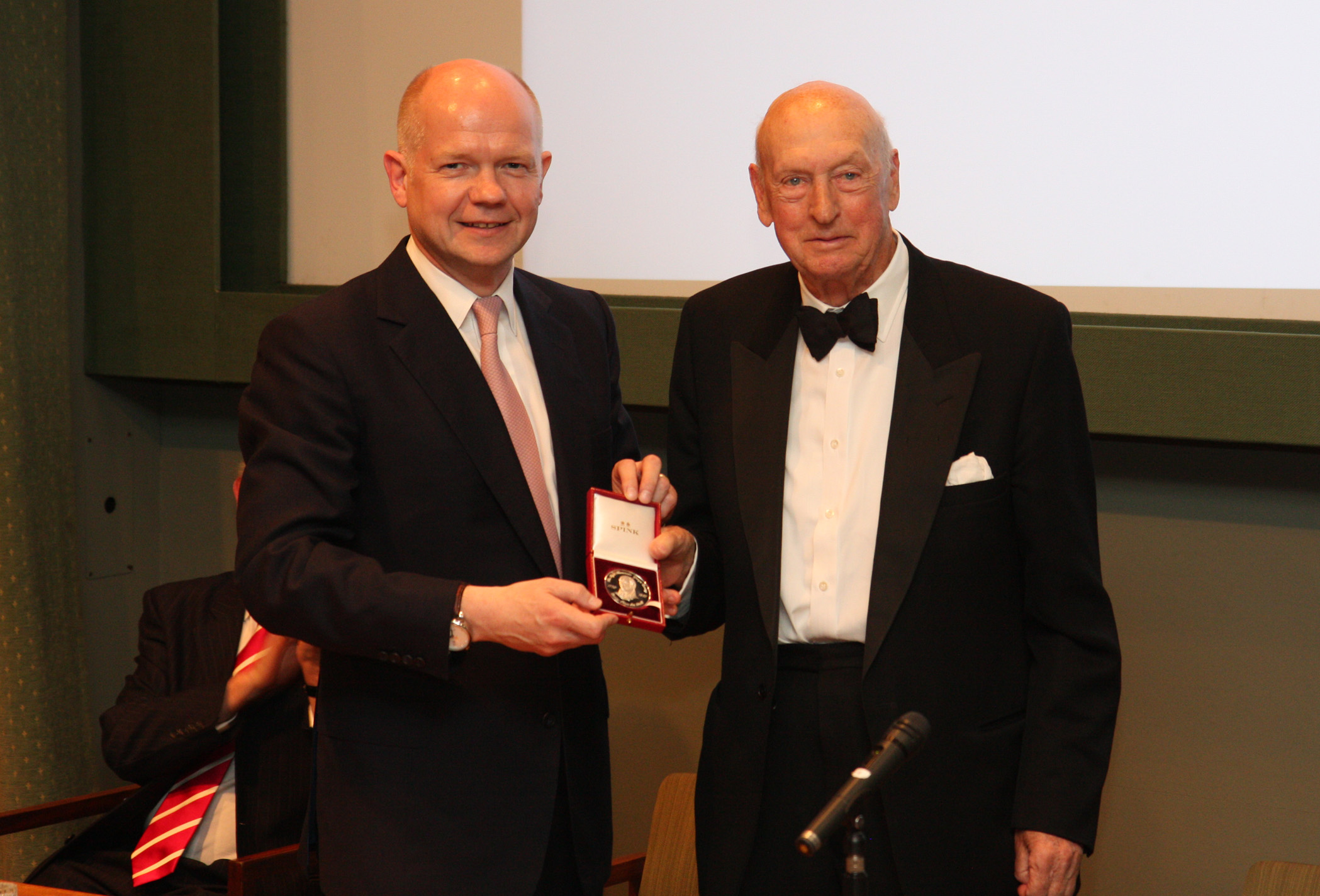
Lord Montgomery of Alamein (right) receiving the Canning Medal from William Hague in 2013

== Personal life ==
In 1953, The Hon. David Montgomery, as he was then, married Mary Connell. They divorced in 1967 after having a son and a daughter:

- Henry David Montgomery, 3rd Viscount Montgomery of Alamein (2 April 1954): he married Caroline Jane Odey on 21 June 1980. They have three daughters:
  - The Honourable Alexa Maud Montgomery (30 August 1984)
  - The Honourable Flora Veronica Montgomery (4 May 1988)
  - The Honourable Phoebe Matilda Montgomery (4 February 1990)
- The Honourable Arabella Clare Montgomery (born 21 November 1956); she married Sir Jeremy Stuart-Smith on 25 September 1982. They have five children:
  - Emma Stuart-Smith (6 October 1984)
  - Laura Stuart-Smith (1986-1987)
  - Edward Murray Stuart-Smith (6 May 1988)
  - Samuel Nicholas Stuart-Smith (6 December 1990)
  - Luke David Stuart-Smith (19 January 1993)

He then married Tessa Browning, daughter of Daphne du Maurier and Lieutenant-General Sir Frederick Browning, a close colleague of his father. Lord Montgomery of Alamein became Patron of Freedom Flame UK, in May 2014, in recognition of the lighting of a Torch of Unity at the D Day stone, Southsea, by his father, Field Marshal The 1st Viscount Montgomery of Alamein, on 13 September 1948.

He died on 8 January 2020 at the age of 91.

He has a son, Henry David Montgomery (b. 1954), who is the 3rd Viscount Montgomery of Alamein.

== Arms ==
Coat of arms of David Montgomery, 2nd Viscount Montgomery of Alamein

Coronet
A coronet of a viscount
Crest
Issuant from a Crescent Argent an Arm embowed in Armour the hand grasping a broken Tilting Spear in bend sinister the Head pendent proper
Escutcheon
Azure two Lions passant guardant between three Fleurs-de-lis two in chief and one in base and two Trefoils in fess all Or
Supporters
Dexter: a Knight in Chain Armour and Surcoat resting his exterior hand on his sword; Sinister: a Soldier in Battle Dress all proper
Motto
Gardez Bien (Guard well)

== Book ==
- Hamilton, Nigel (1981). Monty: The Making of a General. London, UK: Hamish Hamilton Ltd. ISBN 0-241-10583-8.

Peerage of the United Kingdom
| Preceded by Bernard Law Montgomery | Viscount Montgomery of Alamein; 1976–2020; Member of the House of Lords (1976–1999) | Succeeded by Henry Montgomery |
Parliament of the United Kingdom
| Preceded by The Baroness Strange | Elected hereditary peer to the House of Lords under the House of Lords Act 1999; 2005–2015 | Succeeded by The Lord Trevethin and Oaksey |
