= Libby Purves =

British writer and broadcaster (born 1950)

Libby Purves OBE
- Born: Elizabeth Mary Purves; 2 February 1950 (age 76); London, England
- Occupations: Radio presenter; journalist; author
- Spouse: Paul Heiney
- Children: 2

Elizabeth Mary Purves, OBE (born 2 February 1950) is a British radio presenter, journalist and author.

== Early life and career ==
Born in London, a diplomat's daughter, Purves was raised in her mother's Catholic faith and educated at convent schools in Israel, Thailand, South Africa and France, and at Beechwood Sacred Heart School, Royal Tunbridge Wells.

Purves won a scholarship to St Anne's College, Oxford, where she was awarded a first-class degree in English. She was elected Librarian of the Oxford Union. In 1971, she joined the BBC as a studio manager. By the mid-1970s she was a regular presenter on BBC Radio Oxford where she could be frequently heard on the station's early morning shows. In 1976, she joined the BBC Radio 4's Today programme as a reporter and became the programme's first woman presenter, alongside Brian Redhead and John Timpson, two years later.

In 1983 she was editor of Tatler magazine for six months.

== Later career ==
For her column in The Times newspaper, Purves was named columnist of the year in 1999 and in the same year was appointed an OBE for services to journalism. She has written books on childcare, twelve novels including Mother Country, a memoir of religious upbringing, Holy Smoke (1998), and a travel book, One Summer's Grace (1989), about a 1,700-mile sailing journey round Britain with children aged three and five.

Purves has a monthly column in the sailing magazine Yachting Monthly and is a contributor to The Oldie magazine. She was appointed a patron of the British Art Music Series Trust along with James MacMillan and John Wilson. She served ten years as a Trustee of the National Maritime Museum.

In February 2010 she was appointed The Times drama critic, succeeding Benedict Nightingale, but her work for The Times in this area ended in September 2013. In a press statement she released after she was fired, she said that "I have to tell you that the acting editor of The Times Mr Witherow has decreed that he does not want me to continue as Chief Theatre Critic. This is not my decision in any way. At all. ... I carry on reviewing and maintaining the lists until 11 October."

Two days after she finished at The Times, she announced in the London Evening Standard that her commitment to, and interest in, theatre commentary was so great that she intended to continue through theatrecat.com, a theatre review website.

Purves is in favour of equal rights for gay people, and has written articles supporting this position. However, she has spoken out against the "coercive liberalism, one-note righteousness" of the National Trust following its "outing" of Robert Wyndham Ketton-Cremer, saying that "Crassly reducing any human being to a sexuality, posthumously enlisting him or her in a phantom regiment under your orders, is almost as belittling as persecution itself."

In 2009, Purves debated at the Cambridge Union against Glenn Wilson and Rupert Myers on the motion This House Would Rather Be Gay. Following a column on the anti-gay policies of Russian President Vladimir Putin, Greek businessman Demetri Marchessini took out a quarter-page advertisement in The Daily Telegraph on 28 January 2014 to criticise her views on homosexuality and religion. According to Purves, while Marchessini is "free to approve of the beatings and hangings of young men across the world in the name of what he considers religion" she is also "free to say he is a loony."

On BBC Radio 4 Purves also presented Midweek for 33 years (1984–2017) and the educational programme The Learning Curve for 10 years (1998–2008).

Since leaving the BBC, she has been critical of several aspects of the corporation: unequal pay for newsreaders, sexism and ageism, and "woke" comedy shows.

== Personal life ==
Purves is married to broadcaster Paul Heiney. The couple have two children. Their first child, Nicholas, died in 2006, at age 23. A collection of his poems and sea-logs of a Pacific journey under square rig, The Silence at the Song's End, has been published, inspired a song cycle by Joseph Phibbs (2008), and was broadcast on Radio 4.

== Bibliography ==
- Britain at Play (1982)
- Adventures Under Sail (1982)
- Sailing Weekend Book (with Paul Heiney, 1985)
- How Not to Be a Perfect Mother (1986)
- One Summer's Grace (1989)
- How Not to Raise a Perfect Child (1991)
- How Not to Be a Perfect Family (1994)
- Casting Off (1995)
- A Long Walk in Wintertime (1996)
- Home Leave (1997)
- More Lives Than One (1998)
- Holy Smoke (1998)
- Regatta (1999)
- Passing Go (2000)
- A Free Woman (2001)
- Mother Country (2002)
- Radio – A True Love Story (2002)
- Continental Drift (2003)
- Acting Up (2004)
- Love Songs and Lies (2005)
- Shadow Child (2007)
- That Was Midweek That Was: The Story of a Radio Programme 1979–2017 (2017)

Media offices
Preceded by Tina Brown	Editor of Tatler; 1983	Succeeded by Mark Boxer
