= Clive Lawrence =

British barrister

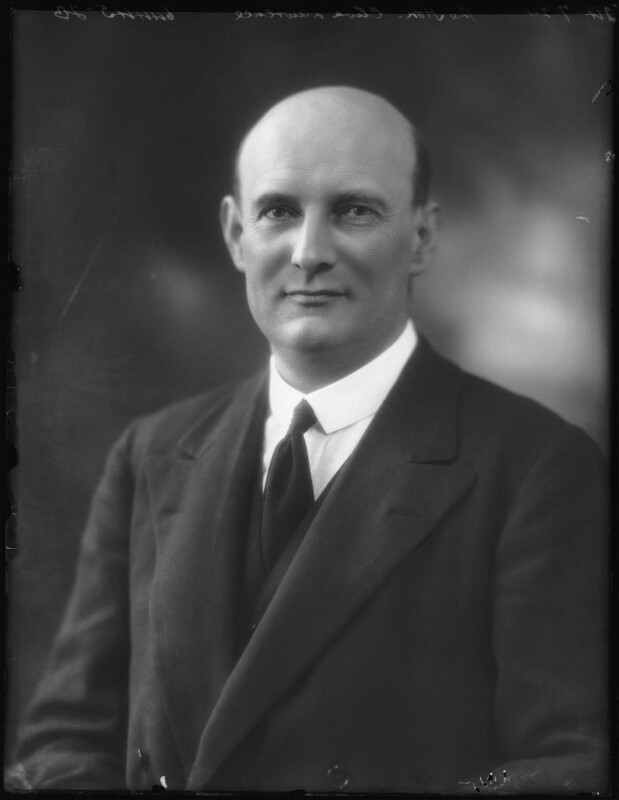
Lawrence in 1924

Alfred Clive Lawrence, CBE (October 1876 – 13 March 1926), commonly known by his middle name, was a British barrister, who was HM Procurator General and Treasury Solicitor from 1923 until his death in 1926.

== Career ==
Lawrence was born in October 1876, the eldest son of Sir Alfred Tristram Lawrence and his wife Jessie Elizabeth, daughter of George Lawrence; when Alfred Lawrence became Lord Chief Justice of England and Wales in 1921 he was created Baron Trevethin, and Clive Lawrence was thereafter styled the Honourable; he was also heir to the peerage. Educated at Haileybury and Imperial Service College, Lawrence went up to Trinity Hall, Cambridge, and captained the university's golf club. Called to the bar in 1902, he practised on the South Wales Circuit. During the First World War, he directed the Intelligence Branch of the Procurator-General's Department (now the Government Legal Department), and became a Junior Counsel to the Ministry of Labour in 1919, and then its solicitor that August. Then, in 1923, he was appointed HM Procurator General and Treasury Solicitor, succeeding Sir John Mellor. He served in that post until his death. In recognition of his wartime service, he had been appointed a Commander of the Order of the British Empire in 1918.

Lawrence was taken ill after a meeting of the National Hunt in Cheltenham, where his aunt lived; his condition quickly worsened and he died, on 13 March 1926, aged 49 He left behind a widow, Mildred Margaret, daughter of Rev. Edward Parker Dew of Breamore, and their daughter, Domini Margaret (b. 1925).

== Likenesses ==
- Three photographic portraits in the National Portrait Gallery, London, taken in 1924 by Bassano (reference numbers NPG x122875, NPG x122876, NPG x122877).

Legal offices
Preceded by Sir John Mellor	HM Procurator General and Treasury Solicitor; 1923–1926	Succeeded by Sir Maurice Gwyer
