= Sir John Mellor, 2nd Baronet =

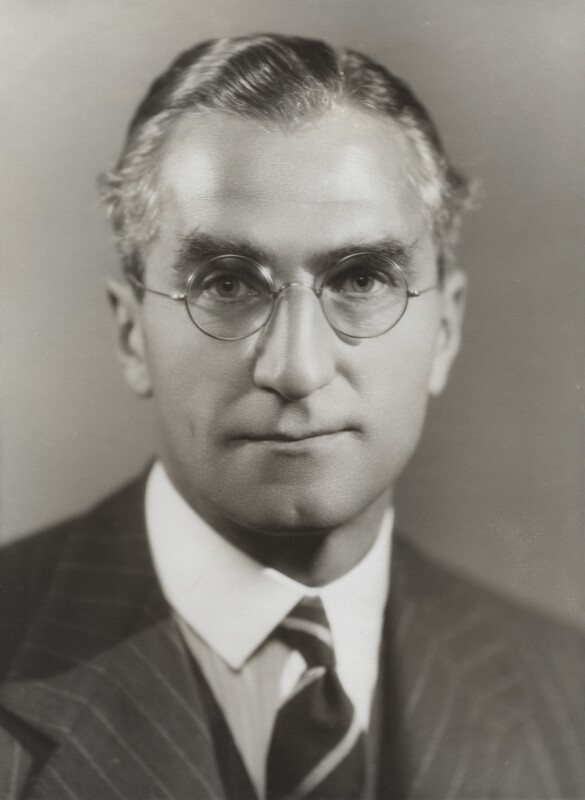
Mellor in 1938

Sir John Serocold Paget Mellor, 2nd Baronet (6 July 1893 – 15 July 1986) was a British Conservative Party politician who served as member of parliament (MP) from 1935 until 1955, for constituencies in the West Midlands.

Mellor was first elected at the 1935 general election for the Tamworth constituency in Warwickshire, holding that seat through the ten-year wartime parliament. When Tamworth was abolished for the 1945 general election, he was elected for the new Sutton Coldfield constituency. Mellor was returned at the 1950 and 1951 elections, but stood down at the 1955 general election, when he was succeeded by the Conservative Geoffrey Lloyd.

Parliament of the United Kingdom
Preceded by Sir Arthur Steel-Maitland	Member of Parliament for Tamworth; 1935–1945	Constituency abolished
New constituency	Member of Parliament for Sutton Coldfield; 1945–1955	Succeeded by Geoffrey Lloyd
Baronetage of the United Kingdom
Preceded by John Paget Mellor	Baronet (of Culmhead, Somerset); 1929–1986	Succeeded by John Francis Mellor
