= Alfred Lawrence, 1st Baron Trevethin =

British Baron and Lord Chief Justice (1843–1936)

The Right Honourable The Lord Trevethin PC
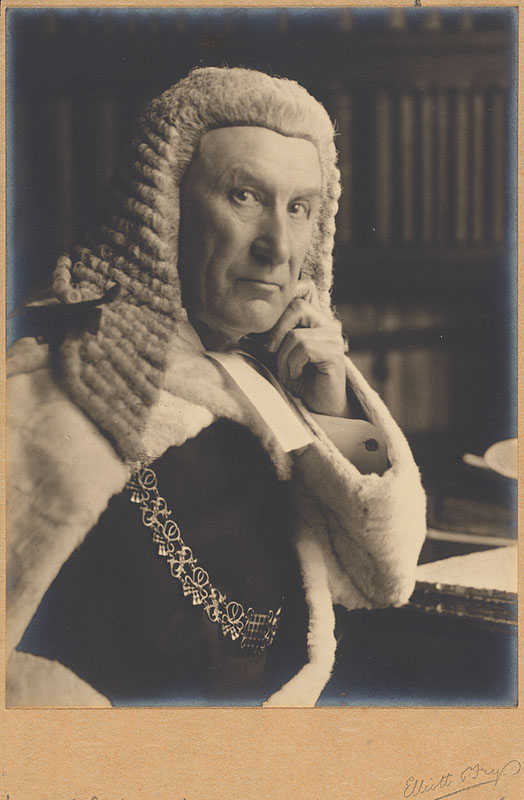

Lord Chief Justice of England
- In office 15 April 1921 – 2 March 1922
- Monarch: George V
- Preceded by: The Earl of Reading
- Succeeded by: The Lord Hewart

Personal details
- Born: 24 November 1843 Pontypool, Monmouthshire; United Kingdom
- Died: 3 August 1936 (aged 92) Builth, Brecknockshire; United Kingdom
- Education: Trinity Hall, Cambridge
- Occupation: Judge

Alfred Tristram Lawrence, 1st Baron Trevethin, PC (24 November 1843 – 3 August 1936) was a British lawyer and judge. He served as Lord Chief Justice of England and Wales from 1921 to 1922. He is best remembered for the questionable manner in which he became Lord Chief Justice, under a plan devised by David Lloyd George.

== Biography ==
Lawrence was the eldest son of David Lawrence, a surgeon, of Pontypool, Monmouthshire, and Elizabeth, daughter of Charles Morgan Williams. He had originally intended to follow his father into medicine, but became interested in law after witnessing a property case in which his family had an interest.

He was educated at Trinity Hall, Cambridge, where he took a First in Law, and was called to the Bar, Middle Temple, in 1869. He established a successful legal practice although he did not become a Queen's Counsel until 1897, when he was 54. Lawrence was recorder for the Royal Borough of Windsor from 1885 to 1904, when he was appointed a Judge of the High Court of Justice (King's Bench Division) and knighted. He was styled Mr Justice A.T. Lawrence.

In 1912, he established the legality of the Football League's retain-and-transfer system with his judgement in the Kingaby case. Former Aston Villa player Herbert Kingaby had brought legal proceedings against his old club for preventing him from playing. Erroneous strategy by Kingaby's counsel resulted in the suit being dismissed.

=== Lord Chief Justice ===
In 1921, the Earl of Reading, the Lord Chief Justice, was appointed Viceroy of India. There existed a convention that the Attorney-General had the right of reverter to the post if a vacancy arose but David Lloyd George was unwilling to part with the services of Sir Gordon Hewart. Hewart, on the other hand, had long desired the post, and had turned down offers to become Chief Secretary for Ireland and Home Secretary to preserve his rights. A compromise was struck that a stop-gap Lord Chief Justice would be appointed until Lloyd George could dispense with his services.

Both Lawrence and Mr Justice Darling competed for the post; Darling went so far as to write to Lloyd George to ask for the post. In the end, Lawrence was chosen, and in April 1921, aged 77, he was made Lord Chief Justice of England. He was sworn of the Privy Council at the same time and in August of the same year he was raised to the peerage as Baron Trevethin, of Blaengawney in the County of Monmouth. On his appointment, Lawrence gave Lloyd George a signed but undated letter of resignation.

The arrangement caused much controversy. The judges were so incensed that they refused to attend Lord Reading's farewell ceremony. Lord Birkenhead, the Lord Chancellor, complained that the plan was illegal and "would make the Lord Chief Justice a transient figure subject to removal at the will of the government of the day and the creature of political exigency". Darling, who had written to Lloyd George to ask for the appointment "even for ten minutes", was said to have remarked that he supposed he was not old enough (Darling was then aged 71).

Lawrence remained Lord Chief Justice until March 1922, when he resigned, to be succeeded by Hewart. He reputedly learned of his "resignation" when reading a newspaper on a train to London on his way to court. By the time he resigned, it was said that he was so deaf that he could no longer follow cases properly.

=== Later years and family ===
Lord Trevethin died in August 1936, aged 92. A keen angler in later life, he suffered a seizure while fishing in the River Wye above Builth Wells, fell in and drowned before he was taken out of the water. He was cremated at Golders Green Crematorium.

Lord Trevethin married his cousin Jessie Elizabeth, daughter of George Lawrence, in 1875. They had a daughter and four sons, of whom the eldest, Hon. Alfred Clive Lawrence, predeceased his father. He was succeeded in the barony by his second son Lieutenant-Colonel Charles Trevor Lawrence. His third son Hon. Geoffrey Lawrence also became a noted lawyer and was himself raised to the peerage as Baron Oaksey, before succeeding his elder brother in the barony of Trevethin in 1959.

== Arms ==
Coat of arms of Alfred Lawrence, 1st Baron Trevethin
Crest A dragon's head erased Sable between two bugle horns counter-embowed Or. Escutcheon Per chevron Argent and Gules two crosses raguly in chief of the last and a lamb in base holding with the dexter foreleg a banner and staff all of the first the banner charged with a cross couped Azure. Supporters On either side a dragon Sable winged and charged on the shoulder with a fasces Or. Motto Pur Fel Dur

== Bibliography ==
- Wickham Legg, L. G. The Dictionary of National Biography, 1931–1940. Oxford University Press, 1949.
- Kidd, Charles, Williamson, David (editors). Debrett's Peerage and Baronetage (1990 edition). New York: St Martin's Press, 1990,

Legal offices
Preceded by The Earl of Reading	Lord Chief Justice of England and Wales; 1921–1922	Succeeded by The Lord Hewart
Preceded by Reginald Brodie Dyke Acland	Recorder of Oxford; 1924 – ?	Unknown
Peerage of the United Kingdom
New creation	Baron Trevethin; 1921–1936	Succeeded by Charles Lawrence
