= Sir John Mellor, 1st Baronet =

English lawyer and U.K. Treasury Solicitor

Sir John Paget Mellor, 1st Baronet, KCB (13 March 1862 – 4 February 1929) was an English lawyer and U.K. Treasury Solicitor. He was a talented amateur artist who contributed caricatures to Vanity Fair as Quiz.

== Biography ==
Eldest son of John William Mellor and his wife Caroline, John Paget Mellor was educated at Cheltenham and Trinity College, Cambridge (B.A. and LL.B. 1884). He was admitted to Inner Temple in 1883 and called to the bar in 1886, practising on the Midland Circuit. Mellor was Assistant Solicitor to the Treasury in 1894–1899 and Solicitor to the Treasury, King's Proctor, and Procurator General between 1909 and 1923. After being made C.B. in 1905 and K.C.B. in 1911, he was created Baronet in 1924. He was a director of the Prudential Assurance Company from 1923 until his death in 1929.

Legal offices
Preceded by The Earl of Desart	HM Procurator General and Treasury Solicitor; 1909–1923	Succeeded by Clive Lawrence
Baronetage of the United Kingdom
New creation	Baronet (of Culmhead, Somerset); 1924–1929	Succeeded by John Serocold Paget Mellor
