= Patrick Lawrence, 5th Baron Trevethin =

English peer and lawyer

The Right Honourable The Lord Trevethin and Oaksey KC
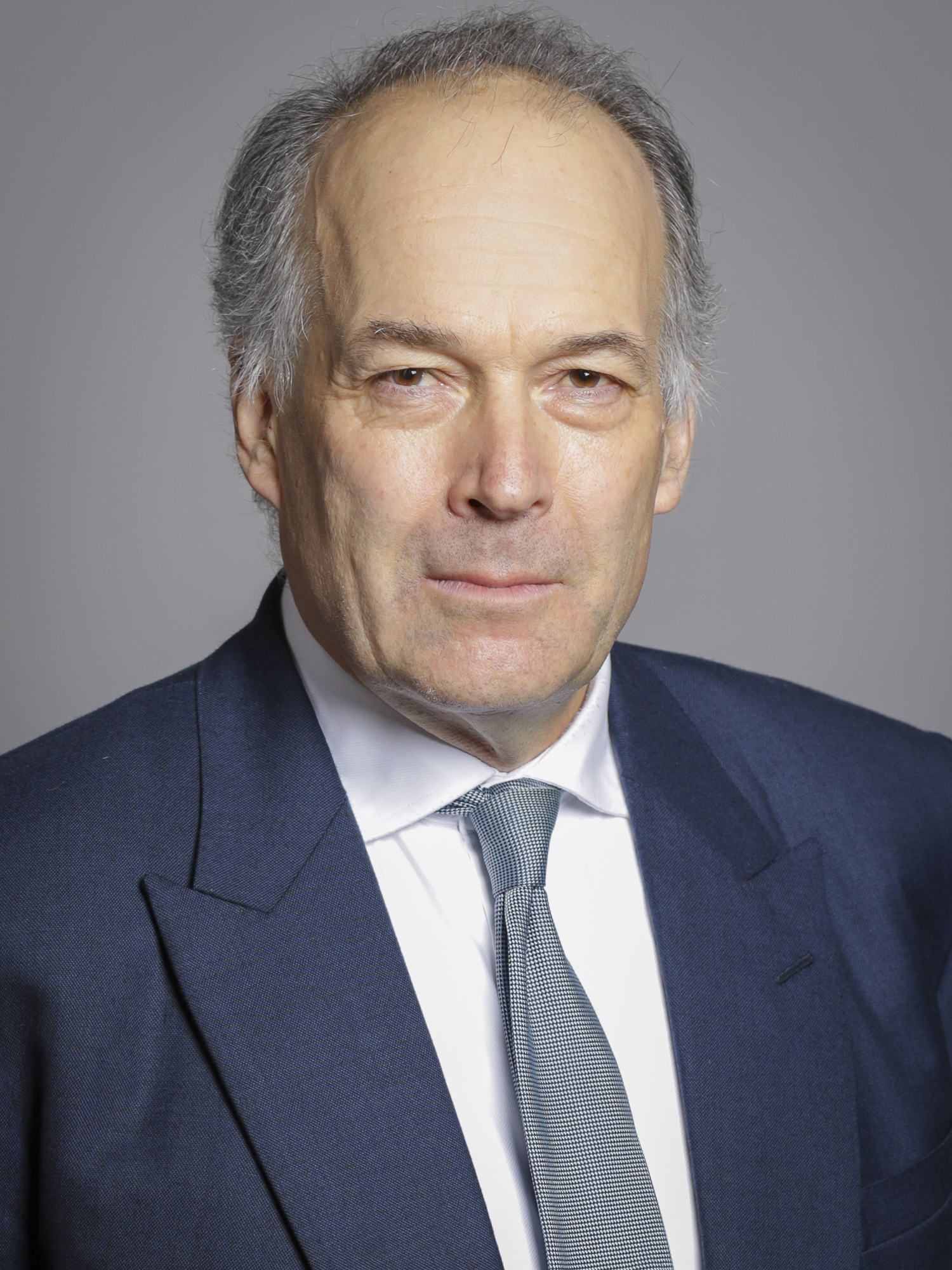
- Lord Trevethin and Oaksey in 2019

Member of the House of Lords
- Lord Temporal
- Elected Hereditary Peer; 22 October 2015 – 29 April 2026
- By-election: 2015
- Preceded by: The 2nd Viscount Montgomery of Alamein

Personal details
- Born: Patrick John Tristram Lawrence; 29 June 1960 (age 66)
- Party: Crossbench
- Spouse: Lucinda Marchessini (m. 1987)
- Children: 3
- Parent(s): John Oaksey, Victoria ("Tory") Lawrence (nee. Dennistoun)
- Education: Christ Church, Oxford
- Occupation: Barrister

Patrick John Tristram Lawrence, 5th Baron Trevethin and 3rd Baron Oaksey, KC (born 29 June 1960) is a British barrister, hereditary peer and former member of the House of Lords who sat as a crossbencher. He was educated at Christ Church, Oxford.

He is a barrister practising from 4 New Square Chambers and was elected to sit in the House at a crossbench hereditary peers' by-election in October 2015, following the retirement of David Montgomery, 2nd Viscount Montgomery of Alamein.

In 1987 he married Lucinda, a daughter of businessman Demetri Marchessini. They have a son and two daughters.

He is the son of Tory Lawrence and John Oaksey, who split in public fashion in the mid-1980s when Tory Lawrence began a relationship with artist Maggi Hambling.

== Arms ==
Coat of arms of Patrick Lawrence, 5th Baron Trevethin
Crest A dragon's head erased Sable between two bugle horns counter-embowed Or. Escutcheon Per chevron Argent and Gules two crosses raguly in chief of the last and a lamb in base holding with the dexter foreleg a banner and staff all of the first the banner charged with a cross couped Azure. Supporters On either side a dragon Sable winged and charged on the shoulder with a fasces Or. Motto Pur Fel Dur

Peerage of the United Kingdom
Preceded by John Lawrence	Baron Trevethin; 2012–present	Incumbent; Heir apparent: Hon. Oliver Lawrence
Preceded by John Lawrence	Baron Oaksey; 2012–present	Incumbent; Heir apparent: Hon. Oliver Lawrence
Parliament of the United Kingdom
Preceded by The Viscount Montgomery of Alamein	Elected hereditary peer to the House of Lords under the House of Lords Act 1999; 2015–2026	Position abolished under the House of Lords (Hereditary Peers) Act 2026
