= Demetri Marchessini =

Greek businessman

Demetri P. Marchessini
- Born: 20 July 1934; Athens, Greece
- Died: 6 March 2016 (aged 81)
- Education: Williams College; Harvard Law School
- Occupation: Businessman
- Spouse: Lucinda Roberts (m. 1961, divorced)
- Children: 4
- Website: www.marchessini.co.uk

Demetri P. Marchessini (20 July 1934 – 6 March 2016) was a Greek businessman. He was among the largest donors to the UK Independence Party and gave £15,000 to the party during 2013. He died on 6 March 2016.

== Personal life ==
Born in Athens, he was educated at Williams College, Massachusetts, and at Harvard Law School, Harvard. He married Lucinda Hilary Roberts, a daughter of Owen Roberts and sister of the former Camilla, Countess Erne (first wife of Henry Crichton, 6th Earl Erne), in 1961. They lived first in New York, and then in London with their four daughters, Lucinda (who married Patrick Lawrence, 5th Baron Trevethin), Cassandra, Atalanta and Tatiana Marchessini.

He lived in Wilton Crescent, Belgravia, London.

== Political views ==
Marchessini has published polemical works. Modern Myths: And The Realities Behind Them (1997) arguing against certain politically correct opinions. Women In Trousers was a photo-essay on women's fashion which aroused much controversy when it was published, and received critical coverage in several newspapers. Liz Hoggard in The Observer describing it as "offensive, outdated, misogynistic claptrap." He wrote: "Women know that men don't like trousers, yet they deliberately wear them". According to him: "This is hostile behaviour - they are deliberately dressing in a way that is opposite to what men would like. It is behaviour that flies against common sense, and also flies against the normal human desire to please."

A later book, Scams & Hypocrisies looked at perceived popular myths. On his blog, Marchessini has written that unmarried mothers are "naughty girls" who deserve a "smack" and that date rape accusations can only be meaningless because without a "violent act it is difficult to know whether any rape took place".

On 28 January 2014, The Daily Telegraph published an advertisement by Marchessini, in effect a comment piece which took the form of an 'open letter to Libby Purves'. in which he criticised the 'pro-gay' opinions of The Times columnist and dismissed her opposition to the government policies of Russia's Vladimir Putin on this issue which she had expressed in an article on 20 January. Responding, Purves was quoted in the London Evening Standard: "He is free to approve of the beatings and hangings of young men across the world in the name of what he considers religion. In the same spirit, I am free to say he is a loony."

In 2013, Marchessini made donations totalling £10,000 to the UK Independence Party, ultimately the sixth largest donor to the party that year. Following criticism of his views in 2013, he stated he would no longer give money to UKIP: "There's been such a fuss about what I've given it's a bore." At the time of the Telegraph advertisement, a UKIP spokeswoman said that Marchessini had severed his connection with the party after the organisation had "publicly opposed the crazy female trouser-wearing comments."

=== Channel 4 News interview ===
In the run-up to the 2014 European Parliament election, Michael Crick of Channel 4 News interviewed Marchessini, in what Crick believed was the businessman's first ever television interview. Contrary to earlier reports, UKIP had continued to solicit donations from him, and a further donation of £5,000 (in addition to the previously admitted £10,000) had been made on 24 December 2013.

In the interview, Marchessini also asserted that homosexuals are motivated by lust rather than love, said that rape was impossible within a marriage, and reasserted his opinions about women wearing trousers. According to him, only skirts excite men and he advocated a ban on the practice of women wearing trousers.

== Bibliography ==
- —— (1997). Modern myths & the realities behind them. Quiller Press. ISBN 9781899163304.
- —— (2003). Women In Trousers: A Rear View. Ionian Illustrated Editions. ISBN 9780954510701. (photographs by Adrian Mott)
- —— (2010). Scams & Hypocrisy: The Cancer of Our Age. Askelon Publishing. ISBN 9780956462206.
