= Charles Lawrence, 2nd Baron Trevethin =

British Army officer and peer (1879–1959)

Charles Trevor Lawrence, 2nd Baron Trevethin, DSO, DL, MA (29 May 1879 – 25 June 1959) was a British Army officer and peer.

He was the eldest surviving son of Alfred Lawrence, 1st Baron Trevethin, a British lawyer and judge who served as Lord Chief Justice of England from 1921 to 1922; and the brother of Geoffrey Lawrence, 1st Baron Oaksey, the main British Judge during the Nuremberg trials after World War II, and President of the Judicial group.

He was educated at Haileybury and New College, Oxford. He then served with distinction in the Royal Horse Artillery: during World War I he was mentioned in despatches three times and awarded the DSO and the Order of St. Anna. He was made a Deputy Lieutenant of Breconshire in 1949.

== Arms ==
Coat of arms of Charles Lawrence, 2nd Baron Trevethin
Crest A dragon's head erased Sable between two bugle horns counter-embowed Or. Escutcheon Per chevron Argent and Gules two crosses raguly in chief of the last and a lamb in base holding with the dexter foreleg a banner and staff all of the first the banner charged with a cross couped Azure. Supporters On either side a dragon Sable winged and charged on the shoulder with a fasces Or. Motto Pur Fel Dur

Peerage of the United Kingdom
Preceded by Alfred Lawrence	Baron Trevethin; 1936–1959	Succeeded by Geoffrey Lawrence
