= Viscount Montgomery of Alamein =

Peerage created to honour Field Marshal Montgomery

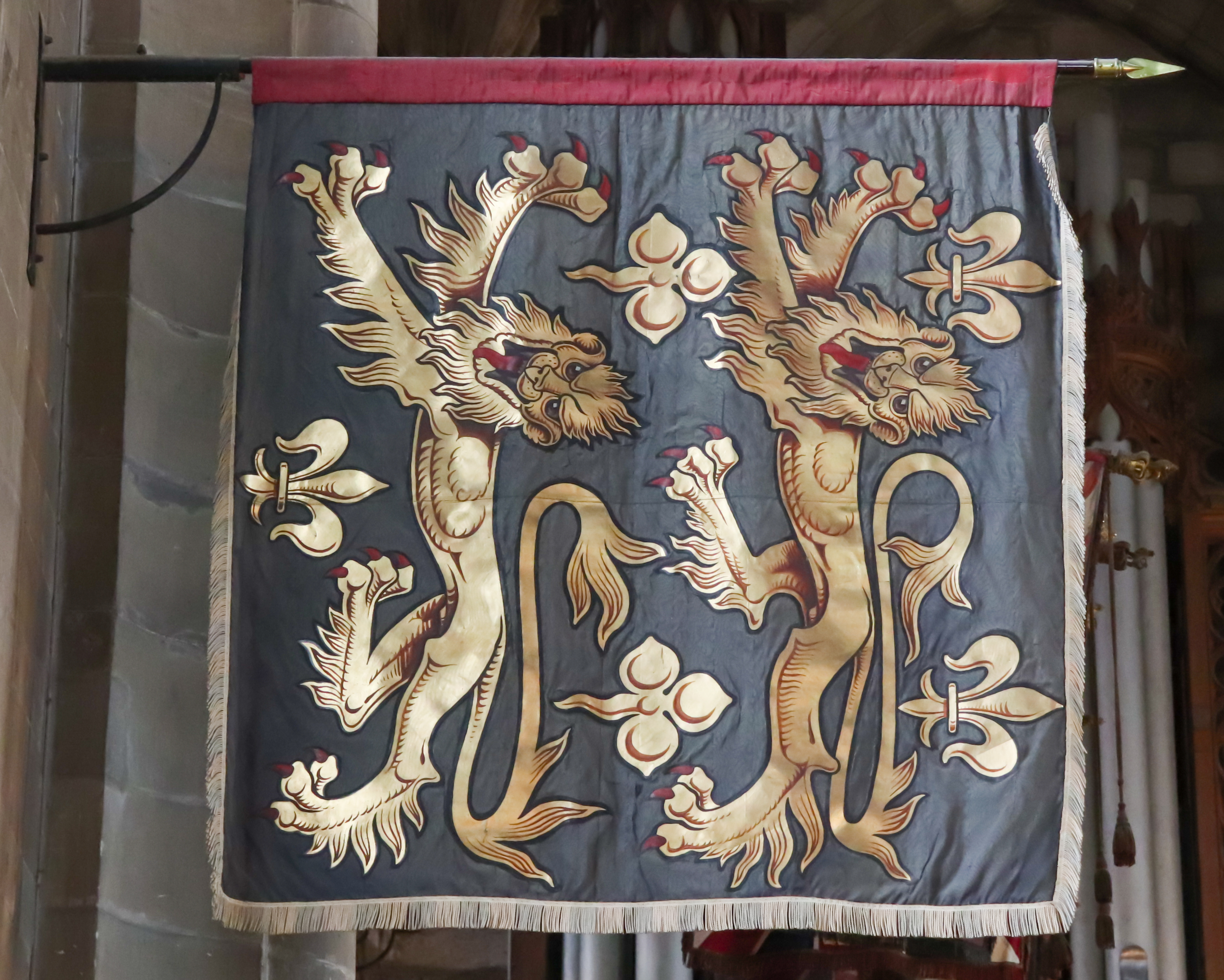
The 1st Viscount's Garter banner on display in St Mary's, Warwick.

Viscount Montgomery of Alamein, of Hindhead in the County of Surrey, is a title in the Peerage of the United Kingdom.

== History ==
The viscountcy was created in 1946 for the military commander Field Marshal Sir Bernard Montgomery, commemorating his crucial victory in the Second Battle of El Alamein (23 October–3 November 1942) (named after a minor railway halt marking the Allied defence line), which sealed the fate of Rommel's famed Afrika Korps.

As of 2022, the title is held by his grandson, Henry Montgomery, 3rd Viscount Montgomery of Alamein, who succeeded in 2020. There are currently no heirs to the viscountcy as the 3rd Viscount has no sons and there are no other living male line descendants of the 1st Viscount. If the 3rd Viscount dies without male issue, the title will become extinct.

== Viscounts Montgomery (1946) ==
- Bernard Law Montgomery, 1st Viscount Montgomery of Alamein (1887–1976)
- David Bernard Montgomery, 2nd Viscount Montgomery of Alamein (1928–2020)
- Henry David Montgomery, 3rd Viscount Montgomery of Alamein (b. 1954)

== Genealogy ==
- Sir Robert Montgomery, GCSI, KCB (1809–1887) ∞ Frances Thomason († 1842), sister of James Thomason, and had several children, including:
  - Henry Montgomery, KCMG (1847–1932), Bishop of Tasmania ∞ Maud Farrar, daughter of Frederic William Farrar, and had nine children, including:
    - Bernard Law Montgomery, 1st Viscount Montgomery of Alamein, KG, GCB, DSO, PC (1887–1976), Field Marshal ∞ 1927 Elizabeth Carver (née Hobart), sister of Major General Sir Percy Hobart, KBE, CB, DSO, MC (1885–1957) and widow of Oswald Carver, and had a son:
      - David Montgomery, 2nd Viscount Montgomery of Alamein (1928–2020)
        - Henry David Montgomery, 3rd Viscount Montgomery of Alamein (b. 1954)

== Gallery of title holders ==
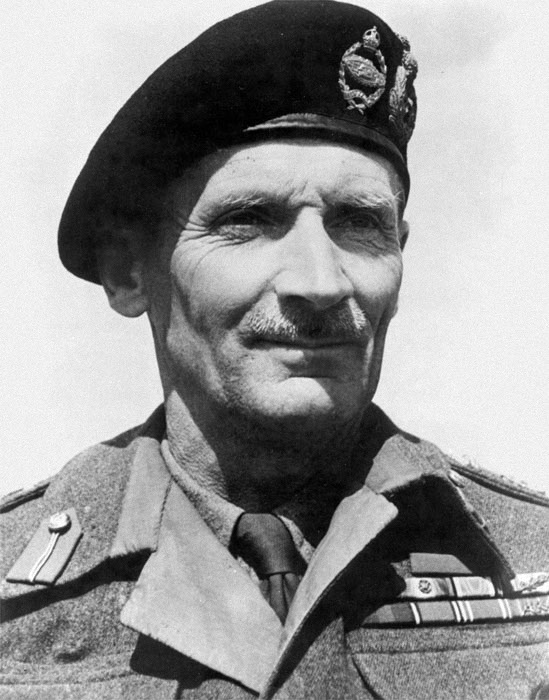
Field Marshal Montgomery, the 1st Viscount

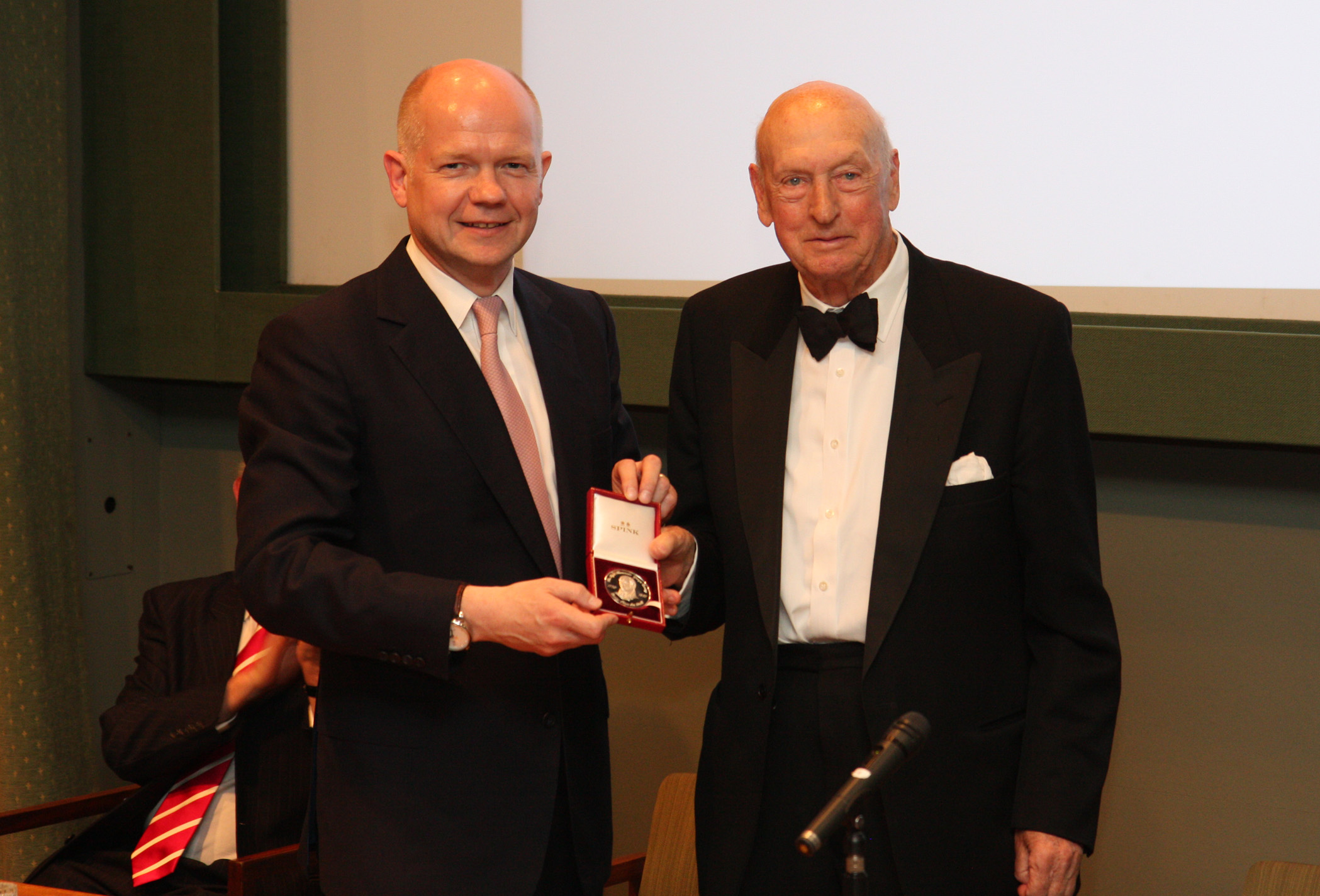
The 2nd Viscount (right), receiving the Canning Medal from William Hague in 2013

== Arms ==
Coat of arms of Viscount Montgomery of Alamein
Coronet A Coronet of a Viscount Crest Issuant from a Crescent Argent an Arm embowed in Armour the hand grasping a broken Tilting Spear in bend sinister the Head pendent proper Escutcheon Azure two Lions passant guardant between three Fleurs-de-lis two in chief and one in base and two Trefoils in fess all Or Supporters Dexter: a Knight in Chain Armour and Surcoat resting his exterior hand on his sword; Sinister: a Soldier in Battle Dress all proper Motto Gardez Bien (Guard well)
