= Sutton Coldfield (constituency) =

Parliamentary constituency in the United Kingdom, 1945 onwards

Coordinates: 52.56°N 1.81°W

- Borough constituency for the House of Commons
- Boundaries since 2010
- Boundary of Sutton Coldfield in West Midlands region
- County: West Midlands
- Electorate: 75,031 (December 2010)

Current constituency
- Created: 1945
- Member of Parliament: Sir Andrew Mitchell (Conservative)
- Seats: One
- Created from: North Warwickshire or the 'Tamworth' division of Warwickshire

Sutton Coldfield is a constituency (Note: A borough constituency (for the purposes of election expenses and type of returning officer)) represented in the House of Commons of the UK Parliament since 2001 by Andrew Mitchell, a Conservative. (Note: As with all constituencies, the constituency elects one Member of Parliament (MP) by the first past the post system of election at least every five years.)

== Constituency profile ==
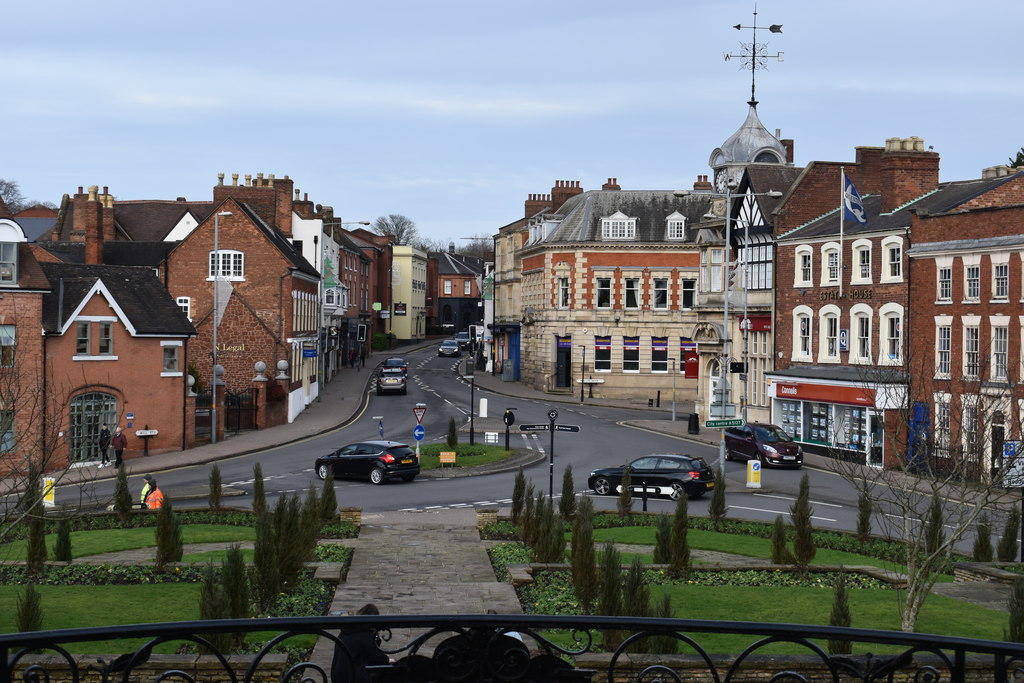
High Street, Sutton Coldfield

Sutton Coldfield is a constituency in the West Midlands county of England, covering the town of the same name. The town falls within the city boundaries of Birmingham and is located around 6 miles (9.7 km) north-east of the city centre.

Sutton Coldfield is a historic, suburban town that forms part of the West Midlands conurbation. Unlike the rest of this area, Sutton Coldfield does not have a history of coal mining or heavy industry and instead grew as a wealthy residential area for industrialists and middle-class workers. The town remains highly-affluent today with low levels of deprivation. House prices across the constituency are generally higher than the UK average and considerably higher than the rest of the West Midlands region.

Sutton Coldfield has a large retired population and a low proportion of young adults. Residents have high levels of income and homeownership, and the child poverty rate is around half the overall UK figure. They are generally well-educated and a high proportion work in the health, transport and arts sectors. The percentage of residents claiming unemployment benefits is low. White people made up 81% of the population at the 2021 census. Asians, mostly of Indian origin, were the largest ethnic minority group at 11%.

At the local city council, all seats in this constituency are represented by Conservatives. An estimated 52% of voters in Sutton Coldfield supported leaving the European Union in the 2016 referendum, identical to the UK-wide figure.

== Boundaries ==
1945–1955: The Municipal Borough of Sutton Coldfield, and the Rural Districts of Meriden and Tamworth.

1955–1974: The Municipal Borough of Sutton Coldfield, and the County Borough of Birmingham ward of Erdington.

1974–1983: The Municipal Borough of Sutton Coldfield.

1983–2010: The City of Birmingham wards of Sutton Four Oaks, Sutton New Hall, and Sutton Vesey.

2010–2018: The City of Birmingham wards of Sutton Four Oaks, Sutton New Hall, Sutton Trinity, and Sutton Vesey.

2018–present: Following a local government boundary review, which did not effect the parliamentary boundaries, the contents of the constituency are as follows with effect from May 2018:

- The City of Birmingham wards of Sutton Four Oaks; Sutton Mere Green; Sutton Reddicap; Sutton Roughley; Sutton Trinity; Sutton Vesey; Sutton Walmley & Minworth; Sutton Wylde Green.

The 2023 Periodic Review of Westminster constituencies left the boundaries unchanged.

The constituency covers the northern part of the City of Birmingham. It corresponds to the former borough of Sutton Coldfield.

== History ==
This area contributed to the old seat of North Warwickshire or the 'Tamworth' division of Warwickshire, which remains in a much narrower form as the largely suburban town to the north has developed.

Political history

All MPs elected since the constituency's creation in 1945 have been Conservative. Sutton Coldfield is, on the length of party representation measure combined with numerical majority, among the safest seats in the country for the party; they have received a majority of votes in the seat and its predecessors since 1885. The Conservative party's vote share of 68.9% in the constituency in 1979 would not be matched for 38 years, when the Conservatives received a higher share in South Holland and the Deepings, where they received 69.9%. Their lowest majority prior to the 2024 Labour landslide election was achieved in 2001, which still stood at a healthy 10,000 and a 50.4% share of the vote, and enabled Andrew Mitchell to make his return to Parliament. At the 2024 general election, Mitchell retained his seat on a much reduced majority of 5.3% over Labour and a vote share of 38.3%, the first time in the seat's existence that the Conservative vote had fallen below 50%.

Prominent frontbench members

Geoffrey Lloyd (later created a life peer as Baron Geoffrey-Lloyd) was for four years the Minister of Fuel and Power then Minister of Education for two years mostly under the Third Churchill ministry then Macmillan Ministry.

Former Cabinet minister Sir Norman Fowler served the seat from 1974 until retiring as an MP in 2001. Departments he led during the Thatcher ministry were transport, social services and then employment. Now Lord Fowler, he was Lord Speaker from September 2016 until April 2021.

Sir Andrew Mitchell, MP here since 2001 and previously MP for Gedling from 1987 to 1997, was Secretary of State for International Development then briefly Conservative Chief Whip while in Coalition Government 2010-2015, until standing down after swearing at police while attempting to take his bicycle through the main gates of Downing Street in 2012.

== Members of Parliament ==
Election	Member	Party	Notes
1945	Sir John Mellor	Conservative	
1955	Geoffrey Lloyd	Conservative	Minister of Fuel and Power 1951–1955; Minister of Education 1957–1959
Feb 1974	Norman Fowler	Conservative	Minister of Transport 1979–1981; Secretary of State for Transport 1981; Secretary of State for Social Services 1981–1987; Secretary of State for Employment 1987–1990; Chairman of the Conservative Party 1992–1994
2001	Sir Andrew Mitchell	Conservative	Secretary of State for International Development 2010–2012; Parliamentary Secretary to the Treasury and Government Chief Whip 2012; Minister of State for Development and Africa 2022–2024

== Elections ==
=== Elections in the 2020s ===
General election 2024: Sutton Coldfield
Party	Candidate	Votes	%	±%
Conservative	Andrew Mitchell	18,502	38.3	−22.1
Labour	Rob Pocock	15,959	33.0	+9.4
Reform	Mark Hoath	8,213	17.0	New
Liberal Democrats	John Sweeney	2,587	5.4	−6.8
Green	Ben Auton	2,419	5.0	+1.1
Workers Party	Wajad Burkey	653	1.4	New
Majority		2,543	5.3	−31.5
Turnout		48,333	65.2	−4.0
Registered electors		74,080		
Conservative hold		Swing	−15.8	

=== Elections in the 2010s ===
General election 2019: Sutton Coldfield
Party	Candidate	Votes	%	±%
Conservative	Andrew Mitchell	31,604	60.4	−0.6
Labour	David Knowles	12,332	23.6	−8.3
Liberal Democrats	Jenny Wilkinson	6,358	12.2	+7.8
Green	Ben Auton	2,031	3.9	+2.1
Majority		19,272	36.8	+7.7
Turnout		52,325	69.2	−0.7
Registered electors		75,638		
Conservative hold		Swing	+3.9	

General election 2017: Sutton Coldfield
Party	Candidate	Votes	%	±%
Conservative	Andrew Mitchell	32,224	61.0	+6.4
Labour	Robert Pocock	16,885	31.9	+9.6
Liberal Democrats	Jenny Wilkinson	2,302	4.4	−0.8
Green	David Ratcliff	965	1.8	−1.0
Independent	Hannah Sophia	482	0.9	New
Majority		15,339	29.1	−3.2
Turnout		52,858	69.9	+2.0
Conservative hold		Swing	−1.7	

General election 2015: Sutton Coldfield
Party	Candidate	Votes	%	±%
Conservative	Andrew Mitchell	27,782	54.6	+0.6
Labour	Robert Pocock	11,365	22.3	+1.9
UKIP	Marcus Brown	7,489	14.7	+11.6
Liberal Democrats	Richard Brighton-Knight	2,627	5.2	−12.8
Green	David Ratcliff	1,426	2.8	+1.7
Ubuntu	Mark Sleigh	165	0.3	New
Majority		16,417	32.3	−1.3
Turnout		50,854	67.9	0.0
Conservative hold		Swing	−0.7	

General election 2010: Sutton Coldfield
Party	Candidate	Votes	%	±%
Conservative	Andrew Mitchell	27,303	54.0	+1.4
Labour	Robert Pocock	10,298	20.4	−5.6
Liberal Democrats	Richard Brighton	9,117	18.0	+1.4
BNP	Robert Grierson	1,749	3.5	New
UKIP	Edward Siddall-Jones	1,587	3.1	−1.8
Green	Joe Rooney	535	1.1	New
Majority		17,005	33.6	+7.1
Turnout		50,589	67.9	+5.2
Conservative hold		Swing	+3.5	

=== Elections in the 2000s ===
General election 2005: Sutton Coldfield
Party	Candidate	Votes	%	±%
Conservative	Andrew Mitchell	24,308	52.5	+2.1
Labour	Robert Pocock	12,025	26.0	−1.2
Liberal Democrats	Craig Drury	7,710	16.6	−2.4
UKIP	Stephen Shorrock	2,275	4.9	+2.2
Majority		12,283	26.5	+3.3
Turnout		46,318	63.5	+3.0
Conservative hold		Swing	+1.7	

General election 2001: Sutton Coldfield
Party	Candidate	Votes	%	±%
Conservative	Andrew Mitchell	21,909	50.4	−1.8
Labour	Robert Pocock	11,805	27.2	+3.4
Liberal Democrats	Martin Turner	8,268	19.0	−0.4
UKIP	Mike Nattrass	1,186	2.7	New
Independent	Ian Robinson	284	0.7	New
Majority		10,104	23.2	−5.2
Turnout		43,452	60.5	−12.4
Conservative hold		Swing		

=== Elections in the 1990s ===
General election 1997: Sutton Coldfield
Party	Candidate	Votes	%	±%
Conservative	Norman Fowler	27,373	52.2	−13.0
Labour	Alan York	12,488	23.8	+8.8
Liberal Democrats	James Whorwood	10,139	19.4	+0.1
Referendum	Douglas Hope	2,401	4.6	New
Majority		14,885	28.4	−17.5
Turnout		52,401	72.9	−6.6
Conservative hold		Swing	−10.9	

General election 1992: Sutton Coldfield
Party	Candidate	Votes	%	±%
Conservative	Norman Fowler	37,001	65.2	+1.2
Liberal Democrats	James Whorwood	10,965	19.3	−5.4
Labour	Jan Bott-Obi	8,490	15.0	+3.7
Natural Law	Huw Meads	324	0.6	New
Majority		26,036	45.9	+6.6
Turnout		56,780	79.5	+5.0
Conservative hold		Swing		

=== Elections in the 1980s ===
General election 1987: Sutton Coldfield
Party	Candidate	Votes	%	±%
Conservative	Norman Fowler	34,475	64.0	−1.4
Liberal	Timothy Bick	13,292	24.7	−1.6
Labour	Peter McLoughlin	6,104	11.3	+2.9
Majority		21,183	39.3	+0.2
Turnout		53,871	74.5	+2.7
Conservative hold		Swing	+0.1	

General election 1983: Sutton Coldfield
Party	Candidate	Votes	%	±%
Conservative	Norman Fowler	31,753	65.4	−3.5
Liberal	Aubrey Jones	12,769	26.3	+10.2
Labour	Christopher Gibbons	4,066	8.4	−4.8
Majority		18,984	39.1	−13.6
Turnout		48,588	71.8	−5.5
Conservative hold		Swing		

=== Elections in the 1970s ===
General election 1979: Sutton Coldfield
Party	Candidate	Votes	%	±%
Conservative	Norman Fowler	34,096	68.9	+11.8
Liberal	CEA Hooper	7,989	16.1	−11.4
Labour	J Partridge	6,511	13.2	−2.2
National Front	R Wallace	466	0.9	New
Ind. Conservative	GC Hammond	459	0.9	New
Majority		26,107	52.7	+23.1
Turnout		49,521	77.3	+2.8
Conservative hold		Swing	+11.6	

General election October 1974: Sutton Coldfield
Party	Candidate	Votes	%	±%
Conservative	Norman Fowler	25,729	57.1	−0.4
Liberal	A Watson	12,373	27.5	−2.8
Labour	G W Wells	6,955	15.4	+3.2
Majority		13,356	29.6	−0.2
Turnout		45,057	74.5	+7.8
Conservative hold		Swing	+1.2	

General election February 1974: Sutton Coldfield
Party	Candidate	Votes	%	±%
Conservative	Norman Fowler	28,355	57.5	+0.1
Liberal	A. Watson	14,929	30.3	+16.0
Labour	R.A. Little	6,028	12.2	−16.1
Majority		13,426	29.8	+0.7
Turnout		49,312	82.3	+13.2
Conservative hold		Swing	−8.0	

General election 1970: Sutton Coldfield
Party	Candidate	Votes	%	±%
Conservative	Geoffrey Lloyd	36,774	57.4	+4.9
Labour	Peter Tebbutt	18,134	28.3	+3.6
Liberal	Lionel King	9,163	14.3	−8.6
Majority		18,640	29.1	+1.3
Turnout		64,071	69.1	−7.2
Conservative hold		Swing	+0.7	

=== Elections in the 1960s ===
General election 1966: Sutton Coldfield
Party	Candidate	Votes	%	±%
Conservative	Geoffrey Lloyd	30,350	52.5	−7.4
Labour	Derek Finnigan	14,257	24.7	+5.0
Liberal	Michael H Whincup	13,237	22.9	−2.6
Majority		16,093	27.8	−1.6
Turnout		57,844	76.3	−2.0
Conservative hold		Swing		

General election 1964: Sutton Coldfield
Party	Candidate	Votes	%	±%
Conservative	Geoffrey Lloyd	31,772	57.9	−5.5
Liberal	Michael H Whincup	14,745	25.5	+11.0
Labour	Peter E Tombs	11,399	19.7	−2.1
Majority		17,027	29.4	−12.2
Turnout		57,916	78.3	
Conservative hold		Swing		

=== Elections in the 1950s ===
General election 1959: Sutton Coldfield
Party	Candidate	Votes	%	±%
Conservative	Geoffrey Lloyd	33,064	63.4	−6.5
Labour	Roy Hattersley	11,310	21.8	−8.3
Liberal	Kenneth John Hovers	7,543	14.5	New
Majority		21,754	41.6	+1.8
Turnout		51,917		
Conservative hold		Swing	+0.9	

General election 1955: Sutton Coldfield
Party	Candidate	Votes	%	±%
Conservative	Geoffrey Lloyd	31,552	69.9	+6.2
Labour	Christopher Norwood	13,565	30.1	−6.2
Majority		17,987	39.8	+12.4
Turnout		45,117	76.7	−4.9
Conservative hold		Swing	+6.2	

General election 1951: Sutton Coldfield
Party	Candidate	Votes	%	±%
Conservative	John Mellor	36,628	63.7	+0.9
Labour	David G Allen	20,893	36.3	−0.9
Majority		15,735	27.4	+1.8
Turnout		57,521	81.6	−1.6
Conservative hold		Swing	+0.9	

General election 1950: Sutton Coldfield
Party	Candidate	Votes	%	±%
Conservative	John Mellor	36,017	62.8	+4.6
Labour	A Wilson	21,364	37.2	−0.4
Majority		14,653	25.6	+5.0
Turnout		57,381	83.2	+8.7
Conservative hold		Swing	+2.5	

=== Elections in the 1940s ===
General election 1945: Sutton Coldfield
Party	Candidate	Votes	%	±%
Conservative	John Mellor	28,225	58.2	
Labour	Fred Mulley	18,261	37.6	
Common Wealth	J. Purser	2,043	4.2	
Majority		9,964	20.6	
Turnout		48,529	74.5	
Conservative win (new seat)				

== See also ==
- List of parliamentary constituencies in the West Midlands (county)
- List of parliamentary constituencies in West Midlands (region)
- Sutton Coldfield
