= Oaksey =

Village in Wiltshire

Coordinates: 51.642°N 2.014°W

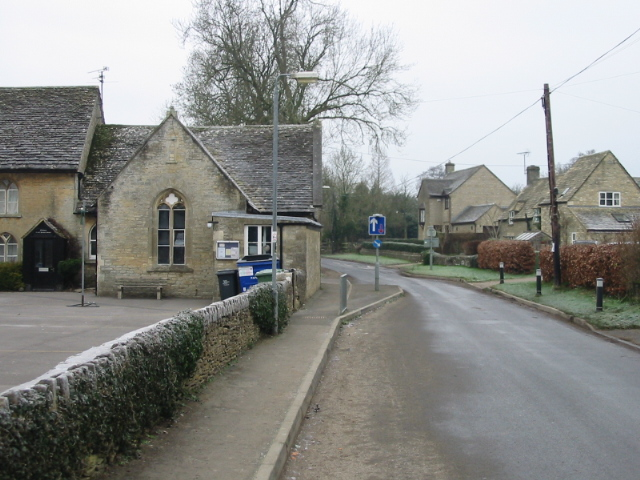
- The Street, Oaksey

- Location within Wiltshire
- Population: 530 (2011 census)
- OS grid reference: ST991937
- Civil parish: Oaksey
- Unitary authority: Wiltshire
- Ceremonial county: Wiltshire
- Region: South West
- Country: England
- Sovereign state: United Kingdom
- Post town: Malmesbury
- Postcode district: SN16
- Dialling code: 01666
- Police: Wiltshire
- Fire: Dorset and Wiltshire
- Ambulance: South Western
- UK Parliament: South Cotswolds
- Website: Village

Oaksey is a village and civil parish in Wiltshire, England, on the county boundary with Gloucestershire. The village is about 6 kilometres (3.7 mi) northeast of the market town of Malmesbury and a similar distance south south west of the Gloucestershire market town of Cirencester.

The Swill Brook forms part of the northern boundary of the parish.

== History ==
A settlement of 28 households at Wochesie was recorded in Domesday Book of 1086. There was a church at Oaksey in the 12th century, and in 1377 there were 86 poll tax payers.

Norwood Castle is an earthwork about 0.6 miles (0.97 km) north of the village at Dean Farm. It may be the remains of a Norman motte-and-bailey castle.

An early manor house, near the church, was in ruins by 1593. Oaksey Park House, a three-storey manor house, was built in the early 17th century, possibly for Sir Henry Poole. It was demolished in 1956.

== Parish church ==
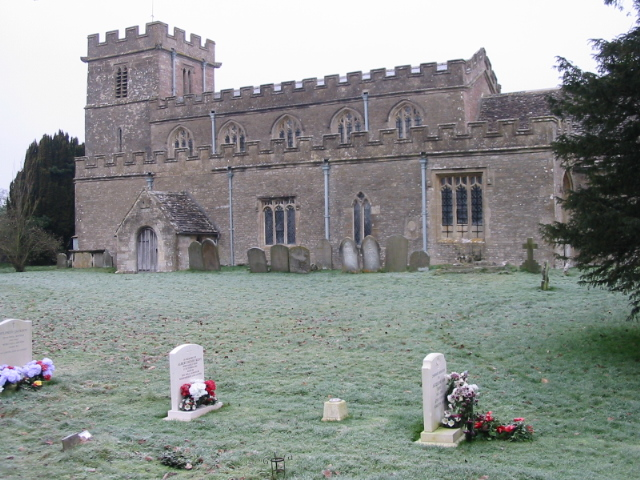
All Saints Church, Oaksey

The Grade I listed Church of England parish church of All Saints existed by the first half of the 12th century, and the nave walls of the current building may date from that time. In the 13th century the chancel was rebuilt and the three-bay south aisle was added, along with the south porch. The Decorated Gothic north porch was added in the first half of the 14th century. The five-bay Perpendicular Gothic clerestory was added in the first half of the 15th century. Further Perpendicular Gothic additions were made early in the 16th century: the south aisle was extended to form the south chapel, new windows were inserted in the north wall of the nave, the third stage of the tower was added.

A number of wall paintings were painted in the church either in the 15th century or early in the 16th century. Those that survive today include a painting of Saint Christopher with a mermaid, one of Christ surrounded by instruments of torture as a warning to Sabbath breakers and a badly damaged one of Saint Edmund.

In 1553 the tower had three bells, one of which had been cast at Worcester. In 1773 these were replaced by a ring of six new bells cast by Thomas Rudhall of Gloucester. In 1960 the ring was recast by John Taylor & Co of Loughborough.

== Amenities ==
Oaksey has a pub, the Wheatsheaf Inn. A corrugated iron village hall was built in Oaksey in the 1920s and a replacement was opened in 2000 by Prince Charles. Oaksey has primary school, a shop and Post Office, a cricket club, a football club which plays in the Cirencester and District League and a branch of the Women's Institute.

Oaksey Park Airfield (ICAO code EGTW) has two grass runways and is operated by Austen Aviation Services.

The Cotswold Water Park extends into the eastern part of the parish.

== Railway ==
The Golden Valley Line between Swindon and Cheltenham was built across the parish in 1841. Between 1929 and 1964 there was a small station (Oaksey Halt) adjacent to the bridge carrying the road to Somerford Keynes over the line. The nearest station still in operation is Kemble, about 3 miles (4.8 km) distance by road.

== Sources and further reading ==
- Baggs, A. P.; Freeman, Jane; Stevenson, Janet H. (1991). Crowley, D. A. (ed.). Victoria County History: A History of the County of Wiltshire: Volume 14: Malmesbury hundred. pp. 176–186.
- Pevsner, Nikolaus (1975). Cherry, Bridget (ed.). The Buildings of England: Wiltshire. Harmondsworth: Penguin Books. pp. 362–363. ISBN 0-14-0710-26-4.
