= Roger Cunliffe, 3rd Baron Cunliffe =

English architect

The Right Honourable The Lord Cunliffe

Member of the House of Lords
- Lord Temporal
- In office 24 November 1963 – 11 November 1999 as a hereditary peer
- Preceded by: The 2nd Baron Cunliffe
- Succeeded by: Seat abolished (Note: Pursuant to the House of Lords Act 1999.)

Personal details
- Born: Roger Cunliffe; 12 January 1932 (age 93)
- Political party: Crossbench
- Profession: Architect, project manager

Roger Cunliffe, 3rd Baron Cunliffe (born 12 January 1932), is a retired architect and consulting project manager. He specialised in project strategy, particularly for office buildings, museums and exhibition complexes, and for city planning, both in the UK and overseas. He designed various museums and office buildings, and was the job architect of the listed Commonwealth Institute in Holland Park, London. He has a small farm and woodlands in Suffolk.

The title of baron was granted to his grandfather, who was Governor of the Bank of England from 1914 to 1918, on 14 December 1914.

== Background ==
Roger Cunliffe was born at Furneux Pelham, Hertfordshire, on 12 January 1932, the eldest son of Rolf and Joan Cunliffe. He had two older sisters, Shirley (died 2007) and Corinna, and one younger brother Merlin. His father was a banker by trade and a wartime wing-commander in the RAF. He was also an avid collector of Chinese artworks and became the honorary keeper of the Far Eastern collections at the Fitzwilliam Museum.

Cunliffe (BA, MA) switched from engineering to architecture at Trinity College, Cambridge, after attending Eton College. He continued his education at the Architectural Association (AADipl) and the Open University. He moved his family to Chicago in the US in 1960 to work with the architect Harry Weese. They returned to England in 1963. He was made the Director of the Architectural Association 1969–1971. He worked for RMJM and was later director of Exhibition Consultants Ltd. Among his qualifications and professional associations were the following: RIBA, MCMI, MAPM; board member of Lancing College, Goldsmiths College and the College of Estate Management (Hon Fellow); Vice-chairman, British Consultants Bureau; Court of the Goldsmiths Company (Prime Warden 1997–1998); Trustee, William Blake Trust; Chairman of the Suffolk Craft Society; Hon DUniv University Campus Suffolk. Cunliffe was awarded an honorary doctorate from the University of Essex in 2008.

He married Clemency Ann Hoare in 1957 after meeting her while they were both working in Greece. They have three children. She died in 2025.

He has written for the national and professional press, and co-authored two books: Office Buildings with Leonard Manasseh in 1962 and Tomorrow's Office with Santa Raymond in 1995.

== Arms ==
Coat of arms of the Barons Cunliffe
| Crest Upon a rock Proper a greyhound sejant Sable collared Or. Escutcheon Per chevron Or and Sable three conies courant counterchanged. Supporters On either side a figure habited as a gate porter of the Bank of England supporting in the exterior hand his staff of office. Motto Fideliter |

== Notes ==
Peerage of the United Kingdom
| Preceded by Rolf Cunliffe | Baron Cunliffe; 1963–present Member of the House of Lords (1963–1999) | Incumbent; Heir apparent: Hon. Henry Cunliffe |
