= Baron Cullen of Ashbourne =

Barony in the Peerage of the United Kingdom

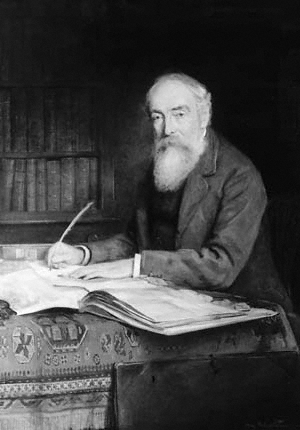
George Cokayne, ancestor of the Barons Cullen of Ashbourne.

Baron Cullen of Ashbourne, of Roehampton in the County of Surrey, is a title in the Peerage of the United Kingdom. It was created on 21 April 1920 for Sir Brien Cokayne, Governor of the Bank of England from 1918 to 1920. As of 2017 the title is held by his grandson, the fourth Baron, who succeeded his uncle in 2016.

The first Baron was the son of George Cokayne, Clarenceux King of Arms and editor of the first edition of The Complete Peerage, son of the Hon. Mary Anne Cokayne, granddaughter of Charles Cokayne, 5th Viscount Cullen.

== Barons Cullen of Ashbourne (1920) ==
- Brien Ibrican Cokayne, 1st Baron Cullen of Ashbourne (1864–1932)
- Charles Borlase Marsham Cokayne, 2nd Baron Cullen of Ashbourne (1912–2000)
- Edmund Willoughby Marsham Cokayne, 3rd Baron Cullen of Ashbourne (1916–2016)
- Michael John Cokayne, 4th Baron Cullen of Ashbourne (b. 1950)

There is no heir to the title.

== Arms ==
Coat of arms of the Barons Cullen of Ashbourne
Crest A cock's head erased Gules beaked crested and jelloped Sable. Escutcheon Argent three cocks Gules armed crested and jelloped Sable. Supporters Dexter a lion guardant party per fess Or and Argent sinister an ostrich Argent holding in its beak a horseshoe Proper each gorged with a collar pendant therefrom an escutcheon Argent charged with two bars Vert. Motto Virtus In Arduis (Valour In Difficulties)

== See also ==
- Viscount Cullen
