= Baron Kenswood =

Barony in the Peerage of the United Kingdom

Baron Kenswood, of St Marylebone in the County of London, is a title in the Peerage of the United Kingdom. It was created in 1951 for the professional violinist and welfare worker for the blind, Ernest Whitfield. As of 2017 the title is held by his grandson, the third Baron, who succeeded in 2016.

== Barons Kenswood (1951) ==
- Ernest Albert Whitfield, 1st Baron Kenswood (1887–1963)
- John Michael Howard Whitfield, 2nd Baron Kenswood (1930–2016)
- Michael Christopher Whitfield, 3rd Baron Kenswood (b. 1955)

The heir presumptive is the present holder's younger brother Hon. Anthony John Whitfield (b. 1957)
The heir presumptive's heir, and the next heir-in-line, is his son Peter Daniel Whitfield (b. 1981)

== Arms ==
Coat of arms of Baron Kenswood
Crest Between two wings Or a sprig of oak fructed Proper. Escutcheon Azure an argosy in full sail pennons flying Or a chief Argent thereon a lion passant Gules holding in the dexter forepaw a thunderbolt Proper. Supporters Dexter a figure representing St Cecilia habited Argent cloaked Azure with organ pipes Proper in her exterior hand sinister a figure representing St Gregory the Great habited Proper and cloaked Gules holding with his exterior arm a papal staff Or and holding in the hand a book Proper bound Sable. Motto Da Mihi Sapientiam
