= Alfred Clayton Cole =

Governor of the Bank of England
- In office 1911–1913
- Succeeded by: Walter Cunliffe

Personal details
- Born: Alfred Clayton Cole; 17 December 1854
- Died: 5 June 1920 (aged 65)
- Spouse: Lilian Seymour Chamberlain
- Education: Trinity College, Cambridge
- Profession: Merchant and banker

Alfred Clayton Cole (17 December 1854 – 5 June 1920) was a City of London merchant and director of the Bank of England, serving as Governor of the Bank of England from 1911 to 1913.

== Early life and background ==
The younger son of William Henry Cole, a banker and merchant trading with the Americas, with premises in Gracechurch Street, in the City of London, the young Cole was educated at Eton and Trinity College, Cambridge, then in 1880 entered his father's business in London, W. H. Cole & Son. In 1882 he was listed in the Webster's Court and Fashionable Register with an address at 64, Portland Place.

At Eton, Cole was a pupil of Oscar Browning and continued to correspond with him throughout his career. He had an older brother, William Utting Cole (1851–1892), who became an officer in the 3rd Dragoon Guards and died of cholera while serving in India. His widow married secondly Herbert Studd. He also had one sister, Annie Frances Cole, who in 1876 married Colonel Sir Howard Elphinstone VC, later promoted to general, and they had four daughters.

== Career ==
Cole became a director of the Bank of England in 1895. In 1901 he was listed as "Partner in firm of William Henry Cole and Co., merchants, Director of the Bank of England, and the London Assurance Corporation", with his address still in Gracechurch Street. He was also a Deputy Lieutenant for the City of London and a member of the Athenaeum Club and the St James's Club.

His father had died in 1889, and in 1908 he closed the family firm, on becoming its sole partner. He served for two years as Deputy Governor of the Bank of England from 1909 and was Governor from 1911 to 1913, when he was succeeded by Walter Cunliffe. In 1911 he wrote to his friend Browning "Of course it is pleasant to get to the top of the tree, though in my case it means more work and a great deal more responsibility. Still I have never been afraid of either one or the other."

In 1905 a remark by Cole, as a director of the Bank of England, was widely reported:

“It is no business of the Bank during any time of crisis to take care of the other banks... all that the Bank is called upon to do is to take care of itself.”

The then Governor of the bank, A. F. Wallace, made a strong reply to this in a speech at the Mansion House in June 1906. And in 1911, ironically, it fell upon Cole as Governor to announce a new scheme for closer co-operation between the Bank of England and the clearing banks.

He retired from the Bank of England in 1913. When he died in 1920, he was described in an obituary as "a man of great ability, of strong convictions, with fearless courage in expressing them".

== Private life ==
In 1907, at St George's, Hanover Square, Cole married Lilian Seymour Chamberlain (1864–1949), the Canadian-born widow of Joseph Chamberlain's brother Herbert. Four years later, at the same church, his niece Anne de Vere Cole married his wife's nephew Neville Chamberlain, later to become British prime minister.

In 1906, Cole's late brother's son, Horace de Vere Cole, inherited West Woodhay House in Berkshire, but lacked the income to live in the property, and in 1912 Cole bought it from him.

Cole died on 5 June 1920 at West Woodhay House, when his addresses were given as "of 64 Portland-place Middlesex, of West Woodhay-house Berkshire, and of Pulham St Mary Magdalen Norfolk". He was buried at St Mary Magdalen's church, Pulham Market, with the remains of his parents, William Henry and Jane Cole. Cole left an estate valued at £208,687, and probate was granted to Lilian Seymour Cole, widow, Jessie Degen Cole, spinster, Lt Col. Robert Singleton McClintock, and Charles Stephen Clayton.

Cole's widow died at home, 29 Eaton Square, Belgravia, on 21 December 1949, having been appointed an Officer of the Order of the British Empire. General Sir Ralph Eastwood and Brigadier A. A. M. Durand were the Executors of her estate.

== Notes ==
Government offices
Preceded by Reginald Eden Johnston	Governor of the Bank of England; 1911–1913	Succeeded by Walter Cunliffe
