= Walter Cunliffe, 1st Baron Cunliffe =

British banker

The Right Honourable The Lord Cunliffe GBE

Governor of the Bank of England
- In office 1913–1918
- Preceded by: Alfred Clayton Cole
- Succeeded by: Sir Brien Cokayne

Personal details
- Born: Walter Cunliffe; 3 December 1855 London, England
- Died: 6 January 1920 (aged 64) Headley Court, Surrey, England
- Spouse(s): Mary Agnes Henderson (m. 1890; died 1893) Edith Cunningham Boothby (m. 1896)
- Children: 6
- Profession: Banker

Walter Cunliffe, 1st Baron Cunliffe (3 December 1855 – 6 January 1920) was a British banker who established the merchant banking business of Cunliffe Brothers (after 1920, Goschens & Cunliffe) in London, and who was Governor of the Bank of England from 1913 to 1918, during the critical World War I era. He was created 1st Baron Cunliffe in 1914. He chaired the Cunliffe Committee which reported in 1918 with a plan for the monetary policy of the central bank and government after the war, which helped to shape fiscal policy.

== Early life and family ==
Cunliffe was born in London in 1855, the second eldest of four brothers and two sisters. His father, Roger Cunliffe, helped to finance and negotiate the development of the North Eastern Railway and became a merchant banker in the 1860s. He was educated at Harrow School and at Trinity College, Cambridge.

His brother, Alan Percy Cunliffe (1864–1942), was a landowner and racehorse-owner who married film actress Malvina Longfellow in 1940.

== Banker ==
He entered the banking industry in 1880. With two of his brothers, Arthur Robert and Leonard Daneham, he founded the merchant bank Cunliffe Brothers in 1890. On 1 January 1920, it merged with Frühling & Göschen to become Goschens & Cunliffe, which failed in December 1939.

Cunliffe became a director of the Bank of England in 1895 and its governor in 1913, working under Chancellors of the Exchequer David Lloyd George, Reginald McKenna, and Bonar Law. Shortly after the outbreak of the First World War, he calmed the money markets by preventing both the suspension of payments in gold and the removal of foreign securities. He was created Baron Cunliffe, of Headley in the County of Surrey, in December 1914. In April–May 1917, he was a member of the Balfour Mission to promote co-operation with the United States during the war.

Cunliffe was appointed a Knight Grand Cross of the Order of the British Empire in June 1917; he disagreed with Bonar Law later that year by feeling that the Treasury was taking too much of a role in maintaining the pound sterling's exchange rate. By November, Cunliffe had been forced to announce his imminent retirement, which occurred in March 1918.

At the Bank of England, Cunliffe personally wrote one of the first office dress codes for women and noted that he was "pained by some of the costumes he encountered" in the hallways. His policy was conservative: "During the summer, white blouses are allowed but they must be absolutely white without coloured pattern or design upon them".

He was appointed a director of North Eastern Railway in 1905 and of P&O in November 1919. He also received foreign decorations, including the Commander of the Légion d'honneur (France), the Grand Cordon of the Order of the Rising Sun (Japan), and the Order of St. Anna (first class, Russia).

Something of his style is conveyed by the following anecdote from Geoffrey Madan's Notebooks:

Lord Cunliffe, giving evidence before a Royal Commission, at the special request of the Chancellor of the Exchequer, would only say that the Bank of England reserves were "very, very considerable". When pressed to give even an approximate figure, he replied that he would be "very, very reluctant" to add to what he had said.

Throughout his tenure, as both a Director and a Governor of the Bank of England, he had a reputation not just for abrasiveness, but as a bully. Cunliffe's manner was so arrogant and abrasive that, whilst Governor of the Bank of England, he had a strained relationship with two of the three Chancellors of the Exchequer with whom he worked (Reginald McKenna and Bonar Law).

Cunliffe's arrogance did not only create tensions between the Bank of England and the Treasury, but also created animosity within the Bank of England itself. In the autumn of 1916, his colleagues within the Court of Directors were surreptitiously planning to force him out of the Bank's Governorship, but all the talk did not translate into effective action. The following November, however, the directors were organised effectively enough to ensure the election of Brien Cokayne as Governor and Montagu Norman as Deputy Governor. His dismissal "was a decision that Cunliffe found impossible to accept, mounting a vain campaign over the rest of 1917 to persuade bankers, press and senior figures at the Treasury to try to get Bonar Law to apply pressure on the Court to reverse its vote". This futile last stand achieved nothing beyond Cunliffe's own humiliation.

== Cunliffe Committee ==
As Governor of the Bank of England, Cunliffe chaired the Cunliffe Committee to recommend on the postwar transition of the British economy. The committee reported in 1918 that "it is imperative that after the war, the conditions necessary for the maintenance of an effective gold standard should be restored without delay". Prior to the committee's creation, Cunliffe had criticised the young John Maynard Keynes: "Mr. Keynes, in commercial circles, is not considered to have any knowledge or experience in practical exchange or business problems".

== Personal life ==
In 1880, he was given the original farmhouse estate of Headley Court, formerly the main manor of the village, and its remaining 300 acres (1.2 km^{2}), by his father, on the condition that he would make a career in banking, rather than become a farmer. He redeveloped it in 1898. The family fortune had been made by his grandfather, James Cunliffe, with his development of the North Eastern Railway (UK). He had the new house built in 1898 by Edward Prioleau Warren. He employed Lawrence Turner for the ceilings and plasterwork.

Cunliffe married, firstly, Mary Agnes (died 1893) in 1890, younger daughter of Robert Henderson. He married secondly to Edith Cunningham, fifth daughter of Colonel Robert Tod Boothby, in 1896. They had three sons and three daughters. His son, Geoffrey, married actress Barbara Waring.

Walter Cunliffe died at his home, Headley Court, 6 January 1920 (aged 64), from septicaemia. His son Rolf succeeded to his title.

== Arms ==
Coat of arms of the Barons Cunliffe
Crest Upon a rock Proper a greyhound sejant Sable collared Or. Escutcheon Per chevron Or and Sable three conies courant counterchanged. Supporters On either side a figure habited as a gate porter of the Bank of England supporting in the exterior hand his staff of office. Motto Fideliter

== Footnotes ==
Government offices
Preceded by Alfred Clayton Cole	Governor of the Bank of England; 1913–1918	Succeeded by Sir Brien Cokayne
Peerage of the United Kingdom
New creation	Baron Cunliffe; 1914–1920	Succeeded by Rolf Cunliffe
