= Brien Cokayne, 1st Baron Cullen of Ashbourne =

British businessman and banker

The Right Honourable The Lord Cullen of Ashbourne KBE

Governor of the Bank of England
- In office 1918–1920
- Preceded by: The Lord Cunliffe
- Succeeded by: Sir Montagu Collett Norman

Personal details
- Born: Brien Ibrican Adams; 12 July 1864
- Died: 3 November 1932 (aged 68)
- Spouse: Grace Margaret Marsham
- Children: 6
- Parent: George Edward Cokayne (father)
- Profession: Banker

Brien Ibrican Cokayne, 1st Baron Cullen of Ashbourne KBE (born Brien Ibrican Adams; 12 July 1864 – 3 November 1932) was a British businessman and banker.

Cokayne was the fourth son of George Edward Cokayne (né Adams until 15 August 1873), author of The Complete Peerage, the son of William Adams and his second wife, Mary Anne, granddaughter of Charles Cokayne, 5th Viscount Cullen. His mother was Mary Dorothea, daughter of George Henry Gibbs and sister of Hucks Gibbs, 1st Baron Aldenham. He was educated at Charterhouse School.

Cokayne was a partner in the firm of Anthony Gibbs and Sons, merchants and bankers, and also served as Deputy Governor from 1915 to 1918 and as Governor from 1918 to 1920 of the Bank of England. Appointed a Knight Commander of the Order of the British Empire in 1917, in 1920 he was raised to the peerage as Baron Cullen of Ashbourne, of Roehampton in the County of Surrey, a revival of the Cullen title held by his paternal ancestors. He was also appointed a Grand Cordon of the Order of the Sacred Treasure by Japan.

Lord Cullen of Ashbourne married Grace Margaret, daughter of Reverend the Hon. John Marsham, in 1904. They had three sons and three daughters. He died in November 1932, aged 68, and was succeeded in the barony by his eldest son Charles.

== Arms ==
Coat of arms of Brien Cokayne, 1st Baron Cullen of Ashbourne
| Crest A cock's head erased Gules beaked crested and jelloped Sable. Escutcheon Argent three cocks Gules armed crested and jelloped Sable. Supporters Dexter a lion guardant party per fess Or and Argent sinister an ostrich Argent holding in its beak a horseshoe Proper each gorged with a collar pendant therefrom an escutcheon Argent charged with two bars Vert. Motto Virtus in Arduis (Valour in Difficulties) |

== Footnotes ==
Government offices
| Preceded by The Lord Cunliffe | Governor of the Bank of England; 1918–1920 | Succeeded by Sir Montagu Norman |
Peerage of the United Kingdom
| New creation | Baron Cullen of Ashbourne; 1920–1932 | Succeeded by Charles Borlase Marsham Cokayne |
