= Ernest Greenhill, 1st Baron Greenhill =

Scottish politician

Ernest Greenhill, 1st Baron Greenhill OBE (23 April 1887 – 18 February 1967), was a Scottish politician.

Greenhill was the son of Maurice Greenhill. He was a member of the Glasgow Corporation. Greenhill was appointed an officer of the Order of the British Empire (OBE) in the 1947 New Year Honours. In 1950 he was raised to the peerage and created Baron Greenhill, of Townhead in the City of Glasgow on 8 July 1950. Lord Greenhill married Ida, daughter of Mark Goodman, in 1914. He died in February 1967, aged 79, and was succeeded in the barony by his elder son Stanley. Lady Greenhill died in 1985.

Peerage of the United Kingdom
New creation	Baron Greenhill; 1950–1967	Succeeded by Stanley Ernest Greenhill
