= Ernest Whitfield, 1st Baron Kenswood =

Ernest Albert Whitfield, 1st Baron Kenswood (15 September 1887 – 21 September 1963), was a British violinist and welfare worker for the blind.

Born in London, Whitfield was the younger son of John Henry Christopher Whitfield and his wife Louisa (née Farren). He was educated at Archbishop Tenison's Grammar School, University College School, and at Vienna and London universities. He at first worked in Vienna but in his early twenties his sight began to deteriorate. This forced him to prepare for a new vocation, which led him into a career as a violinist. He made his professional soloist debut in 1913, by then almost completely blind. He later came into contact with Sir Arthur Pearson, the founder of the charity organisation St Dunstan's, and joined the St Dunstan's Blind Musicians Concert Party.

Whitfield made his mark as an accomplished violinist in the early 1920s, but ill health later forced him to restrict his concert engagements. He then took up the study of economics, political science and philosophy, and obtained a BSc in 1926 and a PhD in 1928. The latter year he was elected to the Executive Council of the National Institute for the Blind. In 1935 he injured a hand and was forced to abandon his music career.

During the Second World War Whitfield worked for the blind in the United States and Canada, and after the war he was Governor of the BBC from 1946 to 1950. In 1951 he was raised to the peerage as Baron Kenswood, of St Marylebone in the County of London. Between 1951 and 1955 he served as President National Institute for the Blind.

Lord Kenswood married, firstly, Sophie Madeline, only child of Ernest Walter Howard. They had one son and a daughter. After her death in 1961, he married Catherine, widow of Charles Chilver-Stainer and daughter of Frank Luxton. Kenswood died in September 1963, aged 76, and was succeeded in the barony by his only son John.

== Arms ==
Coat of arms of Ernest Whitfield, 1st Baron Kenswood

Crest
Between two wings Or a sprig of oak fructed Proper.
Escutcheon
Azure an argosy in full sail pennons flying Or a chief Argent thereon a lion passant Gules holding in the dexter forepaw a thunderbolt Proper.
Supporters
Dexter a figure representing St Cecilia habited Argent cloaked Azure with organ pipes Proper in her exterior hand sinister a figure representing St Gregory the Great habited Proper and cloaked Gules holding with his exterior arm a papal staff Or and holding in the hand a book Proper bound Sable.
Motto
Da Mihi Sapientiam

== Notes ==
Peerage of the United Kingdom
New creation	Baron Kenswood; 1951–1963	Succeeded by John Michael Howard Whitfield
