= Baron Greenhill =

British hereditary peer

Baron Greenhill, of Townhead in the City of Glasgow, was a title in the Peerage of the United Kingdom. It was created on 8 July 1950 for Ernest Greenhill, a former member of the Glasgow Corporation. His elder son, the second Baron, was Professor of Community Medicine at the University of Alberta in Canada. The third Baron, who succeeded in 1989, once worked for the UK Ministry of Defence as a patent attorney.

== Barons Greenhill (1950) ==
- Ernest Greenhill, 1st Baron Greenhill, OBE (1887–1967)
- Stanley Ernest Greenhill, 2nd Baron Greenhill (1917–1989)
- Malcolm Greenhill, 3rd Baron Greenhill (1924–2020)

On the death of the 3rd Baron on 13 January 2020, the barony became extinct.

== See also ==
- Denis Greenhill, Baron Greenhill of Harrow
