= James Turner, 1st Baron Netherthorpe =

James Turner, 1st Baron Netherthorpe (6 January 1908 – 8 November 1980), was a British peer.

Turner was the son of Albert Edward Mann Turner of Anston, Yorkshire. He served as President of the National Farmers Union from 1945 to 1960 and was also President of the Royal Association of British Dairy Farmers and of the Royal Agricultural Society. He was knighted in 1949 and in 1959 he was raised to the peerage as Baron Netherthorpe, of Anston in the West Riding of the County of York.

Lord Netherthorpe died in November 1980, aged 72, and was succeeded in the barony by his eldest son James.

Coat of arms of James Turner, 1st Baron Netherthorpe
Crest A lion passant guardant Gules gorged with a collar Sable charged with bezants supporting with the dexter paw a cornucopia inverted Or the fruit Proper. Escutcheon Argent on a cross Gules between four garbs Vert five millrinds erect Or a chief of stone masonry Proper. Supporters Dexter a bull sinister a ram both Argent horned and unguled Or gorged with a collar Sable charged with bezants. Motto Juvat Ipse Labor (Work Itself Is Pleasing)

Peerage of the United Kingdom
New creation	Baron Netherthorpe; 1959–1980	Succeeded by James Andrew Turner
