= George Edward Cokayne =

British genealogist and author (1825–1911)

George Cokayne FSA
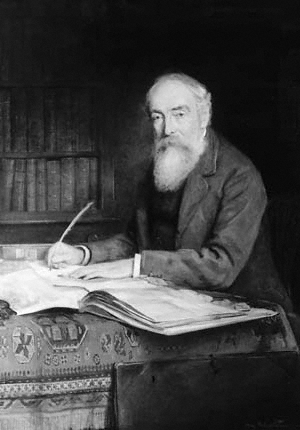
- Cokayne at work in 1900
- Born: George Edward Adams; 29 April 1825
- Died: 6 August 1911 (aged 86)
- Education: Exeter College, Oxford; Lincoln's Inn
- Occupations: Genealogist and herald
- Known for: The Complete Peerage
- Spouse: Mary Dorothea Gibbs (m. 1856)
- Children: 8, including Brien

George Edward Cokayne (29 April 1825 – 6 August 1911) was an English genealogist and long-serving herald at the College of Arms in London, who eventually rose to the rank of Clarenceux King of Arms. He wrote such authoritative and standard reference works as The Complete Peerage and The Complete Baronetage.

== Origins ==
Cokayne was born on 29 April 1825, with the surname Adams, being the son of William Adams by his wife the Hon. Mary Anne Cokayne, a daughter of Viscount Cullen. He was baptised George Edward Adams. On 15 August 1873, he changed his surname by Royal Licence to Cokayne (such changes were frequently made to meet the terms of bequests from childless relatives, often in the maternal line, who wished to see their name and arms continue).

== Career ==
=== Education ===
Cokayne matriculated from Exeter College, Oxford on 6 June 1844, and graduated BA in 1848 and MA in 1852. He was admitted a student of Lincoln's Inn on 16 January 1850, and was called to the bar on 30 April 1853.

=== College of Arms ===
Cokayne began his heraldic career at the College of Arms in London with an appointment in 1859 to the post of Rouge Dragon Pursuivant of Arms in Ordinary, and was promoted in 1870 to the office of Lancaster Herald of Arms in Ordinary. In 1882 he was promoted to Norroy King of Arms, which office he held until his appointment as Clarenceux King of Arms in 1894, which he held until his death in 1911.

=== The Complete Peerage ===
Cokayne wrote The Complete Peerage, the first edition of which was published between 1887 and 1898

== Marriage and progeny ==
On 2 December 1856, Cokayne married Mary Dorothea Gibbs, daughter of George Henry Gibbs by his wife Caroline Crawley. The couple had eight children, of whom two sons and two daughters survived their father.

One of Cokayne's sons, Brien, became Governor of the Bank of England from 1918 to 1920 and was ennobled in 1920 as Baron Cullen of Ashbourne.

== Death ==
Cokayne died at Roehampton on 6 August 1911, aged 86.

== Arms ==
Coat of arms of George Edward Cokayne
Adopted 1873 Crest A cock's head erased as in the arms. Escutcheon Argent, 3 cocks gules with legs, beaks, etc. sable. Motto Virtus in Arduis

Professional and academic associations
Preceded by Henry Hoyle Howorth	Vice-President of the Record Society of Lancashire and Cheshire; 1895–1911	Succeeded by Sir George John Armytage, Bt
