= Baron Netherthorpe =

Barony in the Peerage of the United Kingdom

Baron Netherthorpe, of Anston in the West Riding of the County of York, is a title in the Peerage of the United Kingdom. It was created in 1959 for James Turner, President of the National Farmers Union and of the Royal Agricultural Society. As of 2010 the title is held by his grandson, the third Baron, who succeeded his father in 1982.

== Barons Netherthorpe (1959) ==
- James Turner, 1st Baron Netherthorpe (1908–1980)
- James Andrew Turner, 2nd Baron Netherthorpe (1936–1982)
- James Frederick Turner, 3rd Baron Netherthorpe (b. 1964)

The heir apparent is the present holder's son Hon. Andrew James Edward Turner (b. 1993).

=== Line of Succession ===
- James Turner, 1st Baron Netherthorpe (1908–1980)
  - James Andrew Turner, 2nd Baron Netherthorpe (1936–1982)
    - James Frederick Turner, 3rd Baron Netherthorpe (born 1964)
      - (1) Hon. Andrew James Edward Turner (b. 1993)
      - (2) Hon. John Patrick William Turner (b. 2001)
    - (3) Hon. Patrick Andrew Turner (b. 1971)
  - Hon. Edward Neil Turner (c. 1941–2010)
    - (4) Major Charles James Turner (b. 1966)
      - (5) Edward Nicholas Turner (b. 1995)
      - (6) Henry James Turner (b. 1997)
      - (7) William Frederick Turner (b. 2001)
  - (8) Hon. Philip Noel Nigel Turner (b. 1949)

== Arms ==
Coat of arms of Baron Netherthorpe
| Crest A lion passant guardant Gules gorged with a collar Sable charged with bezants supporting with the dexter paw a cornucopia inverted Or the fruit Proper. Escutcheon Argent on a cross Gules between four garbs Vert five millrinds erect Or a chief of stone masonry Proper. Supporters Dexter a bull sinister a ram both Argent horned and unguled Or gorged with a collar Sable charged with bezants. Motto Juvat Ipse Labor (Work Itself Is Pleasing) |
