= Baron Cunliffe =

Barony in the Peerage of the United Kingdom

Baron Cunliffe, of Headley in the County of Surrey, is a title in the Peerage of the United Kingdom. It was created in 1914 for Walter Cunliffe, Governor of the Bank of England from 1913 to 1918. As of 2010 the title is held by his grandson, the third Baron, who succeeded his father in 1963.

== Barons Cunliffe (1914) ==
- Walter Cunliffe, 1st Baron Cunliffe (1855–1920)
- Rolf Cunliffe, 2nd Baron Cunliffe (1899–1963)
- Roger Cunliffe, 3rd Baron Cunliffe (b. 1932)

The heir apparent is the present holder's son the Hon. Henry Cunliffe (b. 1962)

== Arms ==
Coat of arms of the Barons Cunliffe
Crest Upon a rock Proper a greyhound sejant Sable collared Or. Escutcheon Per chevron Or and Sable three conies courant counterchanged. Supporters On either side a figure habited as a gate porter of the Bank of England supporting in the exterior hand his staff of office. Motto Fideliter
