= Peerage of the United Kingdom =

Ranks of nobility in the United Kingdom

The Peerage of the United Kingdom is one of the five peerages in the United Kingdom. It comprises most peerages created in the United Kingdom of Great Britain and Ireland after the Acts of Union in 1801, when it replaced the Peerage of Great Britain. New peers continued to be created in the Peerage of Ireland until 1898 (the last creation was the Barony of Curzon of Kedleston).

The House of Lords Act 1999 reformed the House of Lords. Until then, all peers of the United Kingdom were automatically members of the House of Lords. However, from that date, most of the hereditary peers ceased to be members, whereas the life peers retained their seats. All hereditary peers of the first creation (i.e. those for whom a peerage was originally created, as opposed to those who inherited a peerage), and all surviving hereditary peers who had served as Leader of the House of Lords, were offered a life peerage to allow them to continue to sit in the House, should they wish.

Peers in the Peerage of Scotland and Peerage of Ireland did not have an automatic seat in the House of Lords following the Acts of Union of 1707 and 1800, though the law permitted a limited number to be elected by their fellows to serve in the House of Lords as representative peers. (Note: The Peerage Act 1963 gave Scottish Peers an automatic right to sit in the Lords) Some peerages of the United Kingdom were created to get around this obstacle and allow certain Scottish and Irish peers to enjoy the automatic right to sit in the House of Lords. (Note: Following the establishment of the Irish Free State in December 1922, Irish peers ceased to elect representatives, although those already elected continued to have the right to serve for life; the last of the temporal peers, Francis Needham, 4th Earl of Kilmorey, by chance a peer from an Ulster family, died in 1961)

== Ranks ==
The ranks of the peerage are duke, marquess, earl, viscount, and baron.

The last non-royal dukedom was created in 1874, and the last marquessate was created in 1936. Creation of the remaining ranks, except baronies for life, mostly ceased once Harold Wilson's Labour government took office in 1964, and only thirteen (nine non-royal and four royal) people have been created hereditary peers since then. These were:

Grantee	Date of creation	Title(s)	Noted for
Reginald Manningham-Buller, The 1st Baron Dilhorne	7 December 1964	Viscount Dilhorne	Former Lord High Chancellor of Great Britain
Robert Grimston, Bt.	11 December 1964	Baron Grimston of Westbury	Former Member of Parliament
Frederick Erroll	19 December 1964 (extinct 2000)	Baron Erroll of Hale	Former Cabinet Minister
Robert Renwick, Bt.	23 December 1964	Baron Renwick	—
Michael Hughes-Young	31 December 1964	Baron St Helens	Former Member of Parliament
John Morrison	1 January 1965	Baron Margadale	Former Chairman of the 1922 Committee
William Whitelaw	16 June 1983 (extinct 1999)	Viscount Whitelaw	Former Home Secretary
George Thomas	11 July 1983 (extinct 1997)	Viscount Tonypandy	Former Speaker of the House of Commons
Harold Macmillan	24 February 1984	Earl of Stockton; Viscount Macmillan of Ovenden	Former Prime Minister
Andrew Mountbatten-Windsor; Formerly Prince Andrew	23 July 1986	Duke of York; Earl of Inverness; Baron Killyleagh	Second son of Queen Elizabeth II on his wedding day
Andrew Mountbatten-Windsor; Formerly Prince Andrew	In October 2025, amid controversy surrounding Andrew's ties to child sex offender Jeffrey Epstein, Buckingham Palace announced that Charles III had started a "formal process" to remove his brother's style, titles, and honours. Andrew's name was removed from the Roll of the Peerage the same day. This did not revoke his peerages, which can only be done by act of Parliament and not personally through the Sovereign's prerogatives, but means he is no longer entitled to any place in the orders of precedence derived from them and that he will cease to be addressed or referred to by any title derived from his peerages in public life, as well as official documents.		
Prince Edward	19 June 1999	Earl of Wessex; Viscount Severn	Third son of Queen Elizabeth II on his wedding day
Prince Edward	10 March 2019	Earl of Forfar	On his 55th birthday (used by the Earl and his wife as their primary title when they are in Scotland)
Prince Edward	On 10 March 2023 he was further created Duke of Edinburgh, the title held by his father during lifetime. This 2023 creation however is non-hereditary, i.e. 'for life' by his elder brother King Charles III.		
Prince William	29 April 2011	Duke of Cambridge; Earl of Strathearn; Baron Carrickfergus	First son of then-Charles, Prince of Wales on his wedding day
Prince Harry	18 May 2018	Duke of Sussex; Earl of Dumbarton; Baron Kilkeel	Second son of then-Charles, Prince of Wales on his wedding day

== Dukes in the Peerage of the United Kingdom ==
- Subsidiary title.
- Peerage of the United Kingdom created for a Peer of Scotland or Ireland to have an automatic seat in the House of Lords.

Shield	Title	Creation	Grantee	Reason	Monarch
	Duke of Wellington; Marquess of Douro	11 May 1814	(United Kingdom) Arthur Wellesley, Marquess of Wellington	Military Peerage–Army	The Prince Regent on behalf of King George III
	Duke of Sutherland	28 January 1833	(Kingdom of Great Britain) George Leveson-Gower, Marquess of Stafford	—	King William IV
	Duke of Westminster	27 February 1874	(United Kingdom) Hugh Grosvenor, Marquess of Westminster	—	Queen Victoria
	Duke of Gordon; Earl of Kinrara	13 January 1876	(Kingdom of England) Charles Gordon-Lennox, Duke of Richmond	Incumbent cabinet minister	Queen Victoria
	Duke of Albany; Earl of Clarence; Baron Arklow	24 May 1881	Prince Leopold	Currently suspended	Queen Victoria
	Duke of Argyll	7 April 1892	(Kingdom of Scotland) George Campbell, Duke of Argyll	Former cabinet minister and father-in-law of Princess Louise daughter of Queen Victoria	Queen Victoria
	Duke of Fife; Earl of Macduff	24 April 1900	(United Kingdom) Alexander Duff, Earl of Fife	Son-in-law of the Prince of Wales (later King Edward VII) (Note: Originally created for Alexander Duff, Earl of Fife on his wedding day to Princess Louise of Wales on 29 July 1889 (Note: Current Peerage with Special Remainder according to the link))	Queen Victoria
	Duke of Gloucester; Earl of Ulster; Baron Culloden	31 March 1928	Prince Henry	On his 28th birthday	King George V
	Duke of Kent; Earl of St Andrews; Baron Downpatrick	12 October 1934	Prince George	In anticipation of his forthcoming marriage to Princess Marina of Greece and Denmark	King George V
	Duke of York; Earl of Inverness; Baron Killyleagh	23 July 1986	Prince Andrew	On his wedding day to Sarah Ferguson. Currently suspended	Queen Elizabeth II
	Duke of Cambridge; Earl of Strathearn; Baron Carrickfergus	29 April 2011	Prince William of Wales	On his wedding day to Catherine Middleton	Queen Elizabeth II
	Duke of Sussex; Earl of Dumbarton; Baron Kilkeel	18 May 2018	Prince Harry of Wales	On his wedding day to Meghan Markle	Queen Elizabeth II
	Duke of Edinburgh	10 March 2023	Prince Edward	On his 59th birthday, (Title not hereditary, it will become extinct on his death)	King Charles III

== Marquesses (United Kingdom) ==
- Subsidiary title.
- Peerage of the United Kingdom created for a Peer of Scotland or Ireland to have an automatic seat in the House of Lords.

Shield	Title	Creation	Grantee	Reason	Monarch
	Marquess of Exeter	4 February 1801	(Kingdom of England) Henry Cecil, Earl of Exeter	—	King George III
	Marquess of Northampton; Earl Compton; Baron Wilmington	7 September 1812	(Kingdom of England) Charles Compton, Earl of Northampton	—	The Prince Regent on behalf of King George III
	Marquess Camden; Earl of Brecknock	7 September 1812	(Kingdom of Great Britain) John Pratt, Earl Camden	Former Viceroy of Ireland	The Prince Regent on behalf of King George III
	Marquess of Wellington	3 October 1812	Duke of Wellington (United Kingdom)		The Prince Regent on behalf of King George III
	Marquess of Wellington	3 October 1812	(United Kingdom) Arthur Wellesley, Earl of Wellington	Military Peerage–Army	The Prince Regent on behalf of King George III
	Marquess of Anglesey	4 July 1815	(Kingdom of Great Britain) Henry Paget, Earl of Uxbridge	Military Peerage–Army	The Prince Regent on behalf of King George III
	Marquess of Cholmondeley; Earl of Rocksavage	22 November 1815	(Kingdom of England) George Cholmondeley, Earl of Cholmondeley	Incumbent Lord Steward of the Household	The Prince Regent on behalf of King George III
	Marquess of Ailesbury; Earl Bruce; Viscount Savernake	17 July 1821	(Kingdom of Great Britain) Charles Brudenell-Bruce, Earl of Ailesbury	—	King George IV
	Marquess of Bristol; Earl Jermyn	30 June 1826	(Kingdom of Great Britain) Frederick Hervey, Earl of Bristol	—	King George IV
	Marquess of Ailsa	10 September 1831	(Kingdom of Scotland) Archibald Kennedy, Earl of Cassilis (Note: Scottish Representative Peer)	—	King William IV
	Marquess of Westminster	13 September 1831	Duke of Westminster (United Kingdom)		King William IV
	Marquess of Westminster	13 September 1831	(Kingdom of Great Britain) Robert Grosvenor, Earl Grosvenor	—	King William IV
	Marquess of Normanby	25 June 1838	(United Kingdom) Constantine Phipps, Earl of Mulgrave	Incumbent Viceroy of Ireland	Queen Victoria
	Marquess of Abergavenny; Earl of Lewes	14 January 1876	(Kingdom of Great Britain) William Nevill, Earl of Abergavenny	—	Queen Victoria
	Marquess of Zetland; Earl of Ronaldshay	22 August 1892	(United Kingdom) Lawrence Dundas, Earl of Zetland	Former Viceroy of Ireland	Queen Victoria
	Marquess of Linlithgow	27 October 1902	(Kingdom of Scotland) John Hope, Earl of Hopetoun	Incumbent Governor-General of Australia	King Edward VII
	Marquess of Aberdeen and Temair; Earl of Haddo	4 January 1916	(Kingdom of Scotland) John Hamilton-Gordon, Earl of Aberdeen	Former Governor General of Canada and former Viceroy of Ireland	King George V
	Marquess of Milford Haven; Earl of Medina; Viscount Alderney	7 November 1917	(Grand Duchy of Hesse) Prince Louis of Battenberg	He relinquished his German titles	King George V
	Marquess of Reading	7 May 1926	(United Kingdom) Rufus Isaacs, Earl of Reading	Former Viceroy of India and former Lord Chief Justice of England	King George V

== Earls (United Kingdom) ==
- Subsidiary title.
- Peerage of the United Kingdom created for a Peer of Scotland or Ireland to have an automatic seat in the House of Lords.

Shield	Title	Creation	Grantee	Reason	Monarch
	Earl of Rosslyn	21 April 1801	(Kingdom of Great Britain) Alexander Wedderburn, Baron Loughborough	Former Lord High Chancellor of Great Britain	King George III
	Earl of Craven; Viscount Uffington	18 June 1801	(Kingdom of England) William Craven, Baron Craven	—	King George III
	Earl of Onslow; Viscount Cranley	19 June 1801	(Kingdom of Great Britain) George Onslow, Baron Onslow	—	King George III
	Earl of Romney; Viscount Marsham	22 June 1801	(Kingdom of Great Britain) Charles Marsham, Baron Romney	—	King George III
	Earl of Chichester	23 June 1801	(Kingdom of Great Britain) Thomas Pelham, Baron Pelham of Stanmer	—	King George III
	Earl of Wilton; Viscount Grey de Wilton	26 June 1801	(Kingdom of Great Britain) Thomas Egerton, Baron Grey de Radcliffe		King George III
	Earl of Powis; Viscount Clive; Baron Herbert; Baron Powis	14 May 1804	(Kingdom of Great Britain) Edward Clive, Baron Clive	Incumbent Viceroy of Ireland	King George III
	Earl Nelson; Viscount Merton	20 November 1805	William Nelson	Brother of Horatio Nelson	King George III
	Earl Grey; Viscount Howick	11 April 1806	(United Kingdom) Charles Grey, Baron Grey	Military Peerage–Army	King George III
	Earl of Lonsdale	7 April 1807	(Kingdom of Great Britain) William Lowther, Viscount Lowther	—	King George III
	Earl of Harrowby; Viscount Sandon	19 July 1809	(Kingdom of Great Britain) Dudley Ryder, Baron Harrowby	Former Foreign Secretary	King George III
	Earl of Wellington	28 February 1812	Duke of Wellington (United Kingdom)	—	The Prince Regent on behalf of King George III
	Earl of Wellington	28 February 1812	(United Kingdom) Arthur Wellesley, Viscount Wellington	Military Peerage–Army	The Prince Regent on behalf of King George III
	Earl of Mulgrave; Viscount Normanby	7 September 1812	Marquess of Normanby (United Kingdom)	—	The Prince Regent on behalf of King George III
	Earl of Mulgrave; Viscount Normanby	7 September 1812	(Kingdom of Ireland) Henry Phipps, Baron Mulgrave	Former Foreign Secretary	The Prince Regent on behalf of King George III
	Earl of Harewood; Viscount Lascelles	7 September 1812	(Kingdom of Great Britain) Edward Lascelles, Baron Harewood	—	The Prince Regent on behalf of King George III
	Earl of Minto; Viscount Melgund	24 February 1813	(Kingdom of Great Britain) Gilbert Elliot-Murray-Kynynmound, Baron Minto	Incumbent Governor-General of the Presidency of Fort William	The Prince Regent on behalf of King George III
	Earl Cathcart	16 July 1814	(United Kingdom) William Cathcart, Viscount Cathcart	Military Peerage–Army	The Prince Regent on behalf of King George III
	Earl of Verulam; Viscount Grimston	24 November 1815	(Kingdom of Ireland) James Grimston, Viscount Grimston	—	The Prince Regent on behalf of King George III
	Earl of St Germans	28 November 1815	(Kingdom of Great Britain) John Eliot, Baron Eliot		The Prince Regent on behalf of King George III
	Earl of Morley; Viscount Boringdon	29 November 1815	(Kingdom of Great Britain) John Parker, Baron Boringdon	—	The Prince Regent on behalf of King George III
	Earl of Bradford; Viscount Newport	30 November 1815	(Kingdom of Great Britain) Orlando Bridgeman, Baron Bradford	—	The Prince Regent on behalf of King George III
	Earl of Eldon; Viscount Encombe	7 July 1821	(Kingdom of Great Britain) John Scott, Baron Eldon	Incumbent Lord High Chancellor of Great Britain	King George IV
	Earl Howe	16 July 1821	(United Kingdom) Richard Curzon-Howe, Viscount Curzon	—	King George IV
	Earl of Stradbroke; Viscount Dunwich	18 July 1821	(Kingdom of Great Britain) John Rous, Baron Rous	—	King George IV
	Earl Temple of Stowe	4 February 1822	(Kingdom of Great Britain) Richard Temple-Nugent-Brydges-Chandos-Grenville, Marquess of Buckingham		King George IV
	Earl Vane; Viscount Seaham	8 July 1823	(Kingdom of Ireland) Charles Vane, Marquess of Londonderry	Former Ambassador to Austria	King George IV
	Earl Cawdor; Viscount Emlyn	6 October 1827	(Kingdom of Great Britain) John Campbell, Baron Cawdor	—	King George IV
	Earl of Burlington; Baron Cavendish	15 September 1831	Held by the Duke of Devonshire (England) since 1858.	—	King William IV
	Earl of Burlington; Baron Cavendish	15 September 1831	Lord George Cavendish (Note: 3rd son of William Cavendish, 4th Duke of Devonshire)	—	King William IV
	Earl of Lichfield	15 September 1831	(United Kingdom) Thomas Anson, Viscount Anson	Incumbent Master of the Buckhounds	King William IV
	Earl of Durham; Viscount Lambton	23 March 1833	(United Kingdom) John Lambton, Baron Durham	Incumbent Ambassador to Russia	King William IV
	Earl Granville; Baron Leveson	10 May 1833	(United Kingdom) Granville Leveson-Gower, Viscount Granville	Incumbent Ambassador to France and former Ambassador to Russia	King William IV
	Earl of Effingham	27 January 1837	(Kingdom of England) Kenneth Howard, Baron Howard of Effingham	Military Peerage–Army	King William IV
	Earl of Ducie; Baron Moreton	28 January 1837	(Kingdom of Great Britain) Thomas Reynolds-Moreton, Baron Ducie	—	King William IV
	Earl of Yarborough; Baron Worsley	30 January 1837	(Kingdom of Great Britain) Charles Anderson-Pelham, Baron Yarborough	—	King William IV
	Earl Innes	11 August 1837	(Kingdom of Scotland) James Innes-Ker, Duke of Roxburghe	—	Queen Victoria
	Earl of Leicester; Viscount Coke	12 August 1837	Thomas Coke	—	Queen Victoria
	Earl of Zetland	2 July 1838	Marquess of Zetland (United Kingdom)	—	Queen Victoria
	Earl of Zetland	2 July 1838	(Kingdom of Great Britain) Lawrence Dundas, Baron Dundas	—	Queen Victoria
	Earl of Gainsborough; Viscount Campden; Baron Noel	16 August 1841	(United Kingdom) Charles Noel, Baron Barham	—	Queen Victoria
	Earl of Ellesmere; Viscount Brackley	6 July 1846	colspan=2 Held by the Duke of Sutherland (United Kingdom) since 1963.		Queen Victoria
	Earl of Ellesmere; Viscount Brackley	6 July 1846	Lord Francis Egerton (Note: 2nd son of George Leveson-Gower, 1st Duke of Sutherland)	Former cabinet minister	Queen Victoria
	Earl of Strafford; Viscount Enfield	18 September 1847	(United Kingdom) John Byng, Baron Strafford	Military Peerage–Army	Queen Victoria
	Earl of Cottenham; Viscount Crowhurst	11 June 1850	(United Kingdom) Charles Pepys, Baron Cottenham	Incumbent Lord High Chancellor of Great Britain	Queen Victoria
	Earl Cowley; Viscount Dangan	11 April 1857	(United Kingdom) Henry Wellesley, Baron Cowley	Incumbent Ambassador to France	Queen Victoria
	Earl of Winton	23 June 1859	(Kingdom of Scotland) Archibald Montgomerie, Earl of Eglinton	Incumbent Viceroy of Ireland	Queen Victoria
	Earl of Dudley; Viscount Ednam	17 February 1860	(Kingdom of England) William Ward, Baron Ward	—	Queen Victoria
	Earl Russell; Viscount Amberley	30 July 1861	Lord John Russell (Note: 3rd son of John Russell, 6th Duke of Bedford)	Former Prime Minister	Queen Victoria
	Earl of Cromartie; Viscount Tarbat; Baron Castlehaven; Baron MacLeod	21 October 1861	Anne Sutherland-Leveson-Gower, Duchess of Sutherland		Queen Victoria
	Earl of Kimberley	1 June 1866	(Kingdom of Great Britain) John Wodehouse, Baron Wodehouse	Incumbent Viceroy of Ireland	Queen Victoria
	Earl of Wharncliffe; Viscount Carlton	15 January 1876	(United Kingdom) Edward Montagu-Stuart-Wortley-Mackenzie, Baron Wharncliffe		Queen Victoria
	Earl Cairns; Viscount Garmoyle	27 September 1878	(United Kingdom) Hugh Cairns, Baron Cairns	Incumbent Lord High Chancellor of Great Britain	Queen Victoria
	Earl of Lytton; Viscount Knebworth	28 April 1880	(United Kingdom) Robert Bulwer-Lytton, Baron Lytton	Incumbent Viceroy of India	Queen Victoria
	Earl of Selborne; Viscount Wolmer	30 December 1882	(United Kingdom) Roundell Palmer, Baron Selborne	Incumbent Lord High Chancellor of Great Britain	Queen Victoria
	Earl of Iddesleigh; Viscount Saint Cyres	3 July 1885	Stafford Northcote, Bt.	Incumbent First Lord of the Treasury	Queen Victoria
	Earl of Cranbrook; Baron Medway	22 August 1892	(United Kingdom) Gathorne Gathorne-Hardy, Viscount Cranbrook	Former Home Secretary	Queen Victoria
	Earl of Cromer; Viscount Errington	6 August 1901	(United Kingdom) Evelyn Baring, Viscount Cromer	Incumbent Consul-General of Egypt	King Edward VII
	Earl of Plymouth; Viscount Windsor	18 December 1905	(Kingdom of England) Robert Windsor-Clive, Baron Windsor	Former cabinet minister	King Edward VII
	Earl of Liverpool; Viscount Hawkesbury	22 December 1905	(United Kingdom) Cecil Foljambe, Baron Hawkesbury	Incumbent Lord Steward of the Household	King Edward VII
	Earl of Midlothian; Viscount Mentmore; Baron Epsom	3 July 1911	(Kingdom of Scotland) Archibald Primrose, Earl of Rosebery	Former Prime Minister	King George V
	Earl St Aldwyn; Viscount Quenington	22 February 1915	(United Kingdom) Michael Hicks Beach, Viscount St Aldwyn	Former Chancellor of the Exchequer	King George V
	Earl of Reading; Viscount Erleigh	20 December 1917	Marquess of Reading (United Kingdom)	—	King George V
	Earl of Reading; Viscount Erleigh	20 December 1917	(United Kingdom) Rufus Isaacs, Viscount Reading	Incumbent Lord Chief Justice of England	King George V
	Earl Beatty; Viscount Borodale; Baron Beatty	27 September 1919	David Beatty	Military Peerage–Navy	King George V
	Earl Haig; Viscount Dawick; Baron Haig	29 September 1919	Douglas Haig	Military Peerage–Army	King George V
	Earl of Iveagh; Viscount Elveden	30 September 1919	(United Kingdom) Edward Guinness, Viscount Iveagh	—	King George V
	Earl of Balfour; Viscount Traprain	5 May 1922	Arthur Balfour	Former Prime Minister	King George V
	Earl of Oxford and Asquith; Viscount Asquith	9 February 1925	H. H. Asquith	Former Prime Minister	King George V
	Earl Jellicoe; Viscount Brocas	29 June 1925	(United Kingdom) John Jellicoe, Viscount Jellicoe	Former Governor-General of New Zealand	King George V
	Earl of Inchcape; Viscount Glenapp	20 June 1929	(United Kingdom) James Mackay, Viscount Inchcape	Chairman of Peninsular and Oriental Steam Navigation Company	King George V
	Earl Peel; Viscount Clanfield	10 July 1929	(United Kingdom) William Peel, Viscount Peel	Former cabinet minister	King George V
	Earl of Strathmore and Kinghorne	1 June 1937	(Kingdom of Scotland) Claude Bowes-Lyon, Earl of Strathmore and Kinghorne	Father-in-law of King George VI	King George VI
	Earl Baldwin of Bewdley; Viscount Corvedale	8 June 1937	Stanley Baldwin	Former Prime Minister	King George VI
	Earl of Halifax	11 July 1944	(United Kingdom) Edward Wood, Viscount Halifax	Former Viceroy of India	King George VI
	Earl of Gowrie; Viscount Ruthven of Canberra	8 January 1945	(United Kingdom) Alexander Hore-Ruthven, Baron Gowrie	Incumbent Governor-General of Australia	King George VI
	Earl Lloyd-George of Dwyfor; Viscount Gwynedd	12 February 1945	David Lloyd George	Former Prime Minister	King George VI
	Earl Mountbatten of Burma; Baron Romsey	18 October 1947	(United Kingdom) Louis Mountbatten, Viscount Mountbatten of Burma	Incumbent Governor-General of India	King George VI
	Earl Alexander of Tunis; Baron Rideau	11 March 1952	(United Kingdom) Harold Alexander, Viscount Alexander of Tunis	Former Governor General of Canada	Queen Elizabeth II
	Earl of Swinton; Baron Masham	5 May 1955	(United Kingdom) Philip Cunliffe-Lister, Viscount Swinton	Former cabinet minister	Queen Elizabeth II
	Earl Attlee; Viscount Prestwood	16 December 1955	Clement Attlee	Former Prime Minister	Queen Elizabeth II
	Earl of Woolton; Viscount Warbleton	9 December 1956	(United Kingdom) Frederick Marquis, Viscount Woolton	Former Chairman of the Conservative Party	Queen Elizabeth II
	Earl of Snowdon; Viscount Linley	6 October 1961	Antony Armstrong-Jones	Husband of Princess Margaret	Queen Elizabeth II
	Earl of Stockton; Viscount Macmillan of Ovenden	24 February 1984	Harold Macmillan	Former Prime Minister	Queen Elizabeth II
	Earl of Wessex; Viscount Severn	19 June 1999	Prince Edward	On his wedding day to Sophie Rhys-Jones	Queen Elizabeth II
	Earl of Forfar	10 March 2019	Prince Edward	On his 55th Birthday, (Title used in Scotland only)	Queen Elizabeth II

== Viscounts (United Kingdom) ==
- Subsidiary title.
- Peerage of the United Kingdom created for a Peer of Scotland or Ireland to have an automatic seat in the House of Lords.

Shield	Title	Creation	Grantee		Reason	Monarch
	Viscount St Vincent	27 April 1801	(Kingdom of Great Britain) John Jervis, Earl of St Vincent		Military Peerage–Navy	King George III
	Viscount Curzon	27 February 1802	Earl Howe (United Kingdom)			King George III
	Viscount Curzon	27 February 1802	(Kingdom of Great Britain) Assheton Curzon, Baron Curzon		—	King George III
	Viscount Melville; Baron Dunira	24 December 1802	Henry Dundas		Former Home Secretary	King George III
	Viscount Sidmouth	12 January 1805	Henry Addington		Former Prime Minister	King George III
	Viscount Anson; Baron Soberton	17 February 1806	Earl of Lichfield (United Kingdom)			King George III
	Viscount Anson; Baron Soberton	17 February 1806	Thomas Anson		Former Member of Parliament for the Whig Party	King George III
	Viscount Cathcart; Baron Greenock	9 November 1807	Earl Cathcart (United Kingdom)			King George III
	Viscount Cathcart; Baron Greenock	9 November 1807	(Kingdom of Scotland) William Cathcart, Lord Cathcart		Military Peerage Army	King George III
	Viscount Wellington; Baron Douro	4 September 1809	Duke of Wellington (United Kingdom)			King George III
	Viscount Wellington; Baron Douro	4 September 1809	Arthur Wellesley (Note: 4th son of Garret Wesley, 1st Earl of Mornington)		Military Peerage–Army	King George III
	Viscount Gordon	16 July 1814	Marquess of Aberdeen and Temair (United Kingdom)			The Prince Regent on behalf of King George III
	Viscount Gordon	16 July 1814	(Kingdom of Scotland) George Hamilton-Gordon, Earl of Aberdeen		Former Ambassador to Austria	The Prince Regent on behalf of King George III
	Viscount Granville	12 August 1815	Earl Granville (United Kingdom)			The Prince Regent on behalf of King George III
	Viscount Granville	12 August 1815	Lord Granville Leveson-Gower (Note: 2nd son of Granville Leveson-Gower, 1st Marquess of Stafford)		Former cabinet minister	The Prince Regent on behalf of King George III
	Viscount Exmouth	10 December 1816	(United Kingdom) Edward Pellew, Baron Exmouth		Military Peerage–Navy	The Prince Regent on behalf of King George III
	Viscount Hutchinson	14 July 1821	(Kingdom of Ireland) Richard Hely-Hutchinson, Earl of Donoughmore			King George IV
	Viscount Clancarty	8 December 1823	(Kingdom of Ireland) Richard Trench, Earl of Clancarty		Incumbent Ambassador to the Netherlands	King George IV
	Viscount Combermere	8 February 1827	(United Kingdom) Stapleton Cotton, Baron Combermere		Military Peerage–Army	King George IV
	Viscount Hill	27 September 1842	(United Kingdom) Rowland Hill, Baron Hill		Military Peerage–Army	Queen Victoria
	Viscount Hardinge	2 May 1846	Henry Hardinge		Incumbent Viceroy of India	Queen Victoria
	Viscount Halifax	21 February 1866	Earl of Halifax (United Kingdom)			Queen Victoria
	Viscount Halifax	21 February 1866	Charles Wood, Bt.		Former Chancellor of the Exchequer	Queen Victoria
	Viscount Bridport	6 July 1868	(Kingdom of Ireland) Alexander Hood, Baron Bridport		Military Peerage–Army	Queen Victoria
	Viscount Portman	28 March 1873	(United Kingdom) Edward Portman, Baron Portman		—	Queen Victoria
	Viscount Cranbrook	4 May 1878	Earl of Cranbrook (United Kingdom)			Queen Victoria
	Viscount Cranbrook	4 May 1878	Gathorne Hardy		Former Home Secretary	Queen Victoria
	Viscount Hampden	4 March 1884	Henry Brand (Note: 2nd son of Henry Trevor, 21st Baron Dacre)		Former Speaker of the House of Commons	Queen Victoria
	Viscount Hambleden	11 November 1891	Emily Smith		Widow of the First Lord of the Treasury William Henry Smith	Queen Victoria
	Viscount Peel	9 May 1895	Earl Peel (United Kingdom)			Queen Victoria
	Viscount Peel	9 May 1895	Arthur Peel		Former Speaker of the House of Commons	Queen Victoria
	Viscount Knutsford	3 August 1895	(United Kingdom) Henry Holland, Baron Knutsford		Former cabinet minister	Queen Victoria
	Viscount Esher	11 November 1897	(United Kingdom) William Brett, Baron Esher		Former Master of the Rolls	Queen Victoria
	Viscount Cromer	25 July 1899	Earl of Cromer (United Kingdom)			Queen Victoria
	Viscount Cromer	25 July 1899	(United Kingdom) Evelyn Baring, Baron Cromer		Incumbent Consul-General of Egypt	Queen Victoria
	Viscount Goschen	18 December 1900	George Goschen		Former Chancellor of the Exchequer	Queen Victoria
	Viscount Ridley; Baron Wensleydale	19 December 1900	Matthew White Ridley, Bt.		Former Home Secretary	Queen Victoria
	Viscount Colville of Culross	12 July 1902	(Kingdom of Scotland) Charles Colville, Lord Colville of Culross		Former Master of the Buckhounds	King Edward VII
	Viscount Selby	6 July 1905	William Gully		Former Speaker of the House of Commons	King Edward VII
	Viscount Iveagh	18 December 1905	Earl of Iveagh (United Kingdom)			King Edward VII
	Viscount Iveagh	18 December 1905	(United Kingdom) Edward Guinness, Baron Iveagh		—	King Edward VII
	Viscount Althorp	19 December 1905	Earl Spencer (Great Britain)			King Edward VII
	Viscount Althorp	19 December 1905	Charles Spencer (Note: 2nd son of Frederick Spencer, 4th Earl Spencer)		Incumbent Lord Chamberlain of the Household	King Edward VII
	Viscount St Aldwyn	6 January 1906	Earl St Aldwyn (United Kingdom)			King Edward VII
	Viscount St Aldwyn	6 January 1906	Michael Hicks Beach		Former Chancellor of the Exchequer	King Edward VII
	Viscount Knollys	4 July 1911	(United Kingdom) Francis Knollys, Baron Knollys		Incumbent Private Secretary to the Sovereign	King George V
	Viscount Allendale	5 July 1911	(United Kingdom) Wentworth Beaumont, Baron Allendale		—	King George V
	Viscount Chilston; Baron Douglas of Baads	6 July 1911	Aretas Akers-Douglas		Former Home Secretary	King George V
	Viscount Scarsdale	2 November 1911	(Kingdom of Ireland) George Curzon, Baron Curzon of Kedleston		Former Viceroy of India	King George V
	Viscount Mersey	22 June 1916	(United Kingdom) John Bigham, Baron Mersey		Judicial Peer	King George V
	Viscount Reading	26 June 1916	Marquess of Reading (United Kingdom)			King George V
	Viscount Reading	26 June 1916	(United Kingdom) Rufus Isaacs, Baron Reading		Incumbent Lord Chief Justice of England	King George V
	Viscount Cowdray	2 January 1917	(United Kingdom) Weetman Pearson, Baron Cowdray		Incumbent cabinet minister	King George V
	Viscount Devonport	23 June 1917	(United Kingdom) Hudson Kearley, Baron Devonport		Former cabinet minister	King George V
	Viscount Astor	23 June 1917	(United Kingdom) (United States) William Waldorf Astor, Baron Astor		The first man from the United States to be created a Hereditary Peer	King George V
	Viscount Jellicoe	15 January 1918	Earl Jellicoe (United Kingdom)			King George V
	Viscount Jellicoe	15 January 1918	John Jellicoe		Military Peerage–Navy	King George V
	Viscount Wimborne	15 June 1918	(United Kingdom) Ivor Guest, Baron Wimborne		Incumbent Viceroy of Ireland	King George V
	Viscount St Davids	17 June 1918	(United Kingdom) John Philipps, Baron St Davids		—	King George V
	Viscount Rothermere	17 May 1919	(United Kingdom) Harold Harmsworth, Baron Rothermere		Founder of the Daily Mail	King George V
	Viscount Allenby	7 October 1919	Edmund Allenby		Military Peerage–Army	King George V
	Viscount Chelmsford	3 June 1921	(United Kingdom) Frederic Thesiger, Baron Chelmsford		Incumbent Viceroy of India	King George V
	Viscount Long	4 June 1921	Walter Long		Former Leader of the Irish Unionist Alliance	King George V
	Viscount Ullswater	8 July 1921	James Lowther (Note: Grandson of William Lowther, 1st Earl of Lonsdale)		Former Speaker of the House of Commons	King George V
	Viscount Younger of Leckie	20 February 1923	George Younger, Bt.		Former Chairman of the Conservative Party	King George V
	Viscount Inchcape	21 January 1924	Earl of Inchcape (United Kingdom)			King George V
	Viscount Inchcape	21 January 1924	(United Kingdom) James Mackay, Baron Inchcape		Chairman of Peninsular and Oriental Steam Navigation Company	King George V
	Viscount Bearsted	16 June 1925	(United Kingdom) Marcus Samuel, Baron Bearsted		Founder of Royal Dutch Shell	King George V
	Viscount Bridgeman	18 June 1929	William Bridgeman (Note: Grandson of George Bridgeman, 2nd Earl of Bradford)		Former Home Secretary	King George V
	Viscount Hailsham	4 July 1929	(United Kingdom) Douglas Hogg, Baron Hailsham		Former Lord High Chancellor of Great Britain	King George V
	Viscount Brentford	5 July 1929	William Joynson-Hicks, Bt.		Former Home Secretary	King George V
	Viscount Buckmaster	24 February 1933	(United Kingdom) Stanley Buckmaster, Baron Buckmaster		Former Lord High Chancellor of Great Britain	King George V
	Viscount Bledisloe	24 June 1935	(United Kingdom) Charles Bathurst, Baron Bledisloe		Former Governor-General of New Zealand	King George V
	Viscount Swinton	29 November 1935	Earl of Swinton (United Kingdom)			King George V
	Viscount Swinton	29 November 1935	Philip Cunliffe-Lister		Incumbent cabinet minister	King George V
	Viscount Hanworth	17 January 1936	(United Kingdom) Ernest Pollock, Baron Hanworth		Incumbent Master of the Rolls	King George V
	Viscount Trenchard	31 January 1936	(United Kingdom) Hugh Trenchard, Baron Trenchard		Former Commissioner of the Metropolitan Police	King Edward VIII
	Viscount Samuel	8 June 1937	Herbert Samuel	Former Home Secretary	—	King George VI
	Viscount Runciman of Doxford	10 June 1937	Walter Runciman (Note: Eldest son of Walter Runciman, 1st Baron Runciman)		Former cabinet minister	King George VI
	Viscount Davidson	11 June 1937	J. C. C. Davidson		Former Chairman of the Conservative Party	King George VI
	Viscount Weir	25 June 1938	(United Kingdom) William Weir, Baron Weir		Former cabinet minister	King George VI
	Viscount Stonehaven	27 June 1938	Held by the Earl of Kintore (Scotland) since 1974.			King George VI
	Viscount Stonehaven	27 June 1938	(United Kingdom) John Baird, Baron Stonehaven		Former Governor-General of Australia	King George VI
	Viscount Caldecote	6 September 1939	Thomas Inskip		Incumbent Lord High Chancellor of Great Britain	King George VI
	Viscount Camrose	20 January 1941	(United Kingdom) William Berry, Baron Camrose		Co-owner of The Daily Telegraph	King George VI
	Viscount Stansgate	12 January 1942	William Wedgwood Benn		Former cabinet minister	King George VI
	Viscount Margesson	27 April 1942	David Margesson		Former cabinet minister	King George VI
	Viscount Daventry	3 May 1943	Muriel FitzRoy		Widow of the Speaker of the House of Commons Edward FitzRoy	King George VI
	Viscount Addison	2 July 1945	(United Kingdom) Christopher Addison, Baron Addison		Former cabinet minister	King George VI
	Viscount Kemsley	12 September 1945	(United Kingdom) Gomer Berry, Baron Kemsley		Co-owner of The Daily Telegraph	King George VI
	Viscount Marchwood	13 September 1945	(United Kingdom) George Penny, Baron Marchwood		—	King George VI
	Viscount Montgomery of Alamein	31 January 1946	Bernard Montgomery		Military Peerage–Army	King George VI
	Viscount Alexander of Tunis	1 March 1946	Earl Alexander of Tunis (United Kingdom)			King George VI
	Viscount Alexander of Tunis	1 March 1946	Harold Alexander (Note: 3rd son of James Alexander, 4th Earl of Caledon)		Military Peerage–Army	King George VI
	Viscount Mountbatten of Burma	23 August 1946	Earl Mountbatten of Burma (United Kingdom)			King George VI
	Viscount Mountbatten of Burma	23 August 1946	Lord Louis Mountbatten (Note: 2nd son of Louis Mountbatten, 1st Marquess of Milford Haven)		Military Peerage–Navy	King George VI
	Viscount Waverley	28 January 1952	John Anderson		Former Chancellor of the Exchequer	King George VI
	Viscount Thurso	10 April 1952	Archibald Sinclair, Bt.		Former Leader of the Liberal Party	Queen Elizabeth II
	Viscount Brookeborough	1 July 1952	Basil Brooke, Bt.		Incumbent Prime Minister of Northern Ireland	Queen Elizabeth II
	Viscount Norwich	5 July 1952	Duff Cooper		Former Ambassador to France	Queen Elizabeth II
	Viscount Woolton	2 July 1953	Earl of Woolton (United Kingdom)			Queen Elizabeth II
	Viscount Woolton	2 July 1953	(United Kingdom) Frederick Marquis, Baron Woolton		Incumbent cabinet minister	Queen Elizabeth II
	Viscount Leathers	18 January 1954	(United Kingdom) Frederick Leathers, Baron Leathers		Former cabinet minister	Queen Elizabeth II
	Viscount Soulbury	16 July 1954	(United Kingdom) Herwald Ramsbotham, Baron Soulbury		Incumbent Governor-General of Ceylon	Queen Elizabeth II
	Viscount Chandos	9 September 1954	Oliver Lyttelton (Note: Grandson of George Lyttelton, 4th Baron Lyttelton)		Former cabinet minister	Queen Elizabeth II
	Viscount De L'Isle	12 January 1956	(United Kingdom) William Sidney, Baron De L'Isle and Dudley		Former cabinet minister	Queen Elizabeth II
	Viscount Monckton of Brenchley	11 February 1957	Walter Monckton		Former cabinet minister	Queen Elizabeth II
	Viscount Tenby	12 February 1957	Gwilym Lloyd George (Note: 2nd son of David Lloyd George, 1st Earl Lloyd-George of Dwyfor)		Former Home Secretary	Queen Elizabeth II
	Viscount Mackintosh of Halifax	10 July 1957	(United Kingdom) Harold Mackintosh, Baron Mackintosh of Halifax		Owner of John Mackintosh & Sons Ltd	Queen Elizabeth II
	Viscount Dunrossil	12 November 1959	William Morrison		Former Speaker of the House of Commons	Queen Elizabeth II
	Viscount Stuart of Findhorn	20 November 1959	James Stuart (Note: 3rd son of Morton Gray Stuart, 17th Earl of Moray)		Former cabinet minister	Queen Elizabeth II
	Viscount Rochdale	20 January 1960	(United Kingdom) John Kemp, Baron Rochdale		—	Queen Elizabeth II
	Viscount Slim	15 July 1960	William Slim		Incumbent Governor-General of Australia	Queen Elizabeth II
	Viscount Head	2 August 1960	Antony Head		Incumbent High Commissioner to Nigeria	Queen Elizabeth II
	Viscount Boyd of Merton	8 September 1960	Alan Lennox-Boyd		Former cabinet minister	Queen Elizabeth II
	Viscount Mills	22 August 1962	(United Kingdom) Percy Mills, Baron Mills		Former cabinet minister	Queen Elizabeth II
	Viscount Blakenham	8 November 1963	John Hare (Note: 3rd son of Richard Hare, 4th Earl of Listowel)		Incumbent Chairman of the Conservative Party	Queen Elizabeth II
	Viscount Eccles	14 January 1964	(United Kingdom) David Eccles, Baron Eccles		Former cabinet minister	Queen Elizabeth II
	Viscount Dilhorne	7 December 1964	(United Kingdom) Reginald Manningham-Buller, Baron Dilhorne		Former Lord High Chancellor of Great Britain	Queen Elizabeth II

== Hereditary barons (United Kingdom) ==
- Subsidiary title.
- Peerage of the United Kingdom created for a Peer of Scotland or Ireland to have an automatic seat in the House of Lords.

Shield	Title	Creation	Grantee	Reason	Monarch
	Baron Loftus	19 January 1801	(Kingdom of Ireland) Charles Loftus, Marquess of Ely	—	King George III
	Baron Grey	23 June 1801	Earl Grey (United Kingdom)		King George III
	Baron Grey	23 June 1801	Charles Grey	—	King George III
	Baron Nelson	18 August 1801	Earl Nelson (United Kingdom)		King George III
	Baron Nelson	18 August 1801	(Kingdom of Great Britain) Horatio Nelson, Viscount Nelson	Military Peerage–Navy	King George III
	Baron Ellenborough	19 April 1802	Edward Law	Incumbent Lord Chief Justice of the King's Bench	King George III
	Baron Sandys	19 June 1802	Held by the Marquess of Downshire (Ireland) since 2013		King George III
	Baron Sandys	19 June 1802	Mary Hill, Marchioness of Downshire	Wife of The Marquess of Downshire	King George III
	Baron Barham	1 May 1805	Earl of Gainsborough (United Kingdom)		King George III
	Baron Barham	1 May 1805	Charles Middleton, Bt.	Military Peerage–Navy	King George III
	Baron Erskine	10 February 1806	Held by the Earl of Buchan (Scotland) since 1960		King George III
	Baron Erskine	10 February 1806	Thomas Erskine (Note: 3rd son of Henry Erskine, 10th Earl of Buchan)	Incumbent Lord High Chancellor of Great Britain	King George III
	Baron Monteagle	20 February 1806	(Kingdom of Ireland) John Browne, Marquess of Sligo	—	King George III
	Baron Ardrossan	21 February 1806	(Kingdom of Scotland) Hugh Montgomerie, Earl of Eglinton	—	King George III
	Baron Granard	24 February 1806	(Kingdom of Ireland) George Forbes, Earl of Granard	—	King George III
	Baron Ailsa	12 November 1806	Marquess of Ailsa (United Kingdom)		King George III
	Baron Ailsa	12 November 1806	(Kingdom of Scotland) Archibald Kennedy, Earl of Cassilis	—	King George III
	Baron Manners	20 April 1807	Thomas Manners-Sutton (Note: Grandson of John Manners, 3rd Duke of Rutland)	Incumbent Lord High Chancellor of Ireland	King George III
	Baron Hopetoun	3 February 1809	Marquess of Linlithgow (United Kingdom)		King George III
	Baron Hopetoun	3 February 1809	(Kingdom of Scotland) James Hope-Johnstone, Earl of Hopetoun (Note: Eldest son of John Hope, 2nd Earl of Hopetoun)		King George III
	Baron Niddry	17 May 1814	Marquess of Linlithgow (United Kingdom)	—	The Prince Regent on behalf of King George III
	Baron Niddry	17 May 1814	John Hope (Note: 2nd son of John Hope, 2nd Earl of Hopetoun)	Military Peerage–Army	The Prince Regent on behalf of King George III
	Baron Combermere	17 May 1814	Viscount Combermere (United Kingdom)		The Prince Regent on behalf of King George III
	Baron Combermere	17 May 1814	Stapleton Cotton, Bt.	Military Peerage–Army	The Prince Regent on behalf of King George III
	Baron Exmouth	1 June 1814	Viscount Exmouth (United Kingdom)		The Prince Regent on behalf of King George III
	Baron Exmouth	1 June 1814	Edward Pellew, Bt.	Military Peerage–Navy	The Prince Regent on behalf of King George III
	Baron Stewart	1 July 1814	Held by the Marquess of Londonderry (Ireland) since 1822		The Prince Regent on behalf of King George III
	Baron Stewart	1 July 1814	Charles Stewart (Note: 3rd son of Robert Stewart, 1st Marquess of Londonderry)	Incumbent Ambassador to Austria	The Prince Regent on behalf of King George III
	Baron Trench	4 August 1815	(Kingdom of Ireland) Richard Trench, Earl of Clancarty	Incumbent Ambassador to the Netherlands	The Prince Regent on behalf of King George III
	Baron Meldrum	11 August 1815	(Kingdom of Scotland) George Gordon, Earl of Aboyne	—	The Prince Regent on behalf of King George III
	Baron Grinstead	11 August 1815	(Kingdom of Ireland) John Cole, Earl of Enniskillen	—	The Prince Regent on behalf of King George III
	Baron Foxford	11 August 1815	(Kingdom of Ireland) Edmund Pery, Earl of Limerick	—	The Prince Regent on behalf of King George III
	Baron Churchill	11 August 1815	Lord Francis Spencer (Note: 3rd son of George Spencer, 4th Duke of Marlborough)	Former Member of Parliament for the Whig Party	The Prince Regent on behalf of King George III
	Baron Harris	11 August 1815	George Harris	Military Peerage–Army	The Prince Regent on behalf of King George III
	Baron Hill	16 January 1816	Viscount Hill (United Kingdom)		The Prince Regent on behalf of King George III
	Baron Hill	16 January 1816	(United Kingdom) Rowland Hill, Baron Hill	Military Peerage–Army	The Prince Regent on behalf of King George III
	Baron Ker of Kersehugh	17 July 1821	(Kingdom of Scotland) William Kerr, Marquess of Lothian	—	King George IV
	Baron Minster	17 July 1821	(Kingdom of Ireland) Henry Conyngham, Marquess Conyngham	Incumbent Lord Steward of the Household	King George IV
	Baron Wemyss	17 July 1821	(Kingdom of Scotland) Francis Douglas, Earl of March, also held with the Earl of Wemyss since 1826	—	King George IV
	Baron Silchester	17 July 1821	(Kingdom of Ireland) Thomas Pakenham, Earl of Longford	—	King George IV
	Baron Oriel	17 July 1821	Held by the Viscount Ferrard (Ireland) since 1826, and Viscount Massereene since 1843		King George IV
	Baron Oriel	17 July 1821	John Foster	Former Speaker of the House of Commons of Ireland	King George IV
	Baron Ravensworth	17 July 1821	Thomas Liddell, Bt.	Former Member of Parliament for the Tory Party	King George IV
	Baron Delamere	17 July 1821	Thomas Cholmondeley	Former Member of Parliament for the Tory Party	King George IV
	Baron Forester	17 July 1821	Cecil Weld-Forester	Former Member of Parliament for the Tory Party	King George IV
	Baron Rayleigh	18 July 1821	Lady Charlotte Strutt	Wife of Joseph Strutt	King George IV
	Baron Gifford	30 January 1824	Robert Gifford	Incumbent Lord Chief Justice of the Common Pleas	King George IV
	Baron Wigan	5 July 1826	(Kingdom of Scotland) James Lindsay, Earl of Balcarres, also held with the Earl of Crawford since 1848	—	King George IV
	Baron Ranfurly	6 July 1826	(Kingdom of Ireland) Thomas Knox, Viscount Northland	—	King George IV
	Baron Wharncliffe	12 July 1826	Earl of Wharncliffe (United Kingdom)		King George IV
	Baron Wharncliffe	12 July 1826	James Stuart-Wortley (Note: Grandson of John Stuart, 3rd Earl of Bute)	Former Member of Parliament for the Tory Party	King George IV
	Baron Feversham	14 July 1826	Charles Duncombe	Former Member of Parliament for the Tory Party	King George IV
	Baron Seaford	15 July 1826	Charles Ellis	Former Member of Parliament for the Tory Party	King George IV
	Baron Plunket	1 May 1827	William Plunket	Incumbent Lord Chief Justice of the Common Pleas for Ireland	King George IV
	Baron Cowley	21 January 1828	Earl Cowley (United Kingdom)		King George IV
	Baron Cowley	21 January 1828	Henry Wellesley (Note: 7th son of Garret Wesley, 1st Earl of Mornington)	Incumbent Ambassador to Austria	King George IV
	Baron Heytesbury	23 January 1828	William à Court, Bt.	Incumbent Ambassador to Russia	King George IV
	Baron Rosebery	26 January 1828	(Kingdom of Scotland) Archibald Primrose, Earl of Rosebery	—	King George IV
	Baron Clanwilliam	28 January 1828	(Kingdom of Ireland) Richard Meade, Earl of Clanwilliam	Former Minister of Prussia	King George IV
	Baron Durham	29 January 1828	Earl of Durham (United Kingdom)		King George IV
	Baron Durham	29 January 1828	John Lambton	Former Member of Parliament for the Whig Party	King George IV
	Baron Skelmersdale	30 January 1828	Edward Bootle-Wilbraham	Former Member of Parliament for the Tory Party	King George IV
	Baron Wynford	5 June 1829	William Best	Incumbent Lord Chief Justice of the Common Pleas	King George IV
	Baron Kilmarnock	17 June 1831	(Kingdom of Scotland) William Hay, Earl of Erroll	(Note: The Barony of Kilmarnock remained a subsidiary title of the Earldom of Erroll until the death in 1941 of the eighteenth Earl's great-great-grandson, the twenty-second Earl. The earldom, which could be passed on through female lines, was inherited by the late Earl's daughter and only child, the twenty-third Countess. The barony of Kilmarnock, which could only be passed on to male heirs, was inherited by the Earl's younger brother, the sixth Baron. He assumed the surname of Boyd in lieu of Hay the same year he succeeded to the title)	King William IV
	Baron Kenlis	10 September 1831	(Kingdom of Ireland) Thomas Taylour, Marquess of Headfort	—	King William IV
	Baron Chaworth	10 September 1831	(Kingdom of Ireland) John Brabazon, Earl of Meath	—	King William IV
	Baron Oakley	10 September 1831	Held by the Earl Cadogan (Great Britain) since 1832		King William IV
	Baron Oakley	10 September 1831	George Cadogan (Note: 8th son of Charles Cadogan, 1st Earl Cadogan)	Military Peerage–Navy	King William IV
	Baron Poltimore	10 September 1831	George Bampfylde, Bt.	—	King William IV
	Baron Mostyn	10 September 1831	Edward Lloyd Bt.	Former Member of Parliament for the Whig Party	King William IV
	Baron Templemore	10 September 1831	Held by the Marquess of Donegall (Ireland) since 1975		King William IV
	Baron Templemore	10 September 1831	Arthur Chichester (Note: Grandson of Arthur Chichester, 1st Marquess of Donegall)	Former Member of Parliament for the Whig Party	King William IV
	Baron de Saumarez	15 September 1831	James Saumarez, Bt.	Military Peerage–Navy	King William IV
	Baron Stanley of Bickerstaffe	22 December 1832	Held by the Earl of Derby (England) since 1834		King William IV
	Baron Stanley of Bickerstaffe	22 December 1832	Edward Smith-Stanley, Lord Stanley (Note: Eldest son of Edward Smith-Stanley, 12th Earl of Derby)	—	King William IV
	Baron Denman	28 March 1834	Thomas Denman	Incumbent Lord Chief Justice of the King's Bench	King William IV
	Baron Duncannon	19 July 1834	Held by the Earl of Bessborough (Ireland) since 1844		King William IV
	Baron Duncannon	19 July 1834	John Ponsonby, Viscount Duncannon (Note: Eldest son of Frederick Ponsonby, 3rd Earl of Bessborough)	Incumbent Home Secretary	King William IV
	Baron Abinger	12 January 1835	James Scarlett	Incumbent Lord Chief Baron of the Exchequer	King William IV
	Baron De L'Isle and Dudley	13 January 1835	Viscount De L'Isle (United Kingdom)		King William IV
	Baron De L'Isle and Dudley	13 January 1835	Philip Sidney, Bt.	Former Member of Parliament for the Tory Party	King William IV
	Baron Ashburton	10 April 1835	Alexander Baring	Former cabinet minister	King William IV
	Baron Hatherton	11 May 1835	Edward Littleton	Former cabinet minister	King William IV
	Baron Strafford	12 May 1835	Earl of Strafford (United Kingdom)		King William IV
	Baron Strafford	12 May 1835	John Byng (Note: Great-Grandson of George Byng, 1st Viscount Torrington)	Military Peerage–Army	King William IV
	Baron Worlingham	13 June 1835	(Kingdom of Ireland) Archibald Acheson, Earl of Gosford	—	King William IV
	Baron Cottenham	20 January 1836	Earl of Cottenham (United Kingdom)		King William IV
	Baron Cottenham	20 January 1836	Charles Pepys	Incumbent Lord High Chancellor of Great Britain	King William IV
	Baron Stratheden	22 January 1836	Lady Mary Campbell	Wife of John Campbell	King William IV
	Baron Portman	27 January 1837	Viscount Portman (United Kingdom)		King William IV
	Baron Portman	27 January 1837	Edward Portman	Former Member of Parliament for the Whig Party	King William IV
	Baron Lovat	28 January 1837	Thomas Fraser also held with the Lord of Lovat since 1854	—	King William IV
	Baron Rossmore	7 July 1838	(Kingdom of Ireland) Warner Westenra, Baron Rossmore	—	Queen Victoria
	Baron Carew	9 July 1838	(Kingdom of Ireland) Robert Carew, Baron Carew	—	Queen Victoria
	Baron de Mauley	10 July 1838	William Ponsonby (Note: 3rd son of Frederick Ponsonby, 3rd Earl of Bessborough)	Former Member of Parliament for the Whig Party	Queen Victoria
	Baron Wrottesley	11 July 1838	John Wrottesley	Former Member of Parliament for the Whig Party	Queen Victoria
	Baron Sudeley	12 July 1838	Charles Hanbury-Tracy	Former Member of Parliament for the Whig Party	Queen Victoria
	Baron Methuen	13 July 1838	Paul Methuen	Former Member of Parliament for the Whig Party	Queen Victoria
	Baron Stanley of Alderley	9 May 1839	John Stanley, Bt.	—	Queen Victoria
	Baron Leigh	11 May 1839	Chandos Leigh	—	Queen Victoria
	Baron Monteagle of Brandon	5 September 1839	Thomas Spring Rice	Former Chancellor of the Exchequer	Queen Victoria
	Baron Campbell	30 June 1841	Held by the Baron Stratheden (United Kingdom) since 1861		Queen Victoria
	Baron Campbell	30 June 1841	John Campbell	Incumbent Lord High Chancellor of Ireland	Queen Victoria
	Baron Oxenfoord	16 July 1841	(Kingdom of Scotland) John Dalrymple, Earl of Stair		Queen Victoria
	Baron Vivian	19 August 1841	Hussey Vivian, Bt.	Former Master-General of the Ordnance	Queen Victoria
	Baron Congleton	20 August 1841	Henry Parnell, Bt.	Former cabinet minister	Queen Victoria
	Baron Acheson	18 September 1847	Held by the Earl of Gosford (Ireland) since 1849		Queen Victoria
	Baron Acheson	18 September 1847	Archibald Acheson, Viscount Acheson (Note: Eldest son of Archibald Acheson, 2nd Earl of Gosford)	—	Queen Victoria
	Baron Eddisbury	12 May 1848	Held by the Baron Stanley of Alderley (United Kingdom) since 1850		Queen Victoria
	Baron Eddisbury	12 May 1848	Edward Stanley (Note: Eldest son of John Stanley, 1st Baron Stanley of Alderley)	Former cabinet minister	Queen Victoria
	Baron Elgin	13 November 1849	(Kingdom of Scotland) James Bruce, Earl of Elgin	—	Queen Victoria
	Baron Londesborough	4 March 1850	Lord Albert Denison (Note: 3rd son of Henry Conyngham, 1st Marquess Conyngham)	Former Member of Parliament for the Whig Party	Queen Victoria
	Baron de Freyne	5 April 1851	(United Kingdom) Arthur French, Baron de Freyne	Former Member of Parliament for the Whig Party	Queen Victoria
	Baron Raglan	20 October 1852	Lord FitzRoy Somerset (Note: 9th son of Henry Somerset, 5th Duke of Beaufort)	Incumbent Master-General of the Ordnance	Queen Victoria
	Baron Belper	29 August 1856	Edward Strutt	Former cabinet minister	Queen Victoria
	Baron Ebury	15 September 1857	Held by the Earl of Wilton (United Kingdom) since 1999		Queen Victoria
	Baron Ebury	15 September 1857	Lord Robert Grosvenor (Note: 3rd son of Robert Grosvenor, 1st Marquess of Westminster)	—	Queen Victoria
	Baron Chesham	15 January 1858	Charles Cavendish (Note: 4th son of George Cavendish, 1st Earl of Burlington)	Former Member of Parliament for the Whig Party	Queen Victoria
	Baron Chelmsford	1 March 1858	Viscount Chelmsford (United Kingdom)		Queen Victoria
	Baron Chelmsford	1 March 1858	Frederic Thesiger	Incumbent Lord High Chancellor of Great Britain	Queen Victoria
	Baron Churston	2 August 1858	John Yarde-Buller, Bt.	Former Member of Parliament for the Conservative Party	Queen Victoria
	Baron Leconfield	14 April 1859	George Wyndham	—	Queen Victoria
	Baron Lyveden	28 June 1859	Robert Vernon Smith	Former cabinet minister	Queen Victoria
	Baron Brougham and Vaux	22 March 1860	(United Kingdom) Henry Brougham, Baron Brougham and Vaux	Former Lord High Chancellor of Great Britain	Queen Victoria
	Baron Herbert of Lea	15 January 1861	Held by the Earl of Pembroke (England) since 1862		Queen Victoria
	Baron Herbert of Lea	15 January 1861	Sidney Herbert (Note: 4th son of George Herbert, 11th Earl of Pembroke)	Former cabinet minister	Queen Victoria
	Baron Westbury	27 June 1861	Richard Bethell	Incumbent Lord High Chancellor of Great Britain	Queen Victoria
	Baron Annaly	19 August 1863	Henry White	Former Member of Parliament for the Liberal Party	Queen Victoria
	Baron Buckhurst	27 April 1864	Held by the Earl De La Warr (Great Britain) since 1873		Queen Victoria
	Baron Buckhurst	27 April 1864	Elizabeth Sackville-West, Countess De La Warr	Wife of George Sackville-West, 5th Earl De La Warr	Queen Victoria
	Baron Northbrook	4 January 1866	Francis Baring, Bt.	Former Chancellor of the Exchequer	Queen Victoria
	Baron Monck	12 July 1866	(Kingdom of Ireland) Charles Monck, Viscount Monck	Incumbent Governor General of Canada	Queen Victoria
	Baron Hartismere	13 July 1866	(Kingdom of Ireland) John Henniker-Major, Baron Henniker	—	Queen Victoria
	Baron Lytton	14 July 1866	Earl of Lytton (United Kingdom)		Queen Victoria
	Baron Lytton	14 July 1866	Edward Bulwer-Lytton, Bt.	Former cabinet minister	Queen Victoria
	Baron Hylton	16 July 1866	William Jolliffe, Bt.	Former Member of Parliament for the Conservative Party	Queen Victoria
	Baron Penrhyn	3 August 1866	Edward Douglas-Pennant (Note: Grandson of James Douglas, 14th Earl of Morton)	Former Member of Parliament for the Conservative Party	Queen Victoria
	Baron Brancepeth	31 August 1866	(Kingdom of Ireland) Gustavus Hamilton-Russell, Viscount Boyne	—	Queen Victoria
	Baron Cairns	27 February 1867	Earl Cairns (United Kingdom)		Queen Victoria
	Baron Cairns	27 February 1867	Hugh Cairns	Former cabinet minister	Queen Victoria
	Baron O'Neill	18 April 1868	William O'Neill (Note: A descendant of Edward Chichester, 1st Viscount Chichester)	—	Queen Victoria
	Baron Napier of Magdala	17 July 1868	Robert Napier	Former Acting Viceroy of India	Queen Victoria
	Baron Gormanston	8 December 1868	(Kingdom of Ireland) Edward Preston, Viscount Gormanston	—	Queen Victoria
	Baron Dunning	29 June 1869	(Kingdom of Scotland) William Rollo, Lord Rollo	—	Queen Victoria
	Baron Balinhard	7 December 1869	Held by the Duke of Fife (United Kingdom) since 1992		Queen Victoria
	Baron Balinhard	7 December 1869	(Kingdom of Scotland) James Carnegie, Earl of Southesk	—	Queen Victoria
	Baron Hare	8 December 1869	(Kingdom of Ireland) William Hare, Earl of Listowel	—	Queen Victoria
	Baron Howard of Glossop	9 December 1869	Held by the Duke of Norfolk (England) since 1975		Queen Victoria
	Baron Howard of Glossop	9 December 1869	Lord Edward Fitzalan-Howard (Note: 2nd son of Henry Howard, 13th Duke of Norfolk)	Former Member of Parliament for the Liberal Party	Queen Victoria
	Baron Acton	11 May 1869	John Dalberg-Acton, Bt.	Former Member of Parliament for the Liberal Party	Queen Victoria
	Baron Wolverton	14 May 1869	George Glyn	Former Member of Parliament for the Liberal Party	Queen Victoria
	Baron Kildare	3 May 1870	Held by the Duke of Leinster (Ireland) since 1874		Queen Victoria
	Baron Kildare	3 May 1870	Charles FitzGerald, Marquess of Kildare (Note: Eldest son of Augustus FitzGerald, 3rd Duke of Leinster)	—	Queen Victoria
	Baron O'Hagan	14 June 1870	Thomas O'Hagan	Incumbent Lord High Chancellor of Ireland	Queen Victoria
	Baron Sandhurst	28 March 1871	William Mansfield	Military Peerage–Army	Queen Victoria
	Baron Ettrick	16 July 1872	(Kingdom of Scotland) Francis Napier, Lord Napier	Former Acting Viceroy of India	Queen Victoria
	Baron Selborne	23 October 1872	Earl of Selborne (United Kingdom)		Queen Victoria
	Baron Selborne	23 October 1872	Roundell Palmer	Incumbent Lord High Chancellor of Great Britain	Queen Victoria
	Baron Somerton	9 April 1873	(Kingdom of Ireland) James Agar, Earl of Normanton	—	Queen Victoria
	Baron Aberdare	23 August 1873	Henry Bruce	Former Home Secretary	Queen Victoria
	Baron Moncreiff	9 January 1874	James Moncreiff, Bt.	Incumbent Lord Justice Clerk	Queen Victoria
	Baron Coleridge	10 January 1874	John Coleridge	Incumbent Lord Chief Justice of the Common Pleas	Queen Victoria
	Baron Cottesloe	2 March 1874	Thomas Fremantle, Bt.	Former cabinet minister	Queen Victoria
	Baron Hampton	6 March 1874	John Pakington, Bt.	Former cabinet minister	Queen Victoria
	Baron Douglas of Douglas	11 June 1875	(Kingdom of Scotland) Cospatrick Douglas-Home, Earl of Home	—	Queen Victoria
	Baron Ramsay	12 June 1875	(Kingdom of Scotland) George Ramsay, Earl of Dalhousie	—	Queen Victoria
	Baron Fermanagh	13 January 1876	(Kingdom of Ireland) John Crichton, Earl Erne	—	Queen Victoria
	Baron Harlech	14 January 1876	John Ormsby-Gore	Former Member of Parliament for the Conservative Party	Queen Victoria
	Baron Tollemache	17 January 1876	John Tollemache	Former Member of Parliament for the Conservative Party	Queen Victoria
	Baron Gerard	18 January 1876	Robert Gerard, Bt.	—	Queen Victoria
	Baron Sackville	2 October 1876	Mortimer Sackville-West (Note: 4th son of George Sackville-West, 5th Earl De La Warr)		Queen Victoria
	Baron Norton	16 April 1878	Charles Adderley	Former cabinet minister	Queen Victoria
	Baron Wimborne	30 April 1880	Viscount Wimborne (United Kingdom)		Queen Victoria
	Baron Wimborne	30 April 1880	Ivor Guest, Bt.	—	Queen Victoria
	Baron Trevor	5 May 1880	Lord Edwin Hill-Trevor (Note: 3rd son of Arthur Hill, 3rd Marquess of Downshire)	Former Member of Parliament for the Conservative Party	Queen Victoria
	Baron Brabourne	26 May 1880	Held by the Earl Mountbatten of Burma (United Kingdom) since 2017		Queen Victoria
	Baron Brabourne	26 May 1880	Edward Knatchbull-Hugessen	Former Member of Parliament for the Liberal Party	Queen Victoria
	Baron Ampthill	11 March 1881	Lord Odo Russell (Note: Grandson of John Russell, 6th Duke of Bedford)	Incumbent Ambassador to Germany	Queen Victoria
	Baron Tweeddale	6 October 1881	(Kingdom of Scotland) William Hay, Marquess of Tweeddale	—	Queen Victoria
	Baron Derwent	10 October 1881	Harcourt Vanden-Bempde-Johnstone, Bt.	Former Member of Parliament for the Liberal Party	Queen Victoria
	Baron Hothfield	11 October 1881	Henry James Tufton, Bt.	—	Queen Victoria
	Baron Tennyson	24 January 1884	Alfred Tennyson	Incumbent Poet Laureate of the United Kingdom	Queen Victoria
	Baron Strathspey	17 June 1884	(Kingdom of Scotland) James Ogilvy-Grant, Earl of Seafield	(Note: The Barony was a subsidiary title of the earldom until the death of the ninth Earl's grandson, the eleventh Earl, in 1915. The earldom, which could be passed on to female heirs, was inherited by the Earl's daughter and only child, the twelfth Countess. The barony of Strathspey, which could only be inherited by males, were passed on to the Earl's brother, the fourth Baron)	Queen Victoria
	Baron Monk Bretton	4 November 1884	John George Dodson	Former cabinet minister	Queen Victoria
	Baron Northbourne	5 November 1884	Walter James, Bt.	—	Queen Victoria
	Baron Sudley	7 November 1884	(Kingdom of Ireland) Arthur Gore, Earl of Arran	—	Queen Victoria
	Baron Powerscourt	27 June 1885	(Kingdom of Ireland) Mervyn Wingfield, Viscount Powerscourt	—	Queen Victoria
	Baron Northington	28 June 1885	(Kingdom of Ireland) Anthony Henley, Baron Henley	—	Queen Victoria
	Baron Rothschild	29 June 1885	Nathan Rothschild, Bt.	Former Member of Parliament for the Liberal Party	Queen Victoria
	Baron Revelstoke	30 June 1885	Edward Baring	—	Queen Victoria
	Baron Monkswell	1 July 1885	Robert Collier	Former cabinet minister	Queen Victoria
	Baron Ashbourne	4 July 1885	Edward Gibson	Incumbent Lord High Chancellor of Ireland	Queen Victoria
	Baron St Oswald	6 July 1885	Rowland Winn	Former Member of Parliament for the Conservative Party	Queen Victoria
	Baron Esher	24 July 1885	Viscount Esher (United Kingdom)		Queen Victoria
	Baron Esher	24 July 1885	William Brett	Incumbent Master of the Rolls	Queen Victoria
	Baron Montagu of Beaulieu	29 December 1885	Lord Henry Douglas-Scott-Montagu (Note: 2nd son of Walter Montagu Douglas Scott, 5th Duke of Buccleuch)	Former Member of Parliament for the Conservative Party	Queen Victoria
	Baron Elphinstone	30 December 1885	(Kingdom of Scotland) William Elphinstone, Lord Elphinstone	—	Queen Victoria
	Baron Colville of Culross	31 December 1885	Viscount Colville of Culross (United Kingdom)		Queen Victoria
	Baron Colville of Culross	31 December 1885	(Kingdom of Scotland) Charles Colville, Lord Colville of Culross	—	Queen Victoria
	Baron Hindlip	16 February 1886	Henry Allsopp, Bt.	Former Member of Parliament for the Conservative Party	Queen Victoria
	Baron Grimthorpe	17 February 1886	Edmund Beckett, Bt.		Queen Victoria
	Baron Kensington	23 March 1886	(Kingdom of Ireland) William Edwardes, Baron Kensington	—	Queen Victoria
	Baron Hamilton of Dalzell	14 August 1886	John Hamilton	Former Member of Parliament for the Liberal Party	Queen Victoria
	Baron Stanley of Preston	27 August 1886	Held by the Earl of Derby (England) since 1893		Queen Victoria
	Baron Stanley of Preston	27 August 1886	Frederick Stanley (Note: 2nd son of Edward Smith-Stanley, 14th Earl of Derby)	Incumbent cabinet minister	Queen Victoria
	Baron Bowes	1 July 1887	(Kingdom of Scotland) Claude Bowes-Lyon, Earl of Strathmore and Kinghorne	—	Queen Victoria
	Baron St Levan	1 July 1887	John St Aubyn, Bt.	Former Member of Parliament for the Liberal Unionist Party	Queen Victoria
	Baron Basing	7 July 1887	George Sclater-Booth	Former cabinet minister	Queen Victoria
	Baron de Ramsey	8 July 1887	Edward Fellowes	Former Member of Parliament for the Conservative Party	Queen Victoria
	Baron Addington	22 July 1887	John Hubbard	Former Governor of the Bank of England	Queen Victoria
	Baron Knutsford	23 February 1888	Viscount Knutsford (United Kingdom)		Queen Victoria
	Baron Knutsford	23 February 1888	Henry Holland, Bt.	Former cabinet minister	Queen Victoria
	Baron Savile	27 October 1888	John Savile	Former Ambassador to Italy	Queen Victoria
	Baron Iveagh	21 February 1891	Earl of Iveagh (United Kingdom)		Queen Victoria
	Baron Iveagh	21 February 1891	Edward Guinness, Bt.	—	Queen Victoria
	Baron Cromer	20 June 1892	Earl of Cromer (United Kingdom)		Queen Victoria
	Baron Cromer	20 June 1892	Evelyn Baring	Incumbent Consul-General of Egypt	Queen Victoria
	Baron Ashcombe	22 August 1892	George Cubitt	Former Member of Parliament for the Conservative Party	Queen Victoria
	Baron Crawshaw	25 August 1892	Thomas Brooks, Bt.	—	Queen Victoria
	Baron Amherst of Hackney	26 August 1892	William Tyssen-Amherst	Former Member of Parliament for the Conservative Party	Queen Victoria
	Baron Newton	27 August 1892	William Legh	Former Member of Parliament for the Conservative Party	Queen Victoria
	Baron Dunleath	29 August 1892	John Mulholland	Former Member of Parliament for the Conservative Party	Queen Victoria
	Baron Swansea	9 June 1893	Henry Vivian, Bt.	Former Member of Parliament for the Liberal Party	Queen Victoria
	Baron Hawkesbury	24 June 1893	Earl of Liverpool (United Kingdom)		Queen Victoria
	Baron Hawkesbury	24 June 1893	Cecil Foljambe	Former Member of Parliament for the Liberal Party	Queen Victoria
	Baron Aldenham	31 January 1896	Hucks Gibbs	Former Governor of the Bank of England	Queen Victoria
	Baron Fairlie	23 July 1897	(Kingdom of Scotland) David Boyle, Earl of Glasgow	Former Governor of New Zealand	Queen Victoria
	Baron Dawnay	24 July 1897	(Kingdom of Ireland) Hugh Dawnay, Viscount Downe	—	Queen Victoria
	Baron HolmPatrick	27 July 1897	Ion Hamilton	Former Member of Parliament for the Conservative Party	Queen Victoria
	Baron Burton	29 November 1897	(United Kingdom) Michael Bass, Baron Burton	Former Member of Parliament for the Liberal Party	Queen Victoria
	Baron Glanusk	26 January 1899	Joseph Bailey, Bt.	Former Member of Parliament for the Conservative Party	Queen Victoria
	Baron Cranworth	28 January 1899	Robert Gurdon	Former Member of Parliament for the Liberal Unionist Party	Queen Victoria
	Baron Avebury	22 January 1900	John Lubbock, Bt.	Former Chairman of the London County Council	Queen Victoria
	Baron Killanin	15 June 1900	(United Kingdom) Michael Morris, Baron Morris	Former Lord Chief Justice of Ireland	Queen Victoria
	Baron Strathcona and Mount Royal	26 June 1900	(United Kingdom) (Canada) Donald Smith, Baron Strathcona and Mount Royal	Incumbent Canadian High Commissioner the United Kingdom	Queen Victoria
	Baron Kinross	15 July 1902	John Balfour	Incumbent Lord President of the Court of Session	King Edward VII
	Baron Shuttleworth	16 July 1902	Ughtred Kay-Shuttleworth, Bt.	Former cabinet minister	King Edward VII
	Baron Grenfell	19 July 1902	Francis Grenfell	Military Peerage–Army	King Edward VII
	Baron Knollys	21 July 1902	Viscount Knollys (United Kingdom)		King Edward VII
	Baron Knollys	21 July 1902	Francis Knollys	Incumbent Private Secretary to the Sovereign	King Edward VII
	Baron Redesdale	22 July 1902	Bertram Freeman-Mitford	Former Member of Parliament for the Conservative Party	King Edward VII
	Baron Burnham	31 July 1903	Edward Levy-Lawson, Bt.	Owner of The Daily Telegraph	King Edward VII
	Baron Biddulph	1 August 1903	Michael Biddulph	Former Member of Parliament for the Liberal Unionist Party	King Edward VII
	Baron Ritchie of Dundee	22 December 1905	Charles Ritchie	Former Chancellor of the Exchequer	King Edward VII
	Baron Hemphill	12 January 1906	Charles Hemphill	Former Member of Parliament for the Liberal Party	King Edward VII
	Baron Joicey	13 January 1906	James Joicey, Bt.	Former Member of Parliament for the Liberal Party	King Edward VII
	Baron Nunburnholme	16 January 1906	Charles Wilson	Former Member of Parliament for the Liberal Party	King Edward VII
	Baron Swaythling	18 July 1907	Samuel Montagu, Bt.	Former Member of Parliament for the Liberal Party	King Edward VII
	Baron Blyth	19 July 1907	James Blyth, Bt.	—	King Edward VII
	Baron Marchamley	3 July 1908	George Whiteley	Former Member of Parliament for the Liberal Party	King Edward VII
	Baron St Davids	6 July 1908	Viscount St Davids (United Kingdom)		King Edward VII
	Baron St Davids	6 July 1908	John Philipps, Bt.	Former Member of Parliament for the Liberal Party	King Edward VII
	Baron Gorell	16 February 1909	Gorell Barnes	Judicial Peer	King Edward VII
	Baron Fisher	7 December 1909	John Fisher	Military Peerage–Navy	King Edward VII
	Baron Kilbracken	8 December 1909	Arthur Godley	Former Civil Servant	King Edward VII
	Baron Ashby St Ledgers	15 March 1910	Viscount Wimborne (United Kingdom)		King Edward VII
	Baron Ashby St Ledgers	15 March 1910	Ivor Guest (Note: Eldest son of Ivor Guest, 1st Baron Wimborne)	Incumbent cabinet minister	King Edward VII
	Baron Mersey	16 March 1910	Viscount Mersey (United Kingdom)		King Edward VII
	Baron Mersey	16 March 1910	John Bigham	Judicial Peer	King Edward VII
	Baron Devonport	15 July 1910	Viscount Devonport (United Kingdom)		King George V
	Baron Devonport	15 July 1910	Hudson Kearley, Bt.	Former Member of Parliament for the Liberal Party	King George V
	Baron Cowdray	16 July 1910	Viscount Cowdray (United Kingdom)		King George V
	Baron Cowdray	16 July 1910	Weetman Pearson, Bt.	Former Member of Parliament for the Liberal Party	King George V
	Baron Hardinge of Penshurst	21 July 1910	Charles Hardinge (Note: 2nd son of Charles Hardinge, 2nd Viscount Hardinge)	Incumbent Viceroy of India	King George V
	Baron de Villiers	21 September 1910	(United Kingdom) (Union of South Africa) John de Villiers	Incumbent Chief Justice of South Africa	King George V
	Baron Glenconner	3 April 1911	Edward Tennant, Bt.	Former Member of Parliament for the Liberal Party	King George V
	Baron Mountgarret	20 June 1911	(Kingdom of Ireland) Henry Butler, Viscount Mountgarret	—	King George V
	Baron Aberconway	21 June 1911	Charles McLaren, Bt.	Former Member of Parliament for the Liberal Party	King George V
	Baron Merthyr	24 June 1911	William Lewis, Bt.	—	King George V
	Baron Inchcape	26 June 1911	Earl of Inchcape (United Kingdom)		King George V
	Baron Inchcape	26 June 1911	James Mackay	Chairman of Peninsular and Oriental Steam Navigation Company	King George V
	Baron Rowallan	27 June 1911	Archibald Corbett	Former Member of Parliament for the Liberal Party	King George V
	Baron Ashton of Hyde	28 June 1911	Thomas Ashton	Former Member of Parliament for the Liberal Party	King George V
	Baron Ravensdale	2 November 1911	(Kingdom of Ireland) George Curzon, Baron Curzon of Kedleston	Former Viceroy of India	King George V
	Baron Hollenden	9 February 1912	Samuel Morley	Former Governor of the Bank of England	King George V
	Baron Butler of Mount Juliet	8 July 1912	(Kingdom of Ireland) Charles Butler, Earl of Carrick	—	King George V
	Baron Rochdale	14 February 1913	Viscount Rochdale (United Kingdom)		King George V
	Baron Rochdale	14 February 1913	George Kemp	Former Member of Parliament for the Liberal Party	King George V
	Baron Reading	9 January 1914	Marquess of Reading (United Kingdom)		King George V
	Baron Reading	9 January 1914	Rufus Isaacs	Incumbent Lord Chief Justice of England	King George V
	Baron Parmoor	16 January 1914	Charles Cripps	Former Member of Parliament for the Conservative Party	King George V
	Baron Rothermere	17 January 1914	Viscount Rothermere (United Kingdom)		King George V
	Baron Rothermere	17 January 1914	Harold Harmsworth, Bt.	Founder of the Daily Mail	King George V
	Baron Cunliffe	14 December 1914	Walter Cunliffe	Incumbent Governor of the Bank of England	King George V
	Baron Wrenbury	12 April 1915	Henry Buckley	Judicial Peer	King George V
	Baron Buckmaster	14 June 1915	Viscount Buckmaster (United Kingdom)		King George V
	Baron Buckmaster	14 June 1915	Stanley Buckmaster	Incumbent Lord High Chancellor of Great Britain	King George V
	Baron Faringdon	24 January 1916	Alexander Henderson, Bt.	Former Member of Parliament for the Conservative Party	King George V
	Baron Shaughnessy	25 January 1916	(United States) (Canada) Thomas Shaughnessy	—	King George V
	Baron Astor	26 January 1916	Viscount Astor (United Kingdom)		King George V
	Baron Astor	26 January 1916	(United Kingdom) (United States) William Waldorf Astor	The first man from the United States to be created a Hereditary Peer	King George V
	Baron Rathcreedan	27 January 1916	Cecil Norton	Former Member of Parliament for the Liberal Party	King George V
	Baron Somerleyton	26 June 1916	Savile Crossley, Bt.	Former cabinet minister	King George V
	Baron Carnock	27 June 1916	Arthur Nicolson, Bt.	Former Ambassador to Russia	King George V
	Baron Beaverbrook	2 January 1917	(United Kingdom) (Canada) Max Aitken, Bt.	Owner of the Daily Express	King George V
	Baron Gainford	3 January 1917	Jack Pease	Former cabinet minister	King George V
	Baron Forteviot	4 January 1917	John Dewar, Bt.	Former Member of Parliament for the Liberal Party	King George V
	Baron Colwyn	22 June 1917	Frederick Smith, Bt.	—	King George V
	Baron Gisborough	23 June 1917	Richard Chaloner	Former Member of Parliament for the Conservative Party	King George V
	Baron Morris	15 January 1918	(United Kingdom) (Dominion of Newfoundland) Edward Morris	Former Prime Minister of Newfoundland	King George V
	Baron Cawley	16 January 1918	Frederick Cawley, Bt.	Former cabinet minister	King George V
	Baron Terrington	19 January 1918	James Woodhouse	Former Member of Parliament for the Liberal Party	King George V
	Baron Weir	26 June 1918	Viscount Weir (United Kingdom)		King George V
	Baron Weir	26 June 1918	William Weir	Incumbent cabinet minister	King George V
	Baron Glenarthur	27 June 1918	Matthew Arthur, Bt.	—	King George V
	Baron Phillimore	2 July 1918	Walter Phillimore, Bt.	Judicial Peer	King George V
	Baron Bledisloe	15 October 1918	Viscount Bledisloe (United Kingdom)		King George V
	Baron Bledisloe	15 October 1918	Charles Bathurst	Former Member of Parliament for the Conservative Party	King George V
	Baron Inverforth	5 February 1919	Andrew Weir	Incumbent cabinet minister	King George V
	Baron Sinha	14 February 1919	(United Kingdom) (British Raj) Satyendra Prasanna Sinha	The first man from India to be created a Hereditary Peer	King George V
	Baron Cochrane of Cults	16 May 1919	Thomas Cochrane (Note: 2nd son of Thomas Cochrane, 11th Earl of Dundonald)	Former Member of Parliament for the Liberal Unionist Party	King George V
	Baron Clwyd	19 May 1919	John Roberts, Bt.	Former Member of Parliament for the Liberal Party	King George V
	Baron Russell of Liverpool	9 October 1919	Edward Russell	Editor of the Liverpool Daily Post	King George V
	Baron Ruthven of Gowrie	28 October 1919	Held by the Earl of Gowrie (United Kingdom) since 1956		King George V
	Baron Ruthven of Gowrie	28 October 1919	(Kingdom of Scotland) Walter Hore-Ruthven, Lord Ruthven of Freeland	—	King George V
	Baron Swinfen	1 November 1919	Charles Swinfen Eady	Former Master of the Rolls	King George V
	Baron Meston	29 November 1919	James Meston	—	King George V
	Baron Cullen of Ashbourne	21 April 1920	Brien Cokayne	Former Governor of the Bank of England	King George V
	Baron Bearsted	15 June 1921	Viscount Bearsted (United Kingdom)		King George V
	Baron Bearsted	15 June 1921	Marcus Samuel, Bt.	Founder of Royal Dutch Shell	King George V
	Baron Trevethin	24 August 1921	Alfred Lawrence	Incumbent Lord Chief Justice of England	King George V
	Baron Glendyne	23 January 1922	Robert Nivison, Bt.	—	King George V
	Baron Manton	25 January 1922	Joseph Watson	—	King George V
	Baron Forres	19 June 1922	Archibald Williamson, Bt.	Former Member of Parliament for the Liberal Party	King George V
	Baron Vestey	20 June 1922	William Vestey, Bt.	Co-founder of Blue Star Line	King George V
	Baron Borwick	20 July 1922	Robert Borwick, Bt.	—	King George V
	Baron Maclay	21 November 1922	Joseph Maclay, Bt.	Former cabinet minister	King George V
	Baron Bethell	23 November 1922	John Bethell, Bt.	Former Member of Parliament for the Liberal Party	King George V
	Baron Hunsdon of Hunsdon	24 July 1923	Held by the Baron Aldenham (United Kingdom) since 1939		King George V
	Baron Hunsdon of Hunsdon	24 July 1923	Herbert Gibbs	—	King George V
	Baron Darling	12 January 1924	Charles Darling	Judicial Peer	King George V
	Baron Banbury of Southam	21 January 1924	Frederick Banbury, Bt.	Former Member of Parliament for the Conservative Party	King George V
	Baron Merrivale	19 January 1925	Henry Duke	Former cabinet minister	King George V
	Baron Bradbury	28 January 1925	John Bradbury	—	King George V
	Baron Stonehaven	12 June 1925	Held by the Earl of Kintore (Scotland) since 1974		King George V
	Baron Stonehaven	12 June 1925	John Baird, Bt.	Former cabinet minister	King George V
	Baron Irwin	22 December 1925	Earl of Halifax (United Kingdom)		King George V
	Baron Irwin	22 December 1925	Edward Wood (Note: 4th son of Charles Wood, 2nd Viscount Halifax)	Former cabinet minister	King George V
	Baron Mereworth	19 January 1926	(Kingdom of Ireland) Geoffrey Browne, Baron Oranmore and Browne	—	King George V
	Baron Hanworth	21 January 1926	Viscount Hanworth (United Kingdom)		King George V
	Baron Hanworth	21 January 1926	Ernest Pollock, Bt.	Incumbent Master of the Rolls	King George V
	Baron Greenway	18 January 1927	Charles Greenway, Bt.	Founder of Anglo-Persian Oil Company	King George V
	Baron Hayter	29 January 1927	George Chubb, Bt.	—	King George V
	Baron Cornwallis	31 January 1927	Fiennes Cornwallis	Incumbent Chairman of Kent County Council	King George V
	Baron Daresbury	21 June 1927	Gilbert Greenall, Bt.	—	King George V
	Baron Wraxall	11 January 1928	George Gibbs	Former Member of Parliament for the Conservative Party	King George V
	Baron Hailsham	5 April 1928	Viscount Hailsham (United Kingdom)		King George V
	Baron Hailsham	5 April 1928	Douglas Hogg	Incumbent Lord High Chancellor of Great Britain	King George V
	Baron Remnant	26 June 1928	James Remnant, Bt.	Former Member of Parliament for the Conservative Party	King George V
	Baron Moynihan	19 March 1929	Berkeley Moynihan, Bt.	—	King George V
	Baron Craigmyle	7 May 1929	(United Kingdom) Thomas Shaw, Baron Shaw	Judicial Peer	King George V
	Baron Camrose	19 June 1929	Viscount Camrose (United Kingdom)		King George V
	Baron Camrose	19 June 1929	William Berry, Bt.	Co-owner of The Daily Telegraph	King George V
	Baron Dulverton	8 July 1929	Gilbert Wills, Bt.	Former Member of Parliament for the Conservative Party	King George V
	Baron Luke	9 July 1929	George Lawson Johnston	—	King George V
	Baron Alvingham	10 July 1929	Robert Yerburgh	Former Member of Parliament for the Conservative Party	King George V
	Baron Baden-Powell	17 September 1929	Robert Baden-Powell, Bt.	Founder of The Scout Association	King George V
	Baron Ponsonby of Shulbrede	17 January 1930	Arthur Ponsonby (Note: Great-Grandson of Frederick Ponsonby, 3rd Earl of Bessborough)	Former Member of Parliament for the Labour Party	King George V
	Baron Dickinson	18 January 1930	Willoughby Dickinson	Former Chairman of the London County Council	King George V
	Baron Trenchard	23 January 1930	Viscount Trenchard (United Kingdom)		King George V
	Baron Trenchard	23 January 1930	Hugh Trenchard	Military Peerage–RAF	King George V
	Baron Noel-Buxton	17 June 1930	Noel Buxton	Former cabinet minister	King George V
	Baron Howard of Penrith	10 July 1930	Esmé Howard (Note: A descendant of Henry Howard, 22nd Earl of Arundel, in remainder of the Duke of Norfolk)	Former Ambassador to the United States	King George V
	Baron Rochester	23 January 1931	Ernest Lamb	—	King George V
	Baron Selsdon	14 January 1932	William Mitchell-Thomson	Former cabinet minister	King George V
	Baron Moyne	21 January 1932	Walter Guinness (Note: 3rd son of Edward Guinness, 1st Earl of Iveagh)	Former cabinet minister	King George V
	Baron Davies	21 June 1932	David Davies	Former Member of Parliament for the Liberal Party	King George V
	Baron Rankeillour	28 June 1932	James Hope (Note: Great-Grandson of John Hope, 2nd Earl of Hopetoun)	Former Chairman of Ways and Means	King George V
	Baron Runciman	17 January 1933	Viscount Runciman of Doxford (United Kingdom)		King George V
	Baron Runciman	17 January 1933	Walter Runciman, Bt.	—	King George V
	Baron Brocket	19 January 1933	Charles Nall-Cain, Bt.	—	King George V
	Baron Milne	26 January 1933	George Milne	Military Peerage–Army	King George V
	Baron Rennell	1 March 1933	Rennell Rodd	Former Ambassador to Italy	King George V
	Baron Mottistone	21 June 1933	J. E. B. Seely	Former cabinet minister	King George V
	Baron Iliffe	22 June 1933	Edward Iliffe	Former Member of Parliament for the Conservative Party	King George V
	Baron Palmer	24 June 1933	Ernest Palmer, Bt.	—	King George V
	Baron Rockley	11 January 1934	Evelyn Cecil (Note: Grandson of James Gascoyne-Cecil, 2nd Marquess of Salisbury)	Former Member of Parliament for the Conservative Party	King George V
	Baron Elton	16 January 1934	Godfrey Elton	—	King George V
	Baron Bingham	26 June 1934	(Kingdom of Ireland) George Bingham, Earl of Lucan	—	King George V
	Baron Wakehurst	29 June 1934	Gerald Loder	—	King George V
	Baron Hesketh	25 January 1935	Thomas Fermor-Hesketh, Bt.	Former Member of Parliament for the Conservative Party	King George V
	Baron Tweedsmuir	1 June 1935	John Buchan	Incumbent Governor General of Canada	King George V
	Baron Wigram	25 June 1935	Clive Wigram	Incumbent Private Secretary to the Sovereign	King George V
	Baron Riverdale	27 June 1935	Arthur Balfour, Bt.	—	King George V
	Baron May	28 June 1935	George May, Bt.	—	King George V
	Baron Kennet	15 July 1935	Hilton Young	Former cabinet minister	King George V
	Baron Gowrie	20 December 1935	Earl of Gowrie of the Peerage of the United Kingdom		King George V
	Baron Gowrie	20 December 1935	Alexander Hore-Ruthven (Note: 2nd son of Walter Hore-Ruthven, 9th Lord Ruthven of Freeland)	Incumbent Governor of New South Wales	King George V
	Baron Strathcarron	11 January 1936	Ian Macpherson, Bt.	Former cabinet minister	King George V
	Baron Kemsley	3 February 1936	Viscount Kemsley (United Kingdom)	King Edward VIII	
	Baron Kemsley	3 February 1936	Gomer Berry	King Edward VIII	—
	Baron Catto	24 February 1936	Thomas Catto, Bt.	King Edward VIII	—
	Baron Windlesham	22 February 1937	George Hennessy, Bt.	Former Member of Parliament for the Conservative Party	King George VI
	Baron Mancroft	23 February 1937	Arther Samuel, Bt.	Former Member of Parliament for the Conservative Party	King George VI
	Baron McGowan	24 February 1937	Harry McGowan	Chairman of Imperial Chemical Industries	King George VI
	Baron Addison	22 May 1937	Viscount Addison (United Kingdom)		King George VI
	Baron Addison	22 May 1937	Christopher Addison	Former cabinet minister	King George VI
	Baron Denham	24 May 1937	George Bowyer, Bt.	Former Member of Parliament for the Conservative Party	King George VI
	Baron Rea	3 June 1937	Walter Rea, Bt.	Former Member of Parliament for the Liberal Party	King George VI
	Baron Cadman	7 June 1937	John Cadman	Chairman of the Anglo-Persian Oil Company	King George VI
	Baron Marchwood	8 June 1937	Viscount Marchwood (United Kingdom)		King George VI
	Baron Marchwood	8 June 1937	George Penny, Bt.	Former Member of Parliament for the Conservative Party	King George VI
	Baron Kenilworth	10 June 1937	John Siddeley	—	King George VI
	Baron Pender	12 June 1937	John Denison-Pender	Former Member of Parliament for the Conservative Party	King George VI
	Baron Roborough	24 January 1938	Henry Lopes, Bt.	Former Member of Parliament for the Conservative Party	King George VI
	Baron Brassey of Apethorpe	26 January 1938	Henry Brassey, Bt.	Former Member of Parliament for the Conservative Party	King George VI
	Baron Stamp	28 June 1938	Josiah Stamp	—	King George VI
	Baron Bicester	29 June 1938	Vivian Smith	—	King George VI
	Baron Milford	2 February 1939	Laurence Philipps, Bt.	—	King George VI
	Baron Hankey	3 February 1939	Maurice Hankey	Former Cabinet Secretary	King George VI
	Baron Harmsworth	4 February 1939	Cecil Harmsworth	—	King George VI
	Baron Rotherwick	5 July 1939	Herbert Cayzer Bt.	Former Member of Parliament for the Conservative Party	King George VI
	Baron Woolton	7 July 1939	Earl of Woolton (United Kingdom)		King George VI
	Baron Woolton	7 July 1939	Frederick Marquis	—	King George VI
	Baron Glentoran	8 July 1939	Herbert Dixon	Former Member of Parliament for the Ulster Unionist Party	King George VI
	Baron Tryon	18 April 1940	George Tryon	Incumbent cabinet minister	King George VI
	Baron Croft	28 May 1940	Henry Page Croft, Bt.	Former Member of Parliament for the Conservative Party	King George VI
	Baron Teviot	27 June 1940	Charles Kerr (Note: Great-Grandson of William Kerr, 6th Marquess of Lothian)	Former Member of Parliament for the National Liberal Party	King George VI
	Baron Nathan	28 June 1940	Harry Nathan	Former Member of Parliament for the Labour Party	King George VI
	Baron Reith	21 October 1940	John Reith	Former Director-General of the BBC	King George VI
	Baron Kindersley	28 January 1941	Robert Kindersley	—	King George VI
	Baron Ironside	29 January 1941	Edmund Ironside	Military Peerage–Army	King George VI
	Baron Leathers	19 May 1941	Viscount Leathers (United Kingdom)		King George VI
	Baron Leathers	19 May 1941	Frederick Leathers	Incumbent cabinet minister	King George VI
	Baron Soulbury	6 August 1941	Viscount Soulbury (United Kingdom)		King George VI
	Baron Soulbury	6 August 1941	Herwald Ramsbotham	Former cabinet minister	King George VI
	Baron Latham	16 January 1942	Charles Latham	Incumbent Leader of the London County Council	King George VI
	Baron Wedgwood	21 January 1942	Josiah Wedgwood	Former cabinet minister	King George VI
	Baron Geddes	28 January 1942	Auckland Geddes	Former Ambassador to the United States	King George VI
	Baron Bruntisfield	9 March 1942	Baron Bruntisfield, Bt.	Former Member of Parliament for the Conservative Party	King George VI
	Baron Brabazon of Tara	27 March 1942	John Moore-Brabazon	Former cabinet minister	King George VI
	Baron Keyes	22 January 1943	Roger Keyes, Bt.	Military Peerage–Army	King George VI
	Baron Hemingford	1 February 1943	Dennis Herbert	Former Chairman of Ways and Means	King George VI
	Baron Moran	8 March 1943	Charles Wilson	Incumbent President of the Royal College of Physicians	King George VI
	Baron Killearn	17 May 1943	Miles Lampson	Incumbent Ambassador to Egypt	King George VI
	Baron Dowding	5 July 1943	Hugh Dowding	Military Peerage–RAF	King George VI
	Baron Gretton	27 January 1944	John Gretton	Former Member of Parliament for the Conservative Party	King George VI
	Baron Westwood	29 January 1944	William Westwood	—	King George VI
	Baron Hazlerigg	12 February 1945	Arthur Hazlerigg, Bt.	—	King George VI
	Baron Hacking	2 July 1945	Douglas Hacking, Bt.	Former Chairman of the Conservative Party	King George VI
	Baron Chetwode	10 July 1945	Philip Chetwode, Bt.	Military Peerage–Army	King George VI
	Baron Sandford	14 July 1945	James Edmondson	Former Member of Parliament for the Conservative Party	King George VI
	Baron Altrincham	1 August 1945	Edward Grigg	Former Governor of Kenya	King George VI
	Baron Broadbridge	14 September 1945	George Broadbridge, Bt.	Former Member of Parliament for the Conservative Party	King George VI
	Baron Pakenham	12 October 1945	Held by the Earl of Longford (Ireland) since 1961		King George VI
	Baron Pakenham	12 October 1945	Frank Pakenham (Note: 2nd son of Thomas Pakenham, 5th Earl of Longford)	—	King George VI
	Baron Mountevans	12 November 1945	Edward Evans	Military Peerage–Navy	King George VI
	Baron Lindsay of Birker	13 November 1945	Sandie Lindsay	—	King George VI
	Baron Piercy	14 November 1945	William Piercy	—	King George VI
	Baron Chorley	16 November 1945	Robert Chorley	—	King George VI
	Baron Calverley	17 November 1945	George Muff	Former Member of Parliament for the Labour Party	King George VI
	Baron Tedder	23 January 1946	Arthur Tedder	Military Peerage–RAF	King George VI
	Baron Colgrain	28 January 1946	Colin Campbell	—	King George VI
	Baron Darwen	12 February 1946	John Davies	—	King George VI
	Baron Lucas of Chilworth	26 June 1946	George Lucas	—	King George VI
	Baron Shepherd	28 June 1946	George Shepherd	National Agent of the Labour Party	King George VI
	Baron Newall	18 July 1946	Cyril Newall	Former Governor-General of New Zealand	King George VI
	Baron Oaksey	13 January 1947	Held by the Baron Trevethin (United Kingdom) since 1959		King George VI
	Baron Oaksey	13 January 1947	Geoffrey Lawrence (Note: 3rd son of Alfred Lawrence, 1st Baron Trevethin)	Judicial Peer	King George VI
	Baron Rugby	15 January 1947	John Maffey	Incumbent Ambassador to the Republic of Ireland	King George VI
	Baron Layton	16 January 1947	Walter Layton	Editor of The Economist	King George VI
	Baron Simon of Wythenshawe	17 January 1947	Ernest Simon	—	King George VI
	Baron Kershaw	20 January 1947	Fred Kershaw	—	King George VI
	Baron Trefgarne	21 January 1947	George Garro-Jones	Former Member of Parliament for the Labour Party	King George VI
	Baron Crook	3 July 1947	Reginald Crook	—	King George VI
	Baron Amwell	16 July 1947	Frederick Montague	Former Member of Parliament for the Labour Party	King George VI
	Baron Milverton	9 October 1947	Arthur Richards	Incumbent Governor of Nigeria	King George VI
	Baron Mackintosh of Halifax	6 February 1948	Viscount Mackintosh of Halifax (United Kingdom)		King George VI
	Baron Mackintosh of Halifax	6 February 1948	Harold Mackintosh, Bt.	—	King George VI
	Baron Clydesmuir	26 February 1948	John Colville	Former cabinet minister	King George VI
	Baron Burden	1 February 1950	Thomas Burden	Former Member of Parliament for the Labour Party	King George VI
	Baron Haden-Guest	2 February 1950	Leslie Haden-Guest	Former Member of Parliament for the Labour Party	King George VI
	Baron Silkin	4 July 1950	Lewis Silkin	Former cabinet minister	King George VI
	Baron Hives	7 July 1950	Ernest Hives	—	King George VI
	Baron Ogmore	10 July 1950	David Rees-Williams	Former Member of Parliament for the Labour Party	King George VI
	Baron Morris of Kenwood	11 July 1950	Harry Morris	Former Member of Parliament for the Labour Party	King George VI
	Baron Macpherson of Drumochter	25 January 1951	Thomas Macpherson	Former Member of Parliament for the Labour Party	King George VI
	Baron Kenswood	27 June 1951	Ernest Whitfield	—	King George VI
	Baron Freyberg	16 October 1951	(United Kingdom) (New Zealand) Bernard Freyberg	Incumbent Governor-General of New Zealand	King George VI
	Baron Milner of Leeds	20 December 1951	James Milner	Former Chairman of Ways and Means	King George VI
	Baron Kirkwood	22 December 1951	David Kirkwood	Former Member of Parliament for the Labour Party	King George VI
	Baron Wise	24 December 1951	Frederick Wise	Former Member of Parliament for the Labour Party	King George VI
	Baron Jeffreys	12 July 1952	George Jeffreys	Former Member of Parliament for the Conservative Party	Queen Elizabeth II
	Baron Rathcavan	12 February 1953	Hugh O'Neill, Bt. (Note: 3rd son of Edward O'Neill, 2nd Baron O'Neill)	Former Chairman of the 1922 Committee	Queen Elizabeth II
	Baron Baillieu	12 February 1953	(United Kingdom) (Australia) Clive Baillieu	—	Queen Elizabeth II
	Baron Grantchester	30 June 1953	Alfred Suenson-Taylor	—	Queen Elizabeth II
	Baron Moore	30 January 1954	(Kingdom of Ireland) Henry Moore, Earl of Drogheda	—	Queen Elizabeth II
	Baron Coleraine	16 February 1954	(United Kingdom) (Canada) Richard Law	Former cabinet minister	Queen Elizabeth II
	Baron Harvey of Tasburgh	3 July 1954	Oliver Harvey	Incumbent Ambassador to France	Queen Elizabeth II
	Baron Glassary	30 July 1954	(Kingdom of Scotland) Henry Scrymgeour-Wedderburn, Earl of Dundee	—	Queen Elizabeth II
	Baron Gridley	10 January 1955	Arnold Gridley	Former Chairman of the 1922 Committee	Queen Elizabeth II
	Baron Strathalmond	18 February 1955	William Fraser	Chairman of the Anglo-Persian Oil Company	Queen Elizabeth II
	Baron Strathclyde	4 May 1955	Thomas Galbraith	Former Member of Parliament for the Scottish Unionist Party	Queen Elizabeth II
	Baron Clitheroe	20 June 1955	Ralph Assheton	Former Chairman of the Conservative Party	Queen Elizabeth II
	Baron McNair	4 August 1955	Arnold McNair	Judicial Peer	Queen Elizabeth II
	Baron Colyton	19 January 1956	Henry Hopkinson	Former Member of Parliament for the Conservative Party	Queen Elizabeth II
	Baron Astor of Hever	21 January 1956	(United Kingdom) (United States) John Jacob Astor	Former Chairman of the General Council of the Press	Queen Elizabeth II
	Baron Sinclair of Cleeve	21 January 1957	Robert Sinclair	—	Queen Elizabeth II
	Baron Mills	22 January 1957	Viscount Mills (United Kingdom)		Queen Elizabeth II
	Baron Mills	22 January 1957	Percy Mills, Bt.	—	Queen Elizabeth II
	Baron Bridges	4 February 1957	Edward Bridges	Former Cabinet Secretary	Queen Elizabeth II
	Baron Norrie	22 August 1957	Willoughby Norrie	Former Governor-General of New Zealand	Queen Elizabeth II
	Baron Birkett	31 January 1958	Norman Birkett	Judicial Peer	Queen Elizabeth II
	Baron Harding of Petherton	17 February 1958	John Harding	Military Peerage–Army	Queen Elizabeth II
	Baron Poole	11 July 1958	Oliver Poole	Former Member of Parliament for the Conservative Party	Queen Elizabeth II
	Baron Rootes	16 February 1959	William Rootes	—	Queen Elizabeth II
	Baron Netherthorpe	10 March 1959	James Turner	—	Queen Elizabeth II
	Baron Crathorne	15 July 1959	Thomas Dugdale, Bt.	Former cabinet minister	Queen Elizabeth II
	Baron Spens	20 August 1959	Patrick Spens	Former Chief Justice of India	Queen Elizabeth II
	Baron MacAndrew	8 December 1959	Charles MacAndrew	Former Chairman of Ways and Means	Queen Elizabeth II
	Baron Nelson of Stafford	20 January 1960	George Nelson, Bt.	—	Queen Elizabeth II
	Baron Howick of Glendale	8 February 1960	Evelyn Baring (Note: 3rd son of Evelyn Baring, 1st Earl of Cromer)	Former Governor of Kenya	Queen Elizabeth II
	Baron Sanderson of Ayot	4 July 1960	Basil Sanderson	—	Queen Elizabeth II
	Baron Cobbold	23 November 1960	Cameron Cobbold	Incumbent Governor of the Bank of England	Queen Elizabeth II
	Baron Robertson of Oakridge	29 June 1961	Brian Robertson, Bt.	Chairman of the British Transport Commission	Queen Elizabeth II
	Baron Marks of Broughton	10 July 1961	Simon Marks	—	Queen Elizabeth II
	Baron Fairhaven	25 July 1961	(United Kingdom) (United States) Urban Huttleston Broughton, Baron Fairhaven		Queen Elizabeth II
	Baron Leighton of St Mellons	25 January 1962	Leighton Seager, Bt.	—	Queen Elizabeth II
	Baron Brain	26 January 1962	Russell Brain, Bt.	Incumbent President of the Royal College of Physicians	Queen Elizabeth II
	Baron Aldington	29 January 1962	Toby Low	Former Member of Parliament for the Conservative Party	Queen Elizabeth II
	Baron Inchyra	2 February 1962	Frederick Millar	Former Ambassador to West Germany	Queen Elizabeth II
	Baron Dilhorne	17 July 1962	Viscount Dilhorne (United Kingdom)		Queen Elizabeth II
	Baron Dilhorne	17 July 1962	Reginald Manningham-Buller, Bt.	Incumbent Lord High Chancellor of Great Britain	Queen Elizabeth II
	Baron Eccles	1 August 1962	Viscount Eccles (United Kingdom)		Queen Elizabeth II
	Baron Eccles	1 August 1962	David Eccles	Former cabinet minister	Queen Elizabeth II
	Baron Silsoe	18 January 1963	Malcolm Trustram Eve, Bt.	—	Queen Elizabeth II
	Baron Egremont	27 November 1963	Held by the Baron Leconfield (United Kingdom) since 1967		Queen Elizabeth II
	Baron Egremont	27 November 1963	John Wyndham (Note: Eldest son of Edward Scawen Wyndham, 5th Baron Leconfield)	—	Queen Elizabeth II
	Baron Thomson of Fleet	10 March 1964	(United Kingdom) (Canada) Roy Thomson	—	Queen Elizabeth II
	Baron Martonmere	13 May 1964	Roland Robinson	Former Member of Parliament for the Conservative Party	Queen Elizabeth II
	Baron Sherfield	29 June 1964	Roger Makins	Former Ambassador to the United States	Queen Elizabeth II
	Baron Inglewood	30 June 1964	William Fletcher-Vane (Note: A descendant of Gilbert Vane, 2nd Baron Barnard)	Former Member of Parliament for the Conservative Party	Queen Elizabeth II
	Baron Glendevon	16 July 1964	Lord John Hope (Note: 2nd son of Victor Hope, 2nd Marquess of Linlithgow)	Former cabinet minister	Queen Elizabeth II
	Baron Grimston of Westbury	11 December 1964	Robert Grimston (Note: Grandson of James Grimston, 2nd Earl of Verulam)	Former Member of Parliament for the Conservative Party	Queen Elizabeth II
	Baron Renwick	23 December 1964	Robert Renwick, Bt.	—	Queen Elizabeth II
	Baron St Helens	31 December 1964	Michael Hughes-Young	Former Member of Parliament for the Conservative Party	Queen Elizabeth II
	Baron Margadale	1 January 1965	John Morrison	Former Chairman of the 1922 Committee	Queen Elizabeth II

== Extinct peerages since the Passage of the House of Lords Act 1999 ==
=== Extinct dukedoms ===
Shield	Title	Creation	Extinct	Grantee	Reason	Monarch
	Duke of Edinburgh; Earl of Merioneth; Baron Greenwich	20 November 1947	8 September 2022 (Merged with the Crown)	Philip Mountbatten	On his wedding day to Princess Elizabeth	King George VI

=== Extinct earldoms ===
Shield	Title	Creation	Extinct	Grantee	Reason	Monarch
	Earl of Munster; Viscount FitzClarence; Baron Tewkesbury	4 June 1831	30 December 2000	George FitzClarence		King William IV
	Earl of Lovelace; Viscount Ockham	30 June 1838	31 January 2018	(Kingdom of Great Britain) William King-Noel, Baron King	—	Queen Victoria
	Earl of Halsbury; Viscount Tiverton	19 January 1898	31 December 2010	(United Kingdom) Hardinge Giffard, Baron Halsbury (Note: Created Baron Halsbury on 26 June 1885.)	Incumbent Lord High Chancellor of Great Britain	Queen Victoria
	Earl Kitchener; Viscount Broome; Baron Denton	27 July 1914	16 December 2011	(United Kingdom) Herbert Kitchener, Viscount Kitchener of Khartoum (Note: Created Viscount Kitchener of Khartoum on 11 July 1902.)	Military Peerage–Army	King George V

=== Extinct viscountcies ===
Shield	Title	Creation	Extinct	Grantee	Reason	Monarch
	Viscount Gough	15 June 1849	14 April 2023	(United Kingdom) Hugh Gough, Baron Gough (Note: Created Baron Gough on 7 April 1846.)	Military Peerage–Army	Queen Victoria
	Viscount Cross	19 August 1886	5 December 2004	R. A. Cross	Former Home Secretary	Queen Victoria
	Viscount Churchill	14 July 1902	18 October 2017	(United Kingdom) Victor Spencer, Baron Churchill	—	King Edward VII
	Viscount Leverhulme	27 November 1922	4 July 2000	(United Kingdom) William Lever, Baron Leverhulme (Note: Created Baron Leverhulme on 21 June 1917.)	—	King George V
	Viscount Craigavon	20 January 1927	31 March 2025	James Craig, Bt.	Incumbent Prime Minister of Northern Ireland	King George V
	Viscount Greenwood	16 February 1937	7 July 2003	(United Kingdom) Hamar Greenwood, Baron Greenwood (Note: Created Baron Greenwood on 31 August 1929.)	Former cabinet minister	King George VI
	Viscount Simon	20 May 1940	15 August 2021	John Simon	Incumbent Lord High Chancellor of Great Britain	King George VI
	Viscount Alanbrooke	29 January 1946	10 January 2018	(United Kingdom) Alan Brooke, Baron Alanbrooke (Note: Created Baron Alanbrooke on 18 September 1945.)	Military Peerage–Army	King George VI
	Viscount Malvern	18 March 1955	26 March 2013	Godfrey Huggins	Incumbent Prime Minister of the Federation of Rhodesia and Nyasaland	Queen Elizabeth II
	Viscount Ingleby	17 January 1956	14 August 2008	Osbert Peake	Former cabinet minister	Queen Elizabeth II

=== Extinct baronies ===
Shield	Title	Creation	Extinct	Grantee	Reason	Monarch
	Baron Lawrence	3 April 1869	14 August 2023	John Lawrence, Bt.	Former Viceroy of India	Queen Victoria
	Baron Deramore	18 November 1885	20 August 2006	Thomas Bateson, Bt.	Former Member of Parliament for the Conservative Party	Queen Victoria
	Baron Herschell	8 February 1886	26 October 2008	Farrer Herschell	Incumbent Lord High Chancellor of Great Britain	Queen Victoria
	Baron Lyell	4 July 1914	11 January 2017	Leonard Lyell, Bt.	Former Member of Parliament for the Liberal Party	King George V
	Baron Melchett	15 June 1928	29 August 2018	Alfred Mond, Bt.	Former cabinet minister	King George V
	Baron Sysonby	24 June 1935	23 October 2009	Frederick Ponsonby (Note: Great-Grandson of Frederick Ponsonby, 3rd Earl of Bessborough)	—	King George V
	Baron Wardington	17 July 1936	19 March 2019	Beaumont Pease	Chairman of Lloyds Bank	King Edward VIII
	Baron Chatfield	4 June 1937	30 September 2007	Ernle Chatfield	Military Peerage–Navy	King George VI
	Baron Birdwood	25 January 1938	11 July 2015	William Birdwood, Bt.	Military Peerage–Army	King George VI
	Baron Belstead	27 January 1938	3 December 2005	John Ganzoni, Bt.	Former Member of Parliament for the Conservative Party	King George VI
	Baron Balfour of Inchrye	5 July 1945	14 April 2013	Harold Balfour	Former Member of Parliament for the Conservative Party	King George VI
	Baron Broughshane	19 September 1945	24 March 2006	William Davison	Former Member of Parliament for the Conservative Party	King George VI
	Baron Wilson	12 March 1946	1 February 2009	Henry Maitland Wilson	Military Peerage–Army	King George VI
	Baron Citrine	16 July 1946	5 August 2006	Walter Citrine	Incumbent General Secretary of the Trades Union Congress	King George VI
	Baron Macdonald of Gwaenysgor	13 April 1949	27 January 2002	Gordon Macdonald	Former Governor of Newfoundland	King George VI
	Baron Greenhill	8 July 1950	13 January 2020	Ernest Greenhill	—	King George VI
	Baron Strang	16 January 1954	19 December 2014	William Strang	—	Queen Elizabeth II
	Baron Gladwyn	12 April 1960	15 August 2017	Gladwyn Jebb	Former Ambassador to France	Queen Elizabeth II
	Baron Erroll of Hale	19 December 1964	14 September 2000	Frederick Erroll	Former cabinet minister	Queen Elizabeth II

== Current titles without heirs ==
=== Current UK Peers ===
Title	Monarch	Notes
Dukes
Duke of York	Queen Elizabeth II	—
Duke of Westminster	Queen Victoria	Heirs to the Marquessate of Westminster (United Kingdom, 1831)
Marquesses
Marquess of Abergavenny	Queen Victoria	Heirs to the Earldom of Abergavenny (Great Britain, 1784)
Earls
Earl Russell	Queen Victoria	—
Earl Haig	King George V	—
Earl Attlee	Queen Elizabeth II	—
Earl of Woolton	Queen Elizabeth II	—
Viscounts
Viscount Long	King George V	—
Viscount Davidson	King George VI	—
Viscount Margesson	King George VI	—
Viscount Montgomery of Alamein	King George VI	—
Viscount Norwich	Queen Elizabeth II	—
Viscount Tenby	Queen Elizabeth II	—
Viscount Mills	Queen Elizabeth II	—
Barons
Baron Stratheden	King William IV	—
Baron Campbell	Queen Victoria	—
Baron Northbrook	Queen Victoria	Heirs to the Baring baronetcy, of Larkbeer (Great Britain, 1793)
Baron Burnham	King Edward VII	—
Baron de Villiers	King George V	—
Baron Swinfen	King George V	—
Baron Cullen of Ashbourne	King George V	—
Baron Glendyne	King George V	—
Baron Banbury of Southam	King George V	—
Baron Rennell	King George V	—
Baron May	King George V	—
Baron Croft	King George VI	—
Baron Milner of Leeds	King George VI	—
Baron Sinclair of Cleeve	Queen Elizabeth II	—
Baron Birkett	Queen Elizabeth II	—
Baron Robertson of Oakridge	Queen Elizabeth II	—
Baron Sherfield	Queen Elizabeth II	—
Baron Glendevon	Queen Elizabeth II	—

=== Current Scottish and Irish peers with British titles ===
Title	Imperial Title	Monarch	Notes
Earl
(Kingdom of Ireland) Earl of Arran	Baron Sudley	Queen Victoria	Heirs to the Earldom of Arran (Ireland, 1762)
(Kingdom of Ireland) Earl of Clancarty	Viscount Clancarty	King George IV	
(Kingdom of Ireland) Earl of Clancarty	Baron Trench	The Prince Regent	
Viscount
(Kingdom of Ireland) Viscount Powerscourt	Baron Powerscourt	Queen Victoria	Heirs to the Viscountcy of Powerscourt (Ireland, 1744)
Baron
(Kingdom of Ireland) Baron Rossmore	Baron Rossmore	Queen Victoria	—

== Peerages in remainder to other Peerages ==
- Subsidiary title.

Current Peerage	In Remainder	Reason
Earl of Wilton	(Kingdom of Great Britain) Marquess of Westminster	—
Earl Cawdor	(Kingdom of Scotland) Earl of Argyll	Descendant of the 2nd Earl of Argyll
Earl Granville	(Kingdom of Great Britain) Marquess of Stafford	2nd Son of the 1st Marquess of Stafford
Earl of Effingham	(Kingdom of England) Duke of Norfolk	—
Earl of Strafford	(Kingdom of Great Britain) Viscount Torrington	Great-grandson of the 1st Viscount Torrington
Earl Cowley	(Kingdom of Ireland) Earl of Mornington	5th Son of 1st Earl of Mornington
Earl Russell	(Kingdom of England) Duke of Bedford	3rd Son of the 6th Duke of Bedford
Earl of Wharncliffe	(Kingdom of Scotland) Earl of Bute	Grandson of the 3rd Earl of Bute
Earl of Plymouth	(United Kingdom) Earl of Powis	Great-grandson of the 1st Earl of Powis
Earl of Gowrie	(Kingdom of Scotland) Lord Ruthven of Freeland	2nd Son of the 9th Lord Ruthven of Freeland
Earl Alexander of Tunis	(Kingdom of Ireland) Earl of Caledon	3rd Son of the 4th Earl of Caledon
Viscount Bridport	(Kingdom of Great Britain) Viscount Hood	2nd Son of the 2nd Viscount Hood
Viscount Knollys	(Kingdom of England) Earl of Banbury	—
Viscount Ullswater	(United Kingdom) Earl of Lonsdale	Great-grandson of the 1st Earl of Lonsdale
Viscount Bridgeman	(United Kingdom) Earl of Bradford	Grandson of the 2nd Earl of Bradford
Viscount Daventry	(Kingdom of Great Britain) Baron Southampton	Created for the widow of the Speaker Edward FitzRoy, the 2nd Son of the 3rd Baron Southampton and 3xGreat-grandson of the 2nd Duke of Grafton
Viscount Daventry	(Kingdom of England) Duke of Grafton	Created for the widow of the Speaker Edward FitzRoy, the 2nd Son of the 3rd Baron Southampton and 3xGreat-grandson of the 2nd Duke of Grafton
Viscount Chandos	(Kingdom of Great Britain) Viscount Cobham	Grandson of the 4th Baron Lyttelton and the Barony of Lyttleton merged with the Viscountcy through Special remainder in 1889
Viscount Tenby	(United Kingdom) Earl Lloyd-George of Dwyfor	2nd Son of the 1st Earl Lloyd-George of Dwyfor
Viscount Stuart of Findhorn	(Kingdom of Scotland) Earl of Moray	3rd Son of the 17th Earl of Moray
Viscount Blakenham	(Kingdom of Ireland) Earl of Listowel	3rd Son of the 4th Earl of Listowel
Baron Manners	(Kingdom of England) Duke of Rutland	Grandson of the 3rd Duke of Rutland
Baron Churchill	(Kingdom of England) Duke of Marlborough	3rd Son of the 4th Duke of Marlborough
Baron de Mauley	(Kingdom of Ireland) Earl of Bessborough	3rd Son of the 3rd Earl of Bessborough
Baron Londesborough	(Kingdom of Ireland) Marquess Conyngham	3rd Son of the 1st Marquess Conyngham
Baron Raglan	(Kingdom of England) Duke of Beaufort	9th Son of the 5th Duke of Beaufort
Baron Chesham	(Kingdom of England) Duke of Devonshire	4th Son of the 1st Earl of Burlington and the Earldom of Burlington merged with the Dukedom in 1858
Baron Penrhyn	(Kingdom of Scotland) Earl of Morton	Grandson of the 14th Earl of Morton
Baron O'Neill	(Kingdom of Ireland) Viscount Chichester	Descendant of the 1st Viscount Chichester
Baron Sackville	(Kingdom of Great Britain) Earl De La Warr	4th Son of the 5th Earl De La Warr, the title was a created a special remainder for the 5th and 6th Sons
Baron Trevor	(Kingdom of Ireland) Marquess of Downshire	3rd Son of the 3rd Marquess of Downshire
Baron Ampthill	(Kingdom of England) Duke of Bedford	Grandson of the 6th Duke of Bedford
Baron Montagu of Beaulieu	(Kingdom of Scotland) Duke of Buccleuch	2nd Son of the 5th Duke of Buccleuch
Baron Amherst of Hackney	(United Kingdom) Marquess of Exeter	3rd Son of the Marquess of Exeter through Special remainder in 1909
Baron Hardinge of Penshurst	(United Kingdom) Viscount Hardinge	2nd Son of the 2nd Viscount Hardinge
Baron Cochrane of Cults	(Kingdom of Scotland) Earl of Dundonald	2nd Son of the 11th Earl of Dundonald
Baron Ponsonby of Shulbrede	(Kingdom of Ireland) Earl of Bessborough	Great-grandson of the 3rd Earl of Bessborough
Baron Howard of Penrith	(Kingdom of England) Duke of Norfolk	—
Baron Moyne	(United Kingdom) Earl of Iveagh	3rd Son of the 1st Earl of Iveagh
Baron Rankeillour	(Kingdom of Scotland) Earl of Hopetoun	Great-grandson of the 2nd Earl of Hopetoun
Baron Rockley	(Kingdom of Great Britain) Marquess of Salisbury	Grandson of the 2nd Marquess of Salisbury
Baron Teviot	(Kingdom of Scotland) Marquess of Lothian	Great-grandson of the 6th Marquess of Lothian
Baron Rathcavan	(United Kingdom) Baron O'Neill	3rd Son of the 2nd Baron O'Neill and Descendant of the 1st Viscount Chichester
Baron Rathcavan	(Kingdom of Ireland) Viscount Chichester	3rd Son of the 2nd Baron O'Neill and Descendant of the 1st Viscount Chichester
Baron Astor of Hever	(United Kingdom) Viscount Astor	3rd Son of the 1st Viscount Astor
Baron Howick of Glendale	(United Kingdom) Earl of Cromer	2nd Son of the 1st Earl of Cromer
Baron Inglewood	(Kingdom of England) Baron Barnard	Descendant of the 2nd Baron Barnard
Baron Glendevon	(United Kingdom) Marquess of Linlithgow	2nd Son of the 2nd Marquess of Linlithgow
Baron Grimston of Westbury	(United Kingdom) Earl of Verulam	Grandson of the 2nd Earl of Verulam

== Titles ==
Marquesses, earls, viscounts and barons are all addressed as 'Lord X', where 'X' represents either their territory or surname pertaining to their title. Marchionesses, countesses, viscountesses and baronesses are all addressed as 'Lady X'. Dukes and duchesses are addressed just as 'Duke' or 'Duchess' or, in a non-social context, 'Your Grace'

== Lists of peers ==
- 30 Dukes: see List of dukes in the peerages of Britain and Ireland
- 34 Marquesses: see List of marquesses in the peerages of Britain and Ireland
- 189 Earls and countesses: see List of earls in the peerages of Britain and Ireland
- 110 Viscounts: see List of viscounts in the peerages of Britain and Ireland
- 443 Hereditary Barons: see List of barons in the peerages of Britain and Ireland
- Women: see List of peerages created for women and List of peerages inherited by women

== See also ==
- British nobility
- Dukes in the United Kingdom
- History of the British peerage
- Marquesses in the United Kingdom
- Peerage of England
- Peerage of Great Britain
- Peerage of Ireland
- Peerage of Scotland
- Peerages in the United Kingdom
