= List of hereditary baronies in the Peerage of the United Kingdom =

Peerages and baronetcies of Britain and Ireland
Extant	All
Dukes	Dukedoms
Marquesses	Marquessates
Earls	Earldoms
Viscounts	Viscountcies
Barons	Baronies
En, Sc, GB, Ire, UK (law, life: 1958–1979, 1979–1997, 1997–2010, 2010–2024, 2024–present)
Baronets	Baronetcies

This page, one list of hereditary baronies, lists all baronies, extant, extinct, dormant, abeyant, or forfeit, in the Peerage of the United Kingdom.

== George III (1801–1811) ==
Title	Date of creation	Surname	Current status	Notes
Baron Moore	17 January 1801	Moore	extinct 1892	also Marquess of Drogheda
Baron Loftus	19 January 1801	Tottenham Loftus	extant	also Marquess of Ely
Baron Butler	20 January 1801	Butler	extinct 1820	also Earl of Ormonde
Baron Carysfort	21 January 1801	Proby	extinct 1909	also Earl of Carysfort
Baron Alvanley	22 May 1801	Arden	extinct 1857	
Baroness Abercromby	28 May 1801	Abercromby	extinct 1924	
Baron Grey	23 June 1801	Grey	extant	created Earl Grey in 1806
Baron Saint Helens	31 July 1801	Fitzherbert	extinct 1839	also Baron Saint Helens in Ireland
Baron Nelson	18 August 1801	Nelson	extant	created Viscount Nelson on 22 May 1801, which title became extinct on 21 October 1805; created Earl Nelson on 20 November 1805
Baron Thomond	2 October 1801	O'Brien	extinct 10 February 1808	also Marquess of Thomond in Ireland
Baron Arklow	27 November 1801	Guelph	extinct 21 April 1843	subsidiary title of the Duke of Sussex
Baron Culloden	27 November 1801	Guelph	extinct 17 March 1904	subsidiary title of the Duke of Cambridge
Baron Keith	15 December 1801	Elphinstone	extinct 10 March 1823	also Baron Keith in Ireland; created Baron Keith on 17 September 1803 and Viscount Keith on 1 June 1814
Baron Hutchinson	16 December 1801	Hely-Hutchinson	extinct 29 June 1832	also Earl of Donoughmore in Ireland
Baron Redesdale	15 February 1802	Mitford	extinct 2 May 1886	created Earl of Redesdale in 1877
Baron Rivers	1 April 1802	Pitt	extinct 31 March 1880	also Baron Rivers until 1828
Baron Ellenborough	19 April 1802	Law	extant	created Earl of Ellenborough on 22 October 1844, which title became extinct on 22 December 1871
Baroness Sandys	19 June 1802	Hill	extant	
Baron Arden	28 July 1802	Percival	extinct 10 January 1929	also Baron Arden in Ireland; succeeded as Earl of Egmont in 1841
Baron Sheffield	29 July 1802	Baker Holroyd	extinct 21 April 1909	also Baron Sheffield in Ireland; created Earl of Sheffield in Ireland in 1816, which title became extinct in 1909
Baron Dunira	24 December 1802	Dundas	extant	subsidiary title of the Viscount Melville
Baron Keith	17 September 1803	Elphinstone	extinct 11 November 1867	also Baron Keith in Ireland and Baron Keith; created Viscount Keith on 1 June 1814
Baron Herbert	14 May 1804	Clive	extant	subsidiary title of the Earl of Powis
Baron Powis	14 May 1804	Clive	extant	subsidiary title of the Earl of Powis
Baron Lake	1 September 1804	Lake	extinct 24 June 1848	created Viscount Lake on 4 November 1807
Baron Barham	1 May 1805	Middleton	extant	created Earl of Gainsborough 1841
Baron Collingwood	20 November 1805	Collingwood	extinct 7 March 1810	
Baron Erskine	10 February 1806	Erskine	extant	succeeded as Earl of Buchan in Scotland in 1960
Baron Soberton	17 February 1806	Anson	extant	subsidiary title of the Viscount Anson; created Earl of Lichfield on 15 September 1831
Baron Monteagle	20 February 1806	Brown	extant	also Marquess of Sligo in Ireland
Baron Ardrossan	21 February 1806	Montgomery	extant	also Earl of Eglinton in Scotland
Baron Lauderdale	22 February 1806	Maitland	extinct 22 March 1863	also Earl of Lauderdale in Scotland
Baron Granard	24 February 1806	Forbes	extant	also Earl of Granard in Ireland
Baron Crewe	25 February 1806	Crewe	extinct 3 January 1894	
Baron Beauchamp	26 February 1806	Lygon	extinct 3 January 1979	created Earl Beauchamp on 1 December 1815
Baron Ponsonby	13 March 1806	Ponsonby	extinct 1866	created Viscount Ponsonby in 1839, which title became extinct in 1855
Baron Ailsa	12 November 1806	Kennedy	extant	also Earl of Cassillis in Scotland; created Marquess of Ailsa in 1831
Baron Breadalbane	13 November 1806	Campbell	extinct 8 November 1862	also Earl of Breadalbane and Holland in Scotland; created Marquess of Breadalbane in 1831
Baron Gardner	27 November 1806	Gardner	dormant 1883	also Baron Gardner in Ireland
Baron Manners	20 April 1807	Manners Sutton	extant	
Baron Greenock	9 November 1807	Cathcart	extant	subsidiary title of the Viscount Cathcart; created Earl Cathcart in 1814
Baron Gambier	9 November 1807	Gambier	extinct 1833	
Baron Hopetoun	3 February 1809	Hope	extant	also Earl of Hopetoun in Scotland; created Marquess of Linlithgow on 27 October 1902
Baron Douro	4 September 1809	Wellesley	extant	subsidiary title of the Viscount Wellington; created Earl of Wellington on 28 February 1812, Marquess of Wellington on 3 October 1812 and Duke of Wellington on 11 May 1814; also Earl of Mornington from 25 July 1863

== Regency (1811–1820) ==
Title	Date of creation	Surname	Current status	Notes
Baron Wilmington	7 September 1812	Compton	extant	subsidiary title of the Marquess of Northampton
Baron Niddry	17 May 1814	Hope	extant	also Earl of Hopetoun from 1816; created Marquess of Linlithgow in 1902
Baron Lynedoch	17 May 1814	Graham	extinct 18 December 1843	
Baron Combermere	17 May 1814	Cotton	extant	created Viscount Combermere on 8 February 1827
Baron Hill	17 May 1814	Hill	extinct 10 December 1842	created Baron Hill on 16 January 1816 and Viscount Hill on 27 September 1842
Baron Beresford	17 May 1814	Beresford	extinct 8 January 1854	created Viscount Beresford on 22 April 1823
Baron Exmouth	1 June 1814	Pellew	extant	created Viscount Exmouth on 10 December 1816
Baron Stewart	1 July 1814	Stewart	extant	created Earl Vane on 8 July 1823; succeeded as Marquess of Londonderry in 1872
Baron Trench	4 August 1815	Trench Le Poer	extant	also Earl of Clancarty in Ireland
Baron Bowes	7 August 1815	Bowes	extinct 3 July 1820	also Earl of Strathmore and Kinghorne in Scotland
Baron Dalhousie	11 August 1815	Ramsay	extinct 22 December 1860	also Earl of Dalhousie in Scotland; created Marquess of Dalhousie on 25 August 1849
Baron Meldrum	11 August 1815	Gordon	extant	also Earl of Aboyne in Scotland; succeeded as Marquess of Huntly in 1836
Baron Ross	11 August 1815	Boyle	extinct 1890	also Earl of Glasgow in Scotland
Baron Grinstead	11 August 1815	Cole	extant	also Earl of Enniskillen in Ireland
Baron Foxford	11 August 1815	Pery	extant	also Earl of Limerick in Ireland
Baron Churchill	11 August 1815	Spencer	extant	created Viscount Churchill in 1902
Baron Melbourne	11 August 1815	Lamb	extinct 1853	also Viscount Melbourne in Ireland; also Baron Beauvale from 1848
Baron Harris	11 August 1815	Harris	extant	
Baron Adbaston	25 November 1815	Whitworth	extinct 1825	subsidiary title of the Earl Whitworth
Baron Hill	16 January 1816	Hill	extant	also Baron Hill, which title became extinct on 10 December 1842; created Viscount Hill on 27 September 1842
Baron Prudhoe	27 November 1816	Percy	extinct 12 February 1865	succeeded as Duke of Northumberland in 1847
Baron Colchester	3 June 1817	Abbot	extinct 26 February 1919	

== George IV (1820–1830) ==
Title	Date of creation	Surname	Current status	Notes
Baron Ker	17 July 1821	Kerr	extant	also Marquess of Lothian in Scotland
Baron Minster	17 July 1821	Conyngham	extant	also Marquess Conyngham in Ireland
Baron Ormonde	17 July 1821	Butler	extinct 25 October 1997	also Earl of Ormonde in Ireland
Baron Wemyss	17 July 1821	Douglas	extant	also Earl of Wemyss and Earl of March in Scotland
Baron Clanbrassil	17 July 1821	Jocelyn	extinct 3 July 1897	also Earl of Roden in Ireland
Baron Kingston	17 July 1821	King	extinct 8 September 1869	also Earl of Kingston in Ireland
Baron Silchester	17 July 1821	Pakenham	extant	also Earl of Longford in Ireland
Baron Glenlyon	17 July 1821	Murray	extinct 8 May 1957	succeeded as Duke of Atholl in Scotland in 1846
Baron Maryborough	17 July 1821	Pole	extinct 25 July 1863	
Baron Oriel	17 July 1821	Foster, Skeffington	extant	also Viscount Ferrard in Ireland from 1828 and Viscount Massereene in Ireland from 1843
Baron Stowell	17 July 1821	Scott	extinct 28 January 1836	
Baron Ravensworth	17 July 1821	Liddell	extant	created Earl of Ravensworth on 2 April 1874, which title became extinct on 7 February 1904
Baron Delamere	17 July 1821	Cholmondeley	extant	
Baron Forester	17 July 1821	Forester	extant	
Baroness Rayleigh	8 July 1821	Strutt	extant	
Baron Bexley	1 March 1823	Vansittart	extinct 8 February 1851	
Baron Gifford	30 January 1824	Gifford	extant	
Baron Penshurst	26 January 1825	Smythe	extinct 9 January 1869	also Viscount Strangford in Ireland
Baron Tadcaster	3 July 1826	O'Bryen	extinct 21 August 1846	also Marquess of Thomond in Ireland
Baron Somerhill	4 July 1826	de Burgh	extinct 12 April 1916	also Marquess of Clanricarde in Ireland
Baron Wigan	5 July 1826	Lindsay	extant	also Earl of Crawford and Earl of Balcarres in Scotland
Baron Ranfurly	6 July 1826	Knox	extant	also Viscount Northland in Ireland; created Earl of Ranfurly in Ireland on 14 September 1831
Baron Farnborough	8 July 1826	Long	extinct 17 January 1838	
Baron de Tabley	10 July 1826	Leicester	extinct 22 November 1895	
Baron Wharncliffe	12 July 1826	Mackenzie	extant	
Baron Feversham	14 July 1826	Duncombe	extant	created Earl of Feversham on 25 July 1868, which title became extinct on 4 September 1963
Baron Seaford	15 July 1826	Ellis	extant	
Baron Lyndhurst	25 April 1827	Copley	extinct 12 October 1863	
Baron Fife	28 April 1827	Duff	extinct 9 March 1857	also Earl Fife in Ireland
Baron Tenterden	30 April 1827	Abbott	extinct 16 September 1939	
Baron Plunket	1 May 1827	Plunket	extant	
Baron Melros	24 July 1827	Hamilton	extinct 1 December 1858	also Earl of Haddington in Scotland from 17 March 1828
Baron Cowley	21 January 1828	Wellesley	extant	created Earl Cowley on 11 April 1857
Baron Stuart de Rothesay	22 January 1828	Stuart	extinct 6 November 1845	
Baron Heytesbury	23 January 1828	À Court	extant	
Baron Rosebery	26 January 1828	Primrose	extant	also Earl of Rosebery
Baron Clanwilliam	28 January 1828	Meade	extant	also Earl of Clanwilliam
Baron Durham	29 January 1828	Lambton	extant	created Earl of Durham on 23 March 1833
Baron Skelmersdale	30 January 1828	Wilbraham	extant	created Earl of Lathom on 3 May 1880, which title became extinct 6 February 1930
Baron Wallace	2 February 1828	Wallace	extinct 23 February 1844	
Baron Wynford	5 June 1829	Best	extant	

== William IV (1830–1837) ==
Title	Date of creation	Surname	Current status	Notes
Baron Brougham and Vaux	22 November 1830	Brougham	extinct 7 May 1868	created Baron Brougham and Vaux on 22 March 1860
Baron Tewkesbury	4 June 1831	FitzClarence	extinct 30 December 2000	subsidiary title of the Earl of Munster
Baron Kilmarnock	17 June 1831	Hay, Carr	extant	also Earl of Erroll in Scotland until 24 January 1941
Baron Fingall	20 June 1831	Plunkett	extinct 5 March 1984	also Earl of Fingall in Ireland
Baron Sefton	20 June 1831	Molyneux	extinct 13 April 1972	also Earl of Sefton in Ireland
Baron Clements	20 June 1831	Clements	extinct 9 June 1952	also Earl of Leitrim in Ireland
Baron Rossie	20 June 1831	Kinnaird	extinct 7 January 1878	also Lord Kinnaird in Scotland
Baron Dover	20 June 1831	Agar Ellis	extinct 10 September 1899	also Viscount Clifden in Ireland and Baron Mendip in Great Britain from 1836
Baron Cavendish of Keighley	10 September 1831	Cavendish	extant	subsidiary title of the Earl of Burlington; succeeded as Duke of Devonshire on 18 January 1858
Baron Kenlis	10 September 1831	Taylour	extant	also Marquess of Headfort in Ireland
Baron Chaworth	10 September 1831	Brabazon	extant	also Earl of Meath in Ireland
Baron Dunmore	10 September 1831	Murray	extinct 12 August 1980	also Earl of Dunmore in Scotland
Baron Ludlow	10 September 1831	Ludlow	extinct 16 April 1842	also Earl Ludlow in Ireland
Baron Hamilton	10 September 1831	Hamilton	extinct 22 December 1868	also Lord Belhaven and Stenton in Scotland
Baron Howden	10 September 1831	Cradock	extinct 9 October 1873	also Baron Howden in Ireland
Baron Panmure	10 September 1831	Maule	extinct 6 July 1874	
Baron Oakley	10 September 1831	Cadogan	extant	also Earl Cadogan from 1832
Baron Poltimore	10 September 1831	Bampfylde	extant	
Baron Wenlock	10 September 1831	Lawley	extinct 10 April 1834	
Baron Mostyn	10 September 1831	Lloyd	extant	
Baron Segrave	10 September 1831	Berkeley	extinct 10 October 1857	created Earl Fitzhardinge on 17 August 1841
Baron Templemore	10 September 1831	Chichester	extant	
Baron Dinorben	10 September 1831	Hughes	extinct 6 October 1852	
Baron Cloncurry	14 September 1831	Lawless	extinct 18 July 1929	also Baron Cloncurry in Ireland
Baron de Saumarez	15 September 1831	Saumarez	extant	
Baron Godolphin	14 May 1832	Osborne	extinct 20 March 1964	also Duke of Leeds from 1859
Baron Hunsdon	15 May 1832	Cary	extinct 12 March 1884	also Viscount of Falkland in Scotland
Baron Amesbury	16 May 1832	Dundas	extinct 30 June 1832	
Baron Stanley of Bickerstaffe	22 December 1832	Smith Stanley	extant	also Earl of Derby from 1834
Baron Western	28 January 1833	Western	extinct 4 November 1844	
Baron Raby	29 January 1833	Vane	extinct 21 August 1891	subsidiary title of the Duke of Cleveland
Baron Leveson	10 May 1833	Leveson Gower	extant	subsidiary title of the Earl Granville
Baron Solway	7 June 1833	Douglas	extinct 3 December 1837	also Marquess of Queensberry in Scotland
Baron Denman	28 March 1834	Denman	extant	
Baroness Wenman	3 June 1834	Wykam	extinct 9 August 1870	
Baron Duncannon	19 July 1834	Ponsonby	extant	succeeded as Earl of Bessborough in Ireland on 3 February 1844
Baron Fitzgerald	10 January 1835	Vesey-FitzGerald	extinct 11 May 1843	also Baron Fitzgerald and Vesey in Ireland
Baron Abinger	12 January 1835	Scarlett	extant	
Baron de L'Isle and Dudley	13 January 1835	Sidney	extant	created Viscount De L'Isle in 1956
Baron Bottesford	10 March 1835	Manners Sutton	extinct 1941	subsidiary title of the Viscount Canterbury
Baron Ashburton	10 April 1835	Baring	extant	
Baron Glenelg	8 May 1835	Grant	extinct 1866	
Baron Hatherton	11 May 1835	Littleton	extant	
Baron Strafford	12 May 1835	Byng	extant	created Earl of Strafford in 1847
Baron Worlingham	13 June 1835	Acheson	extant	also Earl of Gosford in Ireland
Baron Cottenham	20 January 1836	Pepys	extant	created Earl of Cottenham in 1850
Baroness Stratheden	22 January 1836	Campbell	extant	
Baron Langdale	23 January 1836	Bickersteth	extinct 18 April 1851	
Baron Portman	27 January 1837	Portman	extant	created Viscount Portman on 28 March 1873
Baron Moreton	28 January 1837	Moreton	extant	subsidiary title of the Earl of Ducie
Baron Lovat	28 January 1837	Fraser	extant	
Baron Worsley	30 January 1837	Pelham	extant	subsidiary title of the Earl of Yarborough
Baron Bateman	30 January 1837	Hanbury	extinct 4 November 1931	
Baron Charlemont	13 February 1837	Caulfeild	extinct 12 January 1892	also Earl of Charlemont in Ireland

== Victoria (1837–1901) ==
Title	Date of creation	Surname	Current status	Notes
Baron Kintore	1838	Keith Falconer	extinct 25 May 1966	also Earl of Kintore in Scotland
Baron Lismore	1838	O'Callaghan	extinct 29 October 1898	also Viscount Lismore in Ireland
Baron Rossmore	1838	Westenra	extant	also Baron Rossmore in Ireland
Baron Carew	1838	Carew	extant	also Baron Carew in Ireland
Baron de Mauley	1838	Ponsonby	extant	
Baron Wrottesley	1838	Wrottesley	extant	
Baron Sudeley	1838	Hanbury Tracy	extant	
Baron Methuen	1838	Methuen	extant	
Baron Beauvale	1839	Lamb	extinct 29 January 1853	succeeded as Viscount Melbourne in Ireland on 24 November 1848
Baron Furnival	1839	Talbot	extinct 29 October 1849	also Baron Talbot of Malahide in Ireland
Baron Stanley of Alderley	1839	Stanley	extant	
Baron Stuart de Decies	1839	Villiers Stuart	extinct 23 January 1874	
Baron Leigh	1839	Leigh	extant	
Baron Wenlock	1839	Thompson	extinct 14 June 1932	
Baron Lurgan	1839	Brownlow	extinct 17 September 1991	
Baron Colborne	1839	Ridley Colborne	extinct 3 May 1854	
Baron de Freyne	1839	French	extinct 29 September 1856	created Baron de Freyne on 5 April 1851
Baron Dunfermline	1839	Abercromby	extinct 2 July 1868	
Baron Monteagle of Brandon	1839	Spring Rice	extant	
Baron Seaton	1839	Colborne	extinct 12 March 1955	
Baron Eden	1839	Eden	extinct 1 January 1849	subsidiary title of the Earl of Auckland
Baron Keane	1839	Keane	extinct 27 November 1901	
Baron Sydenham	1840	Poulett Thomson	extinct 19 September 1841	
Baron Campbell	1841	Campbell	extant	
Baron Noel	1841	Noel	extant	subsidiary title of the Earl of Gainsborough
Baron Oxenfoord	1841	Dalrymple	extant	also Earl of Stair
Baron Kenmare	1841	Browne	extinct 1853	also Earl of Kenmare
Baron Ennishowen and Carrickfergus	1841	Chichester	extinct 1883	also Marquess of Donegall in Ireland from 1844 to 1883
Baron Vivian	1841	Vivian	extant	
Baron Congleton	1841	Parnell	extant	
Baron Metcalfe	1845	Metcalfe	extinct 1846	
Baron Gough	1846	Gough	extinct 14 April 2023	created Viscount Gough in 1849
Baron Acheson	1847	Acheson	extant	also Earl of Gosford from 1849
Baron Dartrey	1847	Dawson	extinct 9 February 1933	also Baron Cremorne; created Earl of Dartrey on 12 July 1866
Baron Milford	1847	Philipps	extinct 3 January 1857	
Baron Eddisbury	1848	Stanley	extant	
Baron Elgin	1849	Bruce	extant	also Earl of Elgin and Earl of Kincardine in Scotland
Baron Clandeboye	1850	Blackwood	extinct 29 May 1988	created Earl of Dufferin on 13 November 1871 and Marquess of Dufferin and Ava on 17 November 1888, which titles became extinct on 29 May 1988
Baron Londesborough	1850	Denison	extant	created Earl of Londesborough in 1887, which titles became extinct in 1963
Baron Overstone	1850	Loyd	extinct 1883	
Baron Truro	1850	Wilde	extinct 1899	
Baron Cranworth	1850	Rolfe	extinct 1868	
Baron Broughton	1851	Hobhouse	extinct 1869	
Baron de Freyne	1851	French	extant	also Baron de Freyne, which title became extinct in 1856
Baron St Leonards	1852	Sugden	extinct 1985	
Baron Raglan	1852	Somerset	extant	
Baron Aveland	1856	Heathcote	extinct 1983	also Baron Willoughby de Eresby from 1888 to 1983; created Earl of Ancaster in 1892
Baron Kenmare	1856	Browne	extinct 1952	also Earl of Kenmare in Ireland
Baron Lyons	1856	Lyons	extinct 1887	created Viscount Lyons (1881)
Baron Wensleydale	1856	Parke	extinct 25 February 1868	also Baron Wensleydale for life
Baron Belper	1856	Strutt	extant	
Baron Talbot de Malahide	1856	Talbot	extinct 14 April 1973	also Baron Talbot de Malahide in Ireland
Baron Ebury	1857	Grosvenor	extant	also Earl of Wilton from 1 October 1999
Baron Macaulay	1857	Macaulay	extinct 28 December 1859	
Baron Skene	1857	Duff	extinct 29 January 1912	also Earl Fife in Ireland; created Earl of Fife on 13 July 1885, Duke of Fife on 29 July 1889 and Duke of Fife on 16 October 1899
Baron Chesham	1858	Cavendish	extant	
Baron Chelmsford	1858	Thesiger	extant	created Viscount Chelmsford on 3 June 1921
Baron Churston	1858	Buller Yarde Buller	extant	
Baron Strathspey	1858	Grant	extinct 31 March 1884	also Earl of Seafield in Scotland
Baron Clyde	1858	Campbell	extinct 14 August 1863	
Baron Kingsdown	1858	Pemberton Leigh	extinct 7 October 1867	
Baron Leconfield	1859	Wyndham	extant	also Baron Egremont from 1967
Baron Egerton	1859	Egerton	extinct 30 January 1958	created Earl Egerton on 22 July 1897
Baron Tredegar	1859	Morgan	extinct 17 November 1962	created Viscount Tredegar on 28 December 1905, which title became extinct on 11 March 1913, and Viscount Tredegar on 4 August 1926, which title became extinct on 27 April 1949
Baron Elphinstone	1859	Elphinstone	extinct 19 July 1860	also Lord Elphinstone in Scotland
Baron Lyveden	1859	Smith	extant	
Baron Llanover	1859	Hall	extinct 27 April 1867	
Baron Taunton	1859	Labouchere	extinct 13 July 1869	
Baron Brougham and Vaux	1860	Brougham	extant	also Baron Brougham and Vaux, which title became extinct on 7 May 1868
Baron Kinnaird	1860	Kinnaird	extinct 27 February 1997	also Lord Kinnaird in Scotland
Baron Herbert of Lea	1861	Herbert	extant	succeeded as Earl of Pembroke in 1862
Baron Westbury	1861	Bethell	extant	
Baron FitzHardinge	1861	Berkeley	extinct 5 December 1916	
Baroness Castlehaven	1861	Sutherland-Leveson-Gower	extant	subsidiary title of the Countess of Cromartie
Baroness Macleod	1861	Sutherland-Leveson-Gower	extant	subsidiary title of the Countess of Cromartie
Baron Annaly	1863	White	extant	
Baron Houghton	1863	Milnes	extinct 20 June 1945	created Earl of Crewe on 17 July 1895 and Marquess of Crewe on 3 July 1911
Baroness Buckhurst	1864	Sackville, West	extant	also Earl De La Warr in Great Britain from 9 January 1870
Baron Romilly	1866	Romilly	extinct 29 June 1983	
Baron Northbrook	1866	Baring	extant	created Earl of Northbrook on 10 June 1876, which titles became extinct on 12 April 1929
Baron Barrogill	1866	Sinclair	extinct 25 May 1889	also Earl of Caithness in Scotland
Baron Clermont	1866	Fortescue	extinct 29 July 1887	also Baron Clermont in Ireland
Baron Meredyth	1866	Somerville	extinct 8 January 1929	also Baron Athlumney in Ireland
Baron Kenry	1866	Windham-Quin	extinct 14 June 1926	also Earl of Dunraven and Mount-Earl in Ireland
Baron Monck	1866	Monck	extant	also Viscount Monck in Ireland
Baron Hartismere	1866	Henniker, Henniker-Major	extant	also Baron Henniker in Ireland
Baron Lytton	1866	Bulwer Lytton	extant	created Earl of Lytton on 28 April 1880
Baron Hylton	1866	Jolliffe	extant	
Baron Strathnairn	1866	Rose	extinct 16 October 1885	
Baron Penrhyn	1866	Douglas Pennant	extant	
Baron Brancepeth	1866	Hamilton Russell	extant	also Viscount Boyne in Ireland
Baron Colonsay	1867	McNeill	extinct 31 January 1874	
Baron Cairns	1867	Cairns	extant	created Earl Cairns on 27 September 1878
Baron Kesteven	1868	Trollope	extinct 5 November 1915	
Baron Ormathwaite	1868	Walsh	extinct 8 March 1984	
Baron Fitzwalter	1868	Bridges	extinct 6 December 1875	
Baron O'Neill	1868	O'Neill	extant	
Baron Napier of Magdala	1868	Napier	extant	
Baron Gormanston	1868	Preston	extant	also Viscount Gormanston in Ireland
Baron Hatherley	1868	Wood	extinct 1881	
Baron Lawrence	1869	Lawrence	extinct 14 August 2023	
Baron Penzance	1869	Wilde	extinct 1899	
Baron Dunning	1869	Rogerson Rollo	extant	also Lord Rollo in Scotland
Baron Balinhard	1869	Carnegie	extant	also Earl of Southesk in Scotland; also Duke of Fife from 1992
Baron Hare	1869	Hare	extant	also Earl of Listowel in Ireland
Baron Howard of Glossop	1869	FitzAlan Howard	extant	also Duke of Norfolk since 1975
Baron Castletown	1869	FitzPatrick	extinct 1937	
Baron Acton	1869	Dalberg-Acton	extant	
Baron Robartes	1869	Agar-Robartes	extinct 1974	
Baron Wolverton	1869	Glyn	extant	
Baron Greville	1869	Greville-Nugent	extinct 9 December 1987	
Baron Kildare	1870	Fitzgerald	extant	also Duke of Leinster from 1874
Baron O'Hagan	1870	O'Hagan	extant	
Baron Lisgar	1870	Young	extinct 6 October 1876	
Baron Dalling and Bulwer	1871	Bulwer	extinct 23 May 1872	
Baron Sandhurst	1871	Mansfield	extant	created Viscount Sandhurst on 1 January 1917, which title became extinct in 1921
Baroness Burdett-Coutts	1871	Burdett-Coutts	extinct 30 December 1906	
Baron Bloomfield	1871	Bloomfield	extinct 17 August 1879	also Baron Bloomfield in Ireland
Baron Blachford	1871	Rogers	extinct 1889	
Baron Ettrick	1872	Napier	extant	also Lord Napier in Scotland
Baron Hanmer	1872	Hanmer	extinct 1881	
Baron Selborne	1872	Palmer	extant	created Earl of Selborne in 1882
Baron Breadalbane	1873	Campbell	extinct 1922	also Earl of Breadalbane and Holland
Baron Somerton	1873	Agar	extant	also Earl of Normanton in Ireland
Baron Waveney	1873	Adair	extinct 1886	
Baron Marjoribanks	1873	Robertson	extinct 1873	
Baron Aberdare	1873	Bruce	extant	
Baron Lanerton	1874	Howard	extinct 1880	
Baron Moncreiff	1874	Moncreiff	extant	
Baron Coleridge	1874	Coleridge	extant	
Baron Emly	1874	Monsell	extinct 24 November 1932	
Baron Carlingford	1874	Parkinson Fortescue	extinct 30 January 1898	
Baron Cottesloe	1874	Fremantle	extant	
Baron Hammond	1874	Hammond	extinct 29 April 1890	
Baron Hampton	1874	Pakington	extant	
Baron Winmarleigh	1874	Wilson Patten	extinct 11 July 1892	
Baron Eslington	1874	Liddell	extinct 7 February 1904	subsidiary title of the Earl of Ravensworth
Baron Douglas	1875	Home	extant	also Earl of Home
Baron Ramsay	1875	Ramsay	extant	also Earl of Dalhousie in Scotland
Baron Grey de Radcliffe	1875	Egerton	extinct 18 January 1885	succeeded as Earl of Wilton in 1882
Baron Fermanagh	1876	Crichton	extant	also Earl of Erne
Baron Harlech	1876	Ormsby-Gore	extant	
Baron Alington	1876	Sturt	extinct 17 September 1940	
Baron Tollemache	1876	Tollemache	extant	
Baron Gerard	1876	Gerard	extant	
Baron Sackville	1876	Sackville-West	extant	
Baron Airey	1876	Airey	extinct 13 September 1881	
Baron Norton	1878	Adderley	extant	
Baron Shute	1880	Barrington	extinct 6 April 1990	also Viscount Barrington
Baroness Bolsover	1880	Cavendish-Bentinck	extinct 30 July 1990	also Duke of Portland from 1893
Baron Haldon	1880	Palk	extinct 11 January 1939	
Baron Wimborne	1880	Guest	extant	created Viscount Wimborne on 15 June 1918
Baron Ardilaun	1880	Guinness	extinct 20 January 1915	
Baron Lamington	1880	Cochrane Wishart Baillie	extinct 20 September 1951	
Baron Donington	1880	Abney Hastings	extinct 31 May 1927	
Baron Trevor	1880	Hill-Trevor	extant	
Baron Rowton	1880	Lowry Corry	extinct 9 November 1903	
Baron Mount Temple	1880	Cowper-Temple	extinct 17 October 1888	
Baron Brabourne	1880	Knatchbull-Hugessen	extant	also Earl Mountbatten of Burma from 2017
Baron Ampthill	1881	Russell	extant	
Baron Arklow	1881	Wettin	suspended 1919	subsidiary title of the Duke of Albany
Baron Tweeddale	1881	Hay	extant	also Marquess of Tweeddale
Baron Howth	1881	St Lawrence	extinct 9 March 1909	also Earl of Howth
Baron Reay	1881	Mackay	extinct 1 August 1921	also Lord Reay
Baron Derwent	1881	Van den Bempde-Johnstone	extant	
Baron Hothfield	1881	Tufton	extant	
Baron Tweedmouth	1881	Marjoribanks	extinct 23 April 1935	
Baron Bramwell	1882	Bramwell	extinct 9 May 1892	
Baron Alcester	1882	Seymour	extinct 30 March 1895	
Baron Wolseley	1882	Wolseley	extinct 25 March 1913	created Viscount Wolseley on 28 September 1885
Baron Tennyson	1884	Tennyson	extant	
Baron Strathspey	1884	Ogilvie Grant	extant	also Earl of Seafield in Scotland until 1915
Baron Monk Bretton	1884	Dodson	extant	
Baron Northbourne	1884	James	extant	
Baron Sudley	1884	Gore	extant	also Earl of Arran in Ireland
Baron de Vesci	1884	Vesey	extinct 6 July 1903	also Viscount de Vesci in Ireland
Baron Herries	1884	Constable Maxwell	extinct 5 October 1908	also Lord Herries in Scotland
Baron Halsbury	1885	Giffard	extinct 31 December 2010	created Earl of Halsbury on 19 January 1898
Baron Powerscourt	1885	Wingfield	extant	also Viscount Powerscourt
Baron Northington	1885	Henley	extant	also Baron Henley in Ireland
Baron Rothschild	1885	Rothschild	extant	
Baron Revelstoke	1885	Baring	extant	
Baron Monkswell	1885	Collier	extant	
Baron Hobhouse	1885	Hobhouse	extinct 6 December 1904	
Baron Lingen	1885	Lingen	extinct 22 July 1905	
Baron Ashbourne	1885	Gibson	extant	
Baron Saint Oswald	1885	Winn	extant	
Baron Wantage	1885	Loyd-Lindsay	extinct 10 June 1901	
Baron Esher	1885	Brett	extant	created Viscount Esher on 11 November 1897
Baron Deramore	1885	Bateson	extinct 20 August 2006	
Baron Montagu of Beaulieu	1885	Montagu-Douglas-Scott	extant	
Baron Elphinstone	1885	Elphinstone	extant	also Lord Elphinstone in Scotland
Baron Colville of Culross	1885	Colville	extant	also Lord Colville of Culross in Scotland; created Viscount Colville of Culross on 12 July 1902
Baron Herschell	1886	Herschell	extinct 26 October 2008	
Baron Hillingdon	1886	Mills	extinct 1 September 1982	
Baron Hindlip	1886	Allsopp	extant	
Baron Grimthorpe	1886	Beckett	extant	
Baron Stalbridge	1886	Grosvenor	extinct 24 December 1949	
Baron Kensington	1886	Edwardes	extant	also Baron Kensington in Ireland
Baron Farnborough	1886	May	extinct 17 May 1886	
Baron Burton	1886	Bass	extinct 1 February 1909	created Baron Burton on 29 November 1897
Baron Hamilton of Dalzell	1886	Hamilton	extant	
Baron Brassey	1886	Brassey	extinct 12 November 1919	created Earl Brassey on 5 July 1911
Baron Thring	1886	Thring	extinct 4 February 1907	
Baron Stanley of Preston	1886	Stanley	extant	succeeded as Earl of Derby in 1893
Baron Connemara	1887	Bourke	extinct 1902	
Baron Bowes	1887	Bowes Lyon	extant	also Earl of Strathmore and Kinghorne
Baron Monckton	1887	Monckton-Arundell	extinct 1971	also Viscount Galway in Ireland
Baron Saint Levan	1887	St Aubyn	extant	
Baron Magheramorne	1887	McGarel-Hogg	extinct 1957	
Baron Armstrong	1887	Armstrong	extinct 1900	
Baron Basing	1887	Sclater-Booth	extant	
Baron de Ramsey	1887	Fellowes	extant	
Baron Cheylesmore	1887	Eaton	extinct 1974	
Baron Addington	1887	Hubbard	extant	
Baron Knutsford	1888	Holland	extant	created Viscount Knutsford on 3 August 1895
Baron Savile	1888	Savile	extant	
Baron Field	1890	Field	extinct 23 January 1907	
Baron Sandford	1891	Sandford	extinct 31 December 1893	
Baron Iveagh	1891	Guinness	extant	created Viscount Iveagh on 18 December 1905 and Earl of Iveagh on 30 September 1919
Baron Mount Stephen	1891	Stephen	extinct 29 November 1921	
Baron Masham	1891	Cunliffe Lister	extinct 4 January 1924	
Baroness Macdonald of Earnscliffe	1891	Macdonald	extinct 5 September 1920	
Baron Roberts of Kandahar	1892	Roberts	extinct 14 November 1914	created Earl Roberts on 11 February 1901
Baron Hood of Avalon	1892	Hood	extinct 15 November 1901	
Baron Kelvin	1892	Thomson	extinct 17 December 1907	
Baron Killarney	1892	Wettin	merged in Crown 6 May 1910	subsidiary title of the Duke of York; became Duke of Cornwall in England and Duke of Rothesay and Earl of Carrick in Scotland on 22 January 1901; created Prince of Wales and Earl of Chester on 9 November 1901
Baron Rookwood	1892	Ibbetson	extinct 15 January 1902	
Baron Cromer	1892	Baring	extant	created Viscount Cromer on 25 January 1899 and Earl of Cromer on 6 August 1901
Baron Shand	1892	Shand	extinct 6 March 1904	
Baron Medway	1892	Gathorne-Hardy	extant	subsidiary title of the Earl of Cranbrook
Baron Ashcombe	1892	Cubitt	extant	
Baron Knightley	1892	Knightley	extinct 19 December 1895	
Baron Blythswood	1892	Campbell	extinct 14 September 1940	
Baron Crawshaw	1892	Brooks	extant	
Baron Amherst of Hackney	1892	Tyssen Amherst	extant	
Baron Newton	1892	Legh	extant	
Baron Dunleath	1892	Mulholland	extant	
Baron Llangattock	1892	Rolls	extinct 31 October 1916	
Baron Playfair	1892	Playfair	extinct 26 December 1939	
Baron Battersea	1892	Flower	extinct 27 November 1907	
Baron Swansea	1893	Vivian	extant	
Baron Farrer	1893	Farrer	extinct 16 December 1964	
Baron Overtoun	1893	White	extinct 15 February 1908	
Baron Hawkesbury	1893	Foljambe	extant	created Earl of Liverpool on 22 December 1905
Baron Kelhead	1893	Douglas	extinct 19 October 1894	
Baron Stanmore	1893	Hamilton-Gordon	extinct 13 April 1957	
Baron Rendel	1894	Rendel	extinct 4 June 1913	
Baron Welby	1894	Welby	extinct 29 October 1915	
Baron Loch	1895	Loch	extinct 24 June 1991	
Baron Wandsworth	1895	Stern	extinct 10 February 1912	
Baron Ashton	1895	Williamson	extinct 27 May 1930	
Baron Burghclere	1895	Gardner	extinct 6 May 1921	
Baron James of Hereford	1895	James	extinct 18 August 1911	
Baron Rathmore	1895	Plunket	extinct 22 August 1919	
Baron Pirbright	1895	de Worms	extinct 9 January 1903	
Baron Glenesk	1895	Borthwick	extinct 24 November 1908	
Baron Leighton	1896	Leighton	extinct 25 January 1896	
Baron Aldenham	1896	Gibbs	extant	
Baron Heneage	1896	Heneage	extinct 19 February 1967	
Baron Malcolm of Poltalloch	1896	Malcolm	extinct 6 March 1902	
Baron Roos	1896	Manners	extant	also Duke of Rutland
Baron Rosmead	1896	Robinson	extinct 26 May 1933	
Baron Kinnear	1897	Kinnear	extinct 20 December 1917	
Baron Lister	1897	Lister	extinct 10 February 1912	
Baron Fairlie	1897	Boyle	extant	also Earl of Glasgow
Baron Dawnay	1897	Dawnay	extant	also Viscount Downe
Baron Ludlow	1897	Lopes	extinct 8 November 1922	
Baron HolmPatrick	1897	Hamilton	extant	
Baron Inverclyde	1897	Burns	extinct 17 June 1957	
Baron Strathcona and Mount Royal	1897	Smith	extinct 21 January 1914	created Baron Strathcona and Mount Royal on 26 June 1900
Baron Burton	1897	Bass	extant	also Baron Burton, which title became extinct on 1 February 1909
Baron Newlands	1898	Hozier	extinct 5 September 1929	
Baron Farquhar	1898	Townsend-Farquhar	extinct 30 August 1923	created Viscount Farquhar on 21 June 1917 and Earl Farquhar on 30 November 1922
Baron Muncaster	1898	Pennington	extinct 30 March 1917	also Baron Muncaster in Ireland
Baron Haliburton	1898	Haliburton	extinct 21 April 1907	
Baron Kitchener of Khartoum	1898	Kitchener	extinct 5 June 1916	created Viscount Kitchener of Khartoum on 11 July 1902 and Earl Kitchener on 27 July 1914
Baron Currie	1899	Currie	extinct 12 May 1906	
Baron Glanusk	1899	Bailey	extant	
Baron Brampton	1899	Hawkins	extinct 6 October 1907	
Baron Cranworth	1899	Gurdon	extant	
Baroness Dorchester	1899	Carleton	extinct 20 January 1963	
Baron Pauncefote	1899	Pauncefote	extinct 24 May 1902	
Baron Northcote	1900	Northcote	extinct 29 September 1911	
Baron Avebury	1900	Lubbock	extant	
Baron Killanin	1900	Morris	extant	also Baron Morris for life
Baron O'Brien	1900	O'Brien	extinct 7 September 1914	
Baron Alverstone	1900	Webster	extinct 15 December 1915	created Viscount Alverstone on 24 November 1913
Baron Strathcona and Mount Royal	1900	Smith	extant	also Baron Strathcona and Mount Royal, which title became extinct on 21 January 1914
Baron Wensleydale	1900	Ridley	extant	subsidiary title of Viscount Ridley

== Edward VII (1901–1910) ==
Title	Date of creation	Surname	Current status	Notes
Baron Milner	1901	Milner	extinct 13 May 1925	created Viscount Milner on 15 July 1902
Baron Barrymore	1902	Smith-Barry	extinct 22 February 1925	
Baron Kinross	1902	Balfour	extant	
Baron Shuttleworth	1902	Kay-Shuttleworth	extant	
Baron Allerton	1902	Jackson	extinct 1 July 1991	
Baron Grenfell	1902	Grenfell	extant	created Baron Grenfell of Kilvey for life on 17 April 2000
Baron Knollys	1902	Knollys	extant	created Viscount Knollys on 4 July 1911
Baron Redesdale	1902	Freeman-Mitford	extant	created Baron Mitford for life on 18 April 2000
Baron Burnham	1903	Levy-Lawson	extant	created Viscount Burnham on 16 May 1919, which title became extinct on 20 July 1933
Baron Biddulph	1903	Biddulph	extant	
Baron Estcourt	1903	Sotheron-Estcourt	extinct 12 January 1915	
Baron Armstrong	1903	Watson-Armstrong	extinct 1 October 1987	
Baron St Helier	1905	Jeune	extinct 9 April 1905	
Baron Dunedin	1905	Murray	extinct 21 August 1942	created Viscount Dunedin on 17 February 1926
Baron Leith of Fyvie	1905	Forbes-Leith	extinct 14 November 1925	
Baron Sanderson	1905	Sanderson	extinct 21 March 1923	
Baron Ritchie of Dundee	1905	Ritchie	extant	
Baron Waleran	1905	Walrond	extinct 4 April 1966	
Baron Knaresborough	1905	Meysey-Thompson	extinct 3 March 1929	
Baron Northcliffe	1905	Harmsworth	extinct 14 August 1922	created Viscount Northcliffe on 14 January 1918
Baron Michelham	1905	Stern	extinct 29 March 1984	
Baron Faber	1905	Faber	extinct 17 September 1920	
Baron Desborough	1905	Grenfell	extinct 9 January 1945	
Baron Loreburn	1906	Reid	extinct 30 November 1923	created Earl Loreburn on 4 July 1911
Baron Fitzmaurice	1906	Fitzmaurice	extinct 21 June 1935	
Baron Weardale	1906	Stanhope	extinct 1 March 1923	
Baron Haversham	1906	Hayter	extinct 10 May 1917	
Baron Hemphill	1906	Hemphill	extant	
Baron Joicey	1906	Joicey	extant	
Baron Nunburnholme	1906	Wilson	extant	
Baron Winterstoke	1906	Wills	extinct 29 January 1911	
Baron Colebrooke	1906	Colebrooke	extinct 28 February 1939	
Baron Courtney of Penwith	1906	Courtney	extinct 11 May 1918	
Baron Eversley	1906	Shaw-Lefevre	extinct 19 April 1928	
Baron Pirrie	1906	Pirrie	extinct 6 June 1924	created Viscount Pirrie on 9 July 1921
Baron Glantawe	1906	Jenkins	extinct 27 July 1915	
Baron Armitstead	1906	Armitstead	extinct 7 December 1915	
Baron Allendale	1906	Beaumont	extant	created Viscount Allendale on 5 July 1911
Baron Airedale	1907	Kitson	extinct 19 March 1996	
Baron Swaythling	1907	Samuel-Montagu	extant	
Baron Blyth	1907	Blyth	extant	
Baron Peckover	1907	Peckover	extinct 21 October 1919	
Baron Lochee	1908	Robertson	extinct 13 September 1911	
Baron MacDonnell	1908	MacDonnell	extinct 9 June 1925	
Baron Marchamley	1908	Whiteley	extant	
Baron Holden	1908	Holden	extinct 6 July 1951	
Baron St Davids	1908	Philipps	extant	created Viscount St Davids on 17 June 1918
Baron Pentland	1909	Sinclair	extinct 14 February 1984	
Baron Gorell	1909	Barnes	extant	
Baron Desart	1909	Cuffe	extinct 4 November 1934	also Earl of Desart in Ireland
Baron Fisher	1909	Fisher	extant	
Baron Kilbracken	1909	Godley	extant	
Baron Ashby St Ledgers	1910	Guest	extant	succeeded as Baron Wimborne in 1914; created Viscount Wimborne in 1918
Baron Mersey	1910	Bigham	extant	created Viscount Mersey on 22 January 1916
Baron Islington	1910	Dickson-Poynder	extinct 6 December 1936	

== George V (1910–1936) ==
Title	Date of creation	Surname	Current status	Notes
Baron Southwark	1910	Causton	extinct 23 February 1929	
Baron Ilkeston	1910	Foster	extinct 4 January 1952	
Baron Devonport	1910	Kearley	extant	created Viscount Devonport on 22 June 1917
Baron Cowdray	1910	Pearson	extant	created Viscount Cowdray on 2 January 1917
Baron Rotherham	1910	Holland	extinct 24 January 1950	
Baron Furness	1910	Furness	extinct 1 May 1995	created Viscount Furness on 16 January 1918
Baron Willingdon	1910	Freeman-Thomas	extinct 19 March 1979	created Viscount Willingdon on 23 June 1924, Earl of Willingdon on 20 February 1931 and Marquess of Willingdon on 26 May 1936
Baron Hardinge of Penshurst	1910	Hardinge	extant	
Baron de Villiers	1910	de Villiers	extant	
Baron Glenconner	1911	Tennant	extant	
Baron Mountgarret	1911	Butler	extant	also Viscount Mountgarret and Baron Kells in Ireland
Baron Aberconway	1911	McLaren	extant	
Baron St Audries	1911	Fuller-Acland-Hood	extinct 16 October 1971	
Baron Stamfordham	1911	Bigge	extinct 31 March 1931	
Baron Merthyr	1911	Lewis	extant	
Baron Inchcape	1911	Mackay	extant	created Viscount Inchcape on 21 January 1924 and Earl of Inchcape on 20 June 1929
Baron Rowallan	1911	Corbett	extant	
Baron Ashton of Hyde	1911	Ashton	extant	
Baron Charnwood	1911	Benson	extinct 1 February 1955	
Baron Epsom	1911	Primrose	extant	subsidiary title of the Earl of Midlothian; also Earl of Rosebery
Baron Douglas of Baads	1911	Akers-Douglas	extant	subsidiary title of the Viscount Chilston
Baron Ravensdale	1911	Curzon	extant	subsidiary title of the Earl Curzon of Kedleston, created Viscount Scarsdale at the same time, also Baron Curzon of Kedleston in Ireland, created Marquess Curzon of Kedleston and Earl of Kedleston on 28 June 1921, which titles all extinct 20 March 1925, except Viscount Scarsdale, from which this title was separated, created Baroness Ravensdale of Kedleston for life on 6 October 1958, which title extinct 9 February 1966
Baron Emmott	1911	Emmott	extinct 13 December 1926	
Baron Strachie	1911	Strachey	extinct 17 May 1973	
Baron Carmichael	1912	Gibson-Carmichael	extinct 16 January 1926	
Baron Pontypridd	1912	Thomas	extinct 14 December 1927	
Baron Hollenden	1912	Morley	extant	
Baron Butler of Mount Juliet	1912	Butler	extant	also Earl of Carrick in Ireland
Baron Channing of Wellingborough	1912	Channing	extinct 20 February 1926	
Baron Nicholson	1912	Nicholson	extinct 13 September 1918	
Baron Murray of Elibank	1912	Murray	extinct 13 September 1920	
Baron Whitburgh	1912	Borthwick	extinct 29 September 1967	
Baron Sydenham of Combe	1913	Clarke	extinct 7 February 1933	
Baron Rochdale	1913	Kemp	extant	created Viscount Rochdale on 20 January 1960
Baron Reading	1914	Isaacs	extant	created Viscount Reading on 26 June 1916, Earl of Reading on 20 December 1917 and Marquess of Reading on 7 May 1926
Baron Strathclyde	1914	Ure	extinct 2 October 1928	
Baron Rothermere	1914	Harmsworth	extant	created Viscount Rothermere on 17 May 1919
Baron Parmoor	1914	Cripps	extant	
Baron Cozens-Hardy	1914	Cozens-Hardy	extinct 11 September 1975	
Baron D'Abernon	1914	Vincent	extinct 1 November 1941	created Viscount D'Abernon on 20 February 1926
Baron Ranksborough	1914	Brocklehurst	extinct 28 February 1921	
Baron Lyell	1914	Lyell	extinct 11 January 2017	
Baron Denton	1914	Kitchener	extinct 16 December 2011	subsidiary title of the Earl Kitchener
Baron Cunliffe	1914	Cunliffe	extant	
Baron Wrenbury	12 April 1915	Buckley	extant	
Baron Buckmaster	14 June 1915	Buckmaster	extant	created Viscount Buckmaster on 24 February 1933
Baron Bertie of Thame	28 June 1915	Bertie	extinct 29 August 1954	created Viscount Bertie of Thame on 2 September 1918
Baron Muir-Mackenzie	29 June 1915	Muir Mackenzie	extinct 22 May 1930	
Baron Beresford	1916	Beresford	extinct 6 September 1919	
Baron Faringdon	1916	Henderson	extant	
Baron Shaughnessy	1916	Shaughnessy	extant	
Baron Astor	1916	Astor	extant	created Viscount Astor on 23 June 1917
Baron Rathcreedan	1916	Norton	extant	
Baron Rhondda	1916	Thomas	extinct 3 July 1918	created Viscount Rhondda on 19 June 1918
Baron Somerleyton	1916	Crossley	extant	
Baron Carnock	1916	Nicolson	extant	
Baron Anslow	1916	Mosley	extinct 20 August 1933	
Baron Glentanar	1916	Coats	extinct 28 June 1971	
Baron Roundway	1916	Colston	extinct 29 March 1944	
Baron Finlay	1916	Finlay	extinct 30 June 1945	created Viscount Finlay on 27 March 1919
Baron Stuart of Wortley	1917	Stuart-Wortley	extinct 24 April 1926	
Baron Beaverbrook	1917	Aitken	extant	
Baron Nuneham	1917	Harcourt	extinct 3 January 1979	Viscount Harcourt
Baron Gainford	1917	Pease	extant	
Baron Forteviot	1917	Dewar	extant	
Baron Roe	1917	Roe	extinct 7 June 1923	
Baron Doverdale	1917	Partington	extinct 18 January 1949	
Baron Atholstan	1917	Graham	extinct 28 January 1938	
Baron Annesley	1917	Annesley	extinct 6 October 1949	also Viscount Valentia in Ireland
Baron Lambourne	1917	Lockwood	extinct 26 December 1928	
Baron Treowen	1917	Herbert	extinct 18 October 1933	
Baron Leverhulme	1917	Lever	extinct 4 July 2000	created Viscount Leverhulme on 27 November 1922
Baron Colwyn	1917	Smith	extant	
Baron Gisborough	1917	Chaloner	extant	
Baron Southborough	1917	Hopwood	extinct 15 June 1992	
Baron Morris	1918	Morris	extant	
Baron Cawley	1918	Cawley	extant	
Baron Armaghdale	1918	Lonsdale	extinct 8 June 1924	
Baron Queenborough	1918	Paget	extinct 22 September 1949	
Baron Terrington	1918	Woodhouse	extant	
Baron Weir	1918	Weir	extant	created Viscount Weir on 25 June 1938
Baron Glenarthur	1918	Arthur	extant	
Baron Glanely	1918	Tatem	extinct 28 June 1942	
Baron Wittenham	1918	Faber	extinct 1 February 1931	
Baron Shandon	1918	O'Brien	extinct 10 September 1930	
Baron Phillimore	1918	Phillimore	extant	
Baron Lee of Fareham	1918	Lee	extinct 21 July 1947	created Viscount Lee of Fareham on 28 November 1922
Baron Bledisloe	1918	Bathurst	extant	created Viscount Bledisloe on 24 June 1935
Baron Sterndale	1918	Pickford	extinct 17 August 1923	
Baron Downham	1918	Fisher	extinct 2 July 1920	
Baron Birkenhead	1919	Smith	extinct 18 February 1985	created Viscount Birkenhead on 15 June 1921 and Earl of Birkenhead on 28 November 1922
Baron Ernle	1919	Prothero	extinct 1 July 1937	
Baron Inverforth	1919	Weir	extant	
Baron Sinha	1919	Sinha	extant	
Baron Askwith	1919	Askwith	extinct 2 June 1942	
Baron Chalmers	1919	Chalmers	extinct 17 November 1938	
Baron Cochrane of Cults	1919	Cochrane	extant	
Baron Wyfold	1919	Hermon-Hodge	extinct 8 April 1999	
Baron Clwyd	1919	Roberts	extant	
Baron Dewar	1919	Dewar	extinct 11 April 1930	
Baron Beatty	1919	Beatty	extant	subsidiary title of the Earl Beatty
Baron Haig	1919	Haig	extant	subsidiary title of the Earl Haig
Baron Plumer	1919	Plumer	extinct 24 February 1944	created Viscount Plumer on 24 June 1929
Baron Byng of Vimy	1919	Byng	extinct 6 June 1935	created Viscount Byng of Vimy on 12 January 1928
Baron Horne	1919	Horne	extinct 14 August 1929	
Baron Russell of Liverpool	1919	Russell	extant	
Baron Rawlinson	1919	Rawlinson	extinct 28 March 1925	
Baron Wavertree	1919	Walker	extinct 2 February 1933	
Baron Ruthven of Gowrie	1919	Hore-Ruthven	extant	also Earl of Gowrie since 1956
Baron Swinfen	1919	Eady	extant	
Baron Wester Wemyss	1919	Wemyss	extinct 24 May 1933	
Baron Meston	1919	Meston	extant	
Baron Forster	1919	Forster	extinct 15 January 1936	
Baron Ashfield	1920	Stanley	extinct 4 November 1948	
Baron Riddell	1920	Riddell	extinct 5 December 1934	
Baron Dawson of Penn	1920	Dawson	extinct 7 March 1945	created Viscount Dawson of Penn on 30 October 1936
Baron Cullen of Ashbourne	1920	Cokayne	extant	
Baron Killarney	1920	Windsor	merged in Crown 1936	subsidiary title of the Duke of York
Baron Marshall of Chipstead	1921	Marshall	extinct 1936	
Baron Invernairn	1921	Beardmore	extinct 1936	
Baron Cable	1921	Cable	extinct 1927	
Baron Ystwyth	1921	Vaughan-Davies	extinct 1935	
Baron Seaforth	1921	Stewart-Mackenzie	extinct 1923	
Baron Illingworth	1921	Illingworth	extinct 1942	
Baron Bearsted	1921	Samuel	extant	created Viscount Bearsted in 1925
Baron Dalziel of Kirkcaldy	1921	Dalziel	extinct 1935	
Baron Ailwyn	1921	Fellowes	extinct 1988	
Baron Glenavy	1921	Campbell	extinct 1 June 1984	
Baron Trevethin	1921	Lawrence	extant	
Baron Glendyne	1922	Nivison	extant	
Baron Woolavington	1922	Buchanan	extinct 9 August 1935	
Baron Manton	1922	Watson	extant	
Baron Barnby	1922	Willey	extinct 30 April 1982	
Baron Hewart	1922	Hewart	extinct 23 July 1964	created Viscount Hewart on 28 October 1940
Baron Forres	1922	Williamson	extant	
Baron Vestey	1922	Vestey	extant	
Baron Waring	1922	Waring	extinct 9 January 1940	
Baron Borwick	1922	Borwick	extant	
Baron Mildmay of Flete	1922	Mildmay	extinct 12 May 1950	
Baron Maclay	1922	Maclay	extant	
Baron Wargrave	1922	Goulding	extinct 17 July 1936	
Baron Bethell	1922	Bethell	extant	
Baron Daryngton	1923	Pease	extinct 5 April 1994	
Baron Kylsant	1923	Philipps	extinct 5 June 1937	
Baron Lawrence of Kingsgate	1923	Lawrence	extinct 17 December 1927	
Baron Hunsdon of Hunsdon	1923	Gibbs	extant	also Baron Aldenham from 1939
Baron Jessel	1924	Jessel	extinct 13 June 1990	
Baron Darling	1924	Darling	extant	
Baron Banbury of Southam	1924	Banbury	extant	
Baron Olivier	1924	Olivier	extinct 15 February 1943	
Baron Thomson	1924	Thomson	extinct 5 October 1930	
Baron Arnold	1924	Arnold	extinct 3 August 1945	
Baron Danesfort	21 February 1924	Butcher	extinct 30 June 1935	
Baron Stevenson	7 May 1924	Stevenson	extinct 10 June 1926	
Baron Merrivale	19 January 1925	Duke	extant	
Baron Bradbury	28 January 1925	Bradbury	extant	
Baron Stonehaven	12 June 1925	Baird	extant	created Viscount Stonehaven on 27 June 1938
Baron Lloyd	16 November 1925	Lloyd	extinct 5 November 1985	
Baron Irwin	22 December 1925	Wood	extant	also Viscount Halifax from 19 January 1934; created Earl of Halifax on 11 July 1944
Baron Mereworth	19 January 1926	Browne	extant	also Baron Oranmore and Browne in Ireland
Baron Hanworth	28 January 1926	Pollock	extant	created Viscount Hanworth on 17 January 1936
Baron Buckland	16 July 1926	Berry	extinct 23 May 1928	
Baron Warrington of Clyffe	25 October 1926	Warrington	extinct 26 October 1937	
Baron Greenway	18 January 1927	Greenway	extant	
Baron Hayter	29 January 1927	Chubb	extant	
Baron Cornwallis	31 January 1927	Cornwallis	extant	
Baron Daresbury	21 June 1927	Greenall	extant	
Baron Dalziel of Wooler	4 July 1927	Dalziel	extinct 18 April 1928	
Baron Cushendun	7 November 1927	McNeill	extinct 12 October 1934	
Baron Wraxall	11 January 1928	Gibbs	extant	
Baron Strickland	19 January 1928	Strickland	extinct 22 August 1940	
Baron Lugard	21 March 1928	Lugard	extinct 11 April 1945	
Baron Culloden	30 March 1928	Windsor	extant	subsidiary title of the Duke of Gloucester
Baron Hailsham	5 April 1928	Hogg	extant	created Viscount Hailsham on 4 July 1929
Baron Melchett	15 June 1928	Mond	extinct 29 August 2018	
Baron Remnant	26 June 1928	Remnant	extant	
Baron Ebbisham	5 July 1928	Blades	extinct 12 April 1991	
Baron Davidson of Lambeth	14 November 1928	Davidson	extinct 25 May 1930	
Baron Trent	18 March 1929	Boot	extinct 8 March 1956	
Baron Moynihan	19 March 1929	Moynihan	extant	
Baron Fairhaven	20 March 1929	Broughton	extinct 20 August 1966	created Baron Fairhaven on 25 July 1961
Baron Craigmyle	7 May 1929	Shaw	extant	also Baron Shaw for life, which title became extinct on 28 June 1937
Baron Brotherton	17 June 1929	Brotherton	extinct 21 October 1930	
Baron Bayford	18 June 1929	Sanders	extinct 24 February 1940	
Baron Camrose	19 June 1929	Berry	extant	created Viscount Camrose on 20 January 1941
Baron Sankey	21 June 1929	Sankey	extinct 6 February 1948	created Viscount Sankey on 30 January 1932
Baron Passfield	22 June 1929	Webb	extinct 13 October 1947	
Baron Dulverton	8 July 1929	Wills	extant	
Baron Alvingham	10 July 1929	Yerburgh	extant	
Baron Marks	16 July 1929	Marks	extinct 24 September 1938	
Baron Luke	9 July 1929	Lawson-Johnston	extant	
Baron Amulree	22 July 1929	Mackenzie	extinct 15 December 1983	
Baron Tyrrell	24 July 1929	Tyrrell	extinct 14 March 1947	
Baron Greenwood	31 October 1929	Greenwood	extinct 7 July 2003	created Viscount Greenwood on 16 February 1937
Baron Baden-Powell	17 September 1929	Baden-Powell	extant	
Baron Marley	16 January 1930	Aman	extinct 13 March 1990	
Baron Ponsonby of Shulbrede	17 January 1930	Ponsonby	extant	created Baron Ponsonby of Roehampton for life on 19 April 2000
Baron Dickinson	18 January 1930	Dickinson	extant	
Baron Wakefield	20 January 1930	Wakefield	extinct 15 January 1941	created Viscount Wakefield on 28 June 1934
Baron Kirkley	21 January 1930	Noble	extinct 11 September 1935	
Baron Trenchard	23 January 1930	Trenchard	extant	created Viscount Trenchard on 31 January 1936
Baron Noel-Buxton	17 June 1930	Buxton	extant	
Baron Sanderson	18 June 1930	Furniss	extinct 25 March 1939	
Baron Howard of Penrith	10 July 1930	Howard	extant	
Baron Plender	20 January 1931	Plender	extinct 19 January 1946	
Baron Hyndley	21 January 1931	Hindley	extinct 5 January 1963	created Viscount Hyndley on 2 February 1948
Baron Rutherford of Nelson	22 January 1931	Rutherford	extinct 19 October 1937	
Baron Rochester	23 January 1931	Lamb	extant	
Baron Snell	23 March 1931	Snell	extinct 21 April 1944	
Baron Mamhead	5 December 1931	Newman	extinct 2 November 1945	
Baron Conway of Allington	7 December 1931	Conway	extinct 19 April 1937	
Baron Mount Temple	13 January 1932	Ashley	extinct 3 July 1939	
Baron Selsdon	14 January 1932	Mitchell-Thomson	extant	
Baron Allen of Hurtwood	18 January 1932	Allen	extinct 3 March 1939	
Baron Moyne	21 January 1932	Guinness	extant	
Baron Rhayader	25 January 1932	Jones	extinct 26 September 1939	
Baron Woodbridge	17 June 1932	Churchman	extinct 3 February 1949	
Baron Essendon	20 June 1932	Lewis	extinct 18 July 1978	
Baron Davies	21 June 1932	Davies	extant	
Baron Gladstone of Hawarden	22 Jn 1932	Gladstone	extinct 28 April 1935	
Baron Rankeillour	28 June 1932	Hope	extant	
Baron Hutchison of Montrose	30 June 1932	Hutchison	extinct 13 June 1950	
Baron Runciman	17 January 1933	Runciman	extant	Heir created Viscount Runciman of Doxford on 10 June 1937 and Barony subsequently merged
Baron Brocket	19 January 1933	Nall-Cain	extant	
Baron Horder	23 January 1933	Horder	extinct 2 July 1997	
Baron Milne	26 January 1933	Milne	extant	
Baron Duveen	3 February 1933	Duveen	extinct 25 May 1939	
Baron Rennell	1 March 1933	Rodd	extant	
Baron Mottistone	21 June 1933	Seely	extant	
Baron Iliffe	22 June 1933	Iliffe	extant	
Baron Palmer	24 June 1933	Palmer	extant	
Baron Bingley	24 July 1933	Lane-Fox	extinct 11 December 1947	
Baron Rockley	11 January 1934	Cecil	extant	
Baron Portsea	12 January 1934	Falle	extinct 1 November 1948	
Baron Nuffield	13 January 1934	Morris	extinct 22 August 1963	created Viscount Nuffield on 24 January 1938
Baron Eltisley	15 January 1934	Newton	extinct 2 September 1942	
Baron Elton	16 January 1934	Elton	extant	
Baron Bingham	26 June 1934	Bingham	extant	also Earl of Lucan and Baron Lucan in Ireland
Baron Alness	27 July 1934	Munro	extinct 6 October 1955	
Baron Hirst	28 June 1934	Hirst	extinct 22 January 1943	
Baron Wakehurst	29 June 1934	Loder	extant	
Baron Downpatrick	9 October 1934	Windsor	extant	subsidiary title of the Duke of Kent
Baron Rushcliffe	24 January 1935	Betterton	extinct 18 November 1949	
Baron Hesketh	25 January 1935	Fermor-Hesketh	extant	
Baron Portal	26 January 1935	Portal	extinct 6 May 1949	created Viscount Portal on 1 February 1945
Baron Tweedsmuir	1 June 1935	Buchan	extant	
Baron Sysonby	24 June 1935	Ponsonby	extinct 23 October 2009	
Baron Wigram	25 June 1935	Wigram	extant	
Baron Blackford	26 June 1935	Mason	extinct 15 May 1988	
Baron Riverdale	27 June 1935	Balfour	extant	
Baron May	28 June 1935	May	extant	
Baron St Just	29 June 1935	Grenfell	extinct 14 October 1984	
Baron Kennet	15 July 1935	Young	extant	
Baron Gowrie	20 December 1935	Hore-Ruthven	extant	created Earl of Gowrie on 8 January 1945
Baron Strathcarron	11 January 1936	Macpherson	extant	

== Edward VIII (1936) ==
Title	Date of creation	Surname	Current status	Notes
Baron Glenravel	1 February 1936	Benn	extinct 1937	
Baron Kemsley	3 February 1936	Berry	extant	created Viscount Kemsley in 1945
Baron Catto	24 February 1936	Catto	extant	
Baron Cautley	14 July 1936	Cautley	extinct 1946	
Baron Hailey	15 July 1936	Hailey	extinct 1969	
Baron Austin	16 July 1936	Austin	extinct 1941	
Baron Wardington	17 July 1936	Pease	extinct 2019	

== George VI (1936–1952) ==
Title	Date of creation	Surname	Current status	Notes
Baron Windlesham	22 February 1937	Hennessy	extant	created Baron Hennessy for life in 1999
Baron Mancroft	23 February 1937	Samuel	extant	
Baron McGowan	24 February 1937	McGowan	extant	
Baron Addison	22 May 1937	Addison	extant	created Viscount Addison in 1945
Baron Denham	24 May 1937	Bowyer	extant	
Baron Rea	3 June 1937	Rea	extant	
Baron Chatfield	4 June 1937	Chatfield	extinct 30 September 2007	
Baron Cadman	7 June 1937	Cadman	extant	
Baron Marchwood	8 June 1937	Penny	extant	created Viscount Marchwood on 13 September 1945
Baron Kenilworth	10 June 1937	Siddeley	extant	
Baron Southwood	11 June 1937	Elias	extinct 10 April 1946	created Viscount Southwood on 25 January 1946
Baron Pender	12 June 1937	Denison-Pender	extant	
Baron Roborough	24 January 1938	Lopes	extant	
Baron Birdwood	25 January 1938	Birdwood	extinct 11 July 2015	
Baron Brassey of Apethorpe	26 January 1938	Brassey	extant	
Baron Belstead	27 January 1938	Ganzoni	extinct 2005	created Baron Ganzoni for life in 1999
Baron Perry	28 January 1938	Perry	extinct 17 June 1956	
Baron Stamp	28 June 1938	Stamp	extant	
Baron Bicester	29 June 1938	Smith	extant	
Baron Fairfield	1 February 1939	Greer	extinct 1945	
Baron Milford	2 February 1939	Philipps	extant	
Baron Hankey	3 February 1939	Hankey	extant	
Baron Harmsworth	4 February 1939	Harmsworth	extant	
Baron Brooke of Oakley	4 July 1939	Brooke	extinct 1944	
Baron Rotherwick	5 July 1939	Cayzer	extant	
Baron Ennisdale	6 July 1939	Lyons	extinct 1963	
Baron Woolton	7 July 1939	Marquis	extant	created Viscount Woolton in 1953 and Earl of Woolton in 1956
Baron Glentoran	8 July 1939	Dixon	extant	
Baron Tryon	18 April 1940	Tryon	extant	
Baron Croft	28 May 1940	Croft	extant	
Baron Abertay	26 June 1940	Barrie	extinct 1940	
Baron Teviot	27 June 1940	Kerr	extant	
Baron Nathan	28 June 1940	Nathan	extant	
Baron Reith	21 October 1940	Reith	extant	
Baron Quickswood	25 January 1941	Gascoyne-Cecil	extinct 10 December 1956	
Baron Merriman	27 January 1941	Merriman	extinct 18 January 1962	
Baron Kindersley	28 January 1941	Kindersley	extant	
Baron Ironside	29 January 1941	Ironside	extant	
Baron Leathers	19 May 1941	Leathers	extant	created Viscount Leathers on 18 January 1954
Baron Vansittart	3 July 1941	Vansittart	extinct 14 February 1957	
Baron Cherwell	4 July 1941	Lindemann	extinct 3 July 1957	created Viscount Cherwell on 26 June 1956
Baron Greene	16 July 1941	Greene	extinct 16 April 1952	
Baron Soulbury	6 August 1941	Ramsbotham	extant	created Viscount Soulbury on 16 July 1954
Baron Sherwood	14 August 1941	Seely	extinct 1 April 1970	
Baron Latham	16 January 1942	Latham	extant	
Baron Wedgwood	21 January 1942	Wedgwood	extant	
Baron Geddes	28 January 1942	Geddes	extant	
Baron Winster	3 February 1942	Fletcher	extinct 7 June 1961	
Baron Clauson	20 February 1942	Clauson	extinct 15 March 1946	
Baron Bruntisfield	9 March 1942	Warrender	extant	
Baron Lang of Lambeth	2 April 1942	Lang	extinct 5 December 1945	
Baron Brabazon of Tara	27 April 1942	Moore-Brabazon	extant	
Baron Keynes	6 July 1942	Keynes	extinct 21 April 1946	
Baron Keyes	22 January 1943	Keyes	extant	
Baron Hemingford	1 February 1943	Herbert	extant	
Baron Moran	8 March 1943	Wilson	extant	
Baron Killearn	17 May 1943	Lampson	extant	
Baron Dowding	5 July 1943	Dowding	extant	
Baron Gretton	27 January 1944	Gretton	extant	
Baron Royden	28 January 1944	Royden	extinct 6 November 1950	
Baron Westwood	29 January 1944	Westwood	extant	
Baron Ammon	31 January 1944	Ammon	extinct 2 April 1960	
Baron Courtauld-Thomson	1 February 1944	Courtauld-Thomson	extinct 1 November 1954	
Baron Schuster	26 June 1944	Schuster	extinct 28 June 1956	
Baron Norman	13 October 1944	Norman	extinct 4 February 1950	
Baron Hazlerigg	12 February 1945	Hazlerigg	extant	
Baron Hacking	2 July 1945	Hacking	extant	
Baron Courthope	3 July 1945	Courthope	extinct 2 September 1955	
Baron Balfour of Inchrye	5 July 1945	Balfour	extinct 14 April 2013	
Baron Jackson	6 July 1945	Jackson	extinct 2 May 1954	
Baron Quibell	7 July 1945	Quibell	extinct 16 April 1962	
Baron Walkden	9 July 1945	Walkden	extinct 25 April 1951	
Baron Chetwode	10 July 1945	Chetwode	extant	
Baron Cope	11 July 1945	Cope	extinct 15 July 1946	
Baron Ramsden	12 July 1945	Ramsden	extinct 9 August 1955	
Baron Chattisham	13 July 1945	Brass	extinct 24 August 1945	
Baron Sandford	14 July 1945	Edmondson	extant	
Baron Altrincham	1 August 1945	Grigg	extant	
Baron Jowitt	2 August 1945	Jowitt	extinct 16 August 1957	created Viscount Jowitt on 20 January 1947 and Earl Jowitt on 24 December 1951
Baron Pethick-Lawrence	16 August 1945	Pethick-Lawrence	extinct 17 September 1961	
Baron Llewellin	12 September 1945	Llewellin	extinct 24 January 1957	
Baron Lyle of Westbourne	13 September 1945	Lyle	extinct 1 August 1976	
Baron Broadbridge	14 September 1945	Broadbridge	extant	
Baron Cunningham of Hyndhope	15 September 1945	Cunningham	extinct 12 June 1963	created Viscount Cunningham of Hyndhope on 26 January 1946
Baron Portal of Hungerford	17 September 1945	Portal	extinct 29 September 1990	created Viscount Portal of Hungerford on 28 January 1946, which title became extinct on 22 April 1971
Baron Alanbrooke	18 September 1945	Brooke	extinct 10 January 2018	created Viscount Alanbrooke on 29 January 1946
Baron Broughshane	19 September 1945	Davison	extinct 2006	
Baron Pakenham	12 October 1945	Pakenham	extant	succeeded as Earl of Longford in 1961
Baron Henderson	19 October 1945	Henderson	extinct 4 April 1984	
Baron Mountevans	12 November 1945	Evans	extant	
Baron Lindsay of Birker	13 November 1945	Lindsay	extant	
Baron Piercy	14 November 1945	Piercy	extant	
Baron Morrison	15 November 1945	Morrison	extinct 28 October 1997	
Baron Chorley	16 November 1945	Chorley	extant	
Baron Calverley	17 November 1945	Muff	extant	
Baron Rusholme	1 December 1945	Palmer	extinct 18 August 1977	
Baron Tedder	23 January 1946	Tedder	extant	
Baron Colgrain	28 January 1946	Campbell	extant	
Baron Inman	30 January 1946	Inman	extinct 26 August 1979	
Baron Tovey	11 February 1946	Tovey	extinct 12 January 1971	
Baron Darwen	12 February 1946	Davies	extant	
Baron Wilson	12 March 1946	Wilson	extinct 1 February 2009	
Baron Inverchapel	5 April 1946	Clark Kerr	extinct 5 July 1951	
Baron Beveridge	25 June 1946	Beveridge	extinct 16 March 1963	
Baron Uvedale of North End	26 June 1946	Woodall	extinct 28 February 1974	
Baron Lucas of Chilworth	27 June 1946	Lucas	extant	
Baron Shepherd	28 June 1946	Shepherd	extant	created Baron Shepherd of Spalding for life on 16 November 1999
Baron Citrine	16 July 1946	Citrine	extinct 5 August 2006	
Baron Brand	17 July 1946	Brand	extinct 23 August 1963	
Baron Newall	18 July 1946	Newall	extant	
Baron Fraser of North Cape	19 September 1946	Fraser	extinct 12 February 1981	
Baron Oaksey	13 January 1947	Lawrence	extant	
Baron Ismay	14 January 1947	Ismay	extinct 17 December 1965	
Baron Rugby	15 January 1947	Maffey	extant	
Baron Layton	16 January 1947	Layton	extant	
Baron Simon of Wythenshawe	17 January 1947	Simon	extant	
Baron Kershaw	20 January 1947	Kershaw	extant	
Baron Trefgarne	21 January 1947	Garro-Jones	extant	
Baron Dukeston	1 April 1947	Dukes	extinct 14 May 1948	
Baron Crook	3 July 1947	Crook	extant	
Baron Robinson	15 July 1947	Robinson	extinct 5 September 1952	
Baron Amwell	16 July 1947	Montague	extant	
Baron Milverton	9 October 1947	Richards	extant	
Baron Romsey	18 October 1947	Mountbatten	extant	subsidiary title of the Earl Mountbatten of Burma
Baron Greenwich	20 November 1947	Mountbatten	merged in Crown 8 September 2022	subsidiary title of the Duke of Edinburgh, created Earl of Merioneth at the same time
Baron Mackintosh of Halifax	6 February 1948	Mackintosh	extant	created Viscount Mackintosh of Halifax in 1957
Baron Douglas of Kirtleside	7 February 1948	Douglas	extinct 1969	
Baron Braintree	9 February 1948	Crittall	extinct 1961	
Baron Clydesmuir	26 February 1948	Colville	extant	
Baron Webb-Johnson	22 June 1948	Webb-Johnson	extinct 1958	
Baron Maenan	23 June 1948	Taylor	extinct 1951	
Baron Williams	24 June 1948	Williams	extinct 1966	
Baron Adams	16 February 1949	Adams	extinct 1960	
Baron Boyd-Orr	1949	9 Mar Boyd-Orr	extinct 25 June 1971	
Baron Macdonald of Gwaenysgor	13 April 1949	Macdonald	extinct 27 January 2002	
Baron Badeley	21 June 1949	Badeley	extinct 27 September 1951	
Baron Dugan of Victoria	7 July 1949	Dugan	extinct 17 August 1951	
Baron Archibald	12 July 1949	Archibald	extinct 27 February 1996	
Baron Wilmot of Selmeston	30 January 1950	Wilmot	extinct 22 July 1964	
Baron Bilsland	31 January 1950	Bilsland	extinct 10 December 1970	
Baron Burden	1 February 1950	Burden	extant	
Baron Haden-Guest	2 February 1950	Haden-Guest	extant	
Baron Henderson of Ardwick	3 February 1950	Henderson	extinct 26 February 1950	
Baron Lawson	17 March 1950	Lawson	extinct 3 August 1965	
Baron Douglas of Barloch	11 April 1950	Douglas	extinct 31 March 1980	
Baron Silkin	4 July 1950	Silkin	extant	
Baron Hurcomb	5 July 1950	Hurcomb	extinct 7 August 1975	
Baron Campion	6 July 1950	Campion	extinct 6 April 1958	
Baron Hives	7 July 1950	Hives	extant	
Baron Greenhill	8 July 1950	Greenhill	extinct 2020	
Baron Ogmore	10 July 1950	Rees-Williams	extant	
Baron Morris of Kenwood	11 July 1950	Morris	extant	
Baron Macpherson of Drumochter	25 January 1951	Macpherson	extant	
Baron Hungarton	7 February 1951	Crawford	extinct 14 June 1966	
Baron McEntee	26 June 1951	McEntee	extinct 11 February 1953	
Baron Kenswood	27 June 1951	Whitfield	extant	
Baron Freyberg	16 October 1951	Freyberg	extant	
Baron Milner of Leeds	20 December 1951	Milner	extant	
Baron Kirkwood	22 December 1951	Kirkwood	extant	
Baron Wise	24 December 1951	Wise	extant	
Baron Mathers	30 January 1952	Mathers	extinct 26 September 1965	
Baron Turnour	31 January 1952	Turnour	extinct 26 August 1962	also Earl Winterton

== Elizabeth II (1952–2022) ==
Title	Date of creation	Surname	Current status	Notes
Baron Rideau	11 March 1952	Alexander	extant	subsidiary title of the Earl Alexander of Tunis
Baron Simonds	24 June 1952	Simonds	extinct 28 June 1971	also Baron Simonds for life; created Viscount Simonds on 18 October 1954
Baron Jeffreys	12 July 1952	Jeffreys	extant	
Baron Rathcavan	11 February 1953	O'Neill	extant	
Baron Percy of Newcastle	12 February 1953	Percy	extinct 3 April 1958	
Baron Baillieu	13 February 1953	Baillieu	extant	
Baron Glyn	29 June 1953	Glyn	extinct 1 May 1960	
Baron Grantchester	30 June 1953	Suenson-Taylor	extant	
Baron Bennett of Edgbaston	1 July 1953	Bennett	extinct 29 September 1957	
Baron Salter	16 October 1953	Salter	extinct 1975	
Baron Hore-Belisha	14 January 1954	Hore-Belisha	extinct 1957	
Baron Strang	16 January 1954	Strang	extinct 19 December 2014	
Baron Dovercourt	18 January 1954	Holmes	extinct 1961	
Baron Moore	30 January 1954	Moore	extant	also Earl of Drogheda
Baron Coleraine	16 February 1954	Law	extant	
Baron Harvey of Tasburgh	3 July 1954	Harvey	extant	
Baron Glassary	30 July 1954	Scrymgeour-Wedderburn	extant	also Earl of Dundee
Baron Cooper of Culross	31 July 1954	Cooper	extinct 1955	
Baron Gridley	10 January 1955	Gridley	extant	
Baron Adrian	28 January 1955	Adrian	extinct 1995	
Baron Strathalmond	18 February 1955	Fraser	extant	
Baron Strathclyde	4 May 1955	Galbraith	extant	
Baron Masham	5 May 1955	Cunliffe-Lister	extant	subsidiary title of the Earl of Swinton
Baron Conesford	12 May 1955	Strauss	extinct 28 August 1974	
Baron Clitheroe	20 June 1955	Assheton	extant	
Baron Heyworth	23 July 1955	Heyworth	extinct 15 June 1974	
Baron McNair	4 August 1955	McNair	extant	
Baron McCorquodale of Newton	2 September 1955	McCorquodale	extinct 25 September 1971	
Baron Colyton	19 January 1956	Hopkinson	extant	
Baron Evershed	20 January 1956	Evershed	extinct 3 October 1966	
Baron Astor of Hever	21 January 1956	Astor	extant	
Baron Godber	23 January 1956	Godber	extinct 10 April 1976	
Baron Weeks	9 July 1956	Weeks	extinct 19 August 1960	
Baron Cohen of Birkenhead	16 July 1956	Cohen	extinct 7 August 1977	
Baron Sinclair of Cleeve	21 January 1957	Sinclair	extant	
Baron Mills	22 January 1957	Mills	extant	created Viscount Mills on 22 August 1962
Baron Bridges	4 February 1957	Bridges	extant	
Baron Hailes	15 February 1957	Buchan-Hepburn	extinct 5 November 1974	
Baron Evans	1 July 1957	Evans	extinct 26 October 1963	
Baron Rank	2 July 1957	Rank	extinct 29 March 1972	
Baron Norrie	22 August 1957	Norrie	extant	
Baron Brecon	30 January 1958	Lewis	extinct 10 October 1976	
Baron Birkett	31 January 1958	Birkett	extant	
Baron Harding of Petherton	17 February 1958	Harding	extant	
Baron Robins	10 July 1958	Robins	extinct 21 July 1962	
Baron Poole	11 July 1958	Poole	extant	
Baron Rootes	16 February 1959	Rootes	extant	
Baron Netherthorpe	10 March 1959	Turner	extant	
Baron Crathorne	15 July 1959	Dugdale	extant	
Baron Forster of Harraby	16 July 1959	Forster	extinct 24 July 1972	
Baron Spens	20 August 1959	Spens	extant	
Baron MacAndrew	8 December 1959	MacAndrew	extant	
Baron Nelson of Stafford	20 January 1960	Nelson	extant	
Baron Howick of Glendale	8 February 1960	Baring	extant	
Baron Gladwyn	12 February 1960	Jebb	extinct 15 August 2017	
Baron Sanderson of Ayot	4 July 1960	Sanderson	extant	
Baron Nugent	23 August 1960	Nugent	extinct 27 April 1973	
Baron Cobbold	23 November 1960	Cobbold	extant	
Baron Fleck	3 February 1961	Fleck	extinct 6 August 1968	
Baron Robertson of Oakridge	29 June 1961	Robertson	extant	
Baron Marks of Broughton	10 July 1961	Marks	extant	
Baron Fairhaven	25 July 1961	Broughton	extant	also Baron Fairhaven, which title extinct 20 August 1966
Baron Leighton of St Mellons	25 January 1962	Seager	extant	
Baron Brain	26 January 1962	Brain	extant	
Baron Aldington	29 January 1962	Low	extant	created Baron Low for life on 16 November 1999, which title became extinct on 7 December 2000
Baron Inchyra	2 February 1962	Millar	extant	
Baron Lambury	26 March 1962	Lord	extinct 13 September 1967	
Baron Mabane	15 June 1962	Mabane	extinct 16 November 1969	
Baron Dilhorne	17 July 1962	Manningham-Buller	extant	created Viscount Dilhorne on 7 December 1964
Baron Fyfe of Dornoch	20 July 1962	Fyfe	extinct 27 January 1967	subsidiary title of the Earl of Kilmuir
Baron Eccles	1 August 1962	Eccles	extant	created Viscount Eccles on 14 January 1964
Baron Silsoe	18 January 1963	Eve	extant	
Baron Normanbrook	24 January 1963	Brook	extinct 15 June 1967	
Baron Weston-super-Mare	30 January 1963	Alexander	extinct 11 January 1965	subsidiary title of the Earl Alexander of Hillsborough
Baron Drumalbyn	9 November 1963	Macpherson	extinct 11 October 1987	
Baron Wakefield of Kendal	15 November 1963	Wakefield	extinct 12 August 1983	
Baron Egremont	27 November 1963	Wyndham	extant	also Baron Leconfield from 1967
Baron Thomson of Fleet	10 March 1964	Thomson	extant	
Baron Martonmere	13 May 1964	Robinson	extant	
Baron Sherfield	29 June 1964	Makins	extant	
Baron Inglewood	30 June 1964	Fletcher-Vane	extant	
Baron Glendevon	16 July 1964	Hope	extant	
Baron Erskine of Rerrick	4 September 1964	Erskine	extinct 7 June 1995	
Baron Grimston of Westbury	11 December 1964	Grimston	extant	
Baron Erroll of Hale	19 December 1964	Erroll	extinct 14 September 2000	created Baron Erroll of Kilmun for life on 16 November 1999, which title became extinct on 14 September 2000
Baron Renwick	23 December 1964	Renwick	extant	
Baron Fraser of Allander	30 December 1964	Fraser	extinct 5 May 1987	
Baron St Helens	31 December 1964	Hughes-Young	extant	
Baron Margadale	1 January 1965 (A.M.)	Morrison	extant	
Baron Killyleagh	23 July 1986	Mountbatten-Windsor	extant	subsidiary title of the Duke of York, created Earl of Inverness at the same time
Baron Carrickfergus	26 May 2011	Mountbatten-Windsor	extant	subsidiary title of the Duke of Cambridge, created Earl of Strathearn at the same time
Baron Kilkeel	16 Jul 2018	Mountbatten-Windsor	extant	subsidiary title of the Duke of Sussex, created Earl of Dumbarton at the same time

== See also ==
- List of baronies in the Peerage of England
- List of lordships of Parliament
- List of hereditary baronies in the Peerage of Great Britain
- List of baronies in the Peerage of Ireland
- List of life peerages
  - List of law life peerages
  - List of life peerages before 1876
