= Tim Hely Hutchinson =

British book publisher (born 1953)

Tim Hely Hutchinson CBE
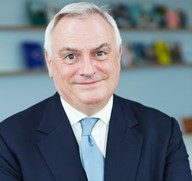
- Born: 26 October 1953 (age 72)
- Education: Magdalen College, Oxford
- Occupation: Publisher
- Known for: Co-founder of Headline Publishing Group
- Father: Richard Hely-Hutchinson, 8th Earl of Donoughmore

The Honourable Timothy Mark Hely Hutchinson CBE (born 26 October 1953) is a British publisher, former group CEO of the second largest British publisher, Hachette UK, and the second son of the 8th Earl of Donoughmore.

== Life ==
Hely Hutchinson is the second son of The 8th Earl of Donoughmore and Sheila Parsons (daughter of Frank Frederick Parsons), entitling him to the honorific "The Honourable". Educated at Magdalen College, Oxford, where he edited the student magazine Isis, Hely Hutchinson was employed by Macmillan Publishers in Britain and Australia, before working for Robert Maxwell as managing director of Macdonald Futura in 1982.

In 1986, he co-founded Headline Publishing Group, which floated on the London Stock Exchange in 1991, and was voted publisher of the year in 1992. In 1993, Headline bought the long-established firm of Hodder & Stoughton, creating Hodder Headline PLC, the fourth largest British publisher at that time. Hodder Headline was the subject of an agreed bid of £185 million from W.H. Smith in 1999. Having been a director of W.H. Smith and Chairman of W.H.Smith News, he engineered the sale of W. H. Smith's publishing business to Hachette Livre in 2004, staying on to run Hachette UK, which became Britain's biggest publisher when it acquired Little, Brown in 2006, also becoming a director of the American company. He subsequently acquired around 20 additional publishing businesses for Hachette.

His policies of industry-leading service to authors and involvement for every member of staff were successful and the company regularly published around one in four of all British bestsellers. Hachette UK's author list included Martina Cole, Cressida Cowell, Ian Rankin, Val McDermid, Stephen King and J. K. Rowling. Hely Hutchinson retired from Hachette UK in December 2017, being succeeded by David Shelley.

Hely Hutchinson was appointed a Chevalier de la Légion d'honneur in 2018 (investiture 2019) for the promotion of international literature and Anglo-French relations.

He was appointed Commander of the Order of the British Empire (CBE) in the 2019 Birthday Honours for services to publishing and literature.

In September 2025, Hely Hutchinson confirmed his investment in technology startup uRoutine, as part of their launch. The app is designed to boost productivity, through social impact and accountability. Hely Hutchinson said "uRoutine is a platform that is perfectly aligned with the cultural shift towards digital balance, meeting a huge and growing demand for tools that help people use technology more purposefully and productively.".
