= Thomas Sanderson, 1st Baron Sanderson =

British civil servant

The Right Honourable The Lord Sanderson GCB KCMG ISO
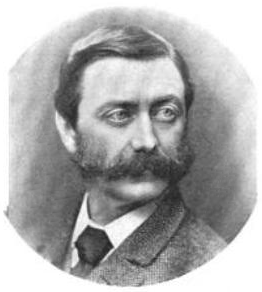
- In The Sketch, 21 November 1900

Personal details
- Born: 11 January 1841 Gunton Park, Norfolk, England
- Died: 21 March 1923 (aged 82) Wimpole Street, London, England
- Parent(s): Richard Sanderson; Hon. Charlotte Matilda Manners-Sutton
- Occupation: Civil servant

Thomas Henry Sanderson, 1st Baron Sanderson GCB KCMG ISO (11 January 1841 – 21 March 1923) was a British civil servant. He was Permanent Under-Secretary of State for Foreign Affairs between 1894 and 1906.

== Background and education ==
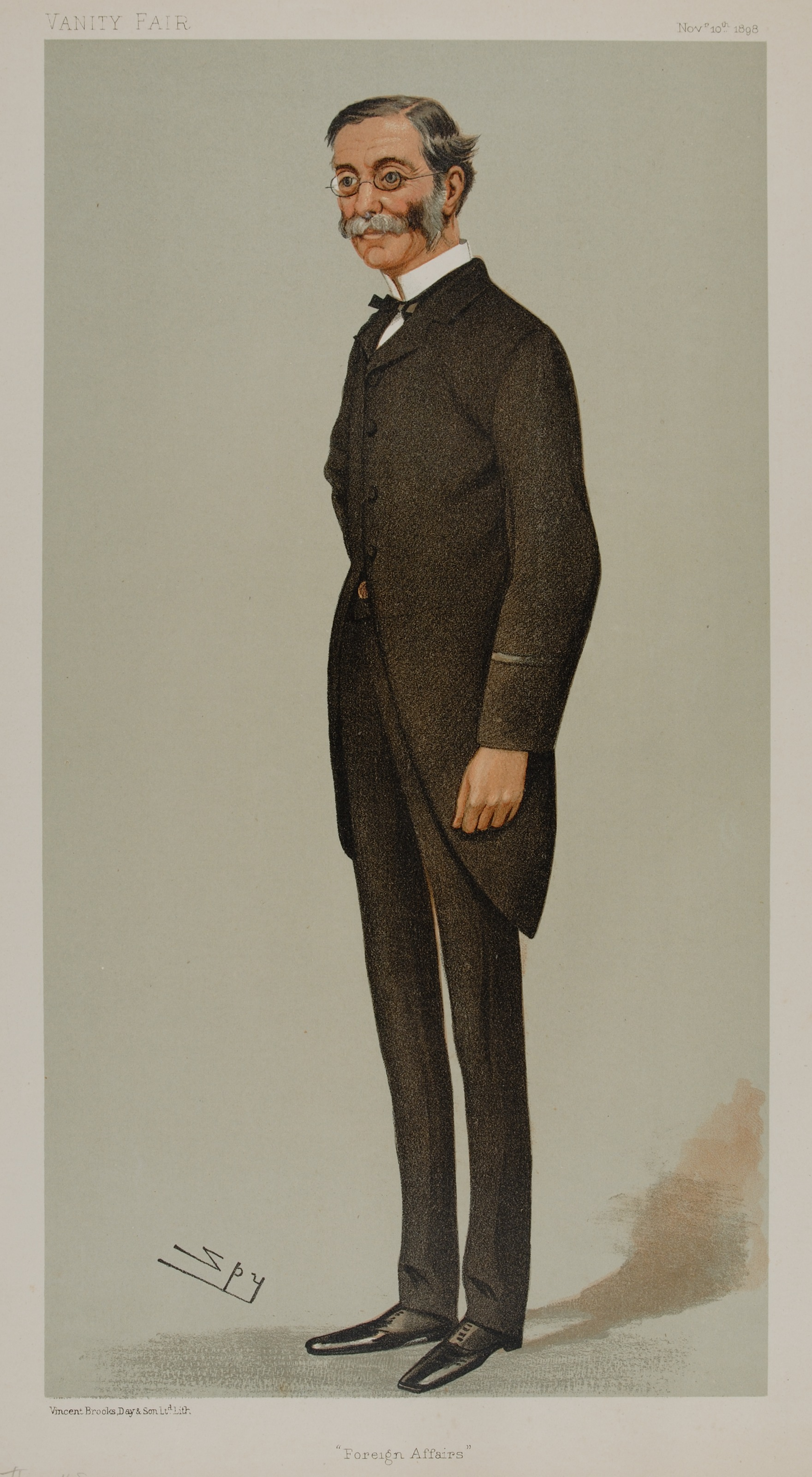
Caricature in Vanity Fair, 10 November 1898

Sanderson was born at Gunton Park, about six miles north of Aylsham, Norfolk, the second son of Richard Sanderson, Member of Parliament for Colchester from 1832 to 1847, and the Honourable Charlotte Matilda Sanderson Manners-Sutton, elder daughter of Charles Manners-Sutton, Speaker of the House of Commons from 1817 to 1835. He was educated at Eton until he was forced to leave the school in 1857 due to the poor state of his family's finances, caused by the death of his father in October of that year, and his father's business in East India failing.

== Career ==
Sanderson entered the Foreign Office as a junior clerk in 1859 and was not to leave the Foreign Office until his retirement in 1906. In December 1863 Sanderson accompanied Lord Wodehouse to Berlin and Copenhagen on his special mission during the Schleswig-Holstein crisis. Early in his career he crossed paths with Lord Stanley, later 15th Earl of Derby. Sanderson became Stanley's private secretary in July 1866 and left an impression on Stanley, who described him as "the best of the juniors" on exit from office, after Benjamin Disraeli's first government fell in the 1868 December General Election. In 1871 he went to Geneva during the arbitration between the United Kingdom and the USA on the Alabama claims. He was later private secretary to Foreign Secretary Lord Granville between 1880 and 1885, Senior Clerk at the Foreign Office between 1885 and 1889, Assistant Permanent Under-Secretary of State for Foreign Affairs between 1889 and 1894 and Permanent Under-Secretary of State for Foreign Affairs between 1894 and 1906. On 20 December 1905 he was raised to the peerage as Baron Sanderson, of Armthorpe in the County of York.

== Personal life ==
Sanderson's nickname was "Lamps" due to his strong spectacles. He died unmarried at Wimpole Street, London, on 21 March 1923, aged 82, when the barony became extinct.

Diplomatic posts
Preceded by Sir Philip Currie	Permanent Under-Secretary of State for Foreign Affairs; 1894–1906	Succeeded by Sir Charles Hardinge
Peerage of the United Kingdom
New creation	Baron Sanderson; 1905–1923	Extinct
