= Henry Sanderson Furniss, 1st Baron Sanderson =

British academic (1868–1939)

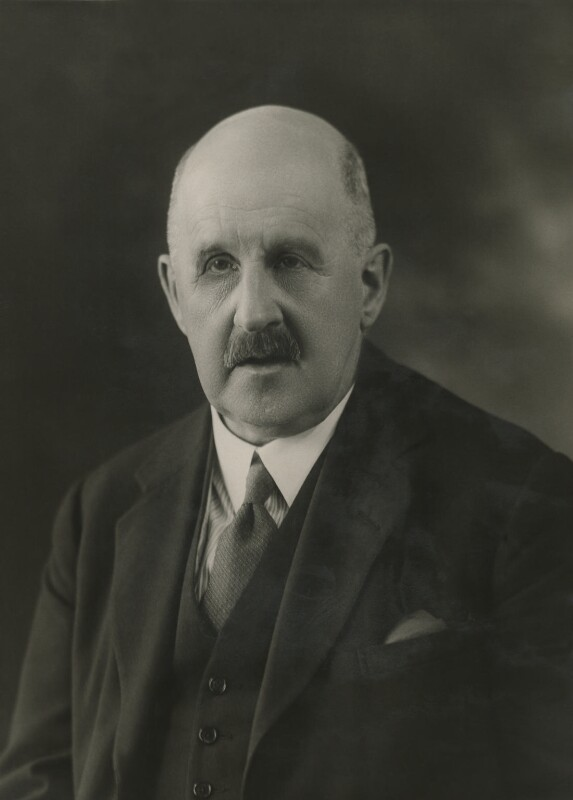
Lord Sanderson in 1930

Henry Sanderson Furniss, 1st Baron Sanderson (1 October 1868 – 25 March 1939), was an English educationalist and socialist politician. He was the third Principal of Ruskin College, an educational institution in Oxford, England, for adults lacking in prior formal education.

== Early life ==
Furniss was born in London on 1 October 1868, the elder son of Thomas Sanderson Furniss (1833–1912) and Thomas' wife and second cousin Mary Sanderson (died 1899). Like his eldest sister May, Furniss was discovered to be blind from a very young age, possibly as a result of ophthalmia neonatorum at the time of his birth. Two younger siblings had normal eyesight. Furniss's eyesight allowed him to distinguish large objects but he was never able to read. Fortunately, private tutoring (made possible by his family's wealth) allowed him to gain an education that led ultimately to a distinguished academic career in economics.

== Career ==
Furniss read modern history at Hertford College, Oxford, and graduated with a second-class degree in 1893. After leaving university, Furniss spent several years working with the Bristol Charity Organization Society, an organisation that his father also supported, in London.

From 1907 to 1916 he was a lecturer at Ruskin College; from 1916 to 1925 he served as the principal of the college. While serving as principal, the college began to admit women as students, in 1919.

While working in Oxford, Furniss was an active participant in the Socialist Fabian Society. At the 1918 general election, he ran unsuccessfully as the Labour Party candidate for Oxford University.

On 18 June 1930, Furniss was created Baron Sanderson, of Hunmanby, in the County of York, in recognition of his distinguished career in education. Furniss was an active member of the Lords and represented the Labour peers on the parliamentary executive of the Labour Party. In the late 1930s he was a member of the Parliamentary Pacifist Group. In October 1938, Furniss supported the Conservative candidate at the Oxford City by-election, when the Munich Agreement was the predominant issue.

== Private life ==
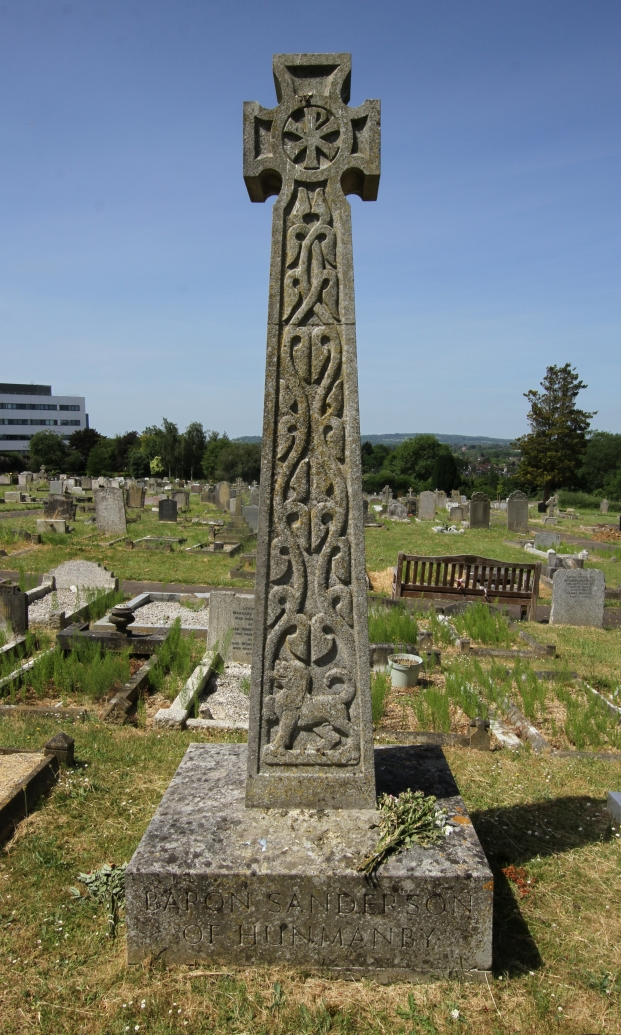
Stone cross on Baron Sanderson's grave in Headington

Furniss married Averil Dorothy Nicholl on 23 January 1902. There were no children from their marriage.

Furniss died suddenly at the Lansdowne Club in London on 25 March 1939. He is buried at Headington cemetery, Oxford.

Peerage of the United Kingdom
| New creation | Baron Sanderson; 2nd creation 1930–1939 | Extinct |
