= David Shelley (publisher) =

British publisher (born 1976)

- Born: 1976 (age 49–50)
- Education: New College, Oxford
- Occupation: Publisher
- Years active: 1997–present
- Employer: Hachette Livre
- Known for: CEO of Hachette UK and Hachette Book Group

David Shelley (born 1976) is a British publisher who is Chief Executive Officer of both Hachette UK (the second-largest trade publisher, with divisions including Hodder & Stoughton, Orion, Headline, John Murray, and Little, Brown) and the Hachette Book Group in the US. Shelley is past President of the Publishers Association, a trustee of The Reading Agency and a director of Tate Enterprises.

Shelley began his publishing career at the age of 23 working as an editorial assistant at the independent company Allison and Busby, founded in 1967 by Clive Allison and Margaret Busby, and after five years running the company he moved on to become editorial director of Little, Brown in 2005, publisher at Sphere in 2007, then in 2009 Deputy Publisher at Little, Brown, and Publisher there in 2011. Shelley oversees Hachette's inclusion initiative, "Changing the Story", which he founded in 2016.

In November 2023, it was announced that as of January 2024 Shelley would be taking on a newly created role leading both Hachette UK (HUK) and the Hachette Book Group (HBG) in the US.

== Biography ==
=== Education and career ===
David Shelley grew up living above the second-hand bookshop in Lewes, East Sussex, that his parents ran, and after a state education he became the first in his family to attend university, graduating from New College, Oxford, where he read English (1994–97).

In 1997, he began his career in the publishing industry by working at Allison and Busby as an editorial assistant ("cum-dogsbody") to the company's then publisher, Peter Day. Shelley went on to run the company as Publishing Director at the age of 23 when his boss retired in 2000.

Shelley joined the Little, Brown Book Group as Editorial Director in 2005, becoming Publisher of their commercial imprint Sphere in 2007. In 2009, he became Little, Brown Deputy Publisher, then overall Publisher from 2011 to 2015, subsequently becoming Chief Executive Officer of the Orion Publishing Group and the Little, Brown Book Group, and in 2018 taking on the role of Group CEO of Hachette UK.

In January 2024, Shelley took on the new expanded role of CEO for the Hachette Book Group in both the US and the UK, based in New York.

=== Diversity initiatives ===
Shelley has been outspoken about the need for inclusivity and diversity in leadership roles in the publishing industry as well as in the books published. In 2016 he started an Hachette initiative called "Changing the Story", aiming to make the company more diverse and inclusive, in which was launched an imprint called Dialogue Books, headed by Sharmaine Lovegrove, to "publish books by writers from diverse backgrounds who may otherwise not have been picked up by the establishment". He has said: "Unfortunately, there've been too many decades where nothing has happened, so there's a lot of ground we have to make up for in the industry. And the sad thing is that there are potential classics that were never published in the 60s–90s because the industry was very much one way. I'm reminded of Allison and Busby, the first company I worked for. It was started by two people – a man called Clive Allison and a woman called Margaret Busby. Margaret was the first black British woman to have a publishing company. They started that in 1967, and she published some amazing writers like Ishmael Reed and CLR James – just some fantastic BAME writers. What's also sad is that from 1967 till up to two or three years ago, there were very few other Margaret Busbys and things didn't move on. I think there's an awful lot of ground the industry has to cover".

Following the murder of George Floyd on 25 May 2020, Hachette UK donated £10,000 to The United Families and Friends Campaign (a grouping of families and friends of those who have died in the custody of police and prison officers), and £10,000 to The Inclusive Indies Fund, to help diversity-led independent publishers survive the coronavirus crisis. Shelley said: "...there is a more urgent need than ever for us to stand together and educate ourselves, become better allies and offer financial support where we can. These events highlight the importance of the Black Lives Matter movement and, closer to home, they underpin the vital work of THRIVE, Hachette's network for BAME employees, Changing The Story, our strategy to make the company more inclusive at all levels, and Dialogue Books, our imprint focused on illuminating voices often excluded from the mainstream."

After the publication on 15 June 2020 of an open letter from the newly formed Black Writers' Guild, calling for change in the UK publishing industry to address inequalities in output and personnel, Shelley was quoted in The Guardian as saying that "the industry could and should do a lot more – and that we could and should do a lot more at Hachette".

Shelley has also expressed a commitment to regional diversity, with plans for Hachette to open new offices in Sheffield, Edinburgh, Newcastle, Manchester and Bristol, so as "to forge closer links to the brilliant pool of creative talent outside the 'London bubble' and connect more closely with readers, authors and booksellers around the UK to enrich our publishing."

== Recognition ==
Shelley was on the Progress 1000 list of "London's most influential people 2016 – Literati".

In 2017 and subsequent years, he was named in the Financial Times annual OUTstanding list of LGBT+ executives, becoming the second senior executive from Hachette UK to be listed, after his predecessor Tim Hely Hutchinson.
