= Hachette Book Group =

Publishing company owned by Hachette Livre

- Parent company: Hachette Livre
- Predecessor: Warner Books (1970–1996); Time Warner Trade Publishing (1996–2002); AOL Time Warner Book Group (2002–2006)
- Founded: March 31, 2006; 20 years ago
- Country of origin: United States
- Headquarters location: New York City, U.S.
- Key people: David Shelley (CEO)
- Imprints: Basic Books Group; Grand Central Publishing; Hachette Audio; Hachette Books; Hachette Nashville; Little, Brown and Company; Little, Brown Books for Young Readers; Popular Library; Orbit; Running Press Group; Workman Publishing
- Owner: Louis Hachette Group
- Official website: hachettebookgroup.com

Hachette Book Group, Inc. (Note: The pronunciations in English include an approximation of the French: [aʃɛt], and a version with hard h, /həˈʃɛt/.) (HBG) is an American-based publishing company owned by Hachette Livre, the largest publishing company in France, and the third largest trade and educational publisher in the world. Hachette Livre is an indirect subsidiary of Louis Hachette Group, controlled by the French Bolloré family, which also controls Universal Music Group, Havas, and Canal+. HBG was formed when Hachette Livre purchased the Time Warner Book Group from Time Warner on March 31, 2006. Its headquarters are located at 1290 Avenue of the Americas, Midtown Manhattan, New York City. Hachette is considered one of the "big five" publishing companies, along with Holtzbrinck/Macmillan, Penguin Random House, HarperCollins, and Simon & Schuster. On an annual basis, HBG publishes approximately 1400 adult books (including 50–100 digital-only titles), 300 books for young readers, and 450 audiobook titles (including both physical and downloadable-only titles). In 2017, the company had 167 books on The New York Times Best Seller list, 34 of which reached No. 1.

== History ==
=== As part of Time Warner ===
Kinney National Company (rebranded in 1972 as Warner Communications) had acquired the Paperback Library in 1970 to form Warner Books. In 1982, CBS Publications sold off Popular Library to Warner.

In April 1985, Warner Books relaunched Popular Library. Questar was Popular's new imprint for science fiction. Also in 1985, Warner acquired audiobook publisher Network for Learning and renamed it Warner Audio.

Time Warner was formed in 1989 by the merger of Time Inc. and Warner Communications. This brought in the earliest publisher to eventually become part of the Hachette Book Group, Little, Brown and Company, founded in 1837 and acquired by Time Inc. in 1968.

Publisher Macdonald & Co. was bought in 1992 to become part of the Time Warner Book Group UK, and in 1996 the various branches merged to become Time Warner Trade Publishing, later renamed as AOL Time Warner Book Group.

=== As part of Hachette Livre ===
In 2003, Time Warner attempted to sell the Book Group but failed to get high enough bids. In March 2006, Time Warner completed the sale of the Book Group to Lagardère, which placed it under its Hachette Livre book publishing arm. The Warner Books subsidiary was renamed Grand Central Publishing, which launched a more literary imprint, Twelve, under former Random House editor-in-chief Jonathan Karp. On February 5, 2010, Hachette announced that it would adopt an agency pricing model for its e-books.

On April 11, 2012, the United States Department of Justice filed United States v. Apple Inc., naming Apple, Hachette, and four other major publishers as defendants. The suit alleged that they conspired to fix prices for e-books, and weaken Amazon.com's position in the market, in violation of antitrust law. In December 2013, a federal judge approved a settlement of the antitrust claims, in which Hachette and the other publishers paid into a fund that provided credits to customers who had overpaid for books due to the price-fixing.

On June 28, 2013, Hachette announced it would acquire Hyperion Books from Disney Publishing Worldwide. On March 12, 2014, Hyperion was renamed Hachette Books, with the naming of Crown Archetype's editor-in-chief Mauro DiPreta as vice president and publisher.

In May 2014, Amazon.com announced it was no longer taking pre-orders for Hachette books, stating a breakdown in negotiations over profit-sharing arrangements. According to Hachette, Amazon had also stopped discounting its books, sending prices of Hachette titles in the U.S. to more than twice what they were selling for in the UK. Amazon published a letter on August 10, 2014 asking authors and readers to email Hachette's CEO Michael Pietsch and ask for lower e-book prices. Pietsch reportedly replied to each message he received.

In November 2014, Hachette announced that it had entered into an agreement to purchase nonfiction publisher Black Dog & Leventhal. The sale was finalized in January 2015, and Black Dog & Leventhal became an imprint of the Hachette Books publishing division.

In June 2014, the company in conjunction with Ingram Content Group, and Perseus Books Group, announced a three-way deal whereby Hachette would buy Perseus and then sell that company's client services businesses to Ingram. Financial details of the deal were not disclosed. The deal was called off on August 7, 2014. On March 6, 2016, HBG announced that it had entered into a binding agreement to purchase the publishing division of The Perseus Books Group. Perseus's distribution business was sold to Ingram in a separate move. The sale was completed in April 2016, and the publishing business joined HBG as the Perseus Books publishing group.

In April 2016, HBG announced an agreement to create a joint venture with the Yen Press imprint and Japanese publisher Kadokawa. Yen Press became known as Yen Press LLC, and is no longer considered an imprint of HBG's Orbit publishing division.

On September 17, 2018, Hachette acquired the Christian publisher Worthy Publishing. This was followed by a reorganization in November, in which Worthy Publishing and FaithWords merged their teams under the Hachette Nashville division, and Hachette Books was moved under the Perseus Books division while taking the Da Capo Press staff and imprints. A total of 25 employees were leaving in the move, including Mauro DiPreta (Hachette Books' vice president and publisher) and John Radziewicz (Da Capo Press's vice president and publisher). Basic Books will also take on Seal Press, which it will continue as an imprint.

On June 1, 2020, Hachette was one of a group of publishers who sued the Internet Archive, arguing that its collection of e-books was denying authors and publishers revenue and accusing the library of "willful mass copyright infringement".

== Publishing groups and imprints ==
Hachette Book Group operates a number of publishing brands aimed at different markets, and these brands themselves contain sub-imprints that are used to publish to an even more targeted audience.

Grand Central Publishing is an independent publishing division within Hachette. It was previously known as Warner Books.

Imprint	Market
Grand Central Publishing	General market and best-sellers
Forever	Romance novels
Forever Yours	Digital books
Grand Central Life & Style	Lifestyle and wellness
Twelve	Literature and nonfiction
Vision	Mass market editions

=== Hachette Audio ===
Publishing group focused on audiobook adaptations and dramatizations of books published by various imprints within the Hachette group.

Imprint	Market
Hachette Audio	Flagship imprint
Hachette Audio Powered by Wattpad	Adaptations of works originally published on Wattpad.
Hachette Audio Podcasts	Original podcasts

=== Hachette Nashville ===
Publishing group composed of imprints acquired from Warner Communications and Worthy Publishing. Formerly known as Warner Faith Books.

Imprint	Market
Hachette Nashville	Christian works
Center Street	Conservative and military works
FaithWords	Christian inspirational
Worthy	Christian best sellers
WorthyKids/Ideals	Children's works

=== Little, Brown and Company ===
An independent publishing division within Hachette. Founded in 1837. Focused on fiction, non fiction, and "works of lasting significance". Purchased by Time Inc. in 1961, becoming part of Time Life. Sold to Hachette in 2006.

Imprint	Market
Little, Brown and Company	Fiction and non-fiction
Back Bay Books	Trade paperback editions
Mulholland Books	Mystery, suspense and speculative fiction
Spark	Health and wellness
Voracious	Illustrated books
JIMMY Patterson	Children's books. Founded by James Patterson.

==== Little, Brown Books for Young Readers ====
Imprint	Market
Little, Brown Books for Young Readers	Picture books and non-fiction for young readers.
LB Kids	Novelty and brand tie-ins.
Poppy	Fiction for young women.

=== Orbit Books ===
A publishing division focused on science fiction, fantasy, and mass market editions. Spun off from Little, Brown in 2006. Not to be confused with Orbis Books.

Imprint	Market
Orbit	Science fiction and fantasy
Redhook	Mass market editions

=== Perseus Books Group ===
An independent publishing division within Hachette. Founded in 1996. Acquired by Hachette in 2016.

Imprint name	Market
Perseus Books	Flagship imprint
Avalon Travel	Guidebooks and travel literature
Basic Books	Non-fiction
Da Capo Press	Pop culture and wellness, under Hachette Books
Hachette Books	Non-fiction and general interest. Formerly Hyperion Books
PublicAffairs	History, economics and public affairs
Running Press	Pop culture, inspirational and adult tie-ins.

=== Inactive imprints ===
Many imprints have been acquired by Hachette and the companies that were merged to form the group; some are no longer active.

- Abacus
- Paperback Library (Called the Warner Paperback Library after acquisition by Warner Communications in 1970. Not acquired by Hachette.)
- Questar Science Fiction
- Warner Aspect
- Reagan Arthur Books
- Jericho Books
- Business Plus
- Bulfinch Press (Bulfinch titles are now considered part of Little, Brown & Company.)
- 5 Spot
- Weinstein Books: Formerly an imprint of Perseus Books, this publisher was shut down on October 12, 2017, after multiple women accused its founder Harvey Weinstein of sexual harassment.
- ipicturebooks (first bought by Time Warner Trade Publishing)

== See also ==
- Penguin Random House
- Simon & Schuster
- Macmillan
- HarperCollins
