= Richard Hely-Hutchinson, 6th Earl of Donoughmore =

Anglo-Irish peer and Conservative politician (1875–1948)

The Right Honourable The Earl of Donoughmore KP, PC
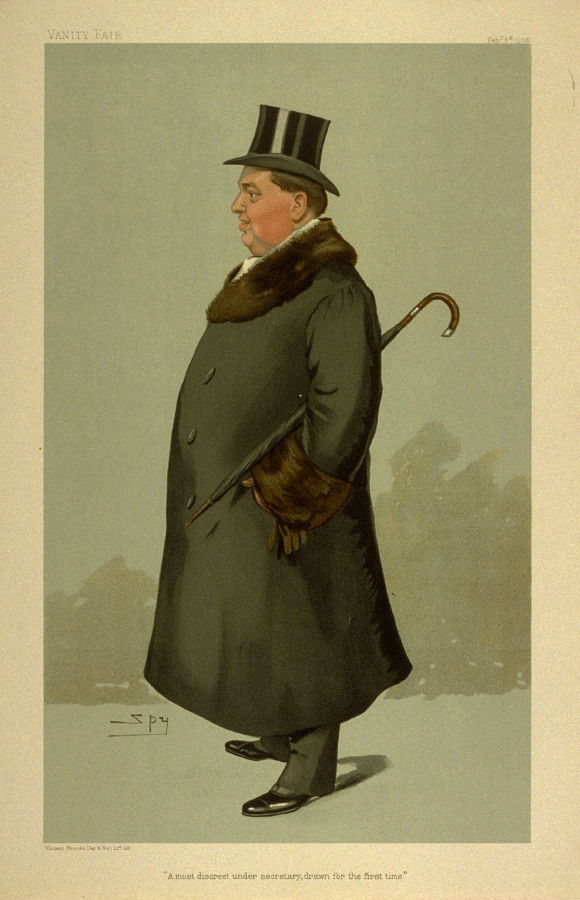
- "A most discreet under secretary, drawn for the first time". Caricature by Spy in Vanity Fair February 1905

Under-Secretary of State for War
- In office 12 October 1903 – 4 December 1905
- Monarch: Edward VII
- Prime Minister: Arthur Balfour
- Preceded by: The Earl of Hardwicke
- Succeeded by: The Earl of Portsmouth

Personal details
- Born: 2 March 1875
- Died: 19 October 1948 (aged 73)
- Party: Conservative
- Spouse: Elena Maria Grace (d. 1944)
- Parent: John Hely-Hutchinson (father)

Richard Walter John Hely-Hutchinson, 6th Earl of Donoughmore KP PC (2 March 1875 – 19 October 1948), styled Viscount Suirdale until 1900, was an Anglo-Irish peer and Conservative politician. He served as Under-Secretary of State for War under Arthur Balfour between 1903 and 1905.

== Background and education ==
Donoughmore was the son of John Hely-Hutchinson, 5th Earl of Donoughmore, and Frances Isabella Stephens, daughter of General William Frazer Stephens. He was educated at Eton. In November 1901 he was promoted to captain of the 3rd (Militia) Battalion, The Royal Irish Regiment, and the following January he resigned his commission.

== Political career ==
Donoughmore succeeded his father in the earldom in 1900 and took his seat in the House of Lords. He served as Under-Secretary of State for War from 1903 to 1905 in the Unionist administration headed by Arthur Balfour. From 1911 he was Lord Chairman of Committees of the House of Lords. He was elected Grand Master of the Grand Lodge of Ireland in 1913, a post he held until his death. In 1916 he was part of the Mesopotamia Commission of Inquiry. He was made a Knight of the Order of St Patrick in 1916 and sworn of the Privy Council in 1918. In June 1920, he was one of three candidates for the post of Governor-General of Australia presented to the Australian prime minister Billy Hughes, along with Lord Forster and General Seely.

In 1921 Lord Donoughmore was elected one of the fifteen Peers of the Realm resident in the South (elected by a constituency of all Southern Ireland peers) to be a member of the Senate of Southern Ireland under the Government of Ireland Act 1920. The Senate convened in 1921 but was boycotted by Irish nationalists. Donoughmore did not attend its first meeting. In 1929 he chaired the Committee on Ministers' Powers following Viscount Hewart's controversial book, The New Despotism, in which Hewart asserted that the rule of law in Britain was being undermined by the executive at the expense of the legislature and the courts. The book was very controversial and led to the committee. The report rejected Hewart's arguments.

In 1927 he also led the Donoughmore Commission that recommended a new way of governing Ceylon (now Sri Lanka), introducing universal suffrage and trying to involve each ethnic group fairly.

== Family ==
Lord Donoughmore married at St. Michael's Church, Chester Square, on 21 December 1901, Elena Maria Grace, daughter of Michael P. Grace. She died on 22 February 1944. Lord Donoughmore died in October 1948, aged 73, and was succeeded in the earldom by his son, John.

Political offices
Preceded by The Earl of Hardwicke	Under-Secretary of State for War; 1903–1905	Succeeded by The Earl of Portsmouth
Masonic offices
Preceded by The Duke of Abercorn	Grandmaster of the Grand Lodge of Ireland; 1913–1948	Succeeded by Raymond Fredrick Brooke
Peerage of Ireland
Preceded by John Hely-Hutchinson	Earl of Donoughmore; 1900–1948	Succeeded by John Hely-Hutchinson
