= Stanley Tiffany =

Stanley Tiffany CBE (11 June 1908 – 19 March 1971) was an English Labour Co-operative politician. He sat in the House of Commons from 1945 to 1950.

He was the son of Alert Tiffany from Rothwell in the West Riding of Yorkshire. He was educated at the Leeds Boys' Modern School, and became an electrical engineer, and a director of the Peterborough and District Co-operative Society.

He was elected at the 1945 general election as the member of parliament (MP) for the Peterborough division of Northamptonshire, defeating the sitting Conservative MP John Hely-Hutchinson, known by his courtesy title as Viscount Suirdale. He held the seat until his defeat at the 1950 general election by the Conservative Harmar Nicholls.

After leaving Parliament he returned to Yorkshire, becoming a member of Wakefield Borough Council from 1952 to 1967, and owned a hotel in Bridlington. He was made a Commander of the Order of the British Empire (CBE) in 1967.

Parliament of the United Kingdom
Preceded by Viscount Suirdale	Member of Parliament for Peterborough; 1945 – 1950	Succeeded by Harmar Nicholls
