= John Hely-Hutchinson, 5th Earl of Donoughmore =

Irish peer

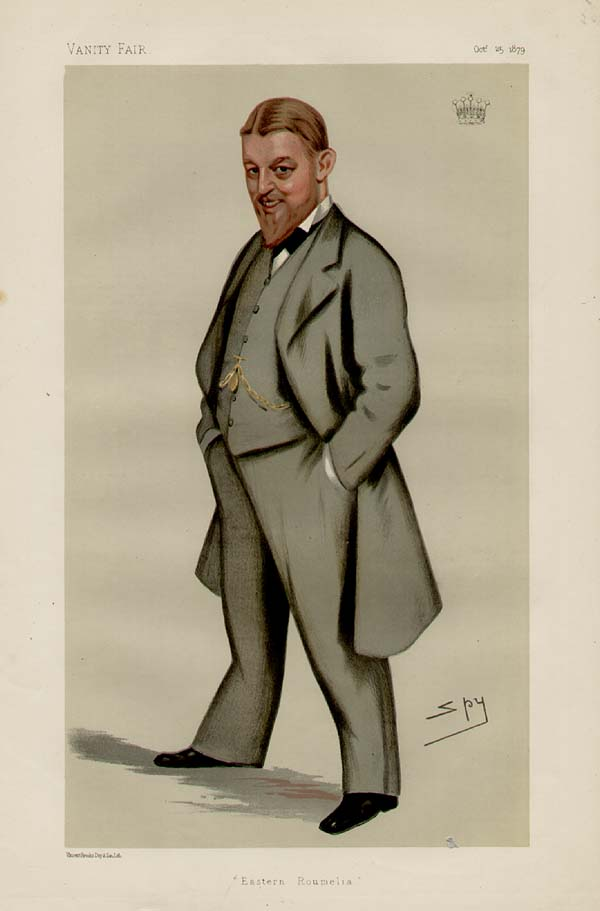
"Eastern Roumelia" The Earl of Donoughmore as caricatured by Spy (Leslie Ward) in Vanity Fair, October 1879

John Luke George Hely-Hutchinson, 5th Earl of Donoughmore KCMG JP DL (2 March 1848 – 5 December 1900), styled Viscount Suirdale between 1851 and 1866, was an Irish peer.

Donoughmore was the son of Richard Hely-Hutchinson, 4th Earl of Donoughmore and Thomasina Jocelyn Steele. He succeeded to his father's peerages in 1866 and gained a seat in the House of Lords. He was educated at Eton and Balliol College, Oxford. He was Assistant Commissioner for the European Commission for the Organization of Eastern Roumelia between 1878 and 1879 and was appointed a Knight Commander of the Order of St Michael and St George (KCMG) in 1879. He was also a justice of the peace for County Waterford and a deputy lieutenant of County Tipperary and of County Waterford. In 1893 he spoke in the House of Lords in favour of the Home Rule for Ireland.

Lord Donoughmore married Frances Isabella Stephens, daughter of General William Frazer Stephens of the Indian army, at Hobart, Tasmania, on 19 May 1874, and they had five children, including Richard Hely-Hutchinson, 6th Earl of Donoughmore.

== Gallery ==
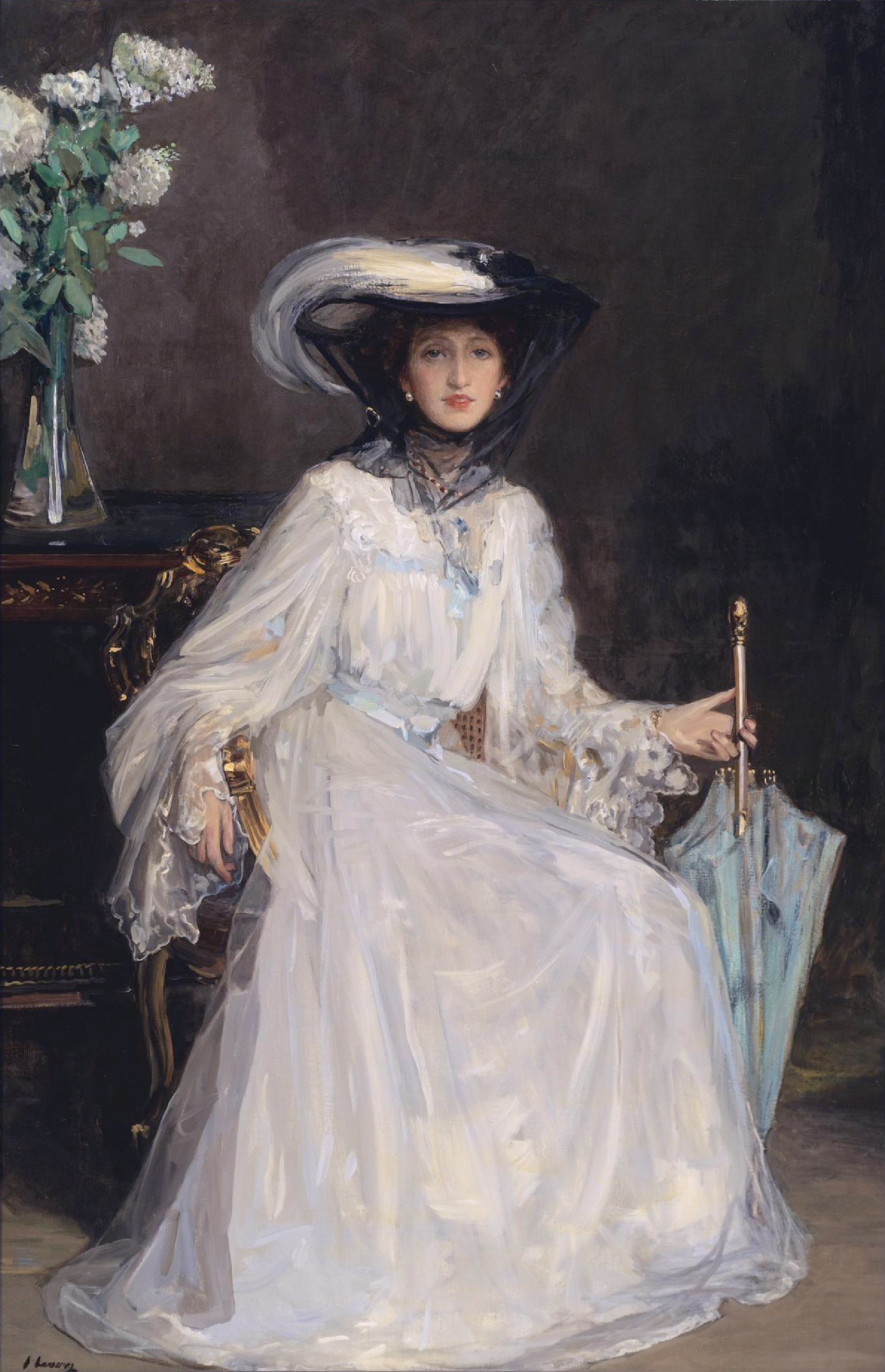
Evelyn Farquhar, wife of Captain Francis Douglas Farquhar (by John Lavery)

Peerage of Ireland
Preceded by Richard Hely-Hutchinson	Earl of Donoughmore; 1866–1900	Succeeded by Richard Hely-Hutchinson
