= The New Despotism =

1929 book by Gordon Hewart

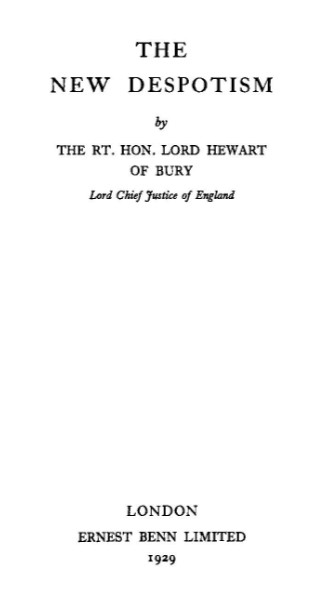
- Title page for The New Despotism (1929)
- Author: Lord Hewart of Bury
- Language: English
- Subject: Law and Politics
- Publisher: Ernest Benn Limited
- Publication date: 1929
- Publication place: United Kingdom
- Pages: vii+308

The New Despotism is a book written by the Lord Hewart, Lord Chief Justice of England, and published in 1929 by Ernest Benn Limited. Hewart described this "new despotism" as "to subordinate Parliament, to evade the Courts, and to render the will, or the caprice, of the Executive unfettered and supreme". The evasion of the Courts referred to increasing quasi-judicial decision-making by the civil service and the subordination of Parliament which resulted from the growth of delegated legislation.

== Contents ==
I. The Nature of the Question
II. The Rule of Law
III. "Administrative Law"
IV. Administrative Lawlessness
V. The System at Work
VI. Departmental Legislation
VII. The Independence of the Judiciary
VIII. What is to be done?
IX. Some leading cases
X. Examples from statutes

== Reaction ==
The book created "a constitutional and political storm". It was rumoured that Whitehall "considered an attempt to boycott it". In response the British Government appointed the Donoughmore Committee (chaired by Lord Donoughmore) to review the powers of Ministers, however its Report (1932; Cmd. 4060) did not share Hewart's alarm.

The book and the Donoughmore Report provoked a group of socialist lawyers and political scientists, notably Professor Harold Laski (a member of the Donoughmore Committee) and Ivor Jennings to criticise the Diceyan concept of the rule of law.

In 1956, Richard Crossman published a Fabian Society tract titled Socialism and the New Despotism where he hoped reform of the judiciary would make the judiciary "regain the traditional function of defending individual rights against encroachment".

The book was a favourite of Margaret Thatcher's.
