= Michael Hely-Hutchinson, 8th Earl of Donoughmore =

Irish peer (1927–2025)

Richard Michael John Hely Hutchinson, 8th Earl of Donoughmore (8 August 1927 – 25 April 2025) was an Irish peer, styled Viscount Suirdale from 1948 until 1981.

The son of John Hely-Hutchinson, 7th Earl of Donoughmore, and Dorothy Jean Hotham, he succeeded to his father's titles in 1981 and sat in the House of Lords under the Viscountcy of Hutchinson (a title in the Peerage of the United Kingdom). Due to the House of Lords Act 1999 he lost his seat.

Donoughmore was educated at Winchester, Groton School (Massachusetts) and New College, Oxford, graduating with a medical degree and later gaining the rank of captain in the service of the Royal Army Medical Corps.

Donoughmore died on 25 April 2025, at the age of 97.

== Family ==
Lord Donoughmore's first wife was Sheila Parsons, daughter of Frank Parsons and Jean Falconer. From this marriage he has four children. Lady Donoughmore died in 1998, and Lord Donoughmore married Margaret Stonehouse in 2003. He lived in Oxfordshire. He was the father of the publisher Tim Hely Hutchinson and the painter Nicholas Hely Hutchinson. His younger brother is Mark Hely Hutchinson, former CEO of Bank of Ireland.

== See also ==
- Hely-Hutchinson v Brayhead Ltd (1968); 1 QB 549
- Earl of Donoughmore

Peerage of Ireland
Preceded by John Hely-Hutchinson	Earl of Donoughmore; 1981–2025	Succeeded by John Michael James Hely-Hutchinson
