= John Hely-Hutchinson, 7th Earl of Donoughmore =

British politician

Member of Parliament for Peterborough
- In office 15 October 1943 – 15 June 1945
- Preceded by: David Cecil, Lord Burghley
- Succeeded by: Stanley Tiffany

Personal details
- Born: John Michael Hely-Hutchinson; 12 November 1902 Donoughmore, Ireland
- Died: 12 August 1981 (aged 78) Ireland
- Spouse: Dorothy Hotham (m. 1925)
- Children: 3, including Richard
- Parent(s): Richard Hely-Hutchinson, 6th Earl of Donoughmore; Elena Marie Grace
- Occupation: Hereditary peer in the House of Lords

John Michael Henry Hely-Hutchinson, 7th Earl of Donoughmore (12 November 1902 – 12 August 1981), known until 1948 by his courtesy title Viscount Suirdale, was a British politician who later sat as an hereditary peer in the House of Lords.

== Background ==
Lord Donoughmore was the son of Richard Hely-Hutchinson, 6th Earl of Donoughmore. Lord Donoughmore was member of parliament (MP) for Peterborough from 1943 to 1945. In 1948 he succeeded to all his father's peerages. In the military Donoughmore gained the rank of Colonel in the service of the Royal Armoured Corps (Territorial Army). A Freemason, he was chosen Grandmaster of the Grand Lodge of Ireland in 1964, a post he held until his death.

Donoughmore is perhaps most famous for being kidnapped from Knocklofty House, Clonmel, in June 1974, with his wife, Dorothy, by the IRA as a political hostage, being released after a week. Lord Donoughmore was succeeded by his son Richard, the 8th Earl, in 1981.

== Marriage and issue ==
On 27 July 1925, Lord Donoughmore married Dorothy Jean Hotham (12 August 1906 – 29 December 1995), daughter of John Beaumont Hotham and Gladys Mary Wilson. The couple had three children:

- Richard Hely-Hutchinson, 8th Earl of Donoughmore (born 8 August 1927; died 25 April 2025)
- Lady Sara ('Sally') Elena Hely-Hutchinson (born 22 August 1930; died in 2013) m. William Janson Collins of the eponymous publishing house.
- Hon. Mark Hely-Hutchinson (born 19 May 1934)

== See also ==
- List of kidnappings
- Lists of solved missing person cases

Parliament of the United Kingdom
Preceded by David Cecil, Lord Burghley	Member of Parliament for Peterborough; 1943 – 1945	Succeeded by Stanley Tiffany
Masonic offices
Preceded by Raymond Fredrick Brooke	Grandmaster of the Grand Lodge of Ireland; 1964–1981	Succeeded by The Marquess of Donegall
Peerage of Ireland
Preceded by Richard Hely-Hutchinson	Earl of Donoughmore; 1948–1981	Succeeded by Richard Hely-Hutchinson
