= Gordon Hewart, 1st Viscount Hewart =

British politician (1870–1943)

The Right Honourable The Viscount Hewart PC
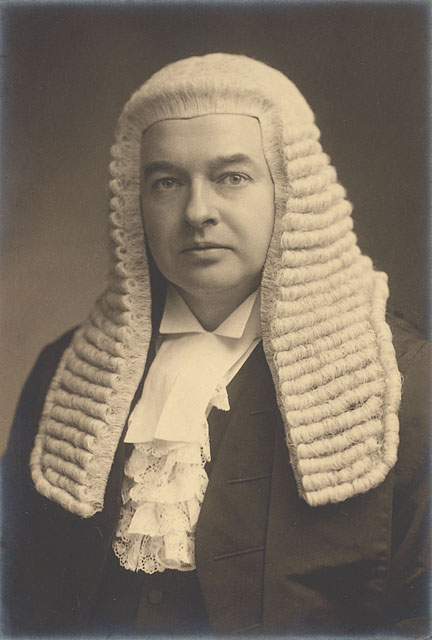

Lord Chief Justice of England
- In office 8 March 1922 – 12 October 1940
- Monarchs: George V Edward VIII; George VI
- Preceded by: The Lord Trevethin
- Succeeded by: The Viscount Caldecote

Attorney General for England and Wales
- In office 10 January 1919 – 6 March 1922
- Monarch: George V
- Prime Minister: David Lloyd George
- Preceded by: F. E. Smith
- Succeeded by: Ernest Pollock

Solicitor General for England and Wales
- In office 10 December 1916 – 10 January 1919
- Monarch: George V
- Prime Minister: David Lloyd George
- Preceded by: Sir George Cave
- Succeeded by: Sir Ernest Pollock

Member of the House of Lords Lord Temporal
- In office 24 March 1922 – 5 May 1943; Hereditary peerage
- Preceded by: Peerage created
- Succeeded by: Hugh Hewart

Member of Parliament for Leicester East Leicester (1913–18)
- In office 27 June 1913 – 24 March 1922
- Preceded by: Eliot Crawshay-Williams
- Succeeded by: George Banton

Personal details
- Born: Gordon Hewart; 7 January 1870 Bury, Lancashire, England, UK
- Died: 5 May 1943 (aged 73) Totteridge, Hertfordshire, England, UK
- Party: Liberal (Before 1916, 1923–1943)
- Other political affiliations: Coalition Liberal (1916–1922); National Liberal (1922–1923)
- Spouses: Sarah Riley (m. 1892; died 1933) Jean Stewart (m. 1934)
- Children: 2
- Parents: Giles Hewart (father); Annie Jones (mother)
- Education: Bury Grammar School and Manchester Grammar School
- Alma mater: University College, Oxford
- Occupation: Journalist and Barrister

Gordon Hewart, 1st Viscount Hewart, PC (7 January 1870 – 5 May 1943) was a politician and judge in the United Kingdom.

== Early life and career ==
Hewart was born in Bury, Lancashire, the eldest son of Giles Hewart, a draper, and Annie Elizabeth Jones. He was educated at Bury Grammar School, Manchester Grammar School and University College, Oxford.

Hewart began his career as a journalist for the Manchester Guardian and the Morning Leader. He was called to the bar at the Inner Temple in 1902, joining the Northern Circuit. He took silk in 1912.

== Political career ==
He was a Liberal Member of Parliament for Leicester from 1913, and, after the constituency was divided in 1918, Leicester East. An advanced Liberal, he was appointed Solicitor General in 1916, receiving the customary knighthood, and was sworn of the Privy Council in 1918. He was Attorney General from 10 January 1919 to 6 March 1922. He was given a seat in the Cabinet in 1921 where he served as a British delegate during the negotiations leading up to the Anglo-Irish Treaty.

While in office, he refused offers to become Chief Secretary for Ireland or Home Secretary; at the time, the Attorney General had the right of first refusal for the post of Lord Chief Justice, which was Hewart's ambition.

=== Lord Chief Justice ===
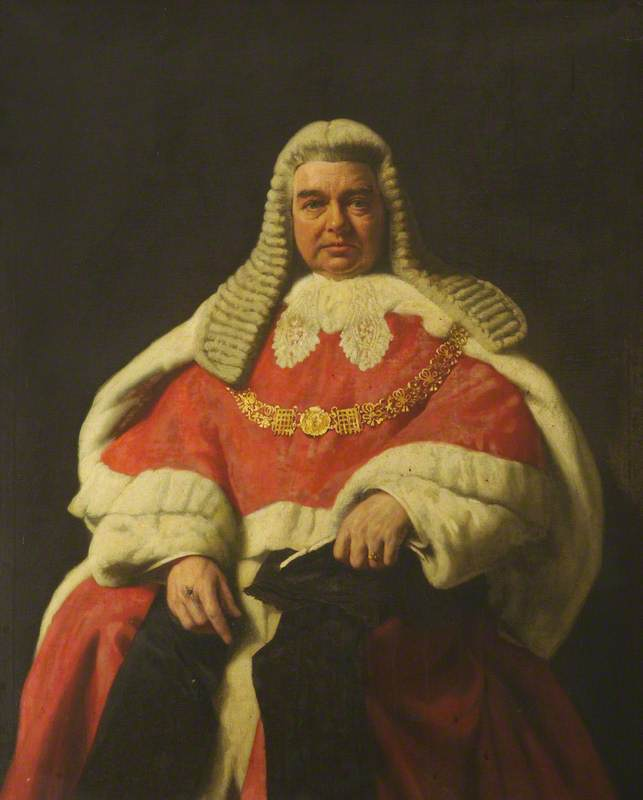
Hewart as Lord Chief Justice, by John St Helier Lander.

On the resignation of the Earl of Reading as Lord Chief Justice of England in 1921, Hewart asked to succeed him. However, David Lloyd George was reluctant to lose him, and, as a compromise, the 77-year-old Sir A. T. Lawrence (Lord Trevethin from August 1921) was appointed instead as a stop-gap; he was required to furnish an undated letter of resignation to Lloyd George, an arrangement which scandalised many: Lord Birkenhead thought it 'illegal', while judges boycotted the farewell ceremony for Lord Reading.

On 3 March 1922, Trevethin 'resigned' (an event which he learned from The Times), and Hewart was duly appointed Lord Chief Justice of England on 8 March 1922, and was elevated to the peerage as Baron Hewart, of Bury, in the County of Lancaster on 24 March 1922.

In May 1922 Hewart was closely involved in the drafting of the Constitution of the Irish Free State. He worked closely with his Irish counterpart, Hugh Kennedy in May 1922 to finalise the text in time for elections the following month.

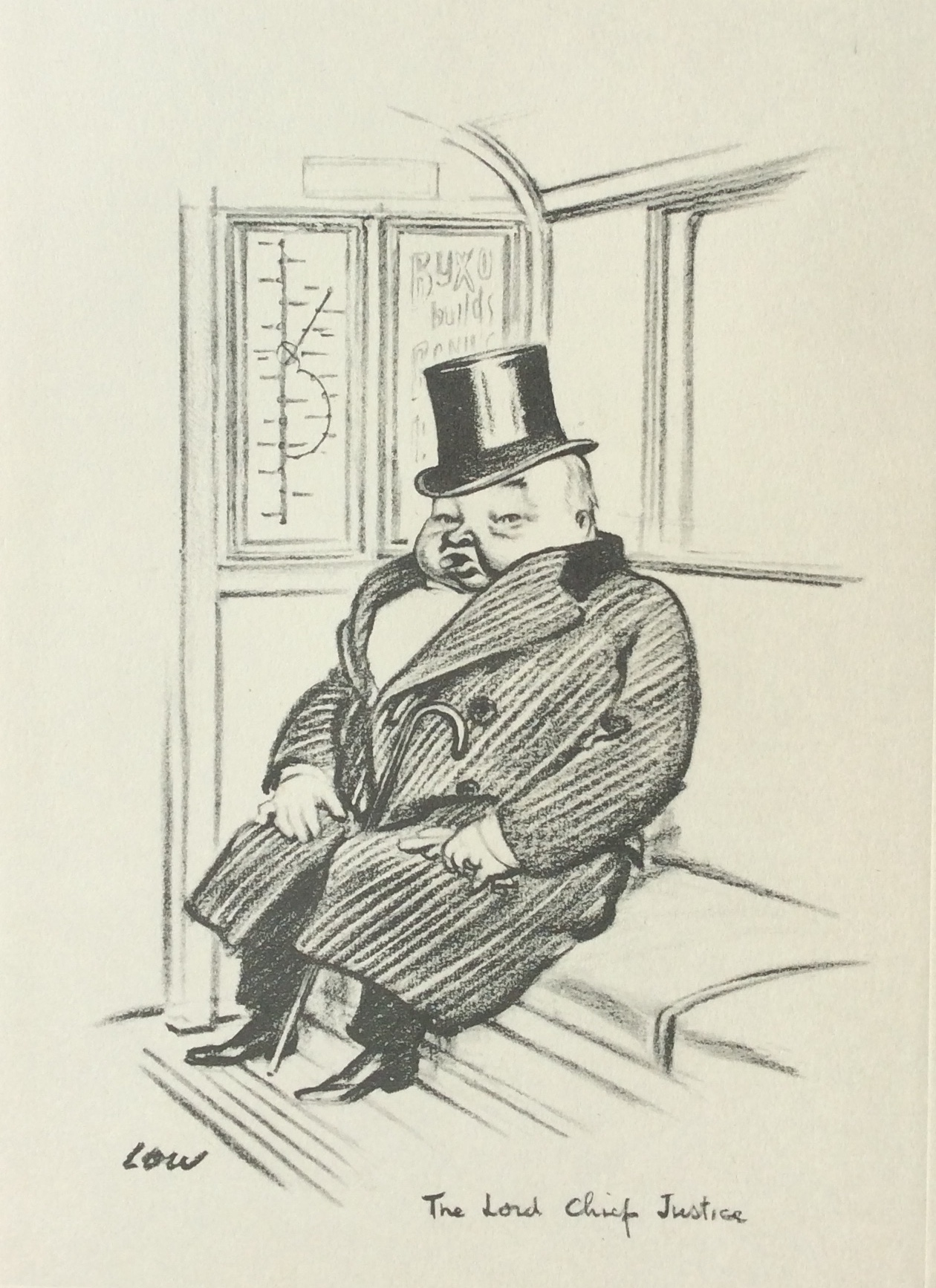
The Lord Chief Justice by David Low 1926

In 1929, Hewart published The New Despotism, in which he asserted that the rule of law in Britain was being undermined by the executive at the expense of the legislature and the courts. This book was very controversial and led to the appointment of a Committee on Ministers' Powers—chaired by the Earl of Donoughmore—but its Report rejected Hewart's arguments.

He has been described as "one of the most vigorous and vociferous believers in the impeccability of the English jury system of this or any other century". However, in 1931, Hewart made legal history, when (sitting with Mr Justice Branson and Mr Justice Hawke) he quashed the conviction for murder of William Herbert Wallace, on the grounds that the conviction could not be supported by the evidence. In other words, the jury was wrong.

Lord Hewart was the originator (paraphrased from the original) of the aphorism "Not only must Justice be done; it must also be seen to be done."

In 1940, Hewart was asked by telephone by 10 Downing Street to resign; he duly did so on 12 October 1940. On his retirement, he was created Viscount Hewart, of Bury in the County Palatine of Lancaster, on 1 November 1940.

== Personal life ==
Lord Hewart married twice; first in 1892 Sarah Wood Riley, daughter of J. H. Riley and secondly in 1934, Jean Stewart, the daughter of J. R. Stewart. With his first wife he had a daughter Katharine and a son and heir, Hugh. When he died in Totteridge, on 5 May 1943, his titles were inherited by his son, Hugh Hewart, 2nd Viscount Hewart.

== Death ==
He died 5 May 1943 in the Garden Hill House, Totteridge, Barnet, Hertfordshire, aged 73.

== Arms ==
Coat of arms of Gordon Hewart, 1st Viscount Hewart
Crest In front of the trunk of a tree sprouting thereon an owl Proper three crosses patée fesswise Or. Escutcheon Argent on a fess Sable between two owls Proper in chief and in base a cross patée of the second a fasces Or. Supporters On either side an owl Proper charged with a fasces erect Or. Motto Nulla Retrorsum.

== Notable decisions ==
- Rex v Sussex Justices, ex parte McCarthy
- Rex v Wallace

== Notes ==
Parliament of the United Kingdom
Preceded by Eliot Crawshay-Williams and Ramsay MacDonald	Member of Parliament for Leicester; 1913–1918; With: Ramsay MacDonald	Constituency abolished
New constituency	Member of Parliament for Leicester East; 1918–1922	Succeeded by George Banton
Legal offices
Preceded by Sir George Cave	Solicitor General for England and Wales; 1916–1919	Succeeded by Sir Ernest Pollock
Preceded by Sir F. E. Smith	Attorney General for England and Wales; 1919–1922	Succeeded by Sir Ernest Pollock
Preceded by The Lord Trevethin	Lord Chief Justice of England; 1922–1940	Succeeded by The Viscount Caldecote
Peerage of the United Kingdom
New creation	Viscount Hewart; 1940–1943	Succeeded by Hugh Hewart
New creation	Baron Hewart; 1922–1943	Succeeded by Hugh Hewart
