= Viscount Hewart =

Extinct viscountcy in the Peerage of the United Kingdom

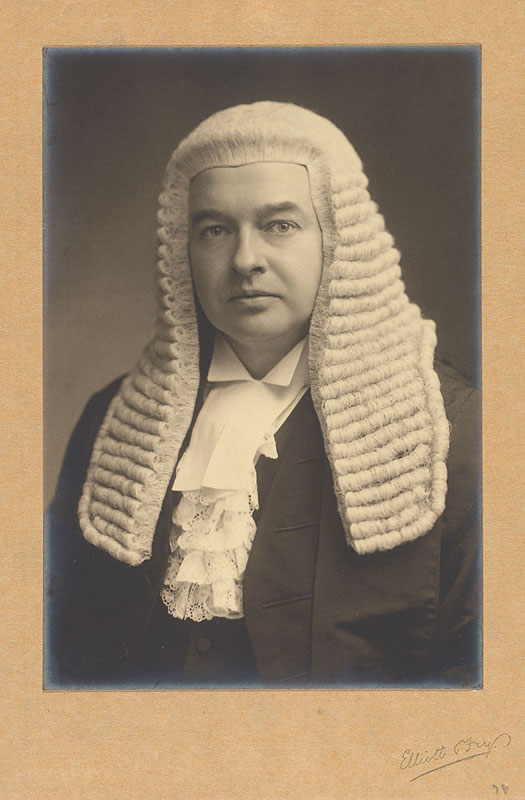
Gordon Hewart, 1st Viscount Hewart.

Viscount Hewart, of Bury in the County Palatine of Lancaster, was a title in the Peerage of the United Kingdom. It was created in 1940 for Gordon Hewart, 1st Baron Hewart, on his retirement as Lord Chief Justice. He had already been created Baron Hewart, of Bury in the County of Lancaster, in 1922, also in the Peerage of the United Kingdom. He was educated at Bury Grammar School. The titles became extinct on the death of his son, the second Viscount, in 1964.

== Viscounts Hewart (1940) ==
- Gordon Hewart, 1st Viscount Hewart (1870–1943)
- Hugh Vaughan Hewart, 2nd Viscount Hewart (1896–1964)

Coat of arms of Viscount Hewart
Crest In front of the trunk of a tree sprouting thereon an owl Proper three crosses patée fesswise Or. Escutcheon Argent on a fess Sable between two owls Proper in chief and in base a cross patée of the second a fasces Or. Supporters On either side an owl Proper charged with a fasces erect Or. Motto Nulla Retrorsum.
