= Baron Sanderson =

Extinct barony in the Peerage of the United Kingdom

Baron Sanderson was a title created twice in the Peerage of the United Kingdom. The first creation came on 20 December 1905 when the civil servant Sir Thomas Sanderson was made Baron Sanderson, of Armthorpe in the County of York. He was Permanent Under-Secretary of State for Foreign Affairs between 1894 and 1896. Sanderson was the second son of Richard Sanderson, Conservative Member of Parliament for Colchester. The title became extinct on his death on 21 March 1923. The second creation came on 18 June 1930 when the noted academic Henry Sanderson Furniss was made Baron Sanderson, of Hunmanby in the County of York. The title became extinct on his death on 25 March 1939.

== Barons Sanderson, first creation (1905) ==
- Thomas Henry Sanderson, 1st Baron Sanderson (1841–1923)

== Barons Sanderson, second creation (1930) ==
- Henry Sanderson Furniss, 1st Baron Sanderson (1868–1939)

== See also ==
- Baron Sanderson of Ayot
