= Hely-Hutchinson =

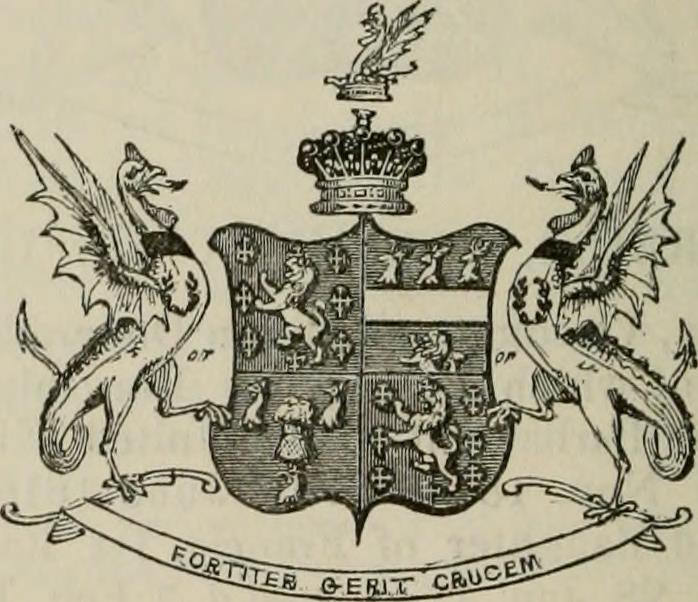
Earls of Donoughmore crest

The name Hely-Hutchinson or Hely Hutchinson may refer to:

- The Family name of the Earls of Donoughmore:
  - Christiana Hely-Hutchinson, 1st Baroness Donoughmore (died 1788), Irish peer
  - Richard Hely-Hutchinson, 1st Earl of Donoughmore (1756–1825), Irish peer
  - John Hely-Hutchinson, 2nd Earl of Donoughmore (1757–1832), Anglo-Irish politician
  - John Hely-Hutchinson, 3rd Earl of Donoughmore (1787–1851), Irish politician
  - Richard Hely-Hutchinson, 4th Earl of Donoughmore (1823–1856), British politician
  - John Hely-Hutchinson, 5th Earl of Donoughmore (1848–1900), British peer
  - Richard Hely-Hutchinson, 6th Earl of Donoughmore (1875–1948), Irish peer
  - John Hely-Hutchinson, 7th Earl of Donoughmore (1902–1981), British politician
  - Michael Hely-Hutchinson, 8th Earl of Donoughmore (1927–2025), Irish peer

Other

- John Hely-Hutchinson (1724–1794), Irish lawyer and statesman
- Francis Hely-Hutchinson (1769–1827), Irish Member of Parliament
- Maurice Hely-Hutchinson (1887–1961), British Conservative politician
- Nicholas Hely Hutchinson, British painter
- Tim Hely Hutchinson, British publisher
- Victor Hely-Hutchinson (1901–1947), British composer
- Walter Hely-Hutchinson (1849–1913), Anglo-Irish diplomat

As a given name

- Hely Hutchinson Almond (1832–1903) Scottish physician and politician
