= Coote Synge-Hutchinson =

British Army officer (1832–1902)

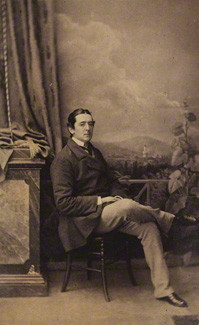
- Synge-Hutchinson, albumen print, early 1860s
- Born: 7 August 1832; Dublin, Ireland
- Died: 13 February 1902 (aged 69)
- Military career
- Allegiance: British Army
- Branch: United Kingdom
- Rank: Lieutenant-General
- Conflicts: Indian Rebellion of 1857

Lieutenant-General Coote Synge-Hutchinson (7 August 1832 – 13 February 1902) was a British Army officer.

== Military career ==
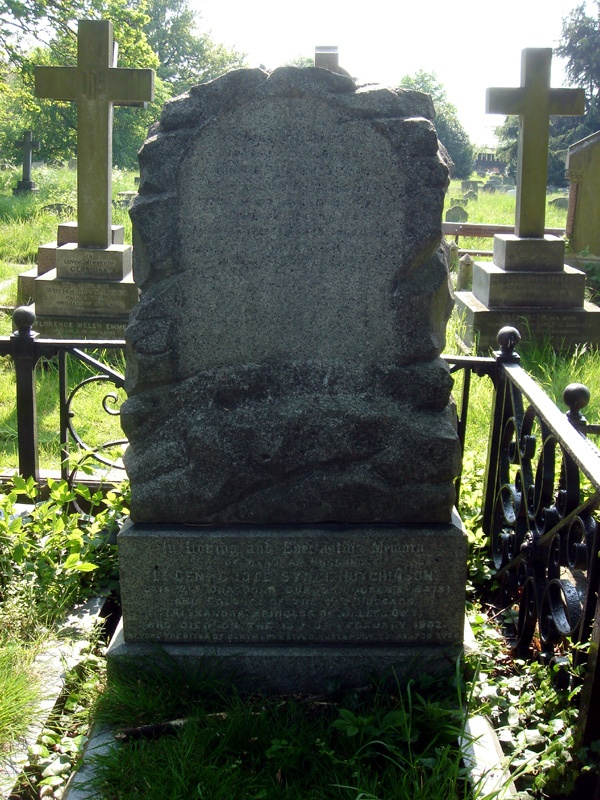
Funerary monument, Brompton Cemetery, London

He was born in Dublin, Ireland, the son of Francis Synge-Hutchinson and Lady Louisa Frances Synge-Hutchinson, daughter of Hon. Francis Hely-Hutchinson and sister of the Earl of Donoughmore.

Synge-Hutchinson, of the 2nd Dragoon Guards, was awarded the Indian Mutiny Medal, with Lucknow clasp, for service with the 2nd Dragoon Guards (Queen's Bays).

He was later promoted to Lieutenant General and became Honorary Colonel of the 19th Royal Hussars from 24 March 1899 to 13 February 1902.

His nephew was Colonel Edward Douglas Brown VC.

In 1888, at the age of 56, he married a widow Emily Charlotte Jecks. She had children including Phyllis who became a noted actress under the name Phyllis Broughton. He and Emily raised a daughter, Haidee. However, as they were not married until five years after her birth, she was registered under her mother's previous husband's surname in 1883. He and his wife and their daughter went to live at India House, which was the best house in Ramsgate, and owned by his successful step daughter, Phyllis Broughton.

In 2007 Coote Synge-Hutchinson's descendants sold his Indian Mutiny Medal and a VC Ribbon Bar which had been awarded to his nephew Edward Douglas Brown at auction. Together the pieces brought in £2,128.
