= Richard Hely-Hutchinson, 1st Earl of Donoughmore =

Irish peer and politician (1756–1825)

Richard Hely-Hutchinson
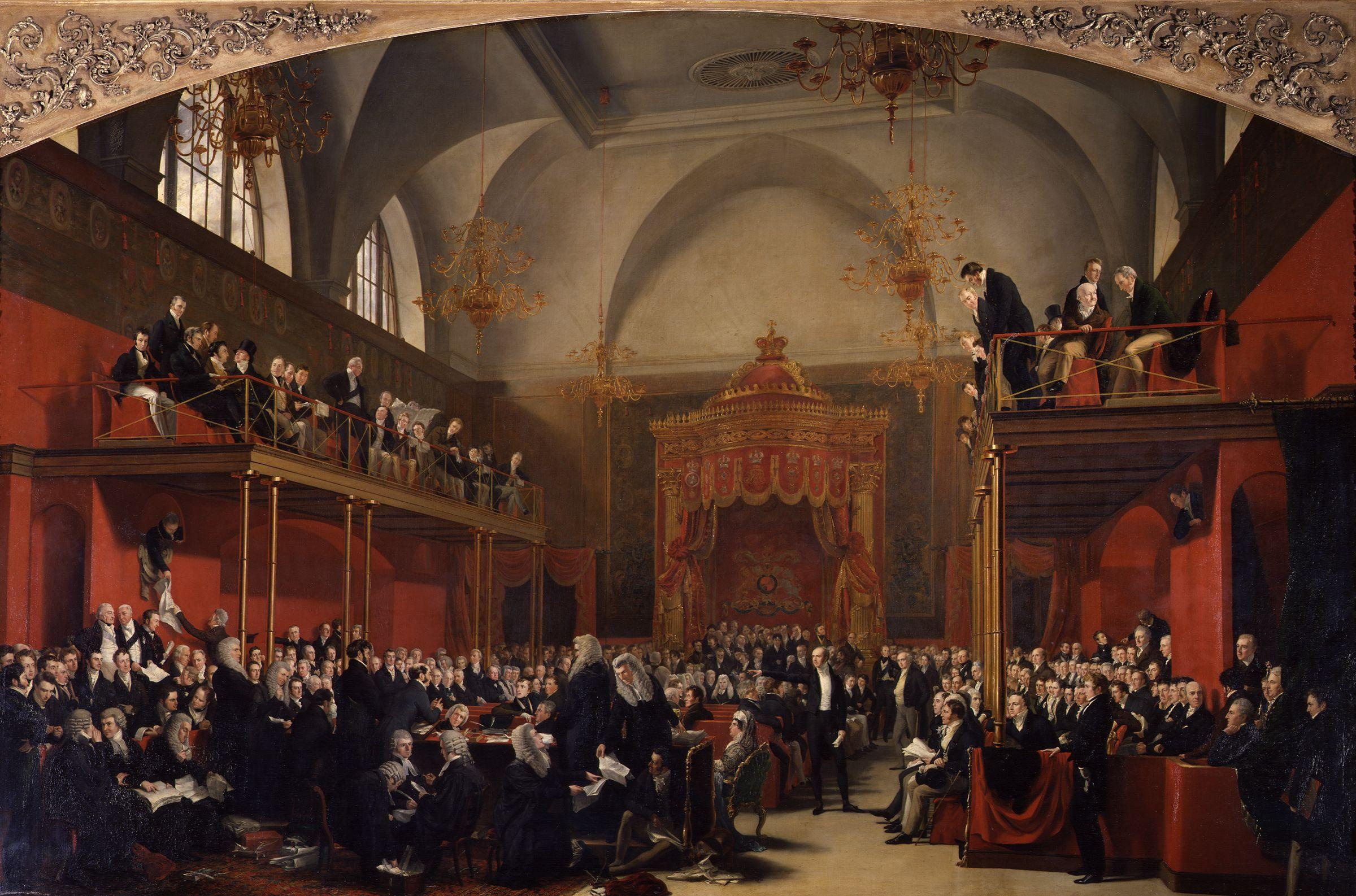
- Hely-Hutchinson in Hayter's The Trial of Queen Caroline (1823)

Representative peer for Ireland
- In office 1800–1825

Grandmaster of the Grand Lodge of Ireland
- In office 1789–1813

Member of Parliament for Taghmon
- In office 1783–1788

MP for Sligo
- In office 1776–1783

Member of Parliament for Dublin University
- In office 1776–1778

Personal details
- Born: 29 January 1756
- Died: 22 August 1825 (aged 69)
- Parent(s): John Hely-Hutchinson and Christiana Hely-Hutchinson

Richard Hely Hely-Hutchinson, 1st Earl of Donoughmore (29 January 1756 – 22 August 1825), styled The Honourable Richard Hely-Hutchinson from 1783 to 1788, was an Irish peer and politician.

== Biography ==
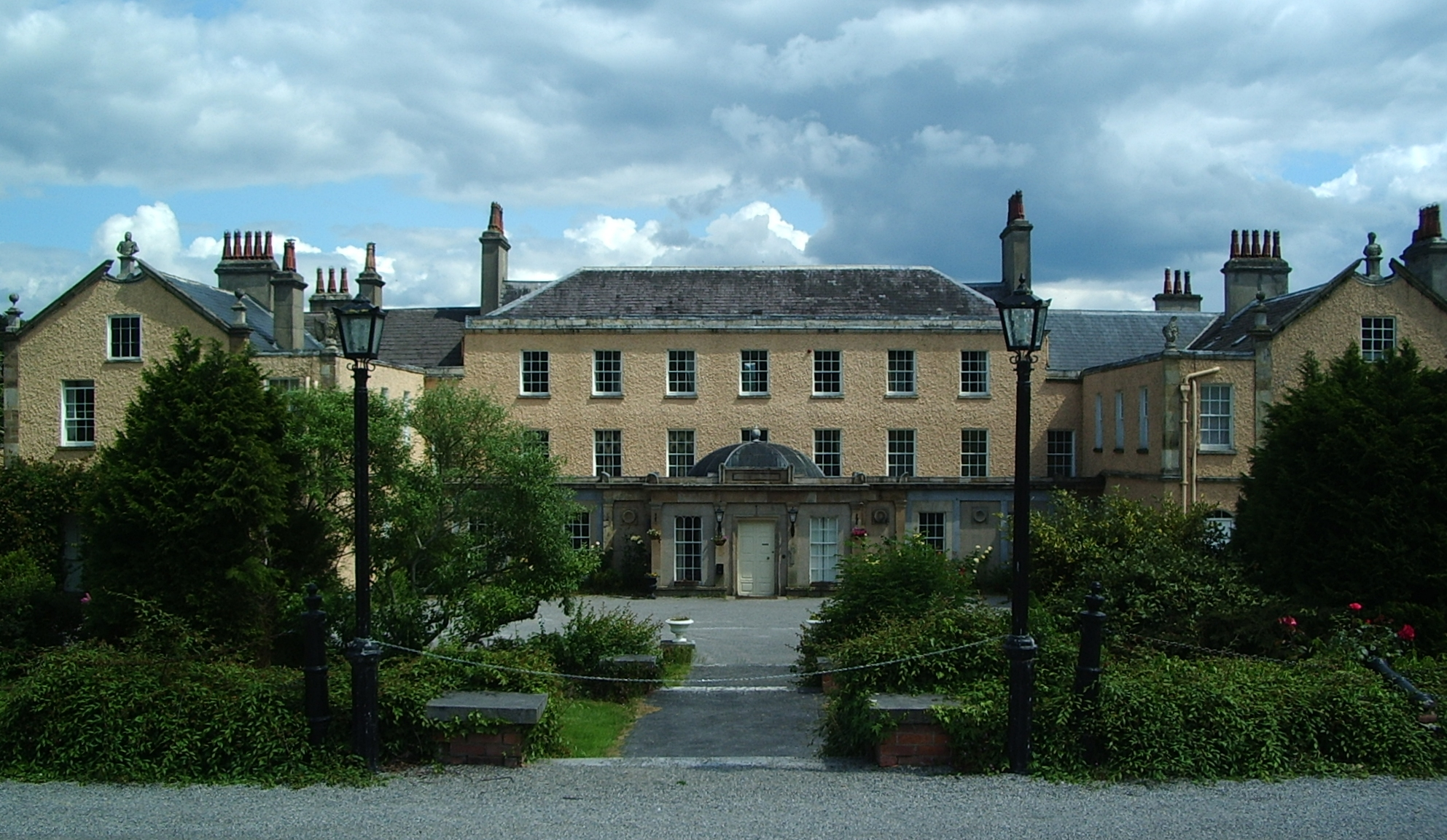
Knocklofty House, Clonmel, Co. Tipperary

He was the son of Rt. Hon. John Hely-Hutchinson and Christiana Hely-Hutchinson, 1st Baroness Donoughmore. In 1776, he stood as Member of Parliament in the Irish House of Commons for two different constituencies. He sat for Dublin University to 1778 and Sligo to 1783. Subsequently, he represented Taghmon, County Wexford, from 1783 until 1788, when he succeeded to his mother's title. In 1789, he was elected Grandmaster of the Grand Lodge of Ireland, a post he held until 1813.

He commissioned the building c.1790 of the Georgian style Knocklofty House near Clonmel in County Tipperary. He was created Viscount Donoughmore, of Knocklofty, Co. Tipperary (Peerage of Ireland), on 20 November 1797, with a special remainder to his mother's male descendants and, in 1800, Earl of Donoughmore. He was one of the original 28 Irish Representative peers and an advocate of Roman Catholic emancipation. He was created, in 1821, Viscount Hutchinson (in the Peerage of the United Kingdom) and thus gained an hereditary seat in the House of Lords.

He held the office of Governor of Tipperary and of Lord Treasurer's Remembrancer Court of Exchequer (Ireland). He gained the rank of Lieutenant-General.

Parliament of Ireland
Preceded by Philip Tisdall; Sir Capel Molyneux, 3rd Bt	Member of Parliament for Dublin University; 1776–1778; With: Walter Hussey-Burgh	Succeeded by Walter Hussey-Burgh; John FitzGibbon
Preceded by John Wynne; William Ormsby	Member of Parliament for Sligo; 1776–1783; With: Owen Wynne	Succeeded by Owen Wynne; John Foster
Preceded by Thomas Pigott; William Alexander English	Member of Parliament for Taghmon; 1783–1788; With: Dudley Hussey 1783–1786; Robert Stubber 1786–1788	Succeeded by Robert Stubber; Hon. John Hely-Hutchinson
Masonic offices
Preceded by The Viscount Glerawley	Grandmaster of the Grand Lodge of Ireland; 1789–1813	Succeeded by The Duke of Leinster
Parliament of the United Kingdom
New title	Representative peer for Ireland; 1800–1825	Succeeded by The Lord Farnham
Peerage of Ireland
New creation	Earl of Donoughmore; 1800–1825	Succeeded by John Hely-Hutchinson
New creation	Viscount Donoughmore; 1797–1825	Succeeded by John Hely-Hutchinson
Preceded by Christiana Hely-Hutchinson	Baron Donoughmore; 1788–1825	Succeeded by John Hely-Hutchinson
Peerage of the United Kingdom
New creation	Viscount Hutchinson; 1821–1825	Succeeded by John Hely-Hutchinson
