= Anatole, baron Brénier de Renaudière =

French diplomat and politician

Baron Anatole Brénier de Renaudière
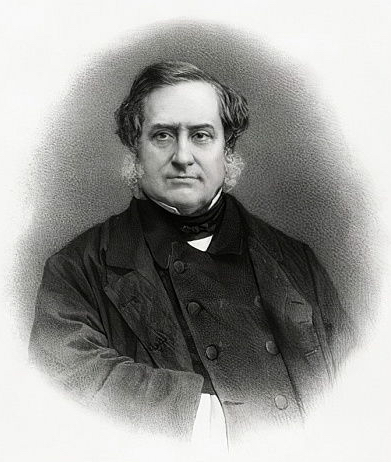
- Anatole Brénier de Renaudière

Minister of Foreign Affairs
- In office 24 January 1851 – 10 April 1851
- Preceded by: Édouard Drouyn de Lhuys
- Succeeded by: Jules Baroche

Senator of France
- In office 24 May 1861 – 27 March 1885

Personal details
- Born: 22 August 1807 Paris, France
- Died: 27 March 1885 (aged 77) Vouvray, Indre-et-Loire, France
- Spouse: Isabelle Unwina Hely Hutchinson
- Occupation: Diplomat, politician

Anatole Alexandre François Henri Baron Brenier de Renaudière (22 August 1807, Paris – 27 March 1885 La Lucassière (Vouvray, Indre-et-Loire)) was a French diplomat and politician.

After being secretary in London and Lisbon, he became consul of France in Warsaw after the death of Raymond Durand (1837), and was later general consul in Florence.

In 1847, he took his father's succession as Director of Finances (Directeur des Fonds et de la Comptabilité) of the Ministry of Foreign Affairs.

He was chosen by Louis Napoléon Bonaparte as Foreign Minister from 24 January to 10 April 1851.

He was ambassador of France to Naples up to the Garibaldian invasion.

He then became a senator on 24 May 1861.

He had married Isabelle Unwina Hely Hutchinson.

== Link ==
- Anciens sénateurs du Second Empire (in French)

Political offices
Preceded by Édouard Drouyn de Lhuys	Minister of Foreign Affairs; 24 January 1851 – 10 April 1851	Succeeded by Jules Baroche
