= John Hely-Hutchinson, 2nd Earl of Donoughmore =

British Army officer and politician (1757–1832)

General The Right Honourable The Earl of Donoughmore GCB
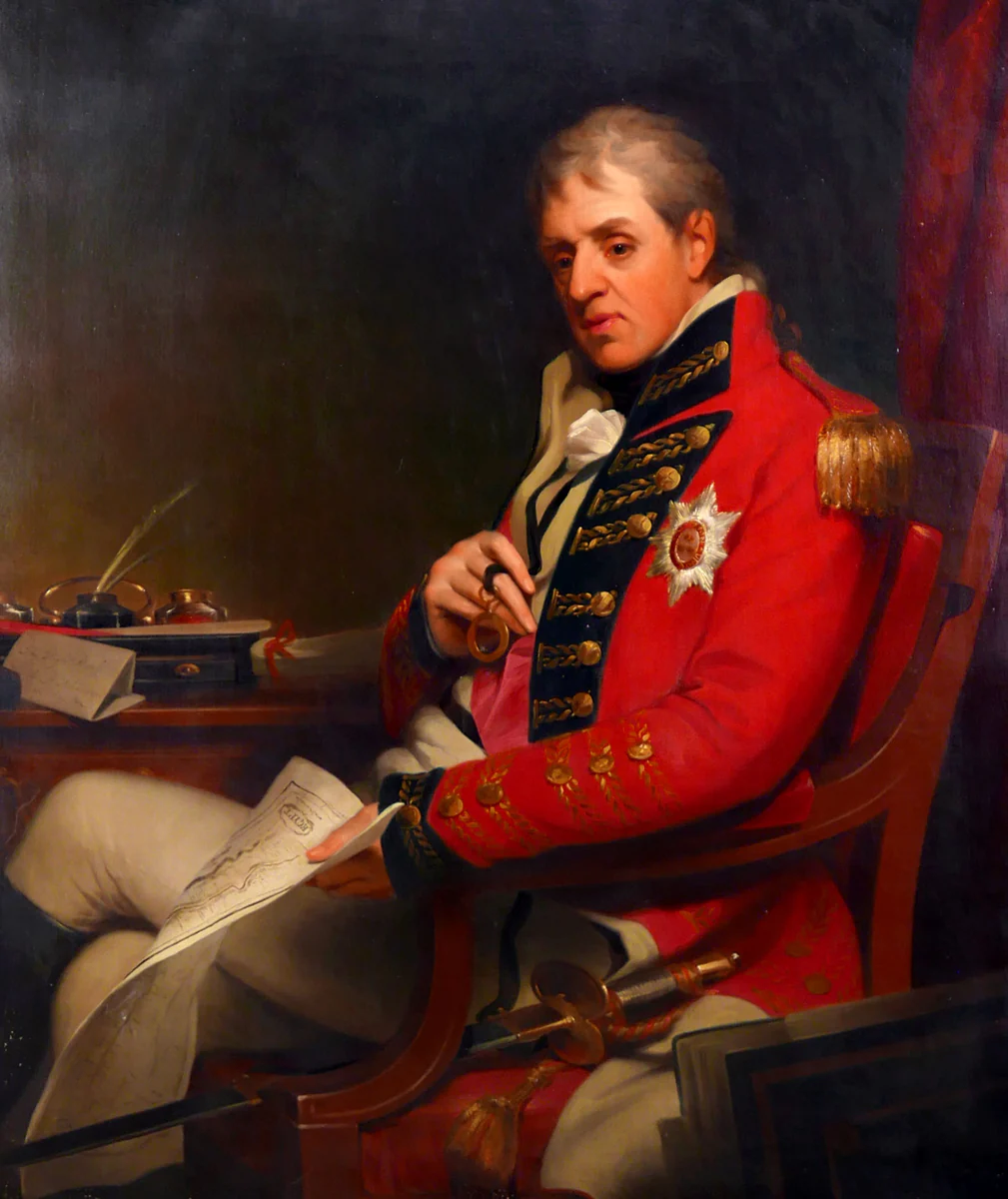
- Portrait by William Robinson, 1827
- Born: 15 May 1757; Dublin, Ireland
- Died: 29 June 1832 (aged 75); Knocklofty House, County Tipperary, Ireland

General John Hely-Hutchinson, 2nd Earl of Donoughmore, GCB (15 May 1757 – 29 June 1832) was an Irish soldier and politician. He served for many years in the British Army, most notably as commander in the Egyptian campaign when he forced a French army to surrender at the Siege of Alexandria in 1801, ending Napoleon's ambitions in Egypt.

== Background ==
He was the son of John Hely-Hutchinson and the Baroness Donoughmore. In 1801 he was created Baron Hutchinson in the Peerage of the United Kingdom (gaining a seat in the House of Lords) and later succeeded to all his brother Richard's titles. He was educated at Eton College, Magdalen College, Oxford, and Trinity College, Dublin. He died 29 June 1832, never having married.

== Military career ==
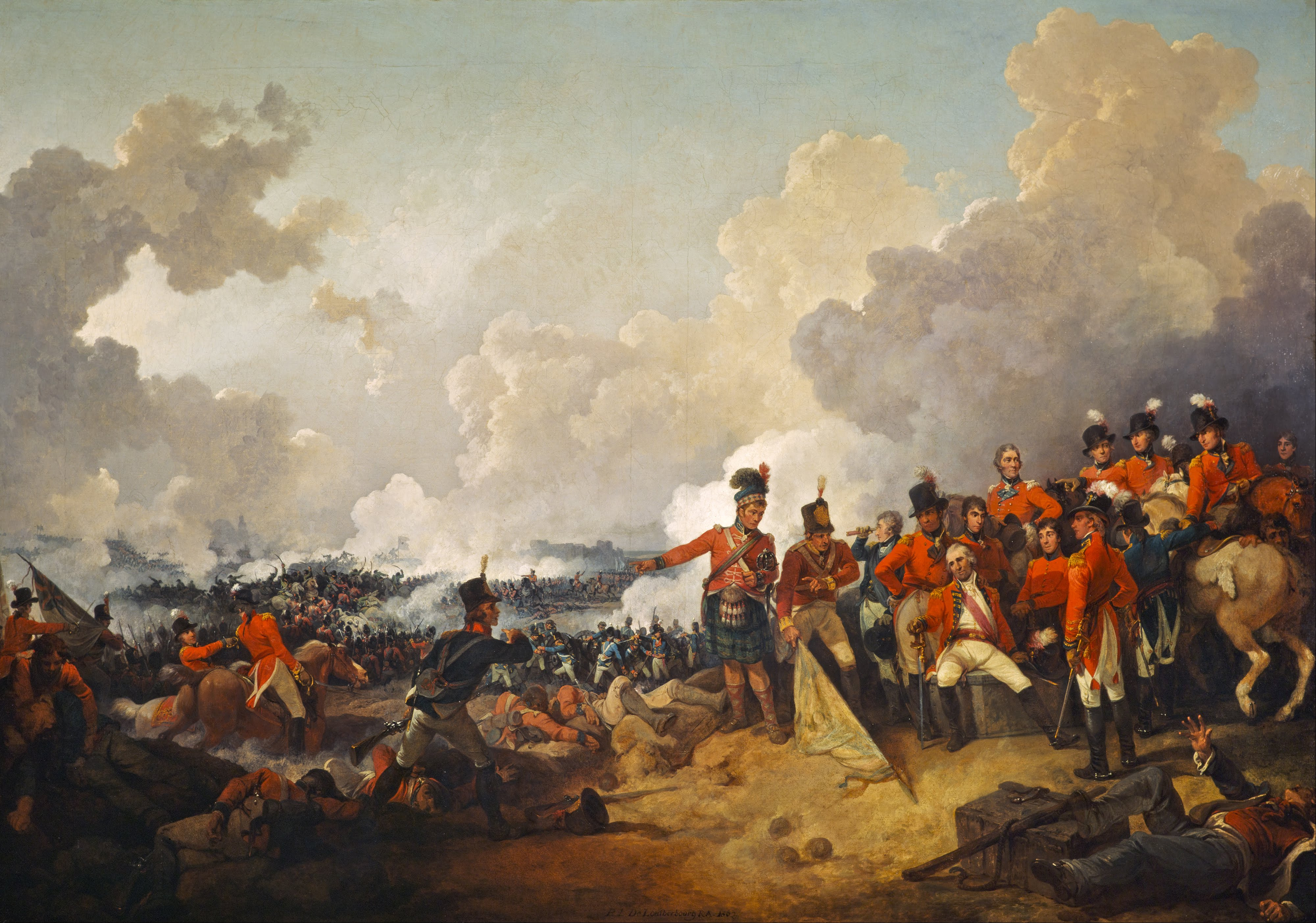
The Battle of Alexandria by Philip James de Loutherbourg. Following Sir Ralph Abercromby's fatal wound at the battle, Hely-Hutchinson took command of British forces for the remainder of the Egyptian Campaign.

He entered the Army as a cornet in the 18th Dragoons in 1774, rising to a lieutenant the next year. In 1776 he was promoted to become a captain in the 67th Regiment of Foot, and a major there in 1781. He moved regiments again in 1783, becoming a lieutenant-colonel in, and colonel-commandant of, the 77th Regiment of Foot, which was, however, disbanded shortly afterwards following an earlier mutiny. He spent the next 11 years on half-pay, studying military tactics in France before serving as a volunteer in the Flanders campaigns of 1793 as aide-de-camp to Sir Ralph Abercromby.

In March 1794 he obtained brevet promotion to colonel and the colonelcy of the old 94th Regiment of Foot and then became a major-general in May 1796, serving in Ireland during the Irish Rebellion of 1798, where he was second-in-command at the Battle of Castlebar under General Lake. In 1799, he was in the expedition to the Netherlands.

Hely-Hutchinson was second-in-command of the 1801 expedition to Egypt, under Abercromby. Following Abercromby's death in March after being wounded at the Battle of Alexandria, Hely-Hutchinson took command of the force. From then he was able to besiege the French firstly at Cairo which capitulated in June and then besieged and took Alexandria culminating in the capitulation of over 22,000 French soldiers. In reward for his successes there, the Ottoman Sultan Selim III made him a Knight, 1st Class, of the Order of the Crescent.

In recognition of his "eminent services" during the "late glorious and successful campaign in Egypt", at the request of the King, the United Kingdom Parliament settled on Lord Hutchinson and the next two succeeding heirs male of his body an annuity of £2,000 per annum, paid out of the Consolidated Fund.

Annuity to Lord Hutchinson, etc. Act 1802
- Act of Parliament
- Parliament of the United Kingdom
- Long title: An Act for settling and securing a certain Annuity on Lord Hutchinson, Baron Hutchinson of Alexandria, and of Knocklofty, in the County of Tipperary, and the Two next Persons to whom the Title of Baron Hutchinson shall descend, in consideration of his eminent Services.
- Citation: 42 Geo. 3. c. 113

Dates
- Royal assent: 26 June 1802
- Commencement: 2 September 1802 (Note: Section 1.)
- Expired: 29 June 1832
- Repealed: 6 August 1872
Other legislation
Repealed by	Statute Law Revision Act 1872

Status: Repealed

Text of statute as originally enacted

He was promoted lieutenant-general in September 1803, and made Governor of Stirling Castle. In March 1802 he was made Colonel in Chief of the 74th (Highland) Regiment of Foot.

He was made a full general in June 1813. In 1806, he became Colonel in Chief of the 57th (West Middlesex) Regiment of Foot, transferring in 1811 to be Colonel in Chief of the 18th Regiment of Foot, a position he held until his death in 1832. He also held the position of Governor of Stirling Castle from 1806 until his death.

== Political career ==
Hely-Hutchinson sat as Member of Parliament (MP) for Lanesborough from 1776 to 1783 and for Taghmon from 1789 to 1790. Subsequently, he represented Cork City in the Irish House of Commons until the Act of Union in 1801 and was then MP for Cork City in the after-Union Parliament of the United Kingdom until 1802.

== Bibliography ==
- The Royal Military Calendar, Or Army Service and Commission Book, ed. John Philippart. p. 1, Vol II of V, 3rd edition, London, 1820. Online edition at Google Books
- Parliamentary Election Results in Ireland, 1801-1922, edited by B. M. Walker (Royal Irish Academy 1978)
- Dictionary of National Biography entry

Parliament of Ireland
Preceded by Edward Bellingham Swan; Matthias Earbery	Member of Parliament for Lanesborough; 1776–1783; With: Robert Dillon	Succeeded by Robert Dillon; David La Touche
Preceded by Robert Stubber; Hon. Richard Hely-Hutchinson	Member of Parliament for Taghmon; 1789–1790; With: Robert Stubber	Succeeded by John Hely-Hutchinson; Warden Flood
Preceded by John Hely-Hutchinson; Augustus Louis Carre Warren	Member of Parliament for Cork City; 1790–1801; With: Richard Longfield 1790–1796; William Hare 1796–1797; Mountifort Longfield 1797–1801	Succeeded by Parliament of the United Kingdom
Parliament of the United Kingdom
New constituency	Member of Parliament for Cork City; 1801–1802; With: Mountifort Longfield	Succeeded by Mountifort Longfield; Christopher Hely-Hutchinson
Military offices
Preceded by Charles O'Hara	Colonel of the 74th (Highland) Regiment of Foot; 1802–1806	Succeeded by Sir John Stuart
Preceded by John Hale	Governor of Londonderry; 1806	Succeeded by The Earl of Suffolk
Preceded by John Campbell	Colonel of the 57th (West Middlesex) Regiment of Foot; 1806–1811	Succeeded by Sir Hew Dalrymple
Preceded by Sir James Murray-Pulteney, Bt	Colonel of the 18th (The Royal Irish) Regiment of Foot; 1811–1832	Succeeded by The Lord Aylmer
Honorary titles
New title	Lord Lieutenant of Tipperary; 1831–1832	Succeeded by The Earl of Donoughmore
Peerage of Ireland
Preceded by Richard Hely-Hutchinson	Earl of Donoughmore; 1825–1832	Succeeded by John Hely-Hutchinson
Peerage of the United Kingdom
Preceded by Richard Hely-Hutchinson	Viscount Hutchinson; 1825–1832	Succeeded by John Hely-Hutchinson
New creation	Baron Hutchinson; 1801–1832	Extinct
