= Caesar Colclough (died 1726) =

Member of Parliament for Taghmon in Ireland

Caesar Colclough (died 1726) was a Member of Parliament for Taghmon (Parliament of Ireland constituency).
