= Lambeth Road =

Road in Lambeth, London

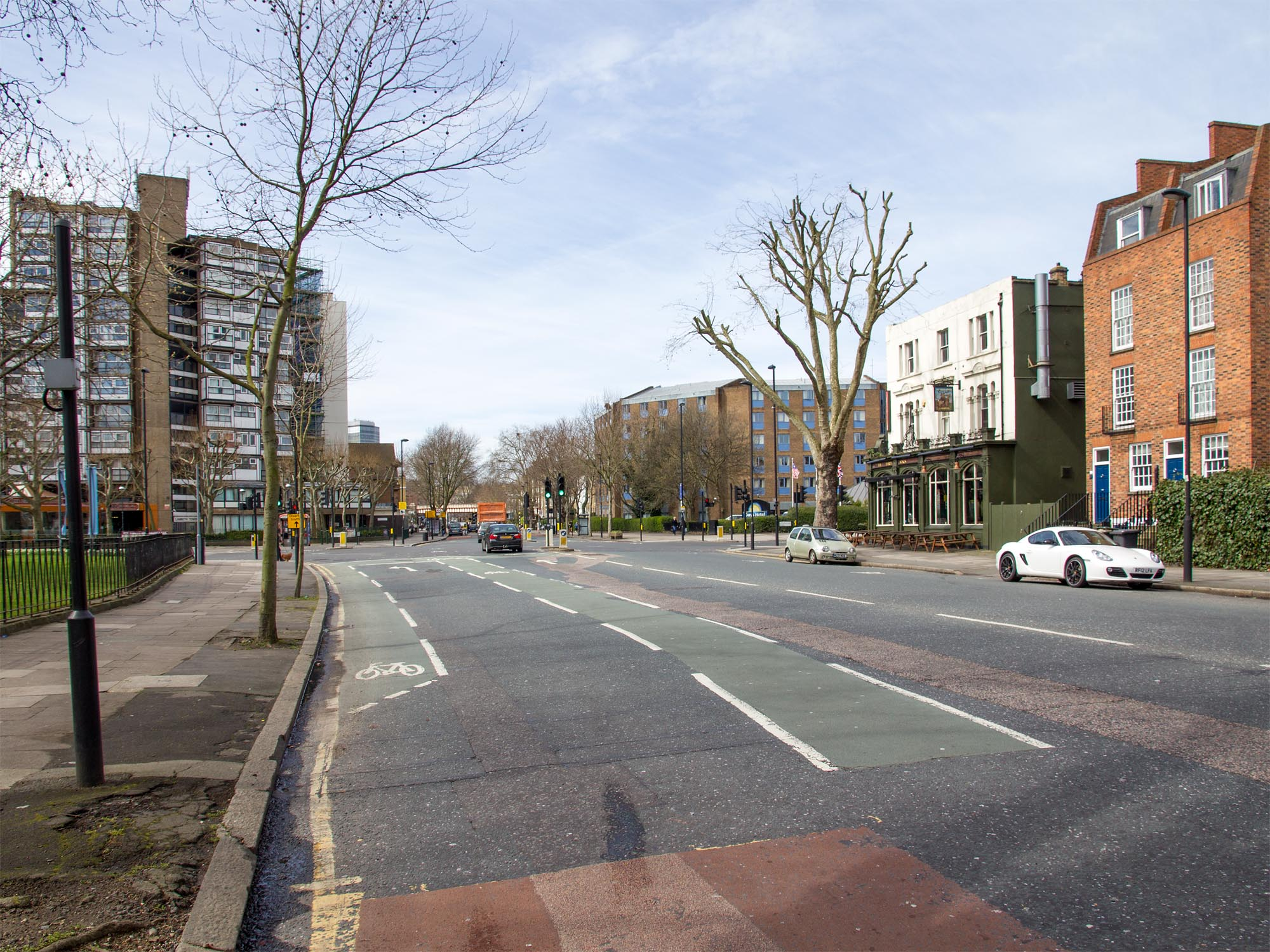
- View along Lambeth Road
- Interactive map of Lambeth Road
- Part of: A3203
- Namesake: Lambeth
- Type: Road
- Location: Lambeth/Southwark, London, England
- Postal code: SE1
- Coordinates: 51°29′44″N 0°06′54″W
- West end: Lambeth Bridge
- Major junctions: Lambeth Walk
- East end: St George's Circus
- North: Hercules Road
- East: Borough Road
- South: Kennington Road
- West: Albert Embankment

Lambeth Road is a road in Lambeth (to the west) and Southwark (to the east), London running between Lambeth Bridge over the River Thames at the western end and St George's Circus at the eastern end. The road is designated the A3203. The borough boundary runs along it from the intersection with King Edward's Walk to Kennington Road.

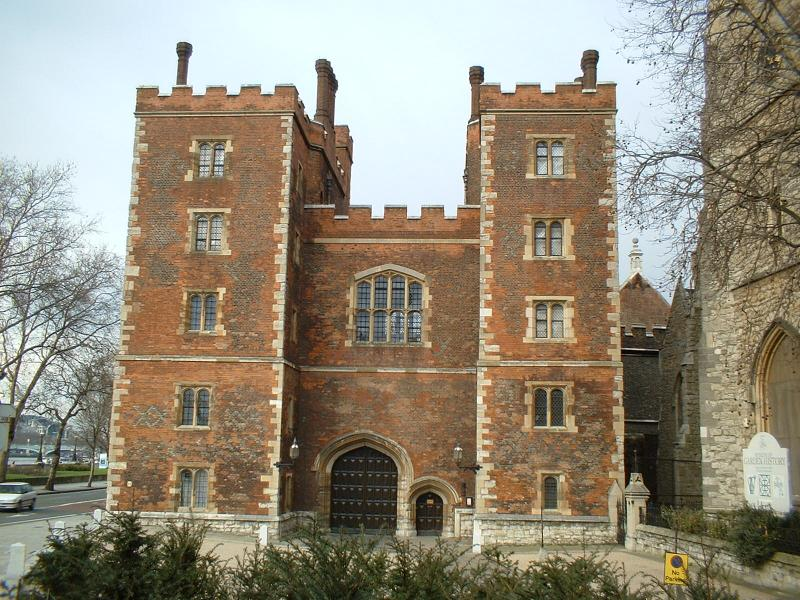
Lambeth Palace's gatehouse on Lambeth Road

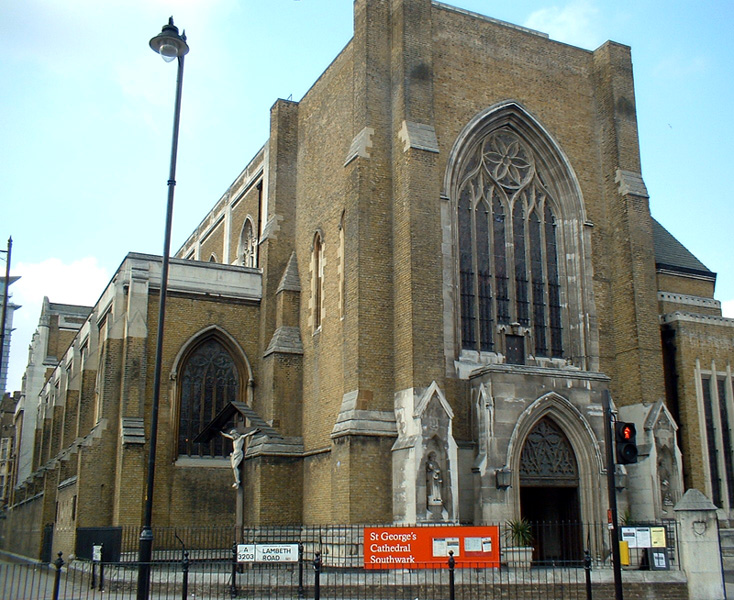
St George's Cathedral main entrance, on the corner of Lambeth Road and St George's Road

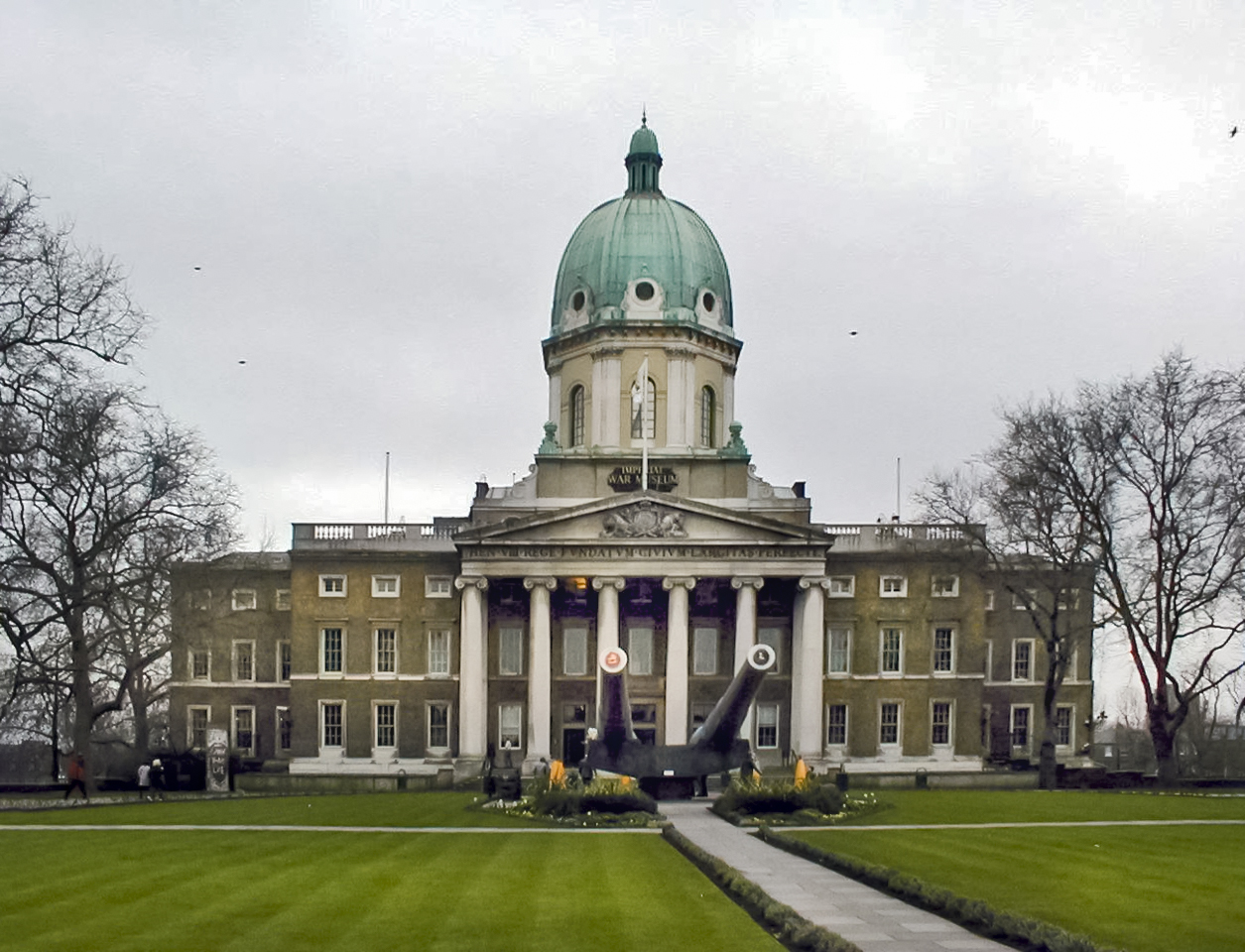
Imperial War Museum on Lambeth Road

Lambeth Palace, the London base of the Archbishop of Canterbury and the Museum of Garden History are to the north, towards the west by the river. St George's Cathedral Southwark is on the north side. Opposite on the south side is the Imperial War Museum, originally the site of the notorious Dog and Duck tavern and later the Bethlem Royal Hospital, the world's oldest psychiatric hospital.

Lambeth Walk adjoins to the south in the middle. Other adjoining roads include the Albert Embankment and Lambeth Palace Road by the river, Kennington Road and St George's Road. Some buildings on Lambeth Road are listed.

The remains of Saint John Jones were displayed on what is now Lambeth Road after his execution in 1598.

The Archbishop Temple's Lambeth Boys' School was erected in 1902–4 on a site given by Archbishop Frederick Temple.

== Notable residents ==
- Archbishops of Canterbury, latterly at Lambeth Palace.
- Elias Ashmole, founder of the Ashmolean Museum in Oxford.
- Philip Astley (1742–1814), built and lived at Hercules Hall, after which Hercules Road is named. He is acknowledged as the 'father of the modern circus'.
- William Blake (1757–1827), the poet and visionary artist, lived in Hercules Road, north of Lambeth Road. The location is marked with a plaque at 23 Hercules Road.
- William Bligh (1754–1817), captain of The Bounty and later an admiral, lived at 100 Lambeth Road.
- Emma Cons, socialist, educationalist and founder of the Old Vic Theatre, and her niece, Lilian Baylis, who re-established the Old Vic and Sadler's Wells, lived at 5–7 Morton Place, off Lambeth Road.
- Sir Ben Greet, the actor-manager, lived at 160 Lambeth Road (1920–36).
- Kevin Spacey (born 1959), artistic director at the Old Vic Theatre nearby, lives in the vicinity.
- John Tradescant the elder and his son of the same name, plant collectors.

See also notable patients of Bethlem hospital, including the artist Richard Dadd.
