= Arthur Browne (1756–1805) =

Irish lawyer, academic, and politician

Arthur Browne (1756 – 8 June 1805) was an Irish lawyer, academic, and politician.

He sat in the House of Commons of Ireland from 1783 until its abolition in 1800, as a Member of Parliament for Dublin University.

== Family and early life ==
Browne was the son of Marmaduke Browne, rector of Trinity Church in Newport, Rhode Island, who in 1761 was appointed one of the original fellows of Rhode Island College, known from 1804 as Brown University. His mother, Anne Franklin of Bristol, died in 1767. His grandfather, the Rev. Arthur Browne, born at Drogheda 1699, was educated at Trinity College Dublin, becoming B.A. 1726 and M.A. 1729. In 1729 he emigrated, at Bishop Berkeley's persuasion, to Rhode Island, and was for six years the minister of Kings Chapel, Providence, and in 1736 he became episcopal minister at Portsmouth, New Hampshire, and died 10 June 1773.

Arthur Browne, the grandson, was educated at a school established in Newport by Dr. Berkeley. His father died from the privations of the voyage almost immediately after his return to Rhode Island from Ireland, whither has had repaired in order to enter his son at Trinity College Dublin. Arthur Browne had previously been entered at Harvard College, Cambridge, Massachusetts, in 1771.

== Career ==
At Trinity College, he gained a scholarship in 1774, and took his BA degree in 1776. He was elected a junior fellow in 1777, proceeded M.A. 1779, and was called to the bar of Ireland. He graduated LL.B. (1780) and LL.D. (1784), and in 1784 became an advocate in the courts of delegates, prerogative, admiralty, and consistory, and for a long time held the vicar-generalship of the Diocese of Kildare. He served as junior proctor of the university in 1784, and as senior proctor—having become a senior fellow in 1795—from 1807 to the time of his death.

In 1783 he was returned to the Irish House of Commons as MP for Dublin University, which he continued to represent in three parliaments until 1800. He was considered one of the best debaters in the Commons. He was a moderate reformer, supporting some measures of parliamentary reform, and also the gradual introduction of Catholic emancipation. He was opposed both to the Irish Rebellion of 1798 and to the extreme measures to suppress it. He lost his seat in parliament largely due to his change of heart on the Act of Union 1800, which he initially opposed but later supported, on the ground that the Parliament of Ireland no longer commanded the respect or loyalty of the Irish people. The defection of such a respected figure from the anti-Union side was a major blow to the cause, and some of his former friends never forgave him.

In 1785 Browne became Regius professor of Civil and Canon Laws at the University of Dublin, and afterwards published A Compendious View of the Civil Law (1798), and ‘A Compendious View of the Ecclesiastical Law, being the Substance of a Course of Lectures read in the University of Dublin,’ &c., 8vo, Dublin, 1799, &c. A second edition, ‘with great additions,’ was published as ‘A Compendious View of the Ecclesiastical Law of Ireland,' &c., 8vo, Dublin, 1803; and a ‘first American edition from the second London edition, with great additions,' was published as ‘A Compendious View of the Civil Law, and of the Law of the Admiralty,' &c., 2 vols. 8vo, New York, 1840. In addition to his chair of law, Browne thrice held the Regius Professorship of Greek at Dublin (from 1792 to 1795, from 1797 to 1799, and from 1801 to 1805). He was both a popular and a conscientious lecturer.

Browne was made King's Counsel in 1795, became Prime Serjeant in 1802, and in 1803 was admitted a bencher of the Society of the Kings Inns, Dublin. Browne was the last to hold the office of Prime Serjeant. He was also made a member of the Privy Council of Ireland. He died on Saturday morning, 8 June 1805, in Clare Street, Dublin. He was twice married, and had by his first wife Marianne a daughter, and a family by his second wife Bridget, who, with five children, survived him.

When a college corps of yeomanry was formed on the appearance of the French in Bantry Bay in December 1796, Browne was unanimously elected to the command. In 1787 he defended the Church of Ireland in spite of much abuse and was a conscientious supporter of the Union. Browne published, in imitation of Montaigne, two volumes of ‘Miscellaneous Sketches, or Hints for Essays,' 8vo, London, 1798, the first of which was inscribed ‘to his daughter, M. T. B.,’ the second ‘to the memory of Marianne,’ his first wife. Browne also published, as a study in fancy and philology, ‘Hussen O Dil. Beauty and the Heart, an Allegory; translated from the Persian Language,’ &c., 4to, Dublin, 1801, and he was also the author of ‘A Brief Review of the Question, Whether the Articles of Limerick have been violated?' 8vo, Dublin, 1788, a defence of the legislature against the calumnies with which it had been assailed during the session preceding its publication.

== Notes ==
Parliament of Ireland
Preceded by Lawrence Parsons; John FitzGibbon	Member of Parliament for Dublin University; 1783–1800; With: Lawrence Parsons to 1790; Hon. Francis Hely-Hutchinson 1790–1798; Hon. George Knox 1798–1800	Parliament of Ireland abolished see Dublin University Westminster constituency
