= Lambeth Walk =

Road in Lambeth, London

Coordinates: 51.49387°N 0.11436°W

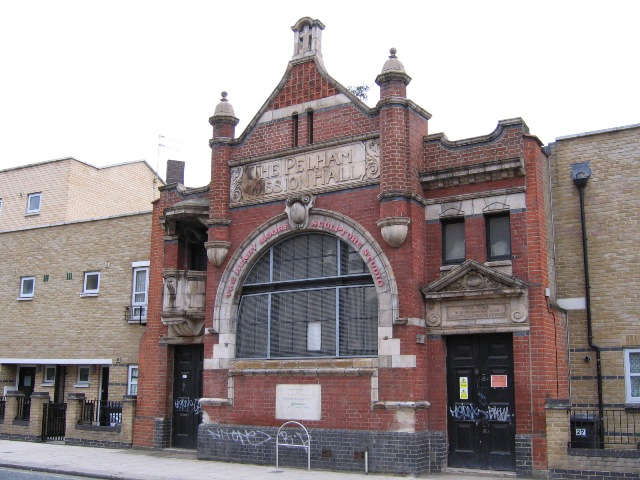
Formerly Pelham Hall

Lambeth Walk is a street in Lambeth, London, England, off Lambeth Road. It was at the heart of a working class residential area and there was a street market.

The area was originally developed with wells and a recreation ground. Houses followed in the 19th century.

After some bomb damage during the Blitz in World War II on 18 September 1940, the area became rather run-down and was subsequently rebuilt. Some older buildings survive, including the Henry Moore Sculpture Studios, image adjacent.

== Notable buildings ==
Lambeth Walk starts as a turning off the Lambeth Road (A3203) between Kennington Road and the main railway line into London Waterloo station. On the junction with Lambeth Road is the former Lambeth Walk pub. On the opposite corner is the modern hall of the Lambeth Mission church (now shared with St Mary's church) and International House, now a hall of residence of the University of Westminster.

Turning into Lambeth Walk, at no 5 is the Lambeth Walk Group Practice, a local NHS health centre run for many years by King's College London. The practice relocated to the site in 1996; the building was converted from a former public laundry and slipper baths.

The Chandler Community Hall at 15 Lambeth Walk serves the adjacent China Walk estate, a London County Council estate where the houses are named after different china manufacturers, including Wedgwood, Derby and Doulton. A plaque on the Hall commemorates Charlie Chaplin whose early years were spent nearby.

Next to the Chandler Community Hall is the Pelham Hall, now the sculpture department of Morley College. This was the original Lambeth Mission hall, built in about 1910, with a distinctive outside pulpit.

Nos 73-75 Lambeth Walk were historically in the ownership of St Olave's Church, Southwark. OneFam Waterloo Hostel is now at 73 Lambeth Walk.

Continuing southeast of Fitzalan Street and Juxon Street, Lambeth Walk is flanked by modern social housing, built partly on the site of the former Norfolk House, home of the Duke of Norfolk, on Old Paradise Street. Fitzalan Street, off Lambeth Walk, takes its name from the Norfolk ducal family, while Juxon Street is named after Archbishop William Juxon, former resident of Lambeth Palace.

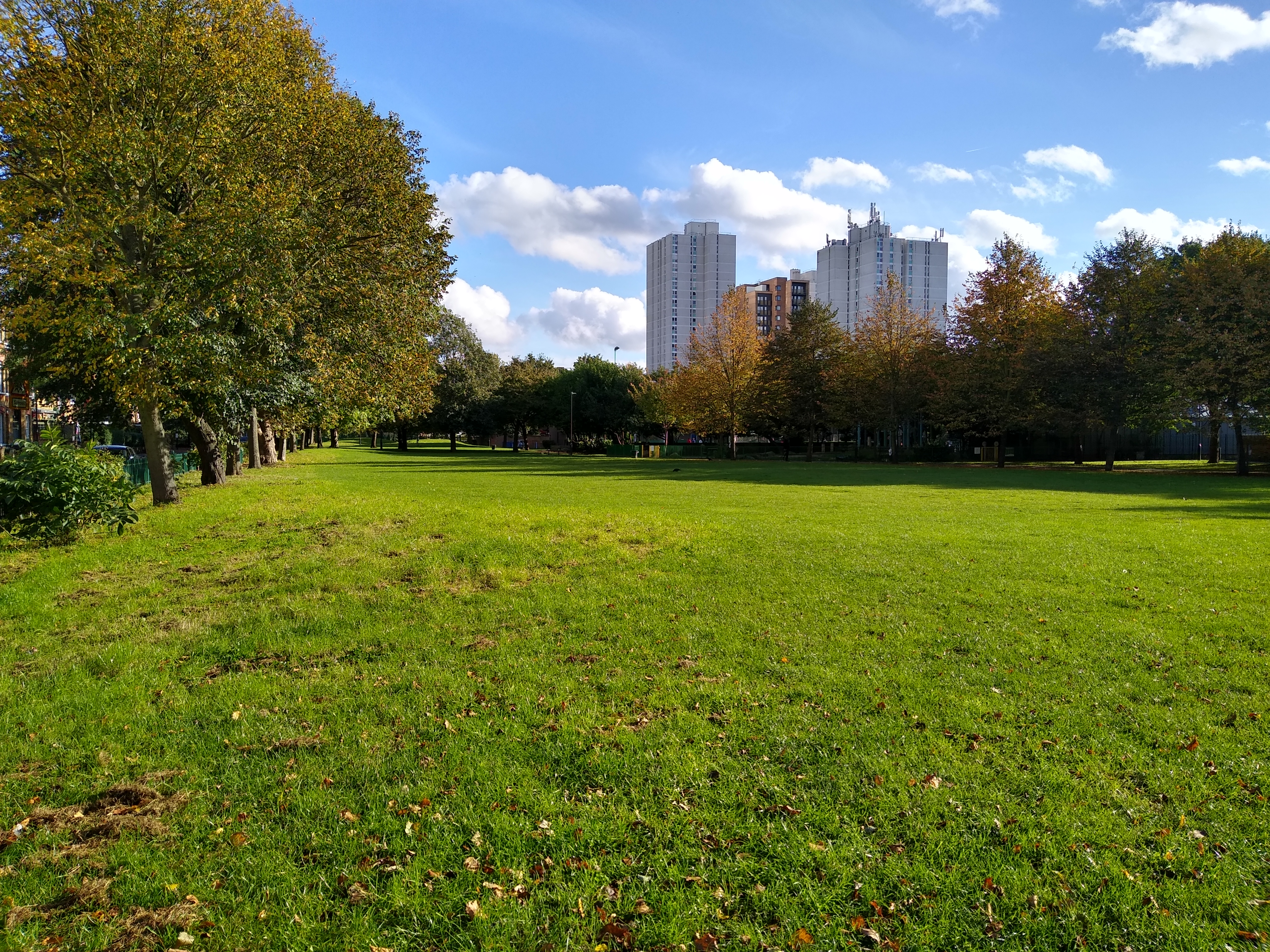
Lambeth Walk Doorstep Green

Lambeth Walk Doorstep Green, a small park, is between Fitzalan and Lollard Streets. The former boiler house at Sugden House on the corner of Old Paradise Street was redeveloped for housing; the chimney was preserved as a local landmark.

Lambeth Walk ends at Black Prince Road, opposite the Jolly Gardeners pub.

== Popular culture ==
The area gave its name to a popular song, "The Lambeth Walk", from the musical Me and My Girl (1937), and a film based on the show released in 1939, with the refrain:

Anytime you're Lambeth way
Any evening, any day,
You'll find us all doin' the Lambeth walk.

It was also mentioned in the song "This Is What We Find" (1979) by Ian Dury and the Blockheads:

Forty-year old housewife Mrs Elizabeth Walk of Lambeth Walk
Had a husband who was jubblified with only half a stalk
So she had a Milk of Magnesia and curry powder sandwich,
Half a pound of uncut pork
Took an overdose of Omo, this made the neighbours talk
