= Taghmon (Parliament of Ireland constituency) =

Pre-1801 Irish constituency

- Former borough constituency for the Irish House of Commons
- County: County Wexford
- Borough: Taghmon

–1801
- Replaced by: Disfranchised

Taghmon, in County Wexford, Ireland, was a constituency represented in the Irish House of Commons until its abolition on 1 January 1801.

== Members of Parliament ==
- 1634–1635 David Hore of Harperstown and Thomas Roche
- 1639–1649: Richard Barnewall (expelled for non-attendance)
- 1661–1666 John Cliffe and Sir Anthony Morgan

=== 1689–1801 ===
Election	First MP	Second MP
1689	George Hore	Walter Hore
1692	Patrick Lambert	Anderson Saunders
1695	Robert Wolseley	Anderson Saunders
1703	Richard Saunders	Anderson Saunders
1713	George Saville	Anderson Saunders
1715	Richard Saunders	Anderson Saunders
1719	Richard Saunders	Caesar Colclough
1727	Richard Saunders	William Hore
1731	John Bowes	William Hore
1742	Charles Gardiner	William Hore
1746	Charles Gardiner	Walter Hore
1761	Walter Hore	Hon. James Stopford
1768	John Hatch	James Willson
1771	Sir James Cotter, 2nd Bt	James Willson
1776	Thomas Pigott	William Alexander English
1783	Dudley Hussey	Hon. Richard Hely-Hutchinson
1786	Robert Stubber	Hon. Richard Hely-Hutchinson
1789	Robert Stubber	Hon. John Hely-Hutchinson
1790	John Hely-Hutchinson	Warden Flood
1795	Hon. Christopher Hely-Hutchinson	Warden Flood
1796	Charles McDonnell	Warden Flood
1797	Charles McDonnell	Robert Rutledge
1798	William Knott	James Knox
1801	Constituency disenfranchised	
