= Francis Hely-Hutchinson =

Irish politician (1759–1827)

Francis Hely-Hutchinson (26 October 1759 – 16 December 1827), styled The Honourable from 1783, was an Irish politician.

== Biography ==
He was the son of Christiana Nickson, 1st Baroness of Donoughmore of Knocklofty and The Rt Hon. John Hely-Hutchinson. He served as Member of Parliament in the Irish House of Commons for Dublin University from 1790 to 1798 and then for Naas from 1798 until the Act of Union in 1801.

He married Frances Nixon and had nine children. Their daughter, Louisa Frances Hely-Hutchinson married Francis Synge-Hutchinson and their son was Lt-Gen Coote Synge-Hutchinson. His son John succeeded to the peerages created for both his mother and brother.

From 1800 to 1827 he served as Collector of Customs at Dublin Port succeeding Theophilus Jones.

Parliament of Ireland
Preceded by Laurence Parsons; Arthur Browne	Member of Parliament for Dublin University; 1790–1798; With: Arthur Browne	Succeeded by Hon. George Knox; Arthur Browne
Preceded by Sir James Bond, 1st Bt; George Damer, Viscount Milton	Member of Parliament for Naas; 1798–1801; With: Hon. Thomas Pelham 1798; John Macartney 1798–1801	Succeeded by Parliament of the United Kingdom
