= Phyllis Broughton =

Dancer and actress (1862–1926)

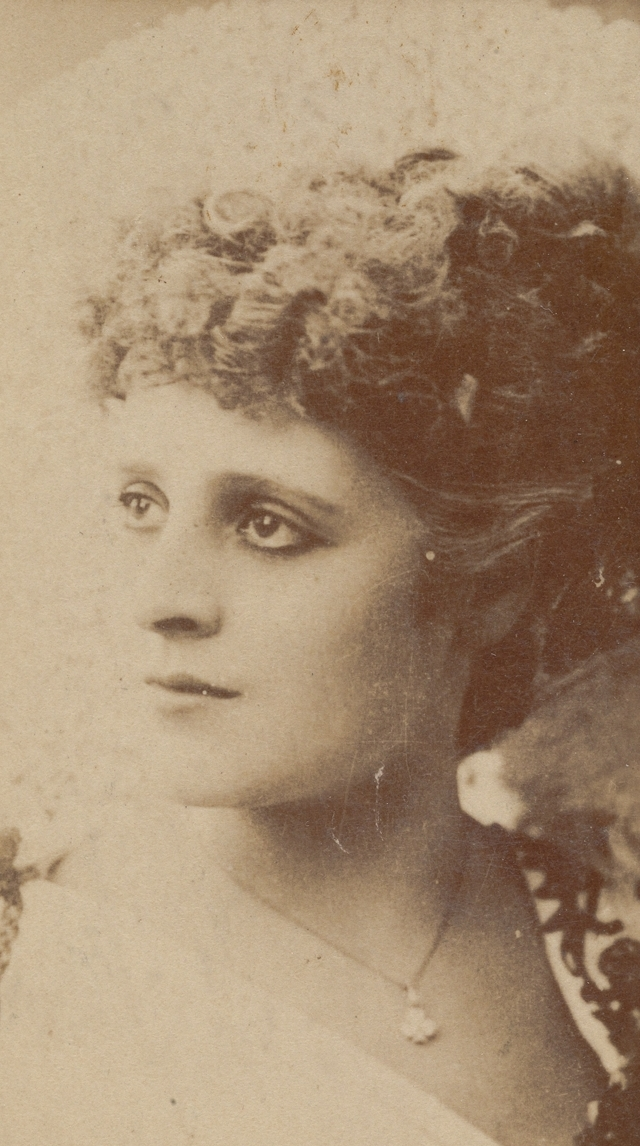
- from a cigarette card
- Born: Phyllis Harriet Wright; 1862; Lambeth
- Died: 21 July 1926 (aged 63–64); Marylebone
- Occupations: dancer and actor
- Employer: Gaiety Theatre

Phyllis Broughton born Phyllis Harriet Wright became Phyllis Harriet Thomson (1862 – 21 July 1926) was a British dancer and actress who was known as a Gaiety Girl. She was awarded £2,500 in a breach of promise case and she then left another at the altar and he devoted the rest of his life to her.

== Life ==
Broughton was born in 90 Hercules Buildings on Hercules Road in Lambeth. Her parents were Emily Charlotte, (born Jecks) and William Wright and she was the first of their four children. Her career was an unusual choice for a girl from a good family. Her father was a clerk to an architect in the 1870s and she was training to dance at the Neville Dramatic School and studying ballet. She adopted the name Phyllis Broughton when she made her debut at the Canterbury Music Hall in London in March 1877.

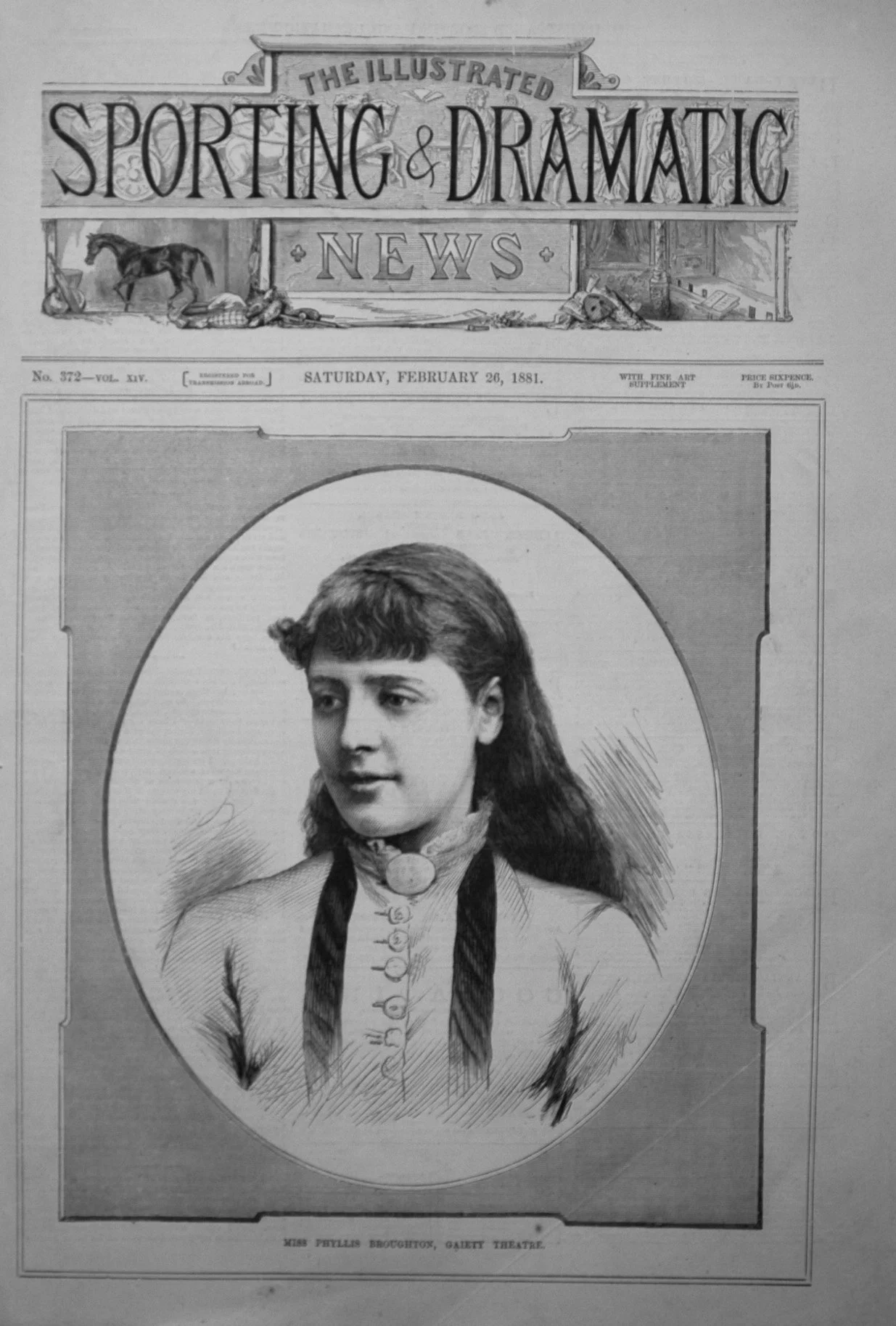
Phyllis Broughton cover girl in 1881 on the Illustrated Sporting and Dramatic News

The manager of the Gaiety Theatre, John Hollingshead, employed her as part of his company in 1880. The theatre was known for its chorus of girls, daring ad-libs (that avoided censorship) and the costumes that the girls wore. The Gaiety had a quartet of leading actors Nellie Farren, Kate Vaughan, Edward O'Connor Terry, and E. W. Royce. Kate Vaughan made her last appearance at the Gaiety in 1883, before she married, and soon gave up dancing. This allowed Broughton to take over her roles. In 1884 she was promoted from the chorus to play roles in the theatre's adaptions of stories from One Thousand and One Nights. She gathered her own following, and her own skirts, for her version of the skirt-dance as she appeared in Whittington and His Cat, Aladdin, Little Robin Hood, Blue Beard (1883), and Camaralzaman in 1884. Camaralzaman was judged to be uninspiring but Broughton was the actor singled out for her performance. She became a "Gaiety Girl" who made a fortune from her success. Her name was associated with that term after she played Lady Virginia in A Gaiety Girl in 1893.

Her father died in 1883 and her mother gave birth to another child name Haidee. Her mother would later marry Haidee's father in 1888 and General Coote Synge-Hutchinson became her step father. He brought the police to her aid when she began to receive threats amongst her fan mail.

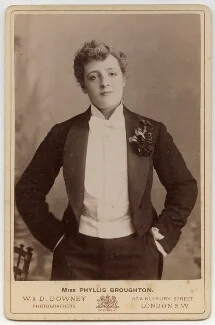
Phyllis Broughton as Lord Clanside in In Town

In 1888 she sued Viscount Dangan for breach of promise. He had asked her to marry him and then he changed his mind. His lawyers agreed damages of £2,500 and they made assurances that the break up was not a reflection on her character. Viscount Dangan went on to marry another in 1889.

Broughon herself broke off her own engagement in 1889 to John Thomas Hedley who had prepared a home, Longcroft, for her to live. Hedley owned property and he became a recluse with his unrequited love. It was said that he employed over a dozen gardners to keep that house in good order. Hedley is said to have sent gifts every week to Broughton until she died and even after that he was devoted to her.

She married in 1917 to a doctor from Margate and she did not appear again on stage. She had been living in Margate for twenty years after she bought "the best house in Margate", India House. The house had been bought by her step father on her behalf and he owned it for just a month.

== Death and legacy ==
Broughton died a widow in Marylebone following an operation in 1926. One of the two executors was John Thomas Hedley. She left £230,000 in her will and her jewellery was auctioned in the following year and it sold for £36,000. Her will established the Robert Thomson And Phyllis Broughton Scholarship Fund which became a charity in 1965. India House was owned by a firm of solicitors in 2017. John Hedley continued as her admirer until he died in 1936 near Lake Windermere. He left £655,129 and Broughton was to receive any unallocated monies.
