= Édouard Drouyn de Lhuys =

French diplomat (1805–1881)

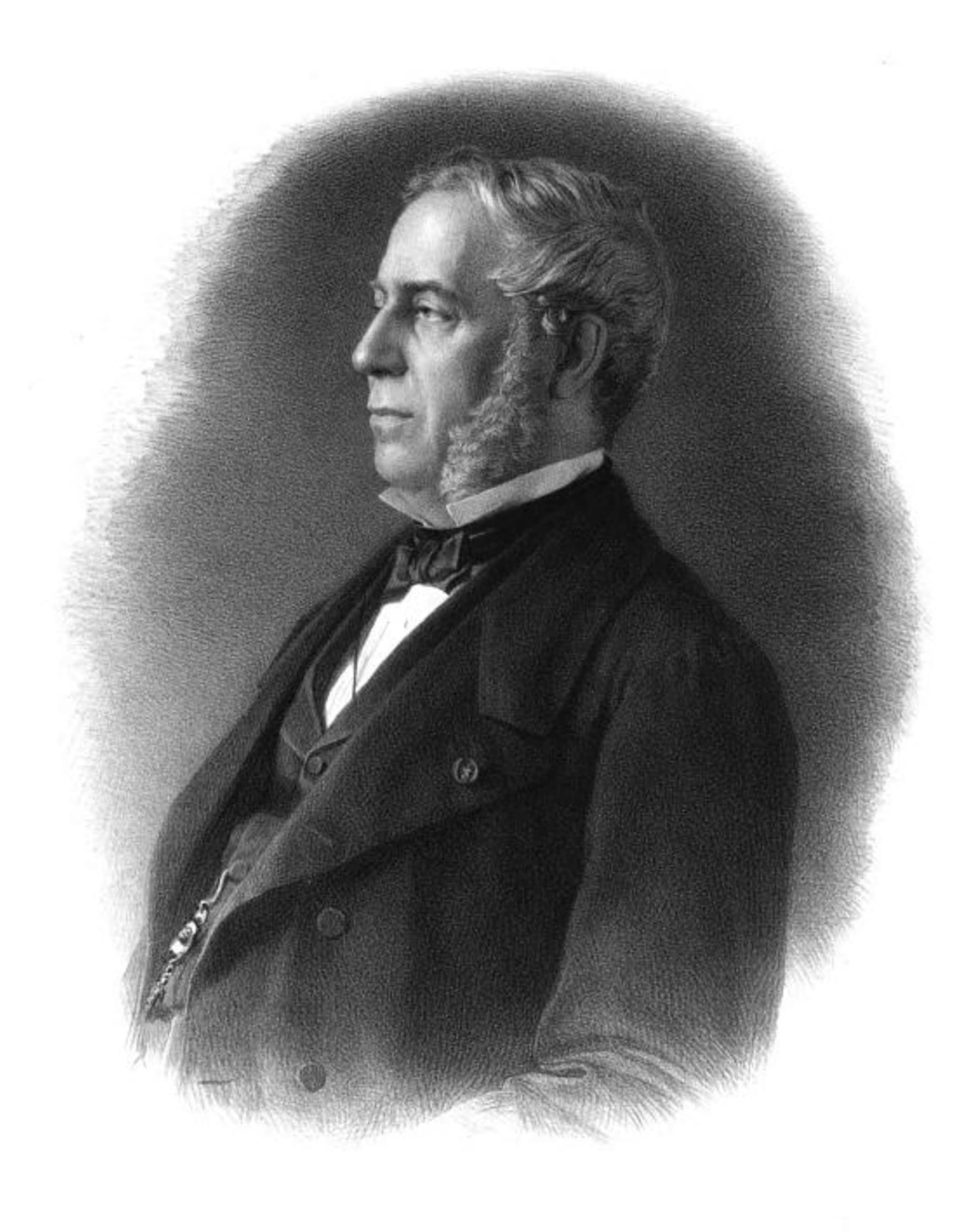
Edouard Drouyn de Lhuys (1805-1881), by Auguste Lemoine.

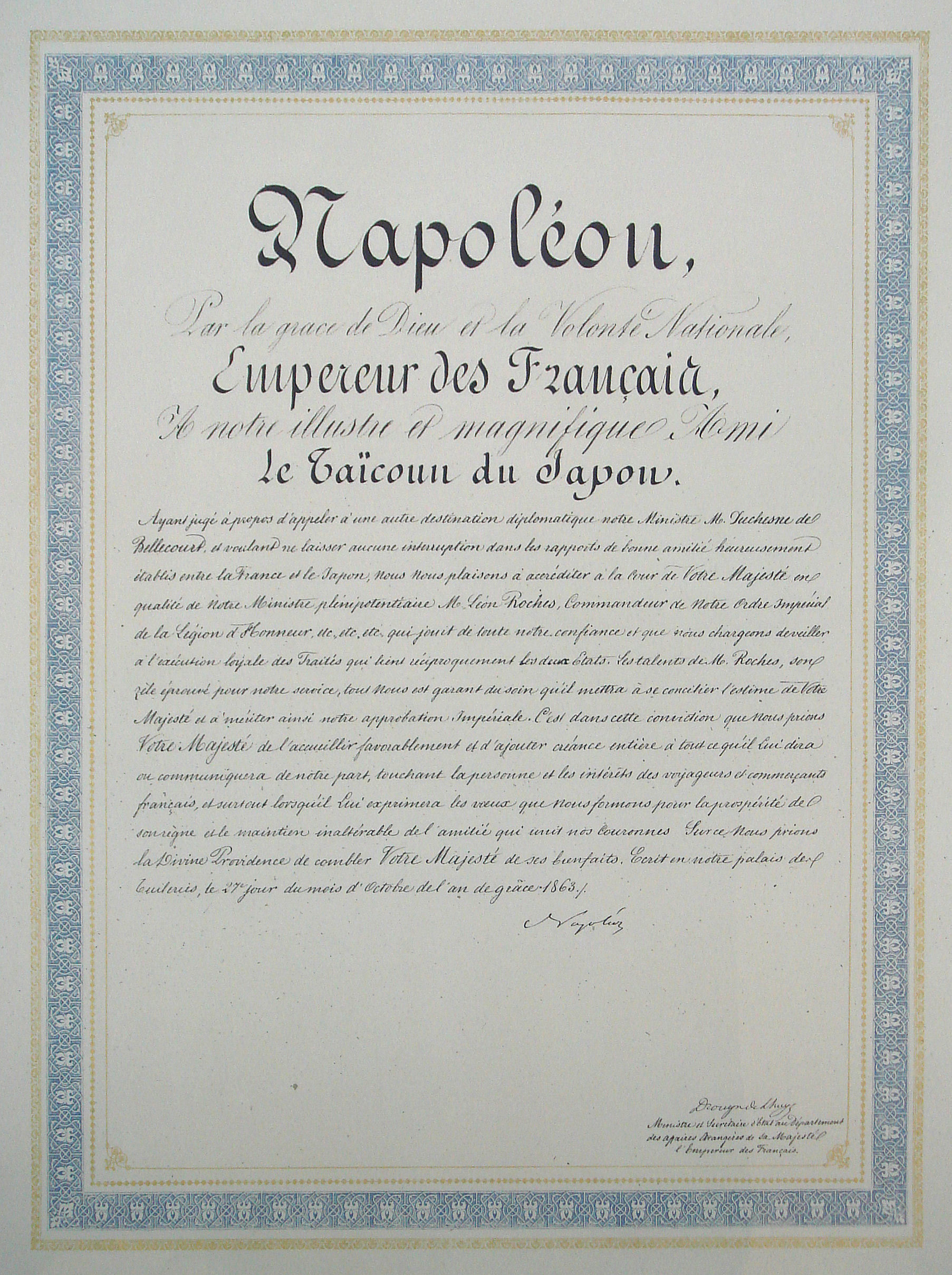
Letter of Napoleon III to the Japanese Shogun nominating Léon Roches, in replacement of Duchesne de Bellecourt, countersigned by Drouyn de Lhuys. Diplomatic Record Office of the Ministry of Foreign Affairs (Japan).

Édouard Drouyn de Lhuys (pronounced [edwaːʁ dʁuɛ̃ də‿lɥis]; 19 November 1805 – 1 March 1881) was a French diplomat. Born in Paris, he was educated at the Lycée Louis-le-Grand. The scion of a wealthy and noble house, he excelled in rhetoric. He quickly became interested in politics and diplomacy.

== Biography ==
He was ambassador to the Netherlands and Spain, and distinguished himself by his opposition to Guizot. Drouyn de Lhuys served as Minister of Foreign Affairs from 1848 to 1849 in the first government of Odilon Barrot. In Barrot's second government, he was replaced by Alexis de Tocqueville, and was appointed ambassador to Great Britain. He returned briefly as foreign minister for a few days in January 1851, and then returned permanently in the summer of 1852, becoming the first foreign minister of the Second Empire. He resigned his post in 1855, during the Crimean War, when the peace preliminaries he had agreed to in consultation with the British and Austrians at Vienna were rejected by Napoleon III.

Drouyn de Lhuys returned to power 7 years later, in 1862, when foreign minister Édouard Thouvenel resigned over differences with Napoleon on Italian affairs. Drouyn was thus foreign minister in the lead-up to the Austro-Prussian War. He commented that, "the Emperor has immense desires and limited abilities. He wants to do extraordinary things but is only capable of extravagances." In the aftermath of that war, which was disastrous to French interests in Europe, Drouyn resigned and withdrew into private life.

== Honours ==
- Two Sicilies: Knight of the Illustrious Royal Order of Saint Januarius, 1852
- Grand Duchy of Hesse: Grand Cross of the Grand Ducal Hessian Order of Ludwig, 11 February 1853
- Spain: Grand Cross of the Royal and Distinguished Order of Charles III, 27 January 1854
- Belgium: Grand Cordon of the Order of Leopold (civil division), 23 July 1854
- Grand Duchy of Tuscany: Grand Cross of the Order of Saint Joseph
- Austria: Grand Cross of the Royal Hungarian Order of Saint Stephen, 1855
- Mexican Empire: Grand Cross of the Imperial Order of Guadalupe, 1864
- Sweden-Norway: Knight of the Royal Order of the Seraphim, 27 March 1865
- Monaco: Grand Cross of the Order of Saint-Charles, 24 December 1865

== See also ==
- Internationalization of the Danube River

Political offices
Preceded by Jules Bastide	Minister of Foreign Affairs; 1848–1849	Succeeded by Alexis de Tocqueville
Preceded by Vicomte de La Hitte	Minister of Foreign Affairs; 1851	Succeeded by Baron Brénier
Preceded by Marquis de Turgot	Minister of Foreign Affairs; 1852–1855	Succeeded by Comte Walewski
Preceded by Édouard Thouvenel	Minister of Foreign Affairs; 1862–1866	Succeeded by Marquis de La Valette
