= Earl of Donoughmore =

Title in the peerage of Ireland

Earldom of Donoughmore
- Arms: Quarterly: 1st & 4th, Per pale Gules and Azure, a Lion rampant, between eight Crosses-Crosslet Argent (Hutchinson); 2nd, Azure, a Fess between three Stag’s Heads erased in chief Argent, and in base a Demi-Lion Or (Hely); 3rd, Azure, a Garb Or, between three Wolves’ Heads erased Argent (Nixon). Crest: Out of a Ducal Coronet Or, a Demi-Cockatrice wings elevated Azure. Supporters: On either side a Cockatrice wings elevated Or, collared Sable, combs and wattles Gules, and charged on the breast with a Wreath of Laurel Vert.
- Creation date: 29 December 1800
- Created by: George III
- Peerage: Peerage of Ireland
- First holder: Richard Heley-Hutchinson, 1st Viscount Donoughmore
- Present holder: John Hely-Hutchinson, 9th Earl of Donoughmore
- Heir apparent: Richard Hely-Hutchinson, Viscount Suirdale
- Subsidiary titles: Viscount Donoughmore; Viscount Hutchinson; Baron Donoughmore
- Status: Extant
- Seats: The Manor House, near Bampton
- Former seat: Knocklofty House
- Motto: FORTITER GERIT CRUCEM (He bravely bears the Cross)

Earl of Donoughmore is a title in the Peerage of Ireland. It is associated with the Hely-Hutchinson family. Paternally of Gaelic Irish descent with the original name of Ó hÉalaighthe, their ancestors had long lived in the County Cork area as allies of the Mac Cárthaigh clan; they lost out during the times of Oliver Cromwell. One branch of the family converted to the Anglican Church and after inheriting territories through his mother and adding "Hutchinson" to Hely, became the Earl of Donoughmore.

== History ==
The title Earl of Donoughmore was created in 1800 for Richard Hely-Hutchinson, 1st Viscount Donoughmore, with remainder to the heirs male of his mother. He was a general in the British Army and sat in the House of Lords as one of the 28 original Irish representative peers from 1800 to 1825. Hely-Hutchinson had already been created Viscount Donoughmore, of Knocklofty in the County of Tipperary, in the Peerage of Ireland in 1797, and was made Viscount Hutchinson, of Knocklofty in the County of Tipperary, in the Peerage of the United Kingdom, in 1821. These titles were also created with remainder to the heirs male of his mother. Lord Donoughmore was the eldest son of the Irish statesman and lawyer John Hely-Hutchinson, who married Christiana, daughter of Abraham Nixon (or Nickson) and niece and heiress of Richard Hutchinson of Knocklofty in County Tipperary, whose surname she and her husband adopted. In 1783, Christiana was raised to the Peerage of Ireland in honour of her husband as Baroness Donoughmore, of Knocklofty in the County of Tipperary.

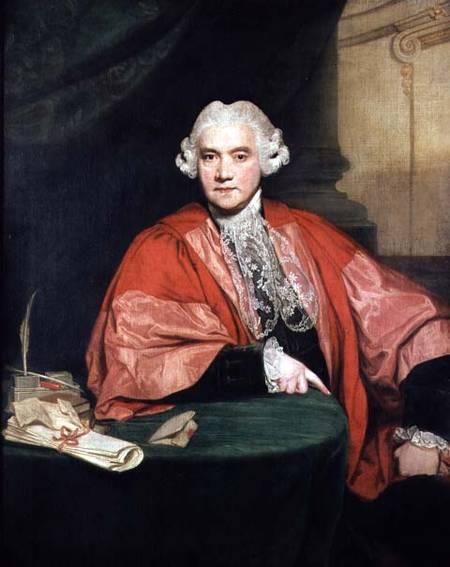
John Hely-Hutchinson (1724–1794) by Sir Joshua Reynolds (1723–1792)

The first Earl was succeeded according to the special remainder (and normally in the barony of Donoughmore) by his younger brother, the second Earl. He was also a general in the British Army. In 1801 he was created Baron Hutchinson, of Alexandria and Knocklofty in the County of Tipperary, in the Peerage of the United Kingdom, with remainder to the heirs male of his body. Lord Donoughmore also served as Lord-Lieutenant of County Tipperary from 1831 to 1832.

On his death in 1832, the barony of 1801 became extinct while he was succeeded in the other titles by his nephew, the third Earl. He was the son of the Honourable Francis Hely-Hutchinson, third son of the first Baroness Donoughmore and John Hely-Hutchinson. He briefly represented County Tipperary in the House of Commons and served as Lord-Lieutenant of County Tipperary. He was succeeded by his son, the fourth Earl. He was a Conservative politician and served in the Earl of Derby's second administration as Paymaster General and President of the Board of Trade. His grandson, the fifth Earl, was also a Conservative politician and held office as Under-Secretary of State for War from 1903 to 1904 under Arthur Balfour. He was succeeded by his son, the sixth Earl, a noted Irish Freemason. His son, the seventh Earl, sat as Conservative Member of Parliament for Peterborough from 1943 to 1945. As of 2025 the titles are held by the latter's grandson, the ninth Earl, who succeeded in 2025.

Another member of the Hely-Hutchinson family was the Honourable Christopher Hely-Hutchinson (1767–1826), fifth son of Baroness Donoughmore and John Hely-Hutchison. He represented Cork City in the House of Commons. The Honourable Sir Walter Hely-Hutchinson, younger son of the fourth Earl, was the last Governor of the Cape Colony. The Honourable Tim Hely Hutchinson, second son of the eighth Earl, is a publisher.

The family seat now is The Manor House, near Bampton, Oxfordshire. The former family seat was Knocklofty House, near Clonmel, County Tipperary, in Ireland. The Knocklofty Estate was sold by the family in the 1970s.

The heir apparent to the earldom uses the invented courtesy title Viscount Suirdale (pronounced "Shure-dale"). This derives from the fact that the territorial designation of the Irish viscountcy of Donoughmore was erroneously thought to be "of Suirdale".

== Barons Donoughmore (1783) ==
- Christiana Hely-Hutchinson, 1st Baroness Donoughmore (1732–1788)
- Richard Hely-Hutchinson, 2nd Baron Donoughmore (1756–1825) (created Earl of Donoughmore in 1800)

== Earls of Donoughmore (1800) ==
- Richard Hely-Hutchinson, 1st Earl of Donoughmore (1756–1825)
- John Hely-Hutchinson, 2nd Earl of Donoughmore (1757–1832)
- John Hely-Hutchinson, 3rd Earl of Donoughmore (1787–1851)
- Richard John Hely-Hutchinson, 4th Earl of Donoughmore (1823–1866)
- John Luke George Hely-Hutchinson, 5th Earl of Donoughmore (1848–1900)
- Richard Walter Hely-Hutchinson, 6th Earl of Donoughmore (1875–1948)
- John Michael Henry Hely-Hutchinson, 7th Earl of Donoughmore (1902–1981)
- Richard Michael John Hely-Hutchinson, 8th Earl of Donoughmore (1927–2025)
- John Michael James Hely-Hutchinson, 9th Earl of Donoughmore (born 1952)

The heir apparent is the present holder's son Hon. Richard Gregory Hely-Hutchinson, Viscount Suirdale (born 1980), who was educated at Lycée Français Charles de Gaulle and St Hugh's College, Oxford.
