= Edward Douglas Brown =

Recipient of the Victoria Cross

Edward Douglas Brown-Synge-Hutchinson VC CB
- Born: Edward Douglas Brown; 6 March 1861; Dagshai, British India
- Died: 3 March 1940 (aged 78); Marble Arch, London
- Burial place: Golders Green Crematorium
- Relatives: Lieutenant-General Coote Synge-Hutchinson (uncle)
- Military career
- Allegiance: United Kingdom
- Branch: British Army
- Service years: 1883–1915
- Rank: Colonel
- Commands: 14th Hussars
- Conflicts: Second Boer War
- Awards: Victoria Cross; Order of the Bath
- Other work: Freeman of the City of London

Colonel Edward Douglas Brown-Synge-Hutchinson, VC, CB (6 March 1861 – 3 March 1940) was an Anglo-Irish soldier and a recipient of the Victoria Cross, the highest and most prestigious award for gallantry in the face of the enemy that can be awarded to British and Commonwealth forces.

== Biography ==
He was born as Edward Douglas Brown in Kasauli, Dagshai, India, the son of Frances Dorothy Synge-Hutchinson and David Philip Brown of the 7th Queen's Own Hussars. Thus he was the nephew of both Sir Edward Synge-Hutchinson and Lieutenant General Coote Synge-Hutchinson.

Brown was educated at Edinburgh Academy and the United Services College. He entered the Army as a Lieutenant in the 18th Hussars on 7 November 1883. On 27 March 1889, he joined the 14th King's Hussars. From 1 January 1890 to 31 December 1894, he was Commandant of the Aldershot School of Instruction for Yeomanry.

Brown had achieved the rank of major when the 14th King's Hussars were mobilised for active service on 9 October 1899 for service in the Second Boer War. They had been stationed at Newbridge in Ireland, and arrived in South Africa in January 1900. As a result of his courage under fire, he was awarded the Victoria Cross. He was also mentioned twice in dispatches: on 29 November 1900 by Lord Roberts, Commander-in-Chief during the early part of the war and on 8 April 1902 by Lord Kitchener C-i-C during the latter part of the war

Brown left Cape Town for the United Kingdom in early May 1902, shortly before the end of the war, part of a detachment to attend the Coronation of King Edward VII. He received a brevet promotion to lieutenant-colonel in the South African Honours list published on 26 June 1902.

In 1904 he took the name (but was not able to inherit the title) of his maternal uncle, Sir Edward Synge-Hutchinson, to become Edward Douglas Brown-Synge-Hutchinson VC.

In November 1906 he was promoted to the brevet rank of colonel, took command of the 14th Hussars in February 1907, and was simultaneously made a lieutenant colonel, and so served until February 1911.

After relinquishing command of the regiment he was promoted to colonel and placed on half-pay. In November that year he was made a Companion of the Order of the Bath (CB). He retired from the military in 1915.

Brown died in London at the age of 78.

== VC details ==
Brown was 39 years old, and a major in the 14th Hussars, British Army during the Second Boer War when the following deed took place on 13 October 1900 at Geluk, South Africa for which he was awarded the VC:

On the 13th October, 1900, at Geluk, when the enemy were within 400 yards, and bringing a heavy fire to bear, Major Brown, seeing that Sergeant Hersey's horse was shot, stopped behind the last squadron as it was retiring, and helped Sergeant Hersey to mount behind him, carrying him for about three-quarters of a mile to a place of safety. He did this under a heavy fire. Major Brown afterwards, enabled Lieutenant Browne, 14th Hussars, to mount, by holding his horse, which was very restive under the heavy fire. Lieutenant Browne could not otherwise have mounted. Subsequently Major Brown carried Lance-Corporal Trumpeter Leigh out of action.

=== The medal ===
His Victoria Cross is currently not on display, but is housed at HorsePower- The King's Royal Hussars Museum, Winchester, Hampshire, England.

== Arms ==
Coat of arms of Edward Douglas Brown
Notes Confirmed 21 April 1913 by Nevile Wilkinson, Ulster King of Arms. No crest or motto were recorded. Escutcheon Gules two demi-lions passant guardant Argent.
