= Nicholas Hely Hutchinson =

English painter

Nicholas Hely Hutchinson (born 1955) is a painter, based in Dorset. Initially influenced by Dufy and Matisse, he has also drawn on the English NeoRomantic tradition. He settled near Blandford, Dorset, and the countryside of that county and Wiltshire, horse racing, interiors and still life were among his subjects. He studied at Harrow School, Saint Martin's School of Art and Bristol Polytechnic. He is represented in the Government Art Collection. Hutchinson is the third son of the 8th Earl of Donoughmore, an old Irish family.
