= Hercules Road =

Street in Lambeth, London

Coordinates: 51°29′48″N 0°06′53″W

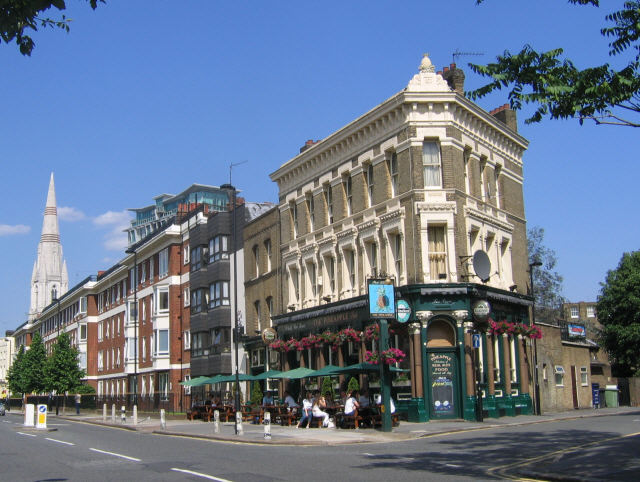
Pineapple public house and view north along Hercules Road.

Hercules Road runs north from Lambeth Road near Lambeth Palace, on the site of Penlington Place, in the London Borough of Lambeth, south London, England.

The road is named after Hercules Hall, which was built by and was the home of Philip Astley (1742–1814), riding instructor, horse-trainer, and acknowledged as the inventor of the modern circus. Performing nearby in an open field behind the present site of St John's Church, Waterloo, Astley realised the advantages of riding in a circle, and thus invented the circus ring. He was a principal among the many performers who made Lambeth a popular entertainment resort at that time.

Historically, Hercules Road is most well known for a former resident, the poet and visionary artist William Blake (1757–1827), who lived in a large house, 13 Hercules Buildings, and his address was Mr Blake Engraver, Hercules Buildings, Westminster Bridge. There is a series of mosaics inspired by Blake in a tunnel nearby. The site is marked with a plaque.

In 1860 the actress and dancer Phyllis Broughton was born at 90 Hercules Buildings. She became a Gaiety Girl who made a fortune from her success.

Hercules Road was a location for the film Passport to Pimlico. At the conclusion of filming, the site had to be returned to the same bomb-damaged state as before, to enable the locals to claim war damage compensation. It is also the setting for Tracy Chevalier's 2007 novel Burning Bright.

The Pineapple public house is located at 53–55 Hercules Road.

== Gallery ==
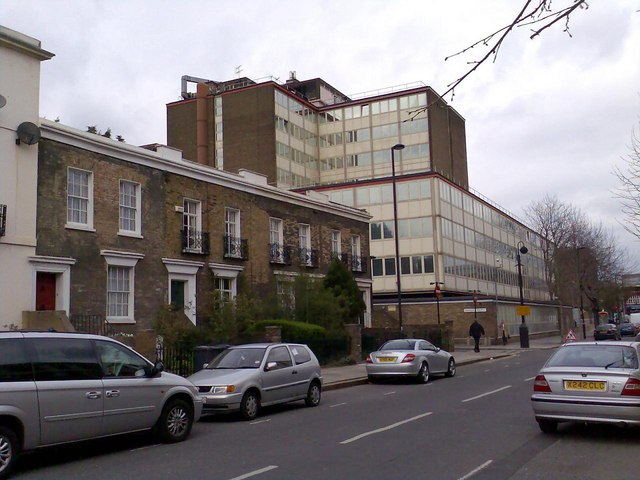
View on Hercules Road.

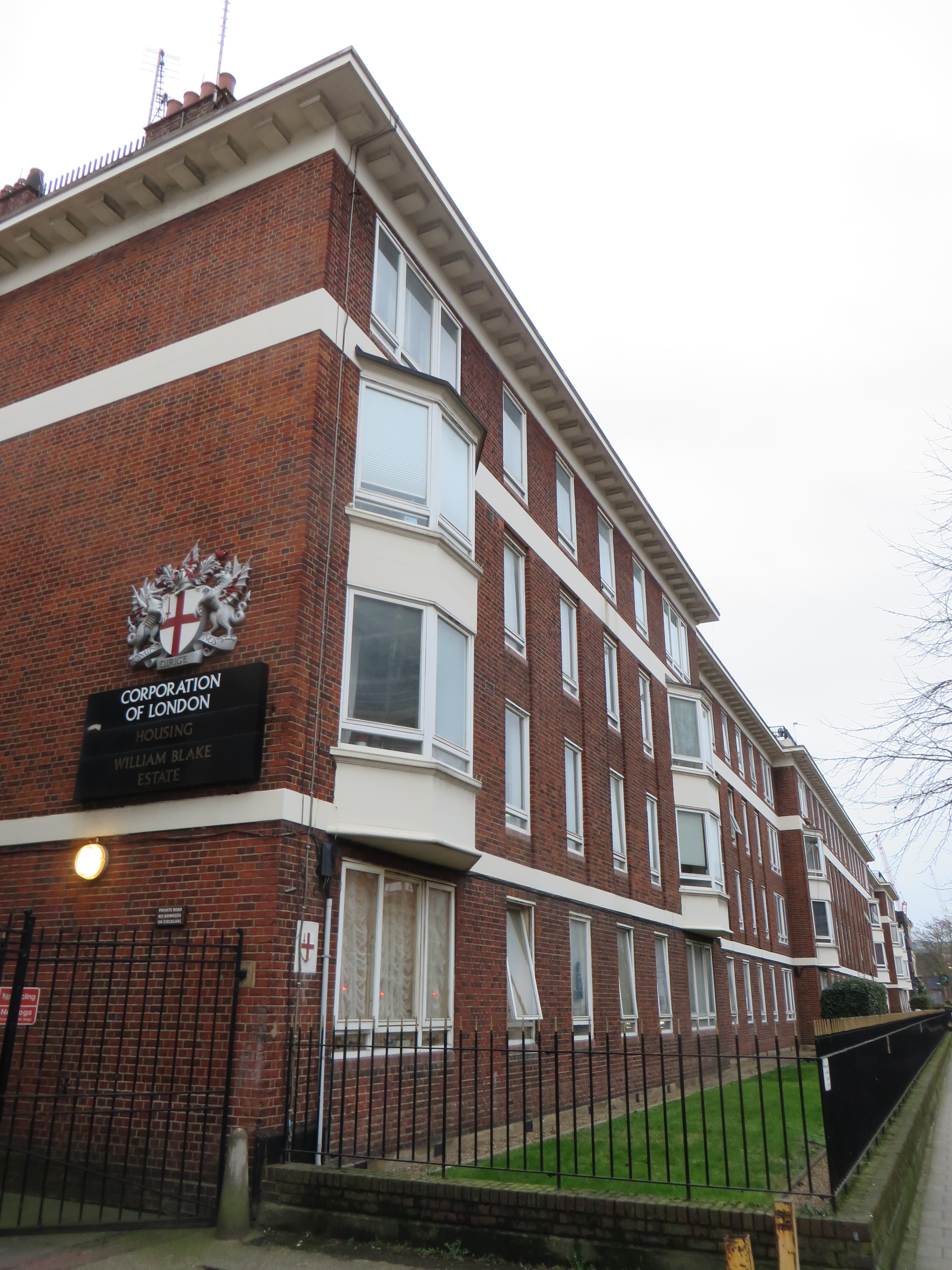
William Blake Estate building on Hercules Road.

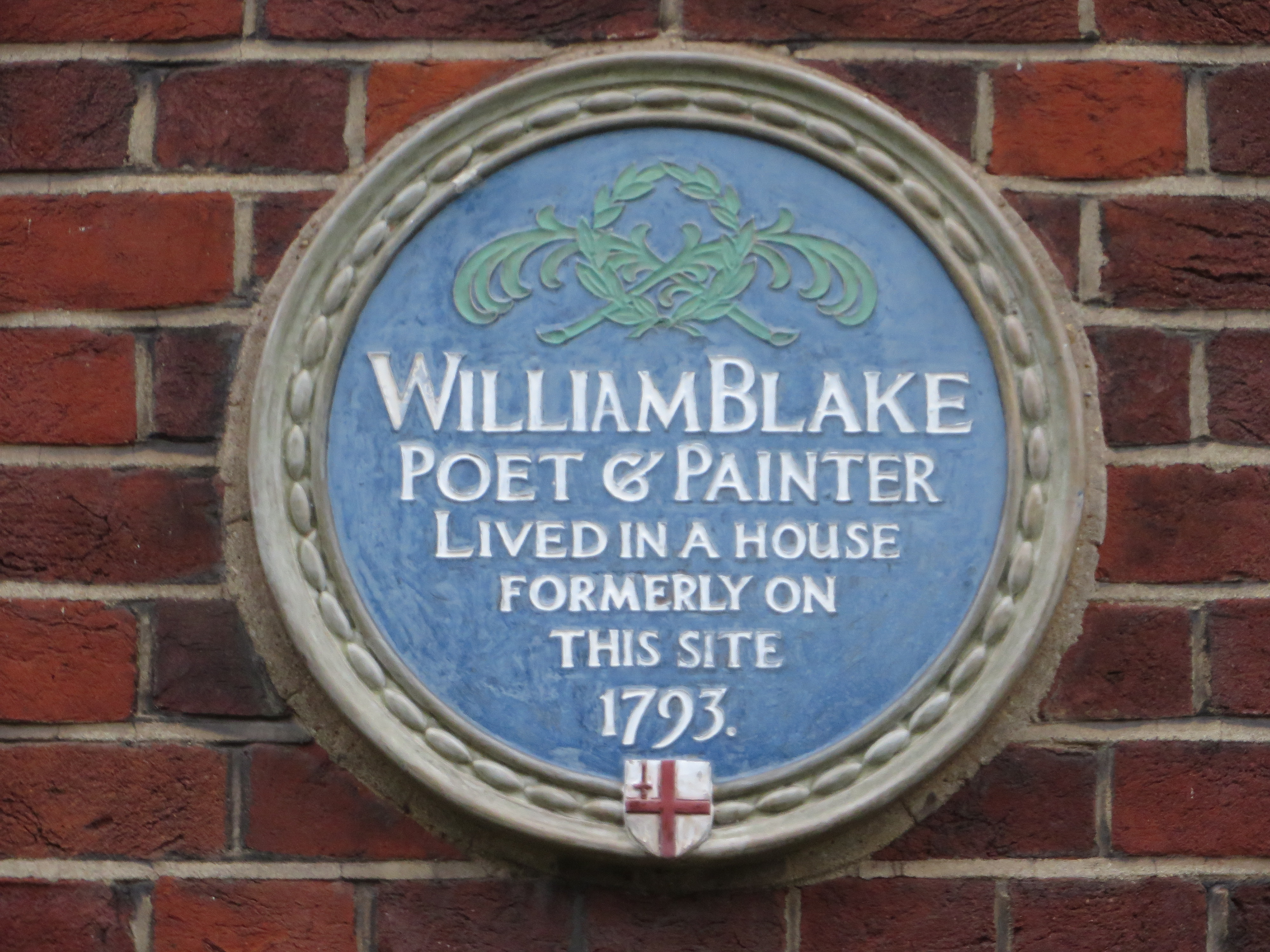
Plaque on William Blake Estate building in Hercules Road, marking the location of the artist and poet William Blake's former house.

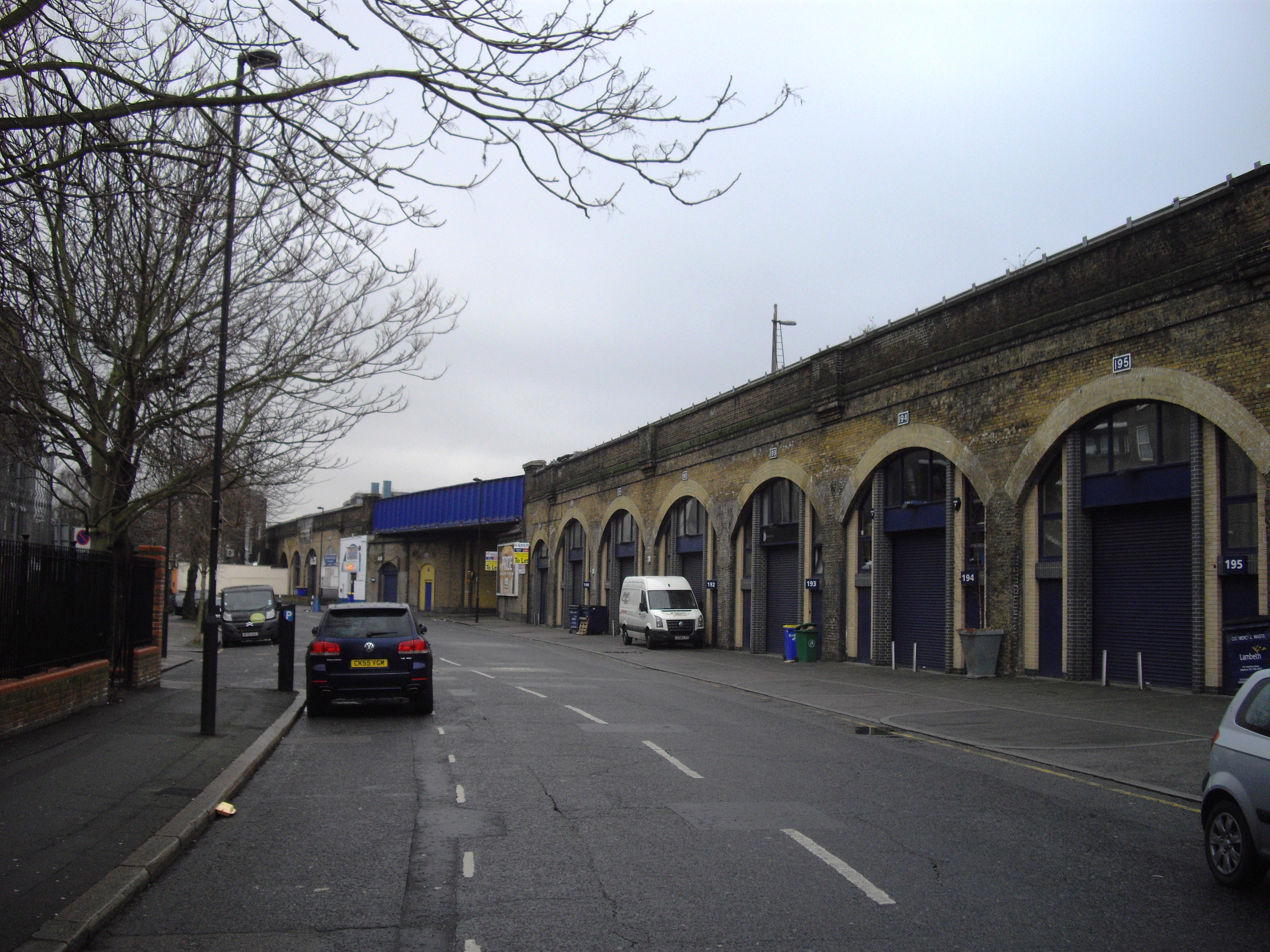
Railway arches on Hercules Road.
