= Dudley Hussey =

Irish politician and judge

Dudley Hussey (c. 1741-17 November 1785) was an Irish politician and judge. He sat in the Irish House of Commons for Taghmon and served briefly as Recorder of Dublin. His promising career was cut short by his early death, which was probably due to gaol fever.

He was born in Dublin, the eldest son of Miles Hussey of Abbey Street (died 1771), a teacher of mathematics. He entered the Middle Temple and was called to the Bar in 1766. He became MP for Taghmon in 1783. Taghmon was a rotten borough and he is said to have paid a considerable sum to secure his election. In 1784 he was elected Recorder of Dublin, beating three other candidates for the office (the Recorder was not a Crown appointment but was elected by Dublin Corporation). However, he died in November of the following year, reportedly from gaol fever caught while inspecting a prison.

He married in 1775 Susanna Darragh, only daughter of John Darragh, a wealthy merchant who sold glass and china at Lower Ormond Quay, Dublin: he was Lord Mayor of Dublin in 1781-2. His wife was Mary Newton, who died in 1799. John Darragh in 1782 built an impressive country house, Darraghville, at Kilcoole, County Wicklow, which still exists, though it has been extensively rebuilt. The estate was previously called Godden. Dudley and Susanna had no children, but his sister Mrs. Hughes named her son, Dudley Hussey Hughes, after her brother. Susanna died in 1787 and her estate reverted to her mother. On her mother's death in 1799 ownership of Darraghville passed to her nephew George Newton. It subsequently became a convent.

Dudley was a member of the popular drinking club called the Monks of the Screw (or the Order of St. Patrick), and he was one of the original shareholders in the Bank of Ireland. He lived at St. Stephen's Green in central Dublin.

He was remembered as a man "whose amiable qualities, whether considered as friend, senator or judge, make his loss truly irreparable".

== Sources ==
- Johnson-Liik, E.M. MPs in Dublin: Companion to History of the Irish Parliament 1692-1800 Ulster Historical Foundation 2006
- Irish Times 12 April 2017
- Gentleman's Magazine 1785
- Hibernian Magazine 1784
- Walker's Magazine 1787
