= John Hely-Hutchinson (secretary of state) =

Irish politician (1724–1794)

John Hely-Hutchinson FRS
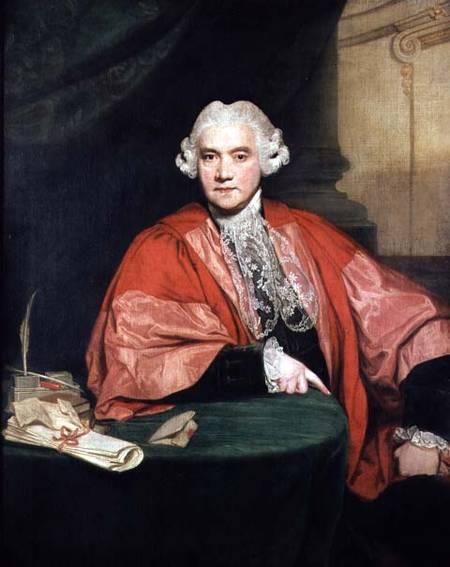
- Portrait, oil on canvas, of Provost John Hely-Hutchinson by Sir Joshua Reynolds.

21st Provost of Trinity College Dublin
- In office 30 July 1774 – 1 August 1794
- Preceded by: Francis Andrews
- Succeeded by: Richard Murray

Principal Secretary of State for Ireland
- In office 11 October 1766 – 29 July 1794
- Monarch: George III
- Preceded by: Philip Tisdall
- Succeeded by: Edmund Henry Pery

Member of Parliament for Taghmon
- In office 11 May 1790 – 3 June 1794
- Preceded by: Robert Stubber
- Succeeded by: Christopher Hely-Hutchinson

Member of Parliament for Cork City
- In office 12 May 1761 – 11 May 1790
- Preceded by: Thomas Newenham
- Succeeded by: John Hely-Hutchinson

Member of Parliament for Lanesborough
- In office 4 March 1759 – 12 May 1761
- Preceded by: Matthias Earbery
- Succeeded by: Henry Gore

Personal details
- Born: 13 June 1724 Mallow, County Cork, Ireland
- Died: 4 September 1794 (aged 70) Buxton, Derbyshire, England
- Resting place: Trinity College Chapel
- Party: Irish Patriot Party
- Spouse: Christiana Nixon (m. 1751)
- Relations: John Hely-Hutchinson (Nephew)
- Children: 5, including John
- Education: Trinity College, Dublin (B.A., 1744); King's Inns (B.L., 1748)

Military service
- Allegiance: Great Britain
- Branch/service: British Army
- Rank: Major

John Hely later Hely-Hutchinson (13 June 1724 – 4 September 1794) was an Anglo-Irish lawyer, politician, and academic who served as the 21st Provost of Trinity College Dublin from 1774 to 1794. He also served as Principal Secretary of State for Ireland from 1766 to 1794. He was a member of the Irish House of Commons from 1759 to 1794.

== Early life ==
He was born at Gortroe, Mallow, County Cork in 1724. He was the son of Francis Hely, a gentleman of County Cork, was educated at Trinity College Dublin (BA 1744), and was called to the Irish bar in 1748. He took the additional name of Hutchinson on his marriage in 1751 to Christiana Nixon, heiress of her uncle, Richard Hutchinson.

== Career ==
He was elected member of the Irish House of Commons for the borough of Lanesborough in 1759, but from 1761 to 1790, he represented Cork City. He at first attached himself to the patriotic party in opposition to the government, and although he afterwards joined the administration he never abandoned his advocacy of popular measures.

It was around this time that Hely-Hutchinson sold Frescati House in Blackrock, Dublin, now the site of the Frescati shopping Centre.

He was a man of brilliant and versatile ability, whom Lord Townshend, the Lord Lieutenant, described as by far the most powerful man in parliament. William Gerard Hamilton said of him that Ireland never bred a more able, nor any country a more honest man. Hely-Hutchinson was, however, an inveterate place-hunter, and there was a point in Lord North's witticism that if you were to give him the whole of Great Britain and Ireland for an estate, he would ask the Isle of Man for a potato garden.

After a session or two in parliament, he was made a privy councillor and prime Serjeant-at-law; and from this time he gave a general, though by no means invariable support to the government. In 1767, the ministry contemplated an increase of the army establishment in Ireland from 12,000 to 15,000 men, but the Augmentation Bill met with strenuous opposition, not only from Flood, Ponsonby and the habitual opponents of the government, but from the Undertakers, or proprietors of boroughs, on whom the government had hitherto relied to secure them a majority in the House of Commons.

It therefore became necessary for Lord Townshend to turn to other methods for procuring support. Early in 1768, an English Act was passed for the increase of the army, and a message from the king setting forth the necessity for the measure was laid before the House of Commons in Dublin. An address favourable to the government policy was, however, rejected; and Hely-Hutchinson, together with the speaker and the attorney-general, did their utmost both in public and private to obstruct the bill. Parliament was dissolved in May 1768, and the lord lieutenant set about the task of purchasing or otherwise securing a majority in the new parliament. Peerages, pensions, and places were bestowed lavishly on those whose support could be thus secured; Hely-Hutchinson was won over by the concession that the Irish army should be established by the authority of an Irish act of parliament instead of an English one.

The Augmentation Bill was carried out in the session of 1769 by a large majority. Hely-Hutchinson's support had been so valuable that he received as a reward an addition of £1,000 a year to the salary of his sinecure of alnager, a major's commission in a cavalry regiment, and a promise of the Secretaryship of State. He was at this time one of the most brilliant debaters in the Irish parliament, and he was enjoying an exceedingly lucrative practice at the bar. This income, however, together with his well-salaried sinecure, and his place as prime serjeant, he surrendered in 1774, to become provost of Trinity College, although the statute requiring the provost to be in holy orders had to be dispensed with in his favour.

For this great academic position Hely-Hutchinson was in no way qualified, and his appointment to it for purely political service to the government was justly criticised with much asperity. His conduct in using his position as provost to secure the parliamentary representation of the university for his eldest son brought him into conflict with Duigenan, who attacked him in Lacrymae academicae, and involved him in a duel with a Mr Doyle; while a similar attempt on behalf of his second son in 1790 led to his being accused before a select committee of the House of Commons of impropriety as returning officer. But although without scholarship Hely-Hutchinson was an efficient provost, during whose rule material benefits were conferred on Trinity College.

He continued to occupy a prominent place in parliament, where he advocated free trade, the relief of the Catholics from penal legislation, and the reform of parliament. He was one of the very earliest politicians to recognise the soundness of Adam Smith's views on trade; and he quoted from the Wealth of Nations, adopting some of its principles, in his Commercial Restraints of Ireland, published in 1779, which Lecky pronounces one of the best specimens of political literature produced in Ireland in the latter half of the 18th century.

In the same year, the economic condition of Ireland being the cause of great anxiety, the government solicited from several leading politicians their opinions on the state of the country with suggestions for a remedy. Hely-Hutchinson's response was a remarkably able state paper (manuscript in the Record Office), which also showed clear traces of the influence of Adam Smith. The Commercial Restraints, condemned by the authorities as seditious, went far to restore Hely-Hutchinson's popularity which had been damaged by his greed for office. Not less enlightened were his views on the Catholic question. In a speech in parliament on Catholic education in 1782 the provost declared that Catholic students were in fact to be found at Trinity College, but that he desired their presence thereto be legalised on the largest scale. "My opinion", he said,

"is strongly against sending Roman Catholics abroad for education, nor would establish Popish colleges at home. The advantage of being admitted into the university of Dublin will be very great to Catholics; they need not be obliged to attend the divinity professor, they may have one of their own; and would have a part of the public money applied to their use, to the support of several poor lads as sizars, and to provide premiums for persons of merit, for I would have them go into examinations and make no distinction between them and the Protestants but such as merit might claim".

After sketching a scheme for increasing the number of diocesan schools where Roman Catholics might receive free education, he went on to urge that

"It is certainly a matter of importance that the education of their priests should be as perfect as possible, and that if they have any prejudices they should be prejudiced in favour of their own country. The Roman Catholics should receive the best education in the established university at the public expense; but by no means should Popish colleges be allowed, for by them we should again have the press groaning with themes of controversy, and subjects of religious disputation that have long slept in oblivion would again awake, and awaken with them all the worst passions of the human mind".

In 1777, Hely-Hutchinson became Secretary of State. When Henry Grattan in 1782 moved an address to the king containing a declaration of Irish legislative independence, Hely-Hutchinson supported the attorney-general's motion postponing the question; but on 16 April, after the Easter recess, he read a message from the Lord Lieutenant, the Duke of Portland, giving the king's permission for the House to consider the matter, and he expressed his sympathy with the popular cause which Grattan on the same day brought to a triumphant issue. Hely-Hutchinson supported the opposition on the regency question in 1788, and one of his last votes in the House was in favour of parliamentary reform. In 1790 he exchanged the constituency of Cork for that of Taghmon in County Wexford, for which borough he remained a member until his death at Buxton, Derbyshire on 4 September 1794.

In March 1794, he was elected a Fellow of the Royal Society.

== Family ==
In 1783, his wife Christiana had been created Baroness Donoughmore and on her death in 1788, his eldest son Richard (1756–1825) succeeded to the title. Richard, an ardent advocate of Catholic emancipation, was created Viscount Donoughmore in 1797, and in 1800 (having voted for the Union, hoping to secure Catholic emancipation from the united parliament) he was further created Earl of Donoughmore of Knocklofty, being succeeded first by his brother John Hely-Hutchinson (1757–1832) and then by his nephew John, 3rd Earl (1787–1851), from whom the title descended.

Parliament of Ireland
Preceded by Anthony Marlay; Thomas Burgh	Member of Parliament for Lanesborough; 1759–1761; With: Anthony Marlay	Succeeded by William Harward; Henry Gore
Preceded by Thomas Newenham; Emanuel Pigott	Member of Parliament for Cork City; 1761–1790; With: Sir John Freke, 3rd Bt 1761–1764; William Brabazon Ponsonby 1764–1776; Richard Longfield 1776–1783; Augustus Louis Carre Warren 1783–1790	Succeeded by Hon. John Hely-Hutchinson; Richard Longfield
Preceded by Robert Stubber; Hon. John Hely-Hutchinson	Member of Parliament for Taghmon; 1790–1794; With: Warden Flood	Succeeded by Hon. Christopher Hely-Hutchinson; Warden Flood
Academic offices
Preceded by Francis Andrews	Provost of Trinity College Dublin; 1775–1794	Succeeded by Richard Murray
