= Christopher Hely-Hutchinson =

Irish barrister and Member of Parliament

Christopher Hely-Hutchinson (1767–1826) was an Irish lawyer, politician and soldier.

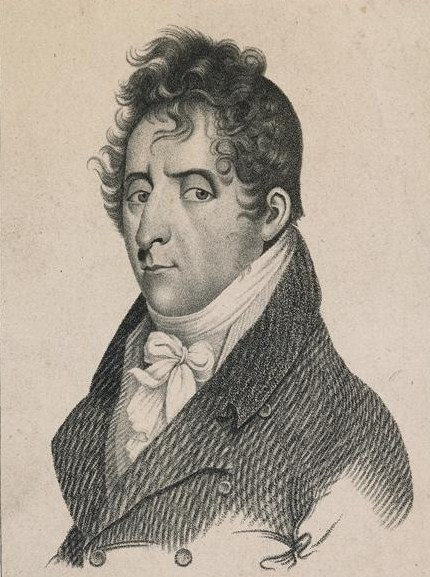
Christopher Hely-Hutchinson

== Early life ==
The fifth son of John Hely-Hutchinson, he was born on 5 April 1767. Educated at Trinity College Dublin, and at the Temple, he was called to the Irish bar in 1792. His father's influence helped in his profession.

== Irish Parliament ==
In 1795 Hely-Hutchinson entered the Irish House of Commons, succeeding his father as MP for the borough of Taghmon, in County Wexford. He was a supporter of Earl Fitzwilliam, who was Lord Lieutenant of Ireland at the time of his election. Hely-Hutchinson was strongly opposed to the administration of Lord Camden who succeeded later in 1795, and becoming disgusted at the course of events he withdrew from parliament in 1796.

== Military service ==
On the outbreak of the Irish Rebellion of 1798, Hely-Hutchinson enlisted as a volunteer under his brother John. He saw action in the Battle of Ballinamuck, where he was instrumental in capturing the French generals Lafontaine and Sarrazin, and was commended for his bravery by Lord Cornwallis.

Hely-Hutchinson was strongly opposed to the Acts of Union 1800, and at a meeting of the Irish Bar proposed to resist with the sword. After the passing of the measures, he left Ireland. He took part as aide-de-camp of his brother in the Anglo-Russian invasion of Holland, and was wounded in the Battle of Alkmar. In January 1801 he was raised to the rank of lieutenant-colonel, and accompanied his brother John as a volunteer in the expedition to Egypt under Sir Ralph Abercromby.

== In the United Kingdom Parliament ==
On the elevation of his brother John to the peerage as Lord Hutchinson, Hely-Hutchinson succeeded him in 1802 as MP for Cork City. He held the seat until his defeat at the 1812 general election, defeated by Nicholas Colthurst. At the 1818 general election, he regained the seat, retaining it to his death. On policy towards Ireland, Hely-Hutchinson followed the family line of favouring better treatment of the Catholics. He criticised the refusal to fulfil the conditions of the Union; and was vehement against Lord Castlereagh, the Foreign Secretary. He voted in favour of Sir Francis Burdett's plan of parliamentary reform, and one of the last speeches he made was directed against emigration to Canada as a panacea for Irish distress.

Hely-Hutchinson supported the continuation of the Napoleonic Wars. In 1806 he accompanied Lord Hutchinson on a diplomatic mission to St. Petersburg and Berlin. In 1807 he took part in the Polish campaign, fighting in the Russian ranks. He was wounded in the battle of Eylau, and was also present at the Battle of Friedland. After the Peace of Tilsit he visited Moscow, and on his return to England in the beginning of 1809 he opposed the ministry for their mismanagement of the war, and particularly for the Convention of Cintra.

== Later life ==
After 1815, Hely-Hutchinson took to visiting Paris with his family. He fell out of favour with the Bourbon government there, however, for his liberal associations and opposition to the legitimist intervention in Spain. He died after a lingering illness at his residence, Ben Lomond House, Downshire Hill Road, Hampstead, on 26 August 1826.

== Family ==
Hely-Hutchinson married, first, on 24 December 1792, the daughter of Sir James Bond, who died on 30 March 1796, and by her had issue a daughter (2 November 1793) and a son John (March 1795); secondly, Anne, widow of Charles Bridges Woodcock, daughter of Maurice Crosbie, dean of Limerick, and sister to William Crosbie, 4th Baron Brandon.

== Notes ==
Attribution

This article incorporates text from a publication now in the public domain: Stephen, Leslie; Lee, Sidney, eds. (1891). "Hely-Hutchinson, Christopher". Dictionary of National Biography. Vol. 25. London: Smith, Elder & Co.
