= Thomas Pigott (British Army officer) =

Engineer and politician (1734–1793)

Thomas Pigott (13 October 1734 – 12 October 1793) was an Anglo-Irish military engineer and politician. He was Chief Engineer of the Ordnance in Ireland from 1776 until his death. He purchased a seat for Taghmon in the Irish House of Commons in 1776, and was returned for Midleton in 1783 and 1790. He was Governor of Cork from 1782 to 1789.

Pigott was a major in the 4th Horse when he transferring to the Corps of Engineers of Ireland. Charles Vallancey, who succeeded Pigott as Chief Engineer, had felt better qualified that him at his 1776 appointment, describing Pigott as "a dancing master, a master of ceremonies at [Dublin] Castle. Pigott was promoted to colonel in 1782 and major general at his death.
