= Richard Hely-Hutchinson, 4th Earl of Donoughmore =

British Conservative politician

The Right Honourable The Earl of Donoughmore FRS PC
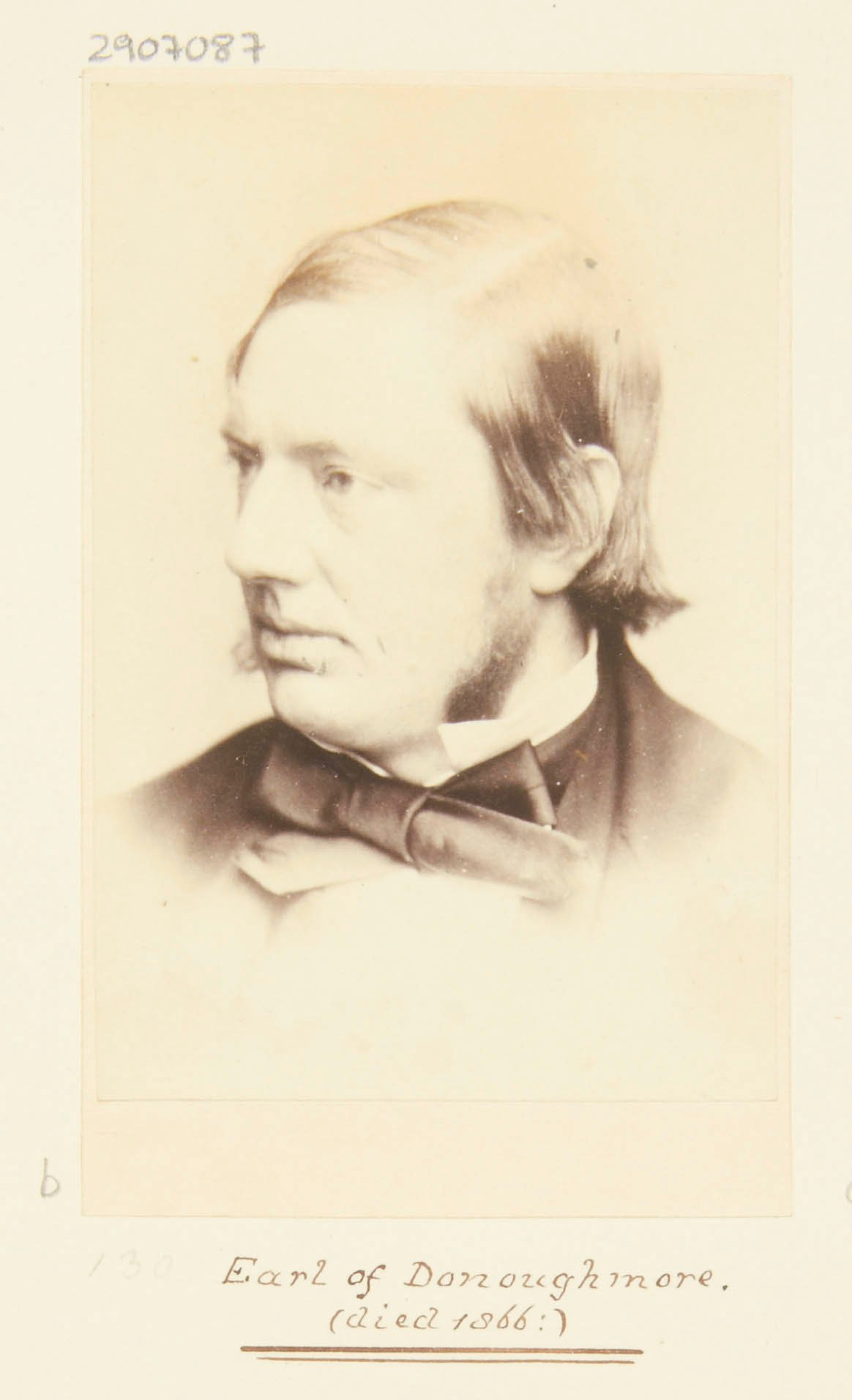

President of the Board of Trade
- In office 3 March 1859 – 11 June 1859
- Monarch: Victoria
- Prime Minister: The Earl of Derby
- Preceded by: Joseph Warner Henley
- Succeeded by: Thomas Milner Gibson

Personal details
- Born: 4 April 1823
- Died: 22 February 1866 (aged 42)
- Party: Conservative
- Spouse: Thomasina Steele (d. 1890)

Richard John Hely-Hutchinson, 4th Earl of Donoughmore PC FRS (4 April 1823 – 22 February 1866), styled Viscount Suirdale between 1832 and 1851, was a British Conservative politician.

== Background ==
Donoughmore was the son of John Hely-Hutchinson, 3rd Earl of Donoughmore, and the Hon. Margaret, daughter of Luke Gardiner, 1st Viscount Mountjoy.

== Political career ==
Donoughmore was appointed High Sheriff of Tipperary for 1847.

He entered the House of Lords on the death of his father in 1851. He held office as Vice-President of the Board of Trade and Paymaster General in Lord Derby's second government, and was promoted to the actual presidency of the Board of Trade in February 1859 on the resignation of J. W. Henley over the abortive 1859 Reform Bill. He remained in this post until the government fell in June of the same year. In 1858 he was admitted to the Privy Council.

In 1865 he was elected a Fellow of the Royal Society.

== Family ==
Lord Donoughmore married Thomasina Jocelyn, daughter of Walter Steele, in 1847. Their fifth son the Hon. Sir Walter Hely-Hutchinson was a diplomat. Donoughmore died in February 1866, aged 42, and was succeeded in the earldom by his eldest son, John. The Countess of Donoughmore died in May 1890.

Colonel Lewis Vivian Loyd was married on 14 August 1879 to Lady Mary Sophia Hely Hutchinson (1854–1936), daughter of the 4th Earl of Donoughmore, a writer and translator with whom he had three children: two sons and a daughter.

== Freemasonry ==
He was Intitated in Lodge No.12, in Ireland and was Senior Grand Warden of the Grand Lodge of Ireland for 1846.. He was made an Honorary Member of Lodge Holyrood House (St Luke's), No.44, on 7 January 1846.

Political offices
Preceded by Robert Lowe	Paymaster General; 1858–1859	Succeeded by Lord Lovaine
Preceded by Robert Lowe	Vice-President of the Board of Trade; 1858–1859	Succeeded by Lord Lovaine
Preceded by Joseph Warner Henley	President of the Board of Trade; 1859	Succeeded by Thomas Milner Gibson
Peerage of Ireland
Preceded by John Hely-Hutchinson	Earl of Donoughmore; 1851–1866	Succeeded by John Hely-Hutchinson
