= Knocklofty House =

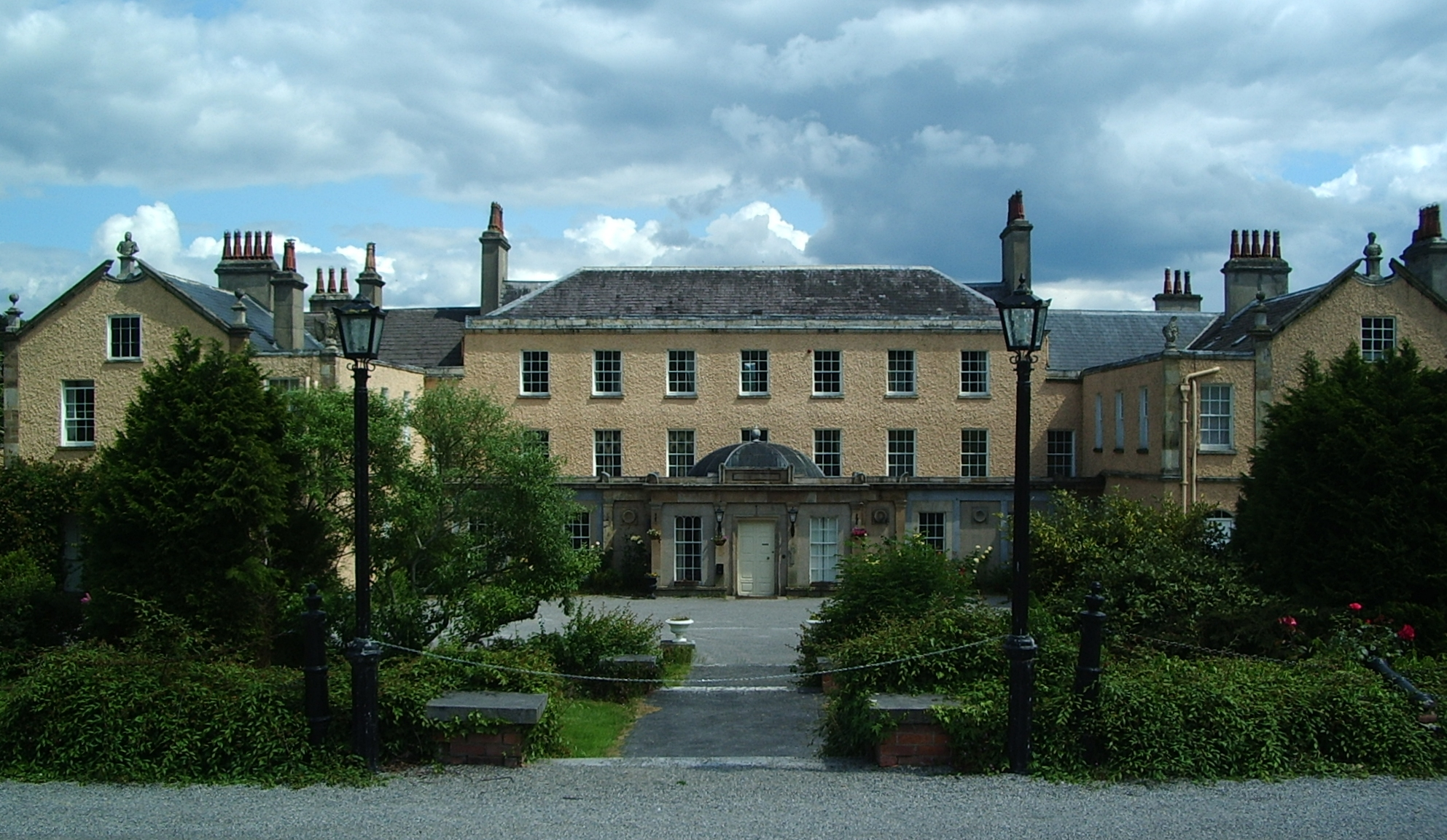
- Front façade 2011

- Location within Ireland
- 52°20′40″N 07°47′26″W
- Location: Clonmel, County Tipperary, Ireland

History
- Built: c.1790
- Built for: Earl of Donoughmore

Knocklofty House is a large Georgian country house that is situated near Clonmel in County Tipperary, Ireland. It previously operated as a hotel.

== Location ==
It is situated on the northern bank of the River Suir approximately 6.5 kilometers from the town of Clonmel via the R665 regional road.

== History ==
The main block was built for the 1st Earl of Donoughmore c.1790, it received alterations and additions in the 19th and 20th centuries which retain the Georgian style. The house remained in the family's ownership until the 1980s.

As of 2022, the house remains vacant and in a derelict condition under the control of Cerberus Capital Management.

== See also ==
- Marlfield House, Clonmel
