= Christiana Hely-Hutchinson, 1st Baroness Donoughmore =

Irish suo jure hereditary peer (d. 1788)

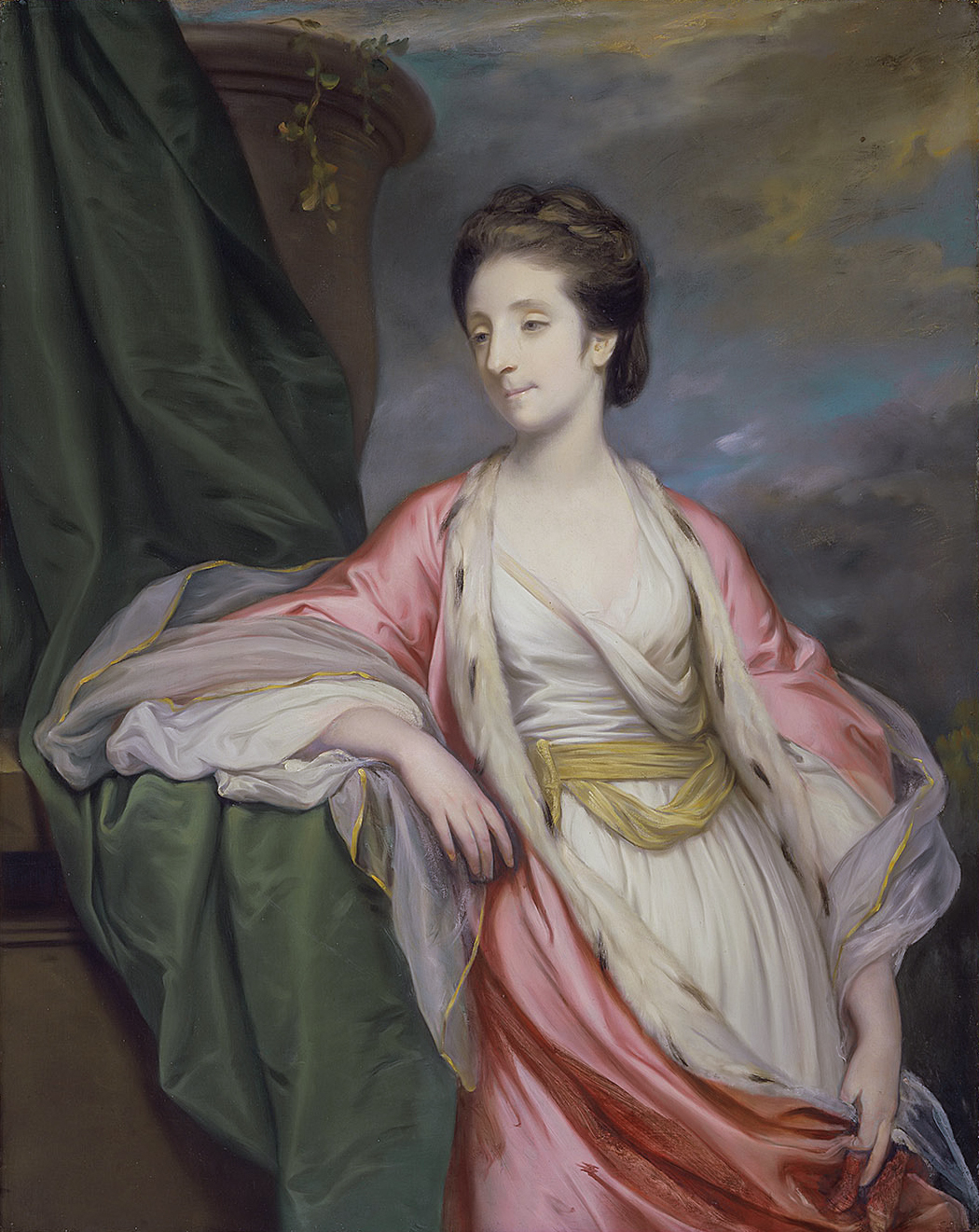
Christiana Hely-Hutchinson (Joshua Reynolds, 1766)

Christiana Hely-Hutchinson, 1st Baroness Donoughmore (née Nickson) (bapt. 23 February 1732 Aghold – Palmerston 24 June 1788) was a suo jure hereditary peer.

She is an ancestress of Katharine, Duchess of Kent.

Christiana (Christina) Nickson was the daughter of Abraham Nickson (sometime Nickeson or Nixon) of Munny, County Wicklow, and grand-niece and heir of Richard Hutchinson of Knocklofty.

She married Rt. Hon. John Hely-Hutchinson (1724–1794) MP, son of Francis Hely of Gertrough, by his spouse Prudence née Earbury, on 8 June 1751. He added Hutchinson to his surname in consequence of the marriage, which brought him her considerable fortune.

They had ten children:

- Lt.-Gen. Richard Hely-Hutchinson, 1st Earl of Donoughmore (29 January 1756 – 22 August 1825)
- General John Hely-Hutchinson, 2nd Earl of Donoughmore (15 May 1757 – 29 June 1832)
- Hon. Francis Hely-Hutchinson (26 October 1759 – 16 December 1827), Collector of the Customs in the port of Dublin
- Hon. Augustus Abraham Hely-Hutchinson (20 March 1766 – 10 June 1834), Commissioner of the Customs in London and in Ireland
- Christopher Hely-Hutchinson (5 April 1767 – 26 August 1826), MP for Cork
- Lorenzo Hely-Hutchinson (6 October 1768 – 28 November 1822), in holy orders; Prebendary of Coolstuff, County Wexford, 1811–1822.
- Prudence Hely Hutchinson (b. ca.1764–1771; d. 12 June 1820 at Bath) unmarried
- Mary Hely Hutchinson (about 1772 – 30 October 1820) married 21 June 1791 Thomas Smith, barrister (19 March 1755 - December 1799), and had issue
- Margaret (Margaretta) Hely Hutchinson (about 1774; d. March 1818 in Bristol) unmarried
- Christiana (Christina) Hely Hutchinson (d. February 1825 in London) unmarried

Her husband declined any peerage for himself. On 20 September 1783, she was created, in her own right, a hereditary peer as Baroness Donoughmore, of Knocklofty, County Tipperary, Kingdom of Ireland. However, as a woman, she was unable to sit in the Irish House of Lords.

Peerage of Ireland
New creation	Baroness Donoughmore; 1783–1788	Succeeded by Richard Hely-Hutchinson
