= John Hely-Hutchinson, 3rd Earl of Donoughmore =

Irish politician and peer

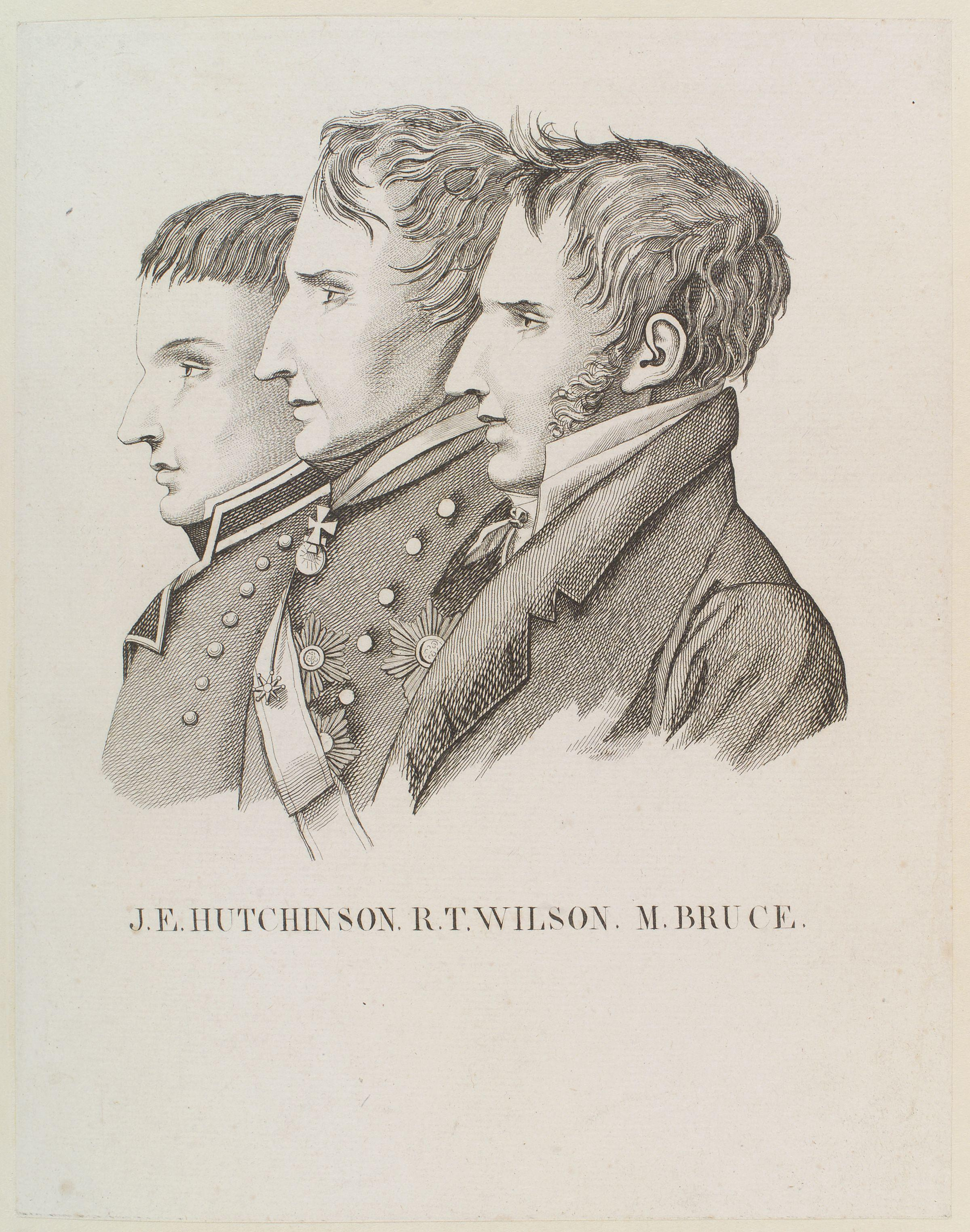
Lord Donoughmore to the left of the picture, with Sir Robert Wilson and Michael Bruce.

John Hely-Hutchinson, 3rd Earl of Donoughmore KP, PC (I), (1787 – 14 September 1851), was an Irish politician and peer.

== Background ==
He was the son of the Hon. Francis Hely-Hutchinson (d. 1827) (the son of Christiana Nickson, 1st Baroness of Donoughmore of Knocklofty).

== Political career ==
He represented County Tipperary in the House of Commons of the United Kingdom as a Whig. From 1832 he sat in the House of Lords, having succeeded to his uncle's peerages, specifically the Viscountcy of Hutchinson.

== Treason trial in France ==
As a captain of the 1st Foot Guards, he helped in the escape from prison of Napoleon's postmaster-general, Comte de Lavalette. He was put on trial in Paris, along with Robert Wilson and Michael Bruce, on charges of aiding in the count's escape from prison. The trial took place at the Cour d'assises from 22 April to 24 April 1816. All three men were convicted and sentenced to three months' imprisonment.

== Family ==
He married the Hon. Margaret Gardiner (daughter of Luke Gardiner, 1st Viscount Mountjoy) on 15 June 1822. They had two children:

- Richard John Hely-Hutchinson, Viscount Suirdale, later 4th Earl of Donoughmore. (b. 4 April 1823; d. 22 February 1866)
- Margaret Hely-Hutchinson (d. young 1828)

He married, secondly, Barbara Reynell, daughter of Lt. Col. William Reynell. They had four children:

- Capt. Hon. John William Hely-Hutchinson (b. 1 September 1829; d. 16 July 1855: KIA Crimean War) mar. circa 1851 a commoner, Eliza Stratton, without his father's blessing, causing a separation from the family. (There is no record of this marriage that can be found online at this time. The reference footnote given does not have more than a name and birth date for this man. If the person who wrote this about a marriage would kindly reference this remark, it would be appreciated.)
- Lady Kathleen Alicia Hely-Hutchinson (d. 22 April 1892), mar. 3 December 1863 D W Ramsay Carrick Buchanan, of Drumpellier and Corsewall (d. 4 May 1925)
- Lady Frances Margaret Hely-Hutchinson (d. 11 April 1866), mar. 22 September 1858 Lt Col Arthur Tremayne (d. 14 November 1905), and had issue
- Lady Jane Louisa Hely-Hutchinson (d. 29 August 1868)

Parliament of the United Kingdom
| Preceded by William Bagwell; Francis Aldborough Prittie | Member of Parliament for County Tipperary; 1826–1830; With: Francis Aldborough Prittie | Succeeded by Francis Aldborough Prittie; Thomas Wyse |
| Preceded by Francis Aldborough Prittie; Thomas Wyse | Member of Parliament for County Tipperary; 1831–1832; With: Thomas Wyse | Succeeded by Thomas Wyse; Robert Otway-Cave |
Honorary titles
| Preceded by The Earl of Donoughmore | Lord Lieutenant of Tipperary; 1832–1851 | Succeeded by The Viscount Lismore |
Peerage of Ireland
| Preceded by John Hely-Hutchinson | Earl of Donoughmore; 1832–1851 | Succeeded by Richard Hely-Hutchinson |
