= Hemphill (surname) =

Hemphill is a surname originating from Scotland and is synonymous with similar names such as Hempel and Hemmel. As a Scottish clan, the Hemphills were considered a border clan, those clans geographically situated closest to Scotland's border with England. The Hemphill clan identifies itself with the Cunningham tartan. Notable people with the surname include:

- Alexander Hemphill (1921–1986), American lawyer and politician
- Arlo Hemphill (born 1971), American wilderness advocate, marine biologist, oceanographer, conservationist, naturalist, and actor
- Barbara Hemphill (died 1858), Irish novelist
- Bret Hemphill (born 1971), American baseball player and coach
- Brian Hemphill (born ?), American academic administrator, researcher, author, and college president
- Bruce Hemphill (born 1963), South African businessman
- Charles Hemphill, 1st Baron Hemphill (1822–1908), Irish baron, politician, and businessman
- Charlie Hemphill (1876–1953), American baseball player; brother of Frank Hemphill
- C. Scott Hemphill (born ?), American legal academic and law professor
- Darryl Hemphill (born 1960), American football player
- Doug Hemphill (born ?), American film audio engineer
- Essex Hemphill (1957–1995) American poet, writer, and activist
- Fitzroy Hemphill, 3rd Baron Hemphill (1860–1930), British baron and politician
- Frank Hemphill (1878–1950), American baseball player; brother of Charlie Hemphill
- George Hemphill (born 1951), American art dealer and curator
- Greg Hemphill (born 1970), Scottish comedian, actor, writer, and director
- Helen Hemphill (born 1955), American children's literature author
- Henry Hemphill (1830–1914), American malacologist and conchologist
- Herbert Waide Hemphill, Jr. (1929–1998), American folk art collector, curator, and philanthropist
- Jacob Hemphill (born ?), American guitarist and vocalist for the band SOJA
- Jessie Mae Hemphill (1923–2006), American electric guitarist, songwriter, and vocalist
- Jim Hemphill (born 1971), American filmmaker, film historian, and writer
- John Hemphill (disambiguation), several people
- Joseph Hemphill, (1770–1842), American politician and lawyer
- Julius Hemphill (1938–1995), American jazz composer and saxophone player
- LaBreeska Hemphill (1940–2015), American Southern gospel performer and author
- Lyle Hemphill (born 1980), American football coach and former player
- Mark W. Hemphill (born ?), American railroad dispatcher and consultant, magazine editor, and historian
- Maureen Hemphill (born 1937), Canadian politician
- Meg Hemphill (born 1996), Japanese track and field athlete
- Patrick Martyn-Hemphill, 5th Baron Hemphill (1928–2012), British baron
- Paul Hemphill (1936–2009), American journalist and author
- Phebe Hemphill (born 1960), American sculptor
- Phillip Hemphill (fl. 1834), American soldier and co-founder of the city of Rome, Georgia
- Robert W. Hemphill (1915–1983), American politician, judge, and US Air Force pilot
- Ryan Hemphill (born 1981), American race car driver
- Samuel Hemphill (1859–1927), Irish Anglican priest
- Shelton Hemphill (1906–1960), American jazz trumpeter
- Shirley Hemphill (1947–1999), American stand-up comedian and actress
- Sid Hemphill (1876–1963), American blues multi-instrumentalist and bandleader
- Stephanie Hemphill (born ?), American young adult author and poet
- Tahir Hemphill (born 1972), American multimedia artist, ethnolinguist, and design researcher
- William Hemphill (1842–1902), American businessman, politician, and Confederate Army colonel
