= Hemphill =

Hemphill may refer to:

- Hemphill (surname)

== Places ==
- Hemphill Island, a small, mainly ice-covered Antarctic island
- Hemphill, Kentucky
- Hemphill, Texas
- Hemphill County, Texas

== Title ==
- Baron Hemphill, a title in the Peerage of the United Kingdom

== Music ==
- The Hemphills, former gospel music group originally from Bastrop, Louisiana
