= Washington Review =

American bi-monthly journal

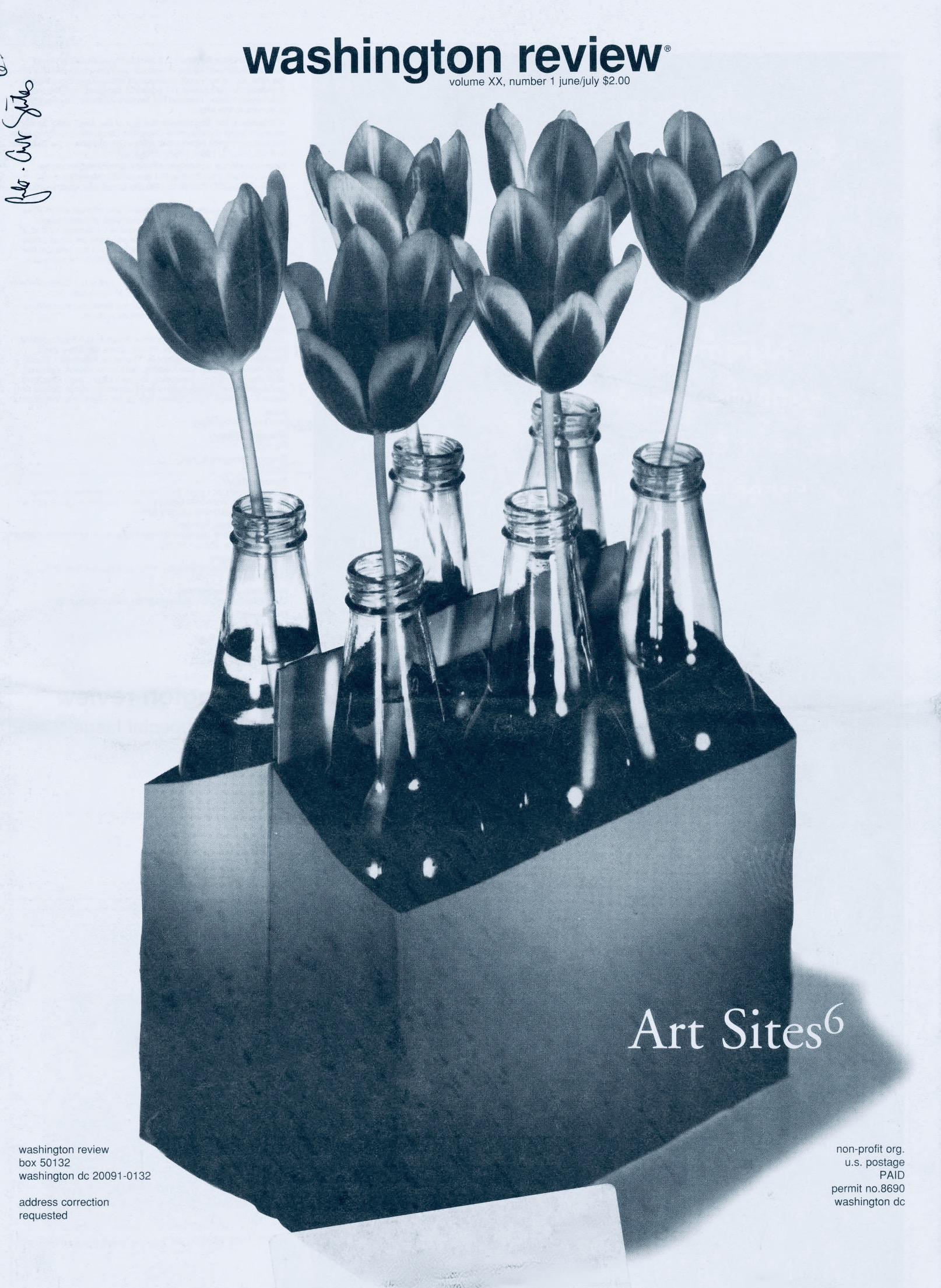
- Art Sites 6, 1994 edition
- Discipline: The arts
- Language: English
- Edited by: Clarissa Wittenberg; Mary Swift

Publication details
- History: 1974–2002
- Publisher: Friends of the Washington Review of the Arts (Washington, D.C., United States)
- Frequency: Bi-monthly

Standard abbreviations
- ISO 4: Wash. Rev.

Indexing
- ISSN: 0163-903X
- OCLC no.: 4526135

The Washington Review was an American bi-monthly journal of arts and literature published from 1974 to 2002 in Washington, D.C. The Review brought together information about art, dance, poetry, literature, music, photography, sculpture, theater, and events. The journal published artwork, essays, poems, commentaries as well as interviews by and about artists, curators, writers, performers, poets, choreographers, and directors, both emerging and notable.

== History ==
The Washington Review was founded and edited by Clarissa K. Wittenberg. Inspired by The Paris Review, in 1974 she started the journal initially with Jean Lewton, a colleague with whom she had worked with at X magazine. Wittenberg wanted to document the underrepresented avant-garde culture of Washington. Review topics covered poetry, fiction, essays on the arts, book and art reviews, plays, interviews, photographs, graphics, and original artwork.

The first Issue of the Washington Review appeared on May/July 1975. It was published by the Friends of the Washington Review of the Arts, Inc., a non-profit, tax-except educational organization. Tabloid-sized, it used two of the large pages per issue for poetry, and was saddle-stapled on high-quality newsprint. The Review had a circulation of 2,000 with 700 subscriptions, and was in 10 libraries.

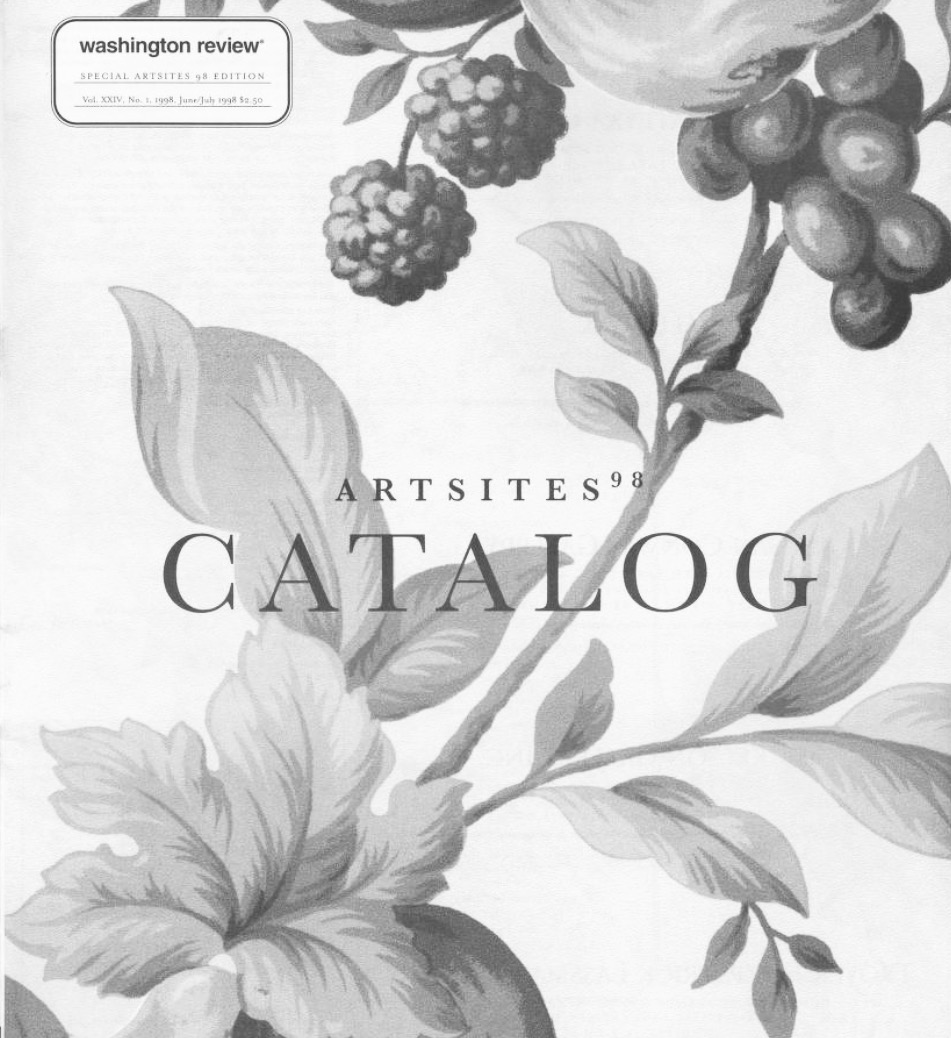
Magazine Cover of the Washington Review, the special artists 98 Edition, No. 1998, June/July 1998

Wittenberg worked with local contributors to develop the Review into an arts journal: gallerist George Hemphill, artist Clark V. Fox, dancer Maida Withers. The DC Commission on the Arts and Humanities was a regular provider of grants, along with a handful of local foundations.

Mary Swift served as both chairman and president. Her key roles were as managing editor, interviewer, journalist, and photographer-in-residence from the journal's inception to its closure in 2002. Swift's contributions included photographs, reviews of art exhibitions, and interviews with dancer Lucinda Childs, painter Robert Indiana, sculptor Anne Truitt, painter Howard Mehring and museum director and gallerist Walter Hopps. Swift interviewed DC artist Martin Puryear in the first article of his career. For the February/March 1980 issue, Swift took the photographs and interviewed artist William Christenberry in his studio, including his collection of vintage signs, landscapes, and abandoned buildings from his home state Tuscaloosa, Alabama.

The Washington Review ceased publication in 2002, when Wittenberg and Swift retired.

== Legacy ==
The full set of Washington Review journals are in the Library of Congress and the Mary Swift Papers (1973-2004) at the Archives of American Art at the Smithsonian Institution.

In November 2016, Swift donated thousands of contact sheets, negative, and prints, and more than one hundred cassette tapes of artist interviews to the archives of the Smithsonian Institution. Swift's collection measure 8.2 linear feet and date from 1973-2004. Most of the collection contains photographs that Swift took while working for the Washington Review.

== See also ==
- List of avant-garde magazines
- Arts journalism
