= Liz Lerman =

American choreographer

- Born: December 25, 1947 (age 78); Los Angeles, California, United States
- Education: Bennington College; University of Maryland, College Park (BA); George Washington University (MA)
- Known for: Choreography
- Spouse: Jon Spelman (storyteller)

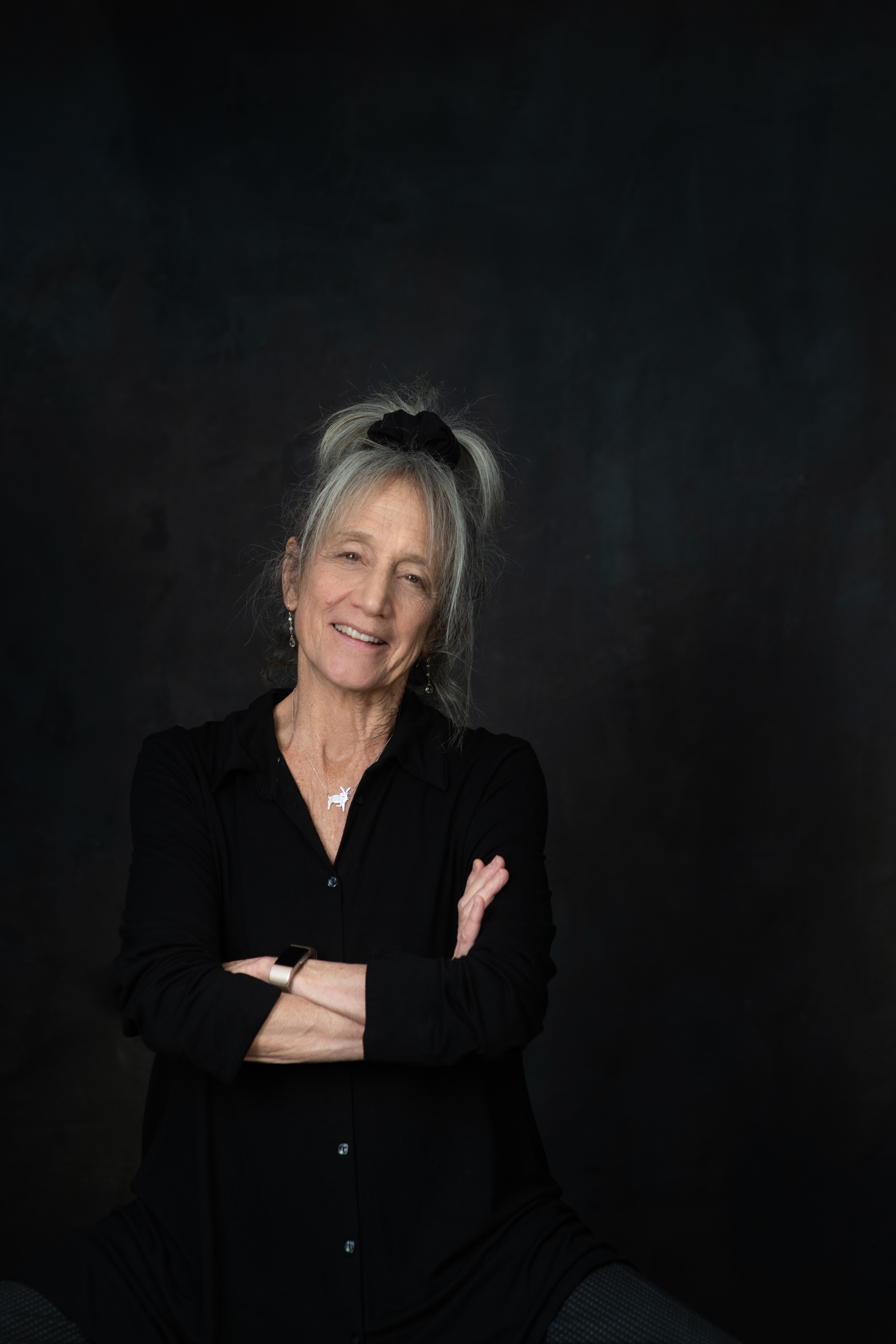
Liz Lerman in 2022. Photographer Credit: Christine Johnson

Elizabeth Ann Lerman (born December 25, 1947) is a Jewish American dance choreographer, visionary artist, writer, educator, and speaker. Lerman is the recipient of numerous awards including a 2002 MacArthur "Genius Grant," 2014 Dance/USA Honor Award, 2017 Jacob's Pillow Dance Award, and a 2023 Guggenheim Fellowship. She founded and led the Liz Lerman Dance Exchange from 1976 until 2011 where she cultivated the company's unique multi-generational ensemble into a leading force in contemporary dance. Lerman invented the Critical Response Process (CRP), a four step method for giving and receiving helpful feedback. She is the author of several books and her work has been commissioned by many institutions, among them Arena Stage, The Kennedy Center, Harvard Law School, and Portsmouth Music Hall. Lerman is an Institute Professor at Arizona State University and Fellow at the Center for the Study of Race and Democracy.

== Early life ==
Liz Lerman was born in Los Angeles, California on December 25, 1947. Lerman describes being a "wild child", as she ran up giant slides, jumped through their flooded backyard, and begged for dance classes which she finally began when her family left California for Washington, D.C. in the early 1950s. At age 14 in 1962, Liz Lerman danced in Washington, D.C., for President Kennedy as part of a group from the Interlochen Arts Camp in Interlochen, Michigan.

Lerman's father, Philip Ephraim Lerman was born and raised in Milwaukee, Wisconsin where he became active in progressive Jewish youth groups. He was a labor organizer for the Congress of Industrial Organizations (CIO) and served in World War II as a medic. Eventually, Phil worked in a tire store in Milwaukee that Lerman's grandfather had opened after a hazardous journey out of Russia in the early 1900s. Lerman's father remained a dedicated political organizer and served as the Secretary of Industry, Labor and Human Relations for the State of Wisconsin under Governor Lucey from 1971 to 1977. Lerman's mother, Anne Louise Levy, was raised in San Francisco and was one of the first women in a Ph.D. program in mathematics at University of California, Berkeley. She worked as a draftsperson during World War II and eventually supported Dane County's public mental health network as a Counselor and Administrator. Both parents nurtured Lerman's artistic growth, but in very different ways. Her father insisted on understanding the community and social context of art, while her mother pushed her toward radicalism, independent thought, and asymmetry.

Through her father's civil rights activism, Lerman was highly aware of the inequities present in Milwaukee where the Black community faced high unemployment, unequal housing, and segregated schools. An ongoing challenge was instigated for Lerman about redefining an artist's role to include questions concerning subject matter, financial sustenance, and pursuing deeper relationships with audiences.

Lerman graduated high school early and worked a clerical job before pursuing higher education. From 1965 to 1967, she attended Bennington College, where she studied under Martha Wittman, who later became a member of the Dance Exchange. From 1967 to 1968, she attended Brandeis University in Waltham, MA. Lerman then transferred to University of Maryland where she earned a BA in Dance in 1970. Upon graduation, she worked at the Sandy Spring Friends Schools in Sandy Spring, Maryland as a history teacher and strengthened their dance program. After one semester, Lerman shifted to teaching dance full-time after making dance an essential part of the school's curriculum and culture until she left in 1973.

Lerman eventually earned a MFA in Dance from George Washington University in 1982. She trained in dance with Ethel Butler, Meriem Rosen, Viola Farber, Peter Saul, Jan Van Dyke, Maida Withers, Twyla Tharp, Florence West, Martha Wittman, Don Redlich; mime with Jan Kessler; and theatre with Robert Prosky. Lerman considers most of her education to have occurred in rehearsal halls, community gatherings, and interactions with her peers.

== Personal life ==
Lerman lives in Tempe, Arizona with her husband Jon Spelman, and dogs Willie and Rosie. Their daughter Anna Clare Spelman, is a documentary filmmaker who lives in Turkey with her husband Peter Prix. Family is a big influence in Lerman's life. She grew up with two brothers. Her older brother, Richard, was an internationally renowned experimental sound and installation artist and educator who taught at Arizona State University for many years. Her younger brother, David, since deceased, was an assistant district attorney in Milwaukee where he instituted restorative justice practices within legal and educational systems.

== Career ==
=== 1970s ===
Although Lerman dabbled in choreography in high school and college, she considers her choreographic career to begin with the solo piece called New York City Winter (1974) about her nine months living in the East Village and working as a go-go dancer to fund her technique classes.

When her mother died from cancer in 1975, Lerman entered an emotional period of loss and reflection. She wanted to harness her family's experience into a dance so she sought out the presence of older dancers needed to fulfill the dream imagery she had lived with while her mother was dying. Lerman's search led her to the Roosevelt Hotel for Senior Citizens where she taught a unique technique class based on how she understood dance at the time. The class met once a week and between 30 and 80 residents would attend. Inspired and necessitated by her mother's death, Lerman choreographed Women of the Clear Vision (1975), her first piece that included older dancers. The piece honored her mother's life and death, where Lerman performed as both mother and daughter.

As Lerman continued her work at the Roosevelt Hotel for Senior Citizens and teaching at George Washington University, she learned that her potential to apply for resources to support her work would be greater if she led an organization. In 1976, Lerman founded the Liz Lerman Dance Exchange where she embraced cross-generational, cross-racial, and cross-class work.

=== 1980s ===
While leading the Dance Exchange, Lerman pursued making dances that explored critical social topics such as Docudance: Reaganomics (No One Knows What the Numbers Mean) (1982) and Docudance: Nine Short Dances About the Defense Budget and Other Military Matters (1983) which quickly gained media recognition. She began to weave together personal narratives, historical facts, and data-driven information into her choreographic storytelling.

Her decade-long work with the elders at Roosevelt Hotel was curated into her first book, Teaching Dance to Senior Citizens (1984), as a practical, step-by-step guide. In 1986, Lerman was commissioned by Dancing in the Streets to commemorate the Statue of Liberty centennial celebration, which became the iconic piece Still Crossing (1986). Lerman continued to choreograph timely pieces such as Pavane for Two Older Women (1983), E.Hopper (1984), Russia: Footnotes to a History (1986), and Atomic Priests (1987). The Dance Exchange emerged as a model company that could balance touring concert and community-based work, and maintain an environment at home for workshops and special classes.

=== 1990s ===
Well into her choreographic career with the Dance Exchange in the early 1990s, Lerman decided to channel her frustration with the careless habits surrounding criticism into a new feedback ritual. Lerman experimented with systems of peer response grounded in inquiry, honesty, supportive critique, and addressing the problems of hierarchy. After testing in various settings such as the American Dance Festival, Colorado Dance Festival, and Alternate ROOTS, Lerman articulated the now renowned formal system of The Critical Response Process.

Notable dance pieces from Lerman's career in the 90s included The Good Jew? (1991) where Lerman put herself on trial to question whether she was Jewish enough. Safe House: Still Looking (1994) was made in response to requests from the city residents of Wilmington, Delaware to recognize their history in the underground railroad. The piece also made it possible for the community to extend questions of race and culture into the present day. Shehechianu: Faith and Science on the Midway (1995), Shehechianu: Bench Marks (1996), and Shehechianu: Skin Soliloquies (1997) were inspired by the question of how histories affect the present and used the Jewish prayer Shehecheyanu as a balm. Lerman loosely translates the prayer as "Isn't it amazing that, given all our different histories, we're gathered together in this moment?" The three pieces drew from the company members' personal experiences to illustrate the joys and challenges of coexisting and questioned how to move forward with respect for the past.

The Music Hall's Shipyard Project (1996) culminated an eighteen month residency with the community to process the downsizing and efforts to close the Portsmouth Naval Shipyard in Portsmouth, New Hampshire. Lerman and the company collaborated with shipyard workers, civilian and military personnel, youth, and retired shipyard professionals to develop pieces that interpreted their experiences with the shipyard. The project culminated in a one week festival where the company and residents performed twice a day, once on the shipyard ground and once somewhere in the community.

Lerman premiered Fifty Modest Reflections on Turning Fifty in 1998 which crossed her personal milestone with the 50th anniversary of the creation of the state of Israel. Lerman interviewed her father, just before his death in 1999, and his voice and stories are interspersed throughout the piece. White Gloves/Hard Hats (1998) and Pas de Dirt (1998) premiered the iconic duet between bulldozers and ballerinas. Lerman finished off her career in the 90s with early explorations of what would become The Hallelujah Project.

=== 2000s ===
From 1998 until 2002 for The Hallelujah Project, Liz Lerman and the Dance Exchange traveled across fifteen cities and worked with over 1000 community members in search of the daily moments of praise and celebration. Fifteen unique projects were created ranging from In Praise of Ordinary Prophets (2000) in Arizona to In Praise of Paradise Lost and Found (2001) in Michigan.

In 2002, Lerman was awarded the MacArthur Foundation's "Genius" Grant showcasing the power of dance to harness lived experience as a means of connection across generations and communities. With the support of her long-time collaborator, John Borstel, Lerman published Liz Lerman's Critical Response Process: A Method for Getting Useful Feedback on Anything You Make, from Dance to Dessert (2003). The step-by-step guide formally introduced the Critical Response Process as a method for giving and getting feedback on creative work in progress, designed to leave the maker eager and motivated to get back to work.

Lerman was commissioned by the Harvard Law School to develop a performance for a conference marking the 60th anniversary of the Nuremberg Trials. Small Dances About Big Ideas (2005) boldly tackled topics of genocide and international law. Martha Minow, the dean of the Harvard Law School at the time, was pivotal to the research and encouraged a portion of the performance to be interactive with the audience. Audience's stories and movement were incorporated in the memorable final scene where performers petitioned the judge using current events from that day in the International Criminal Court.

Dedicated to using dance for public understanding of complex topics, Lerman developed Ferocious Beauty: Genome (2006) in collaboration with scientists from institutions such as the National Institutes of Health, Howard University, and Wesleyan University, where the piece premiered. Lerman artistically showcased the awe and rigor of genetic research and provided audiences with fundamental knowledge around developmental biology. A popular work which toured for more than five years, Ferocious Beauty, was the first of a trilogy of science/art work where video projections were intrinsic to performance.

=== 2010s ===
Emboldened by her collaborations with the scientific community, Lerman developed The Matter of Origins (2010), addressing the physics and philosophy of beginnings and the workings of matter at quantum and cosmic scales. Following a stage performance that constituted Act One, audiences moved to a nearby venue for an Act Two "Tea," which served up cake and conversation, as dance was performed among the tables and on newly minted iPads. Throughout the research process, Lerman repeatedly took a team to the European Organization for Nuclear Research (CERN), where dancers were filmed in the Hadron Collider just before the system was activated. The National Science Foundation funded a small project which allowed the performance company to carry out research with audiences as the piece progressed.

After thirty five years as the Founding Artistic Director of the Liz Lerman Dance Exchange, Lerman stepped down from leading the non-profit dance company. The successful transition was carried out over several years making it possible for the organization to continue under new leadership while Lerman entered a new era working as an independent artist.

Lerman gathered the wisdom gained from her unorthodox choreographic experiences up to that point into a collection of essays titled Hiking the Horizontal (2011) published by Wesleyan University Press. Using dance as a vehicle for human insight and understanding of the world, Lerman offered the book as a gentle manifesto to bring a horizontal focus to bear on a hierarchical world.

Blood, Muscle, Bone (2013), a collaboration with Jawole Willa Jo Zollar and Urban Bush Women, was Lerman's first post-Dance Exchange piece. Public sharings of Blood, Muscle, Bone included stage performances, prayer breakfasts, workshops, panels, and cabarets that critically questioned how wealth and poverty are defined, imagined, and impact the body.

Lerman went on to choreograph Healing Wars (2014), a multimedia performance utilizing the American Civil War to reflect on conflicts to the present day. Healing Wars featured an ensemble of dancers including a Navy veteran with a prosthetic leg and actors such as award-winning Bill Pullman. Healing Wars toured in through the good auspices of university dance presenters and in two major regional theatres, Arena Stage and La Jolla Playhouse, where the piece had a one month run, 7 performances a week, which is unusual in the Dance field. A highlight of Healing Wars was the live gallery installation prologue, in which each performer moved about their uniquely set room, complete with objects and natural materials, such as trees and dirt. The audience wandered through these backstage rooms before they took their formal seats. One way Lerman thought about this experience was as an "animated program note", a window into each character's lives, physical conditions, and environments.

In 2016, Lerman accepted her first full-time faculty position at Arizona State University's Herberger Institute for Design and the Arts and was named the first of the Institute Professors. The community at Arizona State University (ASU) was thrilled to welcome Lerman to support their investigation of an artist's role in society, preparation of artists as partners in innovation, and supporting Lerman's quest to create a digital space for creative tools.

In 2017, Lerman was honored with both the Jacob's Pillow Dance Award and the American Dance Festival's Balasaraswati/Joy Anne Dewey Beinecke Endowed Chair for Distinguished Teaching Award.

=== 2020s ===
Lerman committed to creating a piece about witches after visiting an art exhibition in 2013 at the Scottish National Gallery entitled Witches and Wicked Bodies, which covered 500 years of drawings of witches by Western illustrators. Throughout the pandemic, Lerman and her team used virtual platforms to continue creatively working the piece. After a decade of research and development, Lerman premiered Wicked Bodies (2022) which showcased invisible ways feminine and embodied knowing have been celebrated, erased, and criminalized. Wicked Bodies was presented by Sonoma State University, ASU Gammage, Jacob's Pillow, and Yerba Buena Center for the Arts.

With the Critical Response Process (CRP) being utilized by diverse practitioners across the world for nearly three decades, Lerman and co-author John Borstel published Critique is Creative (2022). In the book, Lerman and Borstel deepened the understanding and practicality of the process. Additionally, 21 CRP practitioners contributed essays on the applications and variations of CRP in diverse fields such as education, congregations, and community life.

Following a three-year senior fellowship at the Yerba Buena Center for the Arts in San Francisco, California, Liz Lerman and Brett Cook shared the interactive exhibition Reflection & Action which was open to the public from October 2022 to April 2023.

In 2023, Lerman was awarded a Guggenheim Fellowship. Lerman has often quipped that she wrote her autobiography by filling out the personal narrative portion of the Guggenheim application twenty seven times. The grant came at an opportune time to afford Lerman a sabbatical, which closed with a residency at the Rockefeller Foundation Bellagio Center, where she worked on her new book. Lerman was also honored with the 2024 Dance Magazine award where she reflected on the critical role of the body for our species' survival.

Lerman's current projects include building the Atlas of Creative Tools, an online resource and archive, and Legacy Unboxed^{.} Legacy Unboxed supports a collaboration with groundbreaking artists and extraordinary choreographers, Eiko Otake, Jawole Willa Jo Zollar, Joanna Haigood, and Merián Soto. Legacy Unboxed has several investigative avenues, including the preparation of each artist's archives, efforts to influence how embodied knowledge is categorized, and a series of site-specific research performance events called My Body is a Library. Lerman's upcoming book with a working title of A World in Constant Motion: An Insomniac's Guide through Shape and Momentum is a collection of personal essays set to be published by Wesleyan University Press in 2026. Liz continues to evolve the Critical Response Process through the annual certification program and a fundamentals course.

== The Atlas of Creative Tools ==
The Atlas of Creative Tools is Liz Lerman's lifelong goal to collect experiential tools that she has developed from decades of choreographic and community practice. Beyond dance applications, these tools are in use by theater makers, visual artists, rabbis, youth workers, experimental physicists, dialogue facilitators, molecular biologists, social workers, orchestra musicians, and writing teachers. Current variations of the Atlas of Creative Tools include a course taught at Arizona State University and a partnership with the Principled Innovation program.

Lerman and her team continue to work on an online interface for the Atlas of Creative Tools in order to create a better, more interesting realm of learning and discovery. Future goals for "The Atlas" include a platform that is spacious enough to host numerous 'neighborhoods' of other artists' creative tools to supplement Lerman's original toolbox. Users will be able to interact with dozens of tools, and receive instruction in their use as they desire. Resources will include creative techniques, origin stories, essays with adjacent theories, examples of their applications, and an extensive glossary.

== The Critical Response Process ==
Developed by Liz Lerman in the early 1990s, the Critical Response Process (CRP) is a method for giving and receiving feedback on works in progress, designed to leave the maker eager and motivated to get back to work. Lerman has co-authored two books about CRP, Liz Lerman's Critical Response Process: A Method for Getting Useful Feedback on Anything You Make, from Dance to Dessert (2003), published by the Dance Exchange, and Critique Is Creative: The Critical Response Process in Theory and Action (2022), published by Wesleyan University Press.

Through the formal structure of its four core steps, Critical Response Process harnesses curiosity and consent to offer makers an active role in the critique of their own work. The Liz Lerman LLC offers a yearly certification program to become a trained CRP facilitator, currently led by Phil Stoesz and Sumana Mandala, and an 8-week fundamentals program to build expertise through communal practice. CRP is actively used by various organizations including Jacob's Pillow, the Innovative Conservatoire, the Federation of Scottish Theatres, the Guildhall School of Music and Drama, Yorkshire Dance, the Yale School of Drama, and New York Theatre Workshop.

== Honors and awards ==
- 2024 Dance Magazine Award
- 2024 Rockefeller Ford Foundation Bellagio Center Residency
- 2023 Guggenheim Fellowship Award
- 2021 Honorary Doctorate from University of Gothenburg
- 2019 –2023 Senior Fellow at Yerba Buena Center for the Arts
- 2017 Jacob's Pillow Dance Award
- 2017 American Dance Festival Balasaraswati/Joy Anne Dewey Beinecke Endowed Chair for Distinguished Teaching Award
- 2017 CultureSummit Artist-in-Residence
- 2015 American Dance Guild Lifetime Achievement Award
- 2015 Honorary Degree from Cornish College of the Arts, Seattle, Washington
- 2014 Dance/USA Honor Award
- 2011 United States Artists Ford Foundation Fellow
- 2011 Otto René Castillo Award for Political Theatre
- 2011 Montgomery County Executive's Lifetime Impact Award
- 2009 Blaney Award for Dialogue, Simon Fraser University, Vancouver, BC
- 2006 Honorary Doctorate of Fine Arts, Williams College, Williamstown, MA
- 2005 Inductee, University of Maryland Alumni Hall of Fame
- 2004 NFJC, Jewish Cultural Achievement Awards for Performing Arts
- 2002 The MacArthur Fellowship
- 2002 Forward Fifty
- 1997 Cultural Alliance of Greater Washington Founders Award
- 1995 The American Jewish Congress "Golda" Award
- 1995 First Annual Pola Nirenska Award
- 1993 Washington's 25 Most Talented People, Washingtonian Magazine
- 1989 American Choreographer Award, National Corporate Fund for Dance
- 1988 Washingtonian of the Year Award, Washingtonian Magazine
- 1988 Mayor's Art Award, Washington, DC

== List of Choreographic Works ==
Wicked Bodies (2022)

- Green Music Center, Sonoma State University – Sonoma, CA (April 2022)
- Jacob's Pillow Dance Festival – Becket, MA (August 2022)
- Gammage Auditorium, Arizona State University – Tempe, AZ (September 2022)
- Yerba Buena Center for the Arts – San Francisco, CA (October 2022)

Healing Wars (2014)

- Arena Stage – Washington, D.C. (June 2014)
- Peak Performances, Montclair State University – Montclair, NJ (September 2014)
- Hancher Auditorium, University of Iowa – Iowa City, IA (November 2014)
- Moss Arts Center, Virginia Tech – Blacksburg, VA (March 2015)
- La Jolla Playhouse – San Diego, CA (October 2015)
- R&R Arts Festival – Tampa, FL (February 2017)
- Herberger Institute for Design and the Arts - Tempe, AZ (November 2021)

Appalachian Spring (2014) collaboration with Jim Ross, associate choreography by Vincent Thomas

- Clarice Smith Performing Arts Center – College Park, MD (May 2014)

Blood, Muscle, Bone (2013) collaboration with Jawole Willar Jo Zollar & Urban Bush Women

- Baltimore's Center Stage – Baltimore, MD
- Florida State University – Tallahassee, FL
- Marlene Meyerson Jewish Community Center of Manhattan – New York, NY (April 2013)
- Harlem Stage – New York, NY (October 2013)
- Wesleyan University – Middletown, CT (November 2013)

A Civil War Christmas (2013) choreography for a play by Paula Vogel, associate choreography by Paloma McGregor

- Center Stage – Baltimore, MD (December 2013)

Afternoon of a Faun (2012) collaboration with Jim Ross – Clarice Smith Performing Arts Center – College Park, MD

Minds on the Move: The Treadmill Tapes (2011)

- Harvard University – Cambridge, MA (October 2011)
- Wesleyan University – Middletown, CT (May 2012)
- ASU Museum, Nelson Fine Arts Center – Tempe, AZ (January 2017)

The Matter of Origins (2010)

- Clarice Smith Performing Arts Center, College Park, MD (September 2010)
- Alexander Kasser Theater, Montclair State University – Montclair, NJ (March 2011)
- Gammage Auditorium, Arizona State University – Tempe, AZ (April 2011)
- Museum of Contemporary Art Chicago – Chicago, IL (November 2011)

garage/dances (2010) – Colonial Parking Garage – Washington, D.C.

Darwin's Wife (2009) – Center for Education and Culture – Sapporo, Japan

Yuki No Kioku 雪の記憶 [Memory of Snow] (2009) – Dance Life Festival 2008 – Sapporo, Japan

Seven Songs (2007) – Yamaguchi Center for Arts and Media – Yamaguchi, Japan

613 Radical Acts of Prayer (2007) collaboration with Cassie Meador – New Jersey Performing Arts Center – Newark, NJ

- NJPAC Global Exchange Program – Kyoto, Japan (March 2007)
- Brown University Festival of Dance – Providence, RI (May 2008)
- International Festival of Arts & Ideas – New Haven, CT (June 2008)

Man/Chair Dances (2006)

- Omaha Symphony Orchestra, Holland Performing Arts Center – Omaha, NE (February 2006)
- Clarice Smith Performing Arts Center – College Park, MD (November 2006)

Ferocious Beauty: Genome (2006)

- Wesleyan University – Middletown, CT (February 2006)
- Yerba Buena Center for the Arts – San Francisco, CA (April 2006)
- Duke University – Durham, NC (September 2006)
- Chicago Museum of Contemporary Arts –Chicago, IL (September 2006)
- Mayo Clinic Convention Center – Mankato, MN (November 2006)
- Atlas Performing Arts Center – Washington, D.C. (April 2007)
- Harbourfront Centre – Toronto, Canada (September 2007)
- Gammage Auditorium, Arizona State University – Tempe, AZ (October 2007)
- Alexander Kasser Theater, Montclair State University – Montclair, NJ (April 2008)
- Williams Center for the Arts, Lafayette College – Easton, PA (November 2008)
- Indiana University Auditorium – Bloomington, IN (February 2009)
- Lied Center of Kansas – Lawrence, KS (November 2009)

Small Dances About Big Ideas (2005) – Harvard Law School – Cambridge, MA

- Alys Stephens Center, University of Alabama at Birmingham – Birmingham, AL (November 2005)
- Choreographer's Commentary Version: Dance New Amsterdam – New York, NY (October 2006)
- Clarice Smith Performing Arts Center, College Park, MD (November 2006)
- International Festival of Arts & Ideas – New Haven, CT (June 2008)
- Kanbar Hall, Jewish Community Center – San Francisco, CA (April 2009)

Creation as Daily Act: Jewish Identity in the 21st Century (2004) – Kresge Auditorium – Stanford University – Stanford, CA

Corpus (2004) collaboration with Ann Hamilton – MASS MoCA – North Adams, MA

Oh, Brad! (2003) - Hirshhorn Museum and Sculpture Garden - Washington, D.C.

The Mad Dancers (2003) play: Yehuda Hyman, co-choreographer: Nick Olcott – Goldman Theatre, JCC – Washington, D.C.

Dancers at a Cocktail Party (2002) – Tampa Bay Performing Arts Center, FL

Uneasy Dances (2002) – Tampa Bay Performing Arts Center – Tampa, FL

Hard Work (2001) – Skirball Cultural Center – Los Angeles, CA

The Hallelujah Project (1998 – 2002) Across 15+ communities

Hallelujah/USA (August 2002) – Clarice Smith Performing Arts Center – College Park, MD

Hallelujah: Between a Whisper and a Song (June 2002) – City Arts – Greensboro, NC

Hallelujah: In Praise of Peaks and Valleys (April 2002) – Appalachian State University – Boone, NC

Hallelujah: In Praise of Spirit and Stone (April 2002) – Diana Wortham Theater – Asheville, NC

Hallelujah: In Praise of Paradise Lost and Found (October 2001) – Power Center for the Performing Arts – Ann Arbor/Detroit, MI

Hallelujah: In Praise of the Creative Spirit (August 2001) – Bates Dance Festival – Lewiston, ME

Hallelujah: In Praise of Beauty and Disorder (June 2001) – Walker Arts Center – Minneapolis, MN

Hallelujah: Walking Between Worlds (May 2001) – Haystack Mountain School of Crafts – Deer Isle, ME

Hallelujah: In Praise of Family Legends (April 2001) – Society for the Performing Arts – Houston, TX

Hallelujah: In Praise of Constancy in the Midst of Change (March 2001) – Flynn Center for the Performing Arts – Burlington, VT

Hallelujah: Stones Will Float, Leaves Will Sink, Paths Will Cross (February 2001) – Skirball Cultural Center – Los Angeles, CA

Hallelujah: In Praise of Fertile Fields (August 2000) collaboration with Martha Wittman – Jacob's Pillow – Becket, MA

- Bates Dance Festival – Lewiston, ME (August 2001)

Hallelujah: In Praise of Ordinary Prophets (March 2000) collaboration with Peter DiMuro – University of Arizona – Tucson, AZ

Hallelujah: First Light (January 2000) – The Dock – Eastport, ME

Hallelujah: In Praise of Animals and Their People (March 1999) – George Washington University – Washington, D.C.

- Stewart Theatre, North Carolina State University – Raleigh, NC (April 2002)

Hallelujah: Gates of Praise (March 1999) – Lisner Auditorium, George Washington University – Washington, D.C.

- Goodhart Hall, Bryn Mawr College – Bryn Mawr, PA (October 1999)
- Skirball Cultural Center – Los Angeles, CA (February 2001)

Moving to Hallelujah (May 1998) – Skirball Cultural Center – Los Angeles, CA

Getting to Hallelujah (April 1998) – Garde Arts Center – New London, CT

Home is Where the Art Is (1999) – Takoma Park, MD

White Gloves/Hard Hats (1998) – Garde Arts Center – New London, CT

Pas de Dirt (1998) – Garde Arts Center – New London, CT

- National Building Museum – Washington, D.C. (May 2007)

Fifty Modest Reflections on Turning Fifty (1998) – Gammage Auditorium, Arizona State University – Tempe, AZ

Let's Get Started (1998)

- Lisner Auditorium, George Washington University – Washington, D.C. (March 1999)
- Goodhart Hall, Bryn Mawr College – Bryn Mawr, PA (October 1999)
- Skirball Cultural Center – Los Angeles, CA (February 2001)

Shehechianu: Skin Soliloquies (1997) – Lansburgh Theatre – Washington, D.C.

Fresh Blood (1996) – Queens Theatre in the Park – New York, NY

- Lansburgh Theatre – Washington, D.C.
- Goodhart Hall, Bryn Mawr College – Bryn Mawr, PA (October 1999)

Light Years (1996) – Intelsat Headquarters – Washington, D.C.

Nocturnes (1996) – Lisner Auditorium, George Washington University – Washington, D.C.

- Davis Performing Arts Center, Georgetown University — Washington, D.C. (February 2008)

Shehechianu: Bench Marks (1996) – Lisner Auditorium, George Washington University – Washington, D.C.

The Music Hall's Shipyard Project (1996) – Music Hall/Portsmouth Naval Shipyard – Portsmouth, NH/Kittery, ME

Sustenance Dance (1996) collaboration with Michelle Pearson – Mayfair Festival of the Arts – Allentown, PA

Portsmouth Pages (1995) – Music Hall – Portsmouth, NH

Room for Many More (1995) collaboration with Kimberli Boyd – Chicago Historical Society – Chicago, IL

Shehechianu: Faith and Science on the Midway (1995) – Lansburgh Theatre – Washington, D.C.

- Columbia College Dance Center – Chicago, IL
- Flynn Center for the Performing Arts – Burlington, VT

Flying Into the Middle (1995) – Joyce Theater – New York, NY

Safe House: Still Looking (1994)

- Lansburgh Theatre – Washington, D.C. (June 1995)
- site-specific – Friends Meeting House – Wilmington, DE
- theatrical version – Cowell Theater – San Francisco, CA

CHAMMP Dance Celebration (1994) – Meridian Hill Park, Washington, D.C.

Spelunking the Center (1993) collaboration with Tom Truss – Kennedy Center for the Performing Arts, Washington, D.C.

This is Who We Are (1993) – Marvin Center, George Washington University – Washington, D.C.

Incidents in the Life of an Ohio Youth (1993) – BalletMet – Columbus, OH

The Awakening (1992) collaboration with Kimberli Boyd – McKinley High School – Washington, D.C.

Untitled Site Specific Work (1991) Kennedy Center for the Performing Arts – Washington, D.C.

The Good Jew? (1991) – Israeli/Jewish American Dance Festival – Boston, MA

Untitled (1991) – Meredith College – Raleigh, NC

Short Stories, version II (1991) – American Dance Festival – Durham, NC

Short Stories, version I (1991) – The Barns at Wolf Trap – Vienna, VA

Anatomy of an Inside Story (1990) – Dance Place – Washington, D.C.

A Life in the Nation's Capital (1990) – Dance Place – Washington, D.C.

The Perfect Ten – Serious Fun! (1990) – Lincoln Center – New York, NY

Docudance 1990: Dark Interlude (1990) – 14th Street Dancenter – New York, NY

May I Have Your Attention Please! (1990) – Union Station – Washington, D.C.

Five Days in Maine (1989) – Maine Festival – Portland, ME

Floating Hand (1989) – Dance Place – Washington, D.C.

Reenactments (1989) – Kennedy Center for the Performing Arts – Washington, D.C.

Ms. Appropriate Goes to the Theatre (1988) – Dance Place – Washington, D.C.

Atomic Priests: The Feature (1987) – Dance Theater Workshop – New York, NY

Sketches from Memory (1987) – DAMA Theater – Washington, D.C.

Atomic Priests: Coming Attractions (1987) – DAMA Theater – Washington, D.C.

Black Sea Follies (1986) director: Stanley Silverman; writer: Paul Schmidt – Lenox Arts Center – Lenox, MA

Still Crossing (1986) – Liberty Dances in Battery Park – New York, NY

- Lisner Auditorium, George Washington University – Washington, D.C. (May 1996)
- We Are Still Crossing: CenterStage, Reston Community Center – Reston, VA (May 2007)

Russia: Footnotes to a History (1986) – Museum of Contemporary Art – Los Angeles, CA

Russia: The Transparent Apple and the Silver Saucer (1985) – Sidwell Auditorium – Washington, D.C.

Space Cadet (1984) – Washington Project for the Arts – Washington, D.C.

Ives & Company (1984) – National Portrait Gallery – Washington, D.C.

E. Hopper (1984) – Dance Place – Washington, D.C.

- Caplin Theatre – Sidwell Friends School -- (January 1984)

Second Variation on a Window (1984) – Dance Place – Washington, D.C.

Video Arcane (1983) – Marvin Theater, George Washington University – Washington, D.C.

Pavane for Two Older Women (1983) – New Music America/Old Post Office Pavilion – Washington, D.C.

Variations on a Window (1983) – New Music America/Old Post Office Pavilion – Washington, D.C.

Docudance: Nine Short Dances About the Defense Budget and Other Military Matters (1983) – Marvin Center, George Washington University – Washington, D.C.

Songs and Poems of the Body: In the Text (1982) – Dance Place – Washington, D.C.

Swan Lake (1982)

- toured at over 100 schools in the DMV area

Docudance: Reaganomics (No One Knows What the Numbers Mean) (1982) – Dance Place – Washington, D.C.

Songs and Poems of the Body: In the Gallery (1981) – Kennedy Center for the Performing Arts – Washington, D.C.

Current Events (1981) – Dance Place – Washington, D.C.

May Dance on the Mall (1980) – City Dance Festival, Lincoln Memorial – Washington, D.C.

Journey 1-4 (1980) – Washington Project for the Arts – Washington, D.C.

- duet-variation of Journey performed by Thomas Dwyer and Benjamin Wegman (2010)

Fanfare for the Common Man (1980) – City Dance/National Mall – Washington, D.C.

Pollution Dances (1979) – McPherson Square – Washington, D.C.

Who's on First? (1979) – City Dance/Warner Theater – Washington, D.C.

RSVP (1979) – O'Neill Choreographers' Conference – Waterford, CT

Bonsai (1978) – National Arboretum – Washington, D.C.

Goodbye Wisconsin (1978) – Dance Exchange – Washington, D.C.

Still Life with Cat and Fingers (1978) – Dance Exchange – Washington, D.C.

Elevator Operators and Other Strangers (1978) – Dance Exchange – Washington, D.C.

Ms. Galaxy and Her Three Raps with God (1977) – Baltimore Theatre Project – Baltimore, MD

Memory Gardens (1976) – Washington Project for the Arts – Washington, D.C.

Woman of the Clear Vision (1975) – Hand Chapel, Mount Vernon College, Washington, D.C.

Approaching Someone (1974) choreography for play by Megan Terry – Washington Area Feminist Theater – Washington, D.C.

New York City Winter (1974) – St. Mark's Danspace – New York, NY Time Games (1971) collaboration with students – Sandy Spring Friends School – Sandy Spring, MD

== Publications ==
- Lerman, L. & Minow, M. (2025). Turning Controversy into Connection. In I. Kacandes (Ed.), Humanities for Humans: Clear Thinking on Challenging Issues (pp. 119–140). Berlin, Boston: De Gruyter. https://doi.org/10.1515/9783111531489-009
- Lerman, L. (2024). Creativity is Our Birthright. In J.A. Skloot & L.J. Grushcow (Eds.), Communities of Meaning: Conversations on Modern Jewish Life Inspired by Rabbi Larry Hoffman (pp. 16–20). Behrman House, Inc.
- Lerman, L. (2023). Foreword. In A. Orr, Dance Works: Stories of Creative Collaboration. (pp. vii-x). Wesleyan University Press.
- Lerman, L., Borstel, J. (2022). Critique Is Creative: The Critical Response Process in Theory and Action. Wesleyan University Press.
- Lerman, L. (2022). Foreword. In P. Musil, D. Risner, K Schupp (Eds.), Dancing across the lifespan: Negotiating age, place, and purpose. (pp. v-vii). Springer Nature.
- Lerman, L. (2022). Preface. In NM. Jackson, R. Pappas, T. Shapiro-Phim (Eds.), The Oxford Handbook of Jewishness and Dance. (pp. xi-xii). Oxford University Press.
- Lerman, L. (2021). Living with Witches During a Pandemic: Fragments from the Journey of Wicked Bodies. Imagining: A Gibney Journal (7) Gibney Company Community Center.
- Lerman, L. (2018). Dramaturgy as litany. In R. Bowditch, J. Casazza, & A. Thornton (Eds.), Physical Dramaturgy (pp. 72–78). Routledge.
- Grabel, L., Weir, M., Appel, L. F., Johnson, E., McCarthy, R., & Lerman, L. (2013). Science choreography: a movement-based approach to biology teaching. CBE: Life Sciences Education, 12(4), 582-583.
- Lerman, L. (2014). Values for dance making and methods for critique. Choreographic Practices, 5(1), 33-38.
- Lerman, L. (2011). Hiking the Horizontal: Field Notes from a Choreographer. United States: Wesleyan University Press.
- Lerman, L. (2011). The Genome Dances. Science, 331(6020), 1027-1027.
- Science Choreography. (2011). A Collaboration of the Wesleyan Hughes Program of Life Sciences and the Liz Lerman Dance Exchange. http://sciencechoreography.wesleyan.edu/
- D|Lab. Dance Exchange Toolbox. (2011). Virtual Commons for Choreography and Collaboration. http://www.d-lab.org/
- Lerman, L. and Kosaka, H. (2011). On the Veranda: Approach and Observation. Leveraging Investments in Creativity Publication.
- Lerman, L. (2010). Trembling with Angels: The Power of Rehearsal. In L.A. Hoffman (Ed.)Who by Fire, who by Water--Un'taneh Tokef (Vol. 1). Jewish Lights Publishing.
- Lerman, L. (2009). Dancing on the Holiest Day. Sh'ma 40(662), 13-15.
- Lerman, L. (2005). Dance Fever. [Review of the book Tango: The Art History of Love by R.F. Thompson].Washington Post Book Word.
- Lerman, L. (2004). Bodies of Faith: Feeling the Spirit in the Art of Dance. Faith and Form: The Interfaith Journal on Religion, Art & Architecture, 37(3),15-17.
- Lerman, L., Borstel, J. (2003). Liz Lerman's Critical Response Process: A Method for Getting Useful Feedback on Anything You Make, from Dance to Dessert. United States: Liz Lerman Dance Exchange.
- Lerman, L. (2002). Art in Community: Feeding the Artist, Feeding the Art. In D. Adams & A. Goldbard (Eds.), Community, culture and globalization. Rockefeller Foundation, Creativity & Culture Division.
- Lerman, L. (1996). Welcoming the Artist into Jewish Life. Reconstructionism Today, Fall Issue 1996.
- Lerman, L. (1995). Are Miracles Enough?: Selected Writings on Art and Community 1983-1994, Liz Lerman Dance Exchange.
- Lerman, L. (1994). The Jew, the Madonna, and the Meaning of Art. New Menorah, Fall 1994.
- Lerman, L. (1994). By All Possible Means. Movement Research, Issue #9.
- Lerman, L. (1993). Toward a Process for Critical Response. Alternate Roots, Fall 1993.
- Lerman, L. (1984). Teaching Dance to Senior Adults. United States: C. Thomas.
- Lerman, L. (1983). Dancers of the Third Age. Collage, 2(2). The National Council on the Aging. Cultural Enrichment and Older Adults.
