= John Hemphill =

John Hemphill may refer to:

- John A. Hemphill (1927-2021), United States Army general
- John Hemphill (actor) (born 1953), Canadian comic actor, writer, and producer
- John Hemphill (Texas politician) (1803–1862), American politician and judge
- John J. Hemphill (1849–1912), American politician from South Carolina
- John M. Hemphill (1892-1957), American politician from Pennsylvania
