= Herbert St Maur Carter =

Irish-born British military officer, doctor and surgeon (1878–1957)

Lieutenant Colonel Herbert St Maur Carter DSO (7 May 1878 – 10 February 1957) was an Irish-born British military officer, doctor and surgeon, who served with the Royal Army Medical Corps and the British Red Cross. He was decorated by both the British and Serbian governments and Mentioned in Dispatches three times.

He was born in Ireland, the son of Major Edward Augustus Carter, 1st Battalion of the Sherwood Foresters, and the Hon Mary Hannah Augusta Hemphill of Clifton House, Dublin, daughter of Charles Hemphill, 1st Baron Hemphill.

St Maur Carter was initially educated at Framlingham College, Suffolk, he then studied medicine and surgery at Trinity College, Dublin where he qualified M.B., B.Ch. with honours in 1904, and proceeded to MD the same year. After qualifying he took up a position as house-surgeon at the Adelaide Hospital, Dublin, However, after passing his army surgical/medical entry exams he took a regular army commission with the Royal Army Medical Corps on 30 April 1904, serving as a lieutenant on probation and being confirmed in the rank the following year on 2 July 1905.

On 1 September 1904 he had his paper, "A Steriliser for Infected Discharges" published in the Dublin Journal of Medical Science.

On 1 July 1905, St Maur Carter was seconded to the Adelaide Hospital in Dublin.

Between 1906 and 1910 he served in Malta as a general surgeon, although between March 1907 and June 1908 he was deployed as a surgeon to the Island of Crete, being promoted to captain on 30 January 1908.

In 1912, St Maur Carter served with the British Red Cross Commission in Serbia as an R.A.M.C. surgeon captain, commanding one of twelve Red Cross units during the First Balkan War. He then returned in 1913 as the British Red Cross commissioner to Serbian forces until December 1913, and for his distinguished service during these operations he was made a Commander of the Serbian Order of St Sava by the King of Serbia.

On 19 August 1914, St Maur Carter first entered the Theatre of War in France and Flanders with 5 Field Ambulance R.A.M.C., which was attached to the Second Division of the British Expeditionary Force, and was part of General Sir Douglas Haig's I Corps.

On 17 February 1915 (London Gazette), he was mentioned by Field Marshal Sir John French in his dispatch dated 20 November 1914, for the actions at Ypres and Armentieres.

On 22 June 1915 (London Gazette) he was again mentioned in dispatches by Field Marshal Sir John French, this time in his dispatch dated 5 April 1915 for Neurve Chapelle.

On 23 June 1915, St Maur Carter was created a Companion of the Distinguished Service Order: "For distinguished service in the field".

On 1 July 1915 he was promoted to major, and was immediately promoted again to temporary lieutenant-colonel and placed in command of 5 Field Ambulance, R.A.M.C..

On 29 May 1917 (London Gazette) he was again mentioned in dispatches, this time by Field Marshal Sir Douglas Haig in his dispatch dated 9 April 1917.

On 10 November 1917 St Maur Carter was sent to the Italian Front and was attached to XIV Corps H.Q., which was based at Mantua, South of Milan, although with the Italian crisis over he returned to Western Front again, where he remained until the end of the war. After the war in 1918 he was sent to India and was based at Army H.Q., where he helped co-ordinate the British and Indian Medical Services employed during the Third Afghan War. He then returned to the UK in 1923 and took up a position with Aldershot Command again as a senior specialist surgeon.

On 27 January 1928, he was promoted to lieutenant colonel and was posted to Germany, serving with the British Army of the Rhine (BOAR)). He also married Cecily Verena Elma Thompson RRC the same year on 17 December at Holy Trinity Church in Sloane Street, London SW1. Cecily was the youngest daughter of the Reverend A. D. C. Thompson. St Maur Carter then remained in Germany until the following year in 1929, when he was posted back to the UK with Aldershot Command again to serve at the Cambridge Military Hospital.

Lt. Col. Herbert St Maur Carter, D.S.O., M.D. retired from the army in 1933 and settled in the village of Mortimer Common, near Reading in Berkshire, where he took a great interest in the people and village affairs. During the Second World War he served locally as a senior ARP medical officer with the Civil Defence.

He died at Mortimer on 10 February 1957 aged 78 years, with notice of his death and his obituary both being published in the British Medical Journal on 9 March 1957:

H. St Maur Carter was one of the generation of officers before the First World War, when the prestige of the R.A.M.C. reached its highest peak; an era associated with the names of Bruce, Leishman and many other officers who gained international fame ... He was the ideal army doctor, being a keen soldier, but a doctor first and last. Cultured and well informed, he possessed a kindly nature which endeared him to all his friends. With a keen sense of humour and a store of anecdotes and reminiscences derived from his service in various parts of the world, he was always the best company,
