= Charles Hemphill, 1st Baron Hemphill =

British politician

Charles Hemphill

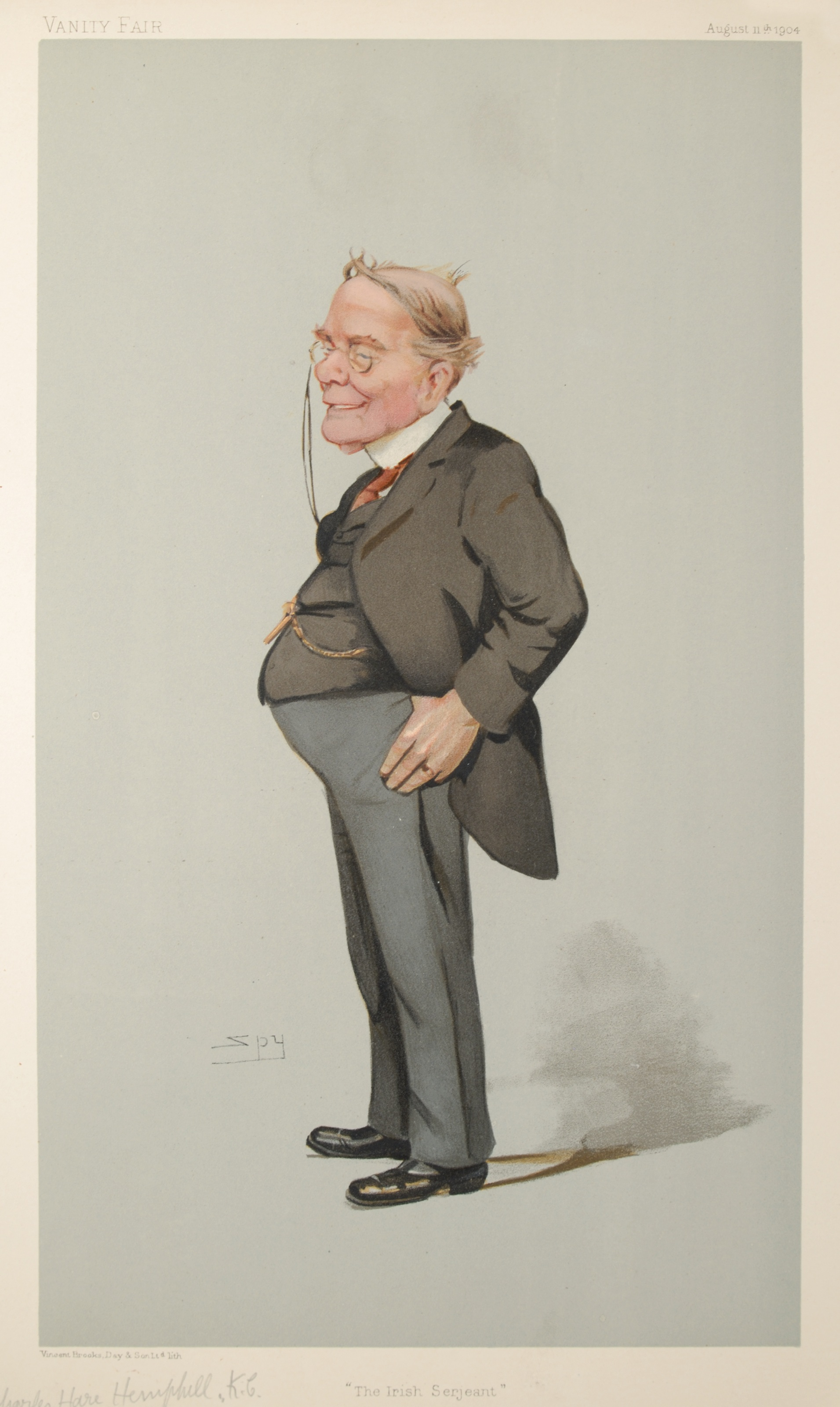
"The Irish Serjeant" Caricature of Charles Hare Hemphill by "Spy" (Leslie Ward) in Vanity Fair, August 1904

Charles Hare Hemphill, 1st Baron Hemphill, PC QC (August 1822 – 4 March 1908), was an Irish politician and barrister.

== Career ==
Hemphill was born in County Tyrone, Ireland. He was the son of John and the novelist Barbara Hemphill. He was made a Queen's Counsel (QC) shortly before being appointed Solicitor-General for Ireland in 1892, a post he held until 1895. He then sat as Member of Parliament for North Tyrone from 1895 to 1906, after which he was elevated to the peerage as Baron Hemphill, of Rathkenny and of Cashel in the County of Tipperary. While most Irish Law Officers could confidently look forward to promotion to the Bench, Hemphill's age apparently ruled him out of serious consideration.

As Solicitor-General, he is remembered mainly for the somewhat malicious "compliments" paid to him by the Lord Chief Justice of Ireland, Sir Peter O'Brien, in the celebrated 1894 case of R. (Bridgeman) v. Drury. Hemphill, who appeared for Dublin Corporation, had argued, apparently with a good deal of hyperbole, that the members of the corporation were entitled to charge the ratepayers of Dublin for an especially lavish picnic. The Lord Chief Justice paid ironic tribute to Hemphill's eloquence and persuasiveness, but added drily that he had entirely failed to persuade the Court that the members of the corporation would "starve" if they were unable to make the ratepayers foot the bill for fine claret, whiskey and cigars, to say nothing of the broken wineglasses (although there were only four of them, which as the judge fairly noted, seemed quite moderate in the circumstances).

== Family ==
Lord Hemphill married Augusta Mary, daughter of Major the Hon. Sir Francis Charles Stanhope (son of the 3rd Earl of Harrington), in 1849. They had three sons and one daughter. He died in March 1908 and was succeeded in the barony by his eldest son Stanhope Charles John Hemphill (m. the Hon May Hamilton (1879-1970), daughter of James, 9th Lord Belhaven and Stenton). He had no son and on his death, the title passed to his brother Fitzroy Hemphill, 3rd Baron Hemphill.

His daughter, Mary Hannah Augusta Hemphill, was the mother of the decorated R.A.M.C. officer and surgeon, Lt. Col. Herbert St Maur Carter, D.S.O., M.D.

Hemphill was a cousin of John Hemphill, a Chief Justice of the Texas Supreme Court, and a United States Senator, whose father was the Rev. John Hemphill from County Tyrone.

== Arms ==
Coat of arms of Charles Hemphill, 1st Baron Hemphill
Crest A boar passant Gules charged with a chevron and a portcullis Or. Escutcheon Or on a fess Gules between two chevronels and three stars Azure as many trefoils slipped of the field. Supporters On either side an Irish wolfhound gorged with a plain collar Or. Motto Constanter Ac Non Timide (Steadily and Fearlessly)

== Notes ==
Parliament of the United Kingdom
Preceded by Lord Frederick Spencer Hamilton	Member of Parliament for North Tyrone; 1895–1906	Succeeded by William Huston Dodd
Political offices
Preceded by Edward Carson	Solicitor General for Ireland; 1892–1895	Succeeded by William Kenny
Peerage of the United Kingdom
New creation	Baron Hemphill; 1906–1908	Succeeded by Stanhope Hemphill
