= Patrick Martyn-Hemphill, 5th Baron Hemphill =

Peter Patrick Fitzroy Martyn Hemphill, 5th Lord Hemphill (born Dublin 5 September 1928 – died 6 April 2012), the late 5th Baron Hemphill succeeded to the title on his father's death in 1957.

== Personal life ==
He was educated at Glenstal Abbey School during the Second World War and then at Downside School where his father had been educated. After Downside he attended Brasenose College, Oxford. He added the "Martyn" part to his surname after the death of his grandmother in 1958; she was the daughter of Andrew Martyn, of Spiddal, County Galway. Through the Martyns Hemphill inherited Tulira Castle, near Gort. This was originally a tower house but had considerable additions commissioned by Edward Martyn, founder of the Abbey Theatre. The castle and land were host to John Huston during his stay in Galway between 1960 and 1971 where they spent a considerable amount of time hunting with the Galway Blazers. Due to financial constraints Hemphill was forced to sell Tulira in 1982.

In 1952 he married Ann Rutlidge; they had three children, including Charles who inherited the title Baron Hemphill. Hemphill died in the Galway Clinic on 6 April 2012.

== Career ==
Hemphill's first became involved in horse racing when he became Master of the Galway Blazers on inheriting the title. He held the position from 1967 to 1960 and from 1972 to 1986. Hemphill was elected to the Irish National Hunt Society in 1965 and was Senior Steward between 1975 and 1980. He was elected to the Irish Turf Club in 1972 and served as Senior Steward from 1985 to 1988. In that position he was instrumental in modernising the Irish racing industry and amongst other things he found major corporate sponsors that put the industry on a more professional footing. The Lord Hemphill Memorial Handicap Steeplechase is named in his honour.

=== House of Lords ===
He took his seat in the House of Lords for the first time on 11 December 1957, and while he did occasionally sit there is no record of him making any contribution to debates. He remained a member of the House of Lords until the House of Lords Act 1999.

== Arms ==
Coat of arms of Patrick Martyn-Hemphill, 5th Baron Hemphill
Crest A boar passant Gules charged with a chevron and a portcullis Or. Escutcheon Or on a fess Gules between two chevronels and three stars Azure as many trefoils slipped of the field. Supporters On either side an Irish wolfhound gorged with a plain collar Or. Motto Constanter Ac Non Timide (Steadily and Fearlessly)

== External sources ==
Peerage of Ireland
Preceded by Martyn Charles Andrews Hemphill, 4th Baron Hemphill	Baron Hemphill; 1957–2012	Succeeded by Charles Andrew Martyn-Hemphill, 6th Baron Hemphill
