= Helen Hemphill =

American writer (born 1955)

- Born: July 1, 1955 (age 71)
- Education: Belmont University (MA)
- Occupation: Novelist
- Writing career
- Genres: Children's literature & young adult literature
- Notable works: Long Gone Daddy (2006); Runaround (2007); The Adventurous Deeds of Deadwood Jones (2008)

Helen Hemphill (born 1955) is an American children's and young adult novelist. Her three novels, published from 2006 to 2008, are all set in the southern USA, but feature diverse characters: a preacher's son, a tomboy 11-year-old girl and a 19th-century cowboy.

== Biography ==
Hemphill earned her MA in English Literature from Belmont University in Nashville, Tennessee, and worked for 20 years in advertising and public relations prior to her second career in teaching.

Hemphill has written three novels, all published by Front Street, an imprint of Boyds Mills Press. Her first book was Long Gone Daddy, published in 2006. Set in 1970s Texas, the novel is about a teenage boy and his relationship with his preacher father following the death of his grandfather. Publishers Weekly describes it as an "impressive debut", with "laugh-out-loud scenes, a marvelous narrative voice, period details and appealingly quirky characterization". Kirkus Reviews comments that the "wryly funny" work "relies a bit too much on hillbilly diction and unusual events", but concludes that Hemphill "is still a writer with promise". A review in the Journal of Adolescent & Adult Literacy said the book "deals with some tough issues, but does so in a way that will connect with students 13 and up". In 2007 it was featured in Books for the Teen Age published by the New York Public Library.

Her next book, Runaround, was published in 2007. About a tomboy 11-year-old girl seeking romance in 1960s Kentucky, the novel led Kirkus Reviews to describe Hemphill as "a strong new voice in children's literature". Publishers Weekly calls it an "often humorous coming-of-age novel" and praises the characterisation of the main character.

Her third book, The Adventurous Deeds of Deadwood Jones, was published in 2008. This historical fiction novel was inspired by the "dime novels" about "Deadwood Dick" written by Edward L. Wheeler and the autobiography of African American cowboy Nat Love. The main character is a young 19th-century cowboy loosely based on Love. Kirkus Reviews comments that the book's "adventures are nonstop", including "the excitement and danger of buffalo stampedes and river crossings".
