= John A. Hemphill =

United States Army general (1927–2021)

John Allen Hemphill
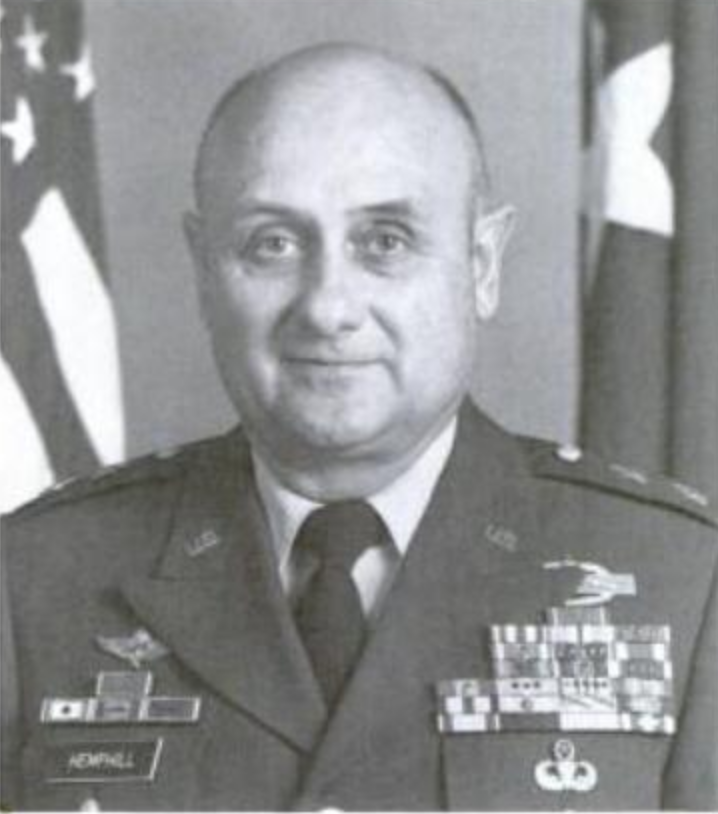
- Born: 19 December 1927; Boise, Idaho U.S.
- Died: May 21, 2021 (aged 93); Steilacoom, Washington
- Military career
- Allegiance: United States
- Branch: United States Army
- Service years: 1951–1985
- Rank: Major General
- Commands: Director of Operations, United States Readiness Command; 3rd Brigade, 9th Infantry Division; 2nd Battalion, 8th Cavalry Regiment; Company I, 3rd Battalion, 31st Infantry Regiment
- Conflicts: Korean War; Vietnam War
- Awards: Distinguished Service Cross; Defense Distinguished Service Medal; Army Distinguished Service Medal; Silver Star Medal (2); Defense Superior Service Medal; Legion of Merit (4); Distinguished Flying Cross (2); Bronze Star Medal (5); Purple Heart (3); Meritorious Service Medal; Air Medal (20)

John Allen Hemphill (December 19, 1927 - May 21, 2021) was a major general in the United States Army. He served as Director of Operations (J-3) of the United States Readiness Command. He was a 1951 graduate of the United States Military Academy with a B.S. degree in military science.

Hemphill was awarded the Distinguished Service Cross for his actions on 17 April 1953 near Chorwon, Korea. As commander of Company I, 3rd Battalion, 31st Infantry, 7th Infantry Division, he led a counterattack to regain an overrun hill position. Though wounded in both legs, Hemphill charged a machine gun bunker with a rocket launcher and fired his single projectile through the narrow opening from about twenty yards away, killing the occupants. Though later wounded another time, he refused to be evacuated until after the hill had been fully secured. Hemphill also received two Bronze Star Medals and two Purple Hearts for his service during the Korean War.

Hemphill graduated from the Infantry School Advanced Course in 1957, the Air Command and Staff College in 1961 and the Armed Forces Staff College in 1965. He later also graduated from the United States Army War College.

As a lieutenant colonel in 1966, Hemphill commanded the 2nd Battalion (Airborne), 8th Cavalry, 1st Cavalry Division (Airmobile) during his first tour in Vietnam. He was awarded another Bronze Star Medal and eleven Air Medals.

As a colonel from 1968 to 1969, Hemphill commanded the 3rd Brigade, 9th Infantry Division during his second tour in Vietnam. He was awarded two Silver Star Medals, two Distinguished Flying Crosses, two more Bronze Star Medals, a third Purple Heart and nine more Air Medals.

After his death, Hemphill was interred at the West Point Cemetery on August 23, 2021.
