= Hemphill Island =

Island in Antarctica

- Location within Antarctica

Geography
- Location: Antarctica
- Coordinates: 66°23′S 110°34′E
- Archipelago: Windmill Islands

Administration
- Administered under the Antarctic Treaty System

Demographics
- Population: Uninhabited

Hemphill Island is a small, mainly ice-covered Antarctic island lying between Robinson Ridge and Odbert Island, in the Windmill Islands. It was first mapped from air photos taken by USN Operation Highjump and Operation Windmill in 1947 and 1948. It was named by the US-ACAN for George R. Hemphill, meteorologist and member of the Wilkes Station party of 1961.

== See also ==
- Composite Antarctic Gazetteer
- List of Antarctic and sub-Antarctic islands
- List of Antarctic islands south of 60° S
- SCAR
- Territorial claims in Antarctica
