= Baron Hemphill =

Title in the Peerage of the United Kingdom

Charles Hemphill, 1st Baron Hemphill

Baron Hemphill, of Rathkenny and of Cashel in the County of Tipperary, is a title in the Peerage of the United Kingdom. It was created on 12 January 1906 for the lawyer and Liberal politician Charles Hemphill, Solicitor-General for Ireland between 1892 and 1895. His elder son, the second Baron, was Crown Prosecutor for County Wicklow. He was succeeded by his younger brother, the third Baron. He was Deputy Chairman of the London County Council from 1907 to 1908. The fifth Baron, who succeeded his father in 1957, assumed by deed poll in 1959 the additional surname of Martyn, which was the maiden name of his father's mother, a first cousin of Edward Martyn. As of 2017 the title is held by the latter's son, the sixth Baron, who succeeded his father in 2012.

The family seat is Raford House, near Kiltullagh, County Galway, in Ireland.

== Barons Hemphill (1906) ==
- Charles Hare Hemphill, 1st Baron Hemphill (1822–1908)
- Stanhope Charles John Hemphill, 2nd Baron Hemphill (1853–1919)
- Fitzroy Hemphill, 3rd Baron Hemphill (1860–1930)
- Martyn Charles Andrews Hemphill, 4th Baron Hemphill (1901–1957)
- Peter Patrick Martyn-Hemphill, 5th Baron Hemphill (1928–2012)
- Charles Andrew Martyn-Hemphill, 6th Baron Hemphill (b. 1954)

The heir apparent is the present holder's elder son, the Hon. Richard Patrick Lumley Martyn-Hemphill (b. 1990)

== Arms ==
Coat of arms of Baron Hemphill
Crest A boar passant Gules charged with a chevron and a portcullis Or. Escutcheon Or on a fess Gules between two chevronels and three stars Azure as many trefoils slipped of the field. Supporters On either side an Irish wolfhound gorged with a plain collar Or. Motto Constanter Ac Non Timide (Steadily and Fearlessly)
