= Barbara Hemphill =

- Born: Barbara Hare c. 1775; Golden, County Tipperary
- Died: 5 May 1858 (aged 82–83); Dublin
- Occupations: writer, novelist

Barbara Hemphill (c. 1775 - 5 May 1858) was an Irish writer of novels.

== Life ==
Hemphill was the youngest child of the absentee clergyman, Patrick Hare, who was nominally responsible for the settlement of Golden, County Tipperary. Her brother, Charles, was a fellow and tutor at Trinity College Dublin. Hemphill initially published her novels without identifying herself after being encouraged by the antiquary Thomas Crofton Croker.

She married John Hemphill, from Cashel, (died 1833) in 1807. They had five children, two sons and three daughters. The youngest of their children was the first Baron Hemphill. Her great granddaughter was Constance Wilde.

Hemphill's first published story was The Royal Confession, a Monastic Legend in the Dublin University Magazine (vol. 12, September 1838). Her 1846 novel Lionel Deerhurst, was edited by the Countess Marguerite Blessington. Hemphill is credited with three novels which she eventually published under her own name. Although it is suspected that there may be other unattributed works. A reviewer of The Priest's Niece, or, The Heirship of Barnulph in 1855 in Irish Quarterly Review described it as "full of incident, of invention, of bright flashes of genius, of descriptive power rarely excelled in those days" and that the author had "the true talent of the genuine novelist".

Hemphill died on 5 May 1858 in her son's home, 6 Lower Fitzwilliam Street in Dublin. Her death was not noted by contemporary newspapers or journals. She is commemorated on a mural tablet in St. John's Cathedral, Cashel.

== Works ==
- Lionel Deerhurst, or, Fashionable Life under the Regency, 1846
- The Priest's Niece, or, The Heirship of Barnulph, 1855
- Freida the Jongleur, 1857
