= Maida Withers =

American dancer, choreographer, and filmmaker

Maida Withers is an American dancer, choreographer, and filmmaker. Withers is the founder and artistic director of Maida Withers Dance Construction Company (1974) of Washington, D.C. She is a professor at the Corcoran School of the Arts and Design, at the George Washington University, Washington, D.C.

== Biography ==
Born October 13, 1936, in Kanab, Utah Withers began her exploration of dance at a young age taking classes in tap or ballet at the local dance class. Withers received her B.A in Dance and Theatre from Brigham Young University in 1958 and an M.S in Dance and Education in 1960 from the University of Utah.

== Career ==
In 1955 Withers participated in the experimental workshop on the dance deck of Anna Halprin, in Kentfield, California. She studied with Erick Hawkins, Merce Cunningham, Lucas Hoving, Jose Limon, Alwin Nikolais, and Mary Wigman, and at the Folkwangschule, Essen-Werden.

In the late 1960s and 70s Withers was part of the avant-garde and a voice in the revolution that created postmodernism in dance in America. Critic Lisa Traiger described "her own style of dance has been well regarded as innovative, bold and energetic, not afraid to conquer innovative movements or conjure up interesting notions in the audience."

Since 1968, Withers has created multimedia stage works featuring projected images and films and real-time interactive projects with cyber worlds, laser beams, virtual scenarios, and other electronic technologies. She has created works with rotating loudspeakers, laser beams, wireless cameras, and video installations - always with live music. Withers has initiated and directed several large-scale new media projects, collaborating with visual and performing artists, scientists, anthropologists, and others. Withers has toured internationally engaging in various projects in such diverse places as Guatemala, France, The Netherlands, Japan, China, Hong Kong, Korea, Brazil, Finland, Venezuela, Mexico, Poland, Germany, among others. Her current focus is on technology and its interface with human emotional expression related to popular global culture.

Her works reveal an ongoing interest in social and political issues and in juxtaposing dance and technology.

Withers has been on the faculties of Purdue and Howard Universities and taught nationally as a specialist with NEA Artists-in-Schools Program and internationally for various festivals and conferences. Withers directed the MFA program in choreography and performance at The George Washington University for over twenty years.

Withers was Founding Director of the Washington, DC International Improvisation Plus+ Festival featuring local, national, and international dance, music, theatre, and performance art.

== Maida Withers Dance Construction Company ==
In 1974 Withers founded the Maida Withers Dance Construction Company as she began generating new approaches to training and choreography. This not-for-profit arts organization was created to produce original dance works for stage, sites and video in a collaborative process with visual and performing artists. The company frequently collaborates with musicians, designers, and interdisciplinary artists.

The Dance Construction Company have toured throughout the US, and internationally to Brazil, Mexico, Germany, Korea, Japan, China, Malaysia, Hong Kong, The Netherlands, France, Venezuela, Poland, Russia, and other locations.

== Awards and Recognitions ==
1980 Maida Withers, Special Thanks for your Assistance and Support, The Performing Arts Company, TAHL, Malaysia

1981 Metropolitan Dance Association, "1981 dance Award - To Maida Withers for Continued Commitment and Outstanding Contribution to Dance in the Washington Area", Washington, D.C.

1983 Kansai University, Osaka, Japan, Faculty Exchange

1999 George Washington University Service Award

1999 George Washington University, Columbian Professorship Award

2001 Pola Nirenska Award for Exceptional Creative Contribution, Washington Performing Arts Society, Washington D.C.

2003 Virginia Commission for the Arts and Humanities, Choreographer's Fellowship

2006 The Mayor's Arts Award, District of Columbia. "Excellence in Artistic Discipline", DC Commission of the Arts and Humanities, Washington, D.C.

2006 Metro DC Dance Awards "Outstanding Overall Production - Large Venue", Washington, D.C.

2007 Dance Place "Lifetime Educator's Achievement Award", Washington, D.C.

2008 Cultural Envoy, US Department of State, US Embassy, GoDown Center, Nairobi, Kenya

2009 Key to the city, Mayor's Award for Distinctive Contribution, Kanab, Utah

2010 Dance in the Desert Festival, CSN Dance Program Daffy Award, In Recognition of a Lifetime Spent in the Service of Dance as an Artform, Las Vegas, Nevada

2014 The Mayor's Arts Award, District of Columbia, Special Recognition, DC Commission on the Arts and Humanities, Washington, D.C.

== Works ==
Withers has created over 150 works with her company.

Laser Dance 1 (1971)

Laser Sculptor: Rockne Krebs

Collaborators: Brook Andrews, Lynda Gattozzi, Michael Kilgore

Families are Forever (1981)

Music: Joe Clark, Mike Lovett

Visual Artist: Janet Saad Cook

Lighting: Ed Houser

Dance for the Earth (1992)

Music: Shaman

Costumes: Hilda Thorpe

Lighting: William (Bill) Demull

Thresholds Crossed (2006)

Music: Audrey Chen, Steve Hilmy

Lighting: William (Bill) Demull

Costumes: Anthony Gongora, Maida Withers

Video Installation: Linda Lewett

Tzveta II (2011)

Editor: Ayodamola (Ayo) Okunseinde

Music Steve Hilmy

Producer: Maida Withers

Collision Course: a.k.a. Pillow Talk (2012)

Music: Steve Hilmy

Visual Design: Anthony Gongora

Costumes: Sigríd Jóhannesdóttir

Lighting: Michael Sperber

MindFluctuations (2015)

Computer Artist: Tania Fraga

Music: John Driscoll, Steve Hilmy

Sculptor: David Page

Costumes: Maida Withers

ICEBERGS: Glacial Drift (2016)

Music: John Driscoll, Steve Hilmy

Poet: David McAleavey

Costumes: Kelvin Small. Karen Cerkez

Architects: James Corner Field Operations

Rainforest Awaken (2020)

Computer Artist: Tania Fraga

Music: Steve Hilmy
