= George Hemphill =

American art dealer

- Website: hemphillfinearts.com

George Hemphill is an American art dealer. He is a member of the board of directors of the Association of International Photography Art Dealers. He was curator of photography for the Middendorf Gallery in Washington, D.C. He has edited and published several publications on art and photography, including Man Ray's Paris Portraits: 1921-39, William Christenberry: W/P, and Joseph Mills: Inner City.

== Works ==
=== Bibliography ===
- Hemphill, George, Ben Davis, Sarah Schroth (1977), BEO, Atlanta, Nexus Press-Book of mail art
